= Swimming at the 2004 Summer Paralympics – Women's 4 × 100 metre medley relay 34pts =

Women's 4x100m Medley 34 pts at the XII Paralympic Games
- Paralympic Swimming
- Venue: Olympic Aquatic Centre
- Dates: 27 September 2004
- Competitors: 8
- Winning time: 5:14.08

Medalists
1st place, gold medalist(s)		Mikhaila Rutherford; Beth Riggle; Kelly Crowley; Erin Popovich	United States
2nd place, silver medalist(s)		Darda Geiger; Elisabeth Walker; Anne Cecile Polinario; Stephanie Dixon	Canada
3rd place, bronze medalist(s)		Chantel Wolfenden; Katerina Bailey; Brooke Stockham; Hannah MacDougall	Australia

The Women's 4 x 100 metre medley relay 34pts swimming event at the 2004 Summer Paralympics was competed on 27 September. It was won by the team representing United States.

== Final round ==
27 Sept. 2004, evening session

Rank	Team	Time	Notes
1st place, gold medalist(s)	United States	5:14.08	
2nd place, silver medalist(s)	Canada	5:18.57	
3rd place, bronze medalist(s)	Australia	5:25.02	
4	Russia	5:25.14	
5	China	5:36.40	
6	Germany	5:45.26	
	Great Britain	DNS	
	Poland	DSQ	

== Team lists ==
United States; Mikhaila Rutherford; Beth Riggle; Kelly Crowley; Erin Popovich	Canada; Darda Geiger; Elisabeth Walker; Anne Polinario; Stephanie Dixon	Australia; Chantel Wolfenden; Katerina Bailey; Brooke Stockham; Hannah MacDougall	Russia; Tatiana Outekina; Yulia Nikitina; Irina Grazhdanova; Oxana Guseva
China; Wang Shuai; Lu Weiyuan; Qian Hui Yu; Jiang Fuying	Germany; Claudia Knoth; Kirsten Bruhn; Claudia Hengst; Christiane Reppe	Great Britain; Sarah Bailey MBE; Claire Cashmore; Lara Ferguson; Nyree Lewis	Poland; Beata Drozdowska; Magdalena Jaroslawska; Magdalena Szczepinska; Aneta Michalska
