= Swimming at the 2004 Summer Paralympics – Women's 100 metre breaststroke SB8 =

Women's 100m Breaststroke SB8 at the XII Paralympic Games
- Paralympic Swimming
- Venue: Olympic Aquatic Centre
- Dates: 21 September 2004
- Competitors: 11 from 8 nations
- Winning time: 1:23.85

Medalists
| 1st place, gold medalist(s) | | Sisse Grynet Egeborg | Denmark |
| 2nd place, silver medalist(s) | | Mikhaila Rutherford | United States |
| 3rd place, bronze medalist(s) | | Beth Riggle | United States |

The Women's 100 metre breaststroke SB8 swimming event at the 2004 Summer Paralympics was competed on 21 September. It was won by Sisse Grynet Egeborg, representing Denmark.

== 1st round ==
| Qualified for final round |

Heat 1

21 Sept. 2004, morning session

| Rank | Athlete | Time | Notes |
|---|---|---|---|
| 1 | Mikhaila Rutherford (USA) | 1:28.03 | |
| 2 | Leila Marques (POR) | 1:32.25 | |
| 3 | Jiang Sheng Nan (CHN) | 1:32.55 | |
| 4 | Fu Ting (CHN) | 1:36.46 | |
| | Ana Sršen (CRO) | DSQ | |

Heat 2

21 Sept. 2004, morning session

| Rank | Athlete | Time | Notes |
|---|---|---|---|
| 1 | Sisse Grynet Egeborg (DEN) | 1:27.06 | |
| 2 | Beth Riggle (USA) | 1:30.93 | |
| 3 | Natalie du Toit (RSA) | 1:30.95 | |
| 4 | Brooke Stockham (AUS) | 1:34.41 | |
| 5 | Immacolata Cerasuolo (ITA) | 1:36.40 | |
| | Zhao Chunhua (CHN) | DSQ | |

== Final round ==
21 Sept. 2004, evening session

| Rank | Athlete | Time | Notes |
|---|---|---|---|
| 1st place, gold medalist(s) | Sisse Grynet Egeborg (DEN) | 1:23.85 | PR |
| 2nd place, silver medalist(s) | Mikhaila Rutherford (USA) | 1:27.68 | |
| 3rd place, bronze medalist(s) | Beth Riggle (USA) | 1:29.66 | |
| 4 | Natalie du Toit (RSA) | 1:30.17 | |
| 5 | Leila Marques (POR) | 1:30.63 | |
| 6 | Jiang Sheng Nan (CHN) | 1:34.29 | |
| 7 | Brooke Stockham (AUS) | 1:34.96 | |
| 8 | Immacolata Cerasuolo (ITA) | 1:34.97 | |
