= Swimming at the 2004 Summer Paralympics – Women's 200 metre individual medley SM9 =

Women's 200m Individual Medley SM9 at the XII Paralympic Games
- Paralympic Swimming
- Venue: Olympic Aquatic Centre
- Dates: 23 September 2004
- Competitors: 16 from 12 nations
- Winning time: 2:29.98

Medalists
1st place, gold medalist(s)		Natalie du Toit	South Africa
2nd place, silver medalist(s)		Stephanie Dixon	Canada
3rd place, bronze medalist(s)		Claire Cashmore	Great Britain

The Women's 200 metre individual medley SM9 swimming event at the 2004 Summer Paralympics was competed on 23 September. It was won by Natalie du Toit, representing South Africa.

== 1st round ==
Qualified for final round

Heat 1

23 Sept. 2004, morning session

Rank	Athlete	Time	Notes
1	Stephanie Dixon (CAN)	2:47.78	
2	Emilie Gral (FRA)	2:48.74	
3	Sisse Grynet Egeborg (DEN)	2:51.04	
4	Claire Cashmore (GBR)	2:51.74	
5	Irina Grazhdanova (RUS)	2:56.00	
6	Christiane Reppe (GER)	3:03.39	
7	Tereza Diepoldova (CZE)	3:04.77	
8	Zhao Chunhua (CHN)	3:07.05	

Heat 2

23 Sept. 2004, morning session

Rank	Athlete	Time	Notes
1	Natalie du Toit (RSA)	2:32.19	WR
2	Kelly Crowley (USA)	2:53.22	
3	Leila Marques (POR)	2:54.59	
4	Katerina Bailey (AUS)	2:55.26	
5	Katerina Coufalova (CZE)	2:57.80	
6	Tatiana Outekina (RUS)	2:59.17	
7	Kathrine Gronkjaer (DEN)	2:59.52	
8	Lara Ferguson (GBR)	3:12.64	

== Final round ==
23 Sept. 2004, evening session

Rank	Athlete	Time	Notes
1st place, gold medalist(s)	Natalie du Toit (RSA)	2:29.98	WR
2nd place, silver medalist(s)	Stephanie Dixon (CAN)	2:41.84	
3rd place, bronze medalist(s)	Claire Cashmore (GBR)	2:48.07	
4	Emilie Gral (FRA)	2:48.96	
5	Kelly Crowley (USA)	2:49.47	
6	Katerina Bailey (AUS)	2:52.28	
7	Sisse Grynet Egeborg (DEN)	2:53.01	
8	Leila Marques (POR)	2:55.30	
