= Swimming at the 2004 Summer Paralympics =

Swimming at the XII Paralympic Games
- Paralympic Swimming
- Venue: Indoor Pool of the Athens Olympic Aquatic Centre
- Dates: 19–27 September 2004
- Competitors: 166 from 61 nations

Swimming at the 2004 Summer Paralympics, in the Olympic Aquatic Centre was competed in freestyle, backstroke and butterfly (classes Sn), the breaststroke (classes SBn) and individual medley (classes SMn).

- Swimmers with a physical disability were assessed on muscle strength and the scope and coordination of movement, and their impact on different swimming styles. The resultant classes were (lower numbers corresponding to more severe disability):
  - S1-S10 for freestyle, backstroke, and butterfly
  - SB2-SB9 for breaststroke
  - SM3-SM10 for the individual medley
- Swimmers with vision impairment, depending on the degree of vision loss, were classified as S11 (worst vision loss), S12, or S13 (least)

== Participating countries ==
- Argentina (10)
- Australia (30)
- Austria (2)
- Belarus (7)
- Belgium (3)
- Bosnia and Herzegovina (1)
- Brazil (21)
- Canada (19)
- China (51)
- Chinese Taipei (1)
- Croatia (3)
- Cuba (1)
- Cyprus (3)
- Czech Republic (16)
- Denmark (8)
- Estonia (3)
- Faroe Islands (1)
- Fiji (1)
- Finland (4)
- France (11)
- Germany (18)
- Great Britain (34)
- Greece (12)
- Hungary (8)
- Iceland (1)
- Indonesia (1)
- Ireland (3)
- Israel (8)
- Italy (7)
- Kazakhstan (1)
- Lithuania (1)
- Malaysia (3)
- Mexico (1)
- Netherlands (7)
- New Zealand (5)
- Norway (6)
- Panama (1)
- Peru (2)
- Poland (24)
- Russia (15)
- Serbia and Montenegro (1)
- Singapore (1)
- Slovakia (4)
- Slovenia (1)
- South Africa (9)
- South Korea (4)
- Spain (47)
- Sri Lanka (1)
- Sweden (3)
- Switzerland (5)
- Thailand (12)
- Turkey (2)
- Ukraine (21)
- United States (45)
- Venezuela (3)
- Vietnam (1)

== Medal table ==
Rank	Nation	Gold	Silver	Bronze	Total
1	China (CHN)	19	16	6	41
2	Great Britain (GBR)	16	20	16	52
3	United States (USA)	16	4	15	35
4	Canada (CAN)	15	14	11	40
5	Spain (ESP)	13	12	15	40
6	Ukraine (UKR)	12	8	8	28
7	Japan (JPN)	8	6	9	23
8	Mexico (MEX)	7	3	4	14
9	Brazil (BRA)	7	3	1	11
10	Australia (AUS)	6	14	15	35
11	Russia (RUS)	6	4	4	14
12	South Africa (RSA)	6	4	1	11
13	Germany (GER)	5	8	10	23
14	Belarus (BLR)	5	5	3	13
15	Czech Republic (CZE)	5	0	1	6
16	France (FRA)	4	7	10	21
17	Greece (GRE)	3	8	2	13
18	Poland (POL)	3	7	6	16
19	Israel (ISR)	3	4	3	10
20	Sweden (SWE)	2	0	2	4
21	Hungary (HUN)	1	5	3	9
22	Denmark (DEN)	1	2	2	5
23	Italy (ITA)	1	1	1	3
24	Iceland (ISL)	1	1	0	2
25	Norway (NOR)	1	0	1	2
26	Cyprus (CYP)	1	0	0	1
27	Netherlands (NED)	0	2	5	7
28	Thailand (THA)	0	2	2	4
29	Argentina (ARG)	0	1	1	2
30	Estonia (EST)	0	1	0	1
30	Ireland (IRL)	0	1	0	1
30	Lithuania (LTU)	0	1	0	1
30	Slovakia (SVK)	0	1	0	1
34	Croatia (CRO)	0	0	3	3
34	Portugal (POR)	0	0	3	3
36	Peru (PER)	0	0	2	2
37	Faroe Islands (FRO)	0	0	1	1
37	New Zealand (NZL)	0	0	1	1
Totals (38 entries)		167	165	167	499

== Medal summary ==
=== Men's events ===
Event	Gold	Silver	Bronze
50 m freestyle S1	Izhak Mamistvalov; Israel	Christos Tampaxis; Greece	João Martins; Portugal
50 m freestyle S2	Jim Anderson; Great Britain	Philippe Revillon; France	Curtis Lovejoy; United States
50 m freestyle S3	Martin Kovar; Czech Republic	Jian Ping Du; China	Jimmy Eulert; Peru
50 m freestyle S4	Clodoaldo Silva; Brazil	Yuji Hanada; Japan	David Smetanine; France
50 m freestyle S5	Sebastián Rodríguez; Spain	Dmytro Kryzhanovskyy; Ukraine	Anthony Stephens; Great Britain
50 m freestyle S6	Jianhua Yin; China	Daniel Vidal; Spain	Anders Olsson; Sweden
50 m freestyle S7	David Roberts; Great Britain	Matt Walker; Great Britain	Lantz Lamback; United States
50 m freestyle S8	Xiao Fu Wang; China	Konstantinos Fykas; Greece	Ben Austin; Australia
50 m freestyle S9	Xiao Ming Xiong; China	Renjie Wang; China	Matthew Cowdrey; Australia
50 m freestyle S10	Benoît Huot; Canada	David Levecq; Spain	Justin Zook; United States
50 m freestyle S11	Junichi Kawai; Japan	Grzegorz Polkowski; Poland	Viktor Smyrnov; Ukraine
50 m freestyle S12	Dmytro Aleksyeyev; Ukraine	Raman Makarau; Belarus	Bin Wu; China
50 m freestyle S13	Andrey Strokin; Russia	Charalampos Taiganidis; Greece	Scott Field; South Africa
100 m freestyle S1	Izhak Mamistvalov; Israel	Christos Tampaxis; Greece	Jiri Kaderavek; Czech Republic
100 m freestyle S2	Jim Anderson; Great Britain	Curtis Lovejoy; United States	Philippe Revillon; France
100 m freestyle S3	Martin Kovar; Czech Republic	Jian Ping Du; China	Ioannis Kostakis; Greece
100 m freestyle S4	Clodoaldo Silva; Brazil	Yuji Hanada; Japan	Richard Oribe; Spain
100 m freestyle S5	Sebastián Rodríguez; Spain	Dmytro Kryzhanovskyy; Ukraine	Anthony Stephens; Great Britain
100 m freestyle S6	Jianhua Yin; China	Yuan Tang; China	Anders Olsson; Sweden
100 m freestyle S7	David Roberts; Great Britain	Matt Walker; Great Britain	Lantz Lamback; United States
100 m freestyle S8	Ben Austin; Australia	Konstantinos Fykas; Greece	Ricardo Moffatti; Australia
100 m freestyle S9	Matthew Cowdrey; Australia	Xiao Ming Xiong; China	Michael Prout; United States
100 m freestyle S10	Benoît Huot; Canada	David Levecq; Spain	Mike van der Zanden; Netherlands
100 m freestyle S11	Viktor Smyrnov; Ukraine	Junichi Kawai; Japan	Donovan Tildesley; Canada
100 m freestyle S12	Raman Makarau; Belarus	Dmytro Aleksyeyev; Ukraine	Sergei Punko; Belarus
100 m freestyle S13	Andrey Strokin; Russia	Scott Field; South Africa	Daniel Clausner; Germany
200 m freestyle S2	Jim Anderson; Great Britain	Izhak Mamistvalov; Israel	Philippe Revillon; France
200 m freestyle S3	Martin Kovar; Czech Republic	Jian Ping Du; China	Carlo Piccoli; Italy
200 m freestyle S4	Clodoaldo Silva; Brazil	Richard Oribe; Spain	Yuji Hanada; Japan
200 m freestyle S5	Sebastián Rodríguez; Spain	Anthony Stephens; Great Britain	Ryszard Beczek; Poland
400 m freestyle S6	Anders Olsson; Sweden	Yuan Tang; China	Peter Andersen; Denmark
400 m freestyle S7	David Roberts; Great Britain	Rong Tian; China	Nimrod Zviran; Israel
400 m freestyle S8	Christoph Burkard; Germany	Christopher Kueken; Germany	Mihovil Spanja; Croatia
400 m freestyle S9	Michael Prout; United States	James Crisp; Great Britain	Matthew Cowdrey; Australia
400 m freestyle S10	Benoît Huot; Canada	Robert Welbourn; Great Britain	Piotr Pijanowski; Poland
400 m freestyle S11	Viktor Smyrnov; Ukraine	Donovan Tildesley; Canada	Enhamed Mohamed; Spain
400 m freestyle S12	Sergei Punko; Belarus	Enrique Floriano; Spain	Raman Makarau; Belarus
400 m freestyle S13	Walter Wu; Canada	Scott Field; South Africa	Brian Hill; Canada
50 m butterfly S4	Clodoaldo Silva; Brazil	Somchai Doungkaew; Thailand	Jose Arnulfo Castorena; Mexico
50 m butterfly S5	Junquan He; China	Ervin Kovacs; Hungary	Pascal Pinard; France
50 m butterfly S6	Peng Li; China	Igor Plotnikov; Russia	Daniel Vidal; Spain
50 m butterfly S7	Rong Tian; China	Mang Pei; China	Yuriy Andryushin; Ukraine
100 m butterfly S8	Xiao Fu Wang; China	Ben Austin; Australia	Giles Long; Great Britain
100 m butterfly S9	Jesus Collado; Spain	Matthew Cowdrey; Australia	Sam Bramham; Australia
100 m butterfly S10	Benoît Huot; Canada	Daniel Bell; Australia	Jody Cundy; Great Britain
100 m butterfly S11	Viktor Smyrnov; Ukraine	Junichi Kawai; Japan	Enhamed Mohamed; Spain
100 m butterfly S12	Raman Makarau; Belarus	Sergei Punko; Belarus	Israel Oliver; Spain
100 m butterfly S13	Charalampos Taiganidis; Greece	Scott Field; South Africa	Andrey Strokin; Russia
50 m breaststroke SB2	Jose Arnulfo Castorena; Mexico	Somchai Doungkaew; Thailand	Michael Demarco; United States
50 m breaststroke SB3	Miguel Luque; Spain	Vicente Gil; Spain	Hiroshi Karube; Japan
100 m breaststroke SB4	Pascal Pinard; France	Ivanildo Vasconcelos; Brazil	Francisco Avelino; Brazil
100 m breaststroke SB5	Tadhg Slattery; South Africa	Kasper Engel; Netherlands	Pedro Rangel; Mexico
100 m breaststroke SB6	Gareth Duke; Great Britain	Travis Mohr; United States	Eric Lindmann; France
100 m breaststroke SB7	Sascha Kindred; Great Britain	Baoren Gong; China	Peng Li; China; Tomotaro Nakamura; Japan
100 m breaststroke SB8	Andriy Kalyna; Ukraine	James Crisp; Great Britain	Ke Qiang Li; China
100 m breaststroke SB9	Dmitri Poline; Russia	Daniel Bell; Australia	Denis Dorogaev; Russia
100 m breaststroke SB11	Oleksandr Mashchenko; Ukraine	Viktor Smyrnov; Ukraine	Panom Lagsanaprim; Thailand
100 m breaststroke SB12	Dmytro Aleksyeyev; Ukraine	Sergei Punko; Belarus	Dmytro Kuzmin; Ukraine
100 m breaststroke SB13	Andrey Strokin; Russia; Daniel Clausner; Germany		Daniel Sharp; New Zealand
50 m backstroke S1	Christos Tampaxis; Greece	Alexandros Taxildaris; Greece	João Martins; Portugal
50 m backstroke S2	Jim Anderson; Great Britain	Miroslaw Piesak; Poland	Georgios Kapellakis; Greece
50 m backstroke S3	Jian Ping Du; China	Albert Bakaev; Russia	Jimmy Eulert; Peru
50 m backstroke S4	Juan Ignacio Reyes; Mexico	Kestutis Skucas; Lithuania	Hua Bin Zeng; China
50 m backstroke S5	Junquan He; China	Ervin Kovacs; Hungary	Zsolt Vereczkei; Hungary
100 m backstroke S6	Igor Plotnikov; Russia	Yuan Tang; China	Mateusz Michalski; Poland
100 m backstroke S7	Andrew Lindsay; Great Britain	Guillermo Marro; Argentina	Eric Lindmann; France
100 m backstroke S8	Travis Mohr; United States	David Malone; Ireland	Mihovil Spanja; Croatia
100 m backstroke S9	Jarrett Perry; United States	James Crisp; Great Britain	Jesus Collado; Spain
100 m backstroke S10	Justin Zook; United States	Benoît Huot; Canada	Rod Welsh; Australia
100 m backstroke S11	Viktor Smyrnov; Ukraine	Javier Goni; Spain	Junichi Kawai; Japan
100 m backstroke S12	Raman Makarau; Belarus	Sergiy Klippert; Ukraine	Yoshikazu Sakai; Japan
100 m backstroke S13	Charalampos Taiganidis; Greece	Walter Wu; Canada	Brian Hill; Canada
150 m individual medley SM3	Jian Ping Du; China	Jose Arnulfo Castorena; Mexico	Juan Ignacio Reyes; Mexico
150 m individual medley SM4	Clodoaldo Silva; Brazil	Xavier Torres; Spain	Sanit Songnork; Thailand
200 m individual medley SM5	Junquan He; China	Ervin Kovacs; Hungary	Pascal Pinard; France
200 m individual medley SM6	Sascha Kindred; Great Britain	Yuan Run Yang; China	Swen Michaelis; Germany
200 m individual medley SM7	Rudy Garcia-Tolson; United States	David Roberts; Great Britain	Eric Lindmann; France
200 m individual medley SM8	Xiao Fu Wang; China	Ben Austin; Australia	Mihovil Spanja; Croatia
200 m individual medley SM9	Matthew Cowdrey; Australia	Andriy Kalyna; Ukraine	James Crisp; Great Britain
200 m individual medley SM10	Benoît Huot; Canada	Rod Welsh; Australia	Piotr Pijanowski; Poland
200 m individual medley SM11	Viktor Smyrnov; Ukraine	Donovan Tildesley; Canada	Oleksandr Mashchenko; Ukraine
200 m individual medley SM12	Sergei Punko; Belarus	Raman Makarau; Belarus	Enrique Floriano; Spain
200 m individual medley SM13	Daniel Clausner; Germany	Walter Wu; Canada	Dervis Konuralp; Great Britain
4 × 50 m freestyle relay 20 pts	China (CHN); Jian Ping Du; Yuan Tang; Junquan He; Jianhua Yin	Brazil (BRA); Clodoaldo Silva; Joon Sok Seo; Luis Silva; Adriano Lima	Great Britain (GBR); Kenny Cairns; Gareth Duke; Anthony Stephens; Sascha Kindred
4 × 100 m freestyle relay 34 pts	Great Britain (GBR); Matt Walker; Graham Edmunds; David Roberts; Robert Welbourn	Australia (AUS); Rod Welsh; Alex Harris; Ben Austin; Matthew Cowdrey	China (CHN); Renjie Wang; Xiao Fu Wang; Jianhua Yin; Xiao Ming Xiong
4 × 100 m freestyle relay 49 pts	Ukraine (UKR); Dmytro Kuzmin; Sergiy Demchuk; Sergiy Klippert; Dmytro Aleksyeyev	Belarus (BLR); Yury Rudzenok; Raman Makarau; Dmitri Kravtsevich; Sergei Punko	Japan (JPN); Junichi Kawai; Shusaku Sugiuchi; Kosei Egawa; Yoshikazu Sakai
4 × 50 m medley relay 20 pts	Brazil (BRA); Francisco Avelino; Adriano Lima; Luis Silva; Clodoaldo Silva	Japan (JPN); Daisuke Ejima; Takayuki Suzuki; Daisuke Maeda; Yuji Hanada	Spain (ESP); Xavier Torres; Pablo Cimadevilla; Daniel Vidal; Sebastián Rodríguez
4 × 100 m medley relay 34 pts	Australia (AUS); Rick Pendleton; Matthew Cowdrey; Alex Hadley; Sam Bramham	China (CHN); Renjie Wang; Ke Qiang Li; Xiao Fu Wang; Xiao Ming Xiong	Poland (POL); Mateusz Michalski; Krzysztof Paterka; Kamil Dragowski; Piotr Pijanowski
4 × 100 m medley relay 49 pts	Ukraine (UKR); Sergiy Klippert; Oleksandr Mashchenko; Sergiy Demchuk; Dmytro Aleksyeyev	Spain (ESP); Albert Gelis; Daniel Llambrich; Israel Oliver; Enrique Floriano	Belarus (BLR); Raman Makarau; Yury Rudzenok; Sergei Punko; Dmitri Kravtsevich

=== Women's events ===
Event	Gold	Silver	Bronze
50 m freestyle S2	Sara Carracelas; Spain	Maria Kalpakidou; Greece	Danielle Watts; Great Britain
50 m freestyle S3	Patricia Valle; Mexico	Fran Williamson; Great Britain	Annke Conradi; Germany
50 m freestyle S4	Mayumi Narita; Japan	Melanie Benn; United States	Karen Breumsoe; Denmark
50 m freestyle S5	Olena Akopyan; Ukraine	Béatrice Hess; France	Teresa Perales; Spain
50 m freestyle S6	Doramitzi Gonzalez; Mexico	Ludivine Loiseau; France	Erika Nara; Japan
50 m freestyle S7	Erin Popovich; United States	Kirsten Bruhn; Germany	Danielle Campo; Canada
50 m freestyle S8	Cecilie Drabsch; Norway	Keren Or Leybovitch; Israel	Pernille Thomsen; Netherlands
50 m freestyle S9	Natalie du Toit; South Africa	Irina Grazhdanova; Russia	Stephanie Dixon; Canada
50 m freestyle S10	Anne Polinario; Canada	Viera Mikulasikova; Slovakia	Esther Morales; Spain
50 m freestyle S11	Fabiana Sugimori; Brazil	Natalie Ball; Germany	Marion Nijhof; Netherlands
50 m freestyle S12	Hong Yan Zhu; China	Marge Kõrkjas; Estonia	Yuliya Volkova; Ukraine
50 m freestyle S13	Kirby Cote; Canada	Prue Watt; Australia	Chelsey Gotell; Canada
100 m freestyle S2	Sara Carracelas; Spain	Danielle Watts; Great Britain	Betiana Basualdo; Argentina
100 m freestyle S3	Patricia Valle; Mexico	Annke Conradi; Germany	Fran Williamson; Great Britain
100 m freestyle S4	Mayumi Narita; Japan	Karen Breumsoe; Denmark	Melanie Benn; United States
100 m freestyle S5	Teresa Perales; Spain	Béatrice Hess; France	Olena Akopyan; Ukraine
100 m freestyle S6	Doramitzi Gonzalez; Mexico	Ludivine Loiseau; France	Erika Nara; Japan
100 m freestyle S7	Erin Popovich; United States	Chantel Wolfenden; Australia	Kirsten Bruhn; Germany
100 m freestyle S8	Jessica Long; United States	Keren Or Leybovitch; Israel	Cecilie Drabsch; Norway
100 m freestyle S9	Natalie du Toit; South Africa	Stephanie Dixon; Canada	Christiane Reppe; Germany
100 m freestyle S10	Anne Polinario; Canada	Katarzyna Pawlik; Poland	Sarah Bailey; Great Britain
100 m freestyle S11	Anais Garcia; Spain	Natalie Ball; Germany	Marion Nijhof; Netherlands
100 m freestyle S12	Hong Yan Zhu; China	Patrycja Harajda; Poland	Joanna Mendak; Poland
100 m freestyle S13	Kirby Cote; Canada	Prue Watt; Australia	Chelsey Gotell; Canada
200 m freestyle S4	Mayumi Narita; Japan	Karen Breumsoe; Denmark	Cheryl Angelelli; United States
200 m freestyle S5	Béatrice Hess; France	Olena Akopyan; Ukraine	Inbal Pezaro; Israel
400 m freestyle S6	Doramitzi Gonzalez; Mexico	Mhairi Love; Great Britain	Nyree Lewis; Great Britain
400 m freestyle S7	Chantel Wolfenden; Australia	Oxana Guseva; Russia	Danielle Campo; Canada
400 m freestyle S8	Jessica Long; United States	Lichelle Clarke; Australia	Heidi Andreasen; Faroe Islands
400 m freestyle S9	Natalie du Toit; South Africa	Stephanie Dixon; Canada	Christiane Reppe; Germany
400 m freestyle S10	Katarzyna Pawlik; Poland	Claudia Hengst; Germany	Ashley Owens; United States
400 m freestyle S12	Ana Garcia-Arcicollar; Spain	Deborah Font; Spain	Yuliya Volkova; Ukraine
400 m freestyle S13	Kirby Cote; Canada	Prue Watt; Australia	Rhiannon Henry; Great Britain
50 m butterfly S4	Sandra Erikson; Sweden	Patricia Valle; Mexico	Anne Cecile Lequien; France
50 m butterfly S5	Teresa Perales; Spain	Olena Akopyan; Ukraine	Katalin Engelhardt; Hungary
50 m butterfly S6	Ludivine Loiseau; France	Doramitzi Gonzalez; Mexico	Sarah Rose; Australia
50 m butterfly S7	Erin Popovich; United States	Min Huang; China	Elisabeth Walker; Canada
100 m butterfly S8	Immacolata Cerasuolo; Italy	Dóra Pásztory; Hungary	Andrea Cole; Canada
100 m butterfly S9	Natalie du Toit; South Africa	Stephanie Dixon; Canada	Kate Bailey; Australia
100 m butterfly S10	Magdalena Szczepinska; Poland	Katarzyna Pawlik; Poland	Claudia Hengst; Germany
100 m butterfly S12	Joanna Mendak; Poland	Hong Yan Zhu; China	Ana Garcia-Arcicollar; Spain
100 m butterfly S13	Kirby Cote; Canada	Prue Watt; Australia	Rhiannon Henry; Great Britain
50 m breaststroke SB3	Mayumi Narita; Japan	Maggie McEleny; Great Britain	Marayke Jonkers; Australia
100 m breaststroke SB4	Béatrice Hess; France	Inbal Pezaro; Israel	Teresa Perales; Spain
100 m breaststroke SB5	Kirsten Bruhn; Germany	Nyree Lewis; Great Britain	Gitta Ráczkó; Hungary
100 m breaststroke SB6	Sarah Bowen; Australia	Liz Johnson; Great Britain	Deborah Gruen; United States
100 m breaststroke SB7	Erin Popovich; United States	Kristin Ros Hakonardottir; Iceland	Min Huang; China
100 m breaststroke SB8	Sisse Grynet Egeborg; Denmark	Mikhaila Rutherford; United States	Beth Riggle; United States
100 m breaststroke SB9	Katerina Coufalova; Czech Republic	Sarah Bailey; Great Britain	Carly Haynie; United States
100 m breaststroke SB11	Elaine Barrett; Great Britain	Natalie Ball; Germany	Olga Sokolova; Russia
100 m breaststroke SB12	Sandra Gómez Pérez; Spain	Deborah Font; Spain	Yuliya Volkova; Ukraine
100 m breaststroke SB13	Karolina Pelendritou; Cyprus	Kirby Cote; Canada	Prue Watt; Australia
50 m backstroke S2	Sara Carracelas; Spain	Maria Kalpakidou; Greece	Danielle Watts; Great Britain
50 m backstroke S3	Annke Conradi; Germany	Fran Williamson; Great Britain	Susana Barroso; Portugal
50 m backstroke S4	Mayumi Narita; Japan	Edenia Garcia; Brazil	Anne Cecile Lequien; France
50 m backstroke S5	Běla Hlaváčková; Czech Republic	Béatrice Hess; France	Teresa Perales; Spain
100 m backstroke S6	Nyree Lewis; Great Britain	Ludivine Loiseau; France	Doramitzi Gonzalez; Mexico
100 m backstroke S7	Kristin Ros Hakonardottir; Iceland	Kirsten Bruhn; Germany	Chantel Wolfenden; Australia
100 m backstroke S8	Keren Or Leybovitch; Israel	Dóra Pásztory; Hungary	Chantal Boonacker; Netherlands
100 m backstroke S9	Stephanie Dixon; Canada	Natalie du Toit; South Africa	Claire Cashmore; Great Britain
100 m backstroke S10	Mikhaila Rutherford; United States	Anne Polinario; Canada	Esther Morales; Spain
100 m backstroke S11	Qiming Dong; China	Rina Akiyama; Japan	Olga Sokolova; Russia
100 m backstroke S12	Hong Yan Zhu; China	Patrycja Harajda; Poland	Trischa Zorn; United States
100 m backstroke S13	Chelsey Gotell; Canada	Kirby Cote; Canada	Jennifer Butcher; United States
150 m individual medley SM4	Mayumi Narita; Japan	Maggie McEleny; Great Britain	Marayke Jonkers; Australia
200 m individual medley SM6	Natalie Jones; Great Britain	Nyree Lewis; Great Britain	Maria Götze; Germany
200 m individual medley SM7	Erin Popovich; United States	Min Huang; China	Chantel Wolfenden; Australia
200 m individual medley SM8	Dóra Pásztory; Hungary	Immacolata Cerasuolo; Italy	Keren Or Leybovitch; Israel
200 m individual medley SM9	Natalie du Toit; South Africa	Stephanie Dixon; Canada	Claire Cashmore; Great Britain
200 m individual medley SM10	Mikhaila Rutherford; United States	Sarah Bailey; Great Britain	Claudia Hengst; Germany
200 m individual medley SM11	Olga Sokolova; Russia	Marion Nijhof; Netherlands	Natalie Ball; Germany
200 m individual medley SM12	Hong Yan Zhu; China	Patrycja Harajda; Poland	Deborah Font; Spain
200 m individual medley SM13	Kirby Cote; Canada	Prue Watt; Australia	Chelsey Gotell; Canada
4 × 50 m freestyle relay 20 pts	Japan (JPN); Erika Nara; Noriko Kajiwara; Takako Fujita; Mayumi Narita	Great Britain (GBR); Jane Stidever; Fran Williamson; Mhairi Love; Jeanette Chippington	United States (USA); Stephanie Brooks; Melanie Benn; Casey Johnson; Cheryl Angelelli
4 × 100 m freestyle relay 34 pts	United States (USA); Ashley Owens; Erin Popovich; Jessica Long; Kelly Crowley	Canada (CAN); Anne Polinario; Danielle Campo; Andrea Cole; Stephanie Dixon	Australia (AUS); Mandy Drennan; Chantel Wolfenden; Lichelle Clarke; Kat Lewis
4 × 50 m medley relay 20 pts	Great Britain (GBR); Nyree Lewis; Maggie McEleny; Natalie Jones; Jane Stidever	Spain (ESP); Regina Cachan; Noelia Garcia; Teresa Perales; Vanesa Capo	Japan (JPN); Mayumi Narita; Noriko Kajiwara; Erika Nara; Takako Fujita
4 × 100 m medley relay 34 pts	United States (USA); Mikhaila Rutherford; Beth Riggle; Kelly Crowley; Erin Popovich	Canada (CAN); Stephanie Dixon; Anne Polinario; Elisabeth Walker; Darda Geiger	Australia (AUS); Hannah Macdougall; Brooke Stockham; Kate Bailey; Chantel Wolfenden

== See also ==
- Swimming at the 2004 Summer Olympics
