= United States at the 2004 Summer Paralympics =

- Flag of the United States
- IPC code: USA
- NPC: United States Paralympic Committee
- Website: www.teamusa.org/US-Paralympics

in Athens
- Competitors: 235 in 18 sports
- Flag bearers: Kevin Szott (opening); Trischa Zorn (closing)
- Medals Ranked 4th: Gold 27 Silver 22 Bronze 39 Total 88

Summer Paralympics appearances (overview)
- 1960; 1964; 1968; 1972; 1976; 1980; 1984; 1988; 1992; 1996; 2000; 2004; 2008; 2012; 2016; 2020; 2024

The United States sent a delegation to compete at the 2004 Summer Paralympics in Athens, Greece. A total of 235 U.S. competitors took part in 18 sports; the only sport Americans did not compete in was soccer 5-a-side. The United States finished fourth in the gold and overall medal count, behind China, Great Britain and Canada.

== Medalists ==
The following American athletes won medals at the games.

Medal	Name	Sport	Event
Gold	Danny Andrews	Athletics	Men's 400 m T44
Gold	Danny Andrews; Brian Frasure; Raphew Reed; Casey Tibbs	Athletics	Men's 4 × 100 m T42-46
Gold	Danny Andrews; Ryan Fann; Brian Frasure; Raphew Reed	Athletics	Men's 4 × 400 m T42-46
Gold	Cheri Blauwet	Athletics	Women's 800 m T53
Gold	Royal Mitchell	Athletics	Men's 100 m T13
Gold	Royal Mitchell	Athletics	Men's 400 m T13
Gold	Marlon Shirley	Athletics	Men's 100 m T44
Gold	Katie Compton; Karissa Whitsell	Cycling	Women's road race / time trial tandem B1-3
Gold	Katie Compton; Karissa Whitsell	Cycling	Women's individual pursuit tandem B1-3
Gold	Rudy Garcia-Tolson	Swimming	Men's 200 m individual medley SM7
Gold	Kelly Crowley; Jessica Long; Ashley Owens; Erin Popovich	Swimming	Women's 4 × 100 m freestyle 34 pts
Gold	Kelly Crowley; Erin Popovich; Beth Riggle; Mikhaila Rutherford	Swimming	Women's 4 × 100 m medley 34 pts
Gold	Jessica Long	Swimming	Women's 100 m freestyle S8
Gold	Jessica Long	Swimming	Women's 400 m freestyle S8
Gold	Travis Mohr	Swimming	Men's 100 m backstroke S8
Gold	Jarrett Perry	Swimming	Men's 100 m backstroke S9
Gold	Erin Popovich	Swimming	Women's 100 m breaststroke SB7
Gold	Erin Popovich	Swimming	Women's 100 m freestyle S7
Gold	Erin Popovich	Swimming	Women's 200 m individual medley SM7
Gold	Erin Popovich	Swimming	Women's 50 m butterfly S7
Gold	Erin Popovich	Swimming	Women's 50 m freestyle S7
Gold	Michael Prout	Swimming	Men's 400 m freestyle S9
Gold	Mikhaila Rutherford	Swimming	Women's 100 m backstroke S10
Gold	Mikhaila Rutherford	Swimming	Women's 200 m individual medley SM10
Gold	Justin Zook	Swimming	Men's 100 m backstroke S10
Gold	United States women's national wheelchair basketball team: Patricia Cisneros; Janna Crawford; Carlee Hoffman; Emily Hoskins; Jennifer Howittt; Susan Katz; Teresa Lannon; Christina Ripp; Jana Stump; Renee Tyree; Jennifer Warkins; Stephanie Wheeler	Wheelchair basketball	Women's tournament
Gold	Nick Taylor; David Wagner	Wheelchair tennis	Mixed doubles
Silver	Adam Bleakney	Athletics	Men's 800 m T53
Silver	Edwin Cockrell	Athletics	Men's shot put F44/46
Silver	Brian Frasure	Athletics	Men's 100 m T44
Silver	Lex Gillette	Athletics	Men's long jump F11
Silver	Tatyana McFadden	Athletics	Women's 100 m T54
Silver	Marlon Shirley	Athletics	Men's 200 m T44
Silver	Jeffrey Skiba	Athletics	Men's high jump F44/46
Silver	Casey Tibbs	Athletics	Men's pentathlon P44
Silver	Alejandro Albor	Cycling	Men's handcycle road race HC div B/C
Silver	Stuart Flacks	Cycling	Men's tricycle road race CP div 1/2
Silver	Katie Compton; Karissa Whitsell	Cycling	Women's 1 km time trial tandem B1-3
Silver	Paul Martin; Daniel Nicholson; Ron Williams	Cycling	Men's team sprint LC1-4/CP 3/4
Silver	Lynn Seidemann	Equestrian	Mixed dressage freestyle grade I
Silver	United States women's national goalball team Jen Armbruster; Lisa Banta; Nicole Buck; Jessie Lorenz; Asya Miller; Robin Theryoung	Goalball	Women's tournament
Silver	Lorena Pierce	Judo	Women's −70 kg
Silver	Thomas Brown	Sailing	Mixed single person 2.4mr
Silver	Dan Jordan	Shooting	Men's free rifle 3 x 40 SH1
Silver	Melanie Benn	Swimming	Women's 50 m freestyle S4
Silver	Curtis Lovejoy	Swimming	Men's 100 m freestyle S2
Silver	Travis Mohr	Swimming	Men's 100 m breaststroke SB6
Silver	Mikhaila Rutherford	Swimming	Women's 100 m breaststroke SB8
Silver	David Wagner	Wheelchair tennis	Mixed singles
Bronze	Aaron Cross; Jeffrey Fabry; Kevin Stone	Archery	Men's teams open
Bronze	Jeffrey Fabry	Archery	Men's individual W1
Bronze	Cheri Blauwet	Athletics	Women's 5,000 m T54
Bronze	Cheri Blauwet	Athletics	Women's marathon T54
Bronze	Ryan Fann	Athletics	Men's 400 m T44
Bronze	Brian Frasure	Athletics	Men's 200 m T44
Bronze	Joshua George	Athletics	Men's 100 m T53
Bronze	Joshua George	Athletics	Men's 400 m T53
Bronze	April Holmes	Athletics	Women's long jump F44/46
Bronze	Jill Kennedy	Athletics	Women's discus throw F40
Bronze	Jill Kennedy	Athletics	Women's javelin throw F40
Bronze	Tatyana McFadden	Athletics	Women's 200 m T54
Bronze	Marlon Shirley	Athletics	Men's long jump F44
Bronze	Ron Williams	Cycling	Men's road race / time trial bicycle LC2
Bronze	Katie Compton; Karissa Whitsell	Cycling	Women's sprint tandem B1-3
Bronze	Paul Martin	Cycling	Men's individual pursuit bicycle LC2
Bronze	United States men's national goalball team Christopher Dodds; Daniel Gallant; Tyler Merren; Donte Mickens; John Mulhern Jr. Edward Munro	Goalball	Men's tournament
Bronze	Stephen Moore	Judo	Men's −73 kg
Bronze	Kevin Szott	Judo	Men's −100 kg
Bronze	Jean Paul Creignou; Bradley Johnson; John Ross Duggan	Sailing	Mixed three person sonar
Bronze	Cheryl Angelelli	Swimming	Women's 200 m freestyle S4
Bronze	Melanie Benn	Swimming	Women's 100 m freestyle S4
Bronze	Cheryl Angelelli; Melanie Benn; Stephanie Brooks; Casey Johnson	Swimming	Women's 4 × 50 m freestyle 20 pts
Bronze	Jennifer Butcher	Swimming	Women's 100 m backstroke S13
Bronze	Michael Demarco	Swimming	Men's 50 m breaststroke SB2
Bronze	Deborah Gruen	Swimming	Women's 100 m breaststroke SB6
Bronze	Carly Haynie	Swimming	Women's 100 m breaststroke SB9
Bronze	Lantz Lamback	Swimming	Men's 100 m freestyle S7
Bronze	Lantz Lamback	Swimming	Men's 50 m freestyle S7
Bronze	Curtis Lovejoy	Swimming	Men's 50 m freestyle S2
Bronze	Ashley Owens	Swimming	Women's 400 m freestyle S10
Bronze	Michael Prout	Swimming	Men's 100 m freestyle S9
Bronze	Beth Riggle	Swimming	Women's 100 m breaststroke SB8
Bronze	Justin Zook	Swimming	Men's 50 m freestyle S10
Bronze	Trischa Zorn	Swimming	Women's 100 m backstroke S12
Bronze	Tahl Leibovitz	Table tennis	Men's singles 9
Bronze	United States women's national sitting volleyball team: Allison Ahlfeldt; Allison Aldrich; Bonnie Brawner; Lori Daniels; Kendra Lancaster; Hope Lewellen; Brenda Maymon; Gina McWilliams; Erica Moyers; Penny Ricker; Deborah Vosler; Lora Webster	Volleyball	Women's tournament
Bronze	John Rodgers	Wheelchair fencing	Men's épée individual B
Bronze	United States national wheelchair rugby team: Clifton Chunn; Andy Cohn; Sam Gloor; Will Groulx; Scott Hogsett; Bryan Kirkland; Bob Lujano; Norm Lyduch; Lynn Nelson; Brent Poppen; Wayne Romero; Mark Zupan	Wheelchair rugby	Mixed tournament

Medals by sport
Sport	Gold medal	Silver medal	Bronze medal	Total
Archery	0	0	2	2
Track and field (athletics)	7	8	11	26
Cycling	2	4	3	9
Equestrian	0	1	0	1
Goalball	0	1	1	2
Judo	0	1	2	3
Sailing	0	1	1	2
Shooting	0	1	0	1
Swimming	16	4	15	35
Table tennis	0	0	1	1
Volleyball	0	0	1	1
Wheelchair basketball	1	0	0	1
Wheelchair fencing	0	0	1	1
Wheelchair rugby	0	0	1	1
Wheelchair tennis	1	1	0	2

Multiple medalists
Name	Sport	Gold medal	Silver medal	Bronze medal	Total
Erin Popovich	Swimming	7	0	0	7
Mikhaila Rutherford	Swimming	3	1	0	4
Danny Andrews	Athletics	3	0	0	3
Jessica Long	Swimming	3	0	0	3
Katie Compton	Cycling	2	1	1	4
Brian Frasure	Athletics	2	1	1	4
Karissa Whitsell	Cycling	2	1	1	4
Kelly Crowley	Swimming	2	0	0	2
Royal Mitchell	Athletics	2	0	0	2
Raphew Reed	Athletics	2	0	0	2
Marlon Shirley	Athletics	1	1	1	3
Travis Mohr	Swimming	1	1	0	2
Casey Tibbs	Athletics	1	1	0	2
David Wagner	Wheelchair tennis	1	1	0	2
Cheri Blauwet	Athletics	1	0	2	3
Ryan Fann	Athletics	1	0	1	2
Ashley Owens	Swimming	1	0	1	2
Beth Riggle	Swimming	1	0	1	2
Michael Prout	Swimming	1	0	1	2
Justin Zook	Swimming	1	0	1	2
Melanie Benn	Swimming	0	1	2	3
Tatyana McFadden	Athletics	0	1	1	2
Paul Martin	Cycling	0	1	1	2
Ron Williams	Cycling	0	1	1	2
Curtis Lovejoy	Swimming	0	1	1	2
Jeffrey Fabry	Archery	0	0	2	2
Joshua George	Athletics	0	0	2	2
Jill Kennedy	Athletics	0	0	2	2
Cheryl Angelelli	Swimming	0	0	2	2
Lantz Lamback	Swimming	0	0	2	2

== Competitors ==
=== Archery ===
==== Men ====
Athlete	Event	Ranking round		Round of 32	Round of 16	Quarterfinals	Semifinals	Finals	
Athlete	Event	Score	Seed	Opposition score	Opposition score	Opposition score	Opposition score	Opposition score	Rank
Aaron Cross	Men's individual W1	587	10	Bye	Hassberg (GER); L 150-150	Did not advance			
Jeffrey Fabry	Men's individual W1	667 WR	1	Bye		Antonios (FIN); W 109-102	Cavanagh (GBR); L 108-108	Sebek (CZE); W 108-96	3rd place, bronze medalist(s)
Chuck Lear	Men's individual W1	585	11	Bye	Minami (JPN); L 133-150	Did not advance			
Kevin Stone	Men's individual W2	595	16	Nortmann (GER); W 147-145	Gu (KOR); L 152-162	Did not advance			
Kevin Stone; Jeffrey Fabry; Aaron Cross	Men's teams open	1859	2	Bye		Italy (ITA); W 226-223	Japan (JPN); L 0-215	Great Britain (GBR); W 231-212	3rd place, bronze medalist(s)

==== Women ====
Athlete	Event	Ranking round		Round of 32	Round of 16	Quarterfinals	Semifinals	Finals	
Athlete	Event	Score	Seed	Opposition score	Opposition score	Opposition score	Opposition score	Opposition score	Rank
Lindsey Carmichael	Women's individual standing	603 WR	1	N/A	Hryshko (BLR); W 145-113	Panmai (THA); L 91-98	Did not advance		

=== Athletics ===
==== Men's track ====
Athlete	Class	Event	Heats		Semifinal		Final	
Athlete	Class	Event	Result	Rank	Result	Rank	Result	Rank
Danny Andrews	T44	200m	24.23	4 Q	—N/a		22.96	4
Danny Andrews	T44	400m	53.58	1 Q	—N/a		51.24 WR	1st place, gold medalist(s)
Joseph Aukward	T11	100m	25.79	16	Did not advance			
Adam Bleakney	T53	800m	1:39.48 PR	1 Q	—N/a		1:38.71	2nd place, silver medalist(s)
Adam Bleakney	T53	1500m	3:08.60	25	Did not advance			
Theodore Bridis	T52	800m	2:19.65	10	Did not advance			
Theodore Bridis	T52	1500m	4:08.47	9 q	—N/a		4:21.23	8
Theodore Bridis	T52	5000m	—N/a				15:06.57	8
Herbert Burns	T52	1500m	4:34.16	11	Did not advance			
Herbert Burns	T52	5000m	—N/a				15:44.70	9
Herbert Burns	T52	Marathon	—N/a				2:37:36	6
Tyler Byers	T54	800m	1:42.34	14	Did not advance			
Tyler Byers	T54	5000m	10:33.75	19	Did not advance			
Tyler Byers	T54	10000m	23:05.24	22	Did not advance			
Tyler Byers	T54	Marathon	—N/a				2:01:09	28
Ryan Fann	T44	400m	54.75	5 Q	—N/a		53.64	3rd place, bronze medalist(s)
Brian Frasure	T44	100m	11.23	2 Q	—N/a		11.11	2nd place, silver medalist(s)
Brian Frasure	T44	200m	24.07	3 Q	—N/a		22.83	3rd place, bronze medalist(s)
Joshua George	T53	100m	15.36	3 Q	—N/a		15.30	3rd place, bronze medalist(s)
Joshua George	T53	200m	26.70	3 Q	—N/a		27.44	5
Joshua George	T53	400m	—N/a				3rd place, bronze medalist(s)	
Joshua George	T53	800m	DNF		Did not advance			
Peter Gottwald Jr.	T13	800m	—N/a				2:00.02	5
Peter Gottwald Jr.	T13	1500m	4:05.05	11 q	—N/a		4:08.39	8
Roderick Green	T44	100m	DNF		Did not advance			
Jacob Heilveil	T54	1500m	3:06.25	16	Did not advance			
Jacob Heilveil	T54	5000m	10:25.83	9	Did not advance			
Jacob Heilveil	T54	10000m	21:08.94	2 Q	—N/a		20:59.72	10
Jacob Heilveil	T54	Marathon	—N/a				1:33:11	8
Scot Hollonbeck	T54	1500m	3:01.45	7 q	3:09.15	15	Did not advance	
Scot Hollonbeck	T54	5000m	10:38.43	12	Did not advance			
Scot Hollonbeck	T54	10000m	21:09.29	5 q	—N/a		20:59.78	11
Scot Hollonbeck	T54	Marathon	—N/a				1:49:16	24
Royal Mitchell	T13	100m	11.05	1 Q	—N/a		10.98 PR	1st place, gold medalist(s)
Royal Mitchell	T13	200m	22.45	2 Q	—N/a		DSQ	
Royal Mitchell	T13	400m	—N/a				49.78	1st place, gold medalist(s)
Paul Nitz	T52	100m	—N/a				18.45	6
Paul Nitz	T52	200m	35.97	9	Did not advance			
Nelacey Porter	T12	100m	11.41	10 q	11.06	4 Q	11.05	4
Nelacey Porter	T12	200m	23.38	5	22.66	6	Did not advance	
Nelacey Porter	T12	400m	53.66	8 q	56.51	7	Did not advance	
Raphew Reed Jr.	T46	100m	11.80	9	Did not advance			
Raphew Reed Jr.	T46	200m	23.67	10	Did not advance			
Ian Rice	T52	100m	—N/a				18.11	4
Ian Rice	T52	200m	34.25	6 q	—N/a		33.83	6
Ian Rice	T52	1500m	4:35.87	12	Did not advance			
Marlon Shirley	T44	100m	11.20	1 Q	—N/a		11.08 =WR	1st place, gold medalist(s)
Marlon Shirley	T44	200m	23.50	2 Q	—N/a		22.67	2nd place, silver medalist(s)
Casey Tibbs	T44	400m	54.12	2 Q	—N/a		54.39	5
Chris Waddell	T52	100m	15.66	6 Q	—N/a		15.74	7
Chris Waddell	T52	200m	28.01	8 Q	—N/a		28.10	6
Nelacey Porter; Joseph Aukward; Royal Mitchell; Elexis Gillette	T11-13	4 × 100 m relay	45.18	6	Did not advance			
Raphew Reed Jr. Casey Tibbs; Danny Andrews; Brian Frasure	T42-46	4 × 100 m relay	—N/a				43.90	1st place, gold medalist(s)
Raphew Reed Jr. Casey Tibbs; Danny Andrews; Brian Frasure	T42-46	4 × 400 m relay	—N/a				3:27.00 WR	1st place, gold medalist(s)
Adam Bleakney; Tyler Byers; Joshua George; Jacob Heilveil; Scot Hollonbeck	T53-54	4 × 100 m relay	DNS		Did not advance			
Adam Bleakney; Tyler Byers; Joshua George; Jacob Heilveil; Scot Hollonbeck	T53-54	4 × 400 m relay	3:20.67	7	Did not advance			

==== Men's field ====
Athlete	Class	Event	Final		
Athlete	Class	Event	Result	Points	Rank
Willard Brooks	F53	Discus	16.30	-	10
Willard Brooks	F53	Shot put	6.46	-	8
Joseph Christmas	F56	Discus	26.99	-	9
Edwin Cockrell	F44/45	Shot put	14.81	1019	2nd place, silver medalist(s)
Scott Danberg	F40	Shot put	8.78	-	5
Gabriel Diaz de Leon	F53	Discus	16.11	-	11
Gabriel Diaz de Leon	F53	Shot put	7.03	-	5
Jeffrey Hantz	F55-56	Javelin	30.28	945	8
Jeffrey Hantz	F56	Discus	30.67	-	6
Larry Hughes	F57	Discus	37.02	-	7
Val Don Jacobson	F52-53	Javelin	17.32	904	11
Val Don Jacobson	F53	Discus	21.46	-	4
Roderick Green	F44	Long jump	DNS		
Roderick Green	F44/46	Shot put	DNS		
Vincent Martin	F12	Discus	30.40	-	10
Marlon Shirley	F44	Long jump	6.20	-	3rd place, bronze medalist(s)
Jeffrey Skiba	F44/46	Discus	45.24	905	4
Jeffrey Skiba	F44/46	Javelin	46.44	863	8
Casey Tibbs	P44	Pentathlon	4422		2nd place, silver medalist(s)

==== Women's track ====
Athlete	Class	Event	Heats		Final	
Athlete	Class	Event	Result	Rank	Result	Rank
Cheri Blauwet	T53	800m	1:56.54	1 Q	1:59.05	1st place, gold medalist(s)
Cheri Blauwet	T53	1500m	3:38.14	8 Q	3:29.51	7
Cheri Blauwet	T53	5000m	12:00.07	3 Q	12:00.04	3rd place, bronze medalist(s)
Cheri Blauwet	T53	Marathon	—N/a		1:50.15	3rd place, bronze medalist(s)
Jessica Galli	T53	100m	—N/a		18.66	5
Jessica Galli	T53	400m	58.46	4 Q	1:01.00	4
Jessica Galli	T53	800m	1:57.26	3 Q	2:01.03	4
Jessica Galli	T53	1500m	3:36.82	5 q	3:29.51	7
Jennifer Goeckel	T54	100m	18.21	8 q	18.02	7
Jennifer Goeckel	T54	200m	32.12	10	Did not advance	
Jennifer Goeckel	T54	800m	1:56.15	13	Did not advance	
Jennifer Goeckel	T54	1500m	3:36.82	5 q	3:29.27	5
April Holmes	T46	100m	13.51	8	13.13	6
April Holmes	T46	200m	27.56	7 Q	27.74	7
Erin Johnson	T52	200m	41.47	3 Q	42.48	4
Erin Johnson	T52	400m	1:26.22	6 Q	1:25.33	7
Tatyana McFadden	T54	100m	16.71	2 Q	16.69	2nd place, silver medalist(s)
Tatyana McFadden	T54	200m	30.73	3 Q	30.48	3rd place, bronze medalist(s)
Tatyana McFadden	T54	800m	1:55.15	9	Did not advance	
Pamela McGonigle	T12	800m	2:19.86	3 q	2:26.38	5
Pamela McGonigle	T12	1500m	—N/a		4:56.28	4
Miriam Nibley	T53	100m	—N/a		18.02	4
Miriam Nibley	T53	400m	1:01.39	5 q	1:02.13	6
Miriam Nibley	T53	Marathon	—N/a		DNS	
Shirley Reilly	T53	100m	—N/a		18.81	6
Shirley Reilly	T53	400m	1:01.40	7 Q	1:01.01	4
Shirley Reilly	T53	800m	2:07.99	6 Q	2:02.81	6

==== Women's field ====
Athlete	Class	Event	Final		
Athlete	Class	Event	Result	Points	Rank
April Holmes	F44/46	Long jump	4.56	1134	3rd place, bronze medalist(s)
Jill Kennedy	F40	Discus	19.23	-	3rd place, bronze medalist(s)
Jill Kennedy	F40	Javelin	23.07	-	3rd place, bronze medalist(s)
Jill Kennedy	F40	Shot put	5.74	-	7

=== Boccia ===
Athlete	Event	Preliminaries			Round of 16	Quarterfinals	Semifinals	Final	
Athlete	Event	Opponent	Opposition Score	Rank	Opposition Score	Opposition Score	Opposition Score	Opposition Score	Rank
Timothy Hawker	Mixed individual BC1	Jorgensen (DEN)	L 0-14	4	Did not advance				
Timothy Hawker	Mixed individual BC1	Grossmayer (AUT)	L 0-8	4	Did not advance				
Timothy Hawker	Mixed individual BC1	Ibarburen (ARG)	L 3-5	4	Did not advance				
Timothy Hawker	Mixed individual BC1	Lanoix-Boyer (CAN)	W 4-1	4	Did not advance				
Samuel Williams	Mixed individual BC2	Costa (POR)	L 1-11	5	Did not advance				
Samuel Williams	Mixed individual BC2	Hoon (KOR)	L 1-11	5	Did not advance				
Samuel Williams	Mixed individual BC2	Dijkstra (NZL)	L 1-6	5	Did not advance				
Samuel Williams	Mixed individual BC2	Martin (ESP)	W 4-3	5	Did not advance				
Austin Hanson; Samuel Williams	Mixed pairs BC3	Hyeon (KOR); Hoon (KOR)	L 1-11	4	Did not advance				
Austin Hanson; Samuel Williams	Mixed pairs BC3	Gauthier (CAN); Kabush (CAN)	L 0-6	4	Did not advance				
Austin Hanson; Samuel Williams	Mixed pairs BC3	Macedo (POR); Costa (POR)	L 1-9	4	Did not advance				

=== Cycling ===
==== Men's road ====
Athlete	Event	Time	Rank
Alejandro Albor	Men's hand cycle road race div B/C	1:17.29	2nd place, silver medalist(s)
Alejandro Albor	Men's hand cycle time trial div B/C	18:37.60	5
Seth Arsenau	Men's hand cycle road race div B/C	1:27.29	7
Seth Arsenau	Men's hand cycle time trial div B/C	19:08.75	8
Bradley Cobb	Men's road race / time trial LC3	-	11
Stuart Flacks	Men's tricycle road race CP div 1/2	47:28	2nd place, silver medalist(s)
Stuart Flacks	Men's tricycle time trial CP div 1/2	10:24.83	4
James Harlan	Men's hand cycle road race div A	DNF	
James Harlan	Men's hand cycle time trial div A	16:40.94	6
Gregory Hockensmith	Men's hand cycle road race div B/C	DNS	
Gregory Hockensmith	Men's hand cycle time trial div B/C	18:49.47	7
Paul Martin	Men's road race / time trial LC2	-	12
Albert Michini	Men's road race / time trial CP div 4	-	7
Ron Williams	Men's road race / time trial LC2	-	3rd place, bronze medalist(s)
Daniel Nicholson	Men's road race / time trial CP div 3	1:19.54	4
Jason Bryn; Glenn Bunselmeyer	Men's road race / time trial tandem B1-3	-	10
Matthew King; Eric Degolier	Men's road race / time trial tandem B1-3	-	20

==== Men's track ====
Athlete	Event	Qualification		Final	
Athlete	Event	Time	Rank	Opposition Time	Rank
Bradley Cobb	Men's 4km individual pursuit LC3	4:21.28	10	Did not advance	
Bradley Cobb	Men's 1km time trial LC1-4	—N/a		1:12.08	11
Paul Martin	Men's 4km individual pursuit LC2	5:11.09	3	Williams (USA); W	3rd place, bronze medalist(s)
Paul Martin	Men's 1km time trial LC1-4	—N/a		1:13.40	17
Albert Michini	Men's 4km individual pursuit CP div 4	4:04.06	8	Scott (AUS); L OVL	6
Albert Michini	Men's 1km time trial CP div 3/4	—N/a		1:18.99	12
Daniel Nicholson	Men's 3km individual pursuit CP div 3	4:09.29	5	Did not advance	
Daniel Nicholson	Men's 1km time trial CP div 3/4	—N/a		1:13.28	6
Jason Bryn; Glenn Bunselmeyer	Men's 1km time trial tandem B1-3	DNS			
Jason Bryn; Glenn Bunselmeyer	Men's 4km individual pursuit tandem B1-3	4:50.30	14	Did not advance	
Matthew King; Eric Degolier	Men's sprint tandem B1-3	11.461	9	Did not advance	
Matthew King; Eric Degolier	Men's 1km time trial tandem B1-3	—N/a		1:07.56	8
Daniel Nicholson; Ron Williams; Paul Martin	Men's team sprint LC1-4/CP 3/4	55.411	2	Australia (AUS); L 55.606	2nd place, silver medalist(s)

==== Women's road ====
Athlete	Event	Time	Rank
Barbara Buchan	Women's time trial LC1-4/CP 3/4	28:00.15	4
Allison Jones	Women's time trial LC1-4/CP 3/4	28:41.93	6
Karissa Whitsell; Katie Compton	Women's time road race / time trial tandem B1-3	-	1st place, gold medalist(s)

==== Women's track ====
Athlete	Event	Qualification		Final	
Athlete	Event	Time	Rank	Opposition Time	Rank
Barbara Buchan	Women's 1km time trial LC1-4/CP 3/4	N/A		1:21.63	6
Allison Jones	Women's 1km time trial LC1-4/CP 3/4	N/A		1:19.60	4
Karissa Whitsell; Katie Compton	Women's 1km time trial tandem B1-3	N/A		1:11.22	2nd place, silver medalist(s)
Karissa Whitsell; Katie Compton	Women's 3km time trial tandem B1-3	3:38.80	1	Hou (AUS); Ryan (AUS); W 3:36.82 WR	1st place, gold medalist(s)
Karissa Whitsell; Katie Compton	Women's tandem sprint B1-3	11.864	2	MacPherson (AUS); Lepore (AUS); WO	3rd place, bronze medalist(s)

=== Equestrian ===
==== Individual ====
Athlete	Event	Total	
Athlete	Event	Score	Rank
Barbara Grassmyer	Individual championship test grade III	63.200	11
Barbara Grassmyer	Individual freestyle test grade III	68.444	11
Kathryn Groves	Individual championship test grade IV	61.677	13
Kathryn Groves	Individual freestyle test grade IV	66.500	14
Keith Newerla	Individual championship test grade I	69.684	4
Keith Newerla	Individual freestyle test grade I	58.688	14
Lynn Seidemann	Individual championship test grade I	68.947	5
Lynn Seidemann	Individual freestyle test grade I	76.063	2nd place, silver medalist(s)

==== Mixed team ====
Athlete	Event	Total	
Athlete	Event	Total	Rank
Barbara Grassmyer; Kathryn Groves; Keith Newerla; Lynn Seidemann	Team	399.876	7

=== Football 7-a-side ===
The men's football team didn't win any medals: they were 8th out of 8.

==== Players ====
- Derek Arneaud
- Josh Blue
- Keith Johnson
- Tom Latsch
- Jon McCullough
- Joshua McKinney
- Michael Peters
- Jason Slemons
- John Theobold
- Chris Wolf
- Eli Wolff
- David Woosnam

==== Results ====
Game	Match	Score	Rank
1	United States vs. Brazil (BRA)	0 – 4	4
2	United States vs. Russia (RUS)	0 – 3	4
3	United States vs. Netherlands (NED)	1 – 6	4
7th – 8th classification	United States vs. Ireland (IRL)	0 – 4	8

=== Goalball ===
==== Men's team ====
The men's team won a bronze medal in goalball.

==== Players ====
- Christopher Dodds
- Daniel Gallant
- Tyler Merren
- Donte Mickens
- John Mulhern Jr.
- Edward Munro

==== Results ====
Game	Match	Score	Rank
1	United States vs. Denmark (DEN)	7 – 10	3 Q
2	United States vs. Sweden (SWE)	1 – 1	3 Q
3	United States vs. Canada (CAN)	8 – 12	3 Q
4	United States vs. Germany (GER)	7 – 2	3 Q
5	United States vs. Greece (GRE)	11 – 1	3 Q
Quarterfinals	United States vs. Spain (ESP)	5 – 1	W
Semifinals	United States vs. Denmark (DEN)	1 – 8	L
Bronze medal final	United States vs. Canada (CAN)	5 – 4	3rd place, bronze medalist(s)

==== Women's team ====
The women's team won a silver medal in goalball.

==== Players ====
- Jennifer Armbruster
- Lisa Banta
- Nicole Buck
- Jessica Lorenz
- Asya Miller
- Robin Theryoung

==== Results ====
Game	Match	Score	Rank
1	United States vs. Canada (CAN)	0 – 2	2 Q
2	United States vs. Japan (JPN)	6 – 1	2 Q
3	United States vs. Finland (FIN)	3 – 1	2 Q
4	United States vs. Netherlands (NED)	2 – 0	2 Q
5	United States vs. Germany (GER)	2 – 0	2 Q
6	United States vs. Brazil (BRA)	2 – 0	2 Q
7	United States vs. Greece (GRE)	3 – 0	2 Q
Semifinals	United States vs. Japan (JPN)	3 – 1	W
Gold medal final	United States vs. Canada (CAN)	1 – 3	2nd place, silver medalist(s)

=== Judo ===
==== Men ====
Athlete	Event	Preliminary	Quarterfinals	Semifinals	Repechage round 1	Repechage round 2	Final/ Bronze medal contest
Athlete	Event	Opposition Result	Opposition Result	Opposition Result	Opposition Result	Opposition Result	Opposition Result
Emmanuel Brannon	Men's 66kg	Bye	Cheng (TPE); L 0000–1000	—N/a	Xu (CHN); L 0000S-1112	Did not advance	
Scott Jones	Men's 90kg	Bye	Nine (ALG); L 0000-1000	—N/a	Stoskus (LTU); L 0000-1001	Did not advance	
Marlon Lopez	Men's 81kg	Bye	Jonard (FRA); L 0000-1010	—N/a	White (IRL); W 1000-0000	Morgan (CAN); L 0010-1000	Did not advance
Stephen Moore	Men's 73kg	Bye	Asakereh (IRI); W 0001-0000	Wang (CHN); L 0000-1001	—N/a		Sydorenko (UKR); W 0200-0000 (bronze)
Kevin Szott	Men's 100kg	Matsumoto (JPN); W 0011-0001C	Papachristos (GRE); W 1000C-0010H	Tenorio (BRA); L 0000-1000	—N/a		Shneyderman (RUS); W 0001-0000 (bronze)

==== Women ====
Athlete	Event	Quarterfinals	Semifinals	Repechage round 1	Repechage round 2	Final/ Bronze medal contest
Athlete	Event	Opposition Result	Opposition Result	Opposition Result	Opposition Result	Opposition Result
Lorena Pierce	Women's 70kg	Trachu (THA); W 1000-0000	Bagu (MAS); W 1000-0000	—N/a		Herrera (ESP); L 0000-1100 (silver)

=== Powerlifting ===
Athlete	Event	Result	Rank
Mary Stack	Women's 82.5 kg	NMR	

=== Swimming ===
==== Men ====
Athlete	Class	Event	Heats		Final	
Athlete	Class	Event	Result	Rank	Result	Rank
Mark Barr	S9	50m freestyle	28.09	12	Did not advance	
Mark Barr	S9	100m freestyle	1:00.78	9	Did not advance	
Mark Barr	S9	400m freestyle	4:35.94	3 Q	4:33.60	4
Mark Barr	S9	100m backstroke	1:10.78	10	Did not advance	
Mark Barr	S9	100m butterfly	1:05.98	5 Q	1:04.93	4
Michael Demarco	S3	200m freestyle	4:38.40	10	Did not advance	
Michael Demarco	S3	50m backstroke	1:04.78	8 Q	1:04.64	7
Michael Demarco	SB3	50m breaststroke	1:05.29	2 Q	1:03.20	3rd place, bronze medalist(s)
Michael Demarco	SM3	150m individual medley	4:41.59	10	Did not advance	
Grover Evans	S1	50m freestyle	N/A		2:17.11	5
Grover Evans	S1	100m freestyle	N/A		3:57.78	5
Grover Evans	S1	50m backstroke	N/A		DSQ	
Justin Fleming	S8	400m freestyle	5:02.77	6 Q	5:04.64	7
Justin Fleming	S8	100m butterfly	1:16.94	7 Q	1:18.21	7
Rudy Garcia	S7	100m butterfly	1:17.60	9	Did not advance	
Rudy Garcia	SB7	100m breaststroke	1:27.89	5 Q	1:26.28	5
Rudy Garcia	SM7	200m individual medley	2:42.20 WR	1 Q	2:43.65	1st place, gold medalist(s)
Daniel Kamber	S7	100m backstroke	1:25.49	8 Q	1:27.15	8
Daniel Kamber	S7	50m butterfly	39.16	13	Did not advance	
Mikhael Keyser	S9	50m freestyle	28.31	15	Did not advance	
Mikhael Keyser	S9	100m freestyle	1:02.59	17	Did not advance	
Lantz Lamback	S7	50m freestyle	30.23	4 Q	29.71	3rd place, bronze medalist(s)
Lantz Lamback	S7	100m freestyle	1:05.20	3 Q	1:04.22	3rd place, bronze medalist(s)
Lantz Lamback	S7	400m freestyle	5:10.27	3 Q	5:06.16	4
Lantz Lamback	S7	100m backstroke	1:20.33	4 Q	1:20.59	6
Curtis Lovejoy	S2	50m freestyle	1:09.75	3 Q	1:09.86	3rd place, bronze medalist(s)
Curtis Lovejoy	S2	100m freestyle	2:28.69	2 Q	2:27.46	2nd place, silver medalist(s)
Curtis Lovejoy	S2	50m backstroke	1:04.43 WR	1 Q	1:16.68	5
Joe McCarthy	S4	100m freestyle	1:44.66	9	Did not advance	
Joe McCarthy	S4	50m backstroke	54.79	9	Did not advance	
Joe McCarthy	S4	50m butterfly	DSQ		Did not advance	
Travis Mohr	S8	100m freestyle	1:05.86	8 Q	1:06.09	7
Travis Mohr	S8	100m backstroke	1:13.12	2 Q	1:10.15	1st place, gold medalist(s)
Travis Mohr	SB8	100m breaststroke	N/A		1:29.96	2nd place, silver medalist(s)
Travis Mohr	SM8	200m individual medley	N/A		2:39.62	4
Aaron Paulson	S9	100m backstroke	1:26.60	9	Did not advance	
Aaron Paulson	SB9	100m breaststroke	1:38.70	3 Q	1:36.53	4
Jarrett Perry	S9	400m freestyle	4:38.65	7 Q	4:39.12	7
Jarrett Perry	S9	100m backstroke	1:05.76	1 Q	1:05.35	1st place, gold medalist(s)
Jarrett Perry	SB8	100m breaststroke	1:20.66	5 Q	1:20.09	4
Jarrett Perry	SM9	200m individual medley	2:29.48	6 Q	2:25.81	6
Michael Prout	S9	50m freestyle	28.02	9	Did not advance	
Michael Prout	S9	100m freestyle	59.63	2 Q	59.21	3rd place, bronze medalist(s)
Michael Prout	S9	400m freestyle	4:26.73	1 Q	4:25.42 PR	1st place, gold medalist(s)
Michael Prout	S9	100m backstroke	1:10.33	8 Q	1:08.46	7
Michael Prout	S9	100m butterfly	1:05.99	6 Q	1:05.98	6
Michael Prout	SM9	200m individual medley	2:27.17	4 Q	2:25.15	4
Justin Zook	S10	50m freestyle	25.83	2 Q	25.61	3rd place, bronze medalist(s)
Justin Zook	S10	100m freestyle	56.95	3 Q	56.50	4
Justin Zook	S10	400m freestyle	4:29.23	4 Q	4:35.03	8
Justin Zook	S10	100m backstroke	1:06.14	1 Q	1:04.22	1st place, gold medalist(s)
Justin Zook	S10	100m butterfly	1:04.30	8 Q	1:04.25	7
Justin Zook	SM10	200m individual medley	2:30.66	10	Did not advance	
Lantz Lamback; Joe McCarthy; Daniel Kamber; Curtis Lovejoy	N/A	4 × 50 m freestyle relay (20pts)	3:07.13	9	Did not advance	
Michael Prout; Lantz Lamback; Mark Barr; Mikhael Keyser	N/A	4 × 100 m freestyle relay (34pts)	4:09.07	3 Q	4:08.74	5
Justin Fleming; Aaron Paulson; Joe McCarthy; Michael Demarco	N/A	4 × 50 m medley relay (20pts)	3:09.35	10	Did not advance	
Michael Prout; Cody Bureau; Rudy Garcia; Mikhael Keyser	N/A	4 × 100 m medley relay (34pts)	4:44.49	7 Q	4:37.82	7

==== Women ====
Athlete	Class	Event	Heats		Final	
Athlete	Class	Event	Result	Rank	Result	Rank
Cheryl Angelelli	S4	50m freestyle	53.37	2 Q	53.23	4
Cheryl Angelelli	S4	100m freestyle	1:52.56	4 Q	1:52.07	4
Cheryl Angelelli	S4	200m freestyle	3:57.44	3 Q	3:51.41	3rd place, bronze medalist(s)
Melanie Benn	S4	50m freestyle	56.42	6 Q	52.50	2nd place, silver medalist(s)
Melanie Benn	S4	100m freestyle	1:51.56	3 Q	1:51.59	3rd place, bronze medalist(s)
Melanie Benn	S4	50m backstroke	1:05.64	6 Q	1:04.59	6
Kelley Becherer	S13	400m freestyle	N/A		5:01.96	5
Kelley Becherer	S13	100m backstroke	1:19.97	7 Q	1:18.86	8
Kelley Becherer	SB13	100m breaststroke	N/A		1:29.70	6
Kelley Becherer	SM13	200m individual medley	N/A		2:50.07	6
Stephanie Brooks	S6	50m freestyle	42.80	11	Did not advance	
Stephanie Brooks	S6	100m freestyle	1:28.13	8 Q	1:28.59	8
Stephanie Brooks	S6	400m freestyle	6:39.98	7 Q	6:37.20	6
Aimee Bruder	S4	50m freestyle	56.60	7 Q	56.60	8
Aimee Bruder	S4	100m freestyle	1:53.92	6 Q	1:53.99	6
Aimee Bruder	S4	200m freestyle	3:58.00	4 Q	3:55.87	4
Aimee Bruder	S4	50m backstroke	1:10.06	8 Q	1:07.76	8
Aimee Bruder	SB3	50m breaststroke	1:12.73	5 Q	1:13.40	5
Aimee Bruder	SM4	150m individual medley	3:40.95	7 Q	3:41.35	6
Jennifer Butcher	S13	50m freestyle	29.94	5 Q	29.70	5
Jennifer Butcher	S13	100m freestyle	1:06.87	9	Did not advance	
Jennifer Butcher	S13	100m backstroke	1:16.51	4 Q	1:15.75	3rd place, bronze medalist(s)
Sarah Castle	S8	50m freestyle	38.21	14	Did not advance	
Sarah Castle	S8	100m freestyle	1:23.66	15	Did not advance	
Sarah Castle	SB6	100m breaststroke	1:50.88	4 Q	1:48.32	4
Julie Crisp	S7	100m backstroke	1:33.49	4 Q	1:34.96	5
Julie Crisp	SM7	200m individual medley	3:37.92	9	Did not advance	
Kelly Crowley	S9	50m freestyle	31.56	3 Q	31.25	4
Kelly Crowley	S9	100m freestyle	1:08.47	3 Q	1:08.22	4
Kelly Crowley	S9	400m freestyle	5:20.59	8 Q	5:17.87	7
Kelly Crowley	S9	100m butterfly	1:18.37	6 Q	1:18.29	6
Kelly Crowley	SM9	200m individual medley	2:53.22	6 Q	2:49.47	5
Toni Davis	S8	50m freestyle	35.23	7 Q	35.03	7
Toni Davis	S8	100m butterfly	1:25.98	3 Q	1:26.74	4
Jen Durrant	S9	100m backstroke	1:20.46	8 Q	1:20.33	7
Ivy Garrison	S9	100m butterfly	1:20.28	9	Did not advance	
Deborah Gruen	S7	100m freestyle	1:29.30	15	Did not advance	
Deborah Gruen	S7	400m freestyle	6:06.34	6 Q	6:09.37	7
Deborah Gruen	S7	50m butterfly	48.73	12	Did not advance	
Deborah Gruen	SB7	100m breaststroke	1:47.12	3 Q	1:46.52	3rd place, bronze medalist(s)
Deborah Gruen	SM7	200m individual medley	3:30.71	7 Q	3:32.96	8
Carly Haynie	SB9	100m breaststroke	1:26.29	2 Q	1:25.92	3rd place, bronze medalist(s)
Casey Johnson	S6	50m butterfly	44.56	7 Q	45.37	8
Casey Johnson	SM6	200m individual medley	3:52.96	8 Q	3:31.37	5
Anessa Kemna	S11	50m freestyle	39.12	12	Did not advance	
Anessa Kemna	S11	100m freestyle	1:22.89	9	Did not advance	
Anessa Kemna	S11	100m backstroke	1:37.00	8	1:39.09	8
Anessa Kemna	SB11	100m breaststroke	1:46.38	6 Q	1:44.40	6
Anessa Kemna	SM11	200m individual medley	N/A		3:23.10	5
Angel Langner	S6	50m butterfly	45.62	8 Q	44.08	7
Jessica Long	S8	50m freestyle	33.30	4 Q	33.60	5
Jessica Long	S8	100m freestyle	1:10.73	1 Q	1:09.67 PR	1st place, gold medalist(s)
Jessica Long	S8	400m freestyle	5:12.87	1 Q	5:07.88 PR	1st place, gold medalist(s)
Ashley Nashleanas	S11	50m freestyle	42.15	13	Did not advance	
Ashley Nashleanas	S11	100m freestyle	1:30.89	11	Did not advance	
Ashley Nashleanas	S11	100m backstroke	1:37.87	9	Did not advance	
Ashley Owens	S10	50m freestyle	31.21	7 Q	31.11	7
Ashley Owens	S10	100m freestyle	1:06.49	4 Q	1:06.27	6
Ashley Owens	S10	400m freestyle	5:00.17	1 Q	4:57.77	3rd place, bronze medalist(s)
Erin Popovich	S7	50m freestyle	35.13	1 Q	34.34 WR	1st place, gold medalist(s)
Erin Popovich	S7	100m freestyle	1:15.62	2 Q	1:14.61 PR	1st place, gold medalist(s)
Erin Popovich	S7	50m butterfly	39.03	4 Q	37.37 WR	1st place, gold medalist(s)
Erin Popovich	SB7	100m breaststroke	1:39.89	2 Q	1:38.66	1st place, gold medalist(s)
Erin Popovich	SM7	200m individual medley	3:09.42 PR	1 Q	3:05.57 WR	1st place, gold medalist(s)
Beth Riggle	SB8	100m breaststroke	1:30.93	3 Q	1:29.66	3rd place, bronze medalist(s)
Mikhaila Rutherford	S10	100m backstroke	N/A		1:12.25	1st place, gold medalist(s)
Mikhaila Rutherford	SB8	100m breaststroke	1:28.03	2 Q	1:27.68	2nd place, silver medalist(s)
Mikhaila Rutherford	SM10	200m individual medley	2:42.93	1 Q	2:38.10	1st place, gold medalist(s)
Elizabeth Stone	S9	100m backstroke	1:17.27	3 Q	1:18.93	5
Elizabeth Stone	S9	100m butterfly	1:27.96	13	Did not advance	
Brandi Van Anne	S6	100m freestyle	1:44.03	15	Did not advance	
Brandi Van Anne	S6	50m butterfly	55.46	15	Did not advance	
Brandi Van Anne	SB6	100m breaststroke	2:01.44	9	Did not advance	
Brandi Van Anne	SM6	200m individual medley	3:59.57	11	Did not advance	
Carrie Willoughby	S13	50m freestyle	30.03	6 Q	29.96	7
Carrie Willoughby	S13	100m freestyle	1:05.32	5 Q	1:04.34	5
Carrie Willoughby	S13	400m freestyle	N/A		5:08.12	8
Carrie Willoughby	S13	100m backstroke	1:16.12	3 Q	1:15.94	4
Carrie Willoughby	S13	100m butterfly	N/A		1:11.02	4
Tiffanie Wright	S13	50m freestyle	29.75	4 Q	29.14	4
Tiffanie Wright	S13	100m freestyle	1:04.22	3 Q	1:04.34	5
Tiffanie Wright	S13	400m freestyle	N/A		5:03.29	6
Tiffanie Wright	SM13	200m individual medley	N/A		2:57.61	7
Trischa Zorn	S12	50m freestyle	30.83	7 Q	30.78	7
Trischa Zorn	S12	100m freestyle	1:07.95	7 Q	1:07.58	7
Trischa Zorn	S12	100m backstroke	N/A		1:14.99	3rd place, bronze medalist(s)
Trischa Zorn	SM12	200m individual medley	2:47.49	6 Q	2:46.52	6
Stephanie Brooks; Melanie Benn; Casey Johnson; Cheryl Angelelli	N/A	4 × 50 m freestyle relay (20pts)	N/A		3:12.80	3rd place, bronze medalist(s)
Ashley Owens; Erin Popovich; Jessica Long; Kelly Crowley	N/A	4 × 100 m freestyle relay (34pts)	N/A		4:40.57	1st place, gold medalist(s)
Melanie Benn; Sarah Castle; Casey Johnson; Cheryl Angelelli	N/A	4 × 50 m medley relay (20pts)	N/A		3:38.62	5
Mikhaila Rutherford; Beth Riggle; Kelly Crowley; Erin Popovich	N/A	4 × 100 m medley relay (34pts)	N/A		5:14.08	1st place, gold medalist(s)

=== Table tennis ===
==== Men ====
Athlete	Event	Preliminaries				Round of 16	Quarterfinals	Semifinals	Final / BM	
Athlete	Event	Opposition Result	Opposition Result	Opposition Result	Rank	Opposition Result	Opposition Result	Opposition Result	Opposition Result	Rank
Tahl Leibovitz	Men's singles 9	Tomioka (JPN); L 0-3	Rahbari (IRI); W 3-0	Rakic (CRO); W 3-1	2	Last (NED); W 3-1	Shan (TPE); W 3-0	Fraczyk (AUT); L 0-3	Zborai (HUN); W 3-0	3rd place, bronze medalist(s)
Wayne Lo	Men's singles 8	Ledoux (BEL); L 2–3	Soukup (CZE); L 3–0	du Plooy (RSA); W 3–1	3	Did not advance				

==== Women ====
Athlete	Event	Preliminaries				Quarterfinals	Semifinals	Final / BM	
Athlete	Event	Opposition Result	Opposition Result	Opposition Result	Rank	Opposition Result	Opposition Result	Opposition Result	Rank
Jennifer Johnson	Women's singles 4	Zorzetto (ITA); L 0–3	Dolinar (SLO); L 0–3	Arenales (MEX); L 0–3	4	Did not advance			

=== Volleyball ===
==== Men's team ====
The men's volleyball team didn't win any medals: they were placed 6th out of 8.

==== Players ====
- Rene Aquino
- Eric Duda
- Joey Evans
- Essam Hamido
- Tracey Lange
- Curtis Lease
- Jeffrey MacMunn
- Paul Moran
- Robert Osbahr
- Brent Rasmussen
- Chris Seilkop
- William Steen

==== Results ====
Game	Match	Score	Rank
1	United States vs. Bosnia and Herzegovina (BIH)	0 – 3	3 Q
2	United States vs. Egypt (EGY)	0 – 3	3 Q
3	United States vs. Greece (GRE)	3 – 1	3 Q
Quarterfinals	United States vs. Germany (GER)	0 – 3	L
5th – 8th Semifinals	United States vs. Japan (JPN)	3 – 2	W
Fifth place	United States vs. Finland (FIN)	0 – 3	6

==== Women's team ====
The women's volleyball team won a bronze medal.

==== Players ====
- Allison Ahlfeldt
- Allison Aldrich
- Bonnie Brawner
- Lori Daniels
- Kendra Lancastier
- Hope Lewellen
- Brenda Maymon
- Gina McWilliams
- Erica Moyers
- Penny Ricker
- Deborah Vosler
- Lora Webster

==== Results ====
Game	Match	Score	Rank
1	United States vs. China (CHN)	0 – 3	3 Q
2	United States vs. Netherlands (NED)	0 – 3	3 Q
3	United States vs. Slovenia (SLO)	3 – 2	3 Q
4	United States vs. Finland (FIN)	3 – 2	3 Q
5	United States vs. Ukraine (UKR)	3 – 2	3 Q
Semifinals	United States vs. Netherlands (NED)	0 – 3	L
Bronze medal final	United States vs. Slovenia (SLO)	3 – 1	3rd place, bronze medalist(s)

=== Wheelchair basketball ===
==== Men's team ====
The men's team didn't win any medals. They were 7th out of 12.

==== Players ====
- Juan Angulo
- Gavin Cloy
- Jeff Dills
- Jeffrey James Glasbrenner
- Jeffrey Griffin
- Lawrence Johnson
- Jeremy Lade
- Jason Nelms
- Mike Paye
- Jermell Pennie
- Matt Scott
- Josh Turek

==== Results ====
Game	Match	Score	Rank
1	United States vs. Netherlands (NED)	66 – 82	2 Q
2	United States vs. Germany (GER)	71 – 49	2 Q
3	United States vs. Japan (JPN)	54 – 46	2 Q
4	United States vs. Iran (IRI)	73 – 50	2 Q
5	United States vs. Greece (GRE)	85 – 27	2 Q
Quarterfinals	United States vs. Great Britain (GBR)	59 – 62	L
7/8th classification	United States vs. Japan (JPN)	79 – 56	7

==== Women's team ====
The women's team won the gold medal in wheelchair basketball.

==== Players ====
- Patricia Cisneros
- Janna Crawford
- Carlee Hoffman
- Emily Hoskins
- Jennifer Howitt
- Susan Katz
- Teresa Lannon
- Christina Ripp
- Jana Stump
- Renee Tyree
- Jennifer Warkins
- Stephanie Walker

==== Results ====
Game	Match	Score	Rank
1	United States vs. Australia (AUS)	61 – 62	2 Q
2	United States vs. Great Britain (GBR)	74 – 24	2 Q
3	United States vs. Netherlands (NED)	57 – 38	2 Q
Quarterfinals	United States vs. Japan (JPN)	70 – 33	W
Semifinals	United States vs. Canada (CAN)	57 – 40	W
Gold medal final	United States vs. Australia (AUS)	56 – 44	1st place, gold medalist(s)

=== Wheelchair fencing ===
==== Men ====
Athlete	Event	Qualification			Round of 16	Quarterfinal	Semifinal	Final / BM	
Athlete	Event	Opposition	Score	Rank	Opposition Score	Opposition Score	Opposition Score	Opposition Score	Rank
Gerard Moreno	Men's foil B	Czop (POL)	L 1-5	3 Q	Alsaedi (KUW); L 3-15	Did not advance			
Gerard Moreno	Men's foil B	Latreche (FRA)	L 3-5	3 Q	Alsaedi (KUW); L 3-15	Did not advance			
Gerard Moreno	Men's foil B	Sarri (ITA)	W 5-3	3 Q	Alsaedi (KUW); L 3-15	Did not advance			
Gerard Moreno	Men's foil B	Bogdos (GRE)	W 5-0	3 Q	Alsaedi (KUW); L 3-15	Did not advance			
Gerard Moreno	Men's sabre B	Czop (POL)	L 2-5	6	Did not advance				
Gerard Moreno	Men's sabre B	Mari (ITA)	L 4-5	6	Did not advance				
Gerard Moreno	Men's sabre B	Hui (HKG)	L 3-5	6	Did not advance				
Gerard Moreno	Men's sabre B	Park (KOR)	L 3-5	6	Did not advance				
Gerard Moreno	Men's sabre B	Arnau (ESP)	L 3-5	6	Did not advance				
John Rodgers	Men's épée B	Liang (CHN)	L 4-5	3 Q	Park (KOR); W 15-7	Liang (CHN); W 15-9	Wysmierski (POL); L 15-5	Wong (HKG); W 15-10	3rd place, bronze medalist(s)
John Rodgers	Men's épée B	Shenkevych (UKR)	L 4-5	3 Q	Park (KOR); W 15-7	Liang (CHN); W 15-9	Wysmierski (POL); L 15-5	Wong (HKG); W 15-10	3rd place, bronze medalist(s)
John Rodgers	Men's épée B	Wysmierski (POL)	W 5-3	3 Q	Park (KOR); W 15-7	Liang (CHN); W 15-9	Wysmierski (POL); L 15-5	Wong (HKG); W 15-10	3rd place, bronze medalist(s)
John Rodgers	Men's épée B	François (FRA)	W 5-2	3 Q	Park (KOR); W 15-7	Liang (CHN); W 15-9	Wysmierski (POL); L 15-5	Wong (HKG); W 15-10	3rd place, bronze medalist(s)
John Rodgers	Men's épée B	Heaton (GBR)	W 5-2	3 Q	Park (KOR); W 15-7	Liang (CHN); W 15-9	Wysmierski (POL); L 15-5	Wong (HKG); W 15-10	3rd place, bronze medalist(s)
John Rodgers	Men's foil B	Hui (HKG)	L 0-5	2 Q	Latreche (FRA); W 15-9	Chung (HKG); W 15-10	Hui (HKG); L 8-15	Komar (UKR); L 11-15	4
John Rodgers	Men's foil B	Shenkevych (UKR)	W 5-1	2 Q	Latreche (FRA); W 15-9	Chung (HKG); W 15-10	Hui (HKG); L 8-15	Komar (UKR); L 11-15	4
John Rodgers	Men's foil B	Lewonowski (POL)	W 5-1	2 Q	Latreche (FRA); W 15-9	Chung (HKG); W 15-10	Hui (HKG); L 8-15	Komar (UKR); L 11-15	4
John Rodgers	Men's foil B	Hisakawa (JPN)	W 5-3	2 Q	Latreche (FRA); W 15-9	Chung (HKG); W 15-10	Hui (HKG); L 8-15	Komar (UKR); L 11-15	4
Mario Rodriguez	Men's foil A	Pender (POL)	L 0-5	5	Did not advance				
Mario Rodriguez	Men's foil A	Kwong (HKG)	L 0-5	5	Did not advance				
Mario Rodriguez	Men's foil A	Citerne (FRA)	L 0-5	5	Did not advance				
Mario Rodriguez	Men's foil A	Peppas (GRE)	L 4-5	5	Did not advance				
Mario Rodriguez	Men's sabre A	Pellegrini (ITA)	L 1-5	3 Q	Chan (HKG); L 11-15	Did not advance			
Mario Rodriguez	Men's sabre A	Fung (HKG)	L 1-5	3 Q	Chan (HKG); L 11-15	Did not advance			
Mario Rodriguez	Men's sabre A	Lipinski (GER)	W 5-4	3 Q	Chan (HKG); L 11-15	Did not advance			
Mario Rodriguez	Men's sabre A	Sanchez (ESP)	W 5-2	3 Q	Chan (HKG); L 11-15	Did not advance			
Sean Shumate	Men's épée B	Mayer (GER)	L 2-5	6	Did not advance				
Sean Shumate	Men's épée B	Lewonowski (POL)	L 1-5	6	Did not advance				
Sean Shumate	Men's épée B	Wong (HKG)	L 1-5	6	Did not advance				
Sean Shumate	Men's épée B	Latreche (FRA)	L 3-5	6	Did not advance				
Sean Shumate	Men's épée B	Alsaedi (KUW)	L 4-5	6	Did not advance				
Sean Shumate	Men's sabre B	Wysmierski (POL)	L 0-5	7	Did not advance				
Sean Shumate	Men's sabre B	Durand (FRA)	L 1-5	7	Did not advance				
Sean Shumate	Men's sabre B	Mayer (GER)	L 2-5	7	Did not advance				
Sean Shumate	Men's sabre B	Szekeres (HUN)	L 1-5	7	Did not advance				
Sean Shumate	Men's sabre B	Heaton (GBR)	L 3-5	7	Did not advance				
Sean Shumate	Men's sabre B	Bogdos (GRE)	L 1-5	7	Did not advance				
Gary van der Wege	Men's épée A	Maillard (FRA)	L 2–5	6	Did not advance				
Gary van der Wege	Men's épée A	Pender (POL)	L 0-5	6	Did not advance				
Gary van der Wege	Men's épée A	Doeme (HUN)	L 1-5	6	Did not advance				
Gary van der Wege	Men's épée A	Zhang (CHN)	L 4-5	6	Did not advance				
Gary van der Wege	Men's épée A	Kwong (HKG)	L 3-5	6	Did not advance				
Gary van der Wege	Men's foil A	Zhang (CHN)	L 2-5	4 Q	Zhang (CHN); L 8-15	Did not advance			
Gary van der Wege	Men's foil A	Makowski (POL)	L 1-5	4 Q	Zhang (CHN); L 8-15	Did not advance			
Gary van der Wege	Men's foil A	Chan (HKG)	L 3-5	4 Q	Zhang (CHN); L 8-15	Did not advance			
Gary van der Wege	Men's foil A	Fernandez (ESP)	W 5-0	4 Q	Zhang (CHN); L 8-15	Did not advance			
Gary van der Wege	Men's foil A	Khder (IRQ)	W 5-2	4 Q	Zhang (CHN); L 8-15	Did not advance			
John Rodgers; Sean Shumate; Gary van der Wege	Men's épée team	N/A				Hong Kong (HKG); L 37-45	5th-7th classification Kuwait (KUW); L 24-45	Did not advance	7
Gerard Moreno; John Rodgers; Mario Rodriguez; Gary van der Wege	Men's foil team	N/A				China (CHN); L 29-45	5th-8th classification France (FRA); L 21-45	7th-8th classification Spain (ESP); W 45-6	7
Gerard Moreno; Mario Rodriguez; Sean Shumate	Men's sabre team	N/A				Italy (ITA); L 25-45	5th-7th classification Spain (ESP); L 41-45	Did not advance	7

==== Women ====
Athlete	Event	Qualification			Round of 16	Quarterfinal	Semifinal	Final / BM	
Athlete	Event	Opposition	Score	Rank	Opposition Score	Opposition Score	Opposition Score	Opposition Score	Rank
Kristina Alexander	Women's épée A	Fan (HKG)	L 0-5	5	Did not advance				
Kristina Alexander	Women's épée A	Picot (FRA)	L 0-5	5	Did not advance				
Kristina Alexander	Women's épée A	Witos (POL)	L 3-5	5	Did not advance				
Kristina Alexander	Women's épée A	Imeri (GER)	L 3-5	5	Did not advance				
Kristina Alexander	Women's foil A	Krajnyak (HUN)	L 0-5	5	Did not advance				
Kristina Alexander	Women's foil A	Meyer (FRA)	L 1-5	5	Did not advance				
Kristina Alexander	Women's foil A	Polasik (POL)	L 0-5	5	Did not advance				
Kristina Alexander	Women's foil A	Imeri (GER)	L 3-5	5	Did not advance				
Susan Gilmore	Women's épée A	Krajnyak (HUN)	L 2-5	5 Q	Trigilia (ITA); L 13–15	Did not advance			
Susan Gilmore	Women's épée A	Polasik (POL)	L 3-5	5 Q	Trigilia (ITA); L 13–15	Did not advance			
Susan Gilmore	Women's épée A	Assmann (FRA)	L 0-2	5 Q	Trigilia (ITA); L 13–15	Did not advance			
Susan Gilmore	Women's épée A	Presutto (ITA)	L 3-5	5 Q	Trigilia (ITA); L 13–15	Did not advance			
Susan Gilmore	Women's épée A	Tani (JPN)	W 5-4	5 Q	Trigilia (ITA); L 13–15	Did not advance			
Susan Gilmore	Women's foil A	Fan (HKG)	L 0-5	5	Did not advance				
Susan Gilmore	Women's foil A	Picot (FRA)	L 0-5	5	Did not advance				
Susan Gilmore	Women's foil A	Rossek (GER)	L 4-5	5	Did not advance				
Susan Gilmore	Women's foil A	Frelik (POL)	W 5-2	5	Did not advance				
Susan Gilmore	Women's foil A	Tani (JPN)	L 1-5	5	Did not advance				
Carol Hickey	Women's épée B	Chan (HKG)	L 2-5	4 Q	Jana (THA); L 1-15	Did not advance			
Carol Hickey	Women's épée B	Jana (THA)	L 1-5	4 Q	Jana (THA); L 1-15	Did not advance			
Carol Hickey	Women's épée B	Palfi (HUN)	L 2-5	4 Q	Jana (THA); L 1-15	Did not advance			
Carol Hickey	Women's épée B	Stollwerck (GER)	W 5-4	4 Q	Jana (THA); L 1-15	Did not advance			
Carol Hickey	Women's foil B	Dani (HUN)	L 0-5	2 Q	Bye	Hassen Bey (ESP); W 15-3	Dani (HUN); L 10-15	Jana (THA); L 5-15	4
Carol Hickey	Women's foil B	Stollwerck (GER)	W 5-2	2 Q	Bye	Hassen Bey (ESP); W 15-3	Dani (HUN); L 10-15	Jana (THA); L 5-15	4
Carol Hickey	Women's foil B	Wong (HKG)	W 5-3	2 Q	Bye	Hassen Bey (ESP); W 15-3	Dani (HUN); L 10-15	Jana (THA); L 5-15	4
Carol Hickey	Women's foil B	de Mello (BRA)	W 5-0	2 Q	Bye	Hassen Bey (ESP); W 15-3	Dani (HUN); L 10-15	Jana (THA); L 5-15	4
Kristine Alexander; Susan Gilmore; Carol Hickey	Women's épée team	N/A				Hungary (HUN); L 19-45	5th-7th classification Germany (GER); L 23-45	Did not advance	7
Kristine Alexander; Susan Gilmore; Carol Hickey	Women's foil team	N/A				Hungary (HUN); L 16-45	5th-7th classification Italy (ITA); L 19-45	Did not advance	7

=== Wheelchair tennis ===
==== Men ====
Athlete	Class	Event	Round of 64	Round of 32	Round of 16	Quarterfinals	Semifinals	Finals
Athlete	Class	Event	Opposition Result	Opposition Result	Opposition Result	Opposition Result	Opposition Result	Opposition Result
John Greer	Open	Men's singles	Lahcen (FRA); L 2–6, 5–7	Did not advance				
Jon Rydberg	Open	Men's singles	Pommê (BRA); W 6–3, 6–3	Harel (FRA); W 6–4, 6–1	Hall (AUS); L 0–6, 3–6	Did not advance		
Larry Quintero	Open	Men's singles	Kruamai (THA); W 7–6, 6–1	Jeremiasz (FRA); L 1–6, 0–6	Did not advance			
Stephen Welch	Open	Men's singles	To (JPN); W 6–1, 6–0	Jaroszewski (POL); W 6–3, 6–0	Bonaccurso (AUS); W 6–1, 6–3	Legner (AUT); W 6–2, 6–3	Ammerlaan (NED); L 5–7, 6–1, 4–6	Jérémiasz (FRA); L 2–6, 4–6
John Greer; Stephen Welch	Open	Men's doubles	Bye		Fischer (FRA); Harel (FRA); W 6–1, 6–3	Bonaccurso (AUS); Hall (AUS); L 4–6, 3–6	Did not advance	
Larry Quintero; Jon Rydberg	Open	Men's doubles	—N/a	Erni (SUI); Pellegrina (SUI); W 6–0, 6–3	Jeremiasz (FRA); Lahcen (FRA); L 2–6, 4–6	Did not advance		

==== Women ====
Athlete	Class	Event	Round of 32	Round of 16	Quarterfinals	Semifinals	Finals
Athlete	Class	Event	Opposition Result	Opposition Result	Opposition Result	Opposition Result	Opposition Result
Sharon Clark	Open	Women's singles	Smit (NED); L 2–6, 3–6	Did not advance			
Julia Dorsett	Open	Women's singles	Lu (TPE); L 6–7, 7–5, 3–6	Did not advance			
Karin Korb	Open	Women's singles	Kalt (SUI); L 6–7, 2–6	Did not advance			
Kaitlyn Verfuerth	Open	Women's singles	Lu (THA); W 7–6, 6–0	Siegers (GER); L 1–6, 2–6	Did not advance		
Sharon Clark; Kaitlyn Verfuerth	Open	Women's doubles	—N/a	Perry (NZL); Courtier (NZL); W 6–2, 6–2	Ohmae (JPN); Yaosa (JPN); L 5–7, 3–6	Did not advance	
Karin Korb; Julia Dorsett	Open	Women's doubles	—N/a	Hong (KOR); Hwang (KOR); L 2–6, 2–6	Did not advance		

==== Quads ====
Athlete	Class	Event	Round of 16	Quarterfinals	Semifinals	Finals
Athlete	Class	Event	Opposition Result	Opposition Result	Opposition Result	Opposition Result
Nick Taylor	Open	Quads singles	Humphreys (GBR); W 6–2, 6–1	de Beer (NED); W 6–2, 6–2	Wagner (USA); L 6–7, 5–7	van Erp (NED); L 4–6, 6–7
David Wagner	Open	Quads singles	Raffaele (ITA); W 6–2, 6–1	Weinburg (ISR); W 7–6, 5–7, 6–3	Taylor (USA); W 7–6, 7–5	Norfolk (GBR); L 3–6, 2–6 (silver)
Kevin Whalen	Open	Quads singles	Norfolk (GBR); L 1–6, 2–6	Did not advance		
Nick Taylor; David Wagner	Open	Quads doubles	—N/a		Hunter (CAN); McPhate (CAN); W 6–0, 6–3	Eccleson (GBR); Norfolk (GBR); W 6–4, 6–1 (gold)

== See also ==
- United States at the 2004 Summer Olympics
- United States at the Paralympics
