= Swimming at the 2004 Summer Paralympics – Women's 50 metre butterfly S7 =

Women's 50m Butterfly S7 at the XII Paralympic Games
- Paralympic Swimming
- Venue: Olympic Aquatic Centre
- Dates: 25 September 2004
- Competitors: 13 from 11 nations
- Winning time: 37.37

Medalists
1st place, gold medalist(s)		Erin Popovich	United States
2nd place, silver medalist(s)		Huang Min	China
3rd place, bronze medalist(s)		Elisabeth Walker	Canada

The Women's 50 metre butterfly S7 swimming event at the 2004 Summer Paralympics was competed on 25 September. It was won by Erin Popovich, representing United States.

== 1st round ==
Qualified for final round

Heat 1

25 Sept. 2004, morning session

Rank	Athlete	Time	Notes
1	Huang Min (CHN)	38.67	
2	Elisabeth Walker (CAN)	38.71	
3	Chantel Wolfenden (AUS)	40.26	
4	Oxana Guseva (RUS)	43.42	
5	Montserrat Canals (ESP)	47.83	
6	Tamara Vaucher (SUI)	49.45	

Heat 2

25 Sept. 2004, morning session

Rank	Athlete	Time	Notes
1	Marlena Lewandowska (POL)	38.88	
2	Erin Popovich (USA)	39.03	
3	Hilde Saeves (NOR)	40.63	
4	Margita Prokeinova (SVK)	41.18	
5	Gitta Raczko (HUN)	43.99	
6	Danielle Campo (CAN)	48.56	
7	Deborah Gruen (USA)	48.73	

== Final round ==
25 Sept. 2004, evening session

Rank	Athlete	Time	Notes
1st place, gold medalist(s)	Erin Popovich (USA)	37.37	WR
2nd place, silver medalist(s)	Huang Min (CHN)	37.47	
3rd place, bronze medalist(s)	Elisabeth Walker (CAN)	38.30	
4	Marlena Lewandowska (POL)	38.33	
5	Chantel Wolfenden (AUS)	38.99	
6	Hilde Saeves (NOR)	39.63	
7	Margita Prokeinova (SVK)	39.97	
8	Oxana Guseva (RUS)	41.61	
