= Riggle =

Riggle is a surname. Notable people with the surname include:

- Beth Riggle (born 1987), American Paralympic swimmer
- Bob Riggle (born 1944), American football player
- Rob Riggle (born 1970), American actor, comedian, and US Marine Corps Reserve officer
