= Swimming at the 2004 Summer Paralympics – Women's 100 metre backstroke S10 =

Women's 100m Backstroke S10 at the XII Paralympic Games
- Paralympic Swimming
- Venue: Olympic Aquatic Centre
- Dates: 25 September 2004
- Competitors: 8 from 7 nations
- Winning time: 1:12.25

Medalists
1st place, gold medalist(s)		Mikhaila Rutherford	United States
2nd place, silver medalist(s)		Anne Polinario	Canada
3rd place, bronze medalist(s)		Esther Morales Fernández	Spain

The Women's 100 metre backstroke S10 swimming event at the 2004 Summer Paralympics was competed on 25 September. It was won by Mikhaila Rutherford, representing United States.

== Final round ==
25 Sept. 2004, evening session

Rank	Athlete	Time	Notes
1st place, gold medalist(s)	Mikhaila Rutherford (USA)	1:12.25	WR
2nd place, silver medalist(s)	Anne Polinario (CAN)	1:15.67	
3rd place, bronze medalist(s)	Esther Morales Fernández (ESP)	1:16.99	
4	Hannah MacDougall (AUS)	1:18.17	
5	Sarah Bailey MBE (GBR)	1:19.36	
6	Katarzyna Brzostowska (POL)	1:20.88	
7	Theresa Griffin (NZL)	1:21.52	
8	Katarzyna Pawlik (POL)	1:22.20	
