= Grant Mizens =

Australian wheelchair basketball player

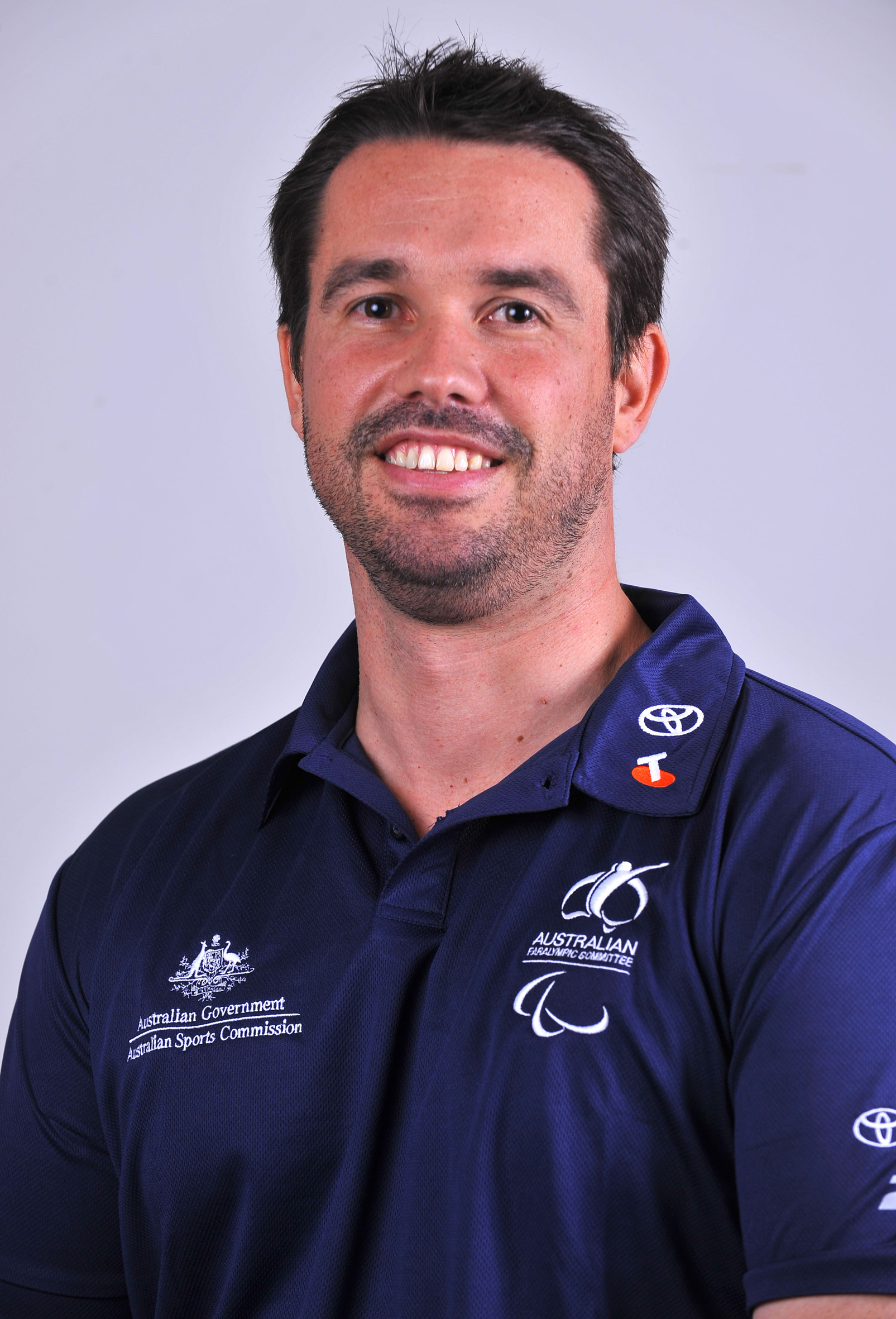
- 2012 Australian Paralympic team portrait of Mizens

Personal information
- Full name: Grant Karlis Mizens
- Nationality: Australia
- Born: 19 April 1977 (age 49) Sydney, New South Wales
- Spouse: Janna Crawford (m. 2008)
Medal record
Wheelchair basketball
Paralympic Games
Silver medal – second place	2004 Athens	Men's wheelchair basketball
Gold medal – first place	2008 Beijing	Men's wheelchair basketball
Silver medal – second place	2012 London	Men's wheelchair basketball
World Championship
Gold medal – first place	2010 Birmingham	Team

Grant Karlus Mizens, OAM (born 19 April 1977) is an Australian wheelchair basketball player. He won one gold and two silver medals at the Summer Paralympics. In June 2025, he was appointed the President of Paralympics Australia. As Paralympics Australia President, he became Vice President on the Brisbane Organising Committee for the 2032 Olympic and Paralympic Games.

== Basketball ==
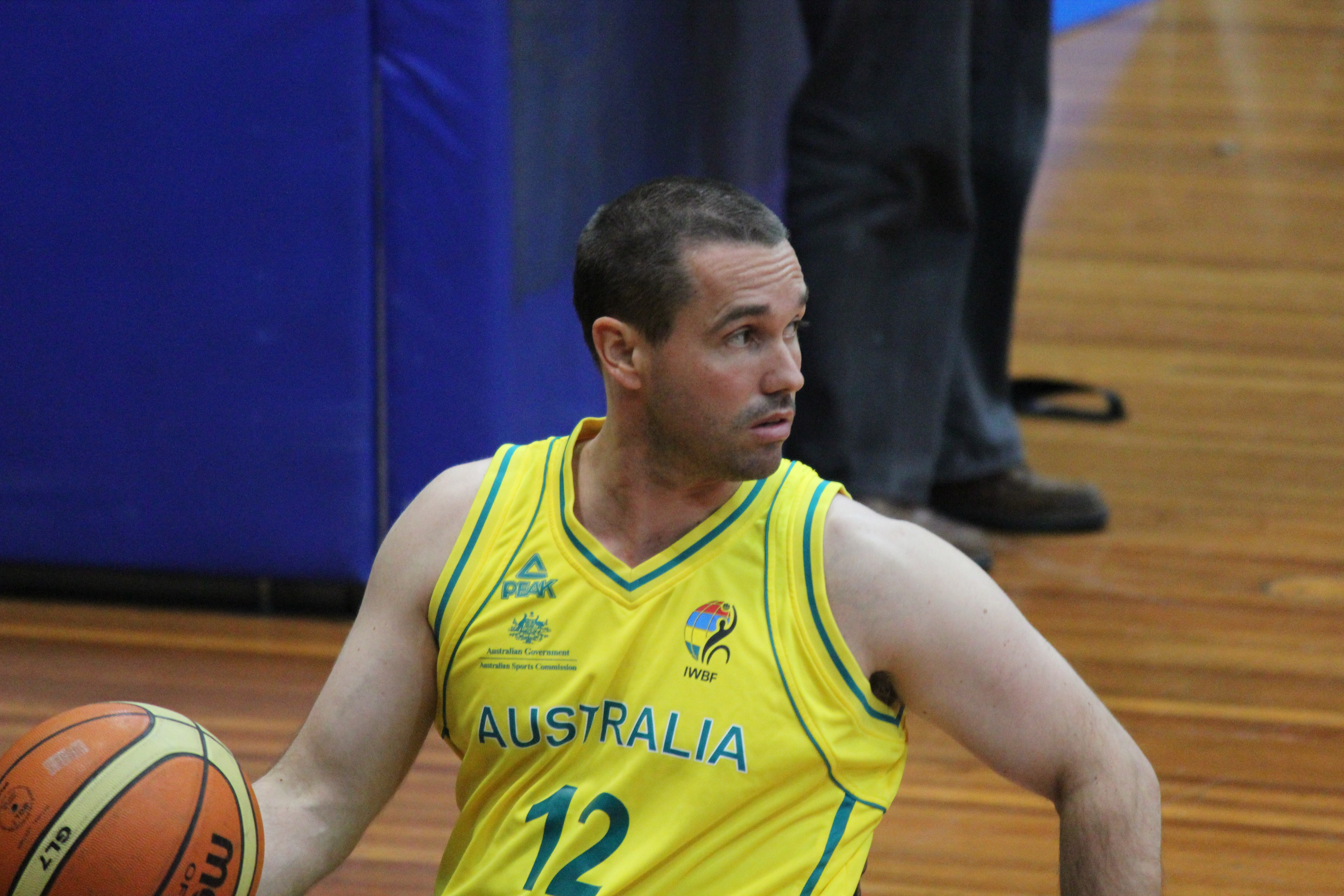
Mizens warming up

He is classified as a 2.0 player and plays guard.

=== National team ===
==== Paralympics ====
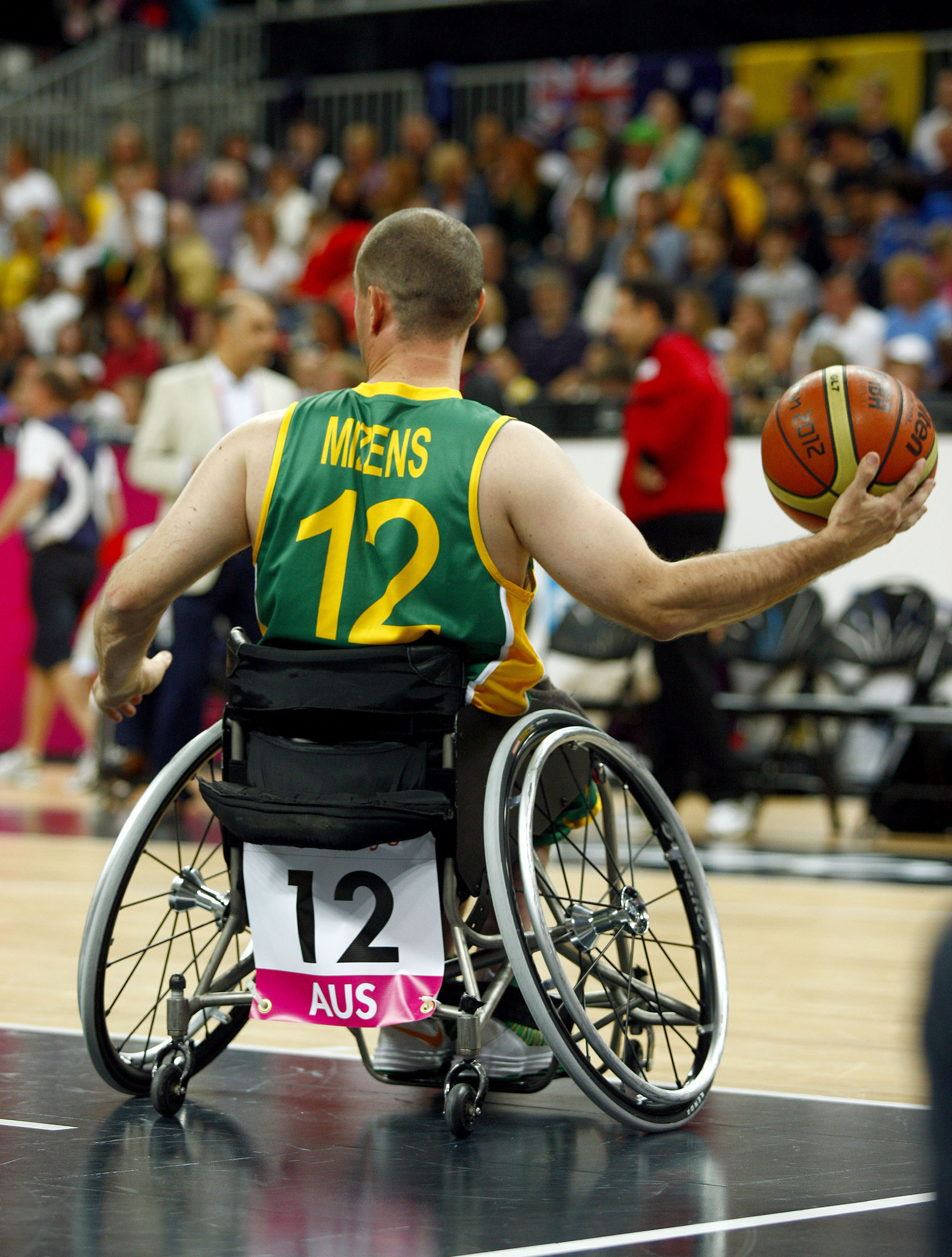
Mizens at the 2012 London Paralympics

He was part of the Australia men's national wheelchair basketball team that won a silver medal at the 2004 Summer Paralympics, and also part of the team that won a gold medal at the 2008 Summer Paralympics, for which he received a Medal of the Order of Australia. At the 2012 Summer Paralympics he was part of the Australian men's wheelchair team that won silver.

==== Other competitions ====
He was a member of the national team that competed at the 2009 IWBF Asia Oceania Championships. He was a member of the Australia men's national wheelchair basketball team that competed at the 2010 Wheelchair Basketball World Championship that won a gold medal.

=== Club basketball ===
Mizens played club basketball for the West Sydney Razorbacks. In 2010, he was playing club basketball with the Wenty League Wheelkings.

== Personal ==
He was born in Sydney, New South Wales. Mizens in his final year of high school was involved in a car accident that led to paraplegia from the waist down. Mizen has completed a Bachelor of Arts in Economics from the University of Illinois and is a Graduate member of the Australian Institute of Company Directors.

In 2020, he was appointed to Paralympics Australia Board, in March 2023 elected vice president and in June 2025 was appointed President. In 2024, he is Portfolio Manager at MLC Asset Management and a member of Sargood Foundation and Sargood Centre Boards.
