= Silver Bow, Butte =

Neighborhood in Butte, Montana, United States

Coordinates: 46°00′13″N 112°40′04″W

Silver Bow is a neighborhood in Butte, Montana, United States. It lies near the interchange of Interstate 15 and Interstate 90, near Rocker. It is the location of a major rail junction on the BNSF Railway. Silver Bow is at Exit 119 off I-15, near the Port of Montana. It is well known locally as the location of the Silver Bow Twin Drive-In.

== Notable person ==
- Erin Popovich, Paralympic swimmer and multiple gold medalist, was raised in Silver Bow
