= Janna Crawford =

American Paralympic wheelchair basketball player

Janna Mizens
Personal information
- Nationality: United States
- Born: Auburn, Washington
- Education: Auburn Senior High School; University of Illinois at Urbana-Champaign
- Spouse: Grant Mizens (m. 2008)
Medal record
Summer Paralympics
Wheelchair basketball
Gold medal – first place	2004 Summer Paralympics	Wheelchair basketball

Janna Lynette Mizens née Ellsworth (born November 18, 1974) is an American Paralympic wheelchair basketball player. She has won a gold medal at the 2004 Summer Paralympics.

== Career ==
Crawford attended the University of Illinois at Urbana-Champaign where she competed on their women's wheelchair basketball team and was named to the second team All-Tournament. She wrote her masters thesis on "Constraints of elite athletes with disabilities in Kenya," which she later published with Monika Stodolska in the Journal of Leisure Research.

She competed with Team USA at the 2000 Summer Paralympics. At the 2004 Summer Paralympics, she recorded nine points and 10 rebounds to help Team USA win gold over Australia.
