= Jennifer Ruddell =

American wheelchair basketball player

Personal information
- Born: Jennifer Warkins; February 4, 1978 (age 48)
- Education: Stevenson High School; University of Illinois (PhD)
- Occupation(s): Wheelchair basketball player and Paralympian

Sport
- Sport: Wheelchair basketball

Jennifer "Jen" Leigh Ruddell (née Warkins; born February 4, 1978) is an American wheelchair basketball player and Paralympian. She won two gold medals as a member of the Team USA’s Women’s Wheelchair Basketball team at the 2004 and 2008 Paralympic Games and a gold medal at the 2007 Parapan American Games.

== Biography ==
Ruddell was educated at Stevenson High School outside Chicago, where she played for the varsity basketball, volleyball and softball teams. She was scouted by college recruiters, but suffered three ligament tears on the same knee.

After discovering that her injury made her eligible to play wheelchair basketball, Ruddell began playing on the University of Illinois women's team. She played in five consecutive national championship games from 2002 to 2006. Ruddell graduated from the University of Illinois with a PhD in Leisure Studies with a focus in Disability Sport.

At the 2004 Summer Paralympics in Athens, Greece, Ruddell was a member of Team USA’s gold medal winning Women’s Wheelchair Basketball team. The team beat five-time defending champions Team Canada in the final match, where Ruddell scored 21 points, 15 rebounds and six steals. The team beat Japan 70-33 in the semi-final match. After the 2004 Athens games, Ruddell moved to Spain to play professional wheelchair basketball for three months. She was also named the University of Illinois Student Athlete of the Year.

At the 2007 Parapan American Games in Rio de Janeiro, Brazil, Ruddell helped lead Team US to win the gold medal at the games.

At the 2008 Summer Paralympics in Beijing, China, Ruddell was the co-captain of Team USA’s gold medal winning Women’s Wheelchair Basketball team. She was honoured alongside her team in Washington D.C.

Ruddell was not called up to the Team USA Women’s Wheelchair Basketball starting team for the 2012 Summer Paralympics in London, England, but was a reserve if other plays could not participate or suffered injury.

In 2016, Ruddell coached the Arizona State University Wheelchair Basketball Team.

In 2018, Ruddell was playing for Arizona Storm Women’s Wheelchair Basketball team and competed at the 2018 National Wheelchair Basketball Association (NWBA) National Women’s Wheelchair Basketball Tournament (NWWBT).

In 2021, Ruddell was inducted into the NWBA Intercollegiate Division Hall of Fame. In 2025, Ruddell was also inducted into the Paralympic Hall Of Fame with the 2004 Women’s Wheelchair Basketball team.

Ruddell has worked as a part-time faculty member at Parkland College. As of 2025, Ruddell works as head of school at Flagstaff Christian School in Arizona.
