= Elisabeth Walker-Young =

Canadian Paralympic swimmer

Personal information
- Nationality: Canadian
- Born: Toronto, Ontario, Canada

Sport
- Country: Canada
- Sport: Paralympic swimming
- Disability class: S7
- Retired: 2005
Medal record
Paralympic swimming
Representing Canada
Paralympic Games
Gold medal – first place	2000 Sydney	Women's 100m butterfly S8
Gold medal – first place	2000 Sydney	Women's 200m individual medley SM7
Gold medal – first place	2000 Sydney	Women's 4x100m medley relay
Silver medal – second place	2004 Athens	Women's 4x100m medley relay
Bronze medal – third place	1996 Atlanta	Women's 100m backstroke S7
Bronze medal – third place	2004 Athens	Women's 50m butterfly S7
World Championships
Silver medal – second place	1994 Malta	Women's 50m butterfly S7
Silver medal – second place	1994 Malta	Women's 200m individual medley SM7

Elisabeth Walker-Young is a retired Canadian Paralympic swimmer, an assistant chef de mission at the 2012 Summer Paralympics and a former chef de mission for the Canadian team at the 2015 Parapan American Games. She received an Order of Canada in 2018 because of her services to the sport within the Paralympic movement at the age of 41. In 2014, Walker-Young was inducted into the Canadian Disability Hall of Fame.

Walker-Young was born without arms but has some fingers at the end of her arms. Elizabeth and her twin sister Rebekah were born in Saskatoon. They were adopted. She moved to Toronto, Ontario at a young age. They attended Gabrielle Roy and lived in Toronto Community Housing at Queen and Jones. Elizabeth received support from Easter Seals and was their ambassador as a child. Her sister Rebekah is a childhood leukemia survivor. Elizabeth's mom worked as a crossing guard.
