= Jana Stump =

American Paralympic wheelchair basketball player

Personal information
- Nationality: United States
- Born: 1975 (age 50–51) Belleville, Kansas, USA
- Education: University of Illinois at Urbana–Champaign
Medal record
Summer Paralympics
Wheelchair basketball
Bronze medal – third place	1996 Summer Paralympics	Wheelchair basketball
Gold medal – first place	2004 Summer Paralympics	Wheelchair basketball

Jana A. Shelfer (née Stump; born 1975) is an American Paralympic wheelchair basketball player. She has won a bronze medal at the 1996 Summer Paralympics and a gold medal at the 2004 Summer Paralympics.

== Early life ==
Stump was born and raised in Belleville, Kansas to parents Jerry and Kathleen. In 1990, on the last day of her freshman year, she became paralyzed after a seat belt broke and threw her into the backseat. After returning to high school in a wheelchair, she was crowned Young Woman of the Year at 18 years old.

== Career ==
After graduating from Belleville High School, she accepted a basketball scholarship at the University of Illinois at Urbana–Champaign. She was a member of Delta Gamma while majoring in Broadcast Journalism. During the 1995–96 season, she was named to the United States women's national wheelchair basketball team to compete at the 1996 Summer Paralympics. As the youngest player on the roster, she helped Team USA win a bronze medal. Upon her return, Stump was named to the NCAA First All–Tournament Team and awarded the Most Improved Player Award. She was also awarded the Pamela Borelli and Family Leadership Achievement Award. The next year, she received the Fourth Year Award before graduating.

In 2004, she was named to the United States women's national wheelchair basketball team that won a gold medal at the 2004 Summer Paralympics. With her broadcasting degree, Stump moved to Orlando to work in media relations for Walt Disney World and at WMFE-FM.
