= Emily Hoskins =

Canadian wheelchair basketball player

Personal information
- Born: Streator, Illinois, US
- Education: Parkland College; BS, 2007, University of Illinois Urbana-Champaign; MA, Murray State University

Sport
- Country: United States
- Sport: Wheelchair basketball (2004–2009)
- Team: United States women's national wheelchair basketball team
- Turned pro: 2004
- Retired: 2009

Achievements and titles
- Paralympic finals: 2004 Summer Paralympics: – Gold; 2008 Summer Paralympics:– Gold

Emily Hoskins is an American wheelchair basketball player. As a member of the United States women's national wheelchair basketball team, she has won two gold medals at the Summer Paralympic Games.

== Early life ==
Hoskins was born in 1983 in Streator, Illinois to parents Greg and Linda. Her father Greg was the advertising manager at The Times-Press and general manager at papers in West Frankfort and Marion, Illinois. Hoskins was born with Neuroblastoma, which merged into her spinal cord and permanently damaged the nerves in her legs.

At age 14, Hoskins became involved in wheelchair basketball while in high school and joined the St. Louis Junior Rolling Rams. While competing with them, she also represented the St. Louis Wheelchair Athletic Association in track and field during her junior year. Although she qualified for the nationals in all of her events, Hoskins was unable to compete due to a spinal fusion.

== Career ==
Upon graduating from Mascoutah Community High School, Hoskins enrolled at Parkland College and became the youngest team member selected for the United States women's national wheelchair basketball team for the 2004 Summer Paralympics. Hoskins was originally named an alternate for the team but a week before the competition she was asked to replace a teammate. With her help, the U.S. women's wheelchair basketball team won their first gold medal since 1988. She was also named the National Wheelchair Basketball Association Women's Most Improved Player. Upon returning to North America, Hoskins transferred to the University of Illinois Urbana-Champaign in 2004.

Hoskins graduated from the University of Illinois Urbana-Champaign in 2007 with a bachelor of science in psychology and began playing with the Phoenix Banner Mercury Wheelchair Team. As a result of her play, Hoskins was again selected to compete for Team USA at the 2008 Summer Paralympics. She helped the team beat Germany 50–38 to repeat as the women's wheelchair basketball champions. Following her second gold medal, Hoskins continued to play with the Mercury Wheelchair Team and competed for the 2010 Friendship Games Osaka Cup.

== Personal life ==
By 2013, Hoskins had moved to Nashville, Tennessee, with her then-boyfriend Cody Campbell and began working with an advocacy group that helps find housing for disabled and elderly citizens. She eventually retired from playing and began coaching the Music City Thunder in the Junior Division.
