= Stephanie Dixon =

Canadian Paralympic swimmer

Personal information
- Born: February 10, 1984 (age 42) Brampton, Ontario, Canada

Sport
- Sport: Swimming
Medal record
Women's swimming
Representing Canada
Event	1st	2nd	3rd
Paralympic Games	7	8	2
Parapan American Games	6	1	0
Paralympic Games
Gold medal – first place	2000 Sydney	100 m Freestyle S9
Gold medal – first place	2000 Sydney	400 m Freestyle S9
Gold medal – first place	2000 Sydney	100 m Backstroke S9
Gold medal – first place	2000 Sydney	4x100 m Freestyle Relay
Gold medal – first place	2000 Sydney	4×100 m Medley relay 34 pts
Gold medal – first place	2004 Athens	100 m Backstroke S9
Gold medal – first place	2008 Beijing	100 m Backstroke S9
Silver medal – second place	2000 Sydney	50 m Freestyle S9
Silver medal – second place	2000 Sydney	200 m Individual Medley SM9
Silver medal – second place	2004 Athens	100 m Butterfly S9
Silver medal – second place	2004 Athens	200 m Individual Medley SM9
Silver medal – second place	2004 Athens	4 × 100 metre freestyle relay 34pts
Silver medal – second place	2004 Athens	4 × 100 metre medley relay 34pts
Silver medal – second place	2004 Athens	100 m freestyle S9
Silver medal – second place	2004 Athens	400 m Freestyle S9
Silver medal – second place	2008 Beijing	400 m Freestyle S9
Silver medal – second place	2008 Beijing	200 m Individual Medley SM9
Bronze medal – third place	2004 Athens	50 m Freestyle S9
Bronze medal – third place	2008 Beijing	100 m Freestyle S9
Parapan American Games
Gold medal – first place	2007 Rio de Janeiro	50m freestyle S9
Gold medal – first place	2007 Rio de Janeiro	400m freestyle S9
Gold medal – first place	2007 Rio de Janeiro	100m backstroke S9
Gold medal – first place	2007 Rio de Janeiro	200m individual medley SM9
Gold medal – first place	2007 Rio de Janeiro	4 × 100 m freestyle relay 34pts
Gold medal – first place	2007 Rio de Janeiro	4 × 100 m medley relay 34pts
Silver medal – second place	2007 Rio de Janeiro	100m freestyle S9
IPC World Championships
Bronze medal – third place	2010 Eindhoven	100 m backstroke S9

Stephanie Dixon, CM (born February 10, 1984) is a Canadian swimmer. She is a three-time Paralympian and competed at the 2000, 2004 and 2008 Paralympic Games prior to retiring from competitive swimming in 2010. During her career, Dixon won nineteen Paralympic medals and seven Parapan American Games medals, and was a 10-time world champion. She is one of Canada's most successful Paralympians.

== Early life and education ==
Dixon was born in Brampton, Ontario to parents Mark Dixon and Joanne MacDonald, and has an older brother, Matthew. She was born missing her right leg and hip and with an omphalocele and began to swim at the age of two. She uses underarm crutches.

She moved to Victoria in 2003 to study psychology from the University of Victoria, where she earned a B.A. and swam for the University of Victoria Vikes. In 2021, Dixon began pursuing a master's degree in kinesiology at the University of Toronto. She finished her master's degree from the Faculty of Kinesiology and Physical Education in November 2023.

== Career ==
=== Para Swimming ===
At the age of 13, Dixon began competitive swimming against athletes without disabilities. At the age of 14, she joined Canada's national Paralympic team, competing in the S9 classification. At age 13, she set a Canadian record in the women's 100-metre backstroke with a time of 1:21.69. She won five medals at the 1997 Canada Games and five medals at the 1997 United States National Championships for Swimmers with a Disability. At the 1998 National Youth Championship in Sherbrooke, she set her first world record, racing the women's 200-metre backstroke in 2:39.39. She won five gold medals at the 1998 International Paralympic Committee (IPC) World Swimming Championships and set two world records (women's 100-metre backstroke and women's 4x100-metre medley relay).

She represented Canada at the 2000 Summer Paralympics in Sydney, at the age of 16, and won five gold medals and two silver medals. With 5 golds, she set the Canadian record for most golds at a single Games. Representing her country again at the 2004 Summer Paralympics in Athens, she won one gold, six silver, and one bronze. At the 2007 Parapan American Games in Rio de Janeiro, she won six gold and one silver medals. She participated in the Paralympic Games for the third time in Beijing in 2008.

Dixon has also won several medals and set several world records at World Championships and at the Commonwealth Games.

In 2010, Dixon retired from competitive swimming.

=== Post-competition ===
In 2011, Dixon moved to the Yukon and became head coach of the Yukon Graylings Master Swim Club.

Dixon was a TV host for the 2013 IPC Swimming World Championships and part of the Canadian Paralympic Committee's broadcast team for the 2014 Winter Paralympic Games. She was part of CBC's broadcasting team for the 2016 and 2018 Paralympic Games. After serving as Team Canada's assistant chef de mission for the Toronto 2015 Parapan American Games, she was Canada's chef de mission for the 2019 Parapan American Games and Tokyo 2020 Paralympic Games.

== Awards and recognition ==
She was added to the Canadian Disability Hall of Fame in 2013 and the Brampton Sports Hall of Fame in 2015. In 2016, she was awarded the Order of Sport, marking her induction into Canada's Sports Hall of Fame. She was appointed to the Order of Canada in 2018.
