= Susan Katz =

American Paralympic wheelchair basketball player

Personal information
- Nationality: United States
- Born: Olney, Maryland
- Education: University of Illinois
Medal record
Summer Paralympics
Wheelchair basketball
Gold medal – first place	2004 Summer Paralympics	Wheelchair basketball

Susan Katz is an American Paralympic wheelchair basketball player. She has won a gold medal at the 2004 Summer Paralympics. She was previously a producer at ESPN.

== Early life ==
Katz was born in Olney, Maryland with mild spina bifida but later moved to California. At the age of ten, her legs became paralyzed after a failed spinal cord surgery. While her parents encouraged her to walk with crutches and braces, she insisted on using a wheelchair. Katz later attended Quince Orchard High School and the University of Illinois, where she played on the wheelchair basketball team.

== Career ==
Katz qualified for the 1996 Summer Paralympics where she competed in discus, javelin and shot put. After qualifying for the U.S. Paralympics Women's Wheelchair Basketball Team in 2004, Katz was a member of the team that won the gold medal at the Paralympic Games in Athens. Over six games on the way to the gold medal, she played 72 minutes and collected 10 points and 17 rebounds.

Upon retiring, Katz became the director of Paralympic and Disability Sport, World Sport Chicago. She also worked with sports network ESPN as an associate producer of their show Around the Horn and production assistant for SportsCenter. In 2013, Katz become the first American woman handcyclist to complete the Ironman World Championship.
