= Sisse Egeborg =

Danish Paralympic swimmer

Personal information
- Born: 1984 (age 41–42) Albertslund, Denmark

Sport
- Sport: Paralympic swimming
- Disability class: S9, SM9, SB8
Medal record
Representing Denmark
World Championships
Gold medal – first place	2002 Mar del Plata	100m breaststroke SB8
Gold medal – first place	2002 Mar del Plata	100m breaststroke SB8
Silver medal – second place	2002 Mar del Plata	200m individual medley SM9
Bronze medal – third place	2002 Mar del Plata	100m butterfly S9
Paralympic Games
Gold medal – first place	2000 Sydney	100m breaststroke SB8
Gold medal – first place	2004 Athens	100m breaststroke SB8

Sisse Grynet Egeborg (born 1984) is a Danish former Paralympic swimmer who competed in international swimming competitions. She is a double Paralympic champion and has competed at the 2000 and 2004 Summer Paralympics.

Egeborg was born without her left forearm.
