= Mikhaila Rutherford =

American Paralympic swimmer

Sport
- Country: United States
- Sport: Paralympic swimming
- Disability: Limb abnormalities due to radiation exposure
- Disability class: S10
Medal record
Paralympic swimming
Representing United States
Paralympic Games
Gold medal – first place	2004 Athens	100m backstroke S10
Gold medal – first place	2004 Athens	200m individual medley SM10
Gold medal – first place	2004 Athens	4x100m medley relay 34pts
Silver medal – second place	2004 Athens	100m breaststroke SB8
World Championships
Gold medal – first place	2002 Mar del Plata	100m backstroke S10
Silver medal – second place	2002 Mar del Plata	100m breaststroke SB8
Silver medal – second place	2002 Mar del Plata	200m individual medley SM10
Silver medal – second place	2002 Mar del Plata	5km open water
Bronze medal – third place	2002 Mar del Plata	100m butterfly S10

Mikhaila Rutherford is an American former paralympic swimmer. She won three gold medals and one silver at the 2004 Summer Paralympics.

== Early life ==
Rutherford was born in a small Russian village around 30 kilometers from Chernobyl, which was the site of a nuclear disaster in 1986. As a result of the disaster, Rutherford was born premature and missing limbs. Due to her disability, her parents put her up for adoption where she was taken in by an American woman at the age of four. She began swimming at the age of eight and competed in swimming competitions in high school.

== Career ==
While attending Alameda High School, Rutherford was invited to compete with Team USA's National Swim Team. She qualified for the 2002 IPC World Championships where she set a new world mark in the S10 Women's 100 backstroke. Rutherford later beat her old world record for the Women's 100 metre backstroke S10 at the 2004 Summer Paralympics, winning gold in the making. She finished the competition with three gold medals and one silver.

After graduating from high school in 2006, Rutherford accepted a placement at Rensselaer Polytechnic Institute with a major in biomedical engineering. In 2018, Rutherford was inducted into the Alameda High School Athletic Hall of Fame.
