= Erin Popovich =

American Paralympic swimmer

Personal information
- Nationality: United States
- Born: Little Rock, Arkansas, US
- Height: 4 ft 4.75 in (1.34 m)
- Weight: 105 lb (48 kg)

Sport
- Sport: Swimming
Medal record
Women's swimming
Representing United States
Paralympic Games
Gold medal – first place	2000 Sydney	100m Freestyle - S6
Gold medal – first place	2000 Sydney	100m Breaststroke - SB5
Gold medal – first place	2000 Sydney	50m Butterfly - S6
Gold medal – first place	2004 Athens	50m Butterfly
Gold medal – first place	2004 Athens	50m Freestyle
Gold medal – first place	2004 Athens	100m Breaststroke
Gold medal – first place	2004 Athens	100m Freestyle
Gold medal – first place	2004 Athens	200m IM
Gold medal – first place	2004 Athens	4x100m Freestyle relay
Gold medal – first place	2004 Athens	4x100m Medley relay
Gold medal – first place	2008 Beijing	200m IM - SM7
Gold medal – first place	2008 Beijing	100m Freestyle - S7
Gold medal – first place	2008 Beijing	100m Breaststroke - SB7
Gold medal – first place	2008 Beijing	400m Freestyle - S7
Silver medal – second place	2000 Sydney	50m Freestyle - S6
Silver medal – second place	2000 Sydney	200m IM - SM6
Silver medal – second place	2000 Sydney	4 x 50 Freestyle relay - S6
Silver medal – second place	2008 Beijing	50m Butterfly - S7
Silver medal – second place	2008 Beijing	50m Freestyle - S7

Erin Popovich is a three-time United States Paralympic swimmer. She has won 14 career Paralympic gold medals, and 19 total.

== Personal life ==
Popovich was born with achondroplasia, a genetic disorder that restricted the growth of her limbs. Her parents, a teacher and a physician, moved their family to Butte, Montana when Popovich was five. During childhood, she wore braces to straighten her back and legs, and underwent about a dozen surgeries. But according to her mother, "we didn't have to make a lot of accommodations for her; we didn't want to treat her too much differently from her siblings." Popovich was interested in sports from an early age. She rode horses and played soccer and basketball. When Popovich was 12, she joined a swim club and by the age of 15, she was competing at the 2000 Paralympic Games.

Popovich received a Bachelor of Science degree from Colorado State University in May 2007, and her hometown is listed as Silver Bow, Montana.

== Swimming career ==
Erin Popovich has participated in three Paralympics. She won three gold medals and three silver medals while setting four world records at the 2000 Paralympic Games in Sydney. Erin was chosen to be one of the 12,012 Torchbearers of the 2002 Winter Olympics torch relay and she carried the torch in Big Timber, Montana on Monday, January 28. At the 2004 Summer Paralympics in Athens, Popovich won seven gold medals in seven races (including two relays), and set three world records and four Paralympic Games records. In 2005, Popovich won the first ESPY Award for Best Female Athlete with a Disability and was named the Women's Sports Foundation Sportswoman of the Year. At the 2008 Summer Paralympics in Beijing, she won an additional four gold and two silver medals, breaking two world records (200m individual medley and 100m breaststroke) and two Paralympic records (100m and 400m freestyle). In 2009, she won the ESPY Award for Best Female Athlete with a Disability for the second time. Following the International Paralympic Committee World Swimming Championships in 2010, Popovich announced her retirement from competitive swimming.

== See also ==
- Athletes with most gold medals in one event at the Paralympic Games
