= Brooke Stockham =

Australian Paralympic swimmer

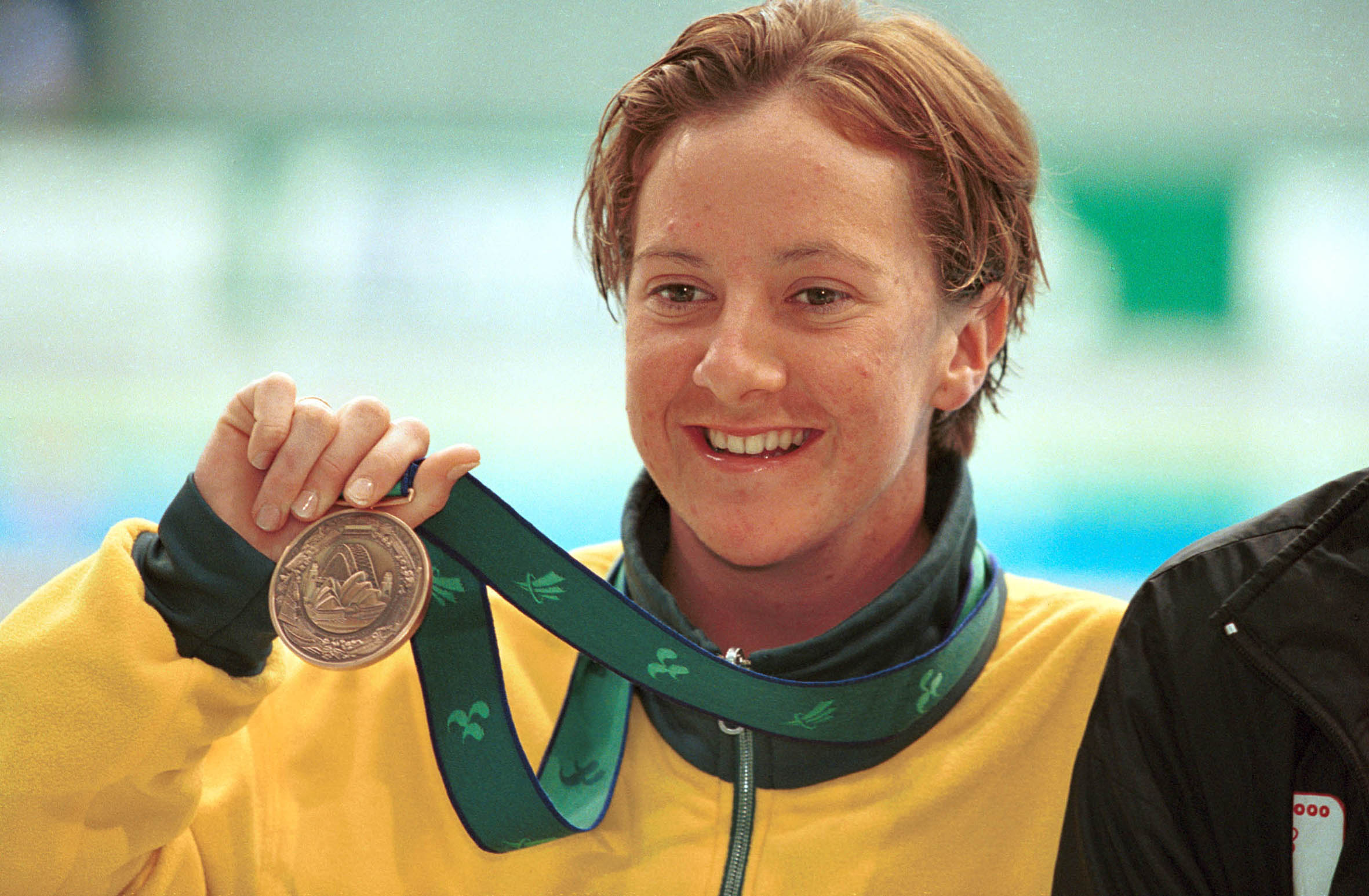
- Stockham with one of the three bronze medals she won at the 2000 Sydney Paralympic Games

Personal information
- Nationality: Australia
- Born: 20 April 1982 (age 44) Townsville
Medal record
Swimming
Paralympic Games
Bronze medal – third place	2000 Sydney	Women's 100 m Breaststroke SB8
Bronze medal – third place	2000 Sydney	Women's 200 m Medley SM8
Bronze medal – third place	2000 Sydney	Women's 4x100 m Medley 34 pts
Bronze medal – third place	2004 Athens	Women's 4x100 m Medley 34 pts
IPC Swimming World Championships
Silver medal – second place	1998 Christchurch	Women's 200 m Medley SM8
Bronze medal – third place	1998 Christchurch	Women's 100 m Butterfly S8

Brooke Stockham (born 20 April 1982) is an Australian Paralympic swimmer. She was born in Townsville. She won three bronze medals at the 2000 Sydney Games in the Women's 100 m Breaststroke SB8, Women's 200 m Medley SM8 and Women's 4x100 m Medley 34 pts events. At the 2004 Summer Paralympics she won another bronze medal in the Women's 4x100 m Medley 34 pts event.
