= Kelly Crowley =

American Paralympic swimmer and cyclist

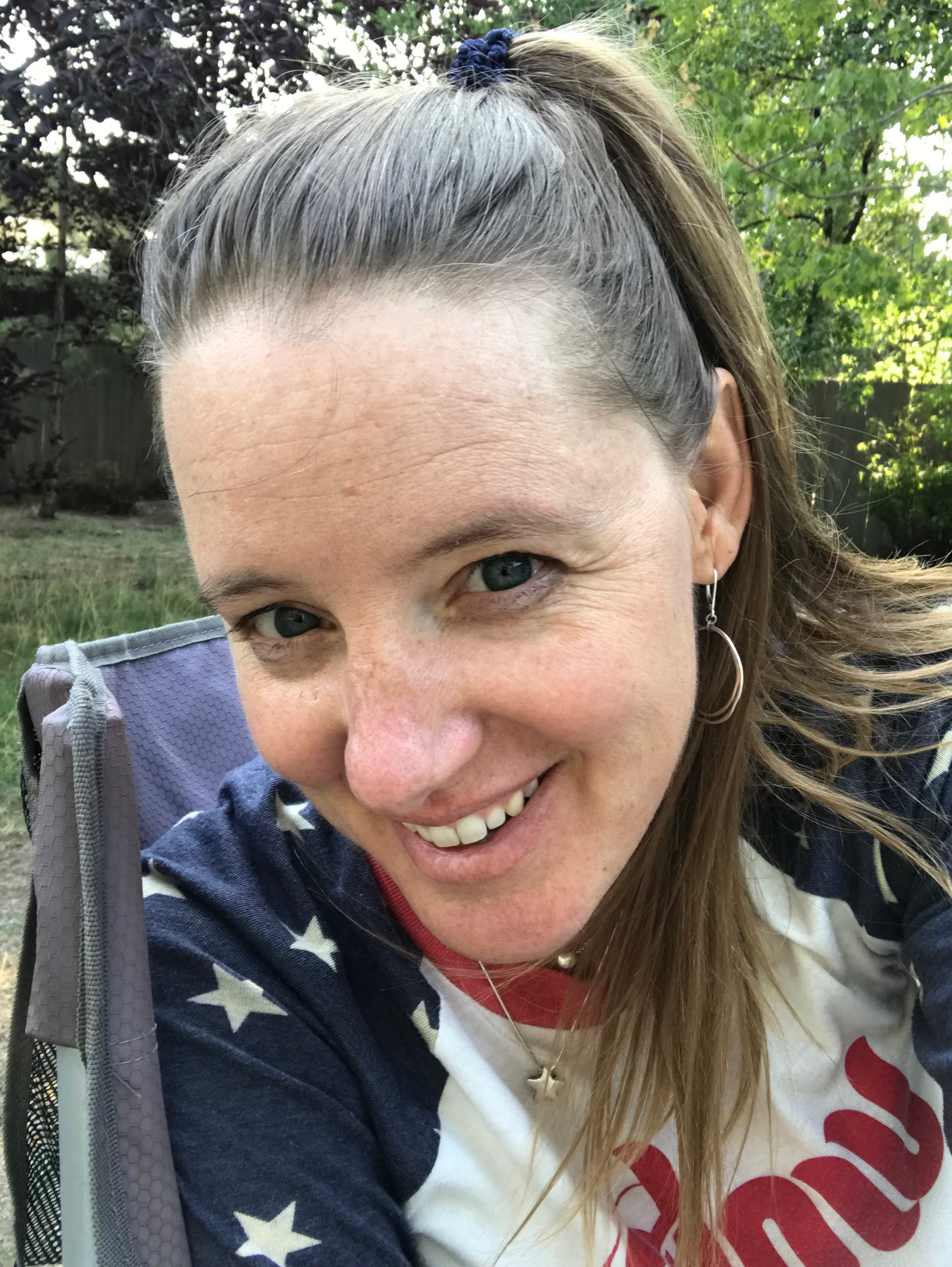
- Crowley in 2021

Personal information
- Nationality: United States
- Born: 1976 (age 49–50) Redwood, California, United States
- Education: Santa Clara University ('99)
Medal record
Athletics
Paralympic Games
| Gold medal – first place | 2004 Greece | Women's freestyle swimming |
| Gold medal – first place | 2004 Greece | Women's medley relays swimming |
| Silver medal – second place | 2011 UCI Para-cycling World Cup | Women's Cycling |
| Silver medal – second place | 2011 UCI Para-cycling World Cup | Women's Cycling |

Kelly Crowley (born 1976) is an American Paralympic swimmer and cyclist.

== Competition ==
Crowley is 17-time Disability Swimming National Champion. She is a two-time Paralympic swimming Gold medalist which she earned for the participation in 2004 Summer Paralympics in Athens, Greece. Later on in 2006 she joined cycling and by 2007 won Bronze medal for Para Cycling. The same year she became a champion in the Time Trial World Championship. Three years later she received another bronze medal this time for Individual Road Race in Quebec, Canada. In 2012 she was awarded bronze one more time for the same participation as previous years. The same year she got 2nd two times in UCI Para-cycling World Cup in Rome, Italy.

== Personal life ==
Crowley was born with a right arm that had no elbow and only three fingers. She was raised in Menlo Park, California. In 1999 she graduated from Santa Clara University.

Currently she is a coach for USA Swimming and is also a founder of the Victory Sport Project. She has also served as a Motivational speaker for such corporations as Levi Strauss and The Hartford, with her speeches often promoting disability-awareness and mental and physical health.

In 2017 Kelly Crowley and Katie Holloway launched a podcast called Inside Para Sport and featured Muffy Davis as a guest speaker on one of the 5 episodes.
