= Beth Riggle =

American Paralympic swimmer

Personal information
- Nationality: United States

Sport
- Sport: Swimming
- Strokes: Breaststroke
Medal record
Athletics
Paralympic Games
Gold medal – first place	2004 Athens	4x100m medley relay 34pts
Bronze medal – third place	2004 Athens	100m breaststroke SB8

Beth Riggle is an American Paralympic swimmer and physician.

== Biography ==
Riggle participated in the 2004 Summer Paralympics in Athens, Greece where she won one gold and one bronze medal for her competition in 4x100 34 pt medley relay and 100m breaststroke swimming.

After graduating Valedictorian from her high school, Riggle retired from swimming in 2005 to pursue other passions. She earned a B.S. with a double major in Microbiology and Genetics and completed her first year of a PharmD before deciding to attend medical school instead. While in medical school, she dabbled in triathlon before injuries forced another retirement.

Riggle earned her MD in 2014 and subsequently completed a residency in Triple Board (Pediatrics, General Psychiatry, and Child/Adolescent Psychiatry). She is currently Board Certified in all three specialties with expertise in childhood trauma and systems based care.

Riggle is married with one child.
