= Swimming at the 2008 Summer Paralympics – Men's 100 metre breaststroke SB5 =

Men's 100m Breaststroke SB5 at the XIII Paralympic Games
- Venue: Beijing National Aquatics Center
- Dates: 12 September
- Competitors: 12 from 11 nations
- Winning time: 1:34.69

Medalists
| 1st place, gold medalist(s) | | Pedro Rangel | Mexico |
| 2nd place, silver medalist(s) | | Thomas Grimm | Germany |
| 3rd place, bronze medalist(s) | | Tadhg Slattery | South Africa |

The men's 100m breaststroke SB5 event at the 2008 Summer Paralympics took place at the Beijing National Aquatics Center on 12 September. There were two heats; the swimmers with the eight fastest times advanced to the final.

== Results ==
=== Heats ===
Competed from 10:18.

==== Heat 1 ====
| Rank | Name | Nationality | Time | Notes |
|---|---|---|---|---|
| 1 | Tadhg Slattery | South Africa | 1:37.44 | Q |
| 2 | Anders Olsson | Sweden | 1:43.92 | Q |
| 3 | Aaron Paulson | United States | 1:44.68 | Q |
| 4 | Efrem Morelli | Italy | 1:47.88 | |
| 5 | Taweesook Samuksaneeto | Thailand | 1:51.18 | |
| 6 | Win San Aung | Myanmar | 1:54.51 | |

==== Heat 2 ====
| Rank | Name | Nationality | Time | Notes |
|---|---|---|---|---|
| 1 | Pedro Rangel | Mexico | 1:33.95 | Q |
| 2 | Niels Grunenberg | Germany | 1:34.83 | Q |
| 3 | Thomas Grimm | Germany | 1:38.15 | Q |
| 4 | Lim Woo Geun | South Korea | 1:40.51 | Q |
| 5 | Lioz Amar | Israel | 1:42.11 | Q |
| 6 | Adriano Lima | Brazil | 1:47.10 | |

=== Final ===
Competed at 18:42.

| Rank | Name | Nationality | Time | Notes |
|---|---|---|---|---|
| 1st place, gold medalist(s) | Pedro Rangel | Mexico | 1:34.69 | |
| 2nd place, silver medalist(s) | Thomas Grimm | Germany | 1:35.41 | |
| 3rd place, bronze medalist(s) | Tadhg Slattery | South Africa | 1:36.11 | |
| 4 | Niels Grunenberg | Germany | 1:36.68 | |
| 5 | Lim Woo Geun | South Korea | 1:38.98 | |
| 6 | Anders Olsson | Sweden | 1:40.47 | |
| 7 | Aaron Paulson | United States | 1:42.43 | |
| 8 | Lioz Amar | Israel | 1:42.50 | |

Q = qualified for final.
