= Swimming at the 2012 Summer Paralympics – Men's 100 metre breaststroke SB5 =

Event at the 2012 Summer Paralympics

Men's 100m Breaststroke SB5 at the XIV Paralympic Games
- Venue: London Aquatics Centre
- Dates: 5 September 2012
- Competitors: 11 from 10 nations
- Winning time: 1:34.06

Medalists
1st place, gold medalist(s)		Lim Woo-geun	South Korea
2nd place, silver medalist(s)		Niels Grunenberg	Germany
3rd place, bronze medalist(s)		Pedro Rangel	Mexico

The men's 100m breaststroke SB5 event at the 2012 Summer Paralympics took place at the London Aquatics Centre on 5 September. There were two heats; the swimmers with the eight fastest times advanced to the final.

== Results ==
=== Heats ===
Competed from 10:26.

==== Heat 1 ====
Rank	Lane	Name	Nationality	Time	Notes
1	3	Lim Woo-geun	South Korea	1:34.94	Q, AS
2	5	James O'Shea	Great Britain	1:39.88	Q
3	4	Anders Olsson	Sweden	1:41.08	Q
4	6	Alejandro Silva	Mexico	1:50.13	
5	2	Taweesook Samuksaneeto	Thailand	1:55.80	

==== Heat 2 ====
Rank	Lane	Name	Nationality	Time	Notes
1	5	Niels Grunenberg	Germany	1:36.97	Q
2	4	Pedro Rangel	Mexico	1:37.97	Q
3	3	Tadhg Slattery	South Africa	1:39.55	Q
4	6	Adriano de Lima	Brazil	1:43.29	Q
5	2	Scott Patterson	Canada	1:49.89	Q
	7	Jawad Kadhim Joudah Joudah	Iraq	DSQ	

=== Final ===
Competed at 18:23.

Rank	Lane	Name	Nationality	Time	Notes
1st place, gold medalist(s)	4	Lim Woo-geun	South Korea	1:34.06	AS
2nd place, silver medalist(s)	5	Niels Grunenberg	Germany	1:34.98	
3rd place, bronze medalist(s)	3	Pedro Rangel	Mexico	1:36.85	
4	2	James O'Shea	Great Britain	1:38.30	
5	6	Tadhg Slattery	South Africa	1:39.16	
6	7	Anders Olsson	Sweden	1:41.59	
7	1	Adriano de Lima	Brazil	1:43.88	
8	8	Scott Patterson	Canada	1:50.21	

'Q = qualified for final. AS = Asian Record. DSQ = Disqualified.
