= Hangzhou Olympic Expo Center =

Multipurpose sports complex in Hangzhou, China

Coordinates: 30°13′54″N 120°13′27″E

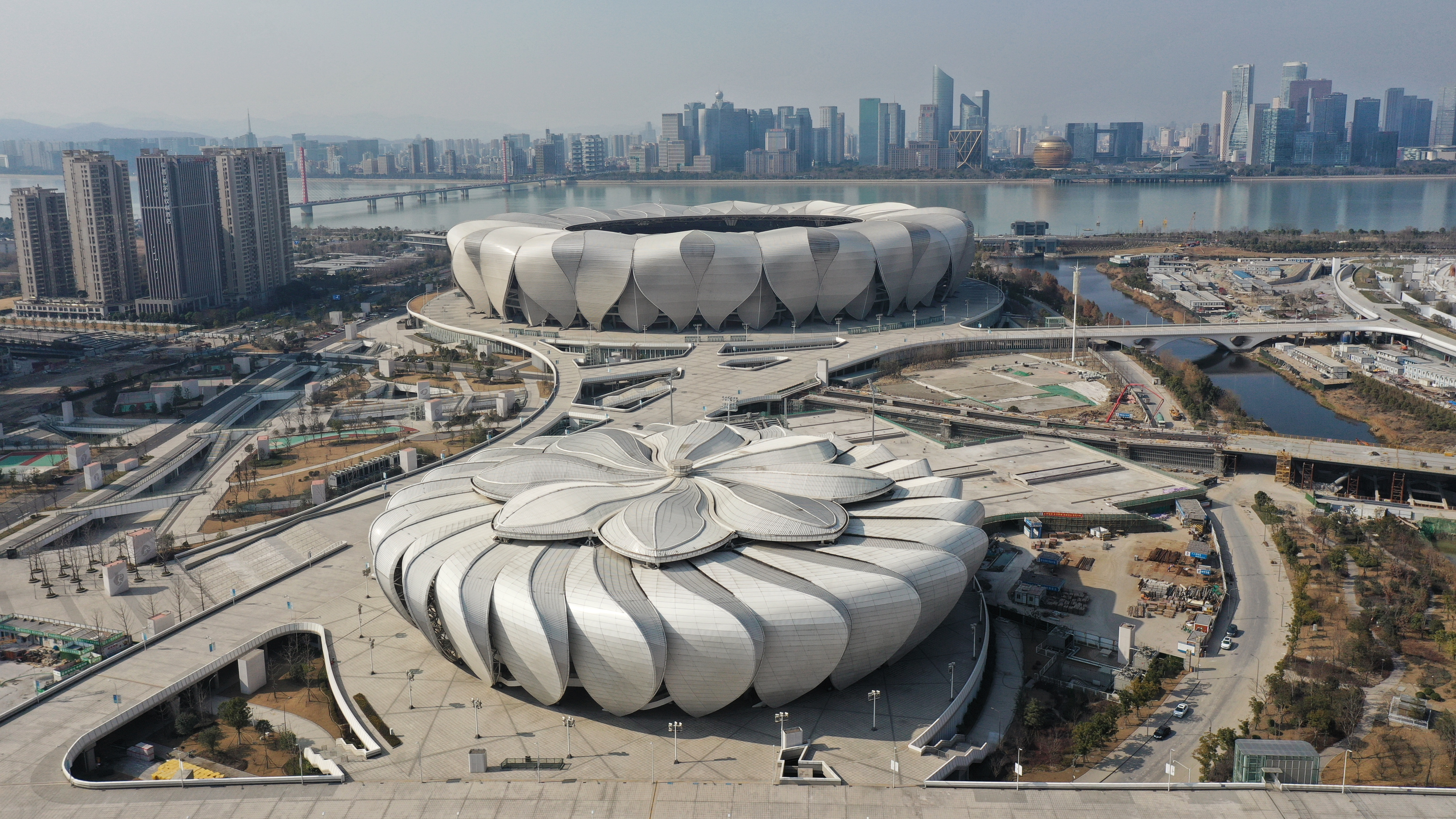
- Aerial view of the Hangzhou Olympic Expo Center in 2021
- Interactive map of Hangzhou Olympic Expo Center
- Address: No. 3 Feihong Rd, Xixing Subdistrict, Binjiang District
- Location: Hangzhou, Zhejiang Province, China
- Capacity: 80,000-seat main stadium, 10,000-seat tennis center for final field, 2*2,000-seat tennis center for semifinal field, 6,000-seat swimming center.
- Surface: Grass
- Public transit: 6 7 Olympic Sports Center; 6 Expo Center

Construction
- Groundbreaking: December 2009
- Opened: December 2018
- Cost: CN¥5.8 billion
- Architects: NBBJ and CCDI

The Hangzhou Olympic Expo Center (Chinese: 杭州奥体博览城) or Hangzhou Olympic Sports Center (Chinese: 杭州奥林匹克体育中心) is a multi-purpose sports complex in Hangzhou, Zhejiang Province, China.

It was completed in 2018, and it is used mostly for football matches. The main stadium was designed with a capacity of 80,000 spectators.

The stadium was built by NBBJ in partnership with CCDI. The stadium is built on a 60,000 square meters (650,000 sq ft) site on the Qiantang riverfront, opposite Hangzhou's Qianjiang New City Central Business District. Hangzhou hosted the 2022 Asian Games, with the men's football final and the 2022 Asian Para Games in September–October 2023.

== Main stadium ==
Hangzhou Olympic Sports Center Stadium
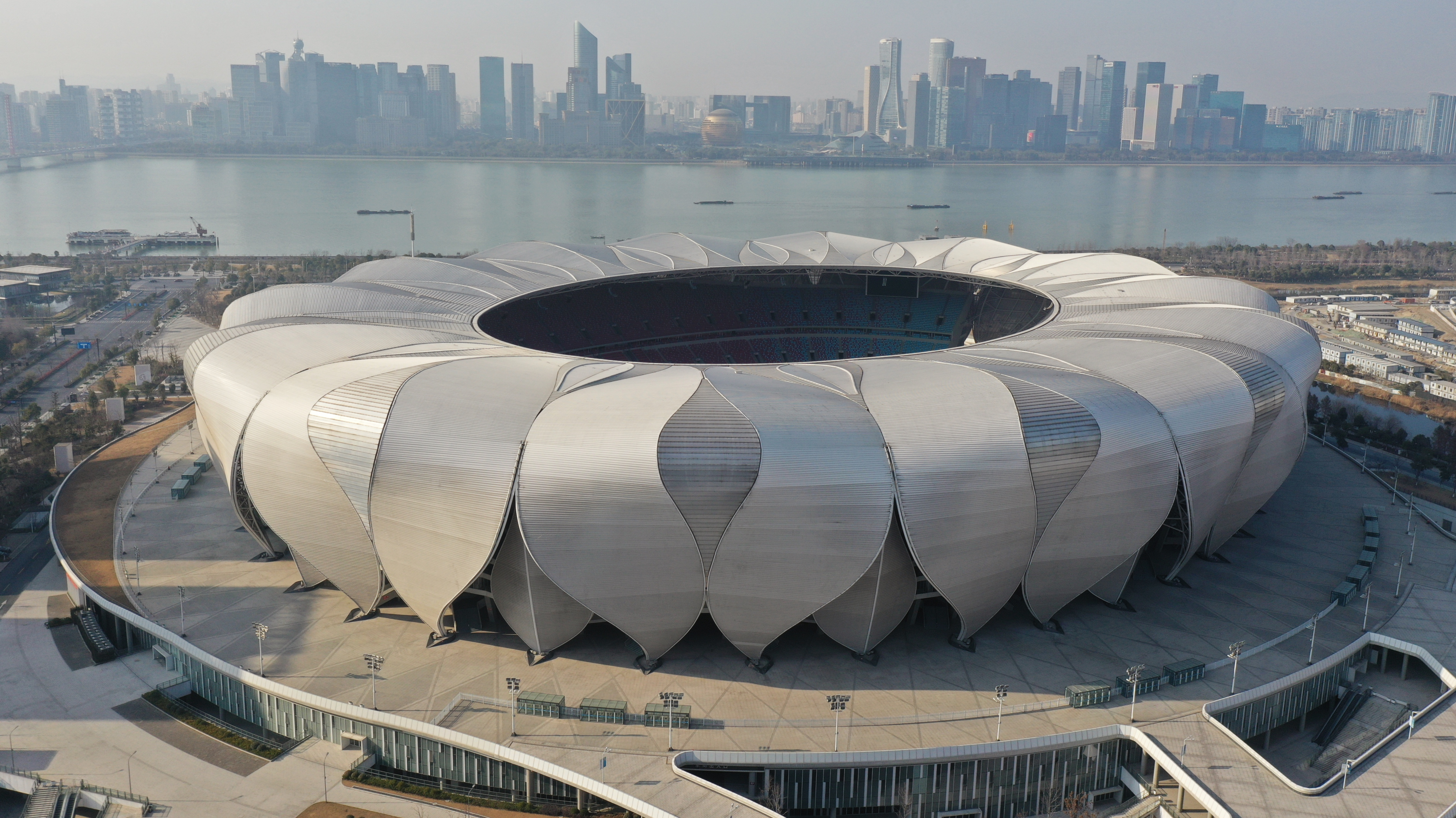
- Interactive map of Hangzhou Olympic Sports Center Stadium
- Location: Hangzhou, Zhejiang Province, China
- Capacity: 80,000
- Surface: Grass
- Public transit: 6 7 Olympic Sports Center; 6 Expo Center

Construction
- Groundbreaking: December 2009
- Opened: December 2018
- Architects: NBBJ and CCDI

It was completed in 2018, and it is used mostly for football matches. The stadium was designed with a capacity of 80,000 spectators.

== Construction ==
The construction area is 229,000 square meters (including 61,000 square meters of underground construction area). There are 80,800 seats divided into three levels: upper, middle, and lower. The stands are disconnected on the north side to facilitate heat dissipation in the venue and allow spectators to enjoy the scenery of the Qiantang River. The exterior design concept draws on the concepts of silk texture and dynamic Qiantang River water. The exterior is a steel structure with 28 large petals and 27 small petals. On November 28, 2013, the steel structure was officially closed.

The first floor and the underground floor are equipped with sports competition rooms, Hangzhou Intangible Cultural Heritage Protection Center, Hangzhou Mass Cultural Activity Center and the new Chinese Print Museum. There is a circular platform on the second floor, which is connected to the second-floor platform of the tennis center. International track and field and football competitions can be held. The stadium is open to the public free of charge at other times.

== Concerts ==
On August 11, 2019, Wang Leehom performed here as part of the "Descendants of the Dragon 2060" tour.

On December 31, 2021, Zhejiang Satellite TV sang Me to You at the 2022 New Year's Eve Party.

On April 28, 2023, Jeff Chang performed here during his "Future Style 2.0" concert at Hangzhou.

On April 6–7, 2024, Joker Xue performed 2 shows as part of his Extraterrestrial World Tour.

Katy Perry performed two shows on November 21 and 22, 2025, as part of her The Lifetimes Tour.

== Gallery ==
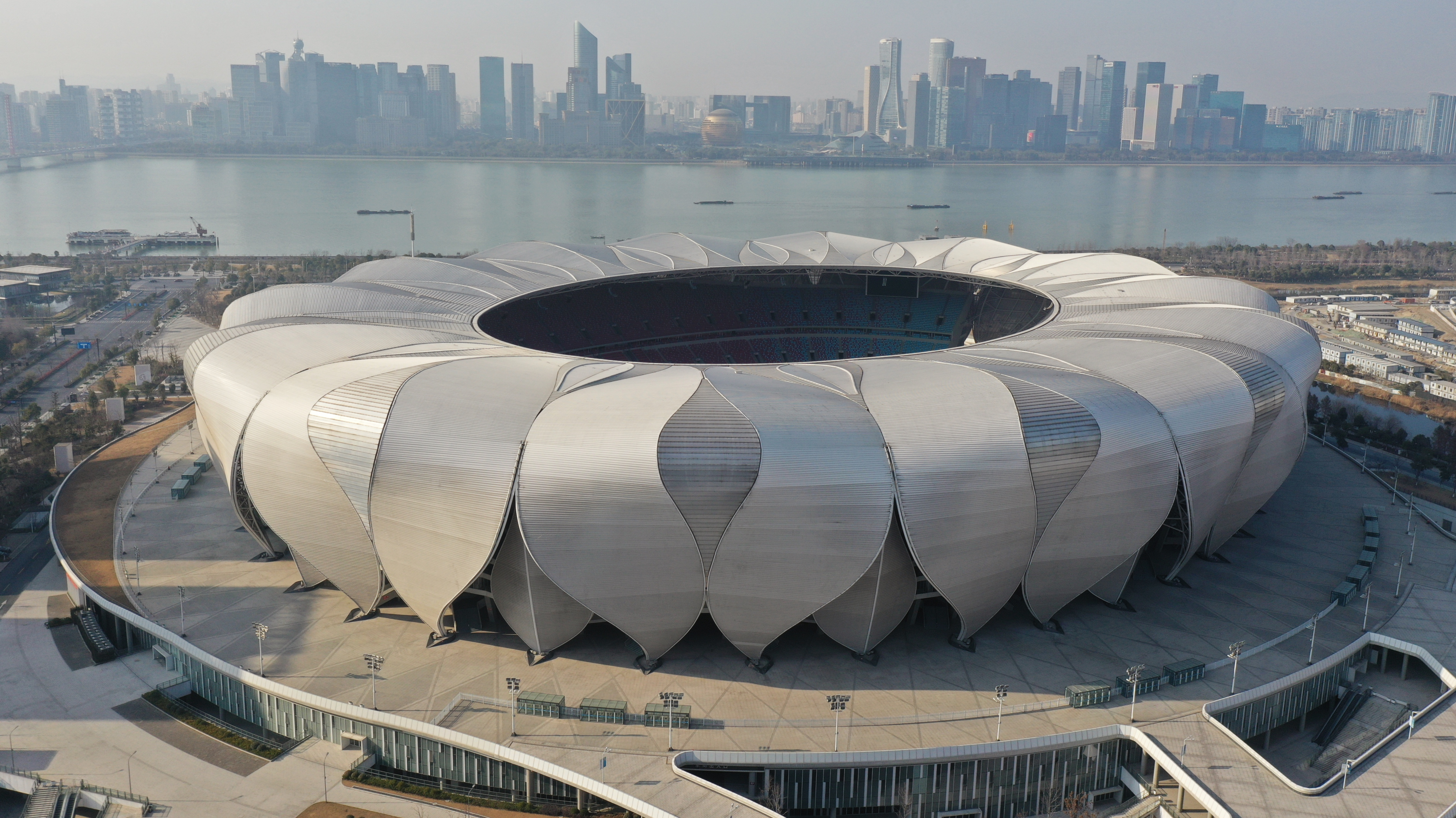
Main Stadium

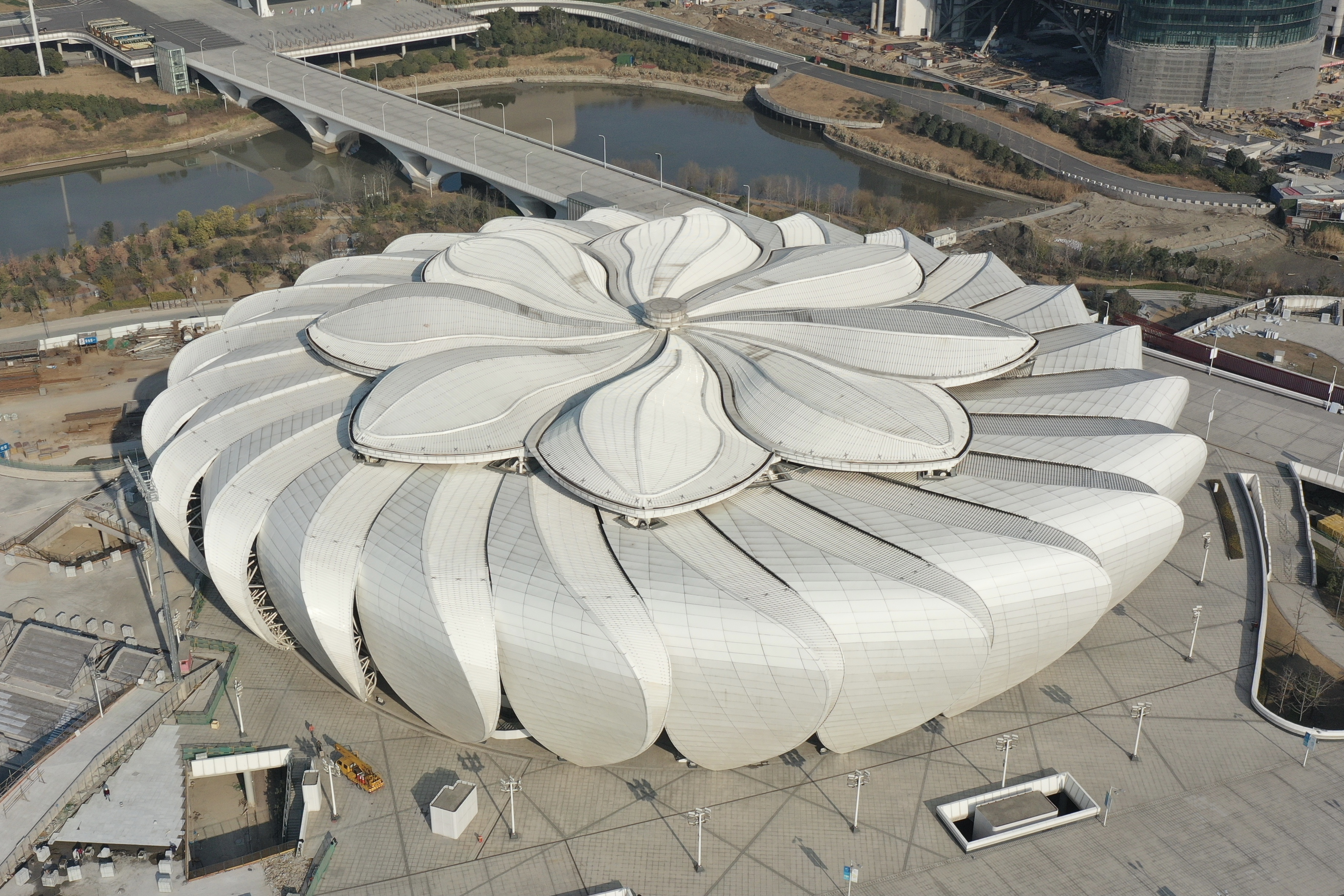
Tennis Center

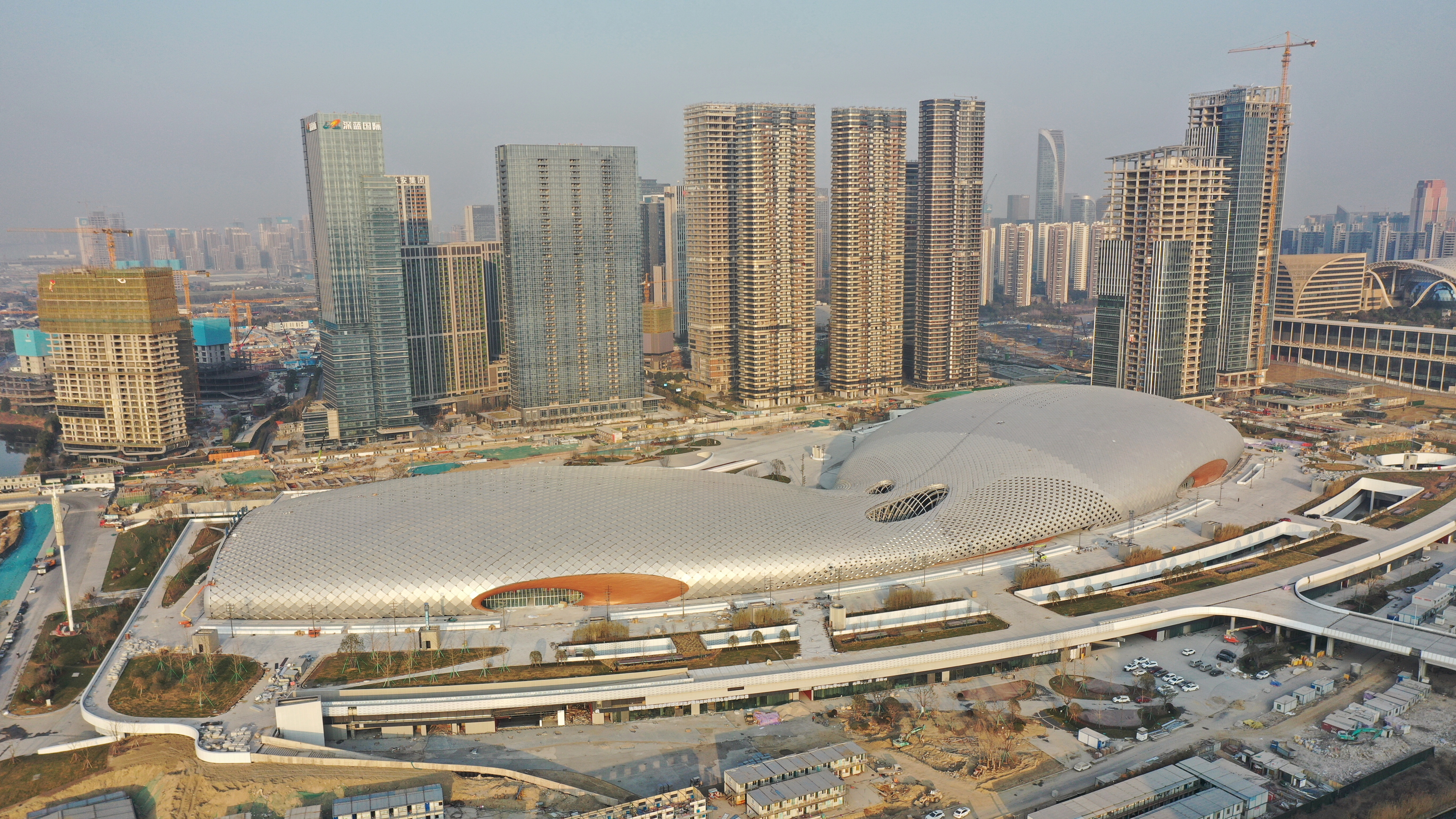
Gymnasium & Natatorium

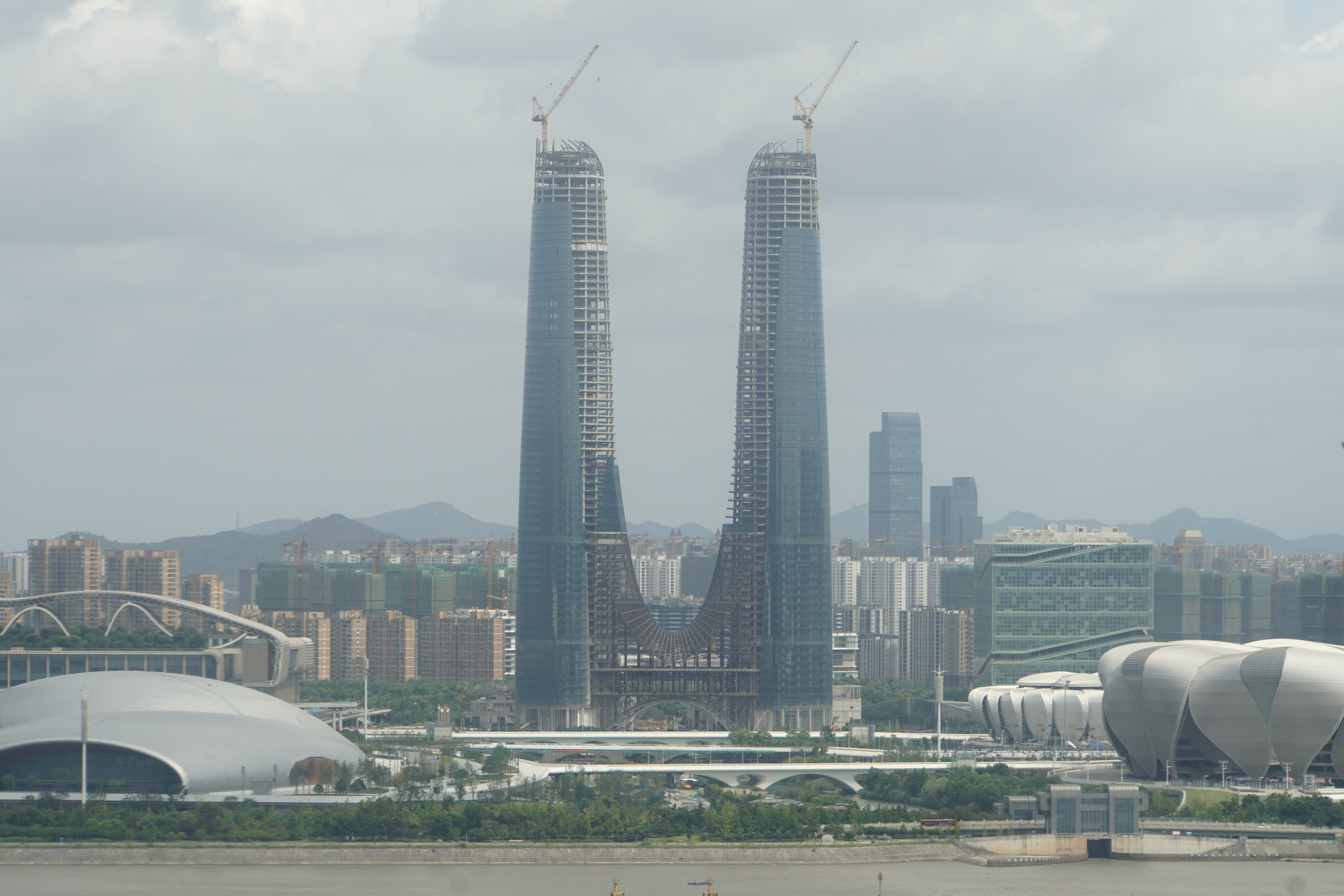
Greenland Hangzhou Center

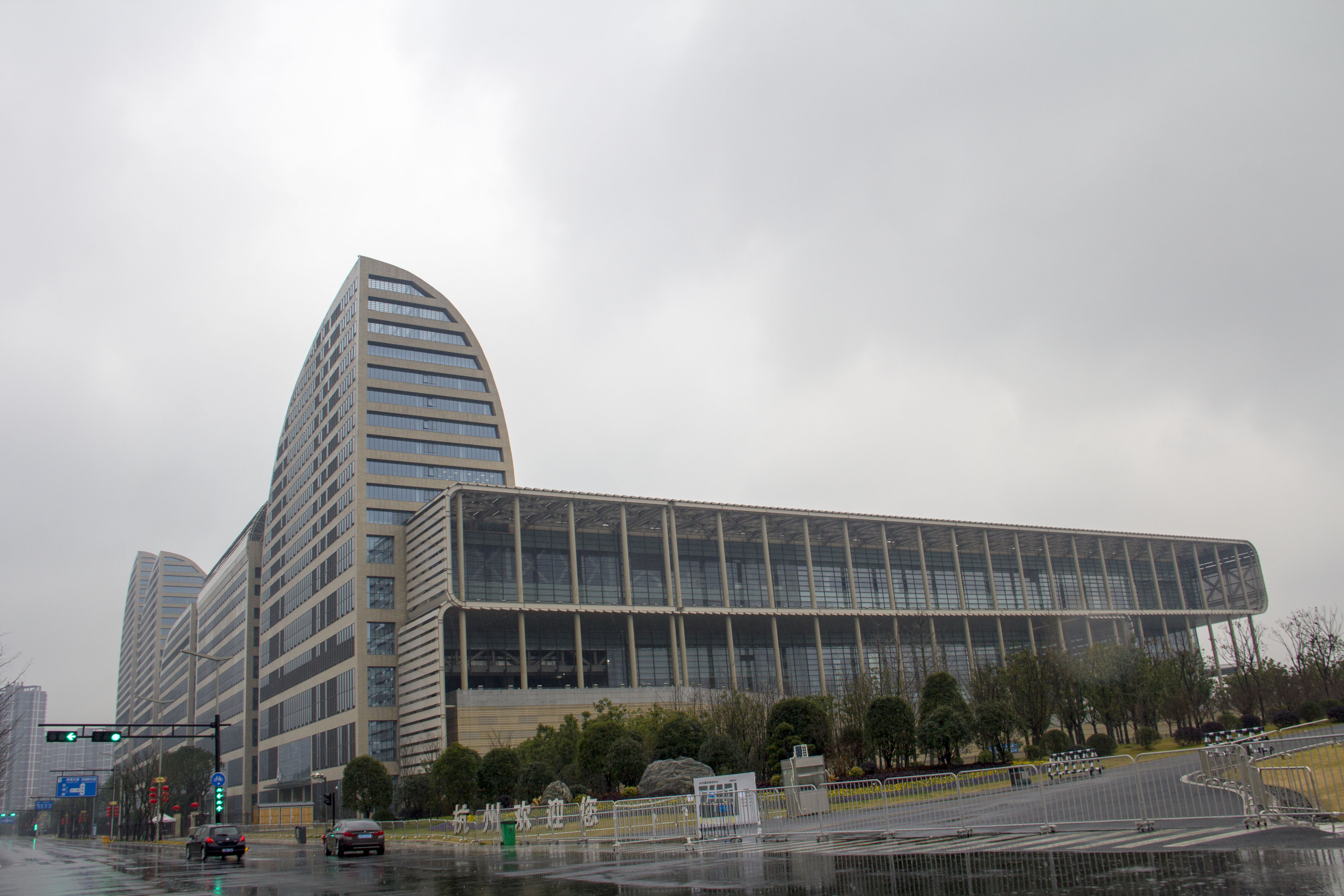
Hangzhou International Expo Center, the place where G20 summit held in 2016

== Gallery ==
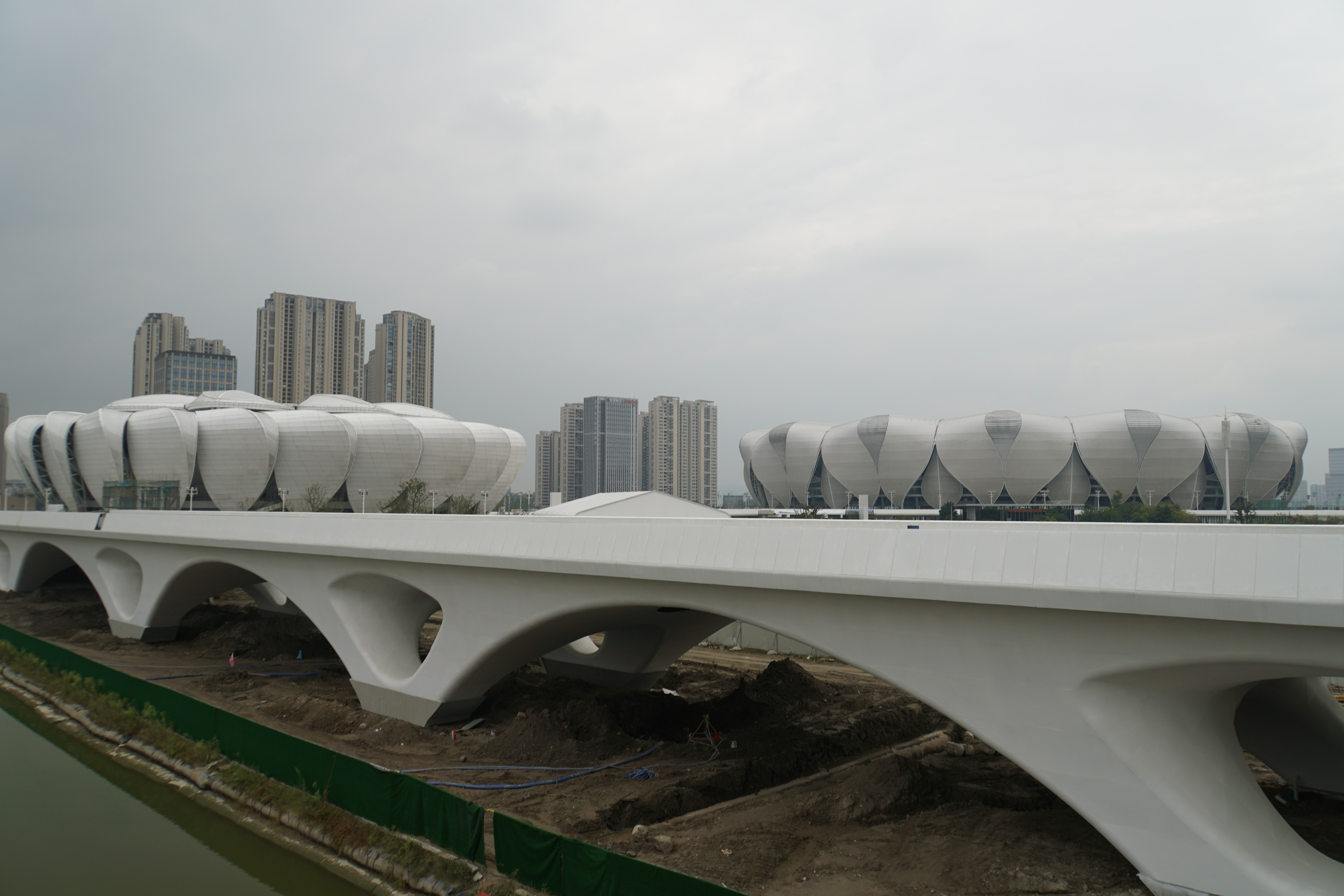

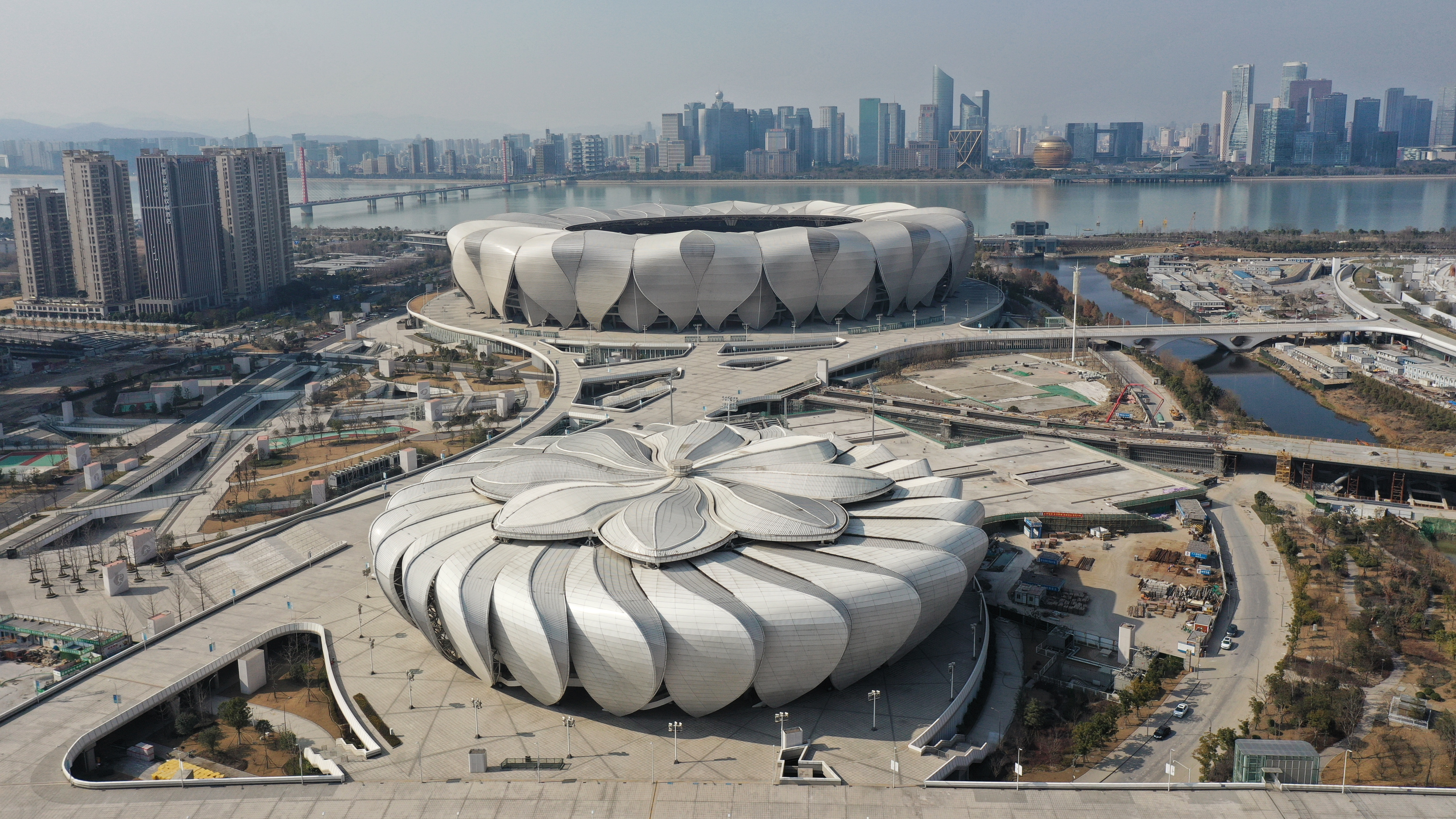

== Gallery ==
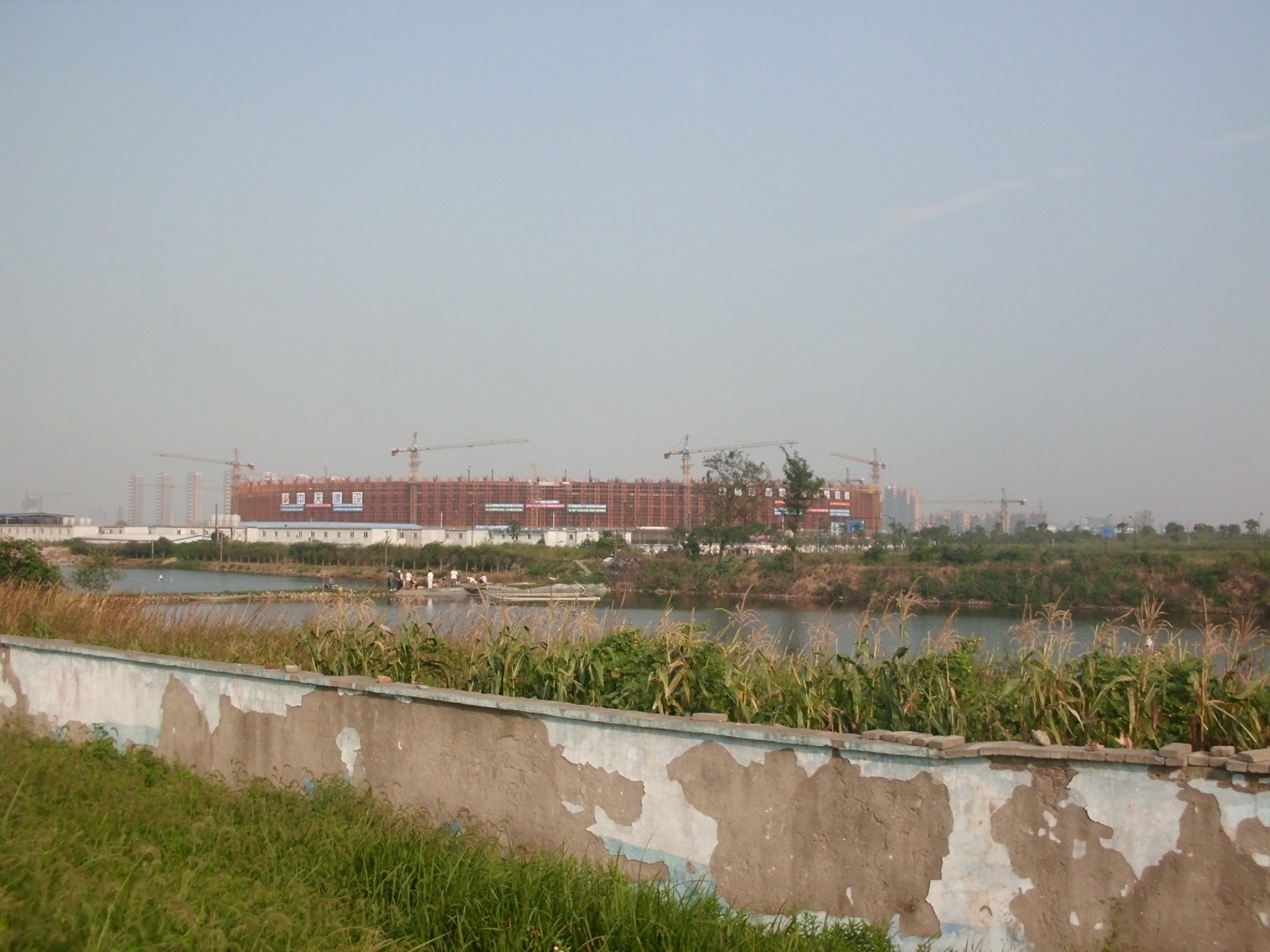

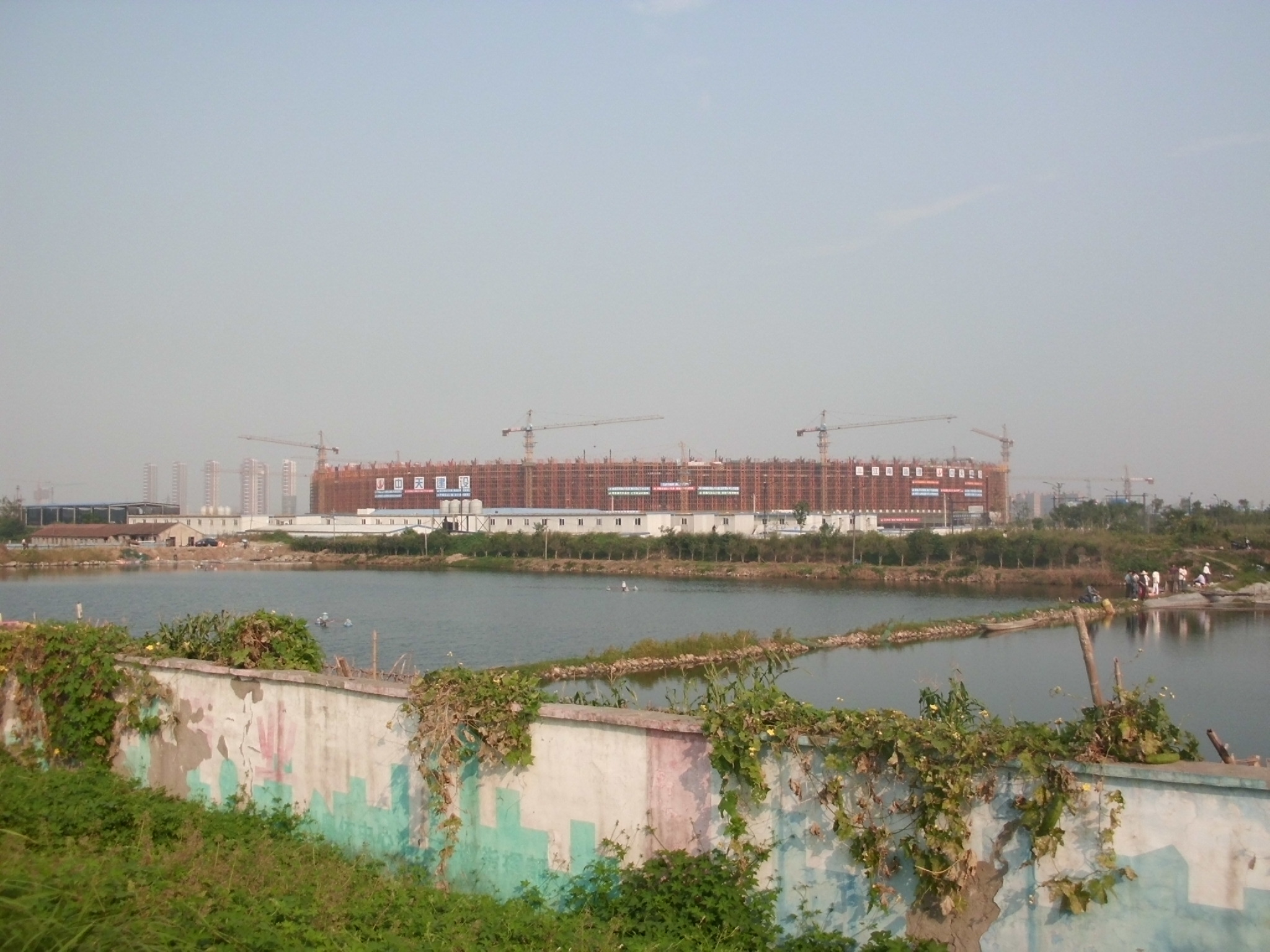

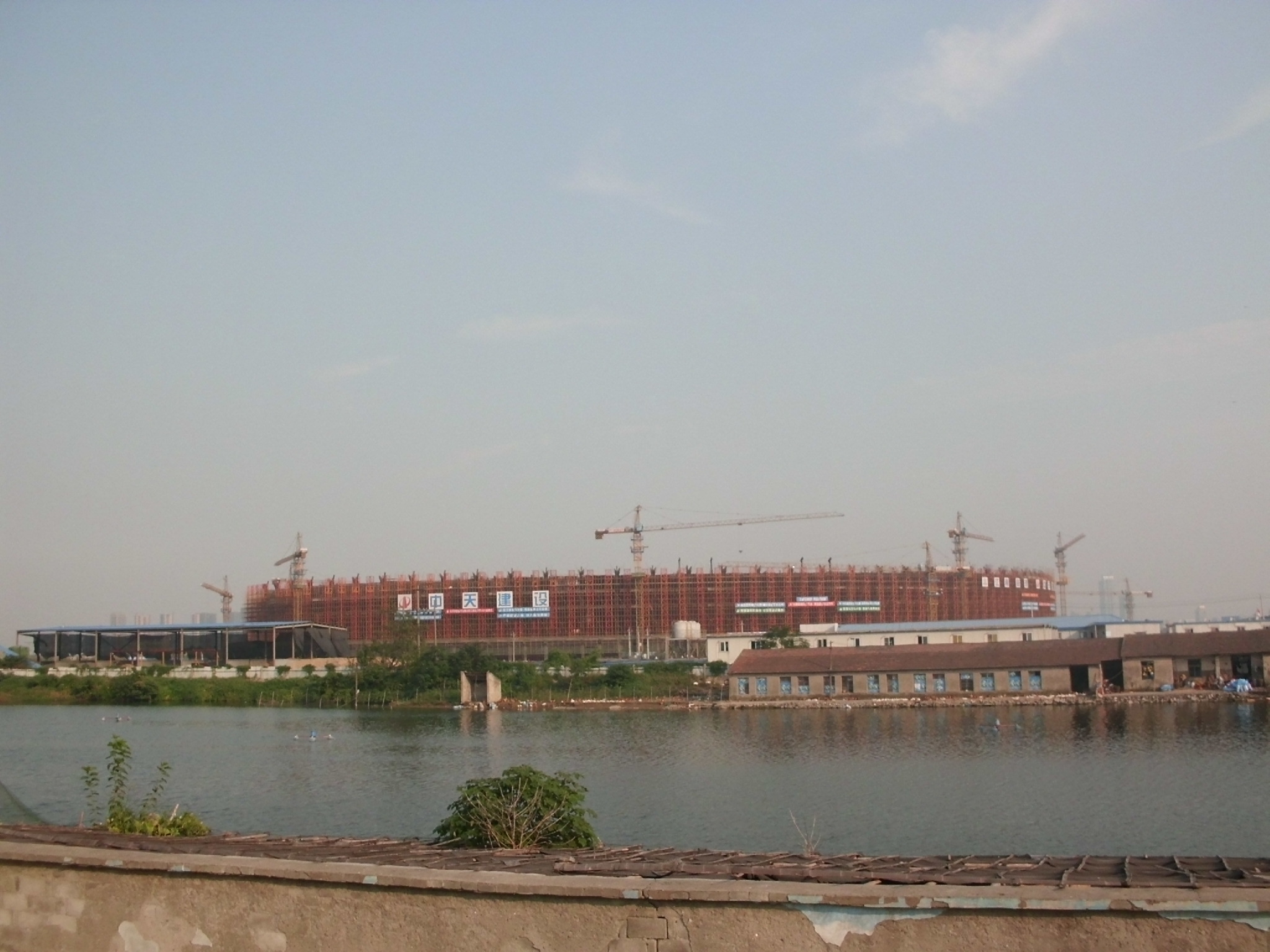

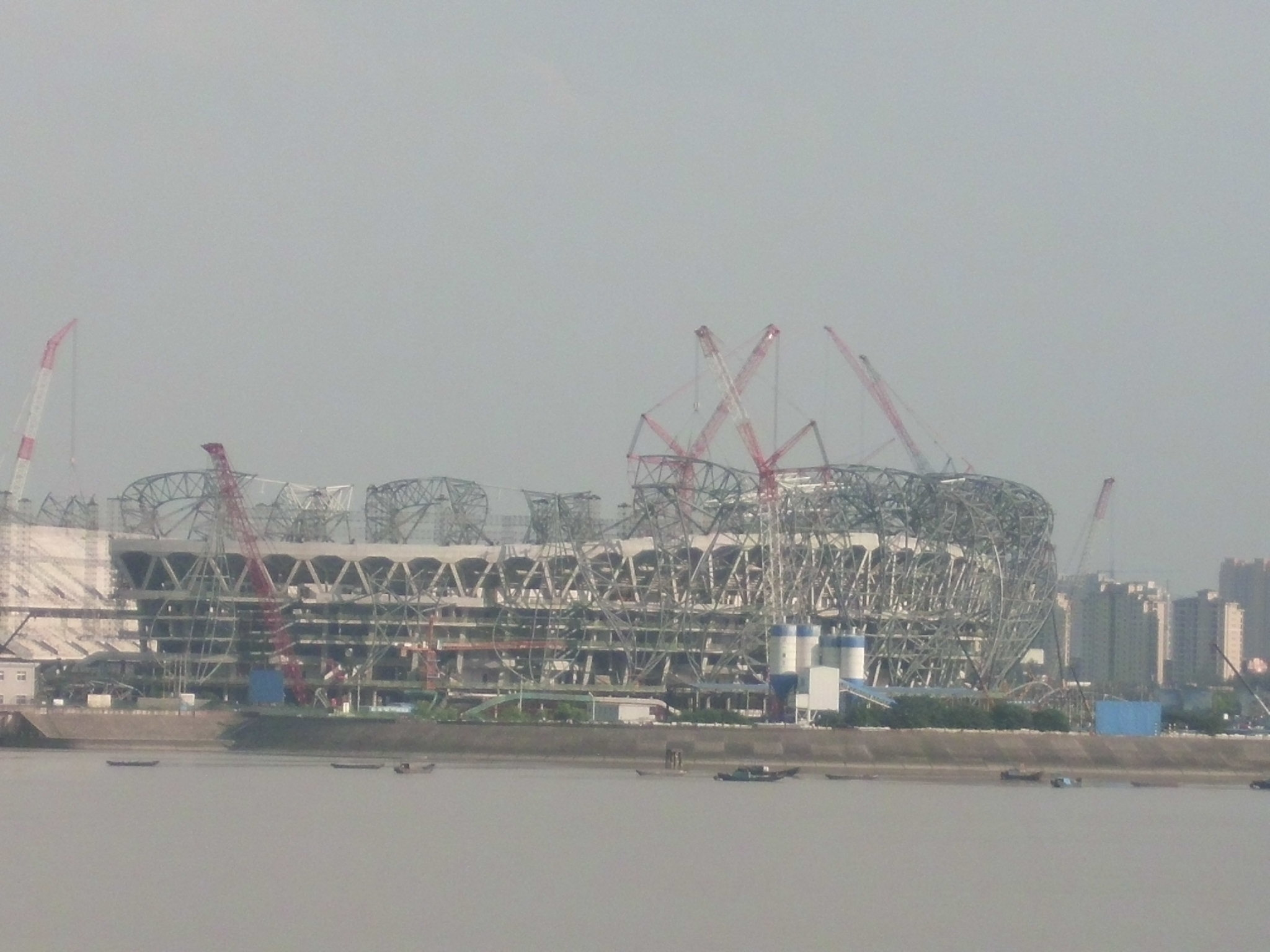

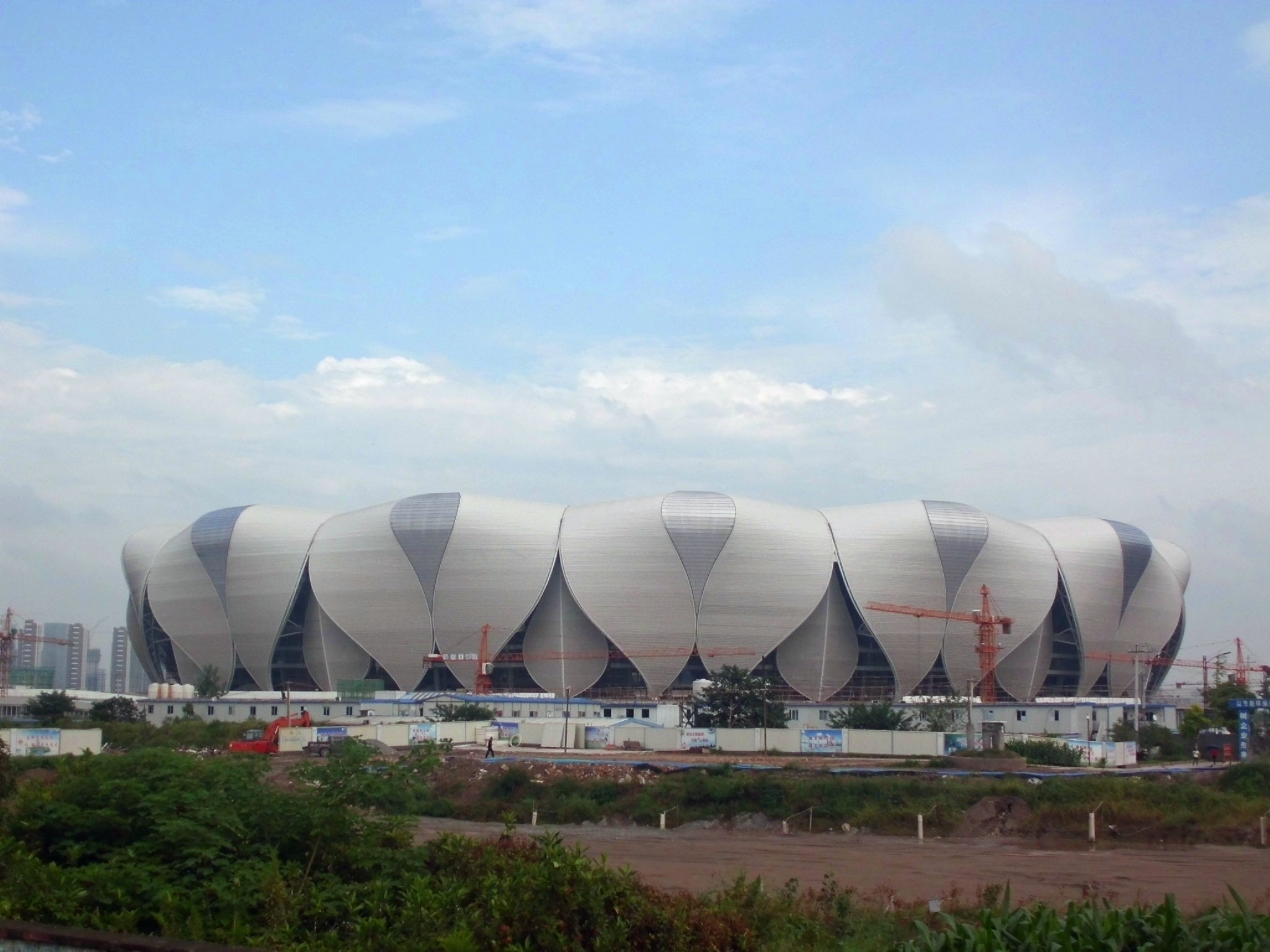

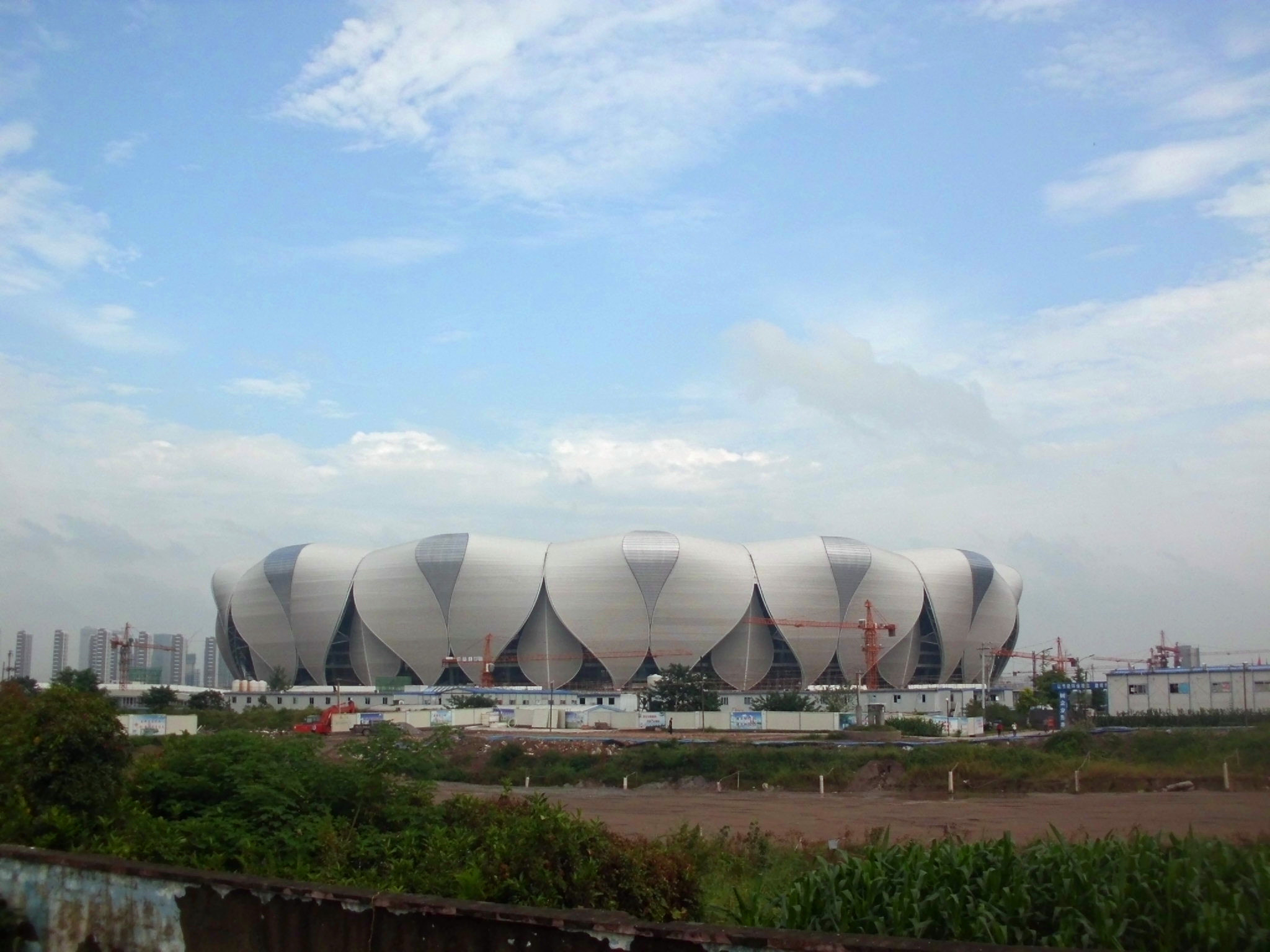

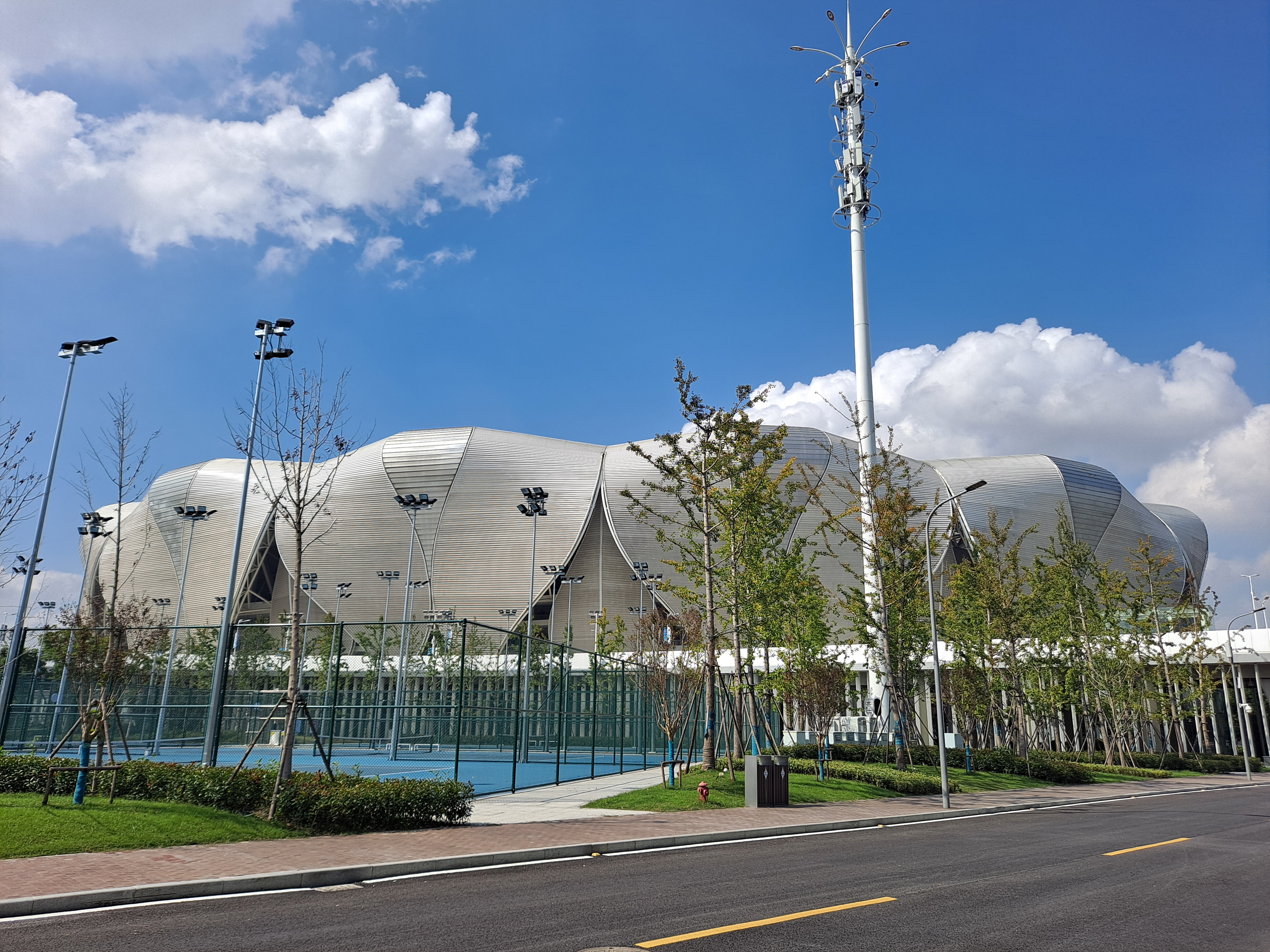

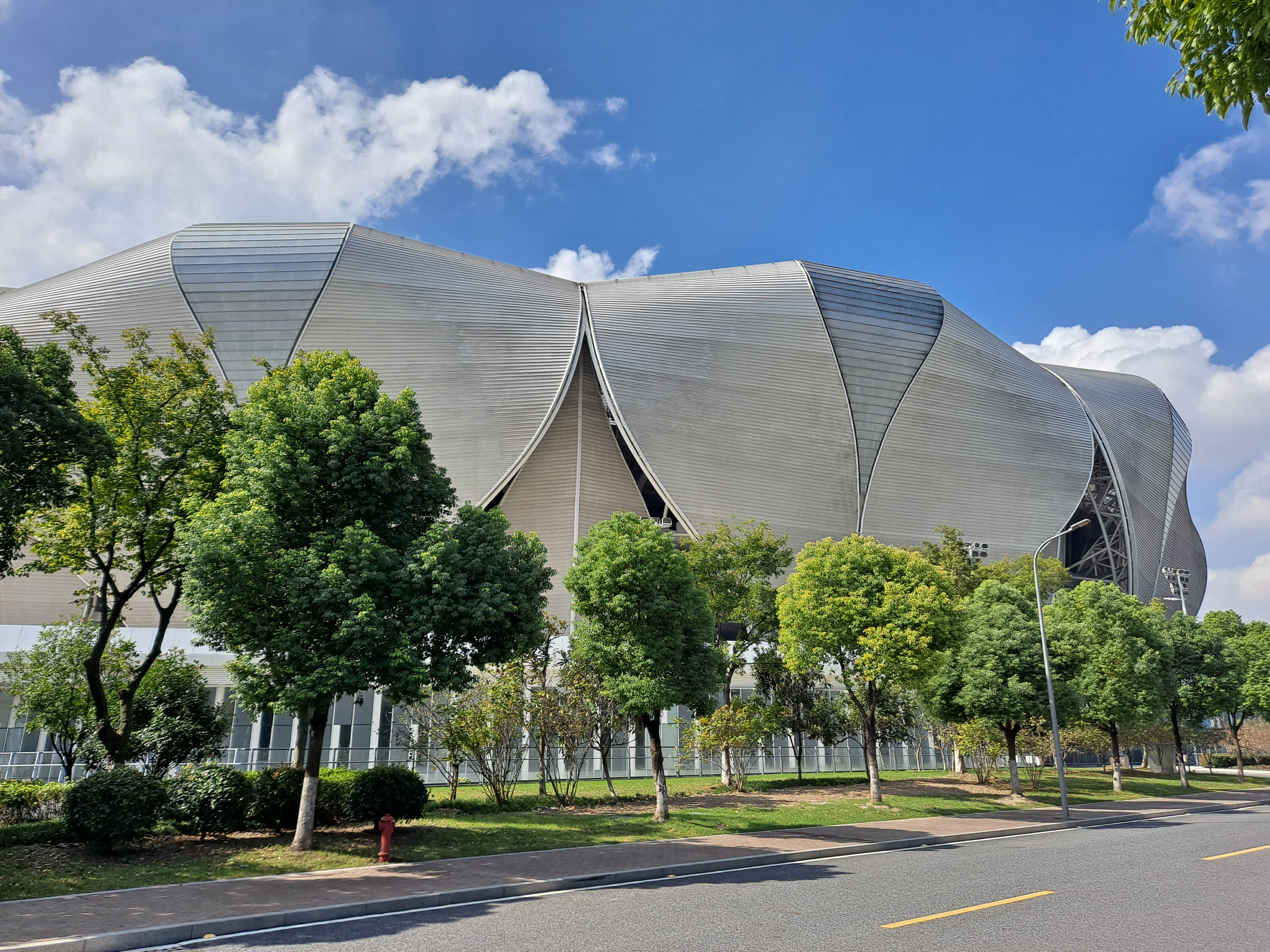

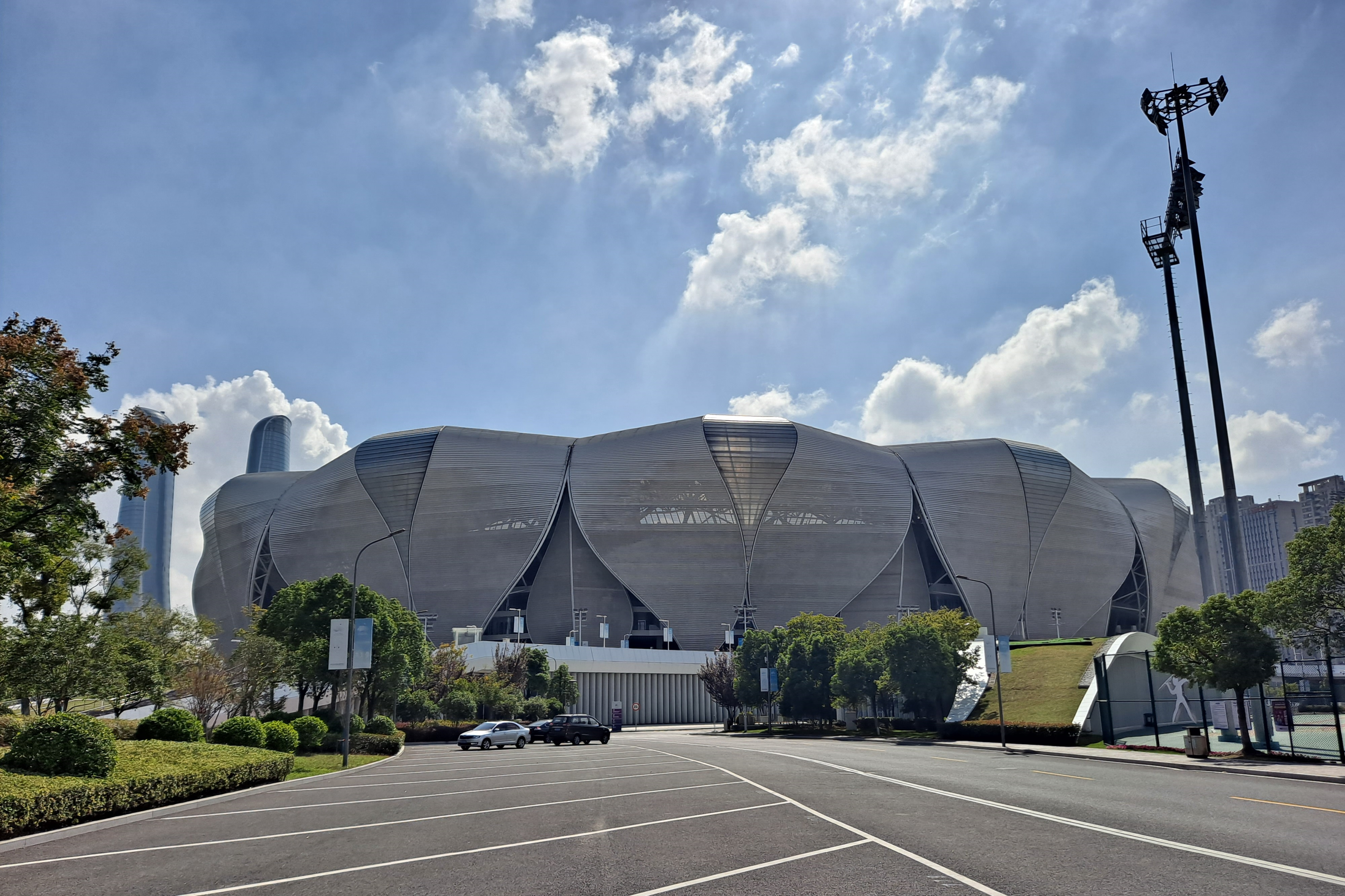

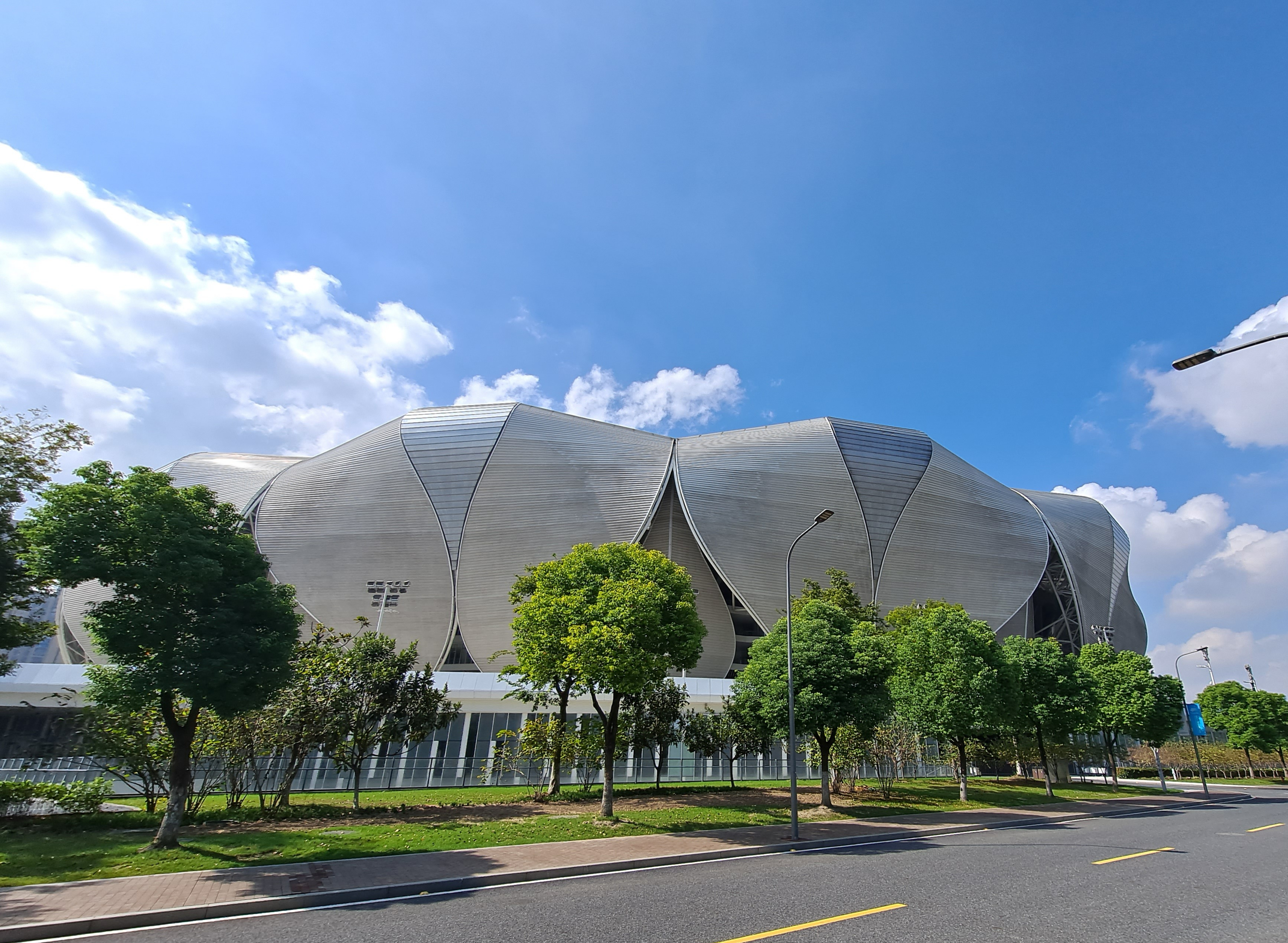

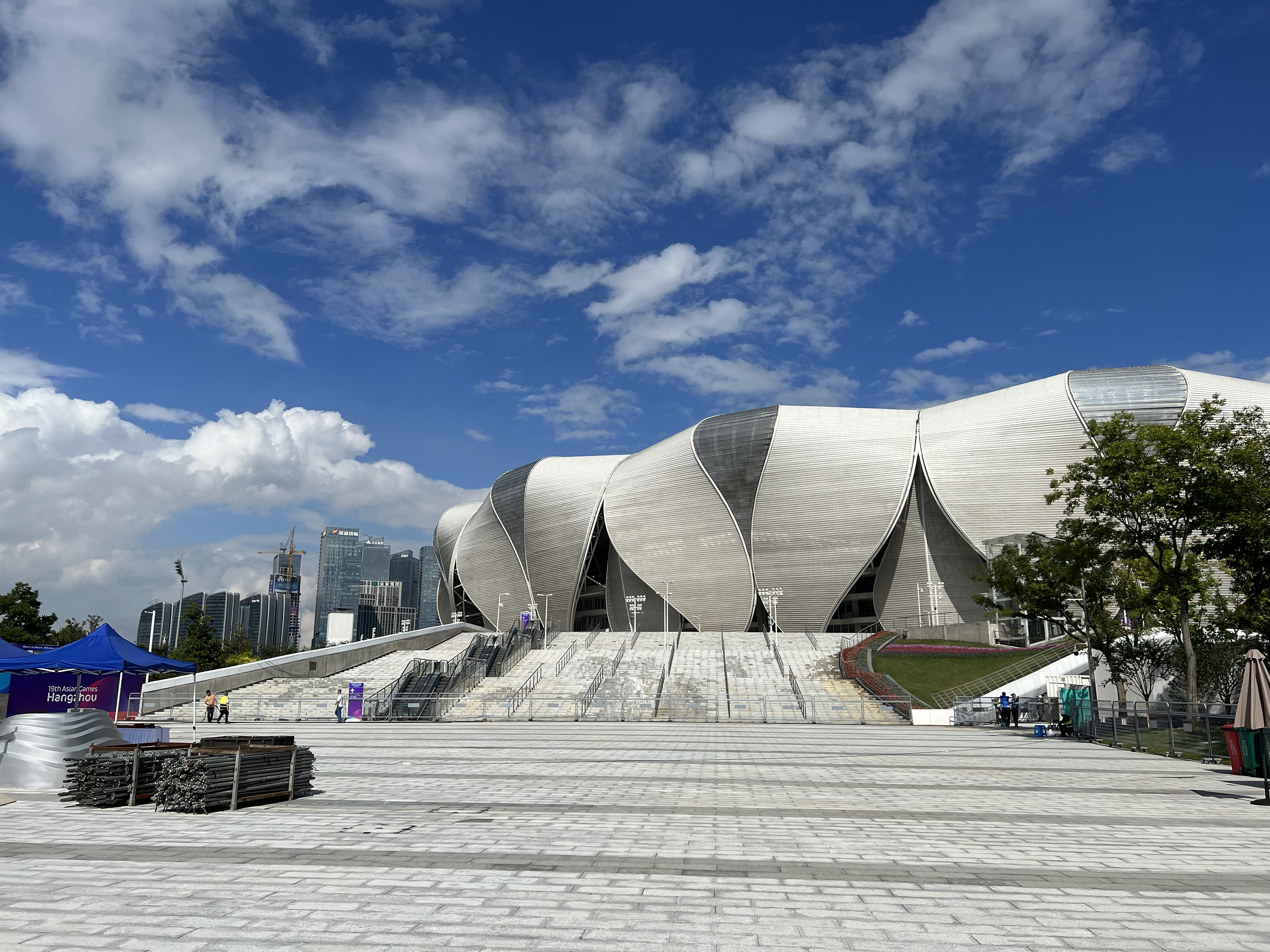

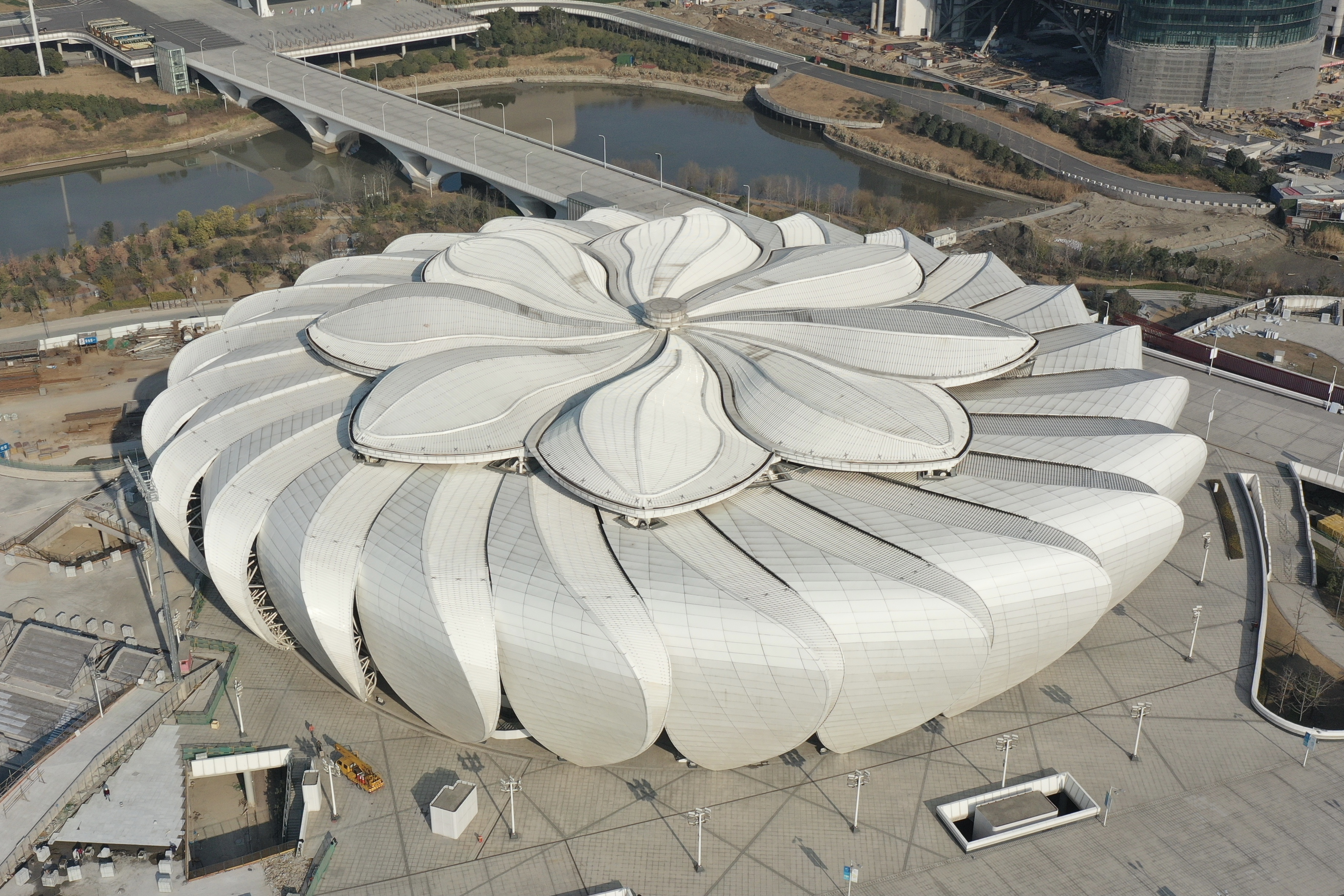

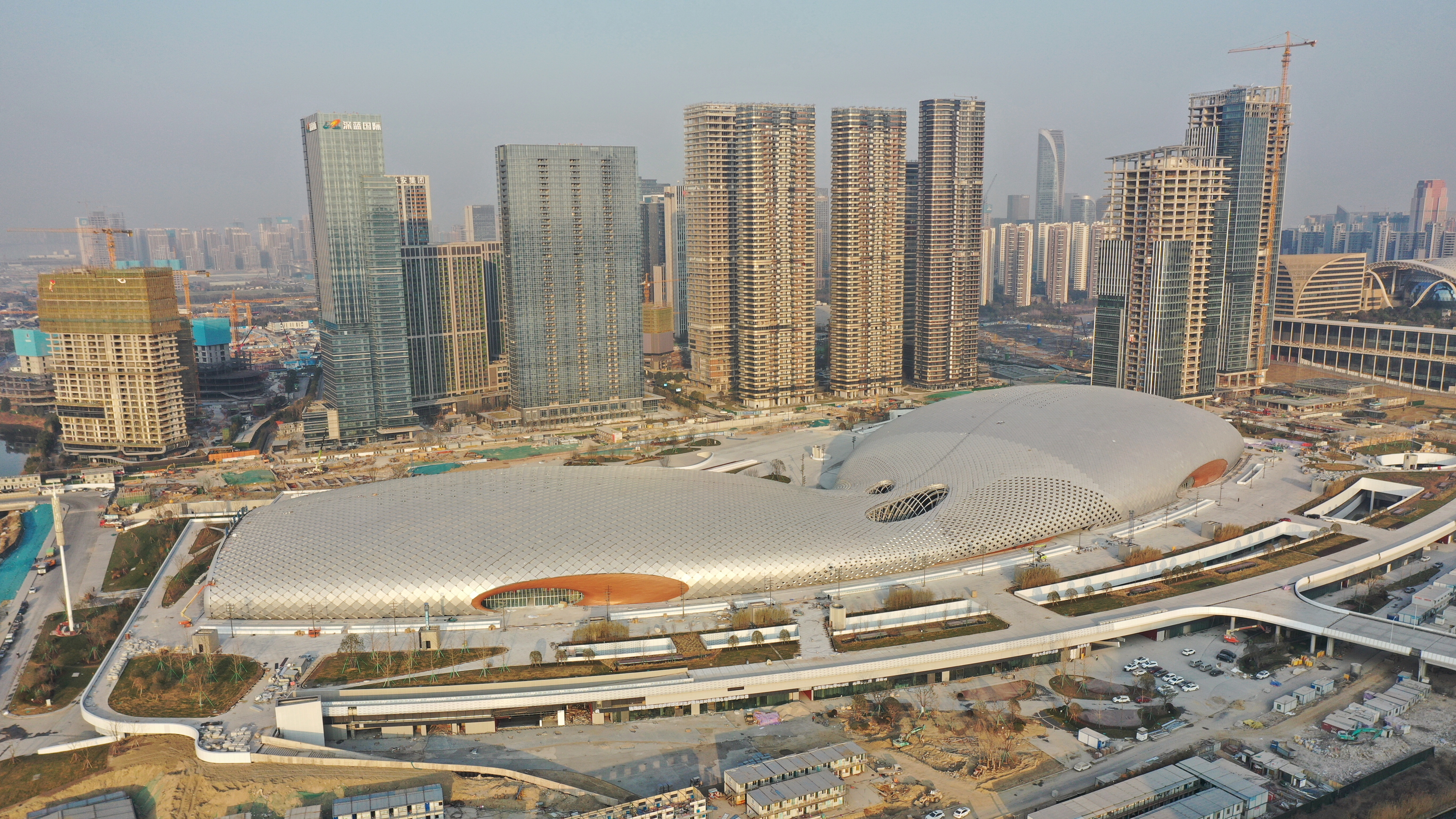

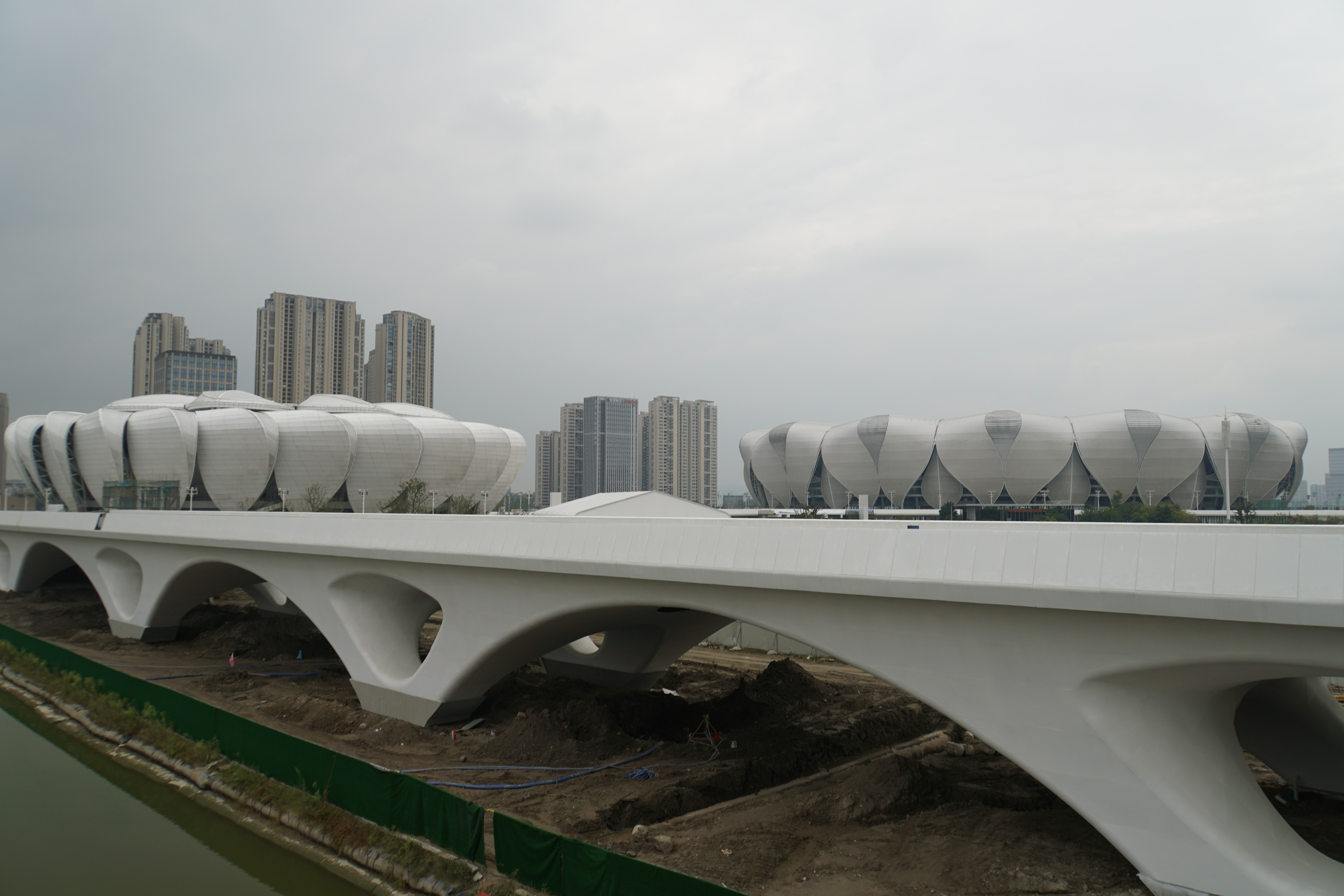

== See also ==
- Lists of stadiums

Preceded by Gelora Bung Karno Stadium; Jakarta	Asian Games; Opening and Closing Ceremonies; 2022	Succeeded by Paloma Mizuho Stadium; Nagoya
Preceded by Gelora Bung Karno Stadium; Jakarta	Asian Games; Athletics competitions Main venue 2022	Succeeded by Paloma Mizuho Stadium; Nagoya
Preceded by Pakansari Stadium; Cibinong	Asian Games Men's Football tournament Final Venue; 2022	Succeeded by TBD; TBD
Preceded by Gelora Bung Karno Stadium, Jakarta (Opening); Gelora Bung Karno Madya Stadium, Jakarta (Closing)	Asian Para Games; Opening and Closing Ceremonies; 2022	Succeeded by Paloma Mizuho Stadium; Nagoya
