= Pedro Rangel =

Mexican Paralympic swimmer (born 1979)

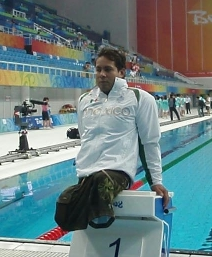
- image of Pedro Rangel

Personal information
- Full name: Pedro Rangel Haro
- Born: 13 December 1979 (age 46) Guadalajara, Jalisco, Mexico
Medal record
Men's swimming
Representing Mexico
Paralympic Games
Gold medal – first place	2008 Beijing	100m breaststroke SB5
Bronze medal – third place	2004 Athens	100m breaststroke SB5
Bronze medal – third place	2012 London	100m breaststroke SB5
Bronze medal – third place	2016 Rio de Janeiro	100m breaststroke SB5
World Championships
Gold medal – first place	2006 Durban	100m breaststroke SB5
Silver medal – second place	2006 Durban	4x50m freestyle relay
Silver medal – second place	2013 Montreal	100m breaststroke SB5
Bronze medal – third place	2022 Madeira	100 m breaststroke SB5
Parapan American Games
Gold medal – first place	2011 Guadalajara	100m breaststroke SB5
Silver medal – second place	2003 Mar del Plata	400m freestyle S7
Silver medal – second place	2003 Mar del Plata	100m breaststroke SB5
Silver medal – second place	2015 Toronto	100m breaststroke SB5
Silver medal – second place	2019 Lima	100m breaststroke SB5

Pedro Rangel Haro (Note: In this Spanish name, the first or paternal surname is Rangel and the second or maternal family name is Haro.) (born 13 December 1979 in Guadalajara, Jalisco) is a paralympic swimmer from Mexico competing mainly in category S5 events.

== Career ==
Pedro has competed in both the 2004 and 2008 Summer Paralympics competing in both the 4x50m freestyle, 4x50m medley as well as the 100m breaststroke. It was in the 100m breaststroke that gave him his only medal at both games a bronze medal in 2004 and a gold in 2008.
