= Swimming at the 2004 Summer Paralympics – Men's 100 metre breaststroke SB5 =

Men's 100m Breaststroke SB5 at the XII Paralympic Games
- Paralympic Swimming
- Venue: Olympic Aquatic Centre
- Dates: 24 September 2004
- Competitors: 12 from 10 nations
- Winning time: 1:33.01

Medalists
1st place, gold medalist(s)		Tadhg Slattery	South Africa
2nd place, silver medalist(s)		Kasper Engel	Netherlands
3rd place, bronze medalist(s)		Pedro Rangel	Mexico

The Men's 100 metre breaststroke SB5 swimming event at the 2004 Summer Paralympics was competed on 24 September. It was won by Tadhg Slattery, representing South Africa.

== 1st round ==
Qualified for next round

Heat 1

24 Sept. 2004, morning session

Rank	Athlete	Time	Notes
1	Aaron Paulson (USA)	1:38.70	
2	Thomas Grimm (GER)	1:39.77	
3	Adriano Lima (BRA)	1:42.87	
4	Luan Lioonrum (THA)	1:49.66	
5	Mateusz Michalski (POL)	1:55.33	
	Yuan Jie (CHN)	DSQ	

Heat 2

24 Sept. 2004, morning session

Rank	Athlete	Time	Notes
1	Tadhg Slattery (RSA)	1:33.03	
2	Kasper Engel (NED)	1:36.03	
3	Nils Grunenberg (GER)	1:38.87	
4	Pedro Rangel (MEX)	1:42.91	
5	Anders Olsson (SWE)	1:45.69	
6	Taweesook Samuksaneeto (THA)	1:46.40	

== Final round ==
24 Sept. 2004, evening session

Rank	Athlete	Time	Notes
1st place, gold medalist(s)	Tadhg Slattery (RSA)	1:33.01	
2nd place, silver medalist(s)	Kasper Engel (NED)	1:35.98	
3rd place, bronze medalist(s)	Pedro Rangel (MEX)	1:36.31	
4	Aaron Paulson (USA)	1:36.53	
5	Thomas Grimm (GER)	1:38.93	
6	Nils Grunenberg (GER)	1:39.68	
7	Adriano Lima (BRA)	1:44.12	
8	Anders Olsson (SWE)	1:44.68	
