= Water Cube =

Swimming center in Beijing, China

- Logo of the Water Cube

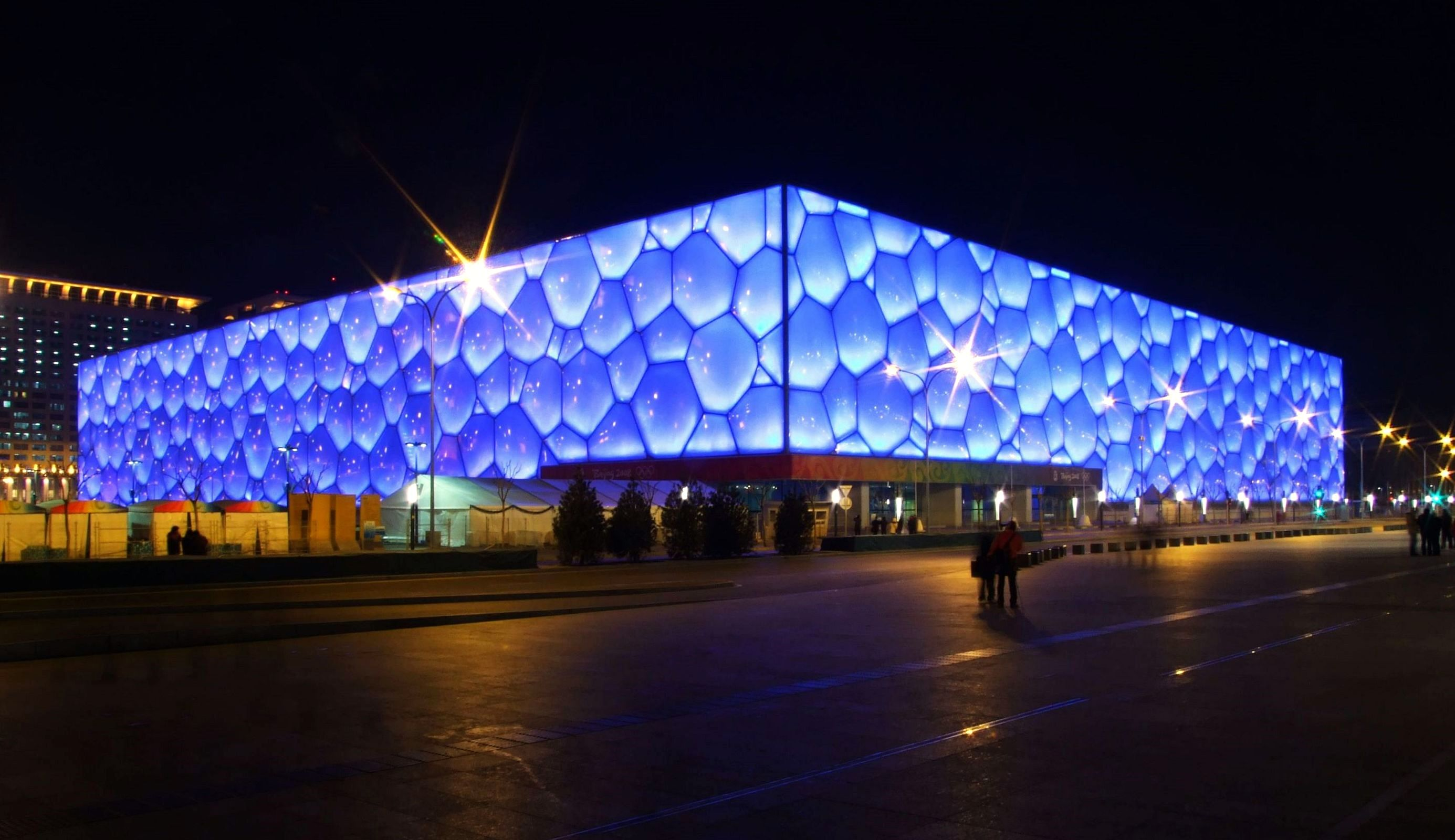
- The Water Cube at night
- Interactive map of Water Cube
- Full name: National Aquatics Centre
- Address: Beijing, China
- Coordinates: 39°59′30″N 116°23′03″E
- Capacity: 4,598 (17,000 during Olympics)
- Pool size: 50 m × 25 m × 3 m (164.0 ft × 82.0 ft × 9.8 ft)

Construction
- Built: 2004–2007
- Opened: 2008
- Cost: CNY940 million USD140 million EUR94 million
- Architects: PTW Architects, CSCEC, CCDI, and Arup

Website
- water-cube.com

The Water Cube (水立方), fully a.k.a. the National Aquatics Centre (国家游泳中心), is a swimming center at the Olympic Green in Chaoyang, Beijing, China.

The Water Cube was originally constructed to host the aquatics competitions at the 2008 Summer Olympics and Paralympics. During the 2008 Olympics—where it hosted diving, swimming and synchronized swimming events—25 world records were broken in this facility. In July 2010, a renovation of the facility was completed, which included the addition of a 12,000 m^{2} (130,000 sq ft) public water park. After renovation and adaptive configuration, the Water Cube also hosted the 2022 Winter Olympics and Paralympics.

== Architecture ==
In July 2003 the Water Cube design was chosen from 10 proposals in an international architectural competition for the aquatic center project. The Water Cube was specially designed and built by a consortium made up of PTW Architects (an Australian architecture firm), Arup international engineering group, CSCEC (China State Construction Engineering Corporation), and CCDI (China Construction Design International) of Shanghai. The Water Cube's design was initiated by a team effort: the Chinese partners felt a square was more symbolic to Chinese culture and its relationship to the Bird's Nest stadium while the Sydney-based partners came up with the idea of covering the 'cube' with bubbles, symbolizing water. Contextually, the Cube symbolizes Earth, while the circle (represented by the elliptic stadium) represents heaven, a common motif in ancient Chinese art.

Comprising a steel space frame, it is the largest ETFE-clad structure in the world with over 100,000 m^{2} of ETFE pillows that are only 0.2 mm (1/125 of an inch) in total thickness. The ETFE cladding, supplied and installed by the firm Vector Foiltec, allows more light and heat penetration than traditional glass, resulting in a 30% decrease in energy costs. This choice was made in view of Beijing's goal of presenting a fully "green" Olympic Games, with zero net growth in total carbon emissions. Likewise, the venue was also designed to "capture and recycle 80% of the water falling on the roof or lost from the pools."

The outer wall is based on the Weaire–Phelan structure, a structure devised from the natural pattern of bubbles in soap lather. In the true Weaire–Phelan structure the edge of each cell is curved in order to maintain 109.5 degree angles at each vertex (satisfying Plateau's rules), but of course as a structural support system each beam was required to be straight so as to better resist axial compression. The complex Weaire–Phelan pattern was developed by slicing through bubbles in soap foam, resulting in more irregular, organic patterns than foam bubble structures proposed earlier by the scientist Kelvin. Using the Weaire–Phelan geometry, the Water Cube's exterior cladding is made of 4,000 ETFE bubbles, some as large as 9.14 meters (30 ft) across, with seven different sizes for the roof and 15 for the walls.

The structure had a capacity of 17,000 during the games. It also has a total land surface of 65,000 square meters and covers a total of 32,000 m^{2} (7.9 acres). Although called the Water Cube, the aquatic center is really a rectangular box (cuboid) 178 meters (584 ft) square and 31 meters (102 ft) high. The building's popularity has spawned many copycat structures throughout China. For example, there is one-to-one copy of the facade near the ferry terminal in Macau – the Casino Oceanus by Paul Steelman.

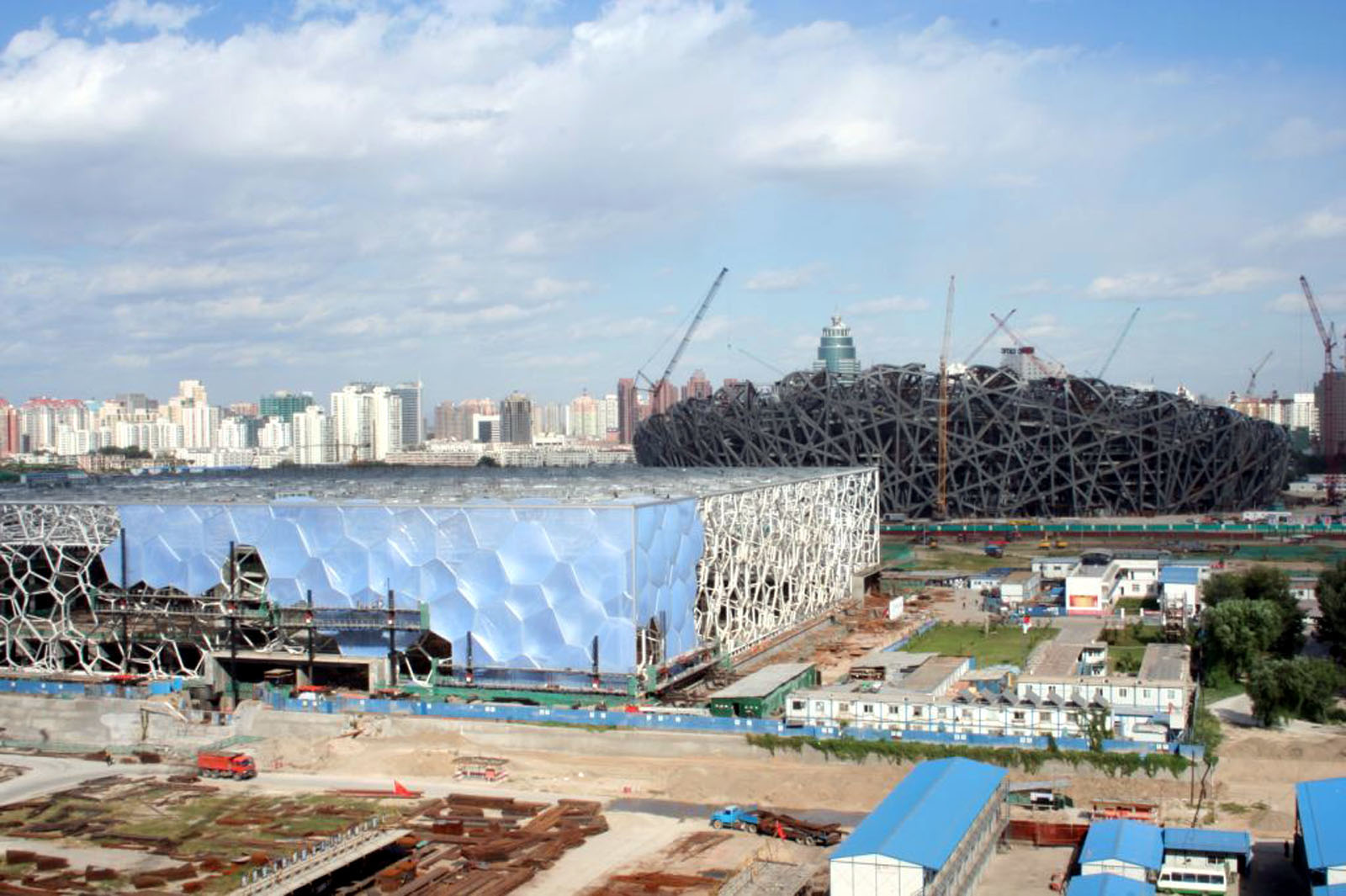
The Beijing National Aquatics Center while under construction

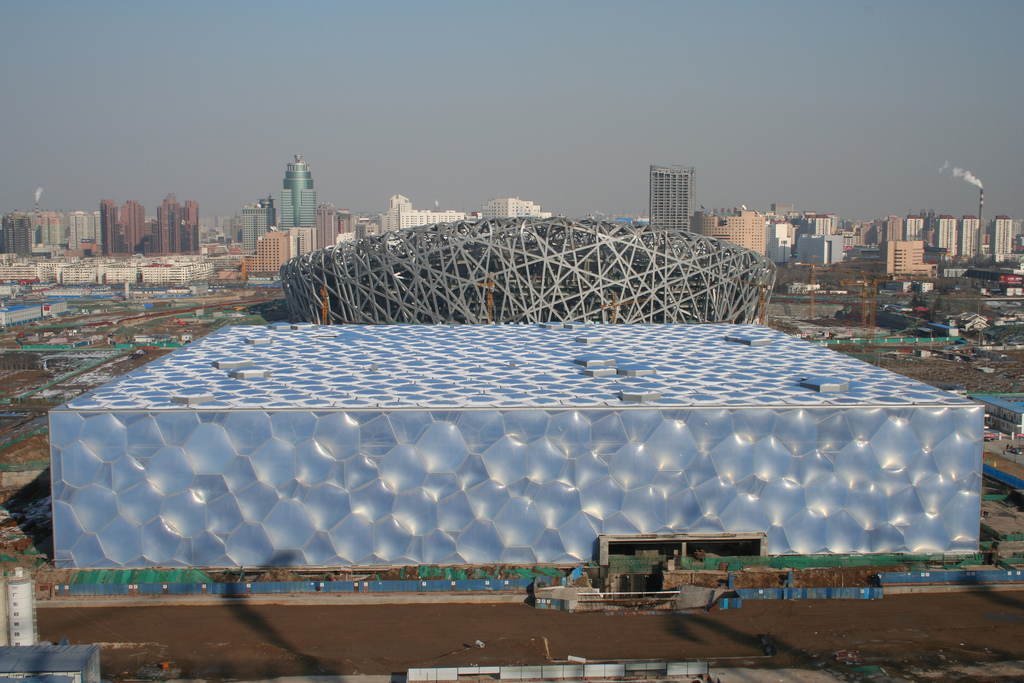
The National Aquatics Center under construction, with the Beijing National Stadium in the background

== Olympics ==
=== 2008 Summer Olympics ===
The Aquatics Center hosted the swimming, diving, and synchronized swimming events during the Olympics. Water polo was originally planned to be hosted in the venue but was moved to the Ying Tung Natatorium.

Many people believed the Water Cube to be the fastest Olympic pool in the world. Over the course of the Games, 25 world records were broken by athletes at the Water Cube, although all but two of them were achieved by swimmers wearing the controversial LZR Racer bodyskin (which led to restrictions on the use of such suits being implemented by FINA in 2010).

Water Cube during 2008 Beijing Summer Olympic Games

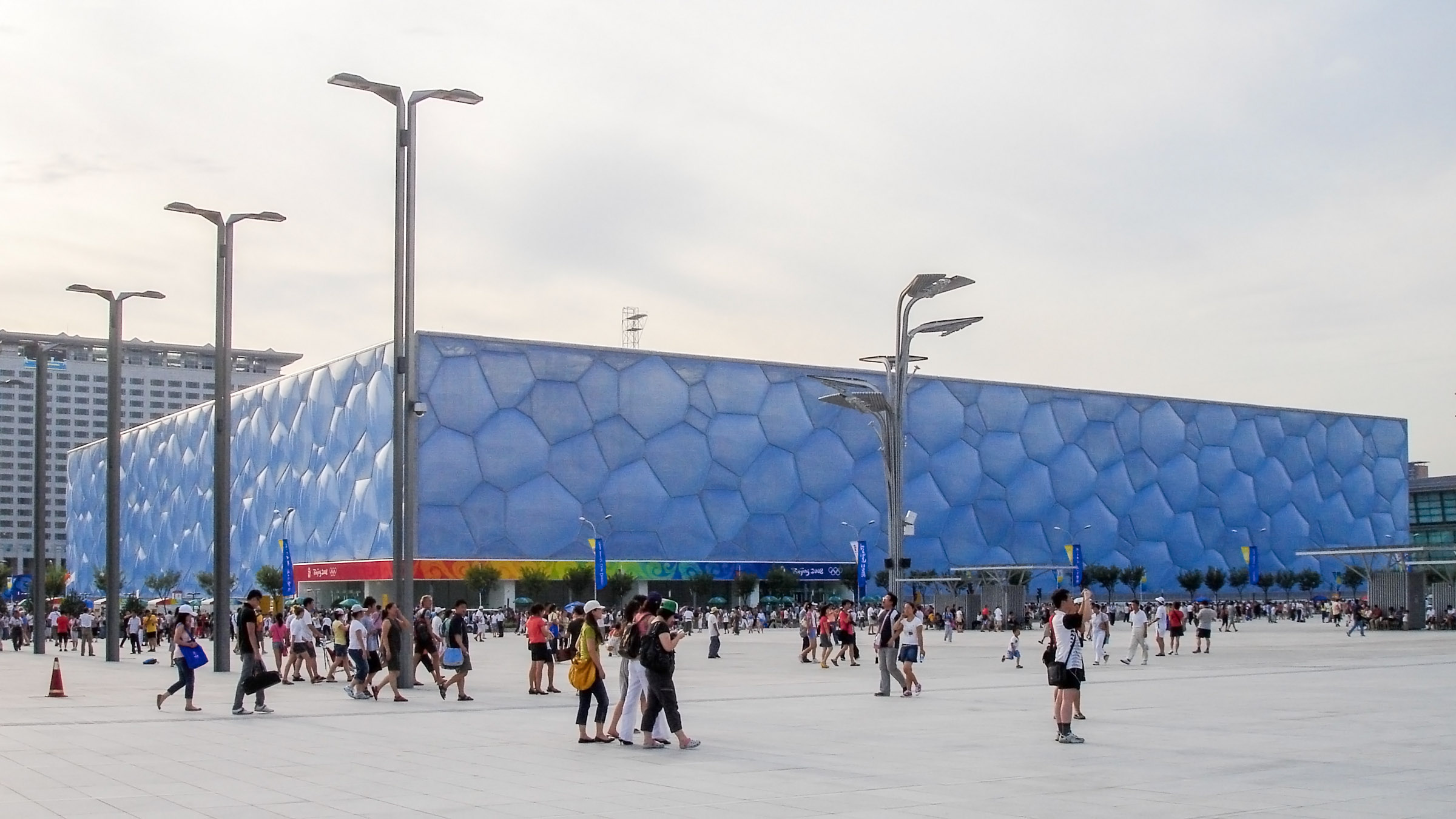

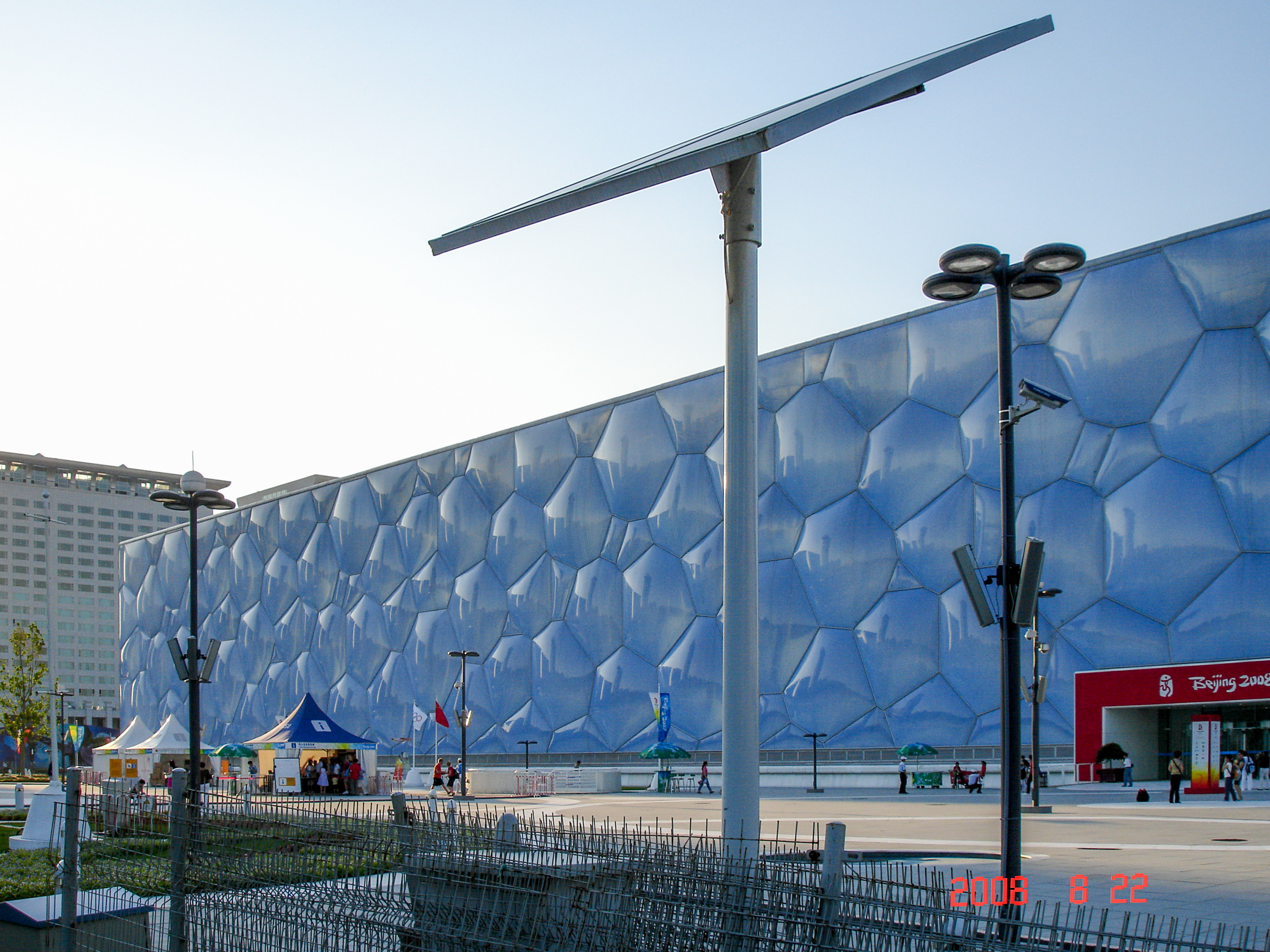

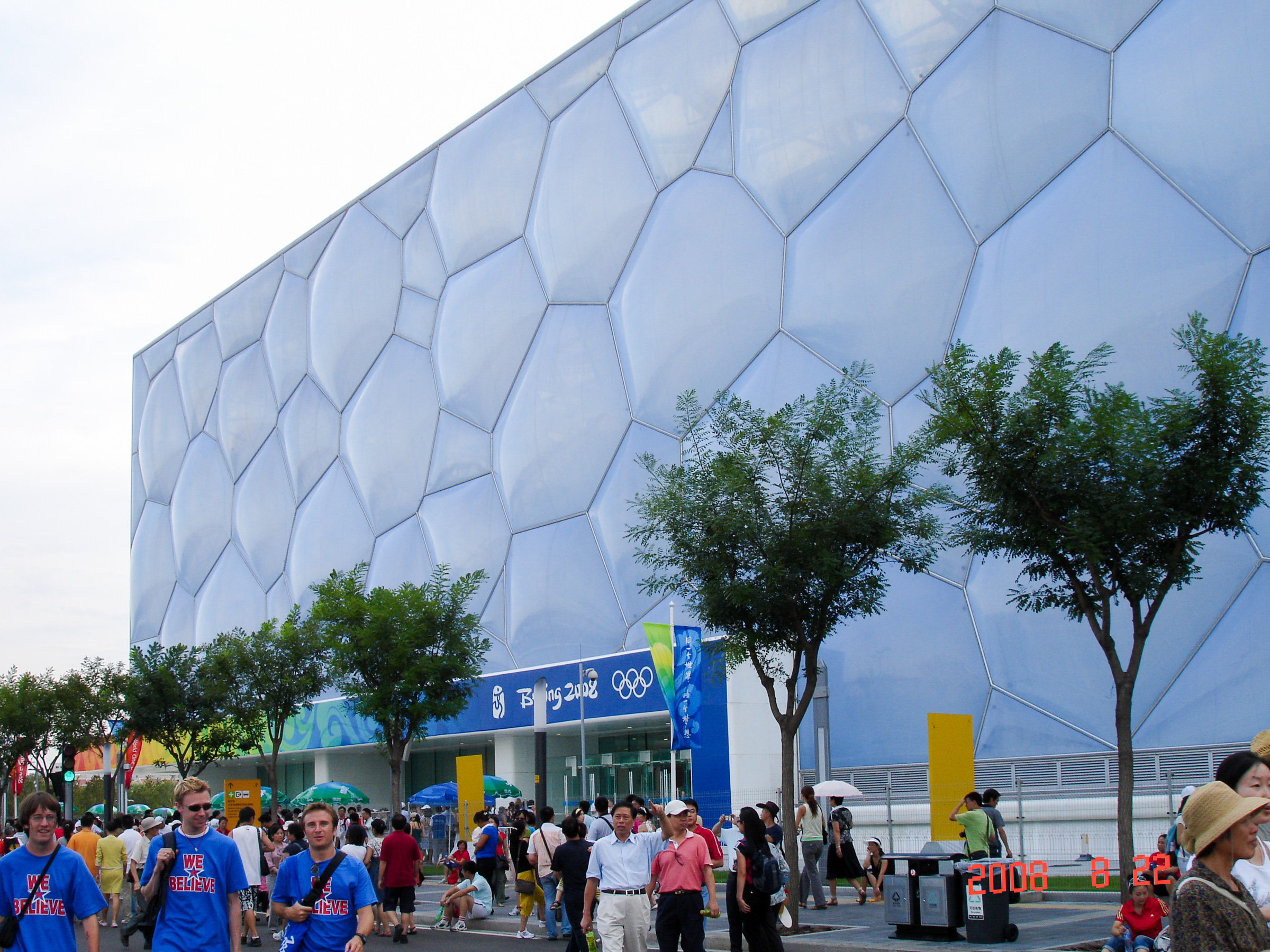

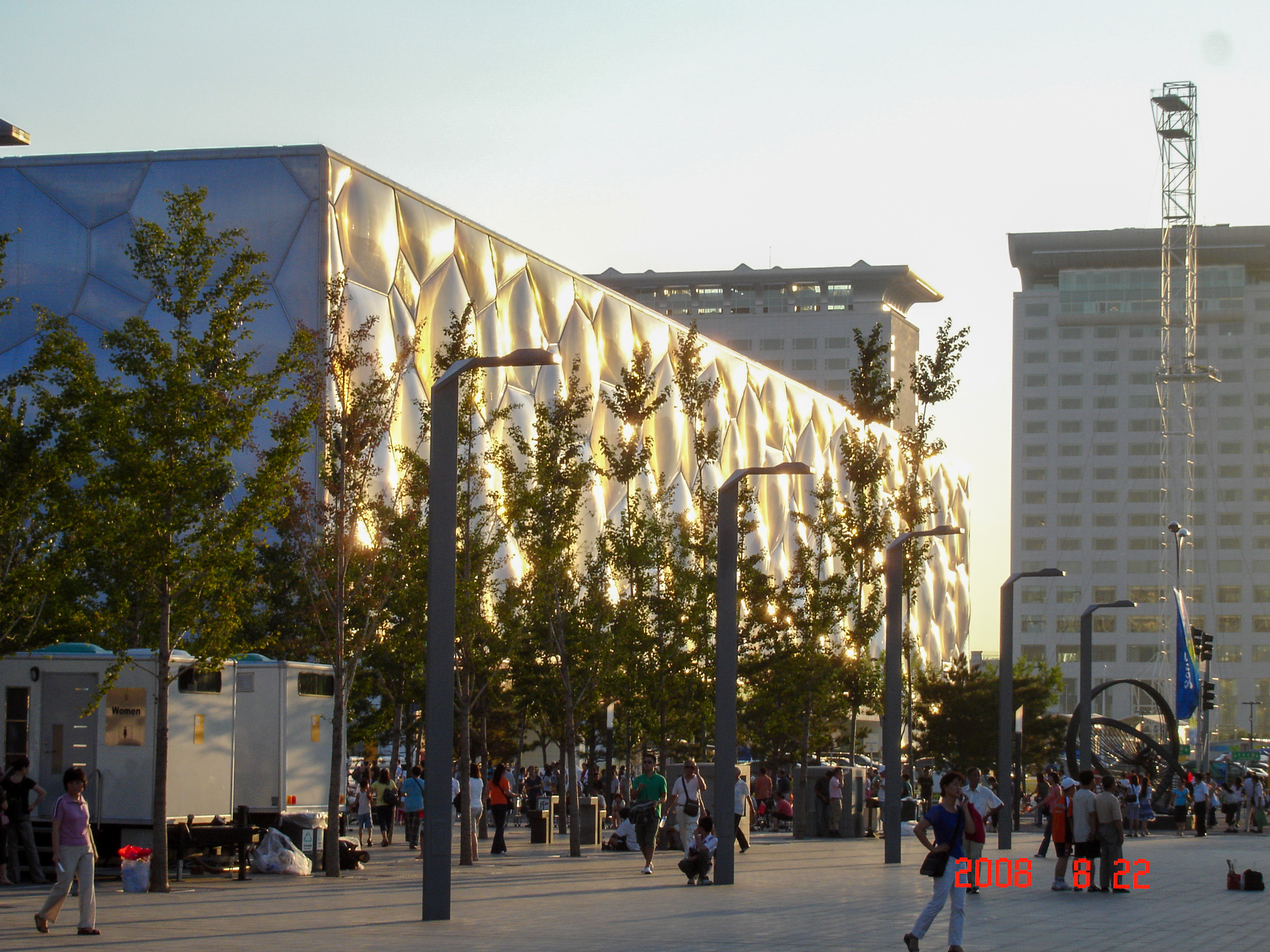

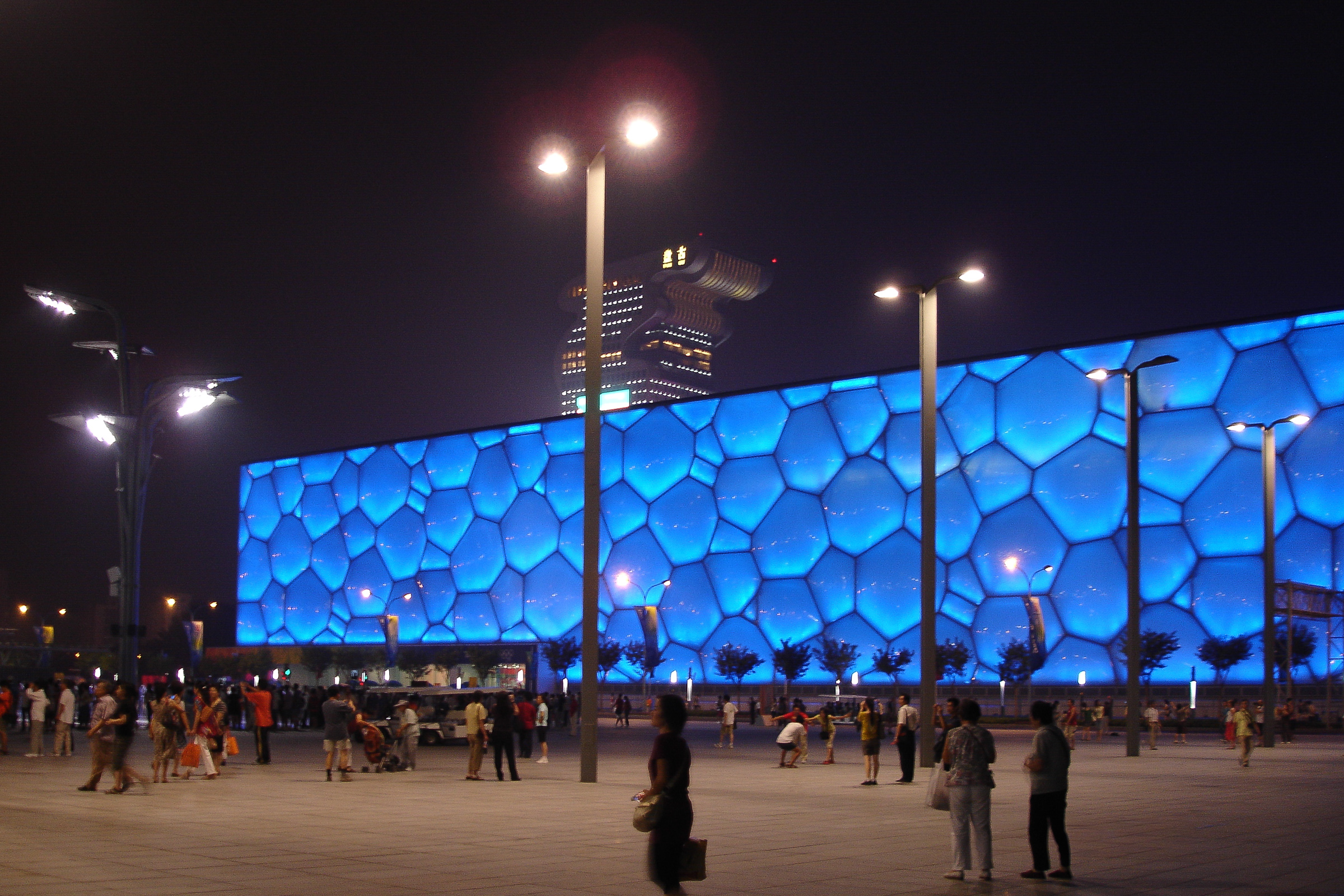

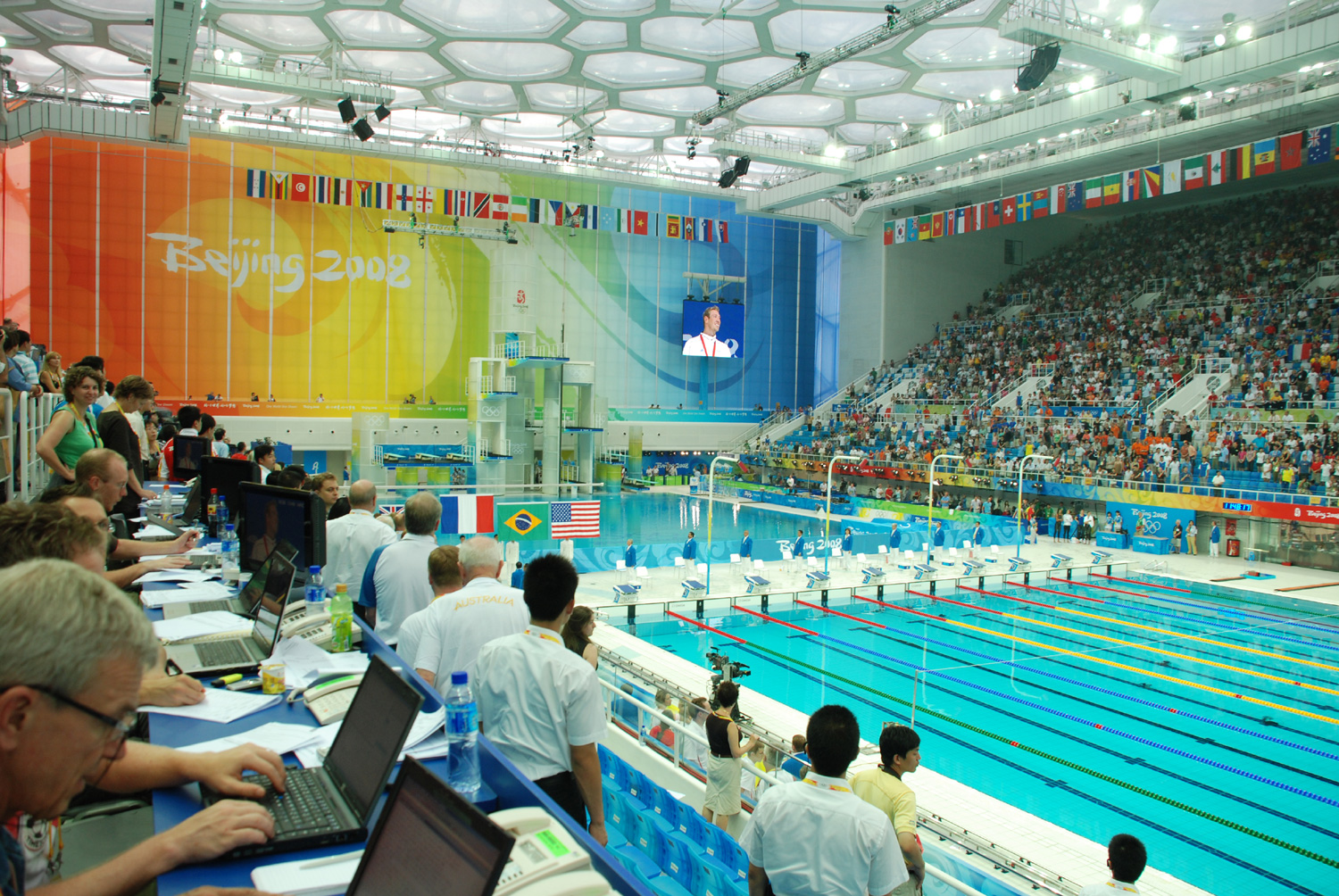
Inside the Water Cube on August 14, 2008

=== Post-2008 Olympics usage and legacy ===
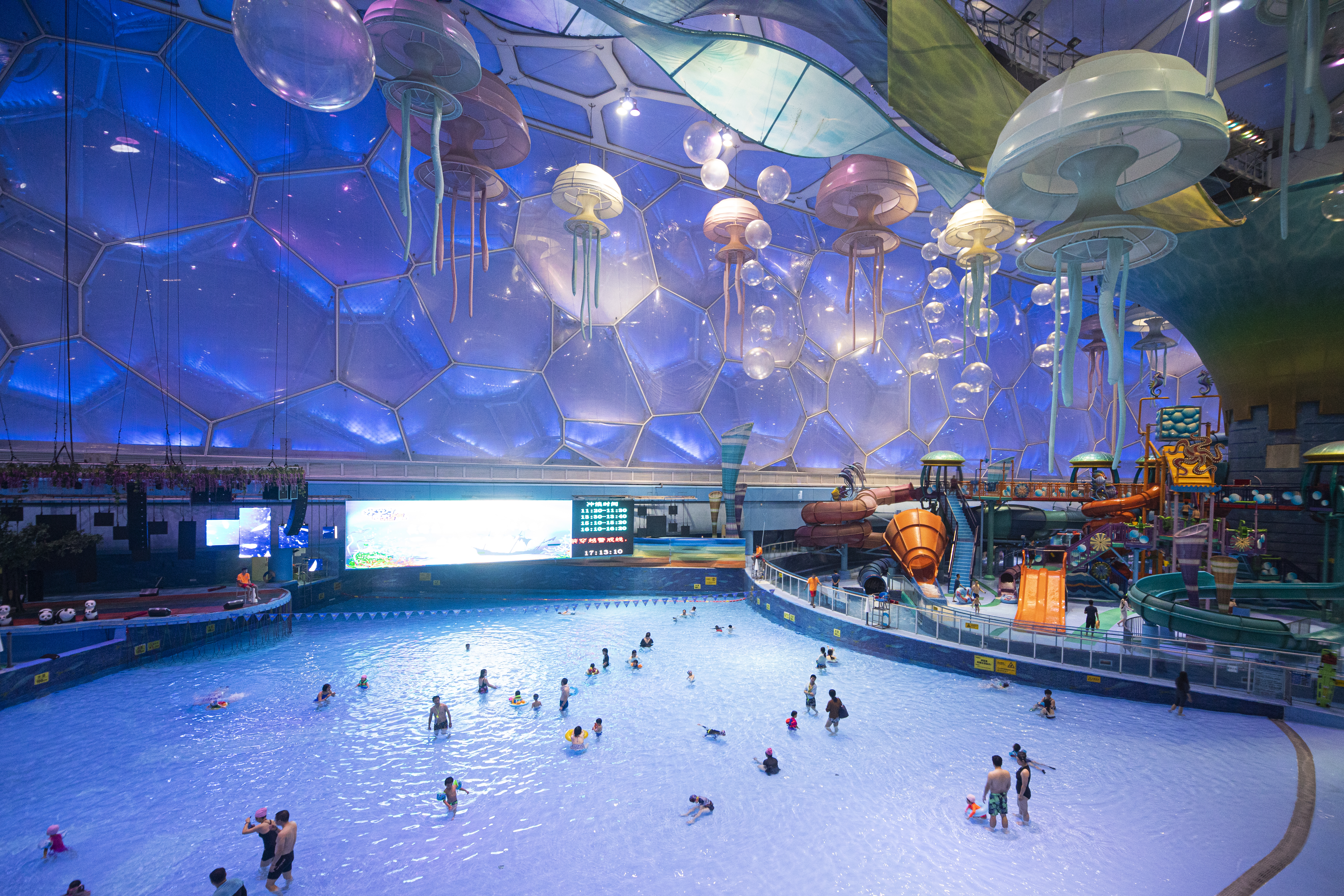
Indoor water park

Video: The Beijing National Aquatics Center reopened on July 28, 2010.

After the Olympics, the Water Cube was opened to the public on select days of the week beginning in June 2009, and was also used as the site for a production of Swan Lake among other shows. On 19 October 2009, the Water Cube was closed to the public to begin a renovation of a portion of the complex into a water park, led by Canadian design firm Forrec, promising "seven-story water slides and a wave machine, as well as attractions for the more land inclined such as shopping centers, cafes, and performance stages."

The facility officially reopened on 28 July 2010, with the water park opening on 8 August 2010 (the second anniversary of the Games' opening). The renovation divided the facility into three pool areas (a main pool, Olympic "demonstration" pool, and a training pool), as well as the 12,000 m^{2} (130,000 sq ft) water park area.

In July 2013, the Water Cube introduced a new LED light show on its exterior, "Nature and Man in Rhapsody of Light", by artist Jennifer Wen Ma and lighting designer Zheng Jiawei. Its colors are determined by trending use of emoji on Sina Weibo, which is in turn used to calculate the "mood" of the Chinese public

In 2018, it was reported that the venue had achieved revenues of 124 million yuan (about US$18 million), and has been breaking even for years.

=== 2022 Winter Olympics ===
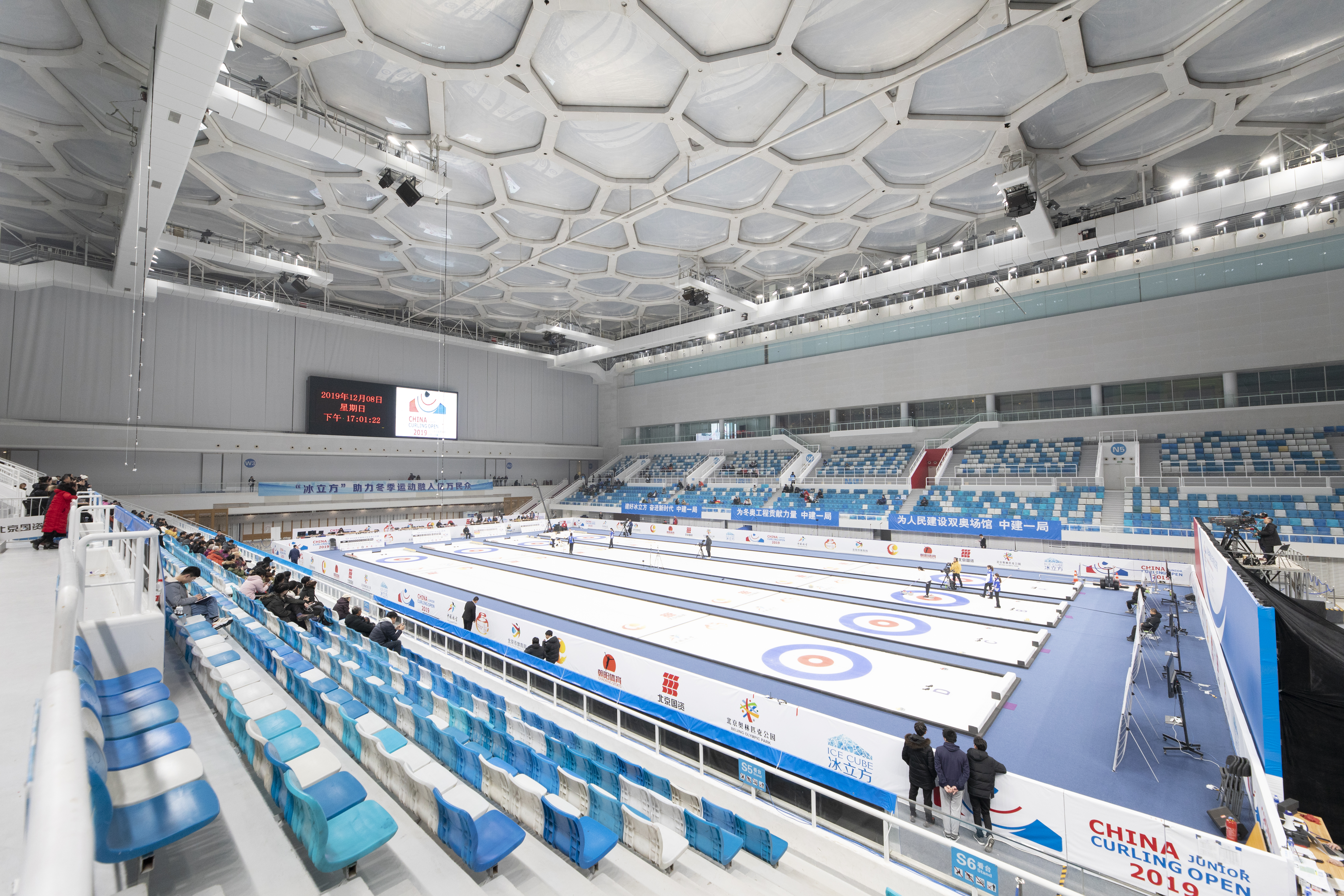
The venue in its new curling configuration.

The Water Cube hosted the curling events during the 2022 Winter Olympics and Paralympics, a configuration nicknamed the "Ice Cube". After Beijing was awarded the Games, work began on renovations to the facility to allow it to be converted to a curling rink, including the addition of ice-making equipment and other necessary climate control and monitoring systems. It hosted its first event in this configuration, the China Junior Curling Open, in December 2019, just two years prior to the 2022 Winter Olympics.

== Awards ==
The special award for the most accomplished work in the section Atmosphere is awarded to the Australian architecture firm PTW Architects, CSCEC + Design and Arup for the project National Swimming Center, Beijing Olympic Green, China. The project demonstrates in a stunning way, how the deliberate morphing of molecular science, architecture, and phenomenology can create an airy and misty atmosphere for a personal experience of water leisure

— Quote from the Jury report of the Official Awards 9th International Architecture Exhibition – METAMORPH, Venice Biennale

- 2004: Venice Biennale – Award for most accomplished work Atmosphere section
- 2006: Popular Science Best of what's new 2006 in engineering
- 2008: NSW Project of the Year award from the Australian Institute of Project Management
- 2009: 40th annual MacRobert Award, the UK's biggest prize for engineering innovation
- 2010: International Association for Bridge and Structural Engineering 2010 Outstanding Structure Award

== See also ==
- Chris Bosse
- Curling at the 2022 Winter Olympics
- Frei Otto
- Rob Leslie-Carter
- Swimming at the 2008 Summer Olympics
- Swimming at the 2008 Summer Paralympics
- Timothy Schreiber
- Wheelchair curling at the 2022 Winter Paralympics
