= Tadhg Slattery =

South African Paralympic swimmer

Medal record

Men's swimming

Representing South Africa

Paralympic Games
Gold medal – first place	1992 Barcelona	100 m breaststroke SB5
Gold medal – first place	2004 Athens	100 m breaststroke SB5
Silver medal – second place	1996 Atlanta	100 m breaststroke SB5
Silver medal – second place	2000 Sydney	100 m breaststroke SB5
Silver medal – second place	2000 Sydney	200 m individual medley SM6
Bronze medal – third place	2008 Beijing	100 m breaststroke SB5

Tadhg Slattery is a Paralympic swimmer from South Africa competing mainly in category SB5 events. He has cerebral palsy and is deaf.

Slattery competed as part of the South African Paralympic swimming team at six Paralympic games. His first games in 1992 gave him his first Paralympic gold medal in the 100m breaststroke in a world record time, as well as finishing fourth in his heat in the 50m freestyle, eighth in the final of the 50m butterfly, seventh in his heat of both the 100m and 400m freestyle. In the 1996 Summer Paralympics he finished second in the 100m breaststroke behind Kasper Engel of the Netherlands who set a new world record, he also competed in the 50m freestyle finishing 28th in the heats, 50m butterfly where he finished ninth in the heats just missing the final and finished fourth in the final of the 200m medley. At his third games in 2000 he again won silver in the 100m breaststroke behind Kasper and added a second in the 200m medley behind the new world record set by Sascha Kindred of Great Britain, as well as finishing seventh in the 50m butterfly. Tadhg won gold again in 2004 Summer Paralympics in the 100m breaststroke, beating his old rival Kasper Engel he also competed in the 200m medley finishing sixth but could not make the final of the 50m butterfly. His fifth games in 2008 led to his first bronze medal, in his favored 100m breaststroke and finished last in his heat in the 200m individual Medley. And his final sixth games in 2012 led to his fifth place. He is now retired from international swimming. He is now a full-time swimming coach for disabled people in Johannesburg, South Africa.

1992 Paralympic Games
50m Butterfly - S7	38.10	8th	
100 m Freestyle - S7	35.54	11th	
100 m Freestyle - S7	1:24.50	15th	
400 m Freestyle - S7	6:11.21	11th	
100m Breaststroke - SB5	1:36.54	1st place, gold medalist(s)	WR
1996 Paralympic Games
50 m Freestyle - S7	41.69	28th	
50m Butterfly - S7	37.46	9th	
200m individual medley - SM6	3:09.48	4th	
100m Breaststroke - SB5	1:38.90	2nd place, silver medalist(s)	
2000 Paralympic Games
50m Butterfly - S7	36.60	7th	
100m Breaststroke - SB5	1:36.12	2nd place, silver medalist(s)	
200m individual medley - SM6	2:59.37	2nd place, silver medalist(s)	
2004 Paralympic Games
200m individual medley - SM6	3:06.18	6th	
50m Butterfly - S7	40.53	15th	
100m Breaststroke - SB5	1:33.01	1st place, gold medalist(s)	
2008 Paralympic Games
100m Breaststroke - SB5	1:36.11	3rd place, bronze medalist(s)	
200m individual medley - SM6	3:12.49	9th	
2012 Paralympic Games
100m Breaststroke - SB5	1:39.16	5th	
