= Niels Grunenberg =

German Paralympic swimmer

Personal information
- Born: 30 March 1975 (age 51)

Sport
- Country: Germany
- Sport: Paralympic swimming
Medal record
Representing Germany
Paralympic Games
Silver medal – second place	2012 London	100 m breaststroke SB5
IPC Swimming World Championships
Bronze medal – third place	2013 Montreal	100 m breaststroke SB5
IPC Swimming European Championships
Bronze medal – third place	2014 Eindhoven	100 m breaststroke SB5

Niels Grunenberg (born 30 March 1975) is a German Paralympic swimmer. He represented Germany at the 2008 Summer Paralympics and at the 2012 Summer Paralympics and he won the silver medal in the men's 100 metres breaststroke SB5 event in 2012.

In 2013, he won the bronze medal in the men's 100 metre breaststroke SB5 event at the 2013 IPC Swimming World Championships held in Montreal, Quebec, Canada.
