= China Construction Design International =

Chinese architecture firm

CCDI Group
- Native name: 上海悉地工程设计顾问有限公司
- Type: Privately-owned enterprise
- Industry: Architecture, Consulting
- Founded: 1994
- Headquarters: Shanghai, China
- Owner: CCDI
- Parent: CCDI
- Subsidiaries: PTW Architects
- Website: ccdi.com.cn

CCDI Group (上海悉地工程设计顾问有限公司) is a Chinese multinational architecture and engineering consulting firm that provides integrated professional services for urban construction and development headquartered in Shanghai. Its business units cover broad industry sectors with diverse specialized expertise. CCDI operates cross-regionally with offices in Shanghai, Beijing, Shenzhen, Chengdu, Sydney, New York City, Qingdao, and Suzhou with branches and representative offices in Chongqing, Nanjing and twenty other cities in China. Over the years, CCDI has established strong client relationships with most major developers, enterprises, and city governments. Founded in 1994, CCDI is a subsidiary of the privately owned construction and engineering firm, China State Construction Engineering Corporation (CSEC).

From 1994 to 2002, CCDI's work focused on the south China market, working on residential projects and public facilities such as exhibition halls and sports arenas. But, in 2003, CCDI and a consortium of other firms, won an architectural competition with the innovative design of the Beijing National Aquatics Center which was constructed for the 2008 Summer Olympics. Since then, CCDI has experienced substantial growth.

In 2013, CCDI acquired PTW Architects, a privately owned Australian-based architectural firm with expanding business interests in China and Southeast Asia.

CCDI employs more than thousand architects, engineers, planners, project managers as well as design and management consultants to offer various critical services of strategic planning, design, development, construction, and operations related to buildings, transportation, and industries.

== Selected projects ==
- Beijing National Aquatics Center (2007)
- Beijing Olympic Green Tennis Center (2007)
- National Tennis Center
- Ping'an Financial Center
- Shanghai Rockbund Reconstruction Project
- Jinan Olympic Center
- Hangzhou Olympic Center
- Dameisha Vanke Center
- Tencent Headquarters
- Alibaba Headquarters
- Baidu Headquarters
- Harbin West Railway Station
- Beijing Kunlun Apartment
- Shenzhen City Crossing Complex
- Tianjin Cruise Terminal
- Shanghai International Tourism Resorts
