= Swimming at the 2012 Summer Paralympics – Women's 100 metre freestyle S7 =

Women's 100 metre freestyle S7 at the XIV Paralympic Games
- Venue: London Aquatics Centre
- Dates: 3 September
- Competitors: 15 from 12 nations

Medalists
| 1st place, gold medalist(s) | | Jacqueline Freney | Australia |
| 2nd place, silver medalist(s) | | Cortney Jordan | United States |
| 3rd place, bronze medalist(s) | | Susannah Rodgers | Great Britain |

The women's 100 metre freestyle S7 event at the 2012 Paralympic Games took place on 3 September, at the London Aquatics Centre.

Two heats were held, one with seven swimmers and one with eight swimmers. The swimmers with the eight fastest times advanced to the final.

== Heats ==
=== Heat 1 ===
| Rank | Lane | Name | Nationality | Time | Notes |
|---|---|---|---|---|---|
| 1 | 4 | Susannah Rodgers | Great Britain | 1:12.86 | Q |
| 2 | 5 | Kirsten Bruhn | Germany | 1:14.60 | Q |
| 3 | 6 | Ke Liting | China | 1:16.98 | Q, AS |
| 4 | 2 | Kim Jieun | South Korea | 1:17.80 | Q |
| 5 | 7 | Sarah Mehain | Canada | 1:21.69 | |
| 6 | 3 | Susana Ribeiro | Brazil | 1:22.09 | |
| 7 | 1 | Jessica Avilés | Mexico | 1:23.87 | |

=== Heat 2 ===
| Rank | Lane | Name | Nationality | Time | Notes |
|---|---|---|---|---|---|
| 1 | 4 | Jacqueline Freney | Australia | 1:09.74 | Q, PR |
| 2 | 5 | Cortney Jordan | United States | 1:13.92 | Q |
| 3 | 3 | Ani Palian | Ukraine | 1:14.16 | Q |
| 4 | 2 | Brianna Nelson | Canada | 1:18.01 | Q |
| 5 | 6 | Rebecca Dubber | New Zealand | 1:18.30 | |
| 6 | 7 | Erel Halevi | Israel | 1:19.71 | |
| 7 | 1 | Katrina Porter | Australia | 1:21.95 | |
| | 8 | Verônica Almeida | Brazil | DNS | |

== Final ==
| Rank | Lane | Name | Nationality | Time | Notes |
|---|---|---|---|---|---|
| 1st place, gold medalist(s) | 4 | Jacqueline Freney | Australia | 1:09.39 | PR |
| 2nd place, silver medalist(s) | 3 | Cortney Jordan | United States | 1:11.63 | |
| 3rd place, bronze medalist(s) | 5 | Susannah Rodgers | Great Britain | 1:12.61 | |
| 4 | 6 | Ani Palian | Ukraine | 1:13.67 | |
| 5 | 2 | Kirsten Bruhn | Germany | 1:14.43 | |
| 6 | 7 | Ke Liting | China | 1:17.15 | |
| 7 | 8 | Brianna Nelson | Canada | 1:17.77 | |
| 8 | 1 | Kim Jieun | South Korea | 1:18.03 | |
