= Swimming at the 2012 Summer Paralympics – Women's 50 metre freestyle S7 =

Women's 50 metre freestyle S7 at the XIV Paralympic Games
- Venue: London Aquatics Centre
- Dates: 4 September
- Competitors: 16 from 13 nations

Medalists
1st place, gold medalist(s)		Jacqueline Freney	Australia
2nd place, silver medalist(s)		Cortney Jordan	United States
3rd place, bronze medalist(s)		Ani Palian	Ukraine

The women's 50 metre freestyle S7 event at the 2012 Paralympic Games took place on 4 September, at the London Aquatics Centre.

Two heats were held, both with eight swimmers. The swimmers with the eight fastest times advanced to the final.

== Heats ==
Rank	Heat	Lane	Name	Nationality	Time	Notes
1	2	4	Jacqueline Freney	Australia	32.92	Q, PR
2	1	4	Ani Palian	Ukraine	33.63	Q
3	2	5	Cortney Jordan	United States	33.85	Q
4	2	3	Kirsten Bruhn	Germany	34.34	Q
5	1	5	Susannah Rodgers	Great Britain	34.74	Q
6	1	6	Brianna Nelson	Canada	35.43	Q
7	2	6	Sarah Mehain	Canada	35.66	Q
8	1	3	Verena Schott	Germany	35.94	Q
9	2	2	Jieun Kim	South Korea	36.25	
10	1	2	Oxana Guseva	Russia	36.80	
11	1	7	Rebecca Dubber	New Zealand	37.20	
12	2	7	Erel Halevi	Israel	38.30	
13	2	1	Verônica Almeida	Brazil	38.34	
14	1	8	Katrina Porter	Australia	39.14	
15	2	8	Jessica Avilés	Mexico	39.45	
16	1	1	Meri-Maari Makinen	Finland	40.58	

== Final ==
Rank	Lane	Name	Nationality	Time	Notes
1st place, gold medalist(s)	4	Jacqueline Freney	Australia	32.63	PR
2nd place, silver medalist(s)	5	Cortney Jordan	United States	33.18	
3rd place, bronze medalist(s)	2	Ani Palian	Ukraine	33.30	EU
4	3	Susannah Rodgers	Great Britain	34.08	
5	6	Kirsten Bruhn	Germany	34.24	
6	7	Brianna Nelson	Canada	35.32	
7	1	Sarah Mehain	Canada	35.42	
8	8	Verena Schott	Germany	36.46	
