= Swimming at the 2012 Summer Paralympics – Women's 100 metre backstroke S7 =

Women's 100m Backstroke S7 at the XIV Paralympic Games
- Venue: London Aquatics Centre
- Dates: 30 August
- Competitors: 16 from 13 nations
- Winning time: 1:22.84

Medalists
1st place, gold medalist(s)		Jacqueline Freney	Australia
2nd place, silver medalist(s)		Kirsten Bruhn	Germany
3rd place, bronze medalist(s)		Cortney Jordan	United States

The women's 100m backstroke S7 event at the 2012 Summer Paralympics took place at the London Aquatics Centre on 30 August. There were two heats; the swimmers with the eight fastest times advanced to the final.

== Results ==
=== Heats ===
Competed from 10:47.

==== Heat 1 ====
Rank	Lane	Name	Nationality	Time	Notes
1	5	Jacqueline Freney	Australia	1:23.34	Q, PR
2	3	Susannah Rodgers	Great Britain	1:26.09	Q
3	4	Rebecca Dubber	New Zealand	1:26.26	Q
4	6	Brianna Nelson	Canada	1:29.30	Q
5	2	Sarah Mehain	Canada	1:31.07	
6	7	Kim Jieun	South Korea	1:33.41	AS
7	1	Oxana Guseva	Russia	1:35.09	
8	8	Mina Marie Heyerdal Klausen	Norway	1:38.75	

==== Heat 2 ====
Rank	Lane	Name	Nationality	Time	Notes
1	4	Kirsten Bruhn	Germany	1:25.12	Q
2	3	Cortney Jordan	United States	1:27.62	Q
3	5	Katrina Porter	Australia	1:27.80	Q
4	2	Zhang Ying	China	1:27.89	Q, AS
5	7	Verena Schott	Germany	1:30.43	
6	1	Jessica Sarai Aviles Hernandez	Mexico	1:37.28	
7	6	Susana Ribeiro	Brazil	1:39.28	
8	8	Meri-Maari Makinen	Finland	1:42.69	

=== Final ===
Competed at 19:00.

Rank	Lane	Name	Nationality	Time	Notes
1st place, gold medalist(s)	4	Jacqueline Freney	Australia	1:22.84	PR
2nd place, silver medalist(s)	5	Kirsten Bruhn	Germany	1:25.22	
3rd place, bronze medalist(s)	2	Cortney Jordan	United States	1:25.33	
4	1	Zhang Ying	China	1:25.63	AS
5	6	Rebecca Dubber	New Zealand	1:25.80	
6	3	Susannah Rodgers	Great Britain	1:26.03	
7	7	Katrina Porter	Australia	1:26.64	
8	8	Brianna Nelson	Canada	1:30.17	

'Q = qualified for final. PR = Paralympic Record. AS = Asian Record.
