= Swimming at the 2012 Summer Paralympics – Women's 400 metre freestyle S7 =

Women's 400 metre freestyle S7 at the XIV Paralympic Games
- Venue: London Aquatics Centre
- Dates: 6 September
- Competitors: 11 from 10 nations

Medalists
1st place, gold medalist(s)		Jacqueline Freney	Australia
2nd place, silver medalist(s)		Cortney Jordan	United States
3rd place, bronze medalist(s)		Susannah Rodgers	Great Britain

The women's 400 metre freestyle S7 event at the 2012 Paralympic Games took place on 6 September, at the London Aquatics Centre.

Two heats were held, one with six swimmers and one with five swimmers. The swimmers with the eight fastest times advanced to the final.

== Heats ==
=== Heat 1 ===
Rank	Lane	Name	Nationality	Time	Notes
1	4	Susannah Rodgers	Great Britain	5:22.08	Q, EU
2	5	Ani Palian	Ukraine	5:23.49	Q
3	2	Brianna Nelson	Canada	5:46.00	Q
4	6	Erel Halevi	Israel	5:48.43	
5	3	Susana Ribeiro	Brazil	5:58.64	

=== Heat 2 ===
Rank	Lane	Name	Nationality	Time	Notes
1	4	Jacqueline Freney	Australia	5:01.04	Q, PR
2	5	Cortney Jordan	United States	5:25.75	Q
3	3	Rebecca Dubber	New Zealand	5:27.79	Q
4	2	Katrina Porter	Australia	5:44.50	Q
5	6	Verena Schott	Germany	5:46.04	Q
6	7	Jessica Sarai Aviles Hernandez	Mexico	6:05.13	

== Final ==
Rank	Lane	Name	Nationality	Time	Notes
1st place, gold medalist(s)	4	Jacqueline Freney	Australia	4:59.02	WR
2nd place, silver medalist(s)	6	Cortney Jordan	United States	5:18.55	
3rd place, bronze medalist(s)	5	Susannah Rodgers	Great Britain	5:18.93	EU
4	3	Ani Palian	Ukraine	5:21.73	
5	2	Rebecca Dubber	New Zealand	5:30.05	
6	1	Brianna Nelson	Canada	5:40.64	
7	7	Katrina Porter	Australia	5:41.48	
8	8	Verena Schott	Germany	5:42.26	
