= Swimming at the 2004 Summer Paralympics – Women's 50 metre freestyle S7 =

Women's 50m Freestyle S7 at the XII Paralympic Games
- Paralympic Swimming
- Venue: Olympic Aquatic Centre
- Dates: 26 September 2004
- Competitors: 16 from 14 nations
- Winning time: 34.34

Medalists
1st place, gold medalist(s)		Erin Popovich	United States
2nd place, silver medalist(s)		Kirsten Bruhn	Germany
3rd place, bronze medalist(s)		Danielle Campo	Canada

The Women's 50 metre freestyle S7 swimming event at the 2004 Summer Paralympics was competed on 26 September. It was won by Erin Popovich, representing United States.

== 1st round ==
Qualified for final round

Heat 1

26 Sept. 2004, morning session

Rank	Athlete	Time	Notes
1	Danielle Campo (CAN)	36.07	
2	Chantel Wolfenden (AUS)	36.48	
3	Huang Min (CHN)	36.65	
4	Nathalie Suter (SUI)	37.01	
5	Hilde Saeves (NOR)	37.30	
6	Dacil Cabrera (ESP)	39.35	
7	Stacey Williams (AUS)	41.18	
8	Polina Dzhurova (BUL)	43.11	

Heat 2

26 Sept. 2004, morning session

Rank	Athlete	Time	Notes
1	Erin Popovich (USA)	35.13	
2	Kirsten Bruhn (GER)	35.52	
3	Kristin Hakonardottir (ISL)	35.76	
4	Margita Prokeinova (SVK)	37.19	
5	Oxana Guseva (RUS)	37.97	
6	Miyuki Yasuda (JPN)	38.34	
7	Marlena Lewandowska (POL)	38.67	
8	Tamara Vaucher (SUI)	42.70	

== Final round ==
26 Sept. 2004, evening session

Rank	Athlete	Time	Notes
1st place, gold medalist(s)	Erin Popovich (USA)	34.34	WR
2nd place, silver medalist(s)	Kirsten Bruhn (GER)	34.92	
3rd place, bronze medalist(s)	Danielle Campo (CAN)	35.17	
4	Kristin Hakonardottir (ISL)	35.47	
5	Chantel Wolfenden (AUS)	35.62	
6	Huang Min (CHN)	36.26	
7	Margita Prokeinova (SVK)	36.83	
8	Nathalie Suter (SUI)	37.18	
