= Swimming at the 2016 Summer Paralympics – Women's 100 metre backstroke S7 =

Women's 100 metre backstroke S7 at the XV Paralympic Games
- Venue: Olympic Aquatics Stadium
- Dates: 8 September 2016
- Competitors: 14 from 8 nations

Medalists
1st place, gold medalist(s)		Liting Ke	China
2nd place, silver medalist(s)		Ying Zhang	China
3rd place, bronze medalist(s)		Rebecca Dubber	New Zealand

The women's 100 metre backstroke S7 event at the 2016 Paralympic Games took place on 8 September 2016, at the Olympic Aquatics Stadium. Two heats were held. The swimmers with the eight fastest times advanced to the final. Two heats were held, each with seven swimmers. The swimmers with the eight fastest times advanced to the final.

== Records ==
Prior to the competition, the World and Paralympic records were:

World record	Kirsten Bruhn (GER)	1:21.57	Sheffield, Great Britain	6 April 2012
Paralympic record	Jacqueline Freney (AUS)	1:22.84	London, Great Britain	30 August 2012
2016 World leading	Rebecca Dubber (NZL)	1:24.92	Auckland, New Zealand	29 March 2016

== Heats ==
=== Heat 1 ===
12:04 8 September 2016:

Rank	Lane	Name	Nationality	Time	Notes
1	5	Rebecca Dubber	New Zealand	1:23.62	Q
2	3	Nikita Howarth	New Zealand	1:24.69	Q
3	4	Yajing Huang	China	1:25.34	Q
4	6	Denise Grahl	Germany	1:28.08	Q
5	2	Tess Routliffe	Canada	1:29.96	
6	7	Arianna Talamona	Italy	1:33.46	
7	1	Meri-Maari Makinen	Finland	1:39.56	

=== Heat 2 ===
12:08 8 September 2016:

Rank	Lane	Name	Nationality	Time	Notes
1	4	Liting Ke	China	1:22.72	PR Q
2	5	Ying Zhang	China	1:24.97	Q
3	6	McKenzie Coan	United States	1:25.34	Q
4	3	Cortney Jordan	United States	1:25.54	Q
5	2	Verena Schott	Germany	1:28.12	
6	7	Sarah Mehain	Canada	1:32.65	
7	1	Brenda Tilk	Estonia	1:38.99	

== Final ==
20:39 8 September 2016:

Rank	Lane	Name	Nationality	Time	Notes
1st place, gold medalist(s)	4	Liting Ke	China	1:23.06	
2nd place, silver medalist(s)	6	Ying Zhang	China	1:23.34	
3rd place, bronze medalist(s)	5	Rebecca Dubber	New Zealand	1:23.85	
4	2	Yajing Huang	China	1:24.53	
5	7	McKenzie Coan	United States	1:25.17	
6	3	Nikita Howarth	New Zealand	1:25.37	
7	1	Cortney Jordan	United States	1:25.95	
8	8	Denise Grahl	Germany	1:29.87	
