= Swimming at the 2012 Summer Paralympics – Women's 100 metre breaststroke SB7 =

Women's 100m Breaststroke SB7 at the XIV Paralympic Games
- Venue: London Aquatics Centre
- Dates: 1 September
- Competitors: 12 from 9 nations
- Winning time: 1:29.28

Medalists
| 1st place, gold medalist(s) | | Jessica Long | United States |
| 2nd place, silver medalist(s) | | Oksana Khrul | Ukraine |
| 3rd place, bronze medalist(s) | | Lisa den Braber | Netherlands |

The women's 100m breaststroke SB7 event at the 2012 Summer Paralympics took place at the London Aquatics Centre on 1 September. There were two heats; the swimmers with the eight fastest times advanced to the final.

== Results ==
=== Heats ===
Competed from 11:52.

==== Heat 1 ====
| Rank | Lane | Name | Nationality | Time | Notes |
|---|---|---|---|---|---|
| 1 | 5 | Oksana Khrul | Ukraine | 1:37.12 | Q |
| 2 | 6 | Sarah Mehain | Canada | 1:48.90 | Q |
| 3 | 4 | Mallory Weggemann | United States | 1:50.05 | Q |
| 4 | 2 | Brianna Nelson | Canada | 1:54.01 | Q |
| 5 | 7 | Meri-Maari Makinen | Finland | 2:02.32 | |
| | 3 | Emma Hollis | Great Britain | DNS | |

==== Heat 2 ====
| Rank | Lane | Name | Nationality | Time | Notes |
|---|---|---|---|---|---|
| 1 | 4 | Jessica Long | United States | 1:29.79 | Q, PR |
| 2 | 5 | Lisa den Braber | Netherlands | 1:37.61 | Q |
| 3 | 6 | Susana Ribeiro | Brazil | 1:38.39 | Q |
| 4 | 3 | Tan Xu | China | 1:41.07 | Q |
| 5 | 7 | Cortney Jordan | United States | 1:56.53 | |
| | 2 | Mina Marie Heyerdal Klausen | Norway | DSQ | |

=== Final ===
Competed at 20:27.

| Rank | Lane | Name | Nationality | Time | Notes |
|---|---|---|---|---|---|
| 1st place, gold medalist(s) | 4 | Jessica Long | United States | 1:29.28 | PR |
| 2nd place, silver medalist(s) | 5 | Oksana Khrul | Ukraine | 1:35.68 | |
| 3rd place, bronze medalist(s) | 3 | Lisa den Braber | Netherlands | 1:37.02 | |
| 4 | 6 | Susana Ribeiro | Brazil | 1:38.71 | |
| 5 | 2 | Tan Xu | China | 1:39.67 | |
| 6 | 1 | Mallory Weggemann | United States | 1:43.62 | |
| 7 | 7 | Sarah Mehain | Canada | 1:47.29 | |
| 8 | 8 | Brianna Nelson | Canada | 1:54.19 | |

Q = qualified for final. PR = Paralympic Record. DSQ = Disqualified. DNS = Did not start.
