= Swimming at the 2012 Summer Paralympics – Women's 50 metre butterfly S7 =

Women's 50m Butterfly S7 at the XIV Paralympic Games
- Venue: London Aquatics Centre
- Dates: 31 August
- Competitors: 14 from 11 nations
- Winning time: 35.16

Medalists
1st place, gold medalist(s)		Jacqueline Freney	Australia
2nd place, silver medalist(s)		Brianna Nelson	Canada
3rd place, bronze medalist(s)		Huang Min	China

The women's 50m butterfly S7 event at the 2012 Summer Paralympics took place at the London Aquatics Centre on 31 August. There were two heats; the swimmers with the eight fastest times advanced to the final.

== Results ==
=== Heats ===
Competed from 10:07.

==== Heat 1 ====
Rank	Lane	Name	Nationality	Time	Notes
1	4	Susannah Rodgers	Great Britain	37.45	Q
2	5	Ani Palian	Ukraine	39.37	Q
3	2	Sarah Mehain	Canada	39.44	Q
4	3	Tan Xu	China	39.61	Q
5	6	Verena Schott	Germany	40.83	
6	7	Nikita Howarth	New Zealand	40.94	
7	1	Gitta Raczko	Hungary	48.06	

==== Heat 2 ====
Rank	Lane	Name	Nationality	Time	Notes
1	4	Jacqueline Freney	Australia	36.03	Q, OC
2	2	Brianna Nelson	Canada	36.87	Q
3	5	Huang Min	China	37.73	Q
4	6	Veronica Almeida	Brazil	39.93	Q
5	3	Yang Tianshu	China	40.85	
6	7	Oxana Guseva	Russia	41.57	
7	1	Marianne Fredbo	Norway	43.41	

=== Final ===
Competed at 17:59.

Rank	Lane	Name	Nationality	Time	Notes
1st place, gold medalist(s)	4	Jacqueline Freney	Australia	35.16	OC
2nd place, silver medalist(s)	5	Brianna Nelson	Canada	36.03	
3rd place, bronze medalist(s)	6	Huang Min	China	36.50	
4	3	Susannah Rodgers	Great Britain	37.54	
5	2	Ani Palian	Ukraine	38.71	
6	1	Tan Xu	China	39.14	
7	8	Veronica Almeida	Brazil	39.63	
8	7	Sarah Mehain	Canada	39.93	

'Q = qualified for final. OC = Oceania Record.
