= Swimming at the 2012 Summer Paralympics – Women's 200 metre individual medley SM7 =

Women's 200m Ind. Medley SM7 at the XIV Paralympic Games
- Venue: London Aquatics Centre
- Dates: 2 September
- Competitors: 11 from 9 nations
- Winning time: 2:54.42

Medalists
1st place, gold medalist(s)		Jacqueline Freney	Australia
2nd place, silver medalist(s)		Brianna Nelson	Canada
3rd place, bronze medalist(s)		Huang Min	China

The women's 200m ind. medley SM7 event at the 2012 Summer Paralympics took place at the London Aquatics Centre on 2 September 2012. There were two heats, and the swimmers with the eight fastest times advanced to the final.

== Results ==
=== Heats ===
Competed from 09:41.

==== Heat 1 ====
Rank	Lane	Name	Nationality	Time	Notes
1	5	Huang Min	China	3:11.44	Q
2	4	Susana Ribeiro	Brazil	3:12.23	Q
3	3	Nikita Howarth	New Zealand	3:13.77	Q
4	6	Tan Xu	China	3:19.76	
5	2	Gitta Raczko	Hungary	3:42.57	

==== Heat 2 ====
Rank	Lane	Name	Nationality	Time	Notes
1	4	Jacqueline Freney	Australia	2:56.00	Q, OC
2	3	Brianna Nelson	Canada	3:05.88	Q
3	5	Cortney Jordan	United States	3:13.79	Q
4	6	Oxana Guseva	Russia	3:15.81	Q
5	2	Sarah Mehain	Canada	3:16.08	Q
6	7	Jessica Sarai Aviles Hernandez	Mexico	3:51.37	

=== Final ===
Competed at 17:39.

Rank	Lane	Name	Nationality	Time	Notes
1st place, gold medalist(s)	4	Jacqueline Freney	Australia	2:54.42	WR
2nd place, silver medalist(s)	5	Brianna Nelson	Canada	3:04.60	
3rd place, bronze medalist(s)	3	Huang Min	China	3:07.51	
4	7	Cortney Jordan	United States	3:08.49	
5	6	Susana Ribeiro	Brazil	3:10.42	
6	2	Nikita Howarth	New Zealand	3:10.48	
7	8	Sarah Mehain	Canada	3:12.06	
8	1	Oxana Guseva	Russia	3:15.87	

'Q = qualified for final. WR = World Record. OC = Oceania Record.
