= Swimming at the 2004 Summer Paralympics – Women's 200 metre individual medley SM7 =

Women's 200m Individual Medley SM7 at the XII Paralympic Games
- Paralympic Swimming
- Venue: Olympic Aquatic Centre
- Dates: 19 September 2004
- Competitors: 12 from 9 nations
- Winning time: 3:05.57

Medalists
1st place, gold medalist(s)		Erin Popovich	United States
2nd place, silver medalist(s)		Huang Min	China
3rd place, bronze medalist(s)		Chantel Wolfenden	Australia

The Women's 200 metre individual medley SM7 swimming event at the 2004 Summer Paralympics was competed on 19 September. It was won by Erin Popovich, representing United States.

== 1st round ==
Qualified for final round

Heat 1

19 Sept. 2004, morning session

Rank	Athlete	Time	Notes
1	Erin Popovich (USA)	3:09.42	PR
2	Oxana Guseva (RUS)	3:22.64	
3	Elisabeth Walker (CAN)	3:27.51	
4	Deborah Gruen (USA)	3:30.71	
5	Julie Crisp (USA)	3:37.92	
	Polina Dzhurova (BUL)	DSQ	

Heat 2

19 Sept. 2004, morning session

Rank	Athlete	Time	Notes
1	Chantel Wolfenden (AUS)	3:09.97	
2	Huang Min (CHN)	3:11.91	
3	Margita Prokeinova (SVK)	3:28.15	
4	Gitta Raczko (HUN)	3:36.07	
5	Stacey Williams (AUS)	3:40.17	
6	Montserrat Canals (ESP)	3:42.05	

== Final round ==
19 Sept. 2004, evening session

Rank	Athlete	Time	Notes
1st place, gold medalist(s)	Erin Popovich (USA)	3:05.57	WR
2nd place, silver medalist(s)	Huang Min (CHN)	3:05.84	
3rd place, bronze medalist(s)	Chantel Wolfenden (AUS)	3:10.46	
4	Oxana Guseva (RUS)	3:19.32	
5	Margita Prokeinova (SVK)	3:19.89	
6	Elisabeth Walker (CAN)	3:21.87	
7	Gitta Raczko (HUN)	3:30.02	
8	Deborah Gruen (USA)	3:32.96	
