= Swimming at the 2004 Summer Paralympics – Women's 400 metre freestyle S7 =

Women's 400m Freestyle S7 at the XII Paralympic Games
- Paralympic Swimming
- Venue: Olympic Aquatic Centre
- Dates: 23 September 2004
- Competitors: 14 from 12 nations
- Winning time: 5:20.26

Medalists
1st place, gold medalist(s)		Chantel Wolfenden	Australia
2nd place, silver medalist(s)		Oxana Guseva	Russia
3rd place, bronze medalist(s)		Danielle Campo	Canada

The Women's 400 metre freestyle S7 swimming event at the 2004 Summer Paralympics was competed on 23 September. It was won by Chantel Wolfenden, representing Australia.

== 1st round ==
Qualified for final round

Heat 1

23 September 2004, morning session

Rank	Athlete	Time	Notes
1	Kirsten Bruhn (GER)	5:35.04	
2	Oxana Guseva (RUS)	5:40.26	
3	Dacil Cabrera (ESP)	6:05.43	
4	Deborah Gruen (USA)	6:06.34	
5	Stacey Williams (AUS)	6:49.12	
6	Petra Hrabinova (CZE)	6:50.02	
7	Natasa Sobocan (CRO)	7:00.55	

Heat 2

23 September 2004, morning session

Rank	Athlete	Time	Notes
1	Chantel Wolfenden (AUS)	5:22.71	PR
2	Danielle Campo (CAN)	5:52.62	
3	Janine Schmid (AUT)	6:07.73	
4	Miyuki Yasuda (JPN)	6:13.36	
5	Elisabeth Walker (CAN)	6:24.38	
6	Velia Flores (MEX)	6:33.54	
7	Tamara Vaucher (SUI)	7:03.34	

== Final round ==
23 September 2004, evening session

Rank	Athlete	Time	Notes
1st place, gold medalist(s)	Chantel Wolfenden (AUS)	5:20.26	PR
2nd place, silver medalist(s)	Oxana Guseva (RUS)	5:32.10	
3rd place, bronze medalist(s)	Danielle Campo (CAN)	5:39.13	
4	Kirsten Bruhn (GER)	5:39.65	
5	Dacil Cabrera (ESP)	6:02.05	
6	Janine Schmid (AUT)	6:02.67	
7	Deborah Gruen (USA)	6:09.37	
8	Miyuki Yasuda (JPN)	6:18.23	
