= Swimming at the 2008 Summer Paralympics – Women's 50 metre butterfly S7 =

Women's 50m Butterfly S7 at the XIII Paralympic Games
- Venue: Beijing National Aquatics Center
- Dates: 13 September
- Competitors: 14 from 10 nations
- Winning time: 34.47

Medalists
1st place, gold medalist(s)		Huang Min	China
2nd place, silver medalist(s)		Erin Popovich	United States
3rd place, bronze medalist(s)		Veronica Almeida	Brazil

The women's 50m butterfly S7 event at the 2008 Summer Paralympics took place at the Beijing National Aquatics Center on 13 September. There were two heats; the swimmers with the eight fastest times advanced to the final.

== Results ==
=== Heats ===
Competed from 09:33.

==== Heat 1 ====
Rank	Name	Nationality	Time	Notes
1	Erin Popovich	United States	38.71	Q
2	Lalita Loureiro	Sweden	39.47	Q
3	Margita Prokeinova	Slovakia	41.88	Q
4	Cortney Jordan	United States	44.94	
5	Bernadette Massar	Netherlands	45.53	
6	Laura Jensen	Canada	48.07	
	Katrina Porter	Australia		DQ

==== Heat 2 ====
Rank	Name	Nationality	Time	Notes
1	Huang Min	China	34.60	Q, WR
2	Yang Tianshu	China	40.06	Q
3	Veronica Almeida	Brazil	40.19	Q
4	Shelley Rogers	Australia	41.35	Q
5	Oxana Guseva	Russia	42.28	Q
6	Gitta Raczko	Hungary	44.81	
7	Deborah Gruen	United States	49.19	

=== Final ===
Competed at 17:42.

Rank	Name	Nationality	Time	Notes
1st place, gold medalist(s)	Huang Min	China	34.47	WR
2nd place, silver medalist(s)	Erin Popovich	United States	37.87	
3rd place, bronze medalist(s)	Veronica Almeida	Brazil	38.49	
4	Lalita Loureiro	Sweden	38.55	
5	Yang Tianshu	China	39.91	
6	Shelley Rogers	Australia	40.02	
7	Margita Prokeinova	Slovakia	40.70	
8	Oxana Guseva	Russia	41.07	

Q = qualified for final. WR = World Record. DQ = Disqualified.
