= Swimming at the 2012 Summer Paralympics – Women's 4 × 100 metre medley relay 34pts =

Women's 4x100m Medley Relay 34 points at the XIV Paralympic Games
- Venue: London Aquatics Centre
- Dates: 7 September
- Competitors: 7
- Winning time: 4:53.95

Medalists
1st place, gold medalist(s)		Australia (AUS); Ellie Cole, Katherine Downie, Annabelle Williams, Jacqueline Freney
2nd place, silver medalist(s)		Great Britain (GBR); Heather Frederiksen, Claire Cashmore, Stephanie Millward, Louise Watkin
3rd place, bronze medalist(s)		United States (USA); Susan Beth Scott, Anna Johannes, Jessica Long, Mallory Weggemann

The women's 4 × 100 m medley relay 34 points event at the 2012 Summer Paralympics took place at the London Aquatics Centre on 7 September. There were no heats in this event.

== Results ==
=== Final ===
Competed at 20:47.

Rank	Lane	Nation	Swimmers	Time	Notes
1st place, gold medalist(s)	2	Australia	Ellie Cole; Katherine Downie; Annabelle Williams; Jacqueline Freney	4:53.95	OC
2nd place, silver medalist(s)	4	Great Britain	Heather Frederiksen; Claire Cashmore; Stephanie Millward; Louise Watkin	4:53.98	
3rd place, bronze medalist(s)	5	United States	Susan Beth Scott; Anna Johannes; Jessica Long; Mallory Weggemann	4:54.13	AM
4	3	Russia	Nina Ryabova; Olesya Vladykina; Irina Grazhdanova; Oxana Guseva	4:54.36	
5	6	Spain	Esther Morales; Sarai Gascón Moreno; Isabel Yinghua Hernandez Santos; Teresa Perales	5:06.04	
6	7	China	Jin Xiaoqin; Zhang Meng; Jiang Shengnan; Lin Ping	5:06.75	AS
7	1	Canada	Summer Ashley Mortimer; Katarina Roxon; Morgan Bird; Brianna Nelson	5:10.85	

AM = Americas Record. AS = Asian Record. OC = Oceania Record.
