= Swimming at the 2004 Summer Paralympics – Women's 100 metre freestyle S7 =

Women's 100m Freestyle S7 at the XII Paralympic Games
- Paralympic Swimming
- Venue: Olympic Aquatic Centre
- Dates: 20 September 2004
- Competitors: 16 from 15 nations
- Winning time: 1:14.61

Medalists
1st place, gold medalist(s)		Erin Popovich	United States
2nd place, silver medalist(s)		Chantel Wolfenden	Australia
3rd place, bronze medalist(s)		Kirsten Bruhn	Germany

The Women's 100 metre freestyle S7 swimming event at the 2004 Summer Paralympics was competed on 20 September. It was won by Erin Popovich, representing United States.

== 1st round ==
Qualified for final round

Heat 1

20 Sept. 2004, morning session

Rank	Athlete	Time	Notes
1	Erin Popovich (USA)	1:15.62	
2	Oxana Guseva (RUS)	1:18.41	
3	Danielle Campo (CAN)	1:18.51	
4	Hilde Saeves (NOR)	1:20.79	
5	Nathalie Suter (SUI)	1:21.68	
6	Dacil Cabrera (ESP)	1:24.61	
7	Margita Prokeinova (SVK)	1:28.55	
8	Polina Dzhurova (BUL)	1:37.22	

Heat 2

20 Sept. 2004, morning session

Rank	Athlete	Time	Notes
1	Kirsten Bruhn (GER)	1:15.41	
2	Chantel Wolfenden (AUS)	1:16.36	
3	Kristin Hakonardottir (ISL)	1:18.81	
4	Huang Min (CHN)	1:21.97	
5	Marlena Lewandowska (POL)	1:23.55	
6	Janine Schmid (AUT)	1:25.15	
7	Miyuki Yasuda (JPN)	1:26.13	
8	Deborah Gruen (USA)	1:29.30	

== Final round ==
20 Sept. 2004, evening session

Rank	Athlete	Time	Notes
1st place, gold medalist(s)	Erin Popovich (USA)	1:14.61	PR
2nd place, silver medalist(s)	Chantel Wolfenden (AUS)	1:15.09	
3rd place, bronze medalist(s)	Kirsten Bruhn (GER)	1:15.89	
4	Danielle Campo (CAN)	1:15.97	
5	Kristin Hakonardottir (ISL)	1:17.26	
6	Oxana Guseva (RUS)	1:17.68	
7	Hilde Saeves (NOR)	1:20.66	
8	Nathalie Suter (SUI)	1:21.42	
