= Swimming at the 2004 Summer Paralympics – Women's 100 metre backstroke S7 =

Women's 100m Backstroke S7 at the XII Paralympic Games
- Paralympic Swimming
- Venue: Olympic Aquatic Centre
- Dates: 22 September 2004
- Competitors: 10 from 10 nations
- Winning time: 1:25.56

Medalists
1st place, gold medalist(s)		Kristin Hakonardottir	Iceland
2nd place, silver medalist(s)		Kirsten Bruhn	Germany
3rd place, bronze medalist(s)		Chantel Wolfenden	Australia

The Women's 100 metre backstroke S7 swimming event at the 2004 Summer Paralympics was competed on 22 September. It was won by Kristin Hakonardottir, representing Iceland.

== 1st round ==
Qualified for final round

Heat 1

22 Sept. 2004, morning session

Rank	Athlete	Time	Notes
1	Chantel Wolfenden (AUS)	1:32.58	
2	Julie Crisp (USA)	1:33.49	
3	Janine Schmid (AUT)	1:35.11	
4	Marlena Lewandowska (POL)	1:36.42	
5	Margita Prokeinova (SVK)	1:41.49	

Heat 2

22 Sept. 2004, morning session

Rank	Athlete	Time	Notes
1	Kristin Hakonardottir (ISL)	1:28.50	
2	Kirsten Bruhn (GER)	1:31.68	
3	Elisabeth Walker (CAN)	1:35.23	
4	Nathalie Suter (SUI)	1:37.91	
5	Polina Dzhurova (BUL)	1:43.43	

== Final round ==
22 Sept. 2004, evening session

Rank	Athlete	Time	Notes
1st place, gold medalist(s)	Kristin Hakonardottir (ISL)	1:25.56	WR
2nd place, silver medalist(s)	Kirsten Bruhn (GER)	1:29.46	
3rd place, bronze medalist(s)	Chantel Wolfenden (AUS)	1:29.81	
4	Marlena Lewandowska (POL)	1:34.53	
5	Julie Crisp (USA)	1:34.96	
6	Janine Schmid (AUT)	1:34.96	
7	Elisabeth Walker (CAN)	1:35.16	
8	Nathalie Suter (SUI)	1:35.73	
