= Swimming at the 2008 Summer Paralympics – Women's 100 metre backstroke S7 =

Women's 100m Backstroke S7 at the XIII Paralympic Games
- Venue: Beijing National Aquatics Center
- Dates: 10 September
- Competitors: 10 from 8 nations
- Winning time: 1:24.30

Medalists
1st place, gold medalist(s)		Katrina Porter	Australia
2nd place, silver medalist(s)		Kirsten Bruhn	Germany
3rd place, bronze medalist(s)		Chantal Boonacker	Netherlands

The women's 100m backstroke S7 event at the 2008 Summer Paralympics took place at the Beijing National Aquatics Center on 10 September. There were two heats; the swimmers with the eight fastest times advanced to the final.

== Results ==
=== Heats ===
Competed from 09:33.

==== Heat 1 ====
Rank	Name	Nationality	Time	Notes
1	Katrina Porter	Australia	1:24.44	Q, WR
2	Cortney Jordan	United States	1:30.14	Q
3	Laura Jensen	Canada	1:34.12	Q
4	Kim Ji Eun	South Korea	1:35.28	Q
5	Natasa Sobocan	Croatia	1:46.48	

==== Heat 2 ====
Rank	Name	Nationality	Time	Notes
1	Kirsten Bruhn	Germany	1:26.54	Q
2	Chantal Boonacker	Netherlands	1:26.68	Q
3	Brianna Nelson	Canada	1:29.96	Q
4	Shelley Rogers	Australia	1:31.49	Q
5	Dorottya Baka	Hungary	1:40.14	

=== Final ===
Competed at 17:43.

Rank	Name	Nationality	Time	Notes
1st place, gold medalist(s)	Katrina Porter	Australia	1:24.30	WR
2nd place, silver medalist(s)	Kirsten Bruhn	Germany	1:25.97	
3rd place, bronze medalist(s)	Chantal Boonacker	Netherlands	1:26.30	
4	Cortney Jordan	United States	1:26.57	
5	Shelley Rogers	Australia	1:30.26	
6	Brianna Nelson	Canada	1:30.43	
7	Laura Jensen	Canada	1:31.90	
8	Kim Ji Eun	South Korea	1:34.31	

Q = qualified for final. WR = World Record.
