= Swimming at the 2004 Summer Paralympics – Women's 4 × 100 metre freestyle relay 34pts =

Women's 4x100m Freestyle 34 pts at the XII Paralympic Games
- Paralympic Swimming
- Venue: Olympic Aquatic Centre
- Dates: 22 September 2004
- Competitors: 8
- Winning time: 4:40.57

Medalists
1st place, gold medalist(s)		Ashley Owens; Erin Popovich; Jessica Long; Kelly Crowley	United States
2nd place, silver medalist(s)		Stephanie Dixon; Andrea Cole; Danielle Campo; Anne Cecile Polinario	Canada
3rd place, bronze medalist(s)		Kat Lewis; Lichelle Clarke; Chantel Wolfenden; Mandy Drennan	Australia

The Women's 4 x 100 metre freestyle relay 34pts swimming event at the 2004 Summer Paralympics was competed on 22 September. It was won by the team representing United States.

== Final round ==
22 Sept. 2004, evening session

Rank	Team	Time	Notes
1st place, gold medalist(s)	United States	4:40.57	
2nd place, silver medalist(s)	Canada	4:41.70	
3rd place, bronze medalist(s)	Australia	4:44.57	
4	Germany	4:49.50	
5	Poland	4:49.99	
6	Great Britain	4:54.38	
7	China	4:58.42	
8	Spain	5:49.84	

== Team Lists ==
United States; Ashley Owens; Erin Popovich; Jessica Long; Kelly Crowley	Canada; Stephanie Dixon; Andrea Cole; Danielle Campo; Anne Polinario	Australia; Kat Lewis; Lichelle Clarke; Chantel Wolfenden; Mandy Drennan	Germany; Claudia Hengst; Claudia Knoth; Christiane Reppe; Maria Götze
Poland; Katarzyna Pawlik; Marlena Lewandowska; Aneta Michalska; Beata Drozdowska	Great Britain; Jeanette Chippington; Lara Ferguson; Claire Cashmore; Sarah Bailey MBE	China; Qian Hui Yu; Huang Min; Zhou Zi Cun; Lu Weiyuan	Spain; Almudena de la Osa; Montserrat Canals; Dacil Cabrera; Vanesa Capo
