= Swimming at the 2012 Summer Paralympics – Women's 200 metre individual medley SM10 =

Women's 200m Ind. Medley SM10 at the XIV Paralympic Games
- Venue: London Aquatics Centre
- Dates: 30 August
- Competitors: 10 from 8 nations
- Winning time: 2:25.65

Medalists
1st place, gold medalist(s)		Sophie Pascoe	New Zealand
2nd place, silver medalist(s)		Summer Ashley Mortimer	Canada
3rd place, bronze medalist(s)		Zhang Meng	China

The women's 200m ind. medley SM10 event at the 2012 Summer Paralympics took place at the London Aquatics Centre on 30 August. There were two heats; the swimmers with the eight fastest times advanced to the final.

== Results ==
=== Heats ===
Competed from 11:24.

==== Heat 1 ====
Rank	Lane	Name	Nationality	Time	Notes
1	4	Summer Ashley Mortimer	Canada	2:34.44	Q
2	5	Katherine Downie	Australia	2:35.21	Q
3	3	Harriet Lee	Great Britain	2:38.06	Q
4	2	Isabel Yinghua Hernandez Santos	Spain	2:45.98	
5	6	Katarzyna Pawlik	Poland	2:49.31	

==== Heat 2 ====
Rank	Lane	Name	Nationality	Time	Notes
1	4	Sophie Pascoe	New Zealand	2:28.73	Q, WR
2	2	Zhang Meng	China	2:34.88	Q, AS
3	5	Nina Ryabova	Russia	2:36.04	Q
4	3	Gemma Almond	Great Britain	2:41.28	Q
5	6	Aurelie Rivard	Canada	2:42.44	Q

=== Final ===
Competed at 20:00.

Rank	Lane	Name	Nationality	Time	Notes
1st place, gold medalist(s)	4	Sophie Pascoe	New Zealand	2:25.65	WR
2nd place, silver medalist(s)	5	Summer Ashley Mortimer	Canada	2:32.08	
3rd place, bronze medalist(s)	3	Zhang Meng	China	2:33.95	AS
4	6	Katherine Downie	Australia	2:34.64	
5	2	Nina Ryabova	Russia	2:35.65	
6	8	Aurelie Rivard	Canada	2:37.70	
7	7	Harriet Lee	Great Britain	2:39.42	
8	1	Gemma Almond	Great Britain	2:42.16	

'Q = qualified for final. WR = World Record. AS = Asian Record.
