= Virginia McLachlan =

Canadian Paralympic sprinter

Personal information
- Nickname: Weezy
- Nationality: Canada
- Born: September 17, 1992 (age 33) Windsor, Ontario
- Height: 5 ft 1 in (155 cm)
Medal record
Women's para athletics
Representing Canada
Paralympic Games
Bronze medal – third place	2012 London	100 metre T35
Bronze medal – third place	2012 London	200 metre T35
World Championships
Silver medal – second place	2013 Lyon	100m T35
Silver medal – second place	2013 Lyon	200m T35
Parapan American Games
Silver medal – second place	2011 Guadalajara	100 metre T35
Silver medal – second place	2011 Guadalajara	200 metre T35

Virginia McLachlan (born September 17, 1992) is a Canadian Paralympic sprinter who won 2 bronze medals in women's T35 200 m and 100 m run at the 2012 Summer Paralympics. She also won 2 silver medals at 2011 Parapan American Games in Guadalajara, Mexico and 2 more silvers at the 2013 IPC Athletics World Championships in Lyon France for the same distances. Currently she attends University of Windsor.
