= Danielle Campo =

Canadian Paralympic swimmer (born 1985)

Personal information
- Full name: Danielle Campo
- Nationality: Canadian
- Born: January 4, 1985 (age 41)
- Height: 5 ft 3 in (1.60 m)
- Weight: 99 lb (45 kg)

Sport
- Sport: Swimming
- Strokes: butterfly, freestyle
Medal record
Paralympics
Gold medal – first place	2000 Sydney	50 m freestyle S7
Gold medal – first place	2000 Sydney	100 m freestyle S7
Gold medal – first place	2000 Sydney	4×100 m freestyle 34pts
Silver medal – second place	2000 Sydney	400 m freestyle S7
Silver medal – second place	2004 Athens	4×100 m freestyle 34pts
Bronze medal – third place	2004 Athens	50 m freestyle S7
Bronze medal – third place	2004 Athens	400 m freestyle S7
IPC World Championships
Gold medal – first place	2002 Mar del Plata	50 m freestyle S7
Gold medal – first place	2002 Mar del Plata	100 m freestyle S7
Silver medal – second place	2002 Mar del Plata	400 m freestyle S7
Commonwealth Games
Bronze medal – third place	2002 Manchester	50 m EAD freestyle
- Updated on January 18, 2014

Danielle Campo, OOnt, (born January 4, 1985) is a Canadian Paralympic swimmer.

== Career ==
Campo first competed for Canada at the 2000 Summer Paralympics in Sydney, where she won gold in the 100 metre freestyle S7 in a world record time of 1:14.64, gold in the 50 metre freestyle S7 in a Paralympic record time of 34.98, silver in the 400 metre freestyle S7 in 5:35.08 and with Jessica Sloan, Andrea Cole and Stéphanie Dixon won gold in the 4×100 metre freestyle 34pts in a world record time of 4:38.01.

At the 2002 Commonwealth Games in Manchester, Campo won bronze in the 50 metre EAD freestyle. Competing against swimmers in other classifications, Campo covered the distance in a Games record time of 35.02, 0.04 seconds over her target time.

At the 2002 IPC World Championships in Mar del Plata, Argentina, Campo won gold in the 50 metre freestyle S7 in 34.77, gold in the 100 metre freestyle S7 in 1:15.88 and silver in the 400 metre freestyle S7 in 5:46.16.

At the 2004 Summer Paralympics in Athens, Campo won bronze in the 50 metre freestyle S7 in 35.17, bronze in the 400 metre freestyle S7 in 5:39.13, finished 4th in the 100 metre freestyle S7 in 1:15.97, finished 11th in the 50 metre butterfly S7 in 48.56 and with Dixon, Cole and Anne Polinario won silver in the 4×100 metre freestyle 34pts in 4:41.70.

== Honours ==
For her sporting success, Campo was awarded the Queen Elizabeth II Golden Jubilee Medal in 1992, the Queen Elizabeth II Diamond Jubilee Medal in 2012 and in 2001 became a member of the Order of Ontario.
