= Canada at the 2012 Summer Paralympics =

- Flag of Canada
- IPC code: CAN
- NPC: Canadian Paralympic Committee
- Website: www.paralympic.ca

in London
- Competitors: 145 in 15 sports
- Flag bearers: Garett Hickling (opening); Benoît Huot (closing)
- Medals Ranked 20th: Gold 7 Silver 15 Bronze 9 Total 31

Summer Paralympics appearances (overview)
- 1968; 1972; 1976; 1980; 1984; 1988; 1992; 1996; 2000; 2004; 2008; 2012; 2016; 2020; 2024

Canada competed at the 2012 Summer Paralympics in London, United Kingdom, from 29 August to 9 September 2012. A total of 145 athletes were sent by the Canadian Paralympic Committee to compete in 15 sports. The country won 31 medals in total and finished twentieth in the medals table, below the CPC's goal on a top eight finish in total gold medals. The total medals and total golds are the lowest totals for Canada since the 1972 Games.

== Medallists ==
Medals by discipline
Discipline	Gold medal	Silver medal	Bronze medal	Total
Athletics	1	5	3	9
Archery	0	0	1	1
Boccia	0	0	1	1
Cycling	1	0	1	2
Goalball	0	0	0	0
Judo	0	0	0	0
Rowing	0	0	0	0
Sailing	0	0	0	0
Shooting	0	0	0	0
Swimming	4	9	3	16
Wheelchair basketball	1	0	0	1
Wheelchair fencing	0	0	0	0
Wheelchair rugby	0	1	0	1
Wheelchair tennis	0	0	0	0
Total	7	15	9	31

Medal	Name	Sport	Event	Date
Gold	Benoît Huot	Swimming	Men's 200 m individual medley SM10	30 August
Gold	Summer Mortimer	Swimming	Women's 50 m freestyle S10	31 August
Gold	Michelle Stilwell	Athletics	Women's 200 m T52	1 September
Gold	Summer Mortimer	Swimming	Women's 100 m backstroke S10	4 September
Gold	Valérie Grand'Maison	Swimming	Women's 200 m individual medley SM13	7 September
Gold	Robbi Weldon; Pilot: Lyne Bessette	Cycling	Women's road race B	8 September
Gold	Canada men's national wheelchair basketball team: Patrick Anderson; Abdi Dini; Dave Durepos; David Eng; Bo Hedges; Chad Jassman; Joey Johnson; Adam Lancia; Tyler Miller; Richard Peter; Yvon Rouillard; Brandon Wagner	Wheelchair basketball	Men's tournament	8 September
Silver	Summer Mortimer	Swimming	Women's 200 m individual medley SM10	30 August
Silver	Brianna Nelson	Swimming	Women's 50 m butterfly S7	31 August
Silver	Nathan Stein	Swimming	Men's 50 m freestyle S10	31 August
Silver	Valérie Grand'Maison	Swimming	Women's 50 m freestyle S13	1 September
Silver	Brianna Nelson	Swimming	Women's 200 m individual medley SM7	2 September
Silver	Brent Lakatos	Athletics	Men's 400 m T53	2 September
Silver	Valérie Grand'Maison	Swimming	Women's 100 m freestyle S13	2 September
Silver	Benoît Huot	Swimming	Men's 400 m freestyle S10	5 September
Silver	Aurelie Rivard	Swimming	Women's 400 m freestyle S10	5 September
Silver	Brent Lakatos	Athletics	Men's 800 m T53	5 September
Silver	Michelle Stilwell	Athletics	Women's 100 m T52	5 September
Silver	Amber Thomas	Swimming	Women's 400 m freestyle S11	7 September
Silver	Jason Dunkerley; Guide: Josh Karanja	Athletics	Men's 5000 m T11	7 September
Silver	Brent Lakatos	Athletics	Men's 200 m T53	7 September
Silver	Canada men's national wheelchair rugby team: Ian Chan; Jason Crone; Patrice Dagenais; Jared Funk; Garett Hickling; Trevor Hirschfield; Fabien Lavoie; Zak Madell; Travis Murao; Patrice Simard; Mike Whitehead; David Willsie	Wheelchair rugby	Men's tournament	9 September
Bronze	Virginia McLachlan	Athletics	Women's 200 m T35	31 August
Bronze	Norbert Murphy	Archery	Men's individual compound W1	3 September
Bronze	Jason Dunkerley; Guide: Josh Karanja	Athletics	Men's 1500 m T11	3 September
Bronze	Marco Dispaltro; Josh Vander Vies	Boccia	Mixed pairs BC4	4 September
Bronze	Benoît Huot	Swimming	Men's 100 m backstroke S10	4 September
Bronze	Marie-Claude Molnar	Cycling	Women's individual time trial C4	5 September
Bronze	Summer Mortimer	Swimming	Women's 100 m freestyle S10	6 September
Bronze	Virginia McLachlan	Athletics	Women's 100 m T35	7 September
Bronze	Amber Thomas	Swimming	Women's 200 m individual medley SM11	8 September

== Archery ==
Men

Athlete	Event	Ranking round		Round of 32	Round of 16	Quarterfinals	Semifinals	Finals	
Athlete	Event	Score	Seed	Opposition score	Opposition score	Opposition score	Opposition score	Opposition score	Rank
Norbert Murphy	Individual compound W1	623	6	—N/a	Saito (JPN); W 6–2	Kinik (SVK); W 6–0	Fabry (USA); L 7–3	Kinnunen (FIN); W 6–1	3rd place, bronze medalist(s)
Kevin Evans	Individual compound open	626	25	Horner (SUI); W 6–4	Denton (USA); L 6–4	did not advance			
Bob Hudson	Individual compound open	629	23	Kantczak (POL); L 6–0	did not advance				

Women

Athlete	Event	Ranking round		Round of 32	Round of 16	Quarterfinals	Semifinals	Finals	
Athlete	Event	Score	Seed	Opposition score	Opposition score	Opposition score	Opposition score	Opposition score	Rank
Karen van Nest	Individual compound open	643	6	—N/a	Nagano (JPN); L 6–5	did not advance			
Lyne Tremblay	Individual recurve W1/W2	423	20	Bayar (TUR); L 6–0	did not advance				

== Athletics ==
=== Men's track ===
Athlete	Event	Heats		Final	
Athlete	Event	Result	Rank	Result	Rank
Josh Cassidy	800m T54	1:38.24	4 q	1:39.72	5
Josh Cassidy	1500m T54	3:19.54	3 Q	3:14.70	10
Josh Cassidy	5000m T54	11:32.47	4	did not advance	
Josh Cassidy	Marathon T54	—N/a		1:33:06	12
Earle Connor	100m T42	12.56	2 Q	12.65	4
Nathan Dewitt	100m T34	17.35	4 q	17.36	8
Nathan Dewitt	200m T34	31.30	6	did not advance	
Braedon Samuel Dolfo	100m T13	11.26	4 q	11.27	7
Braedon Samuel Dolfo	200m T13	23.25	4	did not advance	
Jonathan Dunkerley	400m T11	55.27	3	did not advance	
Jason Dunkerley	1500m T11	—N/a		4:07.56	3rd place, bronze medalist(s)
Jason Dunkerley	5000m T11	—N/a		15:34.07	2nd place, silver medalist(s)
Alexandre Dupont	400m T54	51.17	4	did not advance	
Alexandre Dupont	800m T54	1:39.73	6	did not advance	
Alexandre Dupont	5000m T54	11:31.10	9	did not advance	
Michel Filteau	Marathon T54	—N/a		1:47:39	26
Eric Gauthier	200m T53	28.26	5	did not advance	
Eric Gauthier	400m T53	53.56	4	did not advance	
Brandon King	200m T12	24.29	4	did not advance	
Brent Lakatos	100m T53	15.00	1 Q	15.31	5
Brent Lakatos	200m T53	26.20	2 Q	25.85	2nd place, silver medalist(s)
Brent Lakatos	400m T53	49.46	1 Q	50.17	2nd place, silver medalist(s)
Brent Lakatos	800m T53	1:42.22	3 Q	1:41.24	2nd place, silver medalist(s)
Colin Mathieson	100m T54	15.25	6	did not advance	
Colin Mathieson	400m T54	51.95	6	did not advance	
Alister McQueen	100m T44	12.02	3	did not advance	
Alister McQueen	200m T44	24.25	3	did not advance	
Curtis Thom	100m T54	14.47	3 q	14.74	6
Curtis Thom	400m T54	48.57	5	did not advance	
Dustin Walsh	400m T11	DQ		did not advance	

=== Men's field ===
Athlete	Event	Final	
Athlete	Event	Result	Rank
Alister McQueen	Javelin throw F44	49.32	7
Kyle Pettey	Shot put F34	11.41	6

=== Women's track ===
Athlete	Event	Heats		Final	
Athlete	Event	Result	Rank	Result	Rank
Rachael Burrows	100m T34	22.02	2 Q	22.59	8
Rachael Burrows	200m T34	39.59	3 Q	38.51	6
Keira-Lyn Frie	100m T54	17.54	3 Q	17.26	6
Keira-Lyn Frie	800m T54	1:57.23	4	did not advance	
Keira-Lyn Frie	1500m T54	3:42.59	4 Q	3:38.58	8
Keira-Lyn Frie	5000m T54	13:12.45	4 Q	12:28.86	4
Virginia McLachlan	100m T35	—N/a		16.42	3rd place, bronze medalist(s)
Virginia McLachlan	200m T35	—N/a		34.31	2nd place, silver medalist(s)
Leah Robinson	400m T37	1:16.94	5	did not advance	
Diane Roy	400m T54	57.11	2 Q	56.60	5
Diane Roy	800m T54	1:55.95	3 Q	1:54.90	6
Diane Roy	1500m T54	3:32.27	4 Q	3:37.17	4
Diane Roy	5000m T54	12:24.48	2 Q	12:29.27	9
Diane Roy	Marathon T54	—N/a		1:53:02	7
Michelle Stilwell	100m T52	—N/a		19.80	2nd place, silver medalist(s)
Michelle Stilwell	200m T52	—N/a		33.80	1st place, gold medalist(s)

== Boccia ==
Individual

Athlete	Event	Seeding matches	Round of 32	Round of 16	Quarterfinals	Semifinals	Final / BM	
Athlete	Event	Opposition Score	Opposition Score	Opposition Score	Opposition Score	Opposition Score	Opposition Score	Rank
Brock Richardson	Mixed individual BC1	Bye	Shibayama (JPN); L 0-5	did not advance				
Adam Dukovich	Mixed individual BC2	Bye	Robinson (GBR); W 5–5	Santos (BRA); L 3-9	did not advance			
Dave Richer	Mixed individual BC2	Bye	Yeung (HKG); L 2-3	did not advance				
Paul Gauthier	Mixed individual BC3	Bye	Hanson (USA); W 7-1	Macedo (POR); L 5-7	did not advance			
Monica Martino	Mixed individual BC3	Bye	Taha (SIN); L 2-5	did not advance				
Marco Dispaltro	Mixed individual BC4	Bye	—N/a	McGuire (GBR); L 3-4	did not advance			
Josh Vander Vies	Mixed individual BC4	Bye	—N/a	Santos (BRA); L 1-8	did not advance			

Pairs and teams

Athlete	Event	Pool matches		Quarterfinals	Semifinals	Final / BM	
Athlete	Event	Opposition Score	Rank	Opposition Score	Opposition Score	Opposition Score	Rank
Adam Dukovich; Tammy Mcleod; Brock Richardson; Dave Richer	Mixed team BC1-2	Thailand (THA); L 0-22; China (CHN); L 5-5	3	did not advance			
Bruno Garneau; Paul Gauthier; Monica Martino	Mixed pairs BC3	South Korea (KOR); W 5-4; Greece (GRE); L 2–3; Great Britain (GBR); L 1-9	4	—N/a	did not advance		
Marco Dispaltro; Josh Vander Vies	Mixed pairs BC4	Thailand (THA); W 6-1; Great Britain (GBR); W 4-1; Slovakia (SVK); W 4-3	1	—N/a	Czech Republic (CZE); L 5-5	Great Britain (GBR); W 8-2	3rd place, bronze medalist(s)

== Cycling ==
=== Road ===
Athlete	Event	Time	Rank
Daniel Chalifour (Alexandre Cloutier - pilot)	Men's road race B	2:29:47	9
Daniel Chalifour (Alexandre Cloutier - pilot)	Men's time trial B	31:35.68	4
Brayden McDougall	Men's road race C1–3	DNF	
Brayden McDougall	Men's time trial C1	28:17.49	7
Jaye Milley	Men's road race C1–3	LAP	27
Jaye Milley	Men's time trial C1	29:25.57	9
Arnold Boldt	Men's road race C1–3	DNF	
Arnold Boldt	Men's time trial C2	27:31.82	12
Robert Labbe	Men's road race H1	1:59:44	6
Robert Labbe	Men's time trial H1	44:47.70	10
Mark Beggs	Men's road race H2	1:52:12	10
Mark Beggs	Men's time trial H2	31:11.80	11
Mark Ledo	Men's road race H3	DNF	
Mark Ledo	Men's time trial H3	28:39.64	9
Genevieve Ouellet (Emilie Roy – pilot)	Women's road race B	2:12:56	4
Genevieve Ouellet (Emilie Roy – pilot)	Women's time trial B	36:46.14	8
Robbi Weldon (Lyne Bessette – pilot)	Women's road race B	2:08:26	1st place, gold medalist(s)
Robbi Weldon (Lyne Bessette – pilot)	Women's time trial B	35:47.94	4
Marie-Claude Molnar	Women's road race C4-5	1:58:44	13
Marie-Claude Molnar	Women's time trial C4	26:48.52	3rd place, bronze medalist(s)
Marie-Ève Croteau	Mixed road race T1-2	DNS	
Marie-Ève Croteau	Mixed time trial T1-2	DNS	
Shelley Gautier	Mixed road race T1-2	LAP	14
Shelley Gautier	Mixed time trial T1-2	16:50.61	11
Robert Labbe; Mark Ledo; Mark Beggs	Mixed team relay	34:07	5

=== Track ===
Athlete	Event	Qualification		Final	
Athlete	Event	Time	Rank	Opposition Time	Rank
Daniel Chalifour (Jean-Michel Lachance - pilot)	Men's individual pursuit B	4:28.648	7	did not advance	
Daniel Chalifour (Jean-Michel Lachance - pilot)	Men's 1 km time trial B	—N/a		1:05.433	8
Brayden McDougall	Men's individual pursuit C1	DSQ		did not advance	
Brayden McDougall	Men's 1 km time trial C1–3	—N/a		1:12.683	12
Jaye Milley	Men's individual pursuit C1	4:24.673	7	did not advance	
Jaye Milley	Men's 1 km time trial C1–3	—N/a		1:17.631	26
Arnold Boldt	Men's individual pursuit C2	4:13.458	12	did not advance	
Arnold Boldt	Men's 1 km time trial C1–3	—N/a		1:17.304	25
Robbi Weldon (Lyne Bessette – pilot)	Women's individual pursuit B	3:45.698	7	did not advance	
Marie-Claude Molnar	Women's individual pursuit C4	4:11.678	4 Q	Green (AUS); L 4:12.398	4
Marie-Claude Molnar	Women's 500 m time trial C4–5	—N/a		42.228	10

== Goalball ==
=== Men's tournament ===
Group B

Team	Pld	W	D	L	GF	GA	GD	Pts	Qualification
Iran	5	4	0	1	32	20	+12	12	Quarterfinals
China	5	3	1	1	20	14	+6	10	Quarterfinals
Belgium	5	3	1	1	19	16	+3	10	Quarterfinals
Algeria	5	2	0	3	18	17	+1	6	Quarterfinals
South Korea	5	1	0	4	18	28	−10	3	Eliminated
Canada	5	1	0	4	16	28	−12	3	Eliminated

Source: "London 2012 Paralympic Games - Goalball results" (PDF). Paralympic.org. 2012-10-03 – via Goalball.sport.

30 August 2012; 16:15	Canada	2 – 4	Belgium	Copper Box, London; Referees: Thomas Baerz (GER) Shinji Mizuno (JPN)
30 August 2012; 16:15	Caron 2	Report	de Rick 2 Vanhove 1 Bihi 1	Copper Box, London; Referees: Thomas Baerz (GER) Shinji Mizuno (JPN)

31 August 2012; 19:45	Iran	9 – 2	Canada	Copper Box, London; Referees: Dina Murdie (GBR), Tony Connolly (USA)
31 August 2012; 19:45	Jafari 4 Sayahi 3 Shahbazi 1 Shirdel 1	Report	Gaulin 2	Copper Box, London; Referees: Dina Murdie (GBR), Tony Connolly (USA)

1 September 2012; 16:15	Canada	5 – 4	South Korea	Copper Box, London; Referees: Kimberly Anderson (USA), Shinji Mizuno (JPN)
1 September 2012; 16:15	Gaulin 3 Caron 2	Report	C-H Kim 2 Hong 1 J-W Oh 1	Copper Box, London; Referees: Kimberly Anderson (USA), Shinji Mizuno (JPN)

2 September 2012; 16:15	Canada	6 – 8	Algeria	Copper Box, London; Referees: Vilma Venckutonyte (LTU), Yasser Omar (EGY)
2 September 2012; 16:15	Caron 4 Gaulin 2	Report	Mokrane 8	Copper Box, London; Referees: Vilma Venckutonyte (LTU), Yasser Omar (EGY)

3 September 2012; 11:30	China	3 – 1	Canada	Copper Box, London; Referees: Ali Aldarsony (KSA), Christl Daentler (GER)
3 September 2012; 11:30	Chen 2 Yao 1	Report	Gaulin 1	Copper Box, London; Referees: Ali Aldarsony (KSA), Christl Daentler (GER)

=== Women's tournament ===
Group D

Team	Pld	W	D	L	GF	GA	GD	Pts	Qualification
Canada	4	3	0	1	6	3	+3	9	Quarterfinals
Japan	4	2	1	1	5	3	+2	7	Quarterfinals
Sweden	4	2	1	1	11	11	0	7	Quarterfinals
United States	4	2	0	2	9	4	+5	6	Quarterfinals
Australia	4	0	0	4	7	17	−10	0	Eliminated

Source: "London 2012 Paralympic Games - Goalball results" (PDF). Paralympic.org. 2012-10-03 – via Goalball.sport.

1 September 2012; 13:45	Canada	1 – 2	Sweden	Copper Box, London; Referees: Bulent Kimyor (TUR), Thomas Bärz (GER)
1 September 2012; 13:45	Kneebone 1	Report	Gustavsson 2	Copper Box, London; Referees: Bulent Kimyor (TUR), Thomas Bärz (GER)

2 September 2012; 10:15	Australia	1 – 3	Canada	Copper Box, London; Referees: Juha Vuokila (FIN), Dina Murdie (GBR)
2 September 2012; 10:15	Christensen 1	Report	Kneebone 2 Morin 1	Copper Box, London; Referees: Juha Vuokila (FIN), Dina Murdie (GBR)

3 September 2012; 19:45	Japan	0 – 1	Canada	Copper Box, London

4 September 2012; 13:45	Canada	1 – 0	United States	Copper Box, London

Quarter-final

5 September 2012; 14:15	Canada	1 – 2	Finland	Copper Box, London

== Judo ==
Athlete	Event	Preliminaries	Quarterfinals	Semifinals	Repechage First round	Repechage Final	Final / BM	
Athlete	Event	Opposition Result	Opposition Result	Opposition Result	Opposition Result	Opposition Result	Opposition Result	Rank
Justin Karn	Men's –60 kg	Hirai (JPN); L 000–0100	did not advance		Castellanos Cortes (COL); W 0101–000	Lee (KOR); L 000–0100	did not advance	
Timothy Rees	Men's –100 kg	Ingram (GBR); L 0000-0111	did not advance					
Tony Walby	Men's +100 kg	Taurines (FRA); W 0100-0000	Domínguez (CUB); L 0000-0101	did not advance	Bye	Zakiyev (AZE); L 0000–0100	did not advance	

== Rowing ==
Athlete(s)	Event	Heats		Repechage		Final	
Athlete(s)	Event	Time	Rank	Time	Rank	Time	Rank
Joan Reid	Women's single sculls	5:43.52	3 R	5:49.77	2 FA	5:55.92	6
David Blair; Kristen Kit; Meghan Montgomery; Victoria Nolan; Anthony Theriault	Mixed coxed four	3:29.69	3 R	3:28.82	3 FB	3:31.17	1

Qualification legend: FA=Final A (medal); FB=Final B (non-medal); R=Repechage

== Sailing ==
Athlete	Event	Race											Total points	Net points	Rank
Athlete	Event	1	2	3	4	5	6	7	8	9	10	11	Total points	Net points	Rank
Paul Tingley	2.4 mR – 1 person keelboat	6	7	2	(10)	9	6	2	2	9	4	CAN	57	47	5
Stacie Louttit; John McRoberts	SKUD 18 – 2 person keelboat	4	3	3	4	(12); OCS	4	3	3	6	4	CAN	46	34	4
Logan Campbell; Scott Lutes; Bruce Millar	Sonar – 3 person keelboat	5	9	10	7	6	7	9	8	(12)	11	CAN	81	68	10

== Shooting ==
Athlete	Event	Qualification		Final	
Athlete	Event	Score	Rank	Score	Rank
Doug Blessin	Mixed R4–10 m air rifle standing SH2	590	24	did not advance	
Doug Blessin	Mixed R5–10 m air rifle prone SH2	595	25	did not advance	
Christos Trifonidis	Mixed R3–10 m air rifle prone SH1	596	26	did not advance	
Christos Trifonidis	Mixed R6–50 m rifle prone SH1	573	41	did not advance	

== Swimming ==
Men

Athlete	Event	Heats		Final	
Athlete	Event	Result	Rank	Result	Rank
Isaac Bouckley	50m freestyle S10	26.06	5	did not advance	
Isaac Bouckley	100m freestyle S10	56.29	5	did not advance	
Isaac Bouckley	400m freestyle S10	4:16.97	1 Q	4:18.53	8
Isaac Bouckley	100m backstroke S10	1:06.74	5	did not advance	
Isaac Bouckley	100m breaststroke SB9	1:15.99	5	did not advance	
Isaac Bouckley	100m butterfly S10	1:03.42	6	did not advance	
Isaac Bouckley	200m individual medley SM10	2:18.33	6 Q	DSQ	
Devin Gotell	100m freestyle S13	57.75	7	did not advance	
Devin Gotell	400m freestyle S13	4:23.84	3 Q	4:20.43	7
Devin Gotell	100m backstroke S13	1:06.62	6	did not advance	
Devin Gotell	200m individual medley SM13	2:27.88	6	did not advance	
Michael Heath	200m freestyle S14	2:09.85	5	did not advance	
Michael Heath	100m backstroke S14	1:08.42	5	did not advance	
Michael Heath	100m breaststroke SB14	1:16.09	6	did not advance	
Brian Hill	100m backstroke S13	1:04.93	4 Q	1:04.97	7
Brian Hill	100m butterfly S13	1:01.61	4	did not advance	
Benoît Huot	100m freestyle S10	54.46	1 Q	53.32	4
Benoît Huot	400m freestyle S10	4:15.22	2 Q	4:06.58	2nd place, silver medalist(s)
Benoît Huot	100m backstroke S10	1:02.22	1 Q	1:00.73	3rd place, bronze medalist(s)
Benoît Huot	200m individual medley SM10	2:13.87	1 Q	2:10.01 WR	1st place, gold medalist(s)
Zack Mcallister	50m freestyle S8	29.29	8	did not advance	
Zack Mcallister	100m freestyle S8	1:02.88 AM	5 Q	did not advance	
Zack Mcallister	400m freestyle S8	4:43.80	4 Q	4:39.81 AM	6
Zack Mcallister	200m individual medley SM8	2:40.05	4	did not advance	
Scott Patterson	100m breaststroke SB5	1:49.89	5 Q	1:50.21	8
Nathan Stein	50m freestyle S10	23.89	1 Q	23.58	2nd place, silver medalist(s)
Nathan Stein	100m freestyle S10	54.23	2 Q	53.59	5
Nathan Stein	100m breaststroke SB9	DNS		did not advance	
Nathan Stein	100m butterfly S10	59.81	3	did not advance	
Donovan Tildesley	100m freestyle S11	1:02.64	4 Q	1:02.06	7
Donovan Tildesley	100m backstroke S11	1:13.17	4 Q	1:13.97	8
Donovan Tildesley	100m butterfly S11	1:08.76	4 Q	1:07.96	8
Donovan Tildesley	200m individual medley SM11	2:30.65	2 Q	2:30.22	7

Women

Athlete	Event	Heats		Final	
Athlete	Event	Result	Rank	Result	Rank
Camille Bérubé	100m freestyle S8	1:18.31	5	did not advance	
Camille Bérubé	400m freestyle S8	5:39.14	5	did not advance	
Camille Bérubé	100m backstroke S8	1:26.96	6	did not advance	
Camille Bérubé	100m butterfly S8	1:39.53	8	did not advance	
Camille Bérubé	200m individual medley SM8	3:20.68	5	did not advance	
Morgan Bird	50m freestyle S8	32.67	8 Q	32.70	8
Morgan Bird	100m freestyle S8	1:11.16	2 Q	1:10.97	6
Morgan Bird	400m freestyle S8	5:19.15	2 Q	5:18.35	4
Morgan Bird	100m butterfly S8	1:21.58	4	did not advance	
Valerie Drapeau	200m freestyle S5	4:56.32	7	did not advance	
Valerie Drapeau	100m breaststroke S5	2:07.70	6	did not advance	
Valerie Grand-Maison	50m freestyle S13	28.33	3 Q	27.91	2nd place, silver medalist(s)
Valerie Grand-Maison	100m freestyle S13	1:00.48	1 Q	1:00.07	2nd place, silver medalist(s)
Valerie Grand-Maison	100m breaststroke SB13	1:25.03	3 Q	1:22.16	6
Valerie Grand-Maison	200m individual medley SM13	2:33.26	1 Q	2:27.64 WR	1st place, gold medalist(s)
Brianna Jennett-McNeil	50m freestyle S10	30.24	13	did not advance	
Brianna Jennett-McNeil	100m freestyle S10	1:05.09	5	did not advance	
Brianna Jennett-McNeil	400m freestyle S10	5:01.94	5	did not advance	
Brianna Jennett-McNeil	100m butterfly S10	1:20.53	5	did not advance	
Kirstie Kasko	200m freestyle S14	2:27.25	4	did not advance	
Kirstie Kasko	100m backstroke S14	1:19.84	4	did not advance	
Kirstie Kasko	100m breaststroke SB14	1:27.90	5	did not advance	
Sarah Mailhot	100m freestyle S8	1:25.80	7	did not advance	
Sarah Mailhot	400m freestyle S8	5:54.67	7	did not advance	
Sarah Mailhot	100m backstroke S8	DNS		did not advance	
Sarah Mehain	50m freestyle S7	35.66	7 Q	35.42	7
Sarah Mehain	100m freestyle S7	1:21.69	5	did not advance	
Sarah Mehain	100m backstroke S7	1:31.07	5	did not advance	
Sarah Mehain	100m breaststroke SB7	1:48.90	2 Q	1:47.29	4
Sarah Mehain	50m butterfly S7	39.44	3 Q	39.93	8
Sarah Mehain	200m individual medley SM7	3:16.08	5 Q	3:12.06	7
Summer Mortimer	50m freestyle S10	28.21	1 Q	28.10 WR	1st place, gold medalist(s)
Summer Mortimer	100m freestyle S10	1:01.98	1 Q	1:01.58	3rd place, bronze medalist(s)
Summer Mortimer	100m backstroke S10	1:09.92	2 Q	1:05.90 WR	1st place, gold medalist(s)
Summer Mortimer	200m individual medley SM10	2:34.44	1 Q	2:32.08	2nd place, silver medalist(s)
Jana Murphy	200m freestyle S14	2:26.44	5	did not advance	
Jana Murphy	100m backstroke S14	DNS		did not advance	
Jana Murphy	100m breaststroke SB14	1:30.89	6	did not advance	
Brianna Nelson	50m freestyle S7	35.43	6 Q	35.32	6
Brianna Nelson	100m breaststroke SB14	1:30.89	6	did not advance	
Brianna Nelson	100m freestyle S7	1:18.01	4 Q	1:17.77	7
Brianna Nelson	100m backstroke S7	1:29.30	4 Q	1:30.17	8
Brianna Nelson	100m breaststroke SB7	1:54.01	4 Q	1:54.19	8
Brianna Nelson	50m butterfly S7	36.87	2 Q	36.03	2nd place, silver medalist(s)
Brianna Nelson	200m individual medley SM7	3:05.88	2 Q	3:04.60	2nd place, silver medalist(s)
Aurélie Rivard	50m freestyle S10	29.29	6 Q	28.98	6
Aurélie Rivard	100m freestyle S10	1:03.27	3 Q	1:02.12	4
Aurélie Rivard	400m freestyle S10	4:45.06	2 Q	4:36.46	2nd place, silver medalist(s)
Aurélie Rivard	100m backstroke S10	1:12.70	4 Q	1:11.92	5
Aurélie Rivard	100m breaststroke SB9	1:28.54	7	did not advance	
Aurélie Rivard	200m individual medley SM10	2:42.44	5 Q	2:37.70	6
Katarina Roxon	50m freestyle S9	31.78	12	did not advance	
Katarina Roxon	100m freestyle S9	1:08.58	7	did not advance	
Katarina Roxon	400m freestyle S9	5:17.03	5	did not advance	
Katarina Roxon	100m butterfly S9	1:18.61	6	did not advance	
Katarina Roxon	200m individual medley SM9	2:51.27	5	did not advance	
Rhea Schmidt	50m freestyle S13	30.07	9	did not advance	
Rhea Schmidt	100m freestyle S13	1:05.35	5 Q	1:05.26	8
Rhea Schmidt	100m breaststroke SB13	1:28.57	6	did not advance	
Rhea Schmidt	200m individual medley SM13	2:47.67	6	did not advance	
Amber Thomas	400m freestyle S11	5:14.42 AM	2 Q	5:15.48	2nd place, silver medalist(s)
Amber Thomas	200m individual medley SM11	2:58.76 PR	1 Q	2:59.00	3rd place, bronze medalist(s)
Katarina Roxon; Brianna Nelson; Morgan Bird; Summer Mortimer	4 × 100 m freestyle relay 34pts	—N/a		4:38.23	7
Summer Mortimer; Katarina Roxon; Morgan Bird; Brianna Nelson	4 × 100 m medley relay 34pts	—N/a		5:10.85	7

== Wheelchair basketball ==
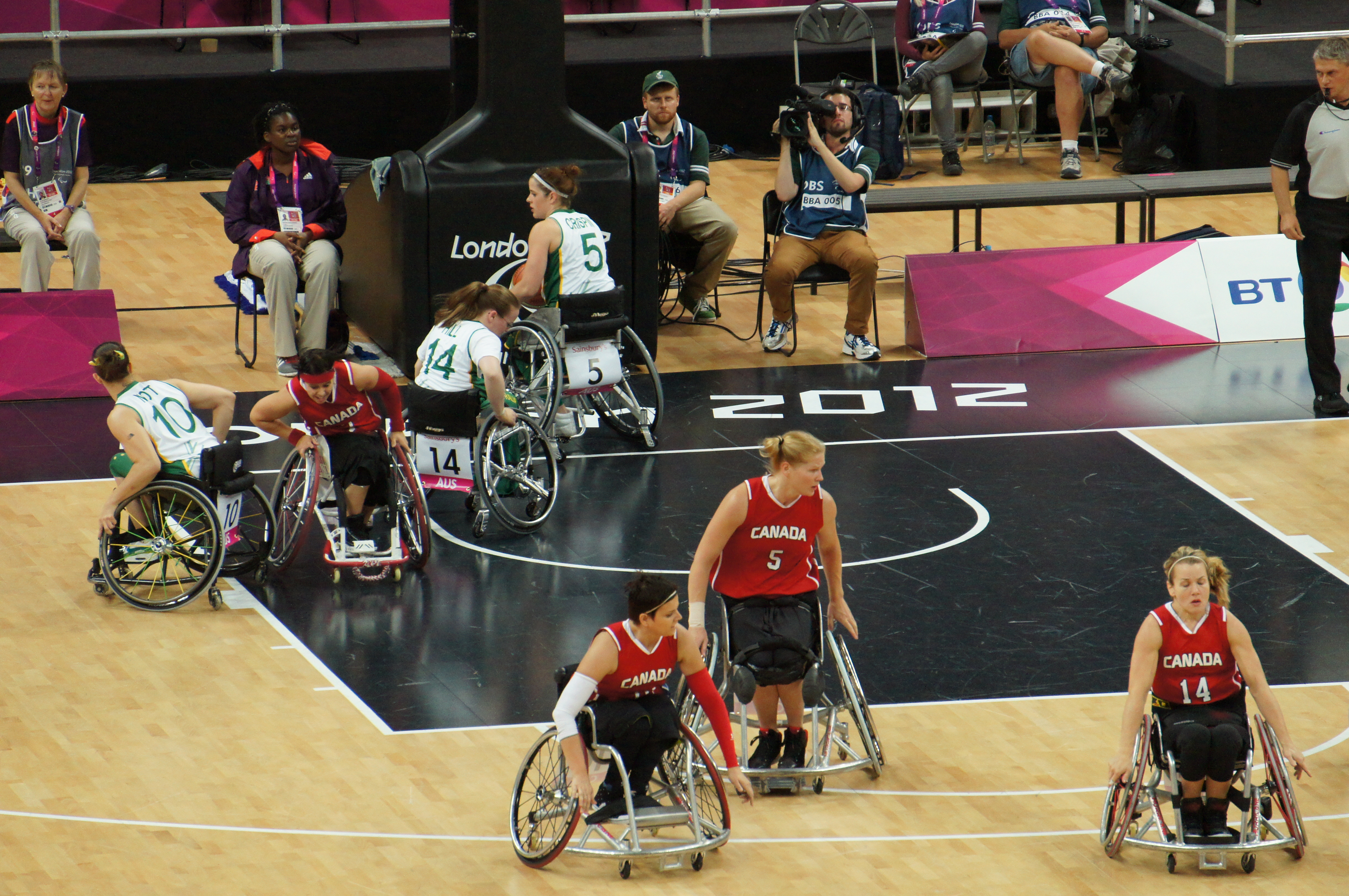
Canadian women's wheelchair basketball team in the match with Australia.

Canada have qualified one men's team and one women's team in wheelchair basketball through their results at the 2010 Wheelchair Basketball World Championship. Competing athletes are given an eight-level-score specific to wheelchair basketball, ranging from 0.5 to 4.5 with lower scores representing a higher degree of disability. The sum score of all players on the court cannot exceed 14.

=== Men's tournament ===
Team	Pld	W	L	PF	PA	PD	Pts	Qualification
Canada	5	5	0	362	280	+82	10	Quarter-finals
Germany	5	4	1	339	303	+36	9	Quarter-finals
Great Britain	5	3	2	365	301	+64	8	Quarter-finals
Poland	5	2	3	327	341	−14	7	Quarter-finals
Japan	5	1	4	273	330	−57	6	Eliminated
Colombia	5	0	5	223	334	−111	5	Eliminated

Group play

30 August 2012
13:00

Report

Japan	53–68	Canada
Scoring by quarter: 11–16, 10–19, 10–18, 22–15
Pts: Fujimoto 16; Rebs: Fujimoto 11; Asts: Kozai 5		Pts: Anderson 32; Rebs: Anderson 13; Asts: Peter, Anderson 3

Basketball Arena, London
Referees: Cristian Roja (ITA)

31 August 2012
21:15

Report

Canada	70–54	Great Britain
Scoring by quarter: 20–11, 14–18, 18–7, 18–18
Pts: Anderson 29; Rebs: Anderson 10; Asts: Anderson 14		Pts: Choudhry 11; Rebs: Highcock 7 Asts: Orogbemi 6

North Greenwich Arena, London
Referees: Max Kindervater (GER)

1 September 2012
21:15

Report

Canada	83–65	Poland
Scoring by quarter: 16–18, 23–17, 18–12, 26–18
Pts: Anderson 34; Rebs: Anderson 9 Asts: Anderson 12		Pts: Filipski 20; Rebs: Łuszyński 7 Asts: Filipski, Łuszyński 7

North Greenwich Arena, London
Referees: Phil Haines (AUS)

2 September 2012
15:15

Report

Germany	66–73	Canada
Scoring by quarter: 18–17, 10–19, 19–17, 19–20
Pts: Passiwan 29; Rebs: Passiwan 8 Asts: Passiwan 8		Pts: Anderson 25; Rebs: Anderson 15; Asts: Anderson 12

Basketball Arena, London
Referees: Matt Wells (AUS)

3 September 2012
10:45

Report

Canada	68–42	Colombia
Scoring by quarter: 21–8, 21–16, 13–4, 13–14
Pts: Durepos 18; Rebs: Johnson 6 Asts: Hedges 6		Pts: Hawkins 12; Rebs: Londoño 9 Asts: Chaparro 6

North Greenwich Arena, London
Referees: Philip Haines (AUS)

Quarter-final

5 September 2012
19:00

Report

Canada	77–51	Spain
Scoring by quarter: 25–12, 18–13, 14–16, 20–10
Pts: Anderson 16; Rebs: Anderson 14; Asts: Durepos, Anderson 6		Pts: García Moreno 16; Rebs: Zarzuela Beltrán 6 Asts: García Moreno 5

North Greenwich Arena, London
Referees: Matt Wells (AUS)

Semi-final

6 September 2012
21:15

Report

Great Britain	52–69	Canada
Scoring by quarter: 16–21, 11–12, 10–24, 15–12
Pts: Orogbemi 14; Rebs: Bywater, Sagar 5 Asts: Pollock 5		Pts: Anderson 17; Rebs: Johnson 14; Asts: Anderson 11

North Greenwich Arena, London
Referees: Mati Quintana (ARG)

Gold medal match

8 September 2012
21:15

Report

Australia	58–64	Canada
Scoring by quarter: 15–14, 12–12, 15–20, 16–18
Pts: Norris 19; Rebs: Eveson 8 Asts: Eveson 5		Pts: Anderson 34; Rebs: Anderson 10; Asts: Anderson 8

North Greenwich Arena, London
Referees: Juan Uruñuela (ESP)

=== Women's tournament ===
Team	Pld	W	L	PF	PA	PD	Pts	Qualification
Australia	4	3	1	211	180	+31	7 (Note: head-to-head score differential: AUS: +2; NED: +2; CAN: −4) (Note: Netherlands and Australia have the same score difference but Australia won the match from the Netherlands (58–49))	Quarter-finals
Netherlands	4	3	1	236	194	+42	7	Quarter-finals
Canada	4	3	1	248	231	+17	7	Quarter-finals
Great Britain	4	1	3	151	217	−66	5	Quarter-finals
Brazil	4	0	4	190	214	−24	4	Eliminated

Rules for classification: 1) Table points, 2) Head-to-head score differential
Notes:

Group play

31 August 2012
19:00

Report

Canada	59–70	Netherlands
Scoring by quarter: 10–25, 17–9, 16–19, 16–17
Pts: McLachlan 26; Rebs: McLachlan 15; Asts: Harnock, Ferguson 5		Pts: Bejer 34; Rebs: Bejer 14; Asts: Huitzing 11

North Greenwich Arena, London
Referees: Adam Fronczak (POL)

1 September 2012
18:30

Report

Australia	50–57	Canada
Scoring by quarter: 12–20, 20–13, 8–10, 10–14
Pts: Merritt 16; Rebs: Crispin 15; Asts: Chaplin 7		Pts: McLachlan 28; Rebs: McLachlan 21; Asts: Ouellet 9

Basketball Arena, London
Referees: Karen Molina (COL)

2 September 2012
15:15

Report

Canada	65–61	Brazil
Scoring by quarter: 17–13, 14–10, 16–16, 18–12
Pts: McLachlan 36; Rebs: Ouellet 8 Asts: McLachlan 23		Pts: Soares Martins 26; Rebs: Soares Martins 11; Asts: Guimarães da Costa 7

North Greenwich Arena, London
Referees: Carsten Rehling (GER)

3 September 2012
13:00

Report

Great Britain	50–67	Canada
Scoring by quarter: 16–14, 9–20, 11–21, 14–12
Pts: Freeman 18; Rebs: Freeman, Conroy 7 Asts: Freeman 5		Pts: Harnock 20; Rebs: McLachlan 15; Asts: Ouellet, Ferguson 8

North Greenwich Arena, London
Referees: Valerie Farrugia (FRA)

Quarter-final

4 September 2012
21:15

Report

United States	67–55	Canada
Scoring by quarter: 10–21, 19–12, 16–8, 22–14
Pts: Miller 26; Rebs: Murray 11; Asts: Murray 10		Pts: McLachlan 31; Rebs: McLachlan 13; Asts: Ouellet 6

North Greenwich Arena, London
Referees: Cristian Salguero (ARG)

Semi-final for 5th–8th place

6 September 2012
8:30

Report

Canada	74–53	Mexico
Scoring by quarter: 30–4, 12–20, 18–12, 14–17
Pts: McLachlan 24; Rebs: McLachlan 13; Asts: Ouellet 10		Pts: Estrada Bernal 15; Rebs: Estrada Bernal 12; Asts: Vázquez Delgadillo 6

North Greenwich Arena, London
Referees: Philip Haines (AUS)

5th/6th place match

7 September 2012
10:45

Report

Canada	70–73	China
Scoring by quarter: 17–15, 12–14, 13–18, 28–26
Pts: McLachlan 22; Rebs: McLachlan 17; Asts: Harnock 7		Pts: Fu 25; Rebs: Cheng 10; Asts: Long 9

North Greenwich Arena, London
Referees: Max Kindervater (GER)

== Wheelchair fencing ==
Athlete	Event	Qualification			Round of 16	Quarterfinal	Semifinal	Final / BM	
Athlete	Event	Opposition	Score	Rank	Opposition Score	Opposition Score	Opposition Score	Opposition Score	Rank
Pierre Mainville	Men's individual épée B	Bezyazychny (BLR)	1-5	2 Q	Guissone (BRA); 6-15	did not advance			
Pierre Mainville	Men's individual épée B	Guissone (BRA)	5-2	2 Q	Guissone (BRA); 6-15	did not advance			
Pierre Mainville	Men's individual épée B	Pluta (POL)	3-5	2 Q	Guissone (BRA); 6-15	did not advance			
Pierre Mainville	Men's individual épée B	Kurzin (RUS)	5-3	2 Q	Guissone (BRA); 6-15	did not advance			
Pierre Mainville	Men's individual sabre B	Pluta (POL)	1-5	2 Q	n/a	Yusupov (RUS); 9-15	did not advance		
Pierre Mainville	Men's individual sabre B	Cratère (FRA)	5-1	2 Q	n/a	Yusupov (RUS); 9-15	did not advance		
Pierre Mainville	Men's individual sabre B	Marquez (ESP)	5-2	2 Q	n/a	Yusupov (RUS); 9-15	did not advance		
Pierre Mainville	Men's individual sabre B	Sum (HKG)	5-3	2 Q	n/a	Yusupov (RUS); 9-15	did not advance		
Sylvie Morel	Women's individual épée A	Efimova (RUS)	0-5	6	did not advance				
Sylvie Morel	Women's individual épée A	Yee (HKG)	0-5	6	did not advance				
Sylvie Morel	Women's individual épée A	Juhász (HUN)	1-5	6	did not advance				
Sylvie Morel	Women's individual épée A	Kim (KOR)	2-5	6	did not advance				
Sylvie Morel	Women's individual épée A	Poignet (FRA)	1-5	6	did not advance				

== Wheelchair rugby ==
Squad list
Ian Chan
Jason Crone
Patrice Dagenais
Jared Funk
Garett Hickling
Trevor Hirschfield
Fabien Lavoie
Zak Madell
Travis Murao
Patrice Simard
Mike Whitehead
David Willsie

Group stage

Team	Pld	W	D	L	GF	GA	GD	Pts	Qualification
Australia (AUS)	3	3	0	0	182	142	+40	6	Semifinals
Canada (CAN)	3	2	0	1	163	166	−3	4	Semifinals
Sweden (SWE)	3	1	0	2	151	155	−4	2	Eliminated
Belgium (BEL)	3	0	0	3	135	168	−33	0	Eliminated

5 September 2012
19:00

Australia	64 – 52	Canada
Batt 37; Bond 10; Team 4 Carr 3 Harrison 3 Smith 2 Newton 1 Hose 1 Lees 1 Meakin 1 Scott 1	Report	Lavoie 9 Hirschfield 8 Crone 7 Madell 7 Hickling 6 Whitehead 5 Willsie 4 Dagenais 2 Chan 2 Simard 2

Basketball Arena
Attendance: 5,539
Referee: Darren Roberts (USA), Dave Woods (GBR)

6 September 2012
16:15

Canada	58 – 50	Belgium
Madell 18; Hickling 9 Hirschfield 9 Lavoie 5 Chan 4 Whitehead 3 Simard 3 Team 3 Willsie 2 Funk 1	Report	Mertens 24; Genyn 10; Verhaegen 5 Budeners 4 Team 4 Vanacker 3

Basketball Arena
Attendance: 6,225
Referee: Mitch Carr (USA), Chris van de Riet (NED)

7 September 2012
12:15

Canada	53 – 52	Sweden
	Report

Basketball Arena
Attendance: 5,469
Referee: Darren Roberts (USA), Alexander Schreiner (GER)

Semi-finals

8 September 2012
16:15

United States	49 – 50	Canada
	Report

Basketball Arena
Attendance: 4,324
Referee: Alexander Schreiner (GER), Chris van de Riet (NED)

Gold medal match

9 September 2012
14:15

Canada	51 – 66	Australia
Madell 11; Hickling 7 Whitehead 7 Murao 6 Chan 5 Willsie 4 Simard 3 Lavoie 2 Dagenais 1 Hirschfield 1 Team 4	Report	Batt 37; Bond 15; Carr 4 Smith 2 Scott 1 Lees 1 Meakin 1 Newton 1 Harrison 1 Team 3

Basketball Arena
Attendance: 9,048
Referee: Darren Roberts (USA), Chris van de Riet (NED)

== Wheelchair tennis ==
Athlete	Event	Round of 64	Round of 32	Round of 16	Quarter-final	Semi-final	Final / BM	
Athlete	Event	Opposition Score	Opposition Score	Opposition Score	Opposition Score	Opposition Score	Opposition Score	Rank
Philippe Bedard	Men's singles	Boukartcha (MAR); W 7–5, 6–2	Fernandez (ARG); L 0–6, 0–6	Did not advance				
Joel Dembe	Men's singles	Phillipson (GBR); L 2–6, 2–6	Did not advance					
Phillippe Bedard; Joel Dembe	Men's doubles	—N/a		Jewitt / Phillipson (GBR); L 3–6, 1–6	Did not advance			

== See also ==
- 2012 Summer Paralympics
- Canada at the Paralympics
- Canada at the 2012 Summer Olympics
