= Zhang Ying (Paralympic swimmer) =

Chinese Paralympic swimmer

Personal information
- Nationality: Chinese

Sport
- Sport: Swimming
Medal record
Representing China
Women's Paralympic swimming
Summer Paralympics
Silver medal – second place	2016 Rio de Janeiro	Women's 100 metre backstroke S7

Zhang Ying is a Chinese swimmer. She won the silver medal at the Women's 100 metre backstroke S7 event at the 2016 Summer Paralympics with 1:23.34. She was fourth placed at the same event at the 2012 Summer Paralympics with an Asian record of 1:25.63.
