= Swimming at the 2018 Commonwealth Games – Women's 50 metre butterfly S7 =

Women's 50 metre butterfly S7 at the 2018 Commonwealth Games
- Venue: Gold Coast Aquatic Centre
- Dates: 5 April 2018
- Competitors: 4 from 3 nations
- Winning time: 35.72

Medalists
gold medal	Eleanor Robinson	England
silver medal	Sarah Mehain	Canada

The women's 50 metre butterfly S7 event at the 2018 Commonwealth Games was held on 5 April at the Gold Coast Aquatic Centre. Per Commonwealth Games regulations, as only four participants entered the event, only a gold and silver medal would be awarded.

== Records ==
Prior to this competition, the existing world, Commonwealth and Games records were as follows:

World record	Mallory Weggemann (USA)	33.81	Bismarck, United States	16 June 2012
Commonwealth record				
Games record				

== Schedule ==
The schedule is as follows:

All times are Australian Eastern Standard Time (UTC+10)

Date	Time	Round
Thursday 5 April 2018	11:18	Qualifying
Thursday 5 April 2018	20:27	Final

== Results ==
=== Heats ===
Rank	Lane	Name	Nationality	Time	Notes
1	4	Eleanor Robinson	England	36.38	Q
2	5	Sarah Mehain	Canada	37.24	Q
3	3	Tiffany Thomas Kane	Australia	38.48	Q
4	6	Tess Routliffe	Canada	38.49	Q

=== Final ===
Rank	Lane	Name	Nationality	Time	Notes
1st place, gold medalist(s)	4	Eleanor Robinson	England	35.72	
2nd place, silver medalist(s)	5	Sarah Mehain	Canada	37.69	
3	6	Tess Routliffe	Canada	37.85	
4	3	Tiffany Thomas Kane	Australia	38.68	
