= Jacqueline Freney =

Australian Paralympic swimmer

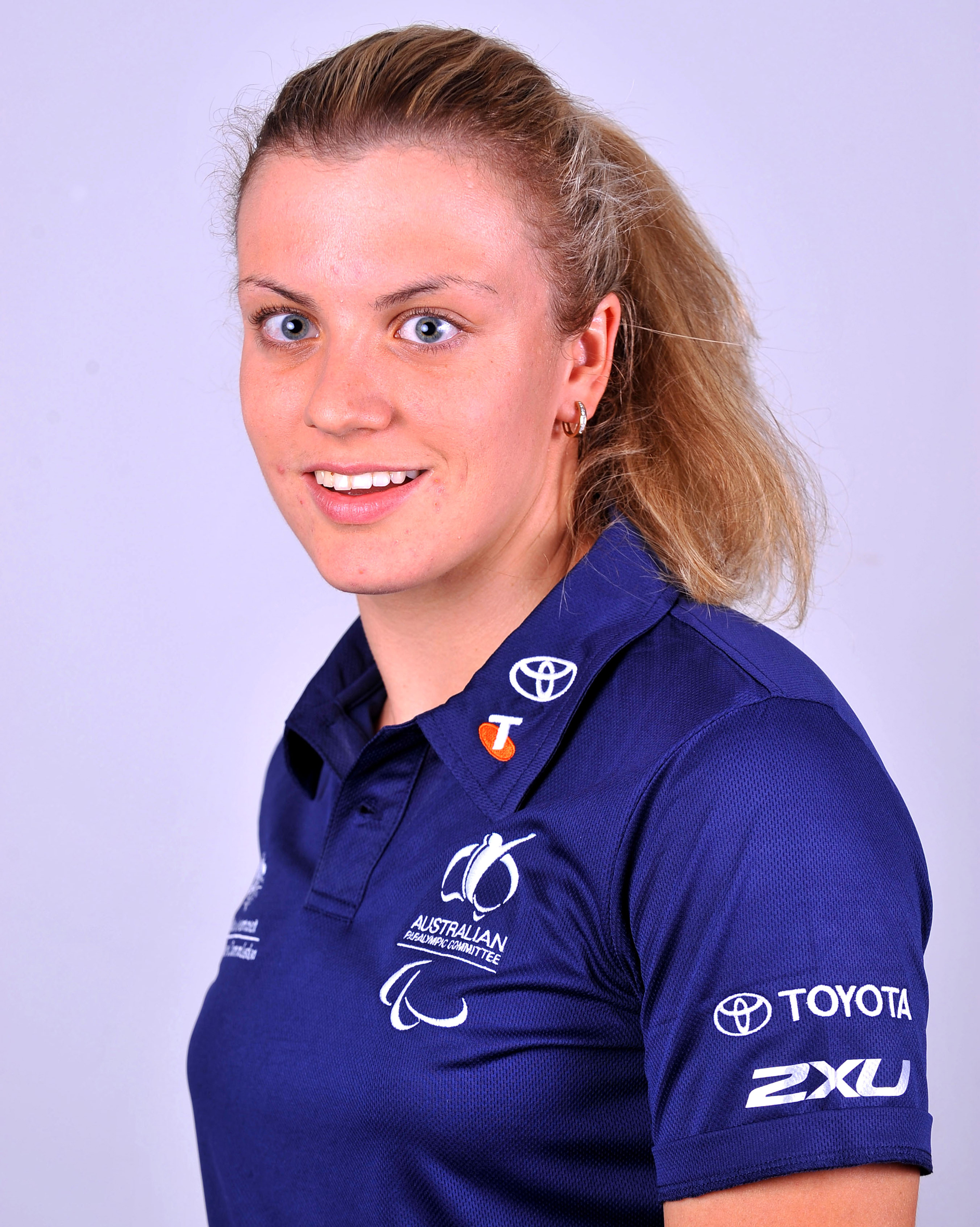
- 2012 Australian Paralympic team portrait of Freney

Personal information
- Full name: Jacqueline Rose Freney
- Nationality: Australia
- Born: 6 June 1992 (age 34) Brisbane, Queensland, Australia

Sport
- Sport: Swimming
- Strokes: Backstroke, Freestyle, Medley
- Classifications: S7, SB7, SM7
- Club: Richmond Valley
- Coach: Michael Freney
Medal record
Women's paralympic swimming
Representing Australia
Paralympic Games
Gold medal – first place	2012 London	50 m freestyle S7
Gold medal – first place	2012 London	100 m freestyle S7
Gold medal – first place	2012 London	400 m freestyle S7
Gold medal – first place	2012 London	100 m backstroke S7
Gold medal – first place	2012 London	50 m butterfly S7
Gold medal – first place	2012 London	200 m medley SM7
Gold medal – first place	2012 London	4×100 m freestyle
Gold medal – first place	2012 London	4×100 m medley
Bronze medal – third place	2008 Beijing	50 m freestyle S8
Bronze medal – third place	2008 Beijing	100 m freestyle S8
Bronze medal – third place	2008 Beijing	400 m freestyle S8
World Championships (LC)
Silver medal – second place	2010 Eindhoven	100 m freestyle S8
Silver medal – second place	2010 Eindhoven	400 m freestyle S8
World Championships (SC)
Silver medal – second place	2009 Rio de Janeiro	100 m freestyle S8
Silver medal – second place	2009 Rio de Janeiro	400 m freestyle S8
Silver medal – second place	2009 Rio de Janeiro	100 m backstroke S8
Silver medal – second place	2009 Rio de Janeiro	100 m butterfly S8
Bronze medal – third place	2009 Rio de Janeiro	50 m freestyle S8
Bronze medal – third place	2009 Rio de Janeiro	4×100 m freestyle relay 34 pts

Jacqueline Rose "Jacqui" Freney OAM (born 6 June 1992) is an Australian Paralympic swimmer. At the 2012 London Games, she broke Siobhan Paton's Australian record of six gold medals at a single Games by winning her seventh gold medal in the Women's 400 m Freestyle S7. She finished the Games with eight gold medals, more than any other participant in the Games.

== Biography ==
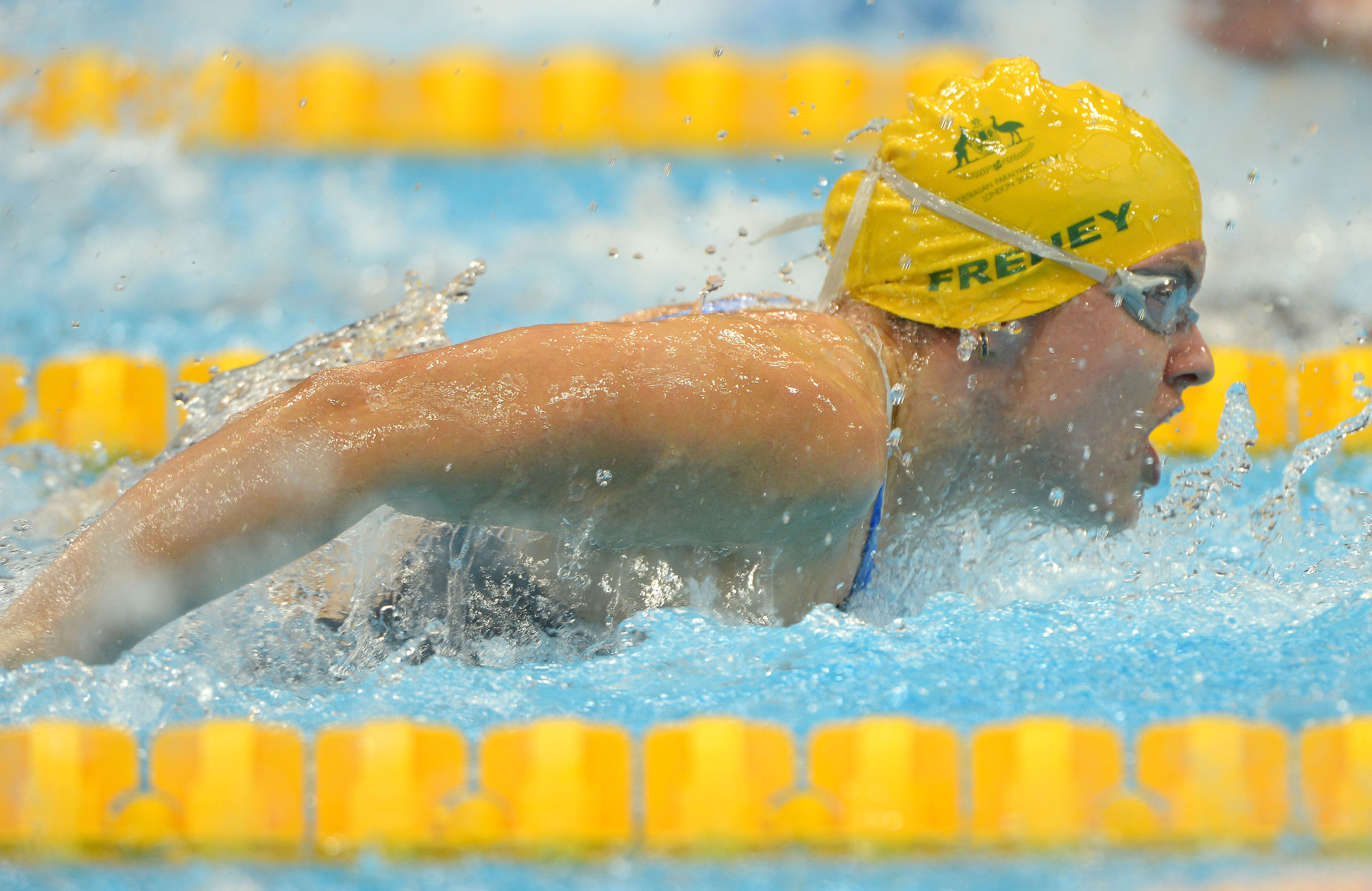
Freney at the 2012 London Paralympics

Jacqueline Rose Freney was born in Brisbane, Queensland with spastic diplegia cerebral palsy. She won three bronze medals at the 2008 Beijing Games in the women's 100m freestyle S8 event, 400m freestyle S8 event and 50m freestyle S8 event. In 2012 at the London Paralympic Games she won 8 gold medals in the women's 100m backstroke S7, women's 50m butterfly S7, 100m freestyle S7, 400m freestyle S7, 50m freestyle S7, 200m individual medley SM7, 4 × 100 m freestyle relay 34 pts, and the 4 × 100 m medleyrelay event. She broke Siobhan Paton's Australian record of six gold medals at a single Games by winning her seventh gold medal in the Women's 400 m Freestyle S7. In breaking the record she said "Seven, I am in heaven". She finished the Games with eight gold medals, more than any other participant in the games.

Freney lives in Skenners Head, Ballina, New South Wales, and is coached by her father Michael. Her grandfather Peter Freney coached 2000 Sydney Games multiple gold medallist Siobhan Paton. Freney's grandfather now assists in her career development. In 2008, she was awarded an Australian Institute of Sport paralympic swimming scholarship.

At the 2010 IPC Swimming World Championships in Eindhoven, Netherlands, she won silver medals in the women's 100m freestyle and 400m freestyle events S8 events. In 2011, a week before the Can-Am Swimming Open, Freney was reclassified from S8 to S7. At the 2011 Can-Am Swimming Open in La Mirada, she set a world record in the S7 400m freestyle event twice, once during the heats and again during the finals with a time of 4:59.95 on her way to winning a gold medal. At the Can-Am Swimming Open, she won two silver medals in the S7 50m and 100m freestyle events.

Freney was unable to compete at the 2016 Summer Paralympic Games in Rio de Janeiro due to a medical issue. Freney had been suffering from electromagnetic sensations triggered by strenuous training and was unable to find an answer as to why this issue occurred.

== Recognition ==
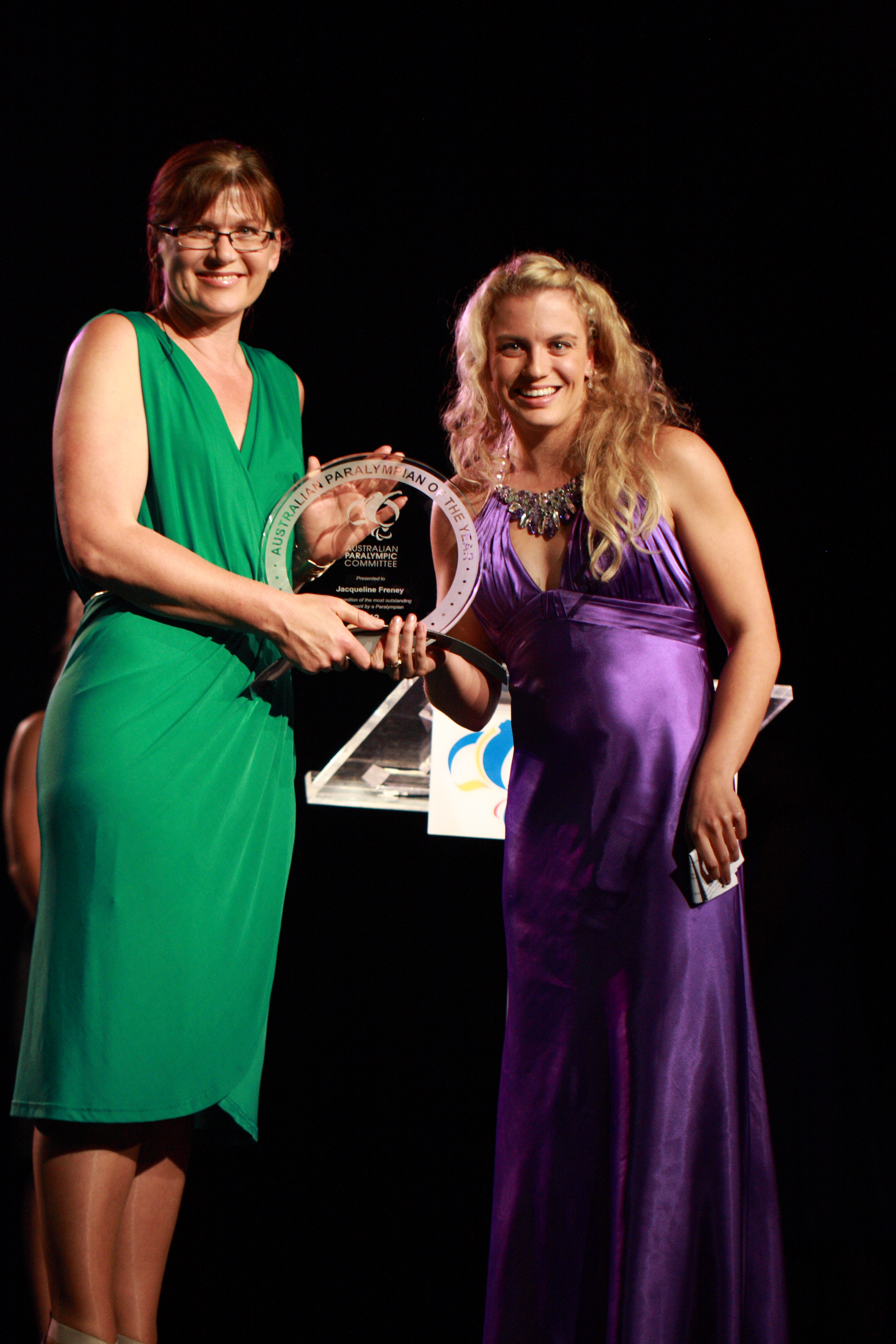
Freney receives the trophy as the 2012 Australian Paralympian of the Year from the Australian Minister for Sport Kate Lundy

In February 2012 Freney was named Ballina Shire's Sportsperson of the Year. She was a finalist for the 2012 Australian Paralympian of the Year, and won both best female and the top overall honour. In 2012, Freney was declared Paralympian of the Year by Australia Post and this achievement was celebrated with the release of a commemorative stamp which featured the inspirational athlete. In November 2013 she was named New South Wales Young Australian of the Year for 2014. On 25 January 2014 she was named Young Australian of the Year. The following day she was also awarded a Medal of the Order of Australia "For service to sport as a gold medallist at the London 2012 Paralympic Games". In October 2014 she was inducted into the Path of Champions at the Sydney Olympic Park Aquatic Centre.

Freney earned her Young Australian of the Year award in 2014 by being actively involved in the community, working with Swimming Australia as a motivational speaker to help people with disabilities to reach their true potential.

Awards
Preceded by (United States) Jessica Long	World Disabled Swimmer of the Year; 2012	Succeeded by (New Zealand) Sophie Pascoe
Preceded by Akram Azimi	Young Australian of the Year; 2014	Succeeded by Drisana Levitzke-Gray
