= Ke Liting =

Chinese Paralympic swimmer

Liting Ke
Personal information
- Nationality: Chinese
- Born: 28 November 1994 (age 31) Huizhou, Guangdong, China

Sport
- Sport: Swimming
Medal record
Representing China
Women's Paralympic swimming
Summer Paralympics
Gold medal – first place	2016 Rio de Janeiro	100 m backstroke S7
Asian Para Games
Gold medal – first place	2018 Jakarta	50m freestyle S7
Silver medal – second place	2022 Hangzhou	100 m freestyle S7
Bronze medal – third place	2022 Hangzhou	400 m freestyle S8

Liting Ke is a Chinese swimmer. She won the gold medal at the Women's 100 metre backstroke S7 event at the 2016 Summer Paralympics with 1:23.06.
