= Verônica Almeida =

Brazilian Paralympic swimmer

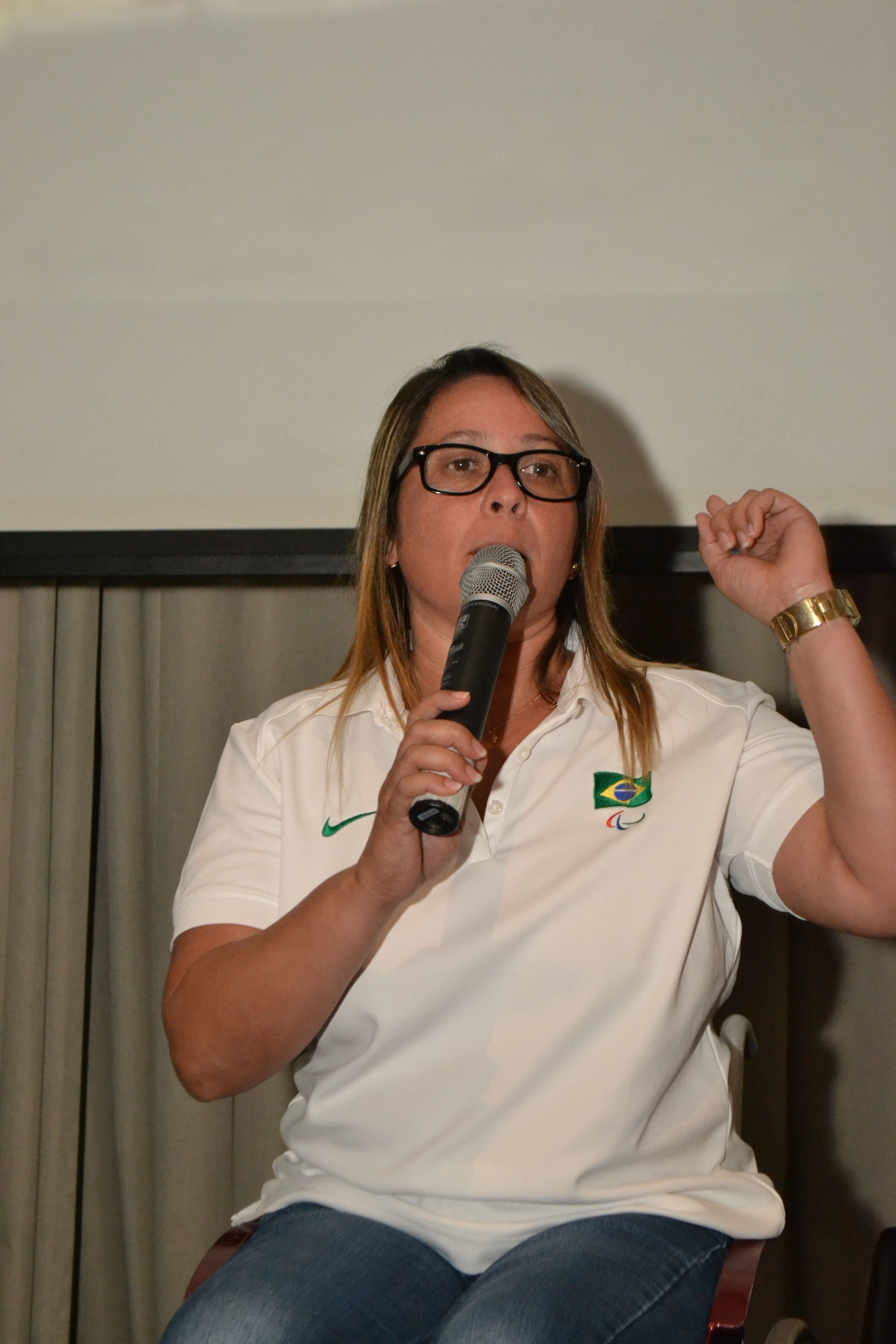

Personal information
- Full name: Verônica Mauadie de Almeida
- Born: 15 May 1975 (age 51) Salvador, Bahia, Brazil
- Height: 1.53 m (5 ft 0 in)

Sport
- Country: Brazil
- Sport: Paralympic swimming
- Disability: Ehler-Danlos syndrome
- Disability class: S7
Medal record
Paralympic swimming
Representing Brazil
Paralympic Games
Bronze medal – third place	2008 Beijing	50m butterfly S7
World Championships (LC)
Bronze medal – third place	2010 Eindhoven	50m freestyle S7
World Championships (SC)
Bronze medal – third place	2009 Rio de Janeiro	50m butterfly S7
Parapan American Games
Silver medal – second place	2015 Toronto	100m breaststroke SB7
Bronze medal – third place	2015 Toronto	50m freestyle S7

Verônica Mauadie de Almeida (born 15 May 1975) is a Brazilian Paralympic swimmer who competes in international elite competitions. She is a Paralympic bronze medalist, double World bronze medalist and a double Parapan American Games medalist.
