= Stacey Williams (swimmer) =

American swimmer (born 1981)

Personal information
- Nationality: Australia
- Born: November 2, 1981 (age 44) Subiaco, Western Australia
Medal record
Swimming
Paralympic Games
Bronze medal – third place	2000 Sydney	Women's 100 m Breaststroke SB7
IPC Swimming World Championships
Bronze medal – third place	2002 Mar Del Plata	Men's 100 m Breaststroke SB7

Stacey Williams (born November 2, 1981) is a Paralympic swimming competitor from Australia. She was born in Subiaco, Western Australia and educated at La Salle College. She won a bronze medal at the 2000 Sydney Games in the Women's 100 m Breaststroke SB7 event. She was born on 2 November 1981.
