= Kirsten Bruhn =

German Paralympic swimmer (born 1969)

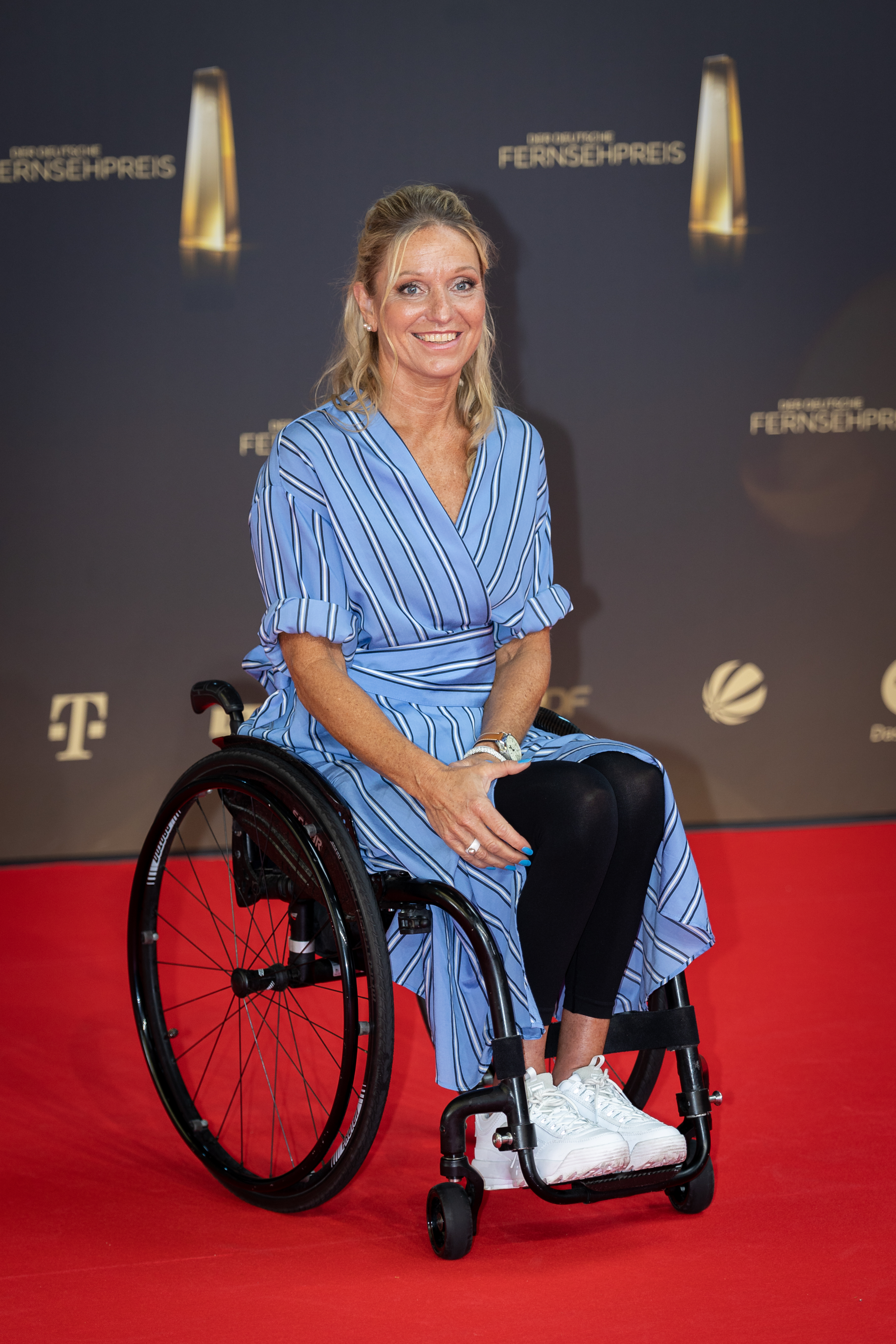

Personal information
- Born: 3 November 1969 (age 56) Eutin, West Germany
- Home town: Berlin, Germany
- Height: 1.77 m (5 ft 10 in)
- Weight: 61 kg (134 lb)

Sport
- Country: Germany
- Sport: Paralympic swimming
- Disability: Spinal cord injury
- Disability class: S7, SB5, SM6
- Coached by: Manfred Bruhn (father), Ute Schinkitz
- Retired: 2014
Medal record
Paralympic swimming
Representing Germany
Paralympic Games
Gold medal – first place	2004 Athens	Women's 100m breaststroke SB5
Gold medal – first place	2008 Beijing	Women's 100m breaststroke SB5
Gold medal – first place	2012 London	Women's 100m breaststroke SB5
Silver medal – second place	2004 Athens	Women's 50m freestyle S7
Silver medal – second place	2004 Athens	Women's 100m backstroke S7
Silver medal – second place	2008 Beijing	Women's 100m backstroke S7
Silver medal – second place	2012 London	Women's 100m backstroke S7
Bronze medal – third place	2004 Athens	Women's 100m freestyle S7
Bronze medal – third place	2008 Beijing	Women's 50m freestyle S7
Bronze medal – third place	2008 Beijing	Women's 100m freestyle S7
Bronze medal – third place	2008 Beijing	Women's 400m freestyle S7
World Championships (Long Course)
Gold medal – first place	2006 Durban	Women's 100m backstroke S7
Gold medal – first place	2006 Durban	Women's 100m breaststroke SB5
Gold medal – first place	2010 Eindhoven	Women's 100m breaststroke SB5
Gold medal – first place	2010 Eindhoven	Women's 100m backstroke S7
Gold medal – first place	2013 Montreal	Women's 100m backstroke S7
Gold medal – first place	2013 Montreal	Women's 100m breaststroke SB5
Silver medal – second place	2006 Durban	Women's 50m freestyle S7
Silver medal – second place	2006 Durban	Women's 100m freestyle S7
Silver medal – second place	2006 Durban	Women's 400m freestyle S7
Bronze medal – third place	2006 Durban	Women's 4x100m freestyle relay
World Championships (Short Course)
Gold medal – first place	2009 Rio de Janeiro	Women's 100m backstroke S7
Bronze medal – third place	2009 Rio de Janeiro	Women's 100m breaststroke SB7
Bronze medal – third place	2009 Rio de Janeiro	Women's 100m freestyle S7
Bronze medal – third place	2009 Rio de Janeiro	Women's 50m freestyle S7
European Championships
Gold medal – first place	2014 Eindhoven	Women's 100m breaststroke SB5
Gold medal – first place	2014 Eindhoven	Women's 100m backstroke S7
Bronze medal – third place	2014 Eindhoven	Women's 50m freestyle S7

Kirsten Bruhn (born 3 November 1969 in Eutin) is a former German female Paralympic swimmer. She won several Paralympic medals, including back-to-back gold medals in women's SB5 100m breaststroke at the 2004, 2008, and 2012 Summer Paralympics.

== Early life ==
Bruhn was born in 1969 in Eutin and was the youngest of five children. She learnt to swim when she was three and began competing at ten. In 1991 when she was 21 years old, Bruhn sustained a spinal cord injury during a motorcycle trip while on holiday on the island of Kos leaving her partially paralysed.

== Career ==
Bruhn competed in her first para swimming competition in 2002. She made her Paralympic debut at the 2004 Summer Paralympics and won gold in the women's SB5 100m breaststroke. She also won silver in the 100m backstroke and 50m freestyle, and bronze in the 100m freestyle. In 2005, she was awarded a Sportplakette des Landes Schleswig-Holstein, an award that recognizes the achievements of sportspeople from Schleswig-Holstein.

Bruhn also competed at the 2008 and 2012 Summer Paralympics, winning gold in the women's SB5 100m breaststroke both times in addition to other medals. She was featured in the 2013 film, Gold – You Can Do More Than You Think, alongside para-athletes Henry Wanyoike and Kurt Fearnley. The film portrayed the everyday lives of disabled athletes and showcased Bruhn, Wanyoike, and Fearnley's journeys to winning gold at the 2012 Paralympics. Film crews followed Bruhn for 18 months to make the film.

The 2014 European Championships marked Bruhn's final competition. After retiring from sport, Bruhn worked as an ambassador for rehabilitation, prevention, and sports at Unfallkrankenhauses Berlin (Berlin Accident Hospital). In 2015, she was elected chairperson of the board of trustees of the German Disabled Sports Association (DBS). Her autobiography, Mein Leben und wie ich es zurückgewann (My Life and How I Won It Back), was published in 2016. She was appointed to the expert committee of Deutsche Sporthilfe in 2024.

== Publications ==
- Mein Leben und wie ich es zurückgewann, Neues Leben, Berlin 2016, ISBN 978-3-355-01844-9.
