= Rebecca Dubber =

New Zealand swimmer (born 1993)

Personal information
- Nickname: Becs
- Born: 14 May 1993 (age 33)

Sport
- Sport: Swimming
- Classifications: S7, SB6, SM7
- Club: North Shore Swimming Club
Medal record
Women's para swimming
Representing New Zealand
Paralympic Games
Bronze medal – third place	2016 Rio de Janeiro	100 m backstroke S7
World Championships
Silver medal – second place	2015 Glasgow	100 m backstroke S7
Silver medal – second place	2015 Glasgow	400 m freestyle S7
Bronze medal – third place	2010 Eindhoven	100 m backstroke S7

Rebecca Dubber (born 14 May 1993) is a New Zealand retired para-swimmer. She represented New Zealand at the 2012 Summer Paralympics in London and at the 2016 Summer Paralympics in Rio de Janeiro. At the 2016 Games, she won the bronze medal in the women's 100 m backstroke S7.

Dubber grew up on the North Shore of Auckland. She was born with sacral agenesis. She was educated at Carmel College, and later the Auckland University of Technology, graduating with a Bachelor of Communication Studies in 2018.

Dubber started sport as a triathlete. She retired from swimming in March 2019.
