= Katrina Porter =

Australian Paralympic swimmer

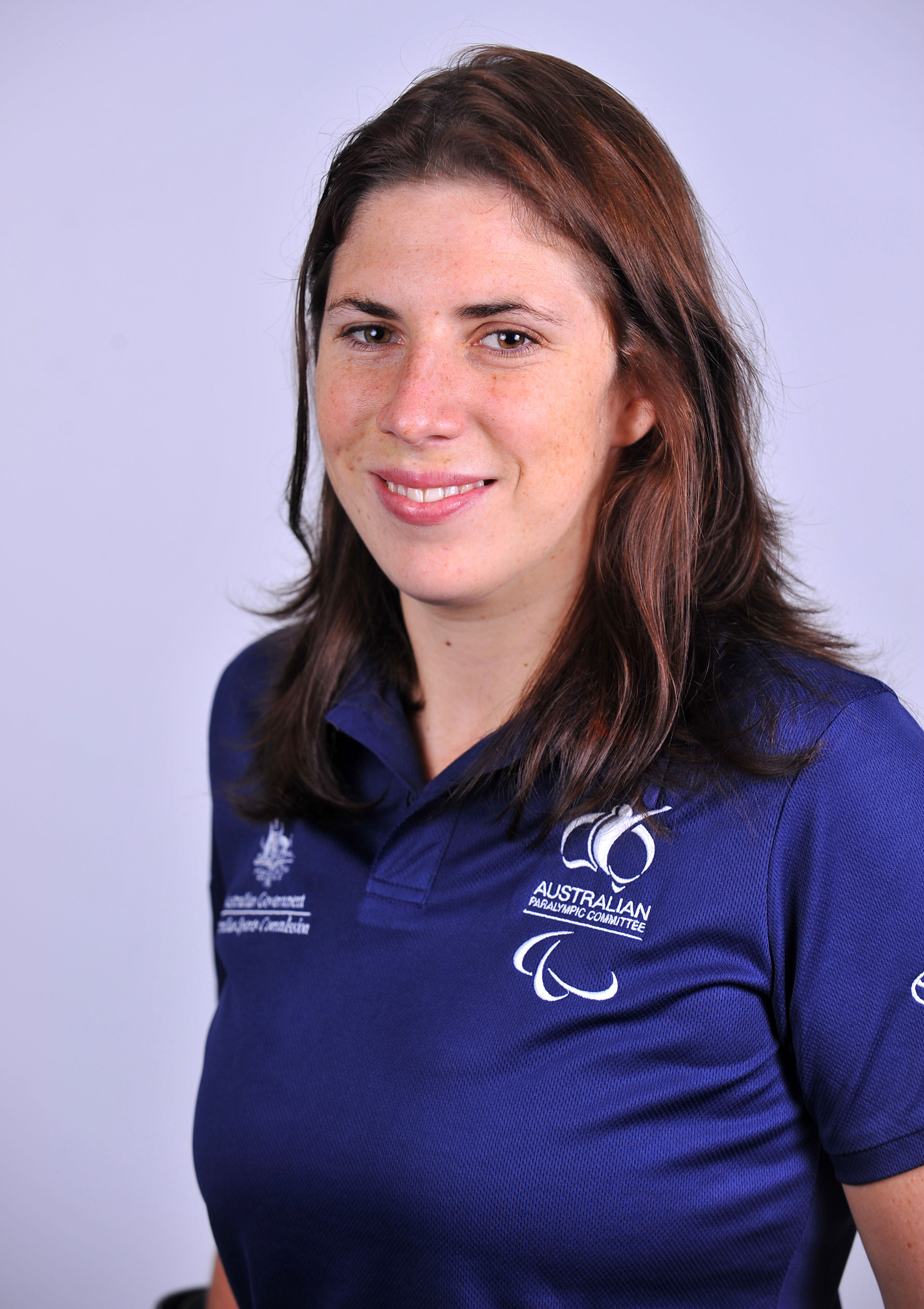
- 2012 Australian Paralympic team portrait of Porter

Personal information
- Full name: Katrina Porter
- Nationality: Australia
- Born: 29 November 1988 (age 37) Perth, Western Australia
- Height: 1.55 m (5 ft 1 in)
- Weight: 52 kg (115 lb)

Sport
- Sport: Swimming
- Strokes: Freestyle, backstroke, breaststroke
- Classifications: S7, SB6, SM7
Medal record
Women's paralympic swimming
Representing Australia
Paralympic Games
Gold medal – first place	2008 Beijing	100 m backstroke S7
World Championships (LC)
Bronze medal – third place	2006 Durban	100 m breaststroke SB6

Katrina Porter, OAM (born 29 November 1988) is an Australian Paralympic swimmer. She was born in Perth with arthrogryposis multiplex congenita, a condition that causes muscle weakness and joint stiffness. She used hydrotherapy as a child and moved to competitive swimming at the age of ten.

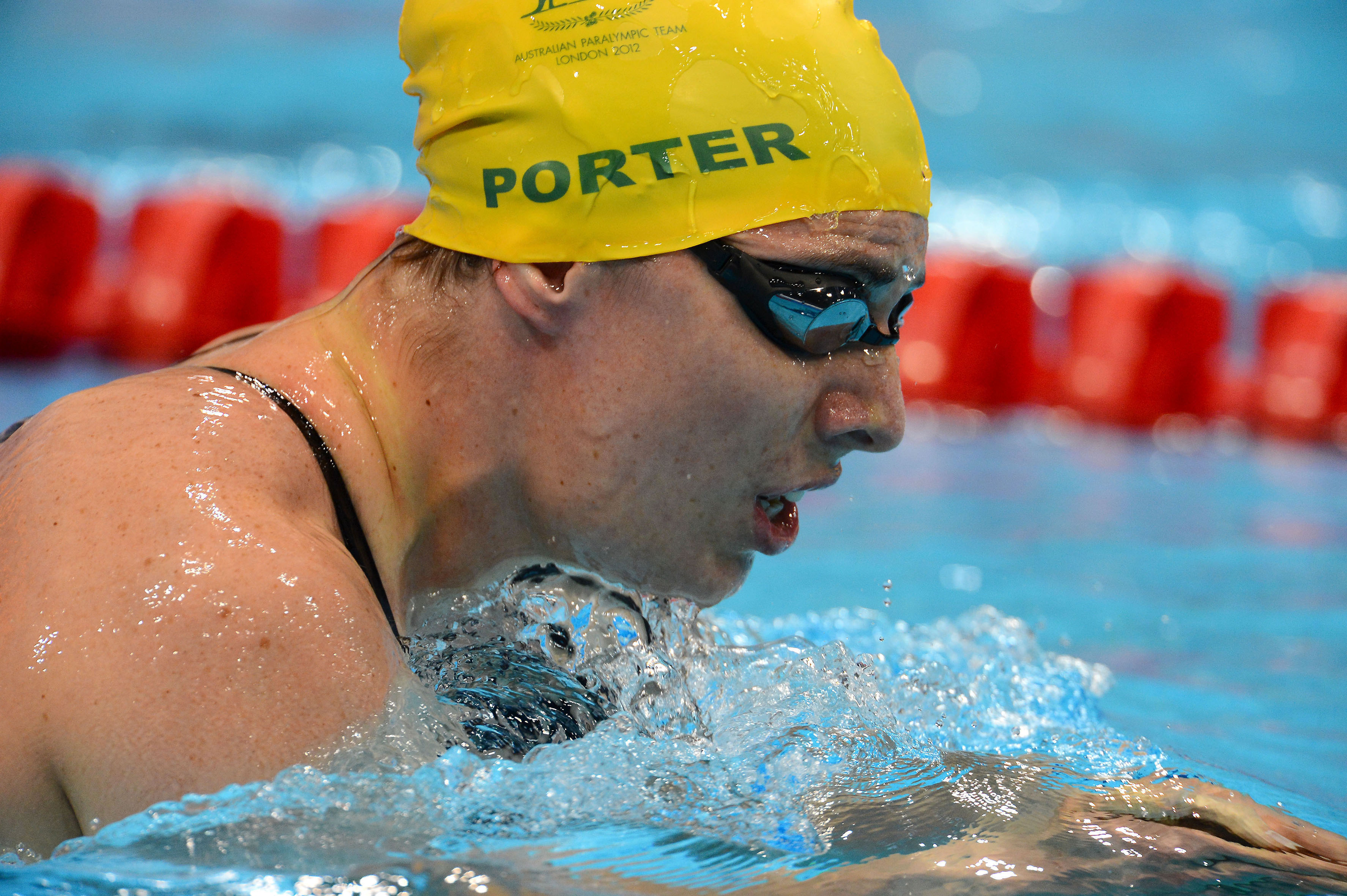
Porter at the 2012 London Paralympics

She competed in three events but did not win any medals in the 2004 Athens Games. At the 2006 IPC Swimming World Championships in Durban, South Africa, she won a bronze medal in the Women's 100 m breaststroke SB6. At the 2008 Beijing Games, she competed in five events and won a gold medal in the Women's 100 m backstroke S7 event in a world record, for which she received a Medal of the Order of Australia.

She has been an Australian Institute of Sport paralympic swimming scholarship holder. She is a Western Australian Institute of Sport scholarship holder.

In 2010, she was a finalist for the Western Australia Young Australian of the Year award. In 2011, she was named the Western Australian Multi Class Swimmer of the Year. Her ex-partner Michael Hartnett has represented Australia in wheelchair basketball.

She competed at the 2012 Summer Paralympics.
