= Susana Schnarndorf =

Brazilian Paralympic swimmer (born 1967)

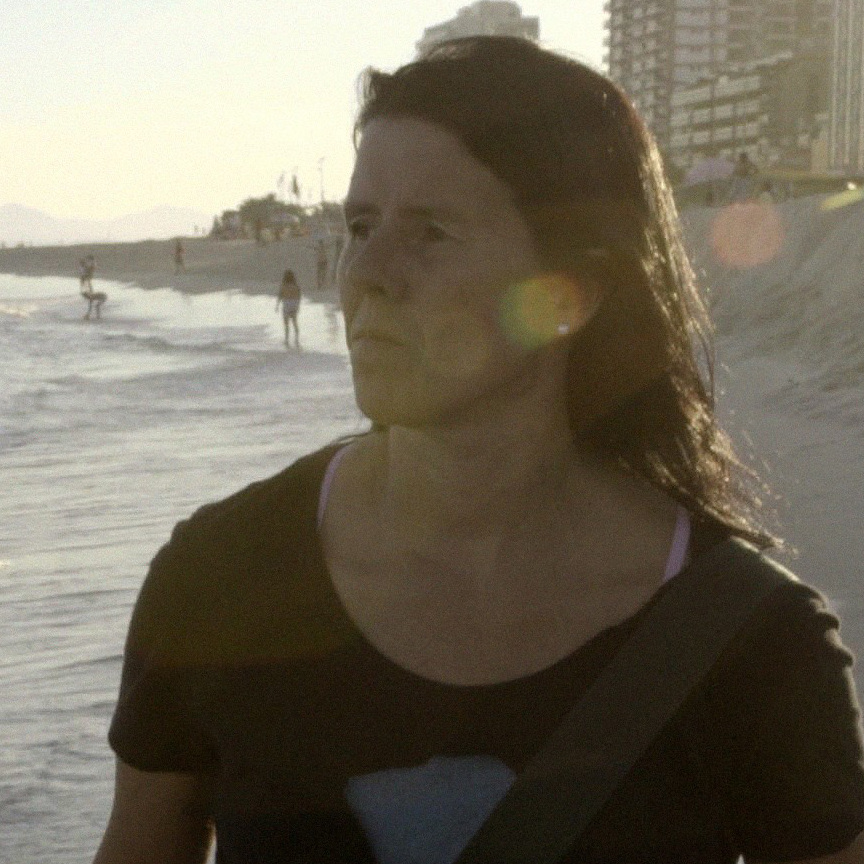
- Brazilian Paralympic Swimmer Susana Schnarndorf during a photo shoot in 2015 at Barra da Tijuca beach in Rio de Janeiro, Brazil.

Personal information
- Born: October 12, 1967 (age 58) Porto Alegre, Rio Grande do Sul, Brazil
- Years active: 1990–2019
- Website: http://www.susanaschnarndorf.com.br

Sport
- Sport: Paralympic Swimming
- Disability: Multiple System Atrophy
- Disability class: S4, SB5, SM4
- Club: Grêmio Náutico União
Medal record
Representing Brazil
Paralympic Games
Silver medal – second place	2016 Rio	Mixed 4×50 m freestyle 20 pts
World Championships
Silver medal – second place	2023 Manchester	200 m freestyle S3
Bronze medal – third place	2023 Manchester	50 m freestyle S3
Bronze medal – third place	2023 Manchester	100 m freestyle S3

Susana Schnarndorf Ribeiro (Porto Alegre, October 12, 1967) is a Brazilian Paralympic swimmer. In 2005, after a lengthy triathlon career, at the age of 37, Schnarndorf began to experience the first symptoms of a degenerative disease that was later diagnosed as multiple system atrophy (MSA). After a break from professional athletics, Schnarndorf returned to the sports world as a swimmer and is presently a member of the Brazilian Paralympic Swimming Team.

== Professional life ==
Susana began her swimming career at age of 11 in Porto Alegre, Rio Grande do Sul, under the coaching of Mauri Fonseca. She was a five-time Brazilian triathlon champion, competing in numerous races between 1993 and 1997. Susana competed in the 1995 Pan American Games in Mar Del Plata, Argentina. She moved to Rio de Janeiro and married Brazilian triathlete Alexandre Ribeiro, with whom she participated in several international triathlon competitions. Susana competed in a total of 13 WTC Ironman Triathlons, winning six of them. Along with Alexandre Ribeiro, Susana had three children: Kaillani, Kaipo and Maila. However, in 2005, just a few months after the birth of her daughter, the couple divorced. Later that year, Schnarndorf began to feel the first symptoms of a mysterious degenerative disease that was later diagnosed as Multiple System Atrophy.

Susana won a silver medal at the 2016 Summer Paralympic Games in Rio de Janeiro, representing her country of Brazil in the mixed 4x50m freestyle relay category.

== Multiple System Atrophy ==
It took several years before Schnarndorf received the correct diagnosis of Multiple System Atrophy. Her condition worsened in 2008, when she lost coordination of the left side of her body. As a result of her progressive disability, Schnarndorf was unable to raise her three children alone, causing them to move into their father's home. Multiple system atrophy (MSA) causes degeneration of multiple parts of the nervous system and results in muscle rigidity, incoordination, and a progressive decline in function of vital organs such as the lungs and heart. Neurological damage is irreversible and permanent. The life expectancy varies from 5 to 10 years.

== Paralympic sport ==
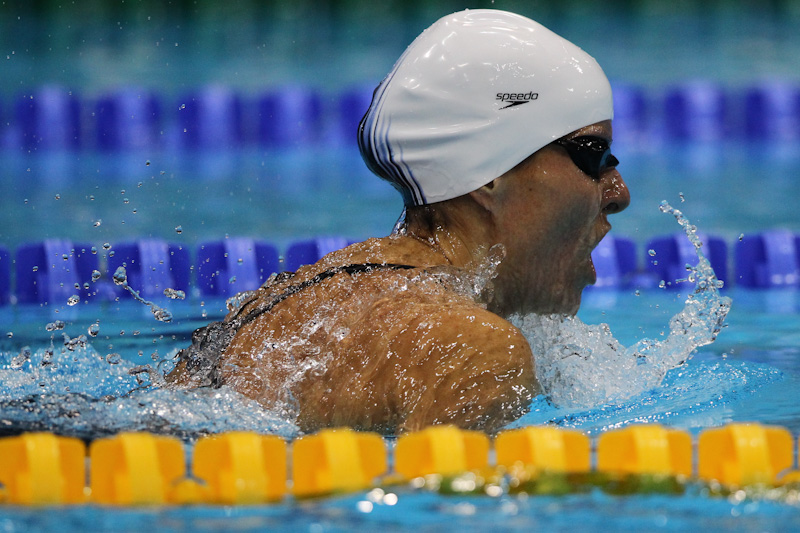
Swimming at 2012 paralympics in London

After a period of profound depression, Schnarndorf joined the Brazilian Paralympic Swimming team in 2010. Susana was Brazilian champion and record holder in the 50m freestyle, 100m freestyle, 400m freestyle, 100m breaststroke and 200m medley between 2010 and 2012. In London 2012 Summer Paralympics, she was fourth place in the 100m breaststroke (SB7) and fifth in the 200m medley (SM7). In 2013, she won the 100m freestyle world championship in the SB6 category at the IPC Paralympic World Swimming Championships in Montreal, Canada. Susana received the award for best female athlete, also in 2013, at the Paralympic Prize in Rio de Janeiro. On September 9, 2016, Schnarndorf won the silver medal at the Rio 2016 Paralympic Games, in the 4x50m freestyle mixed relay, along with swimmers like Daniel Dias, Joana Silva and Clodoaldo Silva on September 9, 2016.

== Documentaries ==
In 2016, Schnarndorf was featured in the documentary '4All' along with other well-known Brazilian paralympians.

In 2018, the documentary A Day for Susana directed by Giovanna Giovanini and Rodrigo Boecker, which portrayed Susana between the years 2014 and 2016, showing her family and health dramas during her journey to the Paralympic Games of 2016 in Rio de Janeiro. The film had its world premiere during the 42nd São Paulo International Film Festival and was officially selected for the 40th Havana Film Festival, 43rd Atlanta Film Festival, 17th Gdansk DocFilm Festival in Poland and 13th This Human World in Austria, where it received an honorable jury mention in the Up and Coming session.

== Support for research and charity ==
In September 2017, a US non-governmental organisation, Defeat MSA established the 'Susana Schnarndorf MSA Legacy Fund' with an aim to raise money for medical education, scientific research and support for MSA patients, especially those suffering from the disease in South America.
