= Chantel Wolfenden =

Australian Paralympic swimmer

Personal information
- Full name: Chantel Louise Wolfenden
- Nationality: Australia
- Born: 15 January 1986 (age 40) Lithgow, New South Wales
Medal record
Swimming
Representing Australia
Paralympic Games
Gold medal – first place	2004 Athens	Women's 400 m Freestyle S7
Silver medal – second place	2004 Athens	Women's 100 m Freestyle S7
Bronze medal – third place	2004 Athens	Women's 100 m Backstroke S7
Bronze medal – third place	2004 Athens	Women's 200 m Individual Medley SM7
Bronze medal – third place	2004 Athens	Women's 4x100 m Freestyle 34 pts
Bronze medal – third place	2004 Athens	Women's 4x100 m Medley 34 pts
IPC Swimming World Championships
Gold medal – first place	2002 Mar Del Plata	Women's 400 m Freestyle S7
Silver medal – second place	2002 Mar Del Plata	Women's 4x100 m Freestyle Relay 34 pts
Bronze medal – third place	2002 Mar Del Plata	Women's 100 m Freestyle S7
Bronze medal – third place	2002 Mar Del Plata	Women's 100 m Backstroke S7

Chantel Louise Wolfenden, OAM (born 15 January 1986) is an Australian Paralympic swimmer. Born in the New South Wales town of Lithgow, she started to swim at the age of five as therapy for cerebral palsy. She underwent three operations to cut and lengthen her Achilles tendon.

She competed at the 2002 IPC Swimming World Championships in Mar Del Plata, Argentina winning a gold medal in the women's 400m Freestyle S7 and two silver medals in the women's 100m Backstroke and women's 100m Freestyle S7 events.

At the 2004 Athens Games, she won a gold medal in the Women's 400 m Freestyle S7 event, for which she received a Medal of the Order of Australia, a silver medal in the Women's 100 m Freestyle S7 event, and four bronze medals in the Women's 100 m Backstroke S7, Women's 200 m Individual Medley SM7, Women's 4 × 100 m Freestyle 34 pts and Women's 4 × 100 m Medley 34 pts events.

She swam for the Fairmead Swim Club in Bundaberg, Queensland and was coached by Paul Simms. Between 2002 and 2006, she was an Australian Institute of Sport Paralympic swimming scholarship holder. She was also a Queensland Academy of Sport scholarship holder.
