= Brianna Nelson =

Canadian Paralympic swimmer

Personal information
- Nationality: Canadian
- Citizenship: Canada
- Born: 9 May 1992 (age 34) Calgary, Alberta
- Height: 165 cm (5 ft 5 in)
- Weight: 61 kg (134 lb)

Sport
- Country: Canada
- Sport: Para-swimming
Medal record
Female's para-swimming
Paralympic Games
Silver medal – second place	2012 London	50 m butterfly
Silver medal – second place	2012 London	200 m medley
IPC World Championships
Gold medal – first place	2013 Canada	50 m butterfly
- Updated on 31 August 2014

Brianna Nelson (born 9 May 1992) is a S7 classified Canadian para-swimmer who has competed in the 2008 and 2012 Paralympics. She was introduced to swimming by her cycling coach and had won two silver medals and one gold in the Paralympics and the IPC Swimming World Championships. She currently attends the University of Victoria.

== Personal life ==
Nelson was born on 9 May 1992 in Calgary, Alberta. She resides in Victoria, British Columbia. She started swimming when her cycling coach Stephen Burke recommended swimming to improve core strength and balance. She later gave up cycling to continue swimming. She was born with cerebral palsy that effects her right side. She practices at Saanich Commonwealth Place where her freestyle had improved by a full second. Nelson currently attends the University of Victoria where she studies history and psychology.

== Career ==
=== 2012 London Paralympics ===
Nelson's second Paralympic, After she had won the two silver medals in the 50 metre butterfly and 200 metre individual medley. She said, "I knew it was going to be a battle for the silver medal, I just went for it." She was later congratulated by Canada's Prime Minister Stephen Harper.

=== 2013 International Paralympic Committee ===
Nelson won one gold medal at the Swimming World Championships in 2013. She finished first 1:07 seconds ahead of Britain swimmer Susannah Rodgers clocking 35.70 seconds. She said that "It wasn't a race I was expecting to win, but I wanted to perform well. To get the gold on top of that is amazing."

== See also ==
- Canada at the 2012 Summer Paralympics
