= Sarah Mehain =

Canadian para swimmer

Personal information
- Born: 12 January 1995 (age 31) Nelson, British Columbia, Canada
- Home town: Vernon, British Columbia, Canada
- Height: 165 cm (5 ft 5 in)
- Weight: 49 kg (108 lb)

Sport
- Country: Canada
- Sport: Para swimming
- Disability: Hemiplegia
- Disability class: S7
- Club: McGill University
Medal record
Women's para swimming
Representing Canada
Commonwealth Games
Silver medal – second place	2018 Gold Coast	Women's 50m butterfly S7
World Championships
Bronze medal – third place	2013 Montreal	Women's 50m butterfly S7
Bronze medal – third place	2015 Glasgow	Women's 50m butterfly S7
Parapan American Games
Gold medal – first place	2015 Toronto	Women's 50m butterfly S7
Silver medal – second place	2015 Toronto	Women's 50m freestyle S7
Silver medal – second place	2015 Toronto	Women's 100m freestyle S7
Silver medal – second place	2015 Toronto	Women's 100m backstroke S7

Sarah Mehain (born 12 January 1995) is a Canadian para swimmer.

Mehain studied sustainable sciences at McGill University in Montreal and can speak English and French. she has cerebral palsy and is hemiplegic.

She has participated at the Paralympic Games in 2012 and 2016. She won a silver medal at the 2018 Commonwealth Games in the 50 metre butterfly S7 event.
