= Oxana Guseva =

Russian Paralympic swimmer

Medal record

Women's swimming

Representing Russia

Paralympic Games
Silver medal – second place	2004 Athens	400 metre freestyle - S7

IPC World Championships
Silver medal – second place	2013 Montreal	4x100m medley relay 20pts
Bronze medal – third place	2010 Eindhoven	4x100m medley relay 34pts
Bronze medal – third place	2013 Montreal	4x50m freestyle relay 20pts

IPC European Championships
Silver medal – second place	2009 Reykjavik	200m ind. medley SM7
Silver medal – second place	2009 Reykjavik	4×100 m medley relay 34pts
Silver medal – second place	2014 Eindhoven	400m freestyle S7
Bronze medal – third place	2009 Reykjavik	100 m freestyle – S7
Bronze medal – third place	2009 Reykjavik	400 m freestyle – S7

Oxana Guseva is a Paralympic swimmer from Russia competing mainly in category S7 events.

== Career ==
Oxana competed in both the 2004 and 2008 Summer Paralympics winning a solitary silver medal. It was in 2004 she won that medal in the 400m freestyle behind Australia's Chantel Wolfenden who swam a new games record, she also finished sixth in the 100m freestyle, eighth in the 50m butterfly, fourth in the 200m individual medley but failed to make the final of the 100m freestyle and was part of the Russian team that finished fourth in the 4 × 100 m medley just 0.12 seconds behind the bronze medal-winning Australian team. At the 2008 games she again swam in the 400m freestyle but this time could only manage sixth, she also finished eighth in the 100m freestyle, eighth in the 50m butterfly and sixth in the individual medley.
