= Swimming at the 2004 Summer Paralympics – Women's 100 metre freestyle S8 =

Women's 100m Freestyle S8 at the XII Paralympic Games
- Paralympic Swimming
- Venue: Olympic Aquatic Centre
- Dates: 20 September 2004
- Competitors: 15 from 10 nations
- Winning time: 1:09.67

Medalists
1st place, gold medalist(s)		Jessica Long	United States
2nd place, silver medalist(s)		Keren Or Leybovitch	Israel
3rd place, bronze medalist(s)		Cecilie Drabsch	Norway

The Women's 100 metre freestyle S8 swimming event at the 2004 Summer Paralympics was competed on 20 September. It was won by Jessica Long, representing United States.

== 1st round ==
Qualified for final round

Heat 1

20 Sept. 2004, morning session

Rank	Athlete	Time	Notes
1	Heidi Andreasen (FRO)	1:12.38	
2	Lichelle Clarke (AUS)	1:14.09	
3	Mariann Vestbostad (NOR)	1:15.80	
4	Aneta Michalska (POL)	1:18.20	
5	Andrea Cole (CAN)	1:18.25	
6	Katrina Porter (AUS)	1:20.79	
7	Christina Heer (SUI)	1:22.01	

Heat 2

20 Sept. 2004, morning session

Rank	Athlete	Time	Notes
1	Jessica Long (USA)	1:10.73	
2	Keren Or Leybovitch (ISR)	1:11.27	
3	Pernille Thomsen (NED)	1:13.37	
4	Cecilie Drabsch (NOR)	1:13.82	
5	Chantal Boonacker (NED)	1:15.15	
6	Immacolata Cerasuolo (ITA)	1:20.82	
7	Magdalena Jaroslawska (POL)	1:21.81	
8	Sarah Castle (USA)	1:23.66	

== Final round ==
20 Sept. 2004, evening session

Rank	Athlete	Time	Notes
1st place, gold medalist(s)	Jessica Long (USA)	1:09.67	PR
2nd place, silver medalist(s)	Keren Or Leybovitch (ISR)	1:09.86	
3rd place, bronze medalist(s)	Cecilie Drabsch (NOR)	1:12.29	
4	Pernille Thomsen (NED)	1:12.46	
5	Heidi Andreasen (FRO)	1:12.74	
6	Lichelle Clarke (AUS)	1:14.51	
7	Chantal Boonacker (NED)	1:16.07	
8	Mariann Vestbostad (NOR)	1:16.26	
