= Swimming at the 2004 Summer Paralympics – Women's 50 metre freestyle S8 =

Women's 50m Freestyle S8 at the XII Paralympic Games
- Paralympic Swimming
- Venue: Olympic Aquatic Centre
- Dates: 26 September 2004
- Competitors: 15 from 10 nations
- Winning time: 31.51

Medalists
| 1st place, gold medalist(s) | | Cecilie Drabsch | Norway |
| 2nd place, silver medalist(s) | | Keren Or Leybovitch | Israel |
| 3rd place, bronze medalist(s) | | Pernille Thomsen | Netherlands |

The Women's 50 metre freestyle S8 swimming event at the 2004 Summer Paralympics was competed on 26 September. It was won by Cecilie Drabsch, representing Norway.

== 1st round ==
| Qualified for final round |

Heat 1

26 Sept. 2004, morning session

| Rank | Athlete | Time | Notes |
|---|---|---|---|
| 1 | Cecilie Drabsch (NOR) | 32.75 | |
| 2 | Heidi Andreasen (FRO) | 33.27 | |
| 3 | Jessica Long (USA) | 33.30 | |
| 4 | Mariann Vestbostad (NOR) | 34.93 | |
| 5 | Lichelle Clarke (AUS) | 35.75 | |
| 6 | Lu Weiyuan (CHN) | 35.79 | |
| 7 | Sarah Castle (USA) | 38.21 | |

Heat 2

26 Sept. 2004, morning session

| Rank | Athlete | Time | Notes |
|---|---|---|---|
| 1 | Keren Or Leybovitch (ISR) | 32.68 | |
| 2 | Pernille Thomsen (NED) | 32.98 | |
| 3 | Toni Davis (USA) | 35.23 | |
| 4 | Chantal Boonacker (NED) | 35.24 | |
| 5 | Aneta Michalska (POL) | 35.49 | |
| 6 | Andrea Cole (CAN) | 35.57 | |
| 7 | Magdalena Jaroslawska (POL) | 36.76 | |
| 8 | Aguilar Desiree (PAN) | 44.17 | |

== Final round ==
26 Sept. 2004, evening session

| Rank | Athlete | Time | Notes |
|---|---|---|---|
| 1st place, gold medalist(s) | Cecilie Drabsch (NOR) | 31.51 | WR |
| 2nd place, silver medalist(s) | Keren Or Leybovitch (ISR) | 32.11 | |
| 3rd place, bronze medalist(s) | Pernille Thomsen (NED) | 32.95 | |
| 4 | Heidi Andreasen (FRO) | 33.31 | |
| 5 | Jessica Long (USA) | 33.60 | |
| 6 | Mariann Vestbostad (NOR) | 34.71 | |
| 7 | Toni Davis (USA) | 35.03 | |
| 8 | Chantal Boonacker (NED) | 35.21 | |
