= Swimming at the 2004 Summer Paralympics – Women's 400 metre freestyle S8 =

Event at the 2004 Summer Paralympics

Women's 400m Freestyle S8 at the XII Paralympic Games
- Paralympic Swimming
- Venue: Olympic Aquatic Centre
- Dates: 24 September 2004
- Competitors: 13 from 11 nations
- Winning time: 5:07.88

Medalists
1st place, gold medalist(s)		Jessica Long	United States
2nd place, silver medalist(s)		Lichelle Clarke	Australia
3rd place, bronze medalist(s)		Heidi Andreasen	Faroe Islands

The Women's 400 metre freestyle S8 swimming event at the 2004 Summer Paralympics was competed on 24 September. It was won by Jessica Long, representing the United States.

== 1st round ==
Qualified for final round

Heat 1

24 Sept. 2004, morning session

Rank	Athlete	Time	Notes
1	Heidi Andreasen (FRO)	5:28.27	
2	Chantal Boonacker (NED)	5:31.18	
3	Lichelle Clarke (AUS)	5:32.39	
4	Christina Heer (SUI)	5:50.49	
5	Magdalena Jaroslawska (POL)	5:52.48	
6	Immacolata Cerasuolo (ITA)	6:09.17	

Heat 2

24 Sept. 2004, morning session

Rank	Athlete	Time	Notes
1	Jessica Long (USA)	5:12.87	
2	Keren Or Leybovitch (ISR)	5:32.28	
3	Katrina Porter (AUS)	5:34.54	
4	Andrea Cole (CAN)	5:43.92	
5	Aneta Michalska (POL)	5:46.98	
6	Timea Poprocsi (HUN)	6:00.98	
7	Lu Weiyuan (CHN)	6:33.07	

== Final round ==
24 Sept. 2004, evening session

Rank	Athlete	Time	Notes
1st place, gold medalist(s)	Jessica Long (USA)	5:07.88	PR
2nd place, silver medalist(s)	Lichelle Clarke (AUS)	5:22.99	
3rd place, bronze medalist(s)	Heidi Andreasen (FRO)	5:26.29	
4	Chantal Boonacker (NED)	5:31.51	
5	Aneta Michalska (POL)	5:33.20	
6	Keren Or Leybovitch (ISR)	5:34.43	
7	Katrina Porter (AUS)	5:35.63	
8	Andrea Cole (CAN)	5:44.29	
