= Swimming at the 2008 Summer Paralympics – Women's 100 metre freestyle S8 =

Women's 100m Freestyle S8 at the XIII Paralympic Games
- Venue: Beijing National Aquatics Center
- Dates: 8 September
- Competitors: 16 from 11 nations
- Winning time: 1:06.91

Medalists
| 1st place, gold medalist(s) | | Jessica Long | United States |
| 2nd place, silver medalist(s) | | Heather Frederiksen | Great Britain |
| 3rd place, bronze medalist(s) | | Jacqueline Freney | Australia |

The women's 100m freestyle S8 event at the 2008 Summer Paralympics took place at the Beijing National Aquatics Center on 8 September. There were three heats; the swimmers with the eight fastest times advanced to the final.

== Results ==
=== Heats ===
Competed from 10:49.

==== Heat 1 ====
Results of heat 1
| Rank | Name | Nationality | Time | Notes |
|---|---|---|---|---|
| 1 | Jacqueline Freney | Australia | 1:09.92 | Q |
| 2 | Xu Yanru | China | 1:13.51 | Q |
| 3 | Stefanie Weinberg | Germany | 1:14.65 | |
| 4 | Rhiannon Oliver | Australia | 1:15.57 | |
| 5 | Andrea Cole | Canada | 1:19.58 | |

==== Heat 2 ====
Results of heat 2
| Rank | Name | Nationality | Time | Notes |
|---|---|---|---|---|
| 1 | Heather Frederiksen | Great Britain | 1:09.93 | Q |
| 2 | Julia Kabus | Germany | 1:12.64 | Q |
| 3 | Mariann Vestbostad | Norway | 1:14.62 | |
| 4 | Anna Vengerovskaya | Russia | 1:20.89 | |
| 5 | Desire Aguilar | Panama | 1:31.84 | |

==== Heat 3 ====
Results of heat 3
| Rank | Name | Nationality | Time | Notes |
|---|---|---|---|---|
| 1 | Jessica Long | United States | 1:06.81 | Q, WR |
| 2 | Amanda Everlove | United States | 1:10.84 | Q |
| 3 | Cecilie Drabsch Norland | Norway | 1:11.68 | Q |
| 4 | Heidi Andreasen | Faroe Islands | 1:12.77 | Q |
| 5 | Chen Zhonglan | China | 1:17.13 | |
| 6 | Valeria Lira | Brazil | 1:20.16 | |

=== Final ===
Competed at 20:01.

Results of the finals
| Rank | Name | Nationality | Time | Notes |
|---|---|---|---|---|
| 1st place, gold medalist(s) | Jessica Long | United States | 1:06.91 | |
| 2nd place, silver medalist(s) | Heather Frederiksen | Great Britain | 1:08.48 | |
| 3rd place, bronze medalist(s) | Jacqueline Freney | Australia | 1:08.56 | |
| 4 | Amanda Everlove | United States | 1:10.65 | |
| 5 | Cecilie Drabsch Norland | Norway | 1:11.88 | |
| 6 | Heidi Andreasen | Faroe Islands | 1:11.99 | |
| 7 | Julia Kabus | Germany | 1:12.68 | |
| 8 | Xu Yanru | China | 1:13.66 | |
