= Swimming at the 2004 Summer Paralympics – Women's 200 metre individual medley SM8 =

Women's 200m Individual Medley SM8 at the XII Paralympic Games
- Paralympic Swimming
- Venue: Olympic Aquatic Centre
- Dates: 23 September 2004
- Competitors: 9 from 7 nations
- Winning time: 2:55.01

Medalists
1st place, gold medalist(s)		Dóra Pásztory	Hungary
2nd place, silver medalist(s)		Immacolata Cerasuolo	Italy
3rd place, bronze medalist(s)		Keren Or Leybovitch	Israel

The Women's 200 metre individual medley SM8 swimming event at the 2004 Summer Paralympics was competed on 23 September. It was won by Dóra Pásztory, representing Hungary.

== 1st round ==
Qualified for final round

Heat 1

23 Sept. 2004, morning session

Rank	Athlete	Time	Notes
1	Keren Or Leybovitch (ISR)	3:07.13	
2	Andrea Cole (CAN)	3:08.70	
3	Brooke Stockham (AUS)	3:09.80	
4	Yang Weijia (CHN)	3:10.45	

Heat 2

23 Sept. 2004, morning session

Rank	Athlete	Time	Notes
1	Dóra Pásztory (HUN)	2:57.86	WR
2	Immacolata Cerasuolo (ITA)	3:02.27	
3	Lu Weiyuan (CHN)	3:04.35	
4	Xu Yanru (CHN)	3:09.72	
5	Heidi Andreasen (FRO)	3:12.71	

== Final round ==
23 Sept. 2004, evening session

Rank	Athlete	Time	Notes
1st place, gold medalist(s)	Dóra Pásztory (HUN)	2:55.01	WR
2nd place, silver medalist(s)	Immacolata Cerasuolo (ITA)	3:02.03	
3rd place, bronze medalist(s)	Keren Or Leybovitch (ISR)	3:03.38	
4	Lu Weiyuan (CHN)	3:06.15	
5	Xu Yanru (CHN)	3:08.90	
6	Andrea Cole (CAN)	3:09.92	
7	Yang Weijia (CHN)	3:11.37	
8	Brooke Stockham (AUS)	3:13.38	
