= Swimming at the 2000 Summer Paralympics – Women's 200 metre individual medley SM8 =

Women's 200m individual medley SM8 at the XI Paralympic Games
- Paralympic Swimming

Medalists
1st place, gold medalist(s)		Dora Pasztory	Hungary
2nd place, silver medalist(s)		Gillian Pollock	New Zealand
3rd place, bronze medalist(s)		Brooke Stockham	Australia

The women's 200m individual medley SM8 event took place on 20 October 2000 in Sydney, Australia.

== Results ==
=== Heat 1 ===
Rank	Athlete	Time	Notes
1	Heidi Andreasen (FRO)	3:04.93	Q, PR
2	Brooke Stockham (AUS)	3:05.38	Q
3	Syreeta van Amelsvoort (NED)	3:10.37	Q
4	Andrea Cole (CAN)	3:15.09	Q
5	Shi Tieyin (CHN)	3:17.36	
6	Aneta Michalska (POL)	3:23.18	
7	Laura Tramuns (ESP)	3:29.31	

=== Heat 2 ===
Rank	Athlete	Time	Notes
1	Dora Pasztory (HUN)	3:04.23	Q, PR
2	Gillian Pollock (NZL)	3:04.72	Q
3	Priya Cooper (AUS)	3:09.55	Q
4	Esther Hansen (FRO)	3:13.44	Q
5	Antonia Barnard (RSA)	3:21.47	
6	Nicole Davey (AUS)	3:26.30	
	Pernille Thomsen (DEN)		DQ
	Huang Min (CHN)		DQ

=== Final ===
Rank	Athlete	Time	Notes
1st place, gold medalist(s)	Dora Pasztory (HUN)	3:02.91	PR
2nd place, silver medalist(s)	Gillian Pollock (NZL)	3:04.12	
3rd place, bronze medalist(s)	Brooke Stockham (AUS)	3:04.18	
4	Heidi Andreasen (FRO)	3:04.22	
5	Priya Cooper (AUS)	3:05.33	
6	Syreeta van Amelsvoort (NED)	3:10.04	
7	Esther Hansen (FRO)	3:14.34	
8	Andrea Cole (CAN)	3:14.83	
