= Swimming at the 2004 Summer Paralympics – Women's 100 metre backstroke S8 =

Women's 100m Backstroke S8 at the XII Paralympic Games
- Paralympic Swimming
- Venue: Olympic Aquatic Centre
- Dates: 22 September 2004
- Competitors: 11 from 8 nations
- Winning time: 1:19.55

Medalists
1st place, gold medalist(s)		Keren Or Leybovitch	Israel
2nd place, silver medalist(s)		Dóra Pásztory	Hungary
3rd place, bronze medalist(s)		Chantal Boonacker	Netherlands

The Women's 100 metre backstroke S8 swimming event at the 2004 Summer Paralympics was competed on 22 September. It was won by Keren Or Leybovitch, representing Israel.

== 1st round ==
Qualified for final round

Heat 1

22 Sept. 2004, morning session

Rank	Athlete	Time	Notes
1	Chantal Boonacker (NED)	1:23.89	
2	Pernille Thomsen (NED)	1:27.66	
3	Kobie Scott (AUS)	1:30.09	
4	Aneta Michalska (POL)	1:33.83	
5	Timea Poprocsi (HUN)	1:37.73	

Heat 2

22 Sept. 2004, morning session

Rank	Athlete	Time	Notes
1	Keren Or Leybovitch (ISR)	1:21.20	
2	Dóra Pásztory (HUN)	1:25.59	
3	Mariann Vestbostad (NOR)	1:26.47	
4	Lichelle Clarke (AUS)	1:29.58	
5	Xu Yanru (CHN)	1:32.03	
6	Christina Heer (SUI)	1:39.16	

== Final round ==
22 Sept. 2004, evening session

Rank	Athlete	Time	Notes
1st place, gold medalist(s)	Keren Or Leybovitch (ISR)	1:19.55	
2nd place, silver medalist(s)	Dóra Pásztory (HUN)	1:24.07	
3rd place, bronze medalist(s)	Chantal Boonacker (NED)	1:24.13	
4	Mariann Vestbostad (NOR)	1:25.74	
5	Pernille Thomsen (NED)	1:27.92	
6	Kobie Scott (AUS)	1:30.03	
7	Lichelle Clarke (AUS)	1:30.35	
8	Xu Yanru (CHN)	1:33.23	
