= Swimming at the 2008 Summer Paralympics – Women's 200 metre individual medley SM8 =

Event at the 2008 Summer Paralympics

Women's 200m Individual Medley SM8 at the XIII Paralympic Games
- Venue: Beijing National Aquatics Center
- Dates: 11 September
- Competitors: 13 from 8 nations
- Winning time: 2:41.85

Medalists
1st place, gold medalist(s)		Jessica Long	United States
2nd place, silver medalist(s)		Amanda Everlove	United States
3rd place, bronze medalist(s)		Heather Frederiksen	Great Britain

The women's 200m individual medley SM8 event at the 2008 Summer Paralympics took place at the Beijing National Aquatics Center on 11 September. There were two heats; the swimmers with the eight fastest times advanced to the final.

== Results ==
=== Heats ===
Competed from 10:01.

==== Heat 1 ====
Rank	Name	Nationality	Time	Notes
1	Olesya Vladykina	Russia	2:53.72	Q, PR
2	Heather Frederiksen	Great Britain	2:53.95	Q
3	Jiang Shengnan	China	2:58.61	Q
4	Jin Xiaoqin	China	3:04.29	
5	Stefanie Weinberg	Germany	3:04.97	
6	Anna Vengerovskaya	Russia	3:06.05	

==== Heat 2 ====
Rank	Name	Nationality	Time	Notes
1	Jessica Long	United States	2:42.56	Q, WR
2	Amanda Everlove	United States	2:52.93	Q
3	Immacolata Cerasuolo	Italy	2:56.16	Q
4	Heidi Andreasen	Faroe Islands	3:00.70	Q
5	Lu Weiyuan	China	3:01.03	Q
6	Manami Nomura	Japan	3:03.25	
7	Rachael Latham	Great Britain	3:08.25	

=== Final ===
Competed at 17:55.

Rank	Name	Nationality	Time	Notes
1st place, gold medalist(s)	Jessica Long	United States	2:41.85	WR
2nd place, silver medalist(s)	Amanda Everlove	United States	2:50.51	
3rd place, bronze medalist(s)	Heather Frederiksen	Great Britain	2:53.15	
4	Olesya Vladykina	Russia	2:53.79	
5	Immacolata Cerasuolo	Italy	2:56.24	
6	Jiang Shengnan	China	2:57.45	
7	Heidi Andreasen	Faroe Islands	2:59.00	
8	Lu Weiyuan	China	2:59.99	

Q = qualified for final. WR = World Record. PR = Paralympic Record.
