= Swimming at the 2008 Summer Paralympics – Women's 50 metre freestyle S8 =

Women's 50m Freestyle S8 at the XIII Paralympic Games
- Venue: Beijing National Aquatics Center
- Dates: 14 September
- Competitors: 15 from 10 nations
- Winning time: 32.09

Medalists
1st place, gold medalist(s)		Cecilie Drabsch Norland	Norway
2nd place, silver medalist(s)		Amanda Everlove	United States
3rd place, bronze medalist(s)		Jacqueline Freney	Australia

The women's 50m freestyle S8 event at the 2008 Summer Paralympics took place at the Beijing National Aquatics Center on 14 September. There were two heats; the swimmers with the eight fastest times advanced to the final.

== Results ==
=== Heats ===
Competed from 10:33.

==== Heat 1 ====
Rank	Name	Nationality	Time	Notes
1	Cecilie Drabsch Norland	Norway	32.11	Q
2	Jiang Shengnan	China	32.38	Q
3	Xu Yanru	China	32.44	Q
4	Jacqueline Freney	Australia	32.49	Q
5	Chen Zhonglan	China	33.36	
6	Anna Vengerovskaya	Russia	35.36	
7	Andrea Cole	Canada	37.41	
8	Desire Aguilar	Panama	43.22	

==== Heat 2 ====
Rank	Name	Nationality	Time	Notes
1	Jessica Long	United States	32.54	Q
2	Heather Frederiksen	Great Britain	32.79	Q
3	Amanda Everlove	United States	32.96	Q
4	Heidi Andreasen	Faroe Islands	33.20	Q
5	Julia Kabus	Germany	34.44	
6	Stefanie Weinberg	Germany	34.95	
7	Rhiannon Oliver	Australia	35.25	

=== Final ===
Competed at 19:38.

Rank	Name	Nationality	Time	Notes
1st place, gold medalist(s)	Cecilie Drabsch Norland	Norway	32.09	
2nd place, silver medalist(s)	Amanda Everlove	United States	32.20	
3rd place, bronze medalist(s)	Jacqueline Freney	Australia	32.37	
4	Jiang Shengnan	China	32.47	
5	Xu Yanru	China	32.54	
6	Jessica Long	United States	32.58	
7	Heather Frederiksen	Great Britain	32.59	
8	Heidi Andreasen	Faroe Islands	32.66	

Q = qualified for final.
