= Swimming at the 2004 Summer Paralympics – Women's 100 metre butterfly S8 =

Women's 100m Butterfly S8 at the XII Paralympic Games
- Paralympic Swimming
- Venue: Olympic Aquatic Centre
- Dates: 19 September 2004
- Competitors: 13 from 8 nations
- Winning time: 1:23.04

Medalists
1st place, gold medalist(s)		Immacolata Cerasuolo	Italy
2nd place, silver medalist(s)		Dóra Pásztory	Hungary
3rd place, bronze medalist(s)		Andrea Cole	Canada

The Women's 100 metre butterfly S8 swimming event at the 2004 Summer Paralympics was competed on 19 September. It was won by Immacolata Cerasuolo, representing Italy.

== 1st round ==
Qualified for final round

Heat 1

19 Sept. 2004, morning session

Rank	Athlete	Time	Notes
1	Dóra Pásztory (HUN)	1:25.27	
2	Toni Davis (USA)	1:25.98	
3	Brooke Stockham (AUS)	1:30.18	
4	Yang Yan Lian (CHN)	1:33.35	
5	Aneta Michalska (POL)	1:33.52	
5	Elisabeth Walker (CAN)	1:33.52	

Heat 2

19 Sept. 2004, morning session

Rank	Athlete	Time	Notes
1	Immacolata Cerasuolo (ITA)	1:24.15	
2	Andrea Cole (CAN)	1:26.12	
3	Yang Weijia (CHN)	1:27.61	
4	Kobie Scott (AUS)	1:28.64	
5	Xiao Min (CHN)	1:29.27	
6	Heidi Andreasen (FRO)	1:31.11	
7	Magdalena Jaroslawska (POL)	1:44.01	

== Final round ==
19 Sept. 2004, evening session

Rank	Athlete	Time	Notes
1st place, gold medalist(s)	Immacolata Cerasuolo (ITA)	1:23.04	
2nd place, silver medalist(s)	Dóra Pásztory (HUN)	1:23.85	
3rd place, bronze medalist(s)	Andrea Cole (CAN)	1:24.78	
4	Xiao Min (CHN)	1:26.74	
4	Toni Davis (USA)	1:26.74	
6	Yang Yan Lian (CHN)	1:27.64	
7	Kobie Scott (AUS)	1:29.20	
8	Brooke Stockham (AUS)	1:29.47	
