= Swimming at the 2008 Summer Paralympics – Women's 100 metre backstroke S8 =

Women's 100m Backstroke S8 at the XIII Paralympic Games
- Venue: Beijing National Aquatics Center
- Dates: 10 September
- Competitors: 11 from 8 nations
- Winning time: 1:16.74

Medalists
1st place, gold medalist(s)		Heather Frederiksen	Great Britain
2nd place, silver medalist(s)		Jessica Long	United States
3rd place, bronze medalist(s)		Mariann Vestbostad	Norway

The women's 100m backstroke S8 event at the 2008 Summer Paralympics took place at the Beijing National Aquatics Center on 10 September. There were two heats; the swimmers with the eight fastest times advanced to the final.

== Results ==
=== Heats ===
Competed from 09:47.

==== Heat 1 ====
Rank	Name	Nationality	Time	Notes
1	Mariann Vestbostad	Norway	1:21.77	Q
2	Rachael Latham	Great Britain	1:22.71	Q
3	Keren Leibovitch	Israel	1:22.99	Q
4	Stefanie Weinberg	Germany	1:27.86	Q
5	Andrea Cole	Canada	1:39.26	

==== Heat 2 ====
Rank	Name	Nationality	Time	Notes
1	Heather Frederiksen	Great Britain	1:17.62	Q, PR
2	Jessica Long	United States	1:20.44	Q
3	Jin Xiaoqin	China	1:27.17	Q
4	Lu Weiyuan	China	1:27.76	Q
5	Rhiannon Oliver	Australia	1:34.92	
	Amanda Everlove	United States		DQ

=== Final ===
Competed at 18:10.

Rank	Name	Nationality	Time	Notes
1st place, gold medalist(s)	Heather Frederiksen	Great Britain	1:16.74	WR
2nd place, silver medalist(s)	Jessica Long	United States	1:19.56	
3rd place, bronze medalist(s)	Mariann Vestbostad	Norway	1:20.86	
4	Keren Leibovitch	Israel	1:21.34	
5	Rachael Latham	Great Britain	1:22.38	
6	Jin Xiaoqin	China	1:25.48	
7	Stefanie Weinberg	Germany	1:27.96	
8	Lu Weiyuan	China	1:28.55	

Q = qualified for final. WR = World Record. PR = Paralympic Record. DQ = Disqualified.
