= Swimming at the 2008 Summer Paralympics – Women's 400 metre freestyle S8 =

Event at the 2008 Summer Paralympics

Women's 400m Freestyle S8 at the XIII Paralympic Games
- Venue: Beijing National Aquatics Center
- Dates: 12 September
- Competitors: 9 from 9 nations
- Winning time: 4:50.17

Medalists
1st place, gold medalist(s)		Jessica Long	United States
2nd place, silver medalist(s)		Heather Frederiksen	Great Britain
3rd place, bronze medalist(s)		Jacqueline Freney	Australia

The women's 400m freestyle S8 event at the 2008 Summer Paralympics took place at the Beijing National Aquatics Center on 12 September. There were two heats; the swimmers with the eight fastest times advanced to the final.

== Results ==
=== Heats ===
Competed from 09:14.

==== Heat 1 ====
Rank	Name	Nationality	Time	Notes
1	Heather Frederiksen	Great Britain	4:58.11	Q, PR
2	Julia Kabus	Germany	5:32.76	Q
3	Heidi Andreasen	Faroe Islands	5:35.51	Q
4	Valéria Lira	Brazil	5:46.96	Q

==== Heat 2 ====
Rank	Name	Nationality	Time	Notes
1	Jessica Long	United States	4:47.45	Q, WR
2	Jacqueline Freney	Australia	5:02.32	Q
3	Andrea Cole	Canada	5:35.51	Q
4	Mariann Vestbostad	Norway	5:38.47	Q
5	Xu Yanru	China	6:03.64	

=== Final ===
Competed at 17:10.

Rank	Name	Nationality	Time	Notes
1st place, gold medalist(s)	Jessica Long	United States	4:50.17	
2nd place, silver medalist(s)	Heather Frederiksen	Great Britain	4:54.49	
3rd place, bronze medalist(s)	Jacqueline Freney	Australia	4:57.21	
4	Heidi Andreasen	Faroe Islands	5:20.54	
5	Julia Kabus	Germany	5:22.82	
6	Andrea Cole	Canada	5:30.01	
7	Mariann Vestbostad	Norway	5:39.73	
8	Valéria Lira	Brazil	5:48.87	

Q = qualified for final. WR = World Record. PR = Paralympic Record.
