= Culture of the Faroe Islands =

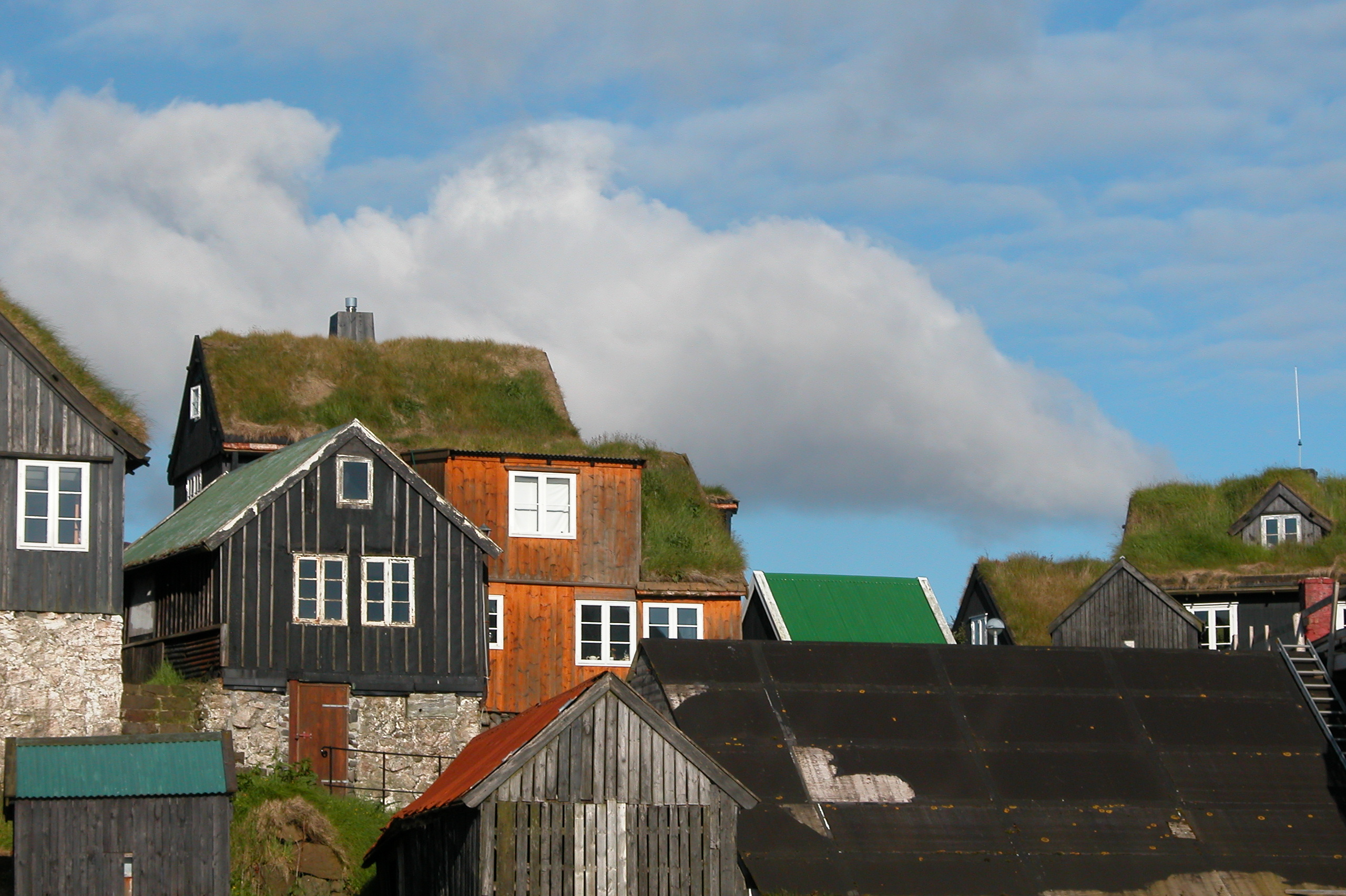
Traditional Faroese houses with turf roof in Reyni, Tórshavn. Most people build larger houses now and with other types of roofs, but the turf roof is still popular in some places.

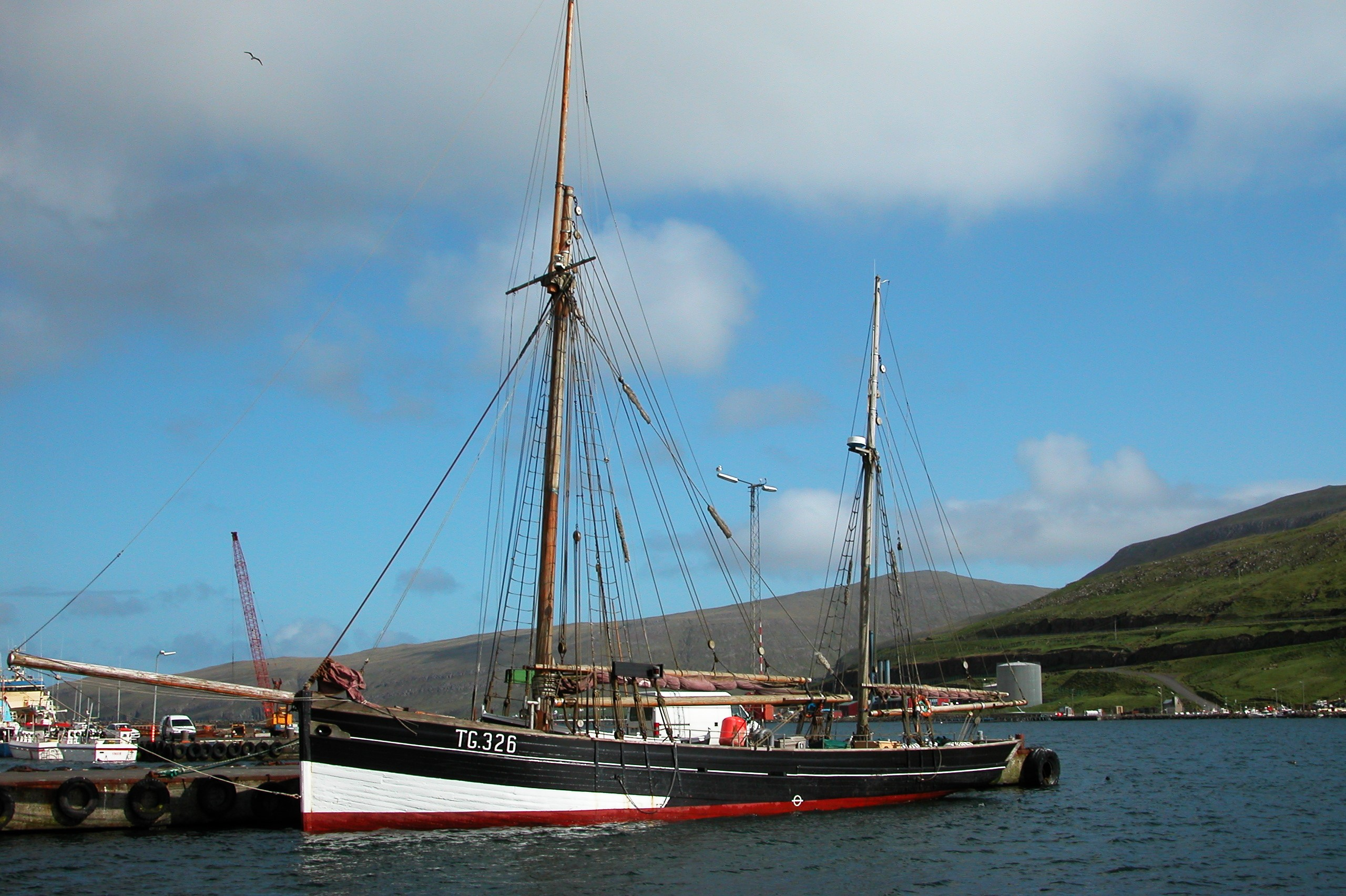
Johanna TG 326 was built in Sussex, England in 1884, but was sold to the village Vágur in the Faroe Islands in 1894, where it was a fishing vessel until around 1972. The smack was restored in the 1980s and now gives pleasure trips.

The culture of the Faroe Islands has its roots in the Nordic culture. The Faroe Islands were long isolated from the main cultural phases and movements that swept across parts of Europe. This means that they have maintained a great part of their traditional culture. The language spoken is Faroese. It is one of three insular North Germanic languages descended from the Old Norse language spoken in Scandinavia in the Viking Age, the others being Icelandic and the extinct Norn, which is thought to have been mutually intelligible with Faroese.

Until the 15th century, Faroese had a similar orthography to Icelandic and Norwegian, but after the Reformation in 1538, the ruling Danes outlawed its use in schools, churches and official documents. This maintained a rich spoken tradition, but for 300 years the language was not written down. This means that all poems and stories were handed down orally. These works were split into the following divisions: sagnir (historical), ævintyr (stories) and kvæði (ballads, often set to music and the mediaeval chain dance). These were eventually written down in the 19th century mostly by Danish scholars.

== Music and dance ==
Traditional Faroese music was primarily vocal, and was not accompanied by musical instruments. Only in Tórshavn instruments like fiddles were present in the older days. When trade grew in the 20th century the Faroese started to use imported musical instruments. Much of the imported music and instruments remained popular only in the capital and largest city, Tórshavn. Rural peoples remained true to traditions of the chain dance and ballads. The Faroese chain dance is a dance, which only survived in the Faroe Islands, while in other European countries it was banned by the church, due to its pagan origin. The dance is danced traditionally in a circle, but when a lot of people take part in the dance they usually let it swing around in various wobbles within the circle. There are no musical instruments used along with the dance, the dancers are singing ballads of various lengths, in either Faroese language or Danish, the latter of which is pronounced in Gøtudanskt. One man or woman leads the song by singing the first few words and then the others follow. The leader is called "skipari" (organizer). A ballad can be very long with a couple of hundred verses, which the skipari is expected to know by heart

The following description is by V. U. Hammershaimb, Færøsk Anthologi, 1891:

The storyline of the ballad is attended by everybody with great interest, and if something especially pleasant or moving occurs, you can see it in the look and movement of the dancers – when the rage of the battle is described, the hands are clenched together, and when victory is in hand, they make cheering movements.

Such is the importance of the dance as a cultural element that the Faroese refer to it as Faroese dance. However, it shall be stated that the dance hasn't the same popularity it once had. This especially applies to younger generations.

== Whaling ==
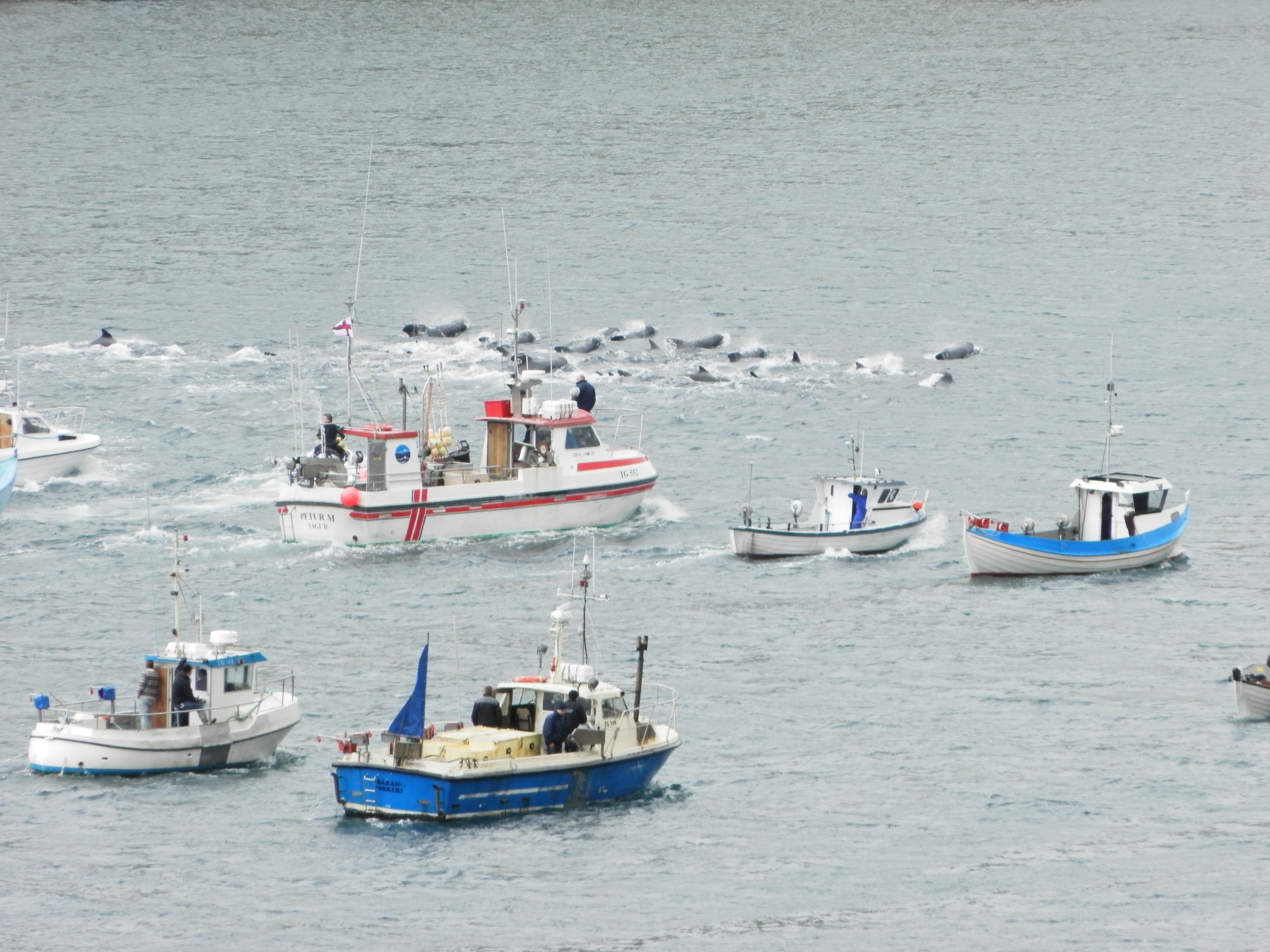
Boats driving a pod of pilot whales into a bay of Suðuroy in 2012

There are records of drive hunts in the Faroe Islands dating from 1584. Whaling in the Faroe Islands is regulated by Faroese authorities but not by the International Whaling Commission as there are disagreements about the commission's legal authority to regulate cetacean hunts. Hundreds of long-finned pilot whales (Globicephala melaena) could be killed in a year, mainly during the summer. The hunts, called grindadráp in Faroese, are non-commercial and are organized on a community level; anyone can participate. When a whale pod by chance is spotted near land the participating hunters first surround the pilot whales with a wide semicircle of boats and then slowly and quietly begin to drive the whales towards the chosen authorised bay. When a pod of whales has been stranded the killing is begun.

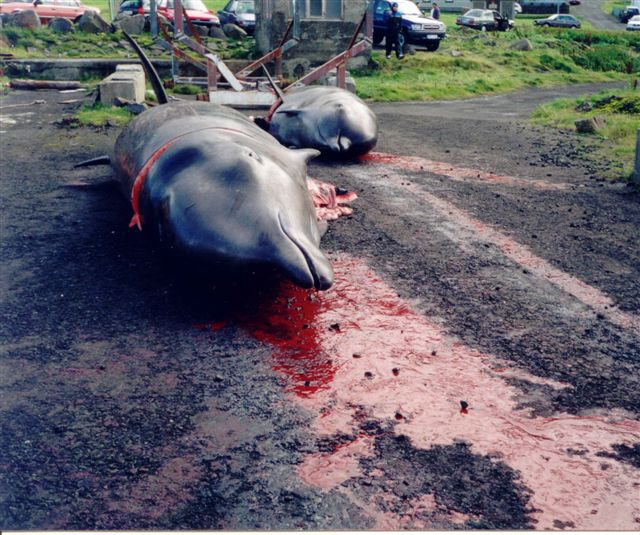
Killed pilot whales

Faroese animal welfare legislation, which also applies to whaling, requires that animals are killed as quickly and with as little suffering as possible. A regulation spinal lance is used to sever the spinal cord, which also severs the major blood supply to the brain, ensuring both loss of consciousness and death within seconds. The spinal lance has been introduced as preferred standard equipment for killing pilot whales and has been shown to reduce killing time to 1–2 seconds.

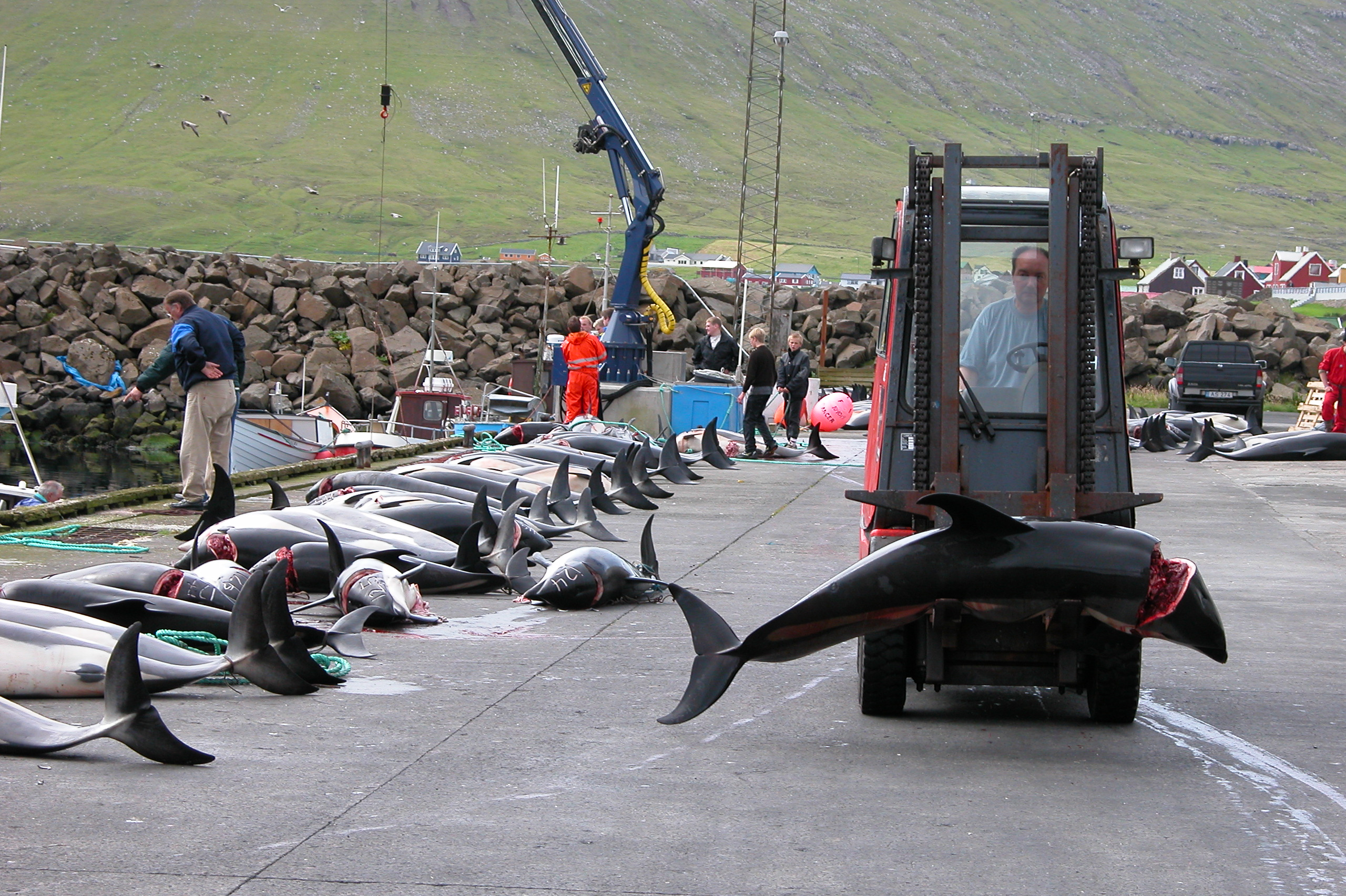
Whaling in the Faroe Islands

This "grindadráp" is legal and provides food for many people in the Faroe Islands. However, a study has found whale meat and blubber to currently be contaminated with mercury and not recommended for human consumption, as too much may cause such adverse health effects as birth defects of the nervous system, high blood pressure, damaged immune system, increased risk for developing Parkinson's disease, hypertension, arteriosclerosis, and Diabetes mellitus type 2:

Therefore we recommend that adults eat no more than one to two meals a month. Women who plan to become pregnant within three months, pregnant women, and nursing women should abstain from eating pilot whale meat. Pilot whale liver and kidneys should not be eaten at all.

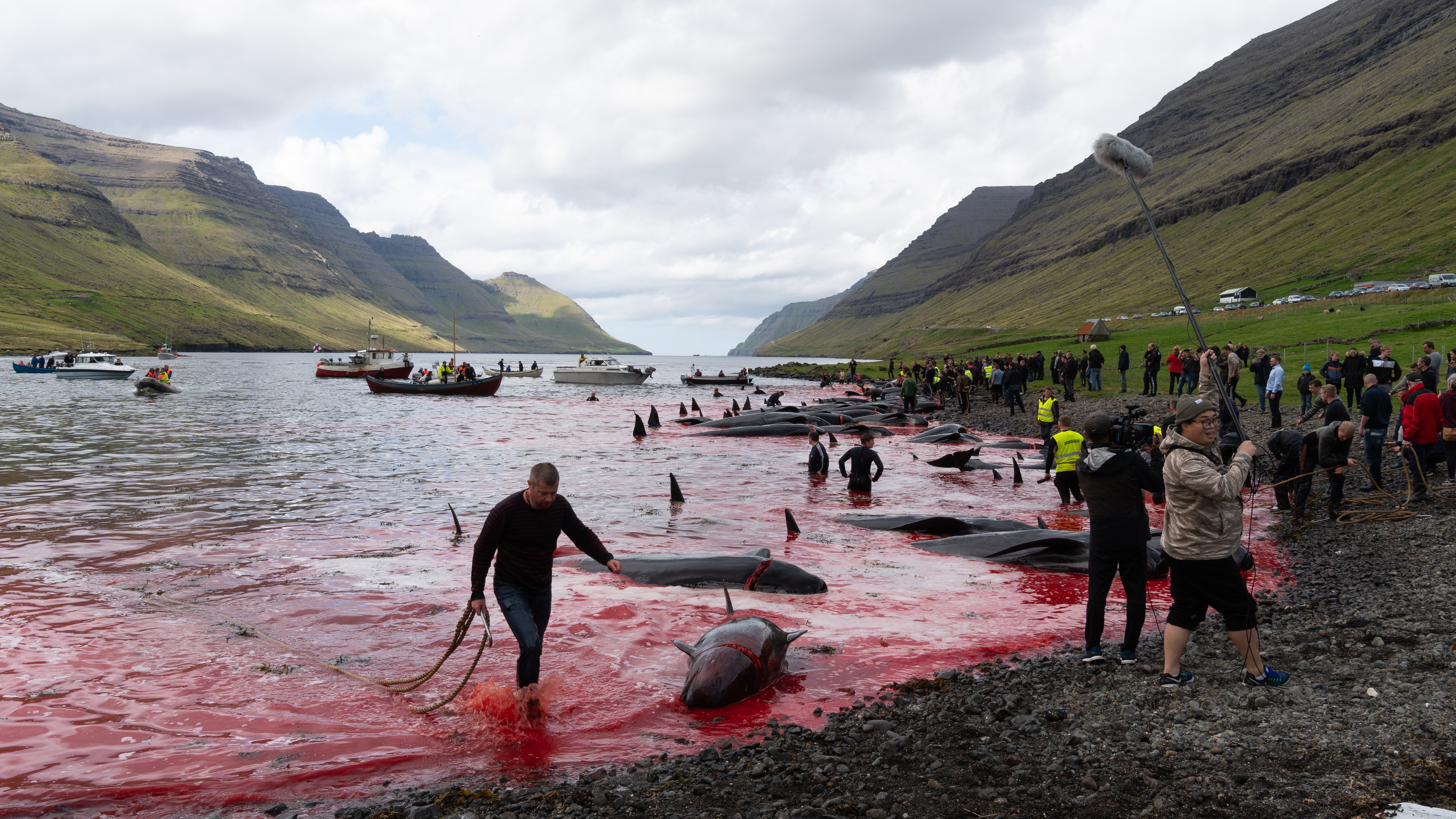
Grindadráp 2018

Animal rights groups such as the Sea Shepherd Conservation Society criticize it as being cruel and unnecessary, since it is no longer necessary as a food source for the Faroese people.

The sustainability of the Faroese pilot whale hunt has been discussed, but with a long-term average catch of around 800 pilot whales on the Faroe Islands a year the hunt is not considered to have a significant impact on the pilot whale population. There are an estimated 128,000 pilot whales in the Northeast Atlantic, and Faroese whaling is therefore considered a sustainable catch by the Faroese government. Annual records of whale drives and strandings of pilot whales and other small cetaceans provide over 400 years of documentation, including statistics, and represents one of the most comprehensive historical records of wildlife utilization anywhere in the world.

On 12 September 2021, a super-pod of over 1,420 white-sided dolphins were killed, which caused significant controversy in the Faroe Islands and abroad, leading to the government imposing quotas on the amount of white-sided dolphins allowed to be hunted each year. The UK Government declined to suspend its free-trade agreement with the Faroese, having been called upon by conservationists to do so.

== Literature and art ==
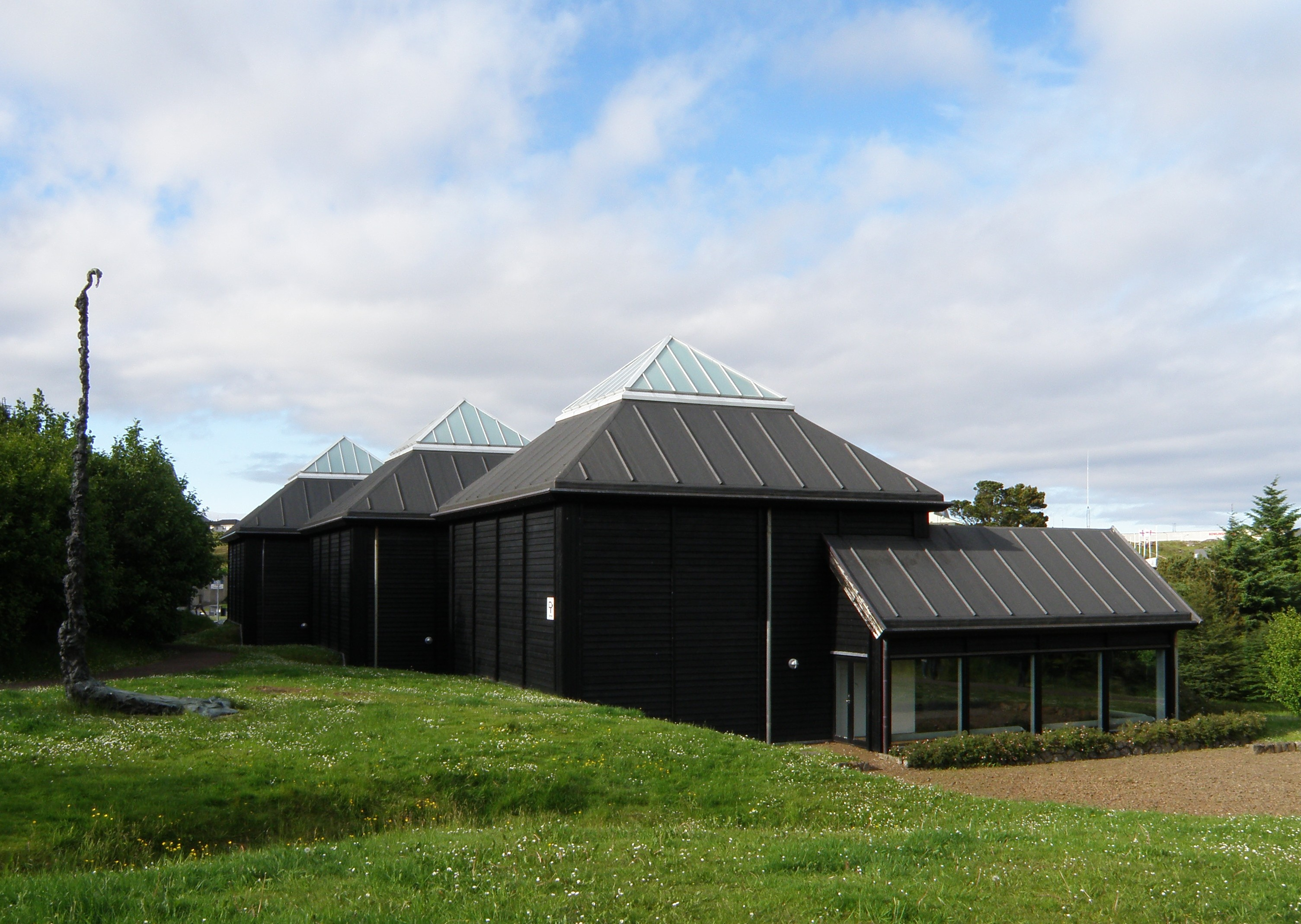
Listasavn Føroya (The National Art Museum of the Faroe Islands is in Tórshavn).

Faroese literature in the traditional sense of the word has only really developed in the past 100–200 years. This is mainly because the Faroese language was not written down in a standardised format until 1890 (in 1854 Venceslaus Ulricus Hammershaimb published a written standard for Modern Faroese that exists to this day. He produced orthography consistent with a continuous written tradition extending back to Old Norse). The Danish language was also encouraged at the expense of Faroese. Nevertheless, the Faroes have produced several authors and poets. The most famous of these authors are Jørgen-Frantz Jacobsen (known for his sole novel Barbara) and William Heinesen. Both authors wrote in Danish. Other famous authors from the Faroes include Heðin Brú (The Old Man and His Sons) and Jóanes Nielsen. Poets include the brothers Janus and Hans Andreas Djurhuus, and Rói Patursson. Both Heinesen and Patursson have been awarded The Nordic Council's Literature Prize.

As with literature, painting only really took off in the 20th century in the Faroes. Famous Faroese painters include Sámuel Joensen-Mikines, Ingálvur av Reyni, Ruth Smith, Tróndur Patursson, Steffan Danielsen and Amariel Norðoy among others.

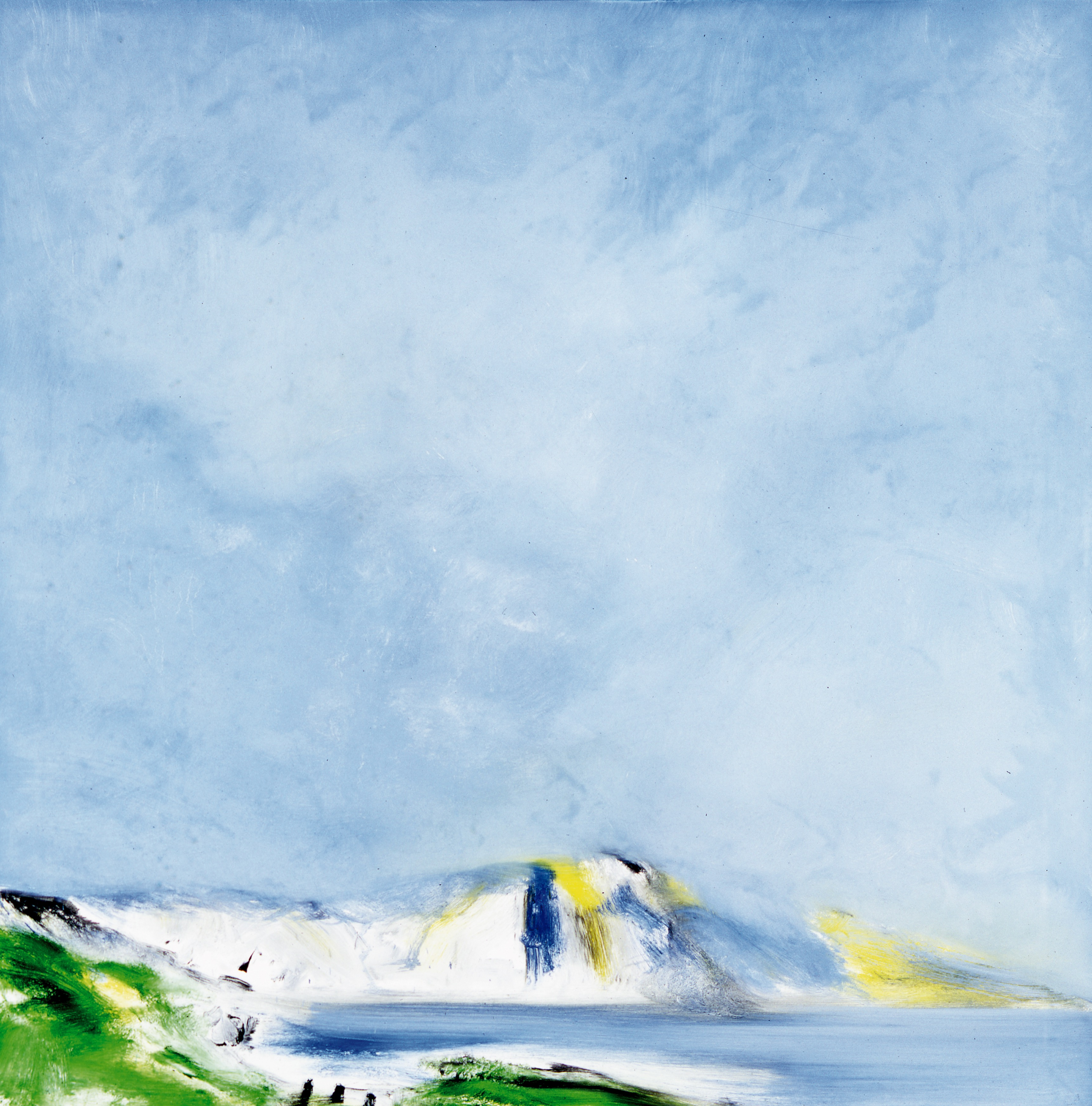
Ingo Kühl "Färöer II" from the picture cycle Färöer, 1995, oil on cotton, 120 x 120 cm

In 1995 the German painter Ingo Kühl visited the Faroes and painted a serie of pictures Färöer.

== Handcrafts ==
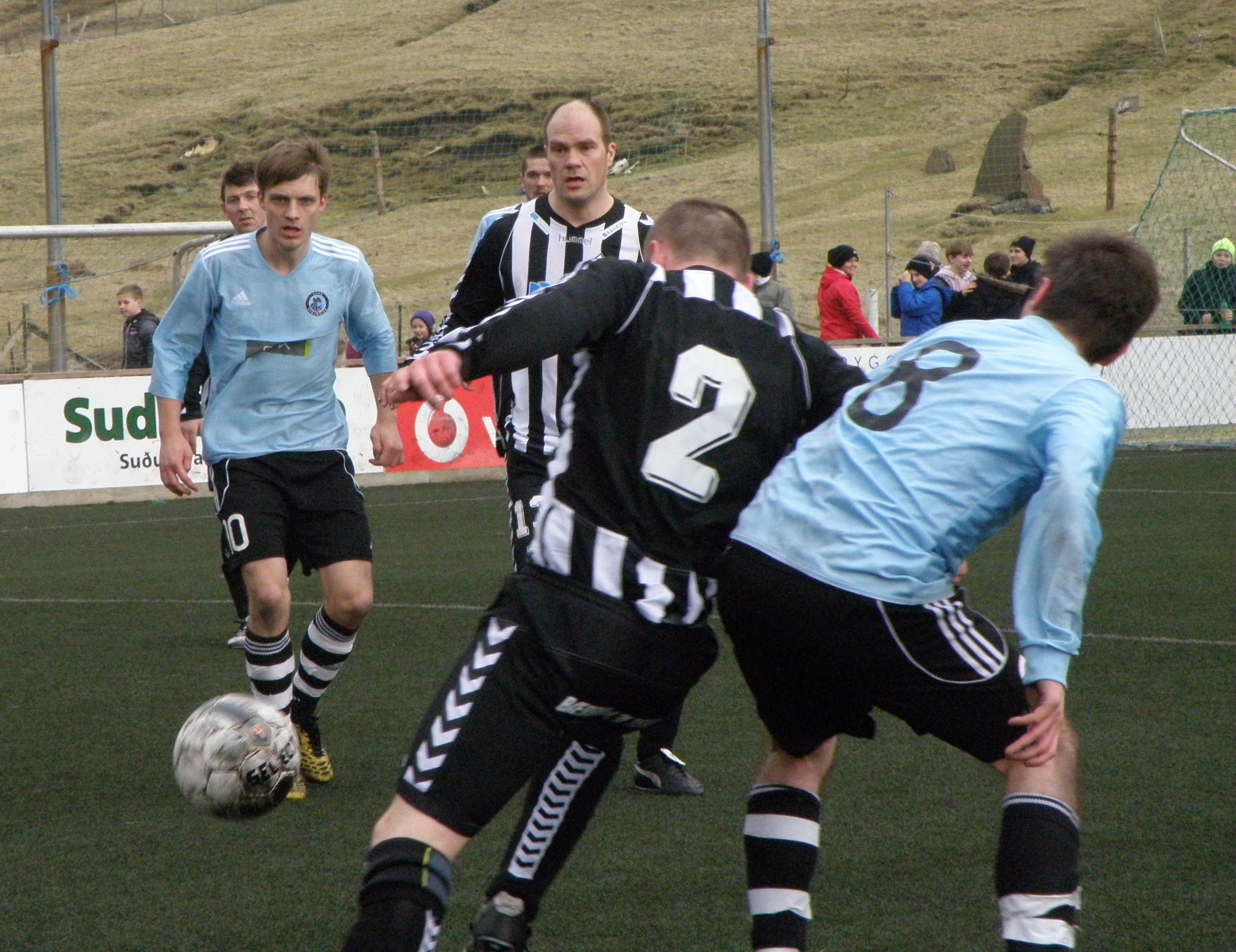
TB Tvøroyri is the oldest football club of the Faroe Islands, it was founded in 1892. Óli Johannesen (in black/white) holds the record for most capped player of the Faroe Islands national football team. Here TB plays against Víkingur Gøta.

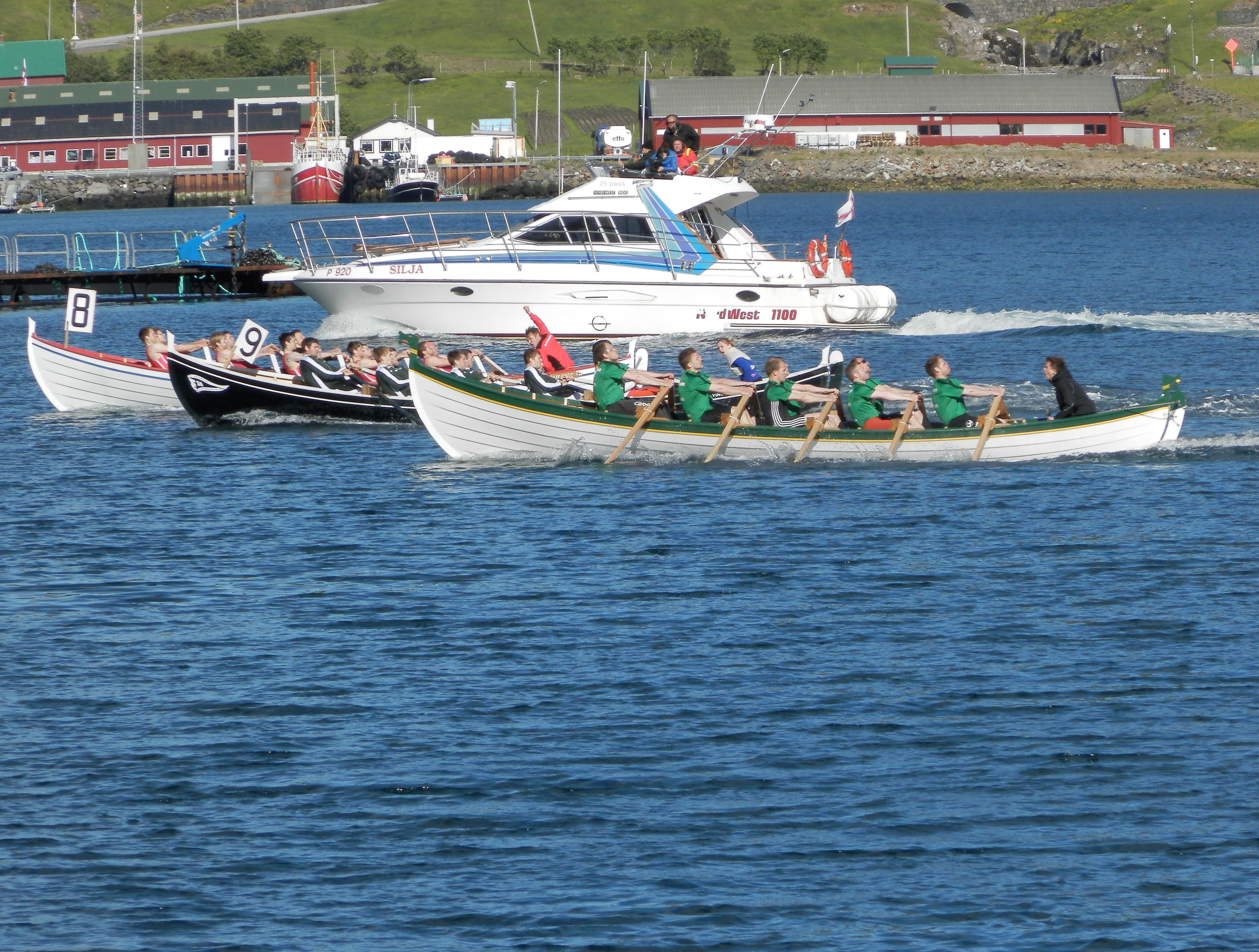
Kappróður is the Faroese word for rowing competition in wooden Faroese rowing boats. There are 7 regattas held around the islands every summer, where boats in different sizes compete. Here is the largest boat type 10-mannafør.

Lace knitting is a traditional handcraft of peoples of the Faroe Islands. The most distinguishing characteristic of Faroese lace shawls is the center back gusset shaping. Each shawl consists of two triangular side panels, a trapezoid-shaped back gusset, an edge treatment, and usually shoulder shaping.

== Sports ==
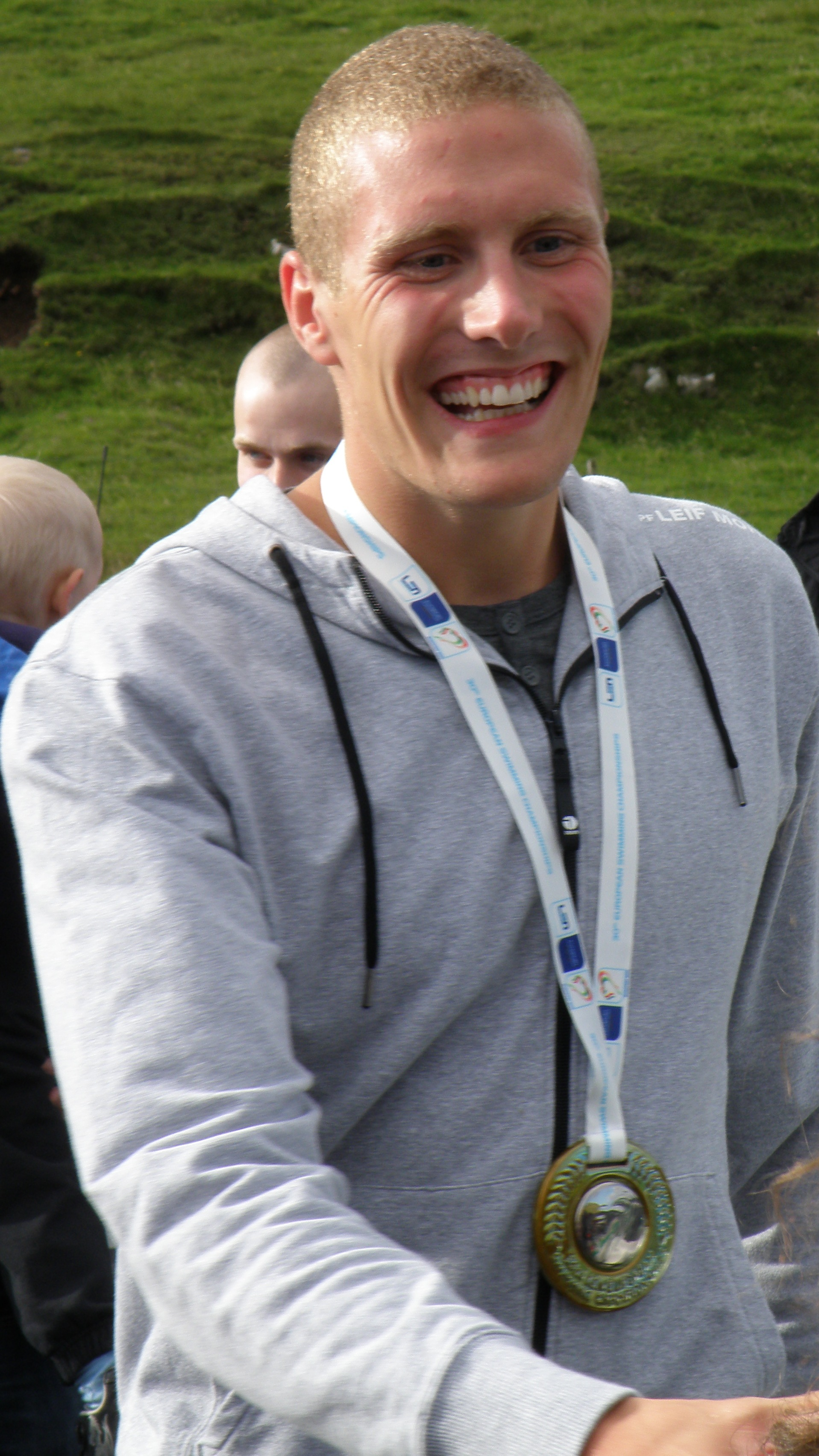
Pál Joensen after coming back home to his hometown Vágur after winning a silver medal at the 2010 European Aquatics Championships

=== Football ===
As of 1 July 2008, the Faroe Islands' international record (in UEFA European Championships qualifiers) was played 48, won 3, drawn 5, lost 40.

=== Boat race - Kappróður ===
Kappróður is the national sport of the Faroe Islands. There have been rowing competitions a long time back, at least as far back as to the 1930s, and now the competitions are still in a regular routine, held in seven different places during the weekends of June and July. The races are always part of a regional festival, called a stevna, with many other activities as well. The first regatta is always held in Klaksvík on Norðoyastevna in the first Saturday of June, sometimes it can be in the last Saturday of May. The final regatta is always held in Tórshavn on the national day, or actually on the day before the national day, which is called Ólavsøka. The boat race on Ólavsøka is the only race which is not necessarily held on a Saturday, but on the 28 July, whatever the day of the week it is. The regattas in between the Norðoyastevna and Ólavsøka are held in these locations: Jóansøka is every even year held in Vágur and every odd year in Tvøroyri, both villages are in Suðuroy (South Island), and this is the only place which is not possible to drive by car from Tórshavn, people have to take the ferry Smyril to Suðuroy, which is a two-hour journey. Jóansøka is held on a Saturday around the 24 June (St. John's Wake). Eystanstevna is always held in Runavík, but the boat race is only held there every second year (even years), odd years the regatta is held in Fuglafjørður at the Varmakelda Festival (Varmakeldustevna).

=== Swimming ===
Swimming is a quite popular sport in the Faroe Islands. The Faroese freestyle swimmer Pál Joensen is the sportsperson of the Faroe Islands with the best international result for the country, a bronze medal at the 2012 FINA World Swimming Championships. In July 2011 he qualified for the finals in the men's 800 meters and 1500 meters freestyle at the 2011 World Aquatics Championships in Shanghai. He placed fourth in the 1500 meter freestyle event, 0,67 second behind the bronze medalist. At the same competition, he placed fifth in the men's 800 meters freestyle. In 2010, Joensen won silver in the 1500 meter freestyle swimming event at the European Aquatics Championship. As of 2012, he trained in a 25 meter long pool because there was no 50 meter pool in the Faroe Islands. The first 50-meter swimming pool is under construction in Pál Joensens hometown Vágur, it is expected to open in 2015. It is named after Pál Joensen: Pálshøll

Joensen competed at the Olympics in London 2012, but he didn't make it to the finals. He competed for Denmark, because the Faroe Islands are not allowed to compete at the Olympics, as they don't accept countries which are not independent. He swam for Denmark in the men's 400m free, 1500m free and the 4 × 200 meter freestyle relay. He was the first Faroese swimmer to compete at the Olympics. Pál Joensen has moved to live and study in Denmark after finishing high school in the Faroe Islands in August 2012. Only one other Faroese athlete has participated in the Olympics, Katrin Olsen was rowing in a double sculler in 2008, also for Denmark. The Faroe Islands are allowed to compete at the Paralympics under its own flag. Faroese swimmers have represented the Faroe Islands at the Paralympics since 1984. Christina Næss won the first and only (until now 9 September 2012) gold medal for the Faroe Islands at the 1988 Summer Paralympics. Katrin Johansen, Tóra við Keldu and Heidi Andreasen have won silver or bronze medals at the Paralympics. Only one person has competed in another sport than swimming at the Paralympics for the Faroe Islands, which was in table tennis in 1992 when Heini Festirstein competed.

=== Island Games ===
The Faroe Islands compete in the biannual Island Games, which were hosted by the islands in 1989. The Faroe Islands won the games in 2009 Island Games with 34 gold medals, 23 silver and 24 bronze.

== See also ==
- Cinema of the Faroe Islands
- Faroese cuisine
- Faroese language
- Mass media in the Faroe Islands
- List of museums in the Faroe Islands
- Nordic House in the Faroe Islands
