= Faroe Islands at the Paralympics =

- IPC code: FRO
- NPC: The Faroese Sport Organisation for Disabled
- Medals: Gold 1 Silver 7 Bronze 5 Total 13

Summer appearances
- 1984; 1988; 1992; 1996; 2000; 2004; 2008; 2012; 2016; 2020; 2024

The Faroe Islands first competed at the Summer Paralympic Games in 1984, and have competed in every edition of the Summer Paralympics since then. They have never participated in the Winter Paralympic Games.

The Faroe Islands have their own National Paralympic Committee and National Olympic Committee. They are, however, one of only two territories (along with Macau) to compete at the Paralympics but not at the Olympics. Faroese athletes compete as representatives of its mother country Denmark at the Olympic Games.

Faroese Paralympians have won a total of thirteen medals, including one gold, seven silver and five bronze. Their most successful appearance was at the 1988 Games, where they won seven medals and Christina Næss won the Faroe Islands' first and only Paralympic gold medal, in the C3 100m backstroke in swimming.

The Faroe Islands have only ever sent swimmers to the Paralympics, with the exceptions of Heini Festirstein, who competed in table tennis in 1992, and Hávard Vatnhamar, who competed in the marathon (athletics) in 2020.

== List of medalists ==
Medal	Name	Games	Sport	Event
Bronze	Katrin Johansen	1988 Seoul	Swimming	100m backstroke C8
Silver	Katrin Johansen	1988 Seoul	Swimming	100m freestyle C8
Gold	Christina Næss	1988 Seoul	Swimming	100m backstroke C3
Silver	Christina Næss	1988 Seoul	Swimming	400m freestyle C3-4
Bronze	Tóra við Keldu	1988 Seoul	Swimming	100m butterfly L6
Bronze	Tóra við Keldu	1988 Seoul	Swimming	400m butterfly L6
Silver	Tóra við Keldu	1988 Seoul	Swimming	100m freestyle L6
Silver	Tóra við Keldu	1992 Barcelona	Swimming	100m freestyle S10
Bronze	Heidi Andreasen	2000 Sydney	Swimming	100m backstroke S8
Silver	Heidi Andreasen	2000 Sydney	Swimming	100m freestyle S8
Silver	Heidi Andreasen	2000 Sydney	Swimming	400m freestyle S8
Silver	Heidi Andreasen	2000 Sydney	Swimming	50m freestyle S8
Bronze	Heidi Andreasen	2004 Athens	Swimming	400m freestyle S8

=== Medals by Summer sport ===
Sport	Gold	Silver	Bronze	Total
Swimming	1	7	5	13
Totals (1 entries)	1	7	5	13

|

== See also ==
- Faroese Confederation of Sports & Olympic Committee
- Football in the Faroe Islands
- Sport in Macau
