= Swimming at the 2007 Parapan American Games =

Paralympic swimming at the 2007 Parapan American Games
- Venue: City of Sports Complex
- Dates: 13 – 18 August 2007

Paralympic swimming at the 2007 Parapan American Games in Rio de Janeiro, Brazil took place between 13 and 18 August 2007 at the City of Sports Complex.

== Medal table ==
Canada topped the medal table with 87 medals, the host country Brazil in second place and USA in third. Daniel Dias won eight gold medals in the Games.

* Host nation (Brazil)

Rank	Nation	Gold	Silver	Bronze	Total
1	Canada (CAN)	41	28	18	87
2	Brazil (BRA)	39	30	39	108
3	United States (USA)	15	25	17	57
4	Mexico (MEX)	13	20	22	55
5	Argentina (ARG)	4	6	12	22
6	Cuba (CUB)	4	6	2	12
7	Peru (PER)	3	0	0	3
8	Colombia (COL)	2	5	3	10
9	Venezuela (VEN)	2	2	6	10
Totals (9 entries)		123	122	119	364

== Medalists ==
=== Men ===
Event	Gold	Silver	Bronze
50m freestyle S3	Jaime Eulert; Peru	Cristopher Tronco; Mexico	None
50m freestyle S4	Clodoaldo Silva; Brazil	Juan Ignacio Reyes; Mexico	Arnulfo Castorena; Mexico
50m freestyle S5	Daniel Dias; Brazil	Moisés Fuentes; Colombia	Alfonso Nuñez; Mexico
50m freestyle S6	Adriano Lima; Brazil	Luis Silva; Brazil	Rafael Castillo Álvarez; Cuba
50m freestyle S7	Wagner Pires da Silva; Brazil	Ronaldo Santos; Brazil	José Medeiros; Brazil
50m freestyle S8	Drew Christensen; Canada	Gledson Soares; Brazil	Isidoro Mazotini; Brazil
50m freestyle S9	Mauro Brasil; Brazil	Michael Prout; United States	Cody Bureau; United States
50m freestyle S10	André Esteves; Brazil	Benoit Huot; Canada	Danilo Glasser; Brazil
50m freestyle S11	Donovan Tildesley; Canada	Rodrigo Ribeiro; Brazil	Fábio Cruz; Brazil
50m freestyle S12	Dieter Morales Niebla; Cuba	Pedro Gonzalez; Venezuela	Yuan Cantero Castillo; Cuba
50m freestyle S13	Carlos Farrenberg; Brazil	Brian Hill; Canada	David Rangel; Venezuela
100m freestyle S3	Jaime Eulert; Peru	Genezi Andrade; Brazil	Cristopher Tronco; Mexico
100m freestyle S4	Clodoaldo Silva; Brazil	Juan Ignacio Reyes; Mexico	Arnulfo Castorena; Mexico
100m freestyle S5	Daniel Dias; Brazil	Moisés Fuentes; Colombia	Francisco Avelino; Brazil
100m freestyle S6	Adriano Lima; Brazil	Luis Silva; Brazil	Diego Pastore; Argentina
100m freestyle S7	Wagner Pires da Silva; Brazil	José Medeiros; Brazil	Ronaldo Santos; Brazil
100m freestyle S8	Gledson Soares; Brazil	Tom Miazga; United States	Isidoro Mazotinini; Brazil
100m freestyle S9	Michael Prout; United States	Mauro Brasil; Brazil	Cody Bureau; United States
100m freestyle S10	André Esteves; Brazil	Benoit Huot; Canada	Marcelo Collet; Brazil
100m freestyle S11	Donovan Tildesley; Canada	Rodrigo Ribeiro; Brazil	Fábio Cruz; Brazil
100m freestyle S12	Pedro Gonzalez; Venezuela	Dieter Morales Niebla; Cuba	Miguel Otero; Colombia
100m freestyle S13	Carlos Farrenberg; Brazil	Brian Hill; Canada	Devin Gotell; Canada
200m freestyle S4	Clodoaldo Silva; Brazil	Juan Ignacio Reyes; Mexico	Arnulfo Castorena; Mexico
200m freestyle S5	Daniel Dias; Brazil	Moisés Fuentes; Colombia	Sebastian Ramirez; Argentina
400m freestyle S6	Adriano Lima; Brazil	Diego Pastore; Argentina	Ivanildo Vasconcelos; Brazil
400m freestyle S7	Alex Dionne; United States	Ronaldo Santos; Brazil	José Medeiros; Brazil
400m freestyle S8	Drew Christensen; Canada	Tom Miazga; United States	Isidoro Mazotini; Brazil
400m freestyle S9	Michael Prout; United States	Brad Sales; Canada	Andrew Haley; Canada
400m freestyle S10	André Esteves; Brazil	Benoit Huot; Canada	Marcelo Collet; Brazil
400m freestyle S11	Donovan Tildesley; Canada	Fábio Cruz; Brazil	André Meneghetti; Brazil
400m freestyle S12	Miguel Otero; Colombia	Ignacio Gonzalez; Argentina	Renato Silva; Brazil
400m freestyle S13	Carlos Farrenberg; Brazil	Devin Gotell; Canada	None
50m backstroke S3	Jaime Eulert; Peru	Genezi Andrade; Brazil	Cristopher Tronco; Mexico
50m backstroke S4	Juan Ignacio Reyes; Mexico	Clodoaldo Silva; Brazil	Joon Seo Sok; Brazil
50m backstroke S5	Daniel Dias; Brazil	Francisco Avelino; Brazil	Ariel Quassi; Argentina
100m backstroke S6	Rafael Castillo Álvarez; Cuba	Diego Pastore; Argentina	Ivanildo Vasconcelos; Brazil
100m backstroke S7	Guillermo Marro; Argentina	Nélio Almeida; Brazil	Ronaldo Santos; Brazil
100m backstroke S8	Tom Miazga; United States	Gledson Soares; Brazil	Miguel Oropeza; Venezuela
100m backstroke S9	Michael Prout; United States	Cody Bureau; United States	Brad Sales; Canada
100m backstroke S10	Benoit Huot; Canada	André Esteves; Brazil	Jourdan Lutkus; Brazil
100m backstroke S11	Sergio Zayas; Argentina	Yunieski Ortega Ponce; Cuba	Felipe Oliveira; Brazil
100m backstroke S12	Ignacio Gonzalez; Argentina	Pedro Gonzalez; Venezuela	Jorge Arcadio Campos; Mexico
100m backstroke S13	Brian Hill; Canada	Devin Gotell; Canada	Gilberto Neto; Brazil
50m breaststroke SB2	Arnulfo Castorena; Mexico	Cristopher Tronco; Mexico	Genezi Andrade; Brazil
50m breaststroke SB3	Clodoaldo Silva; Brazil	Omar Osorio; Mexico	Moisés Batista; Brazil
100m breaststroke SB4	Daniel Dias; Brazil	Moisés Fuentes; Colombia	Ivanildo Vasconcelos; Brazil
100m breaststroke SB5	Adriano Lima; Brazil	Alejandro Silva; Mexico	Baudel Calvillo Castorena; Mexico
100m breaststroke SB6	Danielson Pontes; Brazil	Gledson Soares; Brazil	Nélio Almeida; Brazil
100m breaststroke SB8	Facundo Lazo; Argentina	Drew Christensen; Canada	Edilver Rosendo; Venezuela
100m breaststroke SB9	Benoit Huot; Canada	Cody Bureau; United States	André Esteves; Brazil
100m breaststroke SB11	Leon Adonis Aguilar; Cuba	Felipe Oliveira; Brazil	Vladimir Martinez; Mexico
100m breaststroke SB12	Renato Silva; Brazil	Yuan Cantero Castillo; Cuba	Pedro Gonzalez; Venezuela
100m breaststroke SB13	Carlos Farrenberg; Brazil	None	None
50m butterfly S4	Clodoalda Silva; Brazil	Juan Ignacio Reyes; Mexico	Arnulfo Castorena; Mexico
50m butterfly S6	Daniel Dias; Brazil	Adriano Lima; Brazil	Santi Trissini; Venezuela
50m butterfly S7	Nélio Almeida; Brazil	José Medeiros; Brazil	Alex Dionne; United States
100m butterfly S9	Cody Bureau; United States	Michael Prout; United States	Andrew Haley; Canada
100m butterfly S10	André Esteves; Brazil	Benoit Huot; Canada	Marcelo Collet; Brazil
100m butterfly S11	Donovan Tildesley; Canada	Leon Adonis Aguilar; Cuba	André Meneghetti; Brazil
100m butterfly S13	Brian Hill; Canada	Dieter Morales Niebla; Cuba	Gilberto Neto; Brazil
150m individual medley SM3	Juan Ignacio Reyes; Mexico	Arnulfo Castorena; Mexico	Genezi Andrade; Brazil
150m individual medley SM4	Clodoaldo Silva; Brazil	Sebastian Ramirez; Argentina	Moisés Batista; Brazil
200m individual medley SM6	Adriano Lima; Brazil	Ivanildo Vasconcelos; Brazil	Alejandro Silva; Mexico
200m individual medley SM8	Drew Christensen; Canada	Gledson Soares; Brazil	Tom Miazga; United States
200m individual medley SM9	Michael Prout; United States	Cody Bureau; United States	Andrew Haley; Canada
200m individual medley SM10	Benoit Huot; Canada	Jourdan Lutkus; Brazil	Giovanni Mendoza; Mexico
200m individual medley SM11	Donovan Tildesley; Canada	Leon Adonis Aguilar; Cuba	Vladimir Martinez; Mexico
200m individual medley SM12	Dieter Morales Niebla; Cuba	Miguel Otero; Colombia	Kevin Cruz Lujan; Mexico
200m individual medley SM13	Brian Hill; Canada	Carlos Farrenberg; Brazil	Devin Gotell; Canada
4 × 100 m freestyle relay 34pts	Brazil (BRA); Adriano Lima; Fabiano Machado; Mauro Brasil; André Esteves	United States (USA); Tom Miazga; Alex Dionne; Michael Prout; Cody Bureau	Argentina (ARG); Facundo Lazo; Marco Pulleiro; Guillermo Marro; Juan Pablo Rosatti
4x50m medley relay 20pts	Brazil (BRA); Daniel Dias; Adriano Lima; Luis Silva; Clodoaldo Silva	Mexico (MEX); Juan Ignacio Reyes; Arnulfo Castorena; Giovanni Mendoza; Raul Cuevas	Argentina (ARG); Diego Pastore; Sebastian Ramirez; Ariel Quassi; Alejandro Arzubialde
4 × 100 m medley relay 34pts	Brazil (BRA); Daniel Dias; Jourdan Lutkus; André Esteves; Marcelo Collet	Argentina (ARG); Guillermo Marro; Facundo Lazo; Marco Pulleiro; Juan Pablo Rosatti	United States (USA); Tom Miazga; Cody Bureau; Michael Prout; Alex Dionne

=== Women ===
Event	Gold	Silver	Bronze
50m freestyle S3	Patricia Valle; Mexico	Fabiola Ramirez; Mexico	Elizabeth Kolbe; United States
50m freestyle S5	Edênia Garcia; Brazil	Nadia Porras; Mexico	Sofia Olmos; Mexico
50m freestyle S6	Doramitzi Gonzalez; Mexico	Miranda Uhl; United States	Casey Johnson; United States
50m freestyle S8	Amanda Everlove; United States	Andrea Cole; Canada	Laura Jensen; Canada
50m freestyle S9	Stephanie Dixon; Canada	Darda Geiger; Canada	Katarina Roxon; Canada
50m freestyle S10	Anne Polinario; Canada	Susan Beth Scott; United States	Jessica Hodgins; Canada
50m freestyle S11	Fabiana Sugimori; Brazil	Jessica Tuomela; Canada	Nadia Baez; Argentina
50m freestyle S13	Chelsey Gotell; Canada	Kirby Cote; Canada	Belkys Mota; Venezuela
100m freestyle S3	Patricia Valle; Mexico	Elizabeth Kolbe; United States	Fabiola Ramirez; Mexico
100m freestyle S5	Nadia Porras; Mexico	Sofia Olmos; Mexico	Edênia Garcia; Brazil
100m freestyle S6	Miranda Uhl; United States	Doramitzi Gonzalez; Mexico	Casey Johnson; United States
100m freestyle S8	Andrea Cole; Canada	Laura Jensen; Canada	Valéria Lira; Brazil
100m freestyle S9	Darda Geiger; Canada	Stephanie Dixon; Canada	Brittany Gray; Canada
100m freestyle S10	Anne Polinario; Canada	Susan Beth Scott; United States	Jessica Hodgins; Canada
100m freestyle S11	Fabiana Sugimori; Brazil	Jessica Tuomela; Canada	Nadia Baez; Argentina
100m freestyle S13	Valerie Grand-Maison; Canada	Chelsey Gotell; Canada	Kirby Cote; Canada
200m freestyle S3	Patricia Valle; Mexico	Elizabeth Kolbe; United States	Betiana Basualdo; Argentina
200m freestyle S5	Nadia Porras; Mexico	Nely Miranda; Mexico	Edênia Garcia; Brazil
400m freestyle S6	Miranda Uhl; United States	Doramitzi Gonzalez; Mexico	Casey Johnson; United States
400m freestyle S8	Andrea Cole; Canada	Valéria Lira; Brazil	Laura Jensen; Canada
400m freestyle S9	Stephanie Dixon; Canada	Darda Geiger; Canada	Brittany Gray; Canada
400m freestyle S10	Susan Beth Scott; United States	Anne Polinario; Canada	Jessica Hodgins; Canada
400m freestyle S12	Jacqueline Rennebohm; Canada	Regiane Silva; Brazil	Fabiana Sugimori; Brazil
400m freestyle S13	Valerie Grand-Maison; Canada	Chelsey Gotell; Canada	Carrie Willoughby; United States
50m backstroke S3	Elizabeth Kolbe; United States	Fabiola Ramirez; Mexico	Betiana Basualdo; Argentina
50m backstroke S5	Edênia Garcia; Brazil	Nadia Porras; Mexico	Rildene Firmino; Brazil
100m backstroke S6	Doramitzi Gonzalez; Mexico	Miranda Uhl; United States	Casey Johnson; United States
100m backstroke S8	Andrea Cole; Canada	Amanda Everlove; United States	Sarah Hunt; United States
100m backstroke S9	Stephanie Dixon; Canada	Darda Geiger; Canada	Kate Gibbs; United States
100m backstroke S10	Anne Polinario; Canada	Susan Beth Scott; United States	Jessica Hodgins; Canada
100m backstroke S11	Jessica Tuomela; Canada	Nadia Baez; Argentina	Rosario Gomez Vasco; Colombia
100m backstroke S13	Chelsey Gotell; Canada	Carrie Willoughby; United States	Regiane Silva; Brazil
50m breaststroke SB3	Patricia Valle; Mexico	Rildene Firmino; Brazil	Virginia Hernandez; Mexico
100m breaststroke SB4	Naiver Ome; Colombia	Leticia Perez; Mexico	None
100m breaststroke SB6	Miranda Uhl; United States	Casey Johnson; United States	Velia Flores; Mexico
100m breaststroke SB8	Brittany Gray; Canada	Katarina Roxon; Canada	Kate Gibbs; United States
100m breaststroke SB11	Jessica Tuomela; Canada	Fabiana Sugimori; Brazil	Rosario Gomez Vasco; Colombia
100m breaststroke SB13	Kirby Cote; Canada	Valerie Grand-Maison; Canada	Anabel Moro; Argentina
50m butterfly S5	Sofia Olmos; Mexico	Ana Moreno Vera; Mexico	Leticia Perez; Mexico
50m butterfly S6	Miranda Uhl; United States	Casey Johnson; United States	Doramitzi Gonzalez; Mexico
100m butterfly S9	Brittany Gray; Canada	Kate Gibbs; United States	Daniela Gimenez; Argentina
100m butterfly S13	Valerie Grand-Maison; Canada	Kirby Cote; Canada	Carrie Willoughby; United States
150m individual medley SM4	Patricia Valle; Mexico	Rildene Firmino; Brazil	Claudia Silva; Brazil
200m individual medley SM6	Miranda Uhl; United States	Casey Johnson; United States	Doramitzi Gonzalez; Mexico
200m individual medley SM8	Andrea Cole; Canada	Amanda Everlove; United States	Sarah Hunt; United States
200m individual medley SM9	Stephanie Dixon; Canada	Katarina Roxon; Canada	Kate Gibbs; United States
200m individual medley SM10	Anne Polinario; Canada	Susan Beth Scott; United States	Jessica Hodgins; Canada
200m individual medley SM12	Belkys Mota; Venezuela	Jacqueline Rennebohm; Canada	Anabel Moro; Argentina
200m individual medley SM13	Valerie Grand-Maison; Canada	Kirby Cote; Canada	Chelsey Gotell; Canada
4 × 100 m freestyle relay 34pts	Canada (CAN); Darda Geiger; Brittany Gray; Stephanie Dixon; Laura Jensen	United States (USA); Sarah Hunt; Amanda Everlove; Kate Gibbs; Susan Beth Scott	Brazil (BRA); Ana Clara Cruz; Valéria Lira; Gabriela Cantagallo; Tassia Alves
4 × 100 m medley relay 34pts	Canada (CAN); Stephanie Dixon; Katarina Roxon; Brittany Gray; Andrea Cole	United States (USA); Susan Beth Scott; Kate Gibbs; Amanda Everlove; Miranda Uhl	Mexico (MEX); Doramitzi Gonzalez; Velia Flores; Martha Medel; Maria Hernandez

== See also ==
- Swimming at the 2007 Pan American Games
