= Culture of Scandinavia (disambiguation) =

Culture of Scandinavia encompasses the cultures of the Scandinavia region of Europe, as well as cultures of the neighboring Nordic countries.

Culture of Scandinavia may also refer to:

- History of Scandinavia, history of Scandinavia and the Nordic countries
- Scandinavian prehistory, earlier cultures in the region from the end of the last ice age until the start of written history
  - Iron Age Scandinavia (c. 500 BCE–800 CE)
  - Nordic Bronze Age (c. 1700 BCE–500 BCE)
  - Nordic Stone Age (c. 12,000 BCE–1700 BCE)
