= Faroe Islands at the 2020 Summer Paralympics =

- IPC code: FRO
- NPC: The Faroese Sport Organisation for Disabled

in Tokyo
- Competitors: 1 in 1 sport
- Flag bearer: Hávard Vatnhamar
- Medals: Gold 0 Silver 0 Bronze 0 Total 0

Summer appearances
- 1984 • 1988 • 1992 • 1996 • 2000 • 2004 • 2008 • 2012 • 2016 • 2020

Faroe Islands competed at the 2020 Summer Paralympics in Tokyo, Japan, from 24 August to 5 September 2021. The swimmer Hávard Vatnhamar was their sole representative at this edition of the Paralympics.

== Athletics ==
Track

Athlete	Event	Final	
Athlete	Event	Result	Rank
Hávard Vatnhamar	Men's marathon T46	2:58:27	10

== See also ==
- Faroe Islands at the Paralympics
