= Faroe Islands at the 1988 Summer Paralympics =

- IPC code: FRO
- NPC: The Faroese Sport Organisation for Disabled

in Seoul
- Competitors: 4 in 1 sport
- Medals Ranked 34th: Gold 1 Silver 3 Bronze 3 Total 7

Summer Paralympics appearances (overview)
- 1984; 1988; 1992; 1996; 2000; 2004; 2008; 2012; 2016; 2020; 2024

The Faroe Islands competed at the 1988 Summer Paralympics in Seoul, South Korea. The islands' delegation consisted of four swimmers: Katrin Johansen, Christina Næss, Johan Samuelsen and Tóra við Keldu.

The 1988 Games were the Faroe Islands' most successful Paralympics ever. Faroese swimmers won the islands' first and so far only Paralympic gold medal, and also won more medals than at any other Games so far.

== Medallists ==
Medal	Name	Sport	Event
Gold	Christina Næss	Swimming	Women's 100 m Backstroke C3
Silver	Katrin Johansen	Swimming	Women's 100 m Freestyle C8
Silver	Christina Næss	Swimming	Women's 400 m Freestyle C3-4
Silver	Tóra við Keldu	Swimming	Women's 100 m Freestyle L6
Bronze	Katrin Johansen	Swimming	Women's 100 m Backstroke C8
Bronze	Tóra við Keldu	Swimming	Women's 100 m Butterfly L6
Bronze	Tóra við Keldu	Swimming	Women's 400 m Freestyle L6

== See also ==
- Faroe Islands at the Paralympics
