= Faroe Islands at the 2008 Summer Paralympics =

- IPC code: FRO
- NPC: The Faroese Sport Organisation for Disabled

in Beijing
- Competitors: 1 in 1 sport
- Flag bearer: Heidi Andreasen
- Medals: Gold 0 Silver 0 Bronze 0 Total 0

Summer Paralympics appearances (overview)
- 1984; 1988; 1992; 1996; 2000; 2004; 2008; 2012; 2016; 2020; 2024

The Faroe Islands competed at the 2008 Summer Paralympics in Beijing, China. The team consisted of a single competitor, Heidi Andreasen, who took part in four swimming events, but did not win a medal.

== Swimming ==
| Athlete | Class | Event | Heats | | Final | |
| Athlete | Class | Event | Result | Rank | Result | Rank |
|---|---|---|---|---|---|---|
| Heidi Andreasen | S8 | 50m freestyle | 33.20 | 8 Q | 32.66 | 8 |
| Heidi Andreasen | S8 | 100m freestyle | 1:12.77 | 7 Q | 1:11.99 | 6 |
| Heidi Andreasen | S8 | 400m freestyle | 5:35.51 | 5 Q | 5:20.54 | 4 |
| Heidi Andreasen | SM8 | 200m individual medley | 3:00.70 | 7 Q | 2:59.00 | 7 |

== See also ==
- Faroe Islands at the Paralympics
