= Christina Næss =

Faroese para swimmer

Sport
- Sport: Swimming
- Strokes: Freestyle, backstroke
- Classifications: C3
Medal record
Representing Faroe Islands
Swimming
Paralympic Games
Gold medal – first place	1988 Seoul	100m backstroke C3
Silver medal – second place	1988 Seoul	400m freestyle C3-4

Christina Næss іѕ a para swimmer who competed for the Faroe Islands. She is classified and competes in the C3 category.

She competed for the Faroe Islands at the 1988 Summer Paralympics, where she won the territory's first Paralympic gold medal, in the women's 100 metre backstroke C3 event. She also competed in the women's 400 metre freestyle C3–C4 event, winning the silver medal. Næss would become the most successful Paralympian to compete for the nation.

== Biography ==
Christina Næss is a para swimmer that competed for the Faroe Islands at the Summer Paralympics in the C3 category.

Næss competed for the Faroe Islands at the 1988 Summer Paralympics which were held in Seoul, South Korea. The swimming events were held at the Jamsil Indoor Swimming Pool. She first competed in the women's 100 metre backstroke C3 event against five other swimmers, namely Catherine Huggett of Australia, Anne Trotman of Great Britain, Susan Edwards and Wendy Shugol of the United States, and Sigrun Petursdottir of Iceland. In the competition, she won the gold medal for the Faroe Islands in a time of 2:21.68. There, Næss won the first Paralympic gold medal for the Faroe Islands and its only gold medal as of the Islands' last participation at the 2020 Summer Paralympics in Tokyo, Japan.

Her next competition was the women's 400 metre freestyle C3–C4 event and competed against Huggett, Petursdottir, Shugol, Victoria Williams of the United States, and Jane Stidever of Great Britain. There, Næss finished with a time of 8:07.50 and place second, winning the silver medal behind Stidever. This edition of the Summer Paralympics was the only edition that Næss has competed in. According to the International Paralympic Committee, this edition of the Summer Paralympics was the Faroe Islands' most successful as the team had won a gold medal through her. Næss is also the most successful Paralympian in individual events for the Islands, but not the most bemedaled one as swimmer Heidi Andreasen won more but did not win a gold.
