= Faroe Islands at the 2012 Summer Paralympics =

- IPC code: FRO
- NPC: The Faroese Sport Organisation for Disabled

in London
- Competitors: 1 in 1 sport
- Flag bearer: Ragnvaldur Joensen
- Medals: Gold 0 Silver 0 Bronze 0 Total 0

Summer Paralympics appearances (overview)
- 1984; 1988; 1992; 1996; 2000; 2004; 2008; 2012; 2016; 2020; 2024

The Faroe Islands sent a delegation to compete in the 2012 Summer Paralympics in London, United Kingdom, from 29 August to 9 September 2012. This was the nation's eighth time competing in a Summer Paralympic Games. The Faroese delegation consisted of one swimmer, Ragnvaldur Jensen. In his only event, the men's 100 meter breaststroke (SB14), he finished seventh in his heat and failed to qualify for the finals.

== Background ==
The Faroe Islands, a self-governing territory of the Kingdom of Denmark, first joined the Paralympic competition at the 1984 Summer Paralympics. The Faroe Islands do not compete in the Olympic Games under their own flag, rather Faroese competitors at the Olympics must compete as part of the Danish team. The Islands have participated in every Summer Paralympics since then, but have never participated in the Winter Paralympics. All 13 of the Faroe Islands' medals have been in the sport of swimming. The 2012 Summer Paralympics were held from 29 August to 9 September 2012 with a total of 4,237 athletes representing 164 National Paralympic Committees taking part. The Faroese delegation to London consisted of a single swimmer, Ragnvaldur Jensen. He was the territory's flag-bearer during the Games' opening ceremony.

== Swimming ==
Ragnvaldur Jensen was 22 years old at the time of the London Paralympics, and was classified as SB14. SB14 is described by the International Paralympic Committee as "S14 swimmers have an intellectual impairment, which typically leads to the athletes having difficulties with regards to pattern recognition, sequencing, and memory, or having a slower reaction time, which impact on sport performance in general. Moreover, S14 swimmers show a higher number of strokes relative to their speed than able-bodied elite swimmers." On 6 September, he was drawn into heat one of the men's 100 meter breaststroke SB14, finishing with a time of 1 minute and 13.92 seconds, which put him in seventh place out of eight swimmers in his heat. Only the top eight between both heats could advance to the finals, and Jensen was eliminated from the competition. Yasuhiro Tanaka of Japan eventually won the gold medal, with Artem Pavlenko of Russia taking silver and the bronze went to Marc Evers of the Netherlands.

Athletes	Event	Heat		Final	
Athletes	Event	Time	Rank	Time	Rank
Ragnvaldur Jensen	100m breaststroke SB14	1:13.92	12	did not advance	

== See also ==
- Faroe Islands at the Paralympics
