= Faroe Islands at the 1992 Summer Paralympics =

- IPC code: FRO
- NPC: The Faroese Sport Organisation for Disabled

in Barcelona
- Competitors: 3 in 2 sports
- Medals: Gold 0 Silver 1 Bronze 0 Total 1

Summer Paralympics appearances (overview)
- 1984; 1988; 1992; 1996; 2000; 2004; 2008; 2012; 2016; 2020; 2024

The Faroe Islands competed at the 1992 Summer Paralympics in Barcelona, Spain. The islands' delegation consisted of three athletes competing in two sports. Durid Svensson and Tóra við Keldu represented the Faroe Islands in women's swimming, and Heini Festirstein in men's table tennis.

Við Keldu won the Faroe Islands' only medal, a silver in the S10 100 metre freestyle.

== See also ==
- Faroe Islands at the Paralympics
