= Faroe Islands at the 1984 Summer Paralympics =

- IPC code: FRO
- NPC: The Faroese Sport Organisation for Disabled

in Stoke Mandeville/New York
- Competitors: 3 in 1 sport
- Medals: Gold 0 Silver 0 Bronze 0 Total 0

Summer Paralympics appearances (overview)
- 1984; 1988; 1992; 1996; 2000; 2004; 2008; 2012; 2016; 2020; 2024

The Faroe Islands competed at the 1984 Summer Paralympics co-hosted by Stoke Mandeville, United Kingdom and New York City, United States. The Faroe Islands were competing at the Paralympic Games for the first time, and were represented by three swimmers: Katrin Johansen, Ólavur Kongsbak and Kristvør Rasmussen. The Faroese competitors did not win any medals.
