= Culture of Scandinavia =

The Culture of Scandinavia encompasses the cultures of the Scandinavia region Northern Europe including Denmark, Norway, and Sweden, and may also include the Nordic countries Finland, Iceland, and the Faroe Islands.

National cultures within Scandinavia include:

- Culture of Sweden
- Culture of Norway
- Culture of Denmark
- Culture of Iceland
- Culture of Faroe Islands
- Culture of Finland

== See also ==
- Culture of Europe
- Cultural policies of the European Union
- History of Scandinavia
