= Faroe Islands at the 1996 Summer Paralympics =

- IPC code: FRO
- NPC: The Faroese Sport Organisation for Disabled

in Atlanta
- Competitors: 1 in 1 sport
- Medals: Gold 0 Silver 0 Bronze 0 Total 0

Summer Paralympics appearances (overview)
- 1984; 1988; 1992; 1996; 2000; 2004; 2008; 2012; 2016; 2020; 2024

The Faroe Islands competed at the 1996 Summer Paralympics in Atlanta, United States. The islands' delegation consisted of a single representative, Ester Høj in swimming (S7 disability category). Høj did not win any medals.

== See also ==
- Faroe Islands at the Paralympics
