= Faroe Islands at the 2000 Summer Paralympics =

- IPC code: FRO
- NPC: The Faroese Sport Organisation for Disabled

in Sydney
- Competitors: 2 in 1 sport
- Medals Ranked 52nd: Gold 0 Silver 3 Bronze 1 Total 4

Summer Paralympics appearances (overview)
- 1984; 1988; 1992; 1996; 2000; 2004; 2008; 2012; 2016; 2020; 2024

The Faroe Islands competed at the 2000 Summer Paralympics in Sydney, Australia. The islands' delegation consisted of two swimmers, Heidi Andreasen and Esther Hansen.

Andreasen won all four of the Faroe Islands' medals at this edition of the Paralympics: three silver (S8 50m freestyle, S8 100m freestyle, S8 400m freestyle) and one bronze (S8 100m backstroke).

== Medallists ==
Medal	Name	Sport	Event
Silver	Heidi Andreasen	Swimming	Women's 50m freestyle S8
Silver	Heidi Andreasen	Swimming	Women's 100m freestyle S8
Silver	Heidi Andreasen	Swimming	Women's 400m freestyle S8
Bronze	Heidi Andreasen	Swimming	Women's 50m backstroke S8

== See also ==
- Faroe Islands at the Paralympics
