= List of museums in the Faroe Islands =

This is a list of museums in the Faroe Islands.

- Kirkjubøargarður
- Listasavn Føroya
- Maritime Museum of Vágur
- Museum Husid uttan Ánna
- Myri Museum
- National Museum of the Faroe Islands
- Porkeri Museum
- Ruth Smith Art Museum
- Tvøroyri Museum
- Vágur Museum

== See also ==
- List of museums in Denmark
- List of museums
