= Cecilie Drabsch Norland =

Norwegian Paralympic swimmer (born 1978)

Personal information
- Born: 10 November 1978 (age 47) Stavanger, Norway
- Height: 1.64 m (5 ft 5 in)

Sport
- Country: Norway
- Sport: Paralympic swimming
- Disability: Cerebral palsy
- Disability class: S8
Medal record
Paralympic swimming
Representing Norway
Paralympic Games
Gold medal – first place	2004 Athens	Women's 50m freestyle S8
Gold medal – first place	2008 Beijing	Women's 50m freestyle S8
Bronze medal – third place	2004 Athens	Women's 100m freestyle S8
World Championships (LC)
Silver medal – second place	1998 Christchurch	Women's 100m freestyle S8
Silver medal – second place	2006 Durban	Women's 50m freestyle S8
Bronze medal – third place	1998 Christchurch	Women's 50m freestyle S8
Bronze medal – third place	2006 Durban	Women's 100m freestyle S8
World Championships (SC)
Gold medal – first place	2009 Rio de Janeiro	Women's 50m freestyle S8
Bronze medal – third place	2009 Rio de Janeiro	Women's 100m freestyle S8

Cecilie Drabsch Norland (born 10 November 1978) is a retired Norwegian Paralympic swimmer who competed in international level events. She was Norway's first gold medallist in swimming and was the flag bearer for Norway at the 2008 Summer Paralympics.
