= Faroese Confederation of Sports & Olympic Committee =

The Faroese Confederation of Sports & Olympic Committee (Faroese: Ítróttasamband Føroya) (abbreviated ÍSF or FCSOC) is the highest authority for sporting activity in the Faroe Islands. It oversees 24 sports associations and over 100 sports clubs for a population of 51,312.

== History ==
The Faroese Confederation of Sports was formed in 1939 and its Olympic Committee was added in 1982. In 2019 the Faroese Confederation of Sports celebrated its 80th anniversary.

== Structure ==
The FCSOC is run by an executive board consisting of:

- Elin Heðinsdóttir Joensen - President
- Jon Hestoy - Vice President
- John Kjær - member
- Schandorff Vang - member
- Sigurd Rasmussen - member
- Petur Mittún - Secretary General

== Responsibilities ==
FCSOC is funded by the Faroese Government and Ítróttarvedding (the Faroese Lottery). Most of FCSOC's budget is used to support the Faroe Islands’ 24 sports associations with over 100 sports clubs, ranging from grassroots clubs through to elite athletes, and anti-doping measures. It also leads the Faroe Islands campaign for Olympic recognition.

== Olympic Recognition ==
The Faroe Islands has been a self-governing region of the Kingdom of Denmark since 1948.

Currently, the only option its athletes have to compete in the Olympics is as part of the Danish National Olympic Committee.

The FCSOC is leading a campaign to get Olympic recognition for the Faroe Islands – an ambition the nation has held for more than 40 years.

Arguments for Olympic recognition include the fact that the Faroe Islands is:

- A founding member of the International Paralympic Committee and competed in every Paralympic Games since 1984, winning 13 medals
- Recognised in its own right by eight International Federations and competes in major championships in archery, badminton, football, handball, judo, swimming, table tennis and volleyball

At the political level the Faroe Islands:

- Has its own Parliament, language and controls all key domestic matters including education, tax, trade and fisheries
- Has its own flag and passport and is not part of the Schengen Area, unlike Denmark
- Is recognised by international organisations such as UNESCO and the International Maritime Organisation, among others
- Has the support of the Danish National Olympic Committee as well as other Nordic NOCs for its Olympic recognition campaign

The Faroe Islands has claimed it is in an “Olympic no-man’s land” where, for a few weeks every four years, its athletes have to compete under a different flag. It has called on the IOC to reconsider granting the Faroe Islands Olympic recognition.

== Sport in the Faroe Islands ==
A third of Faroese people are registered members of sports clubs, and 86% of children actively participate in a sport.

Sport is privately funded.

== Athletes and Sporting Achievements ==
The Faroe Islands has, and continues to, produce world class athletes. These include:

Pál Joensen, three times gold medal winner at 2008 European Junior Championships in Belgrade [400m, 800m and 1500m], silver medallist in 2010 European Championships in Belgrade [1500m], bronze medallist at 2012 FINA World Swimming Championships Short Course [1500m], silver medallist at 2013 European Short Course Championships [1500m], twice silver medallist at 2014 European Championships [800m and 1500m] and 4th at 2014 FINA World Swimming Championships [1500m]. Pál Joensen competed at the London 2012 and Rio 2016 for Denmark.

Katrin Olsen, silver medallist at the Rowing World Championships 2005 and 2006 and competed at the Beijing 2008 Olympics for Denmark.

Jens Kristian Dam, 2018 World Indoor Rowing Champion

Sverri Nielsen, 2nd in the men's single sculls at the 2019 World Rowing Championships in Ottensheim, Austria where he qualified a berth for Denmark at the 2020 Summer Olympics.

Men's Football, since joining FIFA in 1988, Faroe Islands has beaten Greece and Austria, and finished above Latvia and Andorra in its 2018 FIFA World Cup qualification group

Men's U21 Handball, competed in 2017 World Junior Handball Championships, finishing 16th in the 24 team tournament

Men's U17 Handball, won the European Handball Federation 2019 Men's European Open 17 in Gothenburg, beating hosts Sweden 36–29 in the final.
