= Sarah Castle =

American Paralympic athlete and Judge (born 1984)

Personal information
- Nationality: United States
- Born: 1984 (age 41–42) Denver, Colorado
- Height: 5 ft 2 in (157 cm)
Medal record
Representing United States
Swimming
Paralympic Games
Silver medal – second place	2000 Sydney	100m breaststroke SB6
World Championships
Silver medal – second place	2002 Mar del Plata	100m breaststroke SB6
Wheelchair basketball
Paralympic Games
Gold medal – first place	2008 Beijing	Women's wheelchair basketball
World Championships
Gold medal – first place	2010 Birmingham	Women's wheelchair basketball
Silver medal – second place	2006 Amsterdam	Women's wheelchair basketball
Parapan American Games
Gold medal – first place	2007 Rio de Janeiro	Women's wheelchair basketball
Gold medal – first place	2011 Guadalajara	Women's wheelchair basketball
Various
Gold medal – first place	2005 Americas Cup	Women's wheelchair basketball
Gold medal – first place	2008 Osaka Cup	Women's wheelchair basketball

Judge Sarah Castle is an American Paralympic wheelchair basketball player and swimmer. She was on the board of the National Wheelchair Basketball Association from 2008-2020 and was its President from 2015-2019. She has been a judge since being appointed by Governor Mike Parson in 2020 after being a prosecutor since 2013.

== Biography ==
Castle was born in 1984 in Denver, Colorado. In 2002, she won a silver medal at Swimming World championships while in 2005 she won a gold one at the Americas Cup. She also got a gold medal at the Osaka Cup which was hosted at Osaka, Japan and was a two-time gold medalist at Parapan American Games in 2007 and 2011 respectively. Besides being a gold medalist in those events, she also won gold at IWBF World Championships in 2010 and was awarded another one at 2008 Summer Paralympics. Besides winning golds she also won another silver medal at IWBF World Championships in 2006 and got another silver at the 2000 Summer Paralympics for 100 metres (330 ft) breaststroke. Castle was also a four-time NCAA National Champion from 2002 to 2008 (except for 2005 and 2007 where she wasn't awarded that honour). After her involvement in the NWBA, Castle was inducted into its Hall of Fame in 2022.
