= Dóra Pásztory =

Hungarian Paralympic swimmer

Personal information
- Born: 4 April 1984 (age 42) Nagyatád, Hungary

Sport
- Country: Hungary
- Sport: Paralympic swimming
- Disability class: S8
Medal record
Paralympic swimming
Representing Hungary
Paralympic Games
Gold medal – first place	2000 Sydney	Women's 200m individual medley SM8
Gold medal – first place	2004 Athens	Women's 200m individual medley SM8
Silver medal – second place	2004 Athens	Women's 100m backstroke S8
Silver medal – second place	2004 Athens	Women's 100m butterfly S8
Bronze medal – third place	2000 Sydney	Women's 100m butterfly S8
World Championships
Gold medal – first place	2002 Mar del Plata	Women's 200m individual medley SM8
Bronze medal – third place	2002 Mar del Plata	Women's 100m butterfly S8

Dóra Pásztory (born 4 April 1984) is a retired Hungarian Paralympic swimmer who specialized in the individual medley. She was born without her left forearm and three fingers on her right hand. After her retirement from swimming, she became a journalist.
