= Chantal Boonacker =

Dutch Paralympic swimmer (1977–2021)

Personal information
- Born: 23 March 1977
- Died: 29 January 2021 (aged 43)

Sport
- Country: Netherlands
- Sport: Swimming
Medal record
Paralympic Games
Bronze medal – third place	2004 Athens	100 metre backstroke S8
Bronze medal – third place	2008 Beijing	100 metre backstroke S7

Chantal Boonacker (born 23 March 1977 - 29 January 2021) was a Dutch Paralympic swimmer. She represented the Netherlands at the Summer Paralympics in 2000, 2004 and 2008.

At the 2004 Summer Paralympics held in Athens, Greece, she won the bronze medal in the women's 100 metre backstroke S8 event and at the 2008 Summer Paralympics held in Beijing, China, she won the bronze medal in the women's 100 metre backstroke S7 event.
