= Immacolata Cerasuolo =

Italian Paralympic swimmer

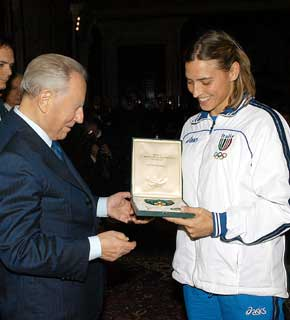
- Receiving an award from Carlo Azeglio Ciampi

Personal information
- Nationality: Italian
- Born: 18 June 1980 (age 46) Naples

Sport
- Country: Italy
- Sport: Paralympic swimming
- Disability class: S8 - SB8 - SM8
- Event(s): free style, breaststroke, butterfly swimming and mixed
- Club: Centro Ester Napoli
Medal record
Women's para swimming
Representing Italy
Event	1st	2nd	3rd
Paralympic Games	1	1	0
World Championships	0	2	0
Paralympic Games
Gold medal – first place	2004 Athens	100 m butterfly - S8
Silver medal – second place	2004 Athens	200 m medley - SM8
World Championships
Silver medal – second place	2002 Mar del Plata	100 m butterfly - S8
Silver medal – second place	2002 Mar del Plata	200 m medley - SM8

Immacolata Cerasuolo (born 18 June 1980) is a Paralympic swimmer for Italy.

== Career ==
A promising swimmer since childhood, she became an athlete with disability category S8 following a motorbike accident that left her without use of her right arm.

She has competed in two Paralympic Games (2004 Athens and 2008 Beijing), winning one gold and one silver medal. She also took part in the IPC Swimming World Championships in Mar del Plata (Argentina) in 2002 and in Durban (South Africa) in 2006, winning 2 silver medals.
