= Lichelle Clarke =

Australian Paralympic swimmer

Personal information
- Full name: Lichelle Jade Clarke
- Nationality: Australian
- Born: 26 February 1986 (age 40) Mount Waverley, Victoria
Medal record
Swimming
Representing Australia
Paralympic Games
Silver medal – second place	2004 Athens	Women's 400 m Freestyle S8
Bronze medal – third place	2004 Athens	Women's 4x100 m Freestyle 34 pts

Lichelle Jade Clarke (born 26 February 1986) is an Australian Paralympic swimmer. She was born in Mount Waverley, Victoria. At the 2004 Athens Games, she won a silver medal in the Women's 400 m Freestyle S8 event and a bronze medal in the Women's 4x100 m Freestyle 34 pts event with her teammates.

At the 2006 Commonwealth Games in Melbourne, she finished 7th in the Women's 100m Freestyle EAD final. She was an Australian Institute of Sport paralympic swimming scholarship holder from 2003 to 2006. She swam for the Warragul Water Warriors and was a member of the Gippsland Sports Academy.
