= Keren Leibovitch =

Israeli Paralympic swimmer (born 1973)

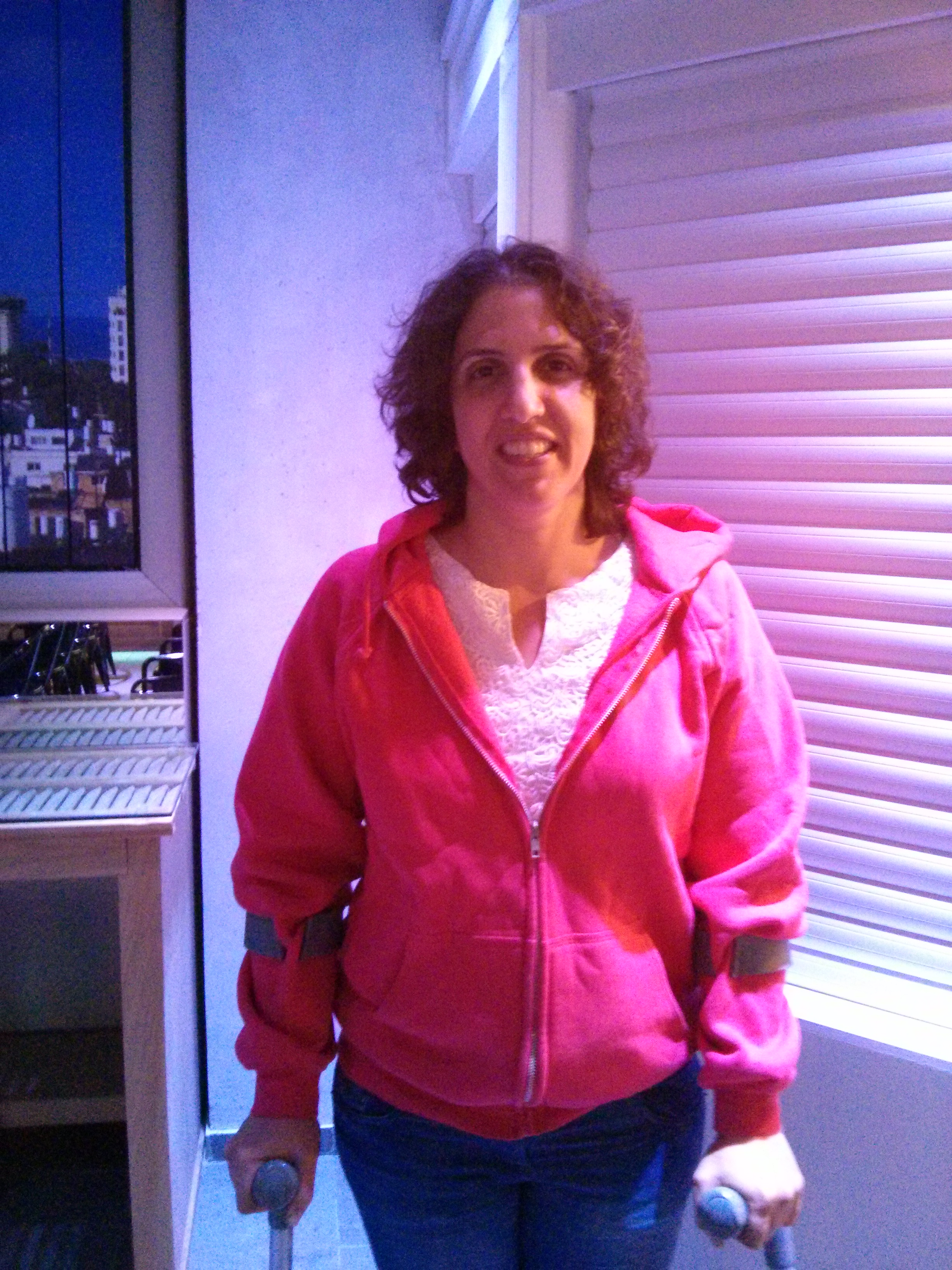

Personal information
- Native name: קרן לייבוביץ
- Full name: Keren Or Leibovitch
- Nationality: Israel
- Born: July 25, 1973 (age 53) Hod HaSharon, Israel

Sport
- Sport: Swimming
- Strokes: backstroke, freestyle
Medal record
Event / 1st / 2nd / 3rd; Paralympic Games / 4 / 2 / 1
swimming
Representing Israel
Paralympic Games
Gold medal – first place	2000 Sydney	100m backstroke S8
Gold medal – first place	2000 Sydney	100m freestyle S8
Gold medal – first place	2000 Sydney	50m freestyle S8
Gold medal – first place	2004 Athens	100m backstroke S8
Silver medal – second place	2004 Athens	100m freestyle S8
Silver medal – second place	2004 Athens	50m freestyle S8
Bronze medal – third place	2004 Athens	200m individual medley SM8

Keren Or Leibovitch (Hebrew: קרן לייבוביץ) (also Keren Or Leybovitch; born July 25, 1973) is an Israeli Paralympic swimmer.

Leibovitch is a three-time world champion, a five-time European champion, a holder of three world records (for the 100-meter and 200-meter backstroke and the 100-meter freestyle), and a seven-time Paralympic medal winner.

== Early life and injury ==
Leibovitch, who is Jewish, was born in Hod HaSharon in Israel. She first swam at the age of two. She studied philosophy at Tel Aviv University.

Her back was badly injured and she was disabled at the age of 18, in 1992, from an accident during her service in the Israel Defense Forces, while training to be an officer. Leibovitch is paralyzed from the waist down. After two major operations, she still had permanent back and leg injuries. She began swimming as part of her rehabilitation.

== Swimming career ==
She won three gold medals at the European Championships in Germany in 1999.

Leibovitch won three gold medals in swimming at the 2000 Paralympic Games in Sydney, Australia, winning the 100-meter backstroke, 100-meter freestyle, and 50-meter freestyle events. She broke three world records along the way. Asked whom she views as her hero, she responded:

I look up to people who achieve what they set their minds to. I admire people who live at peace with themselves ... who are not afraid of what society might say ... who think to make themselves really happy. If people can relate to a disabled person as a winner, then the whole attitude towards disabled persons might change. And if I achieve that, that's my fourth medal.

She was given the honor of lighting the ceremonial flame to open the 2001 Maccabiah Games at Teddy Stadium in Jerusalem.

She set a world record in 2002 in the 100-meter women’s freestyle, with a time of 1:08.90. She won three gold medals in the Israeli Swimming Championships for the Handicapped in 2003, and, set a world record for the 50-meter backstroke (37.78 seconds), also earning gold medals in the 50-meter and 100-meter freestyle events.

She set a world record for handicapped swimmers in the 200-meter backstroke of 258.55 in June 2004 at the Wingate Institute. By 2004, she was also the world record holder in the 100-meter freestyle.

In September 2004 she won a gold medal in the women's 100-meter backstroke (1:19.55) at the 2004 Paralympic Games in Athens. She also won two silver medals (swimming a 1.09.86 in the 100-meter freestyle, 19 seconds behind Paralympic-record-setting American Jessica Long, who broke her own Paralympic record, and the 50-meter freestyle) and a bronze medal (in the 200-meter individual medley). The world record holder in the event, she finished in 1:19.55, nearly five seconds faster than second place Dóra Pásztory of Hungary. The Games hosted competing athletes from 136 countries.

In 2005, she was voted the 46th-greatest Israeli of all time, in a poll by the Israeli news website Ynet to determine whom the general public considered the 200 Greatest Israelis.

At the 2008 Paralympic Games in Beijing, a year after giving birth to her first child, she narrowly missed winning her eighth Paralympic medal, coming in fourth in the 100-meter backstroke.

== See also ==
- List of select Jewish swimmers
