= Amanda Everlove =

American Paralympic swimmer

Personal information
- Nationality: United States
- Born: March 26, 1990 (age 36) Valencia, California, U.S.
- Height: 5 ft 4 in (163 cm)
- Weight: 135 lb (61 kg)

Sport
- Sport: Swimming
- Disability class: S8
- Strokes: Backstroke, breaststroke, butterfly, freestyle, medley
- Coach: Jimi Flowers (2008); Peggy Ewald (2011)
Medal record
Paralympic Games
Silver medal – second place	2008 Beijing	50m freestyle S8
Silver medal – second place	2008 Beijing	100m butterfly S8
Silver medal – second place	2008 Beijing	200m individual medley SM8
Parapan American Games
Gold medal – first place	2011 Guadalajara	100m butterfly S8
Silver medal – second place	2007 Rio de Janeiro	50m freestyle S8
Silver medal – second place	2007 Rio de Janeiro	100m backstroke S8
Silver medal – second place	2007 Rio de Janeiro	200m individual medley SM8
Silver medal – second place	2011 Guadalajara	100m breaststroke S8
IPC World Championships
Bronze medal – third place	2010 Eindhoven	200 metre individual medley S8

Amanda Everlove (born March 26, 1990) is an American Paralympic swimmer.

== Early life and career ==
Everlove was born in Valencia, California, but upon finishing her freshman year of St. Mary’s High School in July 2005, she and her family moved to Wichita, Kansas. There, she qualified for the meeting with the International Paralympics Team at Portland, Oregon where she swam 100-meter butterfly.

In 2007, she won gold for 50 metre freestyle and 2 silvers for 200 metre individual medley and 100 metre backstroke respectively at Parapan American Games. In 2010 she won bronze at World Championships for another 200 metre individual medley. In 2011, at another Parapan American Games she won a gold one for 100 metre fly and the same year got silver again, this time for 100 metre breaststroke.

In summer 2008, with her parents' permission she left Kansas and settled in Colorado Springs, Colorado to attend training at the United States Olympic Training Center. As a result, she participated at Paralympic swimming event at the 2008 Summer Paralympic Games in Beijing, China where she won silver medals in the 100m butterfly, 50m freestyle and 200m individual medley.

After the Paralympics she moved to Indiana where she decided to study chemical engineering at the St. Mary’s College. Upon completing a semester there, she decided to pursue a degree in pharmacy at the Ohio Northern University instead, where, in 2011, she met Peggy Ewald, her new coach. In 2012, she returned to Colorado Springs and began attending University of Colorado.
