= Faroe Islands at the 2004 Summer Paralympics =

- IPC code: FRO
- NPC: The Faroese Sport Organisation for Disabled

in Athens
- Competitors: 1 in 1 sport
- Flag bearer: Heidi Andreasen
- Medals Ranked 73rd: Gold 0 Silver 0 Bronze 1 Total 1

Summer Paralympics appearances (overview)
- 1984; 1988; 1992; 1996; 2000; 2004; 2008; 2012; 2016; 2020; 2024

The Faroe Islands competed at the 2004 Summer Paralympics in Athens, Greece. The islands' delegation consisted of a single athlete, Heidi Andreasen in swimming.

== Medallists ==
Medal	Name	Sport	Event
Bronze	Heidi Andreasen	Swimming	Women's 400m freestyle S8

== Sports ==
=== Swimming ===
Athlete	Class	Event	Heats		Final	
Athlete	Class	Event	Result	Rank	Result	Rank
Heidi Andreasen	S8	50m freestyle	33.27	4 Q	33.31	4
Heidi Andreasen	S8	100m freestyle	1:12.38	3 Q	1:12.74	5
Heidi Andreasen	S8	400m freestyle	5:28.27	2 Q	5:26.29	3rd place, bronze medalist(s)
Heidi Andreasen	S8	100m butterfly	1:31.11	9	did not advance	

== See also ==
- Faroe Islands at the Paralympics
