= Mariann Marthinsen =

Norwegian cross-country skier and swimmer

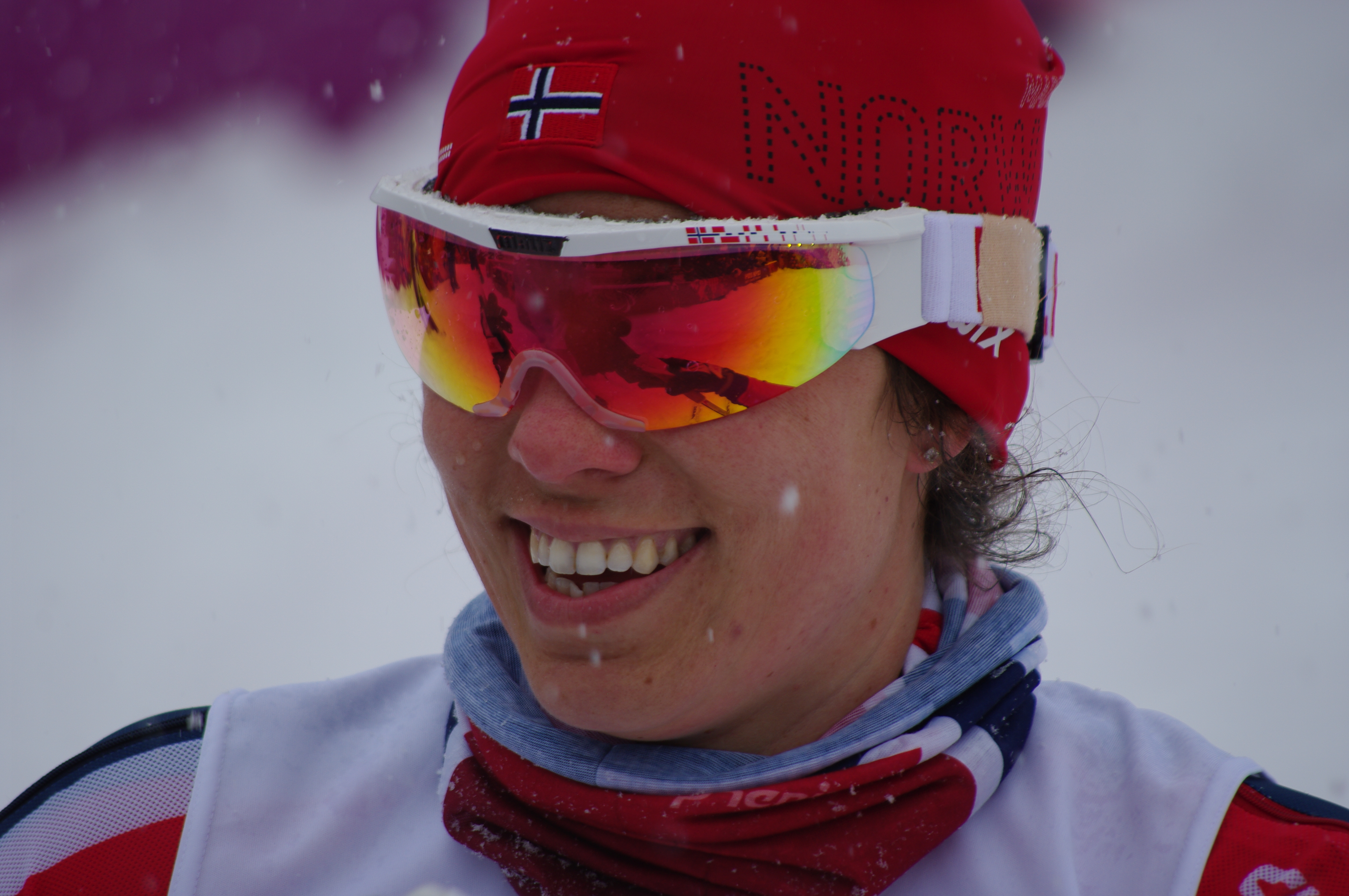
- Mariann Marthinsen at the 2014 Winter Paralympics

Personal information
- National team: Norway
- Born: Mariann Vestbostad; September 9, 1984 (age 41)
- Education: Western Norway University of Applied Sciences
- Occupation: Social worker
- Spouse: Hermund Marthinsen

Sport
- Country: Norway
- Sport: Cross-country skiing, swimming
- Disability: Right leg amputation
- Disability class: S8
- Club: Vestkanttorvet swimmers
- Coached by: Torbjørn Brox Pettersen
- Retired: 2015
Medal record
Representing Norway
Women's cross-country skiing
Paralympic Games
Gold medal – first place	2014 Sochi	1km sprint classic, sitting
Women's swimming
Paralympic Games
Bronze medal – third place	2008 Beijing	100 metre backstroke S8
- Updated on 15 November 2017

Mariann Marthinsen (born 9 September 1984) is a Norwegian cross-country skier and swimmer. She won a bronze medal at the 2008 Summer Paralympics, and won Norway's only gold medal at 2014 Winter Paralympics.

== Career ==
Mariann Marthinsen (née Vestbostad) was born on 9 September 1984. Her right leg was amputated when she was two, following a road traffic accident. She attended Western Norway University of Applied Sciences, where she studied Social Work Studies, later going on to become a social worker. In 2003, she began competing in swimming. During the course of her swimming career, she set 17 world records and won a bronze medal at the 2008 Summer Paralympics in Beijing, China, in the women's 100 metre backstroke S8, and also competed in freestyle races.

Also in 2008, she decided to take up cross-country skiing, going on to win the seated skiing World Cup in 2013/14. At the 2014 Winter Paralympics in Sochi, Russia, she won Norway's first gold medal at a Winter Paralympics with a victory in the women's 1km sprint classic, sitting. Marthinsen had led in the prologue round, and then in her heat but entered the final as the third fastest. She entered the last corner in fourth place, but took the lead with a few metres to go. In the 5 km race, one of her skis were damaged early in the race, resulting in Marthinsen finishing in 15th place.
