= Andrea Cole =

Canadian Paralympic swimmer

Personal information
- Born: 29 January 1984 (age 42) Thunder Bay, Ontario, Canada
- Education: University of Western Ontario; Lakehead University; Queen's University

Sport
- Sport: Paralympic swimming
- Disability class: S8
Medal record
Representing Canada
Paralympic Games
Gold medal – first place	2000 Sydney	4x100m freestyle relay 34pts
Silver medal – second place	2000 Sydney	100m butterfly S8
Silver medal – second place	2004 Athens	4x100m freestyle relay 34pts
Bronze medal – third place	2004 Athens	100m butterfly S8
World Championships
Bronze medal – third place	2002 Mar del Plata	200m individual medley SM8
Bronze medal – third place	2006 Durban	400m freestyle S8
Parapan American Games
Gold medal – first place	2007 Rio de Janeiro	100m freestyle S8
Gold medal – first place	2007 Rio de Janeiro	400m freestyle S8
Gold medal – first place	2007 Rio de Janeiro	100m backstroke S8
Gold medal – first place	2007 Rio de Janeiro	200m individual medley SM8
Gold medal – first place	2007 Rio de Janeiro	4x100m medley relay 34pts
Silver medal – second place	2007 Rio de Janeiro	50m freestyle S8

Andrea Cole (born 29 January 1984) is a Canadian former Paralympic swimmer. She competed as a member of Team Canada at the 2000 Summer Paralympics, 2004 Summer Paralympics, and 2008 Summer Paralympics. She set a Canadian record in the women's SM8 200-m individual medley in 2002 with a time of 3:03.04, which was beaten in 2016.

== Early life ==
Cole was born and raised in Thunder Bay, Ontario. She began swimming after her mother read an article about a Paralympic swimmer.

== Career ==
Cole was selected to compete with Team Canada's National Swimming Team during the 2000 Summer Paralympics. In 2002, Cole set a new Canadian women's record for fastest SM8 200-m individual medley with a time of 3:03.04. This record was later beaten in 2016 by Abi Tripp. Cole was named to Team Canada's National Swimming Team for the 2004 Summer Paralympics where she won a silver medal in the 4X100m freestyle relay and bronze in the 100m butterfly. As a result, she was named a co-recipient of the 2005 Janet Dunn Award from the Canadian Cerebral Palsy Sport Association.

In 2007, Cole qualified for the Parapan American Games with a time of one minute, 26.32 seconds in the 100-metre butterfly. During the 2007 Parapan American Games, she won two gold medals while competing in the women's S8 disability category 100-freestyle and 100 backstroke. The next year, she was selected to compete at the 2008 Summer Paralympics in the S8 200m IM.

In 2013, Cole was inducted into the Northwestern Ontario Sports Hall of Fame.
