= Heidi Andreasen =

Faroese swimmer (born 1985)

Personal information
- Born: December 18, 1985 (age 40) Tórshavn, Faroe Islands

Sport
- Sport: Swimming
Medal record
Representing Faroe Islands
Swimming (S8)
Paralympic Games
Silver medal – second place	2000 Sydney	50m freestyle
Silver medal – second place	2000 Sydney	100m freestyle
Silver medal – second place	2000 Sydney	400m freestyle
Bronze medal – third place	2000 Sydney	100m backstroke
Bronze medal – third place	2004 Athens	400m freestyle

Heidi Andreasen (born 18 December 1985) is a Faroese swimmer.

She represented the Faroe Islands at the 2000 Summer Paralympics, winning three silver medals, in the S8 50m freestyle, the S8 100m freestyle, and the S8 400m freestyle, and a bronze in the S8 100m backstroke.

She was the Faroe Islands' sole representative at the 2004 Summer Paralympics, where she won the Islands' only medal: a bronze in the S8 400m freestyle, with a time of 5:26,29.

Andreasen was again her nation's only competitor at the 2008 Summer Paralympics, and the Faroe Islands' flagbearer during the Games' opening ceremony. She did not win a medal. It was her last participation in the Paralympic Games.

There were no Olympic-sized pools in the Faroe Islands, where Andreasen trained in a 25-metre pool.
