= Spain at the 2004 Summer Paralympics =

- IPC code: ESP
- NPC: Spanish Paralympic Committee
- Website: www.paralimpicos.es (in Spanish)

in Athens
- Competitors: 158 in 12 sports
- Medals Ranked 7th: Gold 20 Silver 27 Bronze 24 Total 71

Summer Paralympics appearances (overview)
- 1968; 1972; 1976; 1980; 1984; 1988; 1992; 1996; 2000; 2004; 2008; 2012; 2016; 2020; 2024

Spain competed at the 2004 Summer Paralympics in Athens, Greece. The team included 158 athletes—123 men and 35 women. Spanish competitors won 71 medals, 20 gold, 27 silver and 24 bronze, to finish 7th in the medal table.

== Medallists ==
Medal	Name	Sport	Event
Gold	Abel Avila	Athletics	Men's 800m T12
Gold	David Casinos	Athletics	Men's shot put F11
Gold	José Javier Curto	Boccia	Mixed individual BC2
Gold	Javier Otxoa	Cycling	Men's bicycle road race/time trial CP3
Gold	Antonio Garcia	Cycling	Men's bicycle road race/time trial LC3
Gold	Roberto Alcaide	Cycling	Men's bicycle 4 km individual pursuit LC2
Gold	Carmen Herrera	Judo	Women's 70 kg
Gold	Sebastián Rodríguez	Swimming	Men's 50m freestyle S5
Gold	Sebastián Rodríguez	Swimming	Men's 100m freestyle S5
Gold	Sebastián Rodríguez	Swimming	Men's 200m freestyle S5
Gold	Jesus Collado	Swimming	Men's 100m butterfly S9
Gold	Miguel Luque	Swimming	Men's 50m breaststroke SB3
Gold	Sara Carracelas	Swimming	Women's 50m freestyle S2
Gold	Sara Carracelas	Swimming	Women's 100m freestyle S2
Gold	Teresa Perales	Swimming	Women's 100m freestyle S5
Gold	Anais Garcia	Swimming	Women's 100m freestyle S11
Gold	Ana Garcia-Arcicollar	Swimming	Women's 400m freestyle S12
Gold	Teresa Perales	Swimming	Women's 50m butterfly S5
Gold	Sandra Gómez Pérez	Swimming	Women's 100m breaststroke SB12
Gold	Sara Carracelas	Swimming	Women's 50m backstroke S2
Silver	Luis Bullido	Athletics	Men's 200m T11
Silver	Luis Bullido	Athletics	Men's 400m T11
Silver	José Pampano	Athletics	Men's 1500m T36
Silver	Santiago Sanz	Athletics	Men's 1500m T52
Silver	Javier Conde	Athletics	Men's 500m T46
Silver	Rosalia Lazaro	Athletics	Women's long jump F12
Silver	Santiago Pesquera	Boccia	Mixed individual BC3
Silver	Santiago Pesquera; José Manuel Rodríguez	Boccia	Mixed pairs BC3
Silver	Roberto Alcaide	Cycling	Men's bicycle road race/time trial LC2
Silver	David Llaurado; Christian Venge	Cycling	Men's tandem road race/time trial B1-3
Silver	Javier Otxoa	Cycling	Men's bicycle 3 km individual pursuit CP3
Silver	Juanjo Mendez	Cycling	Men's bicycle 3 km individual pursuit LC4
Silver	David Garcia del Valle	Judo	Men's 66 kg
Silver	Marta Arce Payno	Judo	Women's 57 kg
Silver	Maria Olmedo	Judo	Women's +70 kg
Silver	Daniel Vidal	Swimming	Men's 50m freestyle S6
Silver	David Levecq	Swimming	Men's 50m freestyle S10
Silver	David Levecq	Swimming	Men's 100m freestyle S10
Silver	Richard Oribe	Swimming	Men's 200m freestyle S4
Silver	Enrique Floriano	Swimming	Men's 400m freestyle S12
Silver	Vicente Gil	Swimming	Men's 50m breaststroke SB3
Silver	Javier Goni	Swimming	Men's 100m backstroke S11
Silver	Xavier Torres	Swimming	Men's 150m individual medley SM4
Silver	Albert Gelis; Daniel Llambrich; Israel Oliver; Enrique Floriano	Swimming	Men's 4 × 100 m medley relay 49pts
Silver	Deborah Font	Swimming	Women's 400m freestyle S12
Silver	Deborah Font	Swimming	Women's 100m breaststroke SB12
Silver	Regina Cachan; Noelia Garcia; Teresa Perales; Vanesa Capo	Swimming	Women's 4 × 100 m medley relay 34pts
Bronze	Luis Bullido	Athletics	Men's 100m T11
Bronze	Santiago Sanz	Athletics	Men's 5000m T52
Bronze	Purificacion Santamarta	Athletics	Women's 200m T11
Bronze	Jose Maria Dueso	Boccia	Mixed individual BC4
Bronze	Francisco Javier Beltran; Antonio Cid Cortes; Pedro Cordero; José Javier Curto	Boccia	Mixed team BC1/BC2
Bronze	Antonio Martin; Vicente Aguilar; Marcelo Rosado; Gonzalo Largo; Alfredo Cuadrado; Jose Lopez Ramirez; Adolfo Acosta; Carmelo Garrido; Pedro Antonio Garcia Villa; Carlos Alvarez	Football 5-a-side	Men's team
Bronze	Raúl Fernández	Judo	Men's 90 kg
Bronze	Monica Merenciano	Judo	Women's 63 kg
Bronze	Richard Oribe	Swimming	Men's 100m freestyle S4
Bronze	Enhamed Mohamed	Swimming	Men's 400m freestyle S11
Bronze	Daniel Vidal	Swimming	Men's 50m butterfly S6
Bronze	Enhamed Mohamed	Swimming	Men's 100m butterfly S11
Bronze	Israel Oliver	Swimming	Men's 100m butterfly S12
Bronze	Jesus Collado	Swimming	Men's 100m backstroke S9
Bronze	Enrique Floriano	Swimming	Men's 200m individual medley SM12
Bronze	Xavier Torres; Pablo Cimadevila; Daniel Vidal; Sebastián Rodríguez	Swimming	Men's 4 x 50m medley relay 20 pts
Bronze	Teresa Perales	Swimming	Women's 50m freestyle S5
Bronze	Esther Morales Fernández	Swimming	Women's 50m freestyle S10
Bronze	Ana Garcia-Arcicollar	Swimming	Women's 100m butterfly S12
Bronze	Teresa Perales	Swimming	Women's 100m breaststroke SB4
Bronze	Teresa Perales	Swimming	Women's 50m backstroke S5
Bronze	Esther Morales Fernández	Swimming	Women's 100m backstroke S10
Bronze	Deborah Font	Swimming	Women's 200m individual medley SM12
Bronze	Jordi Morales	Table tennis	Men's singles class 7

== Sports ==
=== Archery ===
Athlete	Event	Ranking round		Round of 32	Round of 16	Quarterfinals	Semifinals	Finals	
Athlete	Event	Score	Seed	Opposition score	Opposition score	Opposition score	Opposition score	Opposition score	Rank
Juan Miguel Zarzuela	Men's individual standing	590	12	Hawthorne (GBR); W 151-136	Kwan (KOR); W 144-142	Lezanski (POL); L 89-95	did not advance		
Manuel Candela	Men's individual W2	597	13	Dror (ISR); W 144-141	Hui (TPE); L 150-152	did not advance			
Jose Manuel Marin	Men's individual W2	596	14	Buchanan (GBR); W 140-131	Oehme (GER); L 139-150	did not advance			
Manuel Candela; Jose Manuel Marin; Juan Miguel Zarzuela	Men's team	1783	9	N/A	Slovakia (SVK); L 209-209 ≠	did not advance			

≠ The men's team event round against Slovakia was decided by additional arrows. The Slovak team won 26-18 and were through to the quarterfinals against South Korea.

=== Athletics ===
==== Men's track ====
Athlete	Class	Event	Heats		Semifinal		Final	
Athlete	Class	Event	Result	Rank	Result	Rank	Result	Rank
Abel Avila	T12	800m	1:59.52	5 q	N/A		1:59.00	5
Abel Avila	T12	1500m	4:03.74	6 Q	N/A		3:57.44	5
Abel Avila	T12	5000m	N/A				15:16.70	5
Ignacio Avila	T12	400m	53.97	10	did not advance			
Ignacio Avila	T12	800m	1:58.55	3 Q	N/A		1:53.12 WR	1st place, gold medalist(s)
Ignacio Avila	T12	1500m	4:03.59	3 Q	N/A		4:04.71	6
Vicente Arzo	T54	100m	16.48	27	did not advance			
Vicente Arzo	T54	Marathon	N/A				2:00:50	27
Luís Bullido	T11	100m	11.81	5 Q	11.77	3 Q	11.75	3rd place, bronze medalist(s)
Luís Bullido	T11	200m	24.16	8 Q	23.81	2 Q	23.26	2nd place, silver medalist(s)
Luís Bullido	T11	400m	54.00	4 Q	52.87	2 Q	52.10	2nd place, silver medalist(s)
Juan Ramon Carrapiso	T38	100m	12.63	8 q	N/A		12.36	8
Juan Ramon Carrapiso	T38	200m	25.45	9	did not advance			
Juan Ramon Carrapiso	T38	400m	59.18	10	did not advance			
Jose Castilla	T46	5000m	N/A				15:52.02	12
Javier Conde	T46	5000m	N/A				15:00.31	2nd place, silver medalist(s)
Pedro Delgado	T11	400m	54.02	5 Q	55.35	5	54.54	6
Pedro Delgado	T11	1500m	N/A				4:15.57	4
Carlos Fernandez	T37	800m	2:24.90	10	did not advance			
Carlos Fernandez	T37	1500m	N/A				4:55.41	9
Jose Manuel Gonzalez	T38	400m	59.35	11	did not advance			
Jose Manuel Gonzalez	T38	800m	N/A				2:21.14	8
Iván Hompanera	T38	800m	N/A				2:13.30	5
Juan Antonio Nogales	T12	100m	11.67	17	did not advance			
Juan Antonio Nogales	T12	200m	23.65	17	did not advance			
Jose M. Pampano	T36	1500m	N/A				4:39.80	2nd place, silver medalist(s)
Ramon Pla	T52	1500m	4:40.48	13	did not advance			
Ramon Pla	T52	Marathon	N/A				2:58:44	7
Angelo Perez Galan	T36	1500m	N/A				5:19.00	7
Xavi Porras	T11	100m	12.20	17	did not advance			
Xavi Porras	T11	200m	24.61	15	did not advance			
Roger Puigbo	T53	800m	1:41.39	6 Q	N/A		1:39.46	5
Roger Puigbo	T53	Marathon	N/A				1:43:50	21
Francisco Jose Sanchez	T12	100m	11.28	5 Q	11.37	10	did not advance	
Francisco Jose Sanchez	T12	200m	23.36	10 Q	23.26	9	did not advance	
Santiago Sanz	T52	800m	2:08.04	5 Q	N/A		2:02.06	4
Santiago Sanz	T52	1500m	3:53.73 PR	1 Q	N/A		3:49.25	2nd place, silver medalist(s)
Santiago Sanz	T52	5000m	N/A				13:12.65	3rd place, bronze medalist(s)
Juan Serrano	T35	100m	15.34	8 q	N/A		15.33	8
Juan Serrano	T35	200m	N/A				31.94	5
Juan Antonio Nogales; Luís Bullido; Francisco Jose Sanchez; Javier Martin	T11-13	4 × 100 m relay	DSQ		did not advance			
Juan Ramon Carrapiso; Jose M. Pampano; Iván Hompanera; Jose Manuel Gonzalez	T35-38	4 × 400 m relay	N/A				3:59.71	4

==== Men's field ====
Athlete	Class	Event	Final	
Athlete	Class	Event	Result	Rank
David Casinos	F11	Shot put	14.01	1st place, gold medalist(s)
David Casinos	F12	Discus	38.81	7
Íñigo García	F12	Discus	34.58	9
Íñigo García	F13	Shot put	14.96	6
Javier Martin	F12	Long jump	6.36	14
Jesus Mendez	F54	Shot put	8.26	6
Daniel Moreno	F12	Long jump	6.34	16
Carlos Munoz	F36	Shot put	9.55	7
José Manuel Rodríguez	F11	Long jump	5.62	11
José Manuel Rodríguez	F11	Triple jump	12.22	6
Xavi Porras	F11	Long jump	5.79	9
Juan Viedma	F12	Long jump	6.55	9
Juan Viedma	F12	Triple jump	13.90	6

==== Women's track ====
Athlete	Class	Event	Heats		Semifinal		Final	
Athlete	Class	Event	Result	Rank	Result	Rank	Result	Rank
Sandra Barrero	T12	400m	1:02.14	7 q	1:02.63	7	DNS	
Sandra Barrero	T12	800m	2:23.91	6	did not advance			
Elena Congost	T12	100m	13.45	8 Q	13.39	7	13.43	7
Elena Congost	T12	200m	28.20	7 q	28.19	7	28.50	7
Eva Ngui	T12	100m	13.17	6 Q	DNS		did not advance	
Maria Martinez	T12	200m	28.47	10	did not advance			
Sara Martinez	T12	100m	13.85	11 q	13.85	10	did not advance	
Purificacion Santamarta	T11	100m	13.54	5 Q	13.29	3 Q	13.49	4
Purificacion Santamarta	T11	200m	27.62	3 Q	27.32	3 q	26.71	3rd place, bronze medalist(s)
Purificacion Santamarta	T11	400m	1:06.09	10	did not advance			

==== Women's field ====
Athlete	Class	Event	Final	
Athlete	Class	Event	Result	Rank
Jessica Castellano	F12	Shot put	10.51	6
Jessica Castellano	F13	Discus	30.35	8
Rosalia Lazaro	F12	Long jump	5.63	2nd place, silver medalist(s)
Maria Martinez	F12	Long jump	4.67	10
Sara Martinez	F12	Long jump	4.93	7

=== Boccia ===
==== Individual events ====
Athlete	Event	Preliminaries			Round of 16	Quarterfinals	Semifinals	Final	
Athlete	Event	Opponent	Opposition Score	Rank	Opposition Score	Opposition Score	Opposition Score	Opposition Score	Rank
Francisco Beltran	Mixed individual BC1	Taksee (THA)	W 6-4	1 Q	N/A	Aandalen (NOR); L 2-3	did not advance		
Francisco Beltran	Mixed individual BC1	Shelly (IRL)	W 9-3	1 Q	N/A	Aandalen (NOR); L 2-3	did not advance		
Francisco Beltran	Mixed individual BC1	Pearse (GBR)	W 5-3	1 Q	N/A	Aandalen (NOR); L 2-3	did not advance		
Francisco Beltran	Mixed individual BC1	Villano (ARG)	W 9-3	1 Q	N/A	Aandalen (NOR); L 2-3	did not advance		
Francisco Beltran	Mixed individual BC1	Gahleitner (AUT)	W 5-4	1 Q	N/A	Aandalen (NOR); L 2-3	did not advance		
Antonio Cid	Mixed individual BC1	Sanders (NZL)	DNF	6	N/A	did not advance			
Antonio Cid	Mixed individual BC1	Fernandez (POR)	L 2-7	6	N/A	did not advance			
Antonio Cid	Mixed individual BC1	Prossegger (AUT)	DNS	6	N/A	did not advance			
Antonio Cid	Mixed individual BC1	Robinson (GBR)	L 0-6	6	N/A	did not advance			
Antonio Cid	Mixed individual BC1	Vanhoek (CAN)	DNS	6	N/A	did not advance			
Pedro Cordero	Mixed individual BC2	Toon (NZL)	L 3-5	2 Q	Cortez (ARG); W 4-0	Murray (GBR); W 6-1	Silva (POR); L 1-10	Ferreira (POR); L 1-8	4
Pedro Cordero	Mixed individual BC2	Lorenzen (DEN)	W 14-1	2 Q	Cortez (ARG); W 4-0	Murray (GBR); W 6-1	Silva (POR); L 1-10	Ferreira (POR); L 1-8	4
Pedro Cordero	Mixed individual BC2	Hong (HKG)	W 5-2	2 Q	Cortez (ARG); W 4-0	Murray (GBR); W 6-1	Silva (POR); L 1-10	Ferreira (POR); L 1-8	4
Jose Jarvier Curto	Mixed individual BC2	Cortez (ARG)	W 6-1	1 Q	McLeod (CAN); W 7-3	Flood (NZL); W 5-2	Ferreira (POR); W 5-3	Silva (POR); W 7-3	1st place, gold medalist(s)
Jose Jarvier Curto	Mixed individual BC2	John (HKG)	W 9-3	1 Q	McLeod (CAN); W 7-3	Flood (NZL); W 5-2	Ferreira (POR); W 5-3	Silva (POR); W 7-3	1st place, gold medalist(s)
Jose Jarvier Curto	Mixed individual BC2	Bourbonniere (CAN)	W 4-1	1 Q	McLeod (CAN); W 7-3	Flood (NZL); W 5-2	Ferreira (POR); W 5-3	Silva (POR); W 7-3	1st place, gold medalist(s)
Jose Maria Dueso	Mixed individual BC4	de Oliveria Pereira (POR)	L 3-5	1 Q	N/A		Wing (HKG); L 2-3	Streharsky (SVK); W 6-2	3rd place, bronze medalist(s)
Jose Maria Dueso	Mixed individual BC4	Mourtos (GRE)	W 10-1	1 Q	N/A		Wing (HKG); L 2-3	Streharsky (SVK); W 6-2	3rd place, bronze medalist(s)
Jose Maria Dueso	Mixed individual BC4	Vandervies (CAN)	W 6-1	1 Q	N/A		Wing (HKG); L 2-3	Streharsky (SVK); W 6-2	3rd place, bronze medalist(s)
Jose Maria Dueso	Mixed individual BC4	Ledesma (ARG)	W 5-1	1 Q	N/A		Wing (HKG); L 2-3	Streharsky (SVK); W 6-2	3rd place, bronze medalist(s)
Jose Vicente Gomez	Mixed individual BC4	Valentim (POR)	L 0-9	3	did not advance				
Jose Vicente Gomez	Mixed individual BC4	Beres (HUN)	L 2-6	3	did not advance				
Jose Vicente Gomez	Mixed individual BC4	Gyurkota (HUN)	W 9-4	3	did not advance				
Jose Vicente Gomez	Mixed individual BC4	Chatzipanagiotidou (GRE)	W 5-2	3	did not advance				
Yolanda Martin	Mixed individual BC3	Costa (POR)	L 2-5	4	did not advance				
Yolanda Martin	Mixed individual BC3	Hoon (KOR)	W 4-2	4	did not advance				
Yolanda Martin	Mixed individual BC3	Dijkstra (NZL)	L 1-7	4	did not advance				
Yolanda Martin	Mixed individual BC3	Williams (USA)	L 3-4	4	did not advance				
Santiago Pesquera	Mixed individual BC3	Kabush (CAN)	W 3-2	1 Q	N/A	Rodriguez (ESP); W 5-0	Costa (POR); W 4-2	Gauthier (CAN); L 1-7	2nd place, silver medalist(s)
Santiago Pesquera	Mixed individual BC3	Krenek (CZE)	W 6-0	1 Q	N/A	Rodriguez (ESP); W 5-0	Costa (POR); W 4-2	Gauthier (CAN); L 1-7	2nd place, silver medalist(s)
Santiago Pesquera	Mixed individual BC3	O'Grady (IRL)	W 8-1	1 Q	N/A	Rodriguez (ESP); W 5-0	Costa (POR); W 4-2	Gauthier (CAN); L 1-7	2nd place, silver medalist(s)
José Manuel Rodríguez	Mixed individual BC3	Gauthier (CAN)	W 5-3	2 Q	N/A	Pesquera (ESP); L 0-5	did not advance		
José Manuel Rodríguez	Mixed individual BC3	Jackson (NZL)	W 4-3	2 Q	N/A	Pesquera (ESP); L 0-5	did not advance		
José Manuel Rodríguez	Mixed individual BC3	Hyeon (KOR)	L 4-8	2 Q	N/A	Pesquera (ESP); L 0-5	did not advance		

==== Pairs and teams events ====
Athlete	Event	Preliminaries			Semifinals	Final	
Athlete	Event	Opponent	Opposition Score	Rank	Opposition Score	Opposition Score	Rank
Francisco Beltran; Antonio Cid; Pedro Cordero; Jose Jarvier Curto	Mixed team BC1-2	Great Britain (GBR)	W 13-1	1 Q	New Zealand (NZL); L 4-6	Great Britain (GBR); W 7-5	3rd place, bronze medalist(s)
Francisco Beltran; Antonio Cid; Pedro Cordero; Jose Jarvier Curto	Mixed team BC1-2	Austria (AUT)	W 5-4	1 Q	New Zealand (NZL); L 4-6	Great Britain (GBR); W 7-5	3rd place, bronze medalist(s)
Francisco Beltran; Antonio Cid; Pedro Cordero; Jose Jarvier Curto	Mixed team BC1-2	Argentina (ARG)	L 7-8	1 Q	New Zealand (NZL); L 4-6	Great Britain (GBR); W 7-5	3rd place, bronze medalist(s)
Francisco Beltran; Antonio Cid; Pedro Cordero; Jose Jarvier Curto	Mixed team BC1-2	Canada (CAN)	W 8-4	1 Q	New Zealand (NZL); L 4-6	Great Britain (GBR); W 7-5	3rd place, bronze medalist(s)
Francisco Beltran; Antonio Cid; Pedro Cordero; Jose Jarvier Curto	Mixed team BC1-2	Norway (NOR)	W 14-0	1 Q	New Zealand (NZL); L 4-6	Great Britain (GBR); W 7-5	3rd place, bronze medalist(s)
Santiago Pesquera; José Manuel Rodríguez	Mixed pairs BC3	Jackson (NZL) / Dijkstra (NZL)	W 5-4	1 Q	Gauthier (CAN) / Kabush (CAN); W 6-0	Hyeon (KOR) / Hoon (KOR); L 1-4	2nd place, silver medalist(s)
Santiago Pesquera; José Manuel Rodríguez	Mixed pairs BC3	Cronin (IRL) / O'Grady (IRL)	W 3-1	1 Q	Gauthier (CAN) / Kabush (CAN); W 6-0	Hyeon (KOR) / Hoon (KOR); L 1-4	2nd place, silver medalist(s)
Santiago Pesquera; José Manuel Rodríguez	Mixed pairs BC3	Bidlas (CZE) / Krenek (CZE)	W 6-4	1 Q	Gauthier (CAN) / Kabush (CAN); W 6-0	Hyeon (KOR) / Hoon (KOR); L 1-4	2nd place, silver medalist(s)
Jose Maria Dueso; Jose Vicente Gomez	Mixed pairs BC4	Chi (HKG) / Wing (HKG)	L 3-6	5	did not advance		
Jose Maria Dueso; Jose Vicente Gomez	Mixed pairs BC4	de Oliveira Pereira (POR) / Valentim (POR)	L 3-6	5	did not advance		
Jose Maria Dueso; Jose Vicente Gomez	Mixed pairs BC4	Beres (HUN) / Gyurkota (HUN)	L 3-5	5	did not advance		
Jose Maria Dueso; Jose Vicente Gomez	Mixed pairs BC4	Durkovic (SVK) / Streharsky (SVK)	L 2-5	5	did not advance		
Jose Maria Dueso; Jose Vicente Gomez	Mixed pairs BC4	Gauthier (CAN) / Vandervies (CAN)	W 7-1	5	did not advance		

=== Cycling ===
==== Men's road ====
Athlete	Event	Time	Rank
Roberto Alcaide	Men's road race / time trial LC2	-	2nd place, silver medalist(s)
Maurice Eckhard	Men's road race / time trial CP div 3	1:20:23	7
Antonio Garcia	Men's road race / time trial LC3	-	1st place, gold medalist(s)
Amador Granado	Men's road race / time trial LC2	2:19:01	10
Juanjo Mendez	Men's road race / time trial LC4	1:31:25	4
Javier Otxoa	Men's road race / time trial CP div 3	1:17:59	1st place, gold medalist(s)
Miguel Angel Clemente; Ignacio Soler (pilot)	Men's road race / time trial tandem B1-3	-	4
Juan Suarez; Francisco Gonzalez (pilot)	Men's road race / time trial tandem B1-3	-	9
Christian Venge; David Llaurado (pilot)	Men's road race / time trial tandem B1-3	3:05.51	2nd place, silver medalist(s)

==== Men's track ====
Athlete	Event	Qualifying		1st round		Final	
Athlete	Event	Time	Rank	Time	Rank	Opposition Time	Rank
Roberto Alcaide	Men's individual pursuit LC2	5:00.82	1 Q	Kaiblinger (AUT); W 4:57.94	1 Q	Ježek (CZE); W 4:58.59	1st place, gold medalist(s)
Maurice Eckhard	Men's 1km time trial CP div 3/4	N/A				1:19.09	14
Maurice Eckhard	Men's individual pursuit CP div 3	4:08.55	4 q			Panazzolo (AUS); L 4:07.41	4
Antonio Garcia	Men's 1km time trial LC1-4	N/A				1:10.80	8
Antonio Garcia	Men's individual pursuit LC3	4:09.74 PR	1 Q	Marquez (VEN); W 4:08.61	3 q	Macchi (ITA); L 4:08.33	4
Amador Granado	Men's 1km time trial LC1-4	N/A				1:12.88	13
Amador Granado	Men's individual pursuit LC2	5:36.34	7 Q	Ježek (CZE); OVL	-	did not advance	
Juanjo Mendez	Men's 1km time trial LC1-4	N/A				1:14.49	20
Juanjo Mendez	Men's individual pursuit LC4	4:31.28	2 Q	N/A		Teuber (GER); OVL	2nd place, silver medalist(s)
Javier Otxoa	Men's 1km time trial CP div 3/4	N/A				1:13.28	5
Javier Otxoa	Men's individual pursuit CP div 3	3:57.48 WR	1 Q	N/A		Kenny (GBR); L 3:54.17	2nd place, silver medalist(s)
Miguel Angel Clemente; Ignacio Soler (pilot)	Men's 1km time trial tandem B1-3	N/A				1:08.45	15
Miguel Angel Clemente; Ignacio Soler (pilot)	Men's individual pursuit tandem B1-3	4:36.38	5	Venge (ESP)/ Llaurado (ESP); L 4:37.32	5	did not advance	
Juan Suarez; Francisco Gonzalez (pilot)	Men's 1km time trial tandem B1-3	N/A				1:08.51	14
Juan Suarez; Francisco Gonzalez (pilot)	Men's individual pursuit tandem B1-3	4:38.95	7	Mulder (NED)/ Schoots (NED); OVL	-	did not advance	
Christian Venge; David Llaurado	Men's individual pursuit tandem B1-3	4:33.73	4	Soler (ESP)/ Clemente (ESP); W 4:32.96	2 Q	Sharpe (GBR)/ Hunter (GBR); L 4:33.49	4
Roberto Alcaide; Amador Granado; Javier Otxoa	Men's team sprint LC1-4/CP 3/4	58.517	6	France (FRA); L 57.427	6	did not advance	

==== Women's road ====
Athlete	Event	Time	Rank
Beatriz Eva Grande; Ana Miguelez (pilot)	Women's road race / time trial tandem B1-3	-	10

==== Women's track ====
Athlete	Event	Qualification		Final	
Athlete	Event	Time	Rank	Opposition Time	Rank
Beatriz Eva Grande; Ana Miguelez	Women's 1km time trial tandem B1-3	N/A		1:18.49	11
Beatriz Eva Grande; Ana Miguelez	Women's individual pursuit tandem B1-3	3:58.18	9	did not advance	

=== Goalball ===
==== Men's tournament ====
Spain's men's goalball team didn't win any medals - they were ranked 6th out of 12.

==== Players ====
- Roberto Abenia
- Jose Daniel Fernandez
- Vicente Galiana
- Ignacio Garrido
- Jose Perez
- Tomas Rubio

==== Results ====
Game	Match	Score	Rank
1	Spain vs. South Korea (KOR)	9 - 8	1 Q
2	Spain vs. Finland (FIN)	3 - 3	1 Q
3	Spain vs. Hungary (HUN)	3 - 2	1 Q
4	Spain vs. Lithuania (LTU)	4 - 1	1 Q
5	Spain vs. Slovenia (SLO)	4 - 1	1 Q
Quarterfinals	Spain vs. United States (USA)	1 - 5	L
Semi finals (5th - 8th)	Spain vs. Hungary (HUN)	4 - 1	W
Fifth place	Spain vs. Finland (FIN)	3 - 4	6

=== Judo ===
==== Men ====
Athlete	Event	Preliminary	Quarterfinals	Semifinals	Repechage round 1	Repechage round 2	Final/ Bronze medal contest
Athlete	Event	Opposition Result	Opposition Result	Opposition Result	Opposition Result	Opposition Result	Opposition Result
Fermin Campos Ariza	+100kg	Bye	Osewald (GER); W 0011-0000S	Zakiyev (AZE); L 0000-1010	N/A		Amakawa (JPN); L 0001S-0201S
Raúl Fernández	90kg	Bye	Park (KOR); L 0000S-1002	N/A	Dinato (BRA); W 1000-0000	Clarke (AUS); W 1000-0000	Cugnon (FRA); W FG (bronze)
David Garcia del Valle	66kg	Soutios (GRE); W 1010-0000	Dae (KOR); W 0200C-0010K	Cheng (TPE); W 0200-0000	N/A		Fujimoto (JPN); L 0000-0010 (silver)
Salvador Gonzalez	81kg	Bye	Vlasov (RUS); L 0000S-0001	N/A	Morgan (CAN); L 0000-1000	did not advance	
Rafael Moreno	100kg	Bye	Ming (CHN); L 0010S-1001C	N/A	Hokmabad (IRI); L 0000-1000	did not advance	

==== Women ====
Athlete	Event	Quarterfinals	Semifinals	Final/ Bronze medal contest
Athlete	Event	Opposition Result	Opposition Result	Opposition Result
Marta Arce Payno	57kg	Silva (BRA); W 1111S-0001	Keramida (GRE); W 1000–0000	Brussig (GER); L 0000-1000 (silver)
Carmen Herrera	70kg	Nagy (HUN); W 0020-0000	Savostyanova (RUS); W 1030-0010	Pierce (USA); W 1100-0000 (gold)
Monica Merenciano	63kg	Huettler (GER); L 0010-0200	N/A	Zhang (CHN); W 1000-0000 (bronze)
Maria Olmedo	+70kg	N/A	Ivanova (RUS); W 0200-0000	Xue (CHN); L 0000-1000 (silver)

=== Shooting ===
Athlete	Event	Qualification		Final		
Athlete	Event	Score	Rank	Score	Total	Rank
Miguel Orobitg	Mixed 10m air rifle prone SH1	598	9	did not advance		
Miguel Orobitg	Men's 10m air rifle standing SH1	569	17	did not advance		
Miguel Orobitg	Men's 50m free rifle 3x40 SH1	DNF	24	did not advance		
Juan Antonio Saavedra	Mixed 10m air rifle prone SH2	600 =WR	1 Q	104.1	704.1	4
Juan Antonio Saavedra	Mixed 10m air rifle standing SH2	586	20	did not advance		
Francisco Angel Soriano	Men's 10m air pistol SH1	549	26	did not advance		
Francisco Angel Soriano	Mixed 25m pistol SH1	539	18	did not advance		
Francisco Angel Soriano	Mixed 50m pistol SH1	495	24	did not advance		

=== Swimming ===
==== Men ====
Athlete	Class	Event	Heats		Final	
Athlete	Class	Event	Result	Rank	Result	Rank
Luis Arevalo	S13	100m freestyle	1:02.62	13	did not advance	
Luis Arevalo	S13	400m freestyle	4:52.47	8 Q	4:47.40	7
Luis Arevalo	SB13	100m breaststroke	1:18.96	10	did not advance	
Luis Arevalo	SM13	200m individual medley	2:33.97	6 Q	2:34.07	6
Pablo Cimadevila	S6	50m butterfly	40.78	13	did not advance	
Pablo Cimadevila	SB4	100m breaststroke	1:53.26	5 Q	1:51.20	4
Pablo Cimadevila	SM5	200m individual medley	3:19.34	4 Q	3:18.10	4
Jesus Collado	S9	50m freestyle	28.25	13	did not advance	
Jesus Collado	S9	100m freestyle	1:00.25	6 Q	59.46	4
Jesus Collado	S9	100m backstroke	1:09.08	5 Q	1:07.00	3rd place, bronze medalist(s)
Jesus Collado	S9	100m butterfly	1:05.13	2 Q	1:02.66 WR	1st place, gold medalist(s)
Javier Crespo	SB9	100m breaststroke	1:18.95	14	did not advance	
Miguel Deniz	S11	50m freestyle	DSQ		did not advance	
Miguel Deniz	S11	100m freestyle	1:05.17	5 Q	1:04.43	5
Miguel Deniz	S11	400m freestyle	5:17.32	4 Q	5:01.65	4
Miguel Deniz	S11	100m backstroke	1:18.57	8 Q	1:16.45	6
Miguel Deniz	SB11	100m breaststroke	1:32.25	10	did not advance	
Miguel Deniz	SM11	200m individual medley	N/A		2:44.61	5
Oliver Deniz	S3	50m freestyle	1:03.06	10	did not advance	
Oliver Deniz	S3	100m freestyle	2:12.74	10	did not advance	
Oliver Deniz	S3	200m freestyle	4:37.37	9	did not advance	
Oliver Deniz	S3	50m backstroke	1:03.75	7 Q	1:04.72	8
Oliver Deniz	SB2	50m breaststroke	1:24.75	10	did not advance	
Ivan Fernandez	S4	200m freestyle	4:08.83	15	did not advance	
Ivan Fernandez	S4	50m backstroke	55.88	11	did not advance	
Enrique Floriano	S12	100m freestyle	58.82	6	58.69	6
Enrique Floriano	S12	400m freestyle	4:30.01	2 Q	4:18.40	2nd place, silver medalist(s)
Enrique Floriano	S12	100m backstroke	1:08.36	7 Q	1:09.32	7
Enrique Floriano	S12	100m butterfly	1:03.23	3 Q	1:03.23	4
Enrique Floriano	SB12	100m breaststroke	1:16.28	7 Q	1:16.96	7
Enrique Floriano	SM12	200m individual medley	2:22.28	2 Q	2:18.02	3rd place, bronze medalist(s)
Pablo Galindo	S9	100m butterfly	1:08.18	13	did not advance	
Pablo Galindo	SB9	100m breaststroke	1:18.04	10	did not advance	
Arkaitz Garcia	S4	50m freestyle	52.61	11	did not advance	
Arkaitz Garcia	S4	200m freestyle	4:05.58	14	did not advance	
Arkaitz Garcia	S4	50m backstroke	56.55	12	did not advance	
Albert Gelis	S12	100m freestyle	1:00.60	15	did not advance	
Albert Gelis	S12	100m backstroke	1:07.38	5 Q	1:05.82	5
Albert Gelis	S12	100m butterfly	1:07.61	8 Q	1:06.21	8
Juan Diego Gil	SB12	100m breaststroke	1:22.08	14	did not advance	
Juan Diego Gil	SM12	200m individual medley	2:33.33	10	did not advance	
Vicente Gil	SB3	50m breaststroke	54.32	2 Q	55.03	2nd place, silver medalist(s)
Javier Goni	S11	50m freestyle	30.48	10	did not advance	
Javier Goni	S11	100m freestyle	1:10.81	13	did not advance	
Javier Goni	S11	400m freestyle	5:19.43	5 Q	5:16.03	6
Javier Goni	S11	100m backstroke	1:14.46	2 Q	1:11.71	2nd place, silver medalist(s)
Jordi Gordillo	S5	50m freestyle	38.29	5 Q	38.91	6
Jordi Gordillo	S5	100m freestyle	1:28.82	6 Q	1:28.71	6
Juan Francisco Jiminez	S8	100m freestyle	1:05.97	9	did not advance	
Juan Francisco Jiminez	S8	400m freestyle	5:00.80	4 Q	4:55.50	4
David Levecq	S10	50m freestyle	25.98	5 Q	25.52	2nd place, silver medalist(s)
David Levecq	S10	100m freestyle	56.87	2 Q	56.32	2nd place, silver medalist(s)
David Levecq	S10	100m butterfly	1:01.40	3 Q	1:01.07	4
Daniel Llambrich	S12	100m freestyle	1:01.59	16	did not advance	
Daniel Llambrich	SB12	100m breaststroke	1:16.93	8 Q	1:17.15	8
Miguel Luque	S5	50m butterfly	47.90	8 Q	51.72	8
Miguel Luque	SB3	50m breaststroke	52.81	1 Q	51.27	1st place, gold medalist(s)
Miguel Luque	SM4	150m individual medley	2:51.59	4 Q	2:48.66	5
Enhamed Mohamed	S11	50m freestyle	30.13	9	did not advance	
Enhamed Mohamed	S11	100m freestyle	1:05.96	6 Q	1:05.55	6
Enhamed Mohamed	S11	400m freestyle	5:12.39	3 Q	5:01.64	3rd place, bronze medalist(s)
Enhamed Mohamed	S11	100m butterfly	1:18.02	5 Q	1:11.59	3rd place, bronze medalist(s)
Enhamed Mohamed	SM11	200m individual medley	N/A		DSQ	
Carlos Molina	S3	50m freestyle	1:25.43	13	did not advance	
Carlos Molina	S3	100m freestyle	2:43.90	12	did not advance	
Carlos Molina	S3	200m freestyle	5:33.11	12	did not advance	
Carlos Molina	S3	50m backstroke	1:06.28	9	did not advance	
Daniel Molina	S10	100m backstroke	1:12.10	15	did not advance	
Luis Alberto Nunez	S9	50m freestyle	27.40	5 Q	27.61	6
Luis Alberto Nunez	S9	100m freestyle	1:01.10	10	did not advance	
Luis Alberto Nunez	S9	100m backstroke	1:11.31	14	did not advance	
Israel Oliver	S12	400m freestyle	4:42.31	6 Q	4:43.00	6
Israel Oliver	S12	100m backstroke	1:15.24	12	did not advance	
Israel Oliver	S12	100m butterfly	1:03.17	2 Q	1:03.15	3rd place, bronze medalist(s)
Israel Oliver	SM12	200m individual medley	2:29.31	7 Q	2:28.40	7
Ricardo Oribe	S4	50m freestyle	40.31	3 Q	39.67	4
Ricardo Oribe	S4	100m freestyle	1:29.38	3 Q	1:26.58	3rd place, bronze medalist(s)
Ricardo Oribe	S4	200m freestyle	3:08.74	3 Q	3:02.25	2nd place, silver medalist(s)
Jose Arnulfo Ramos	S7	50m butterfly	37.57	11	did not advance	
Sebastián Rodríguez	S5	50m freestyle	36.19	2 Q	32.62 WR	1st place, gold medalist(s)
Sebastián Rodríguez	S5	100m freestyle	1:20.78	4 Q	1:13.39 WR	1st place, gold medalist(s)
Sebastián Rodríguez	S5	200m freestyle	2:58.09	4 Q	2:41.87 WR	1st place, gold medalist(s)
Samuel Soler	S3	50m freestyle	1:03.96	12	did not advance	
Samuel Soler	S3	100m freestyle	2:09.25	9	did not advance	
Samuel Soler	S3	200m freestyle	4:17.64	6 Q	4:16.79	7
Samuel Soler	S3	50m backstroke	1:01.02	5 Q	1:02.72	6
Javier Torres	S5	200m freestyle	3:21.16	6 Q	3:12.65	6
Javier Torres	S5	50m butterfly	46.27	7 Q	46.08	6
Javier Torres	SB3	50m breaststroke	56.46	4 Q	55.35	4
Javier Torres	SM4	150m individual medley	2:44.97	2 Q	2:40.94	2nd place, silver medalist(s)
Daniel Vidal	S6	50m freestyle	32.33	2 Q	31.37	2nd place, silver medalist(s)
Daniel Vidal	S6	100m freestyle	1:12.15	8 Q	1:10.83	5
Daniel Vidal	S6	50m butterfly	34.53	5 Q	33.56	3rd place, bronze medalist(s)
Jordi Gordillo; Ricardo Oribe; Sebastián Rodríguez; Javier Torres	N/A	4 x 50m freestyle relay (20pts)	2:46.77	7 Q	DNS	
Jesus Collado; David Levecq; Luis Alberto Nunez; Daniel Vidal	N/A	4 × 100 m freestyle relay (34pts)	4:13.24	6 Q	4:06.29	4
Enrique Floriano; Albert Gelis; Juan Diego Gil; Daniel Llambrich	N/A	4 × 100 m freestyle relay (49pts)	N/A		3:59.11	4
Jordi Gordillo; Miguel Luque; Jose Arnulfo Ramos; Javier Torres	N/A	4 x 50m medley relay (20pts)	2:54.97	5 Q	2:44.65	3rd place, bronze medalist(s)
Javier Crespo; David Levecq; Luis Alberto Nunez; Daniel Vidal	N/A	4 × 100 m medley relay (34pts)	4:40.68	6 Q	4:33.90	5
Enrique Floriano; Albert Gelis; Daniel Llambrich; Israel Oliver	N/A	4 × 100 m medley relay (49pts)	N/A		4:20.85	2nd place, silver medalist(s)

==== Women ====
Athlete	Class	Event	Heats		Final	
Athlete	Class	Event	Result	Rank	Result	Rank
Lidia Banos	S12	50m freestyle	33.09	14	did not advance	
Lidia Banos	S12	100m freestyle	1:09.42	10	did not advance	
Lidia Banos	S12	400m freestyle	N/A		5:09.26	5
Lidia Banos	S12	100m butterfly	1:23.79	8 Q	1:23.02	7
Dacil Cabrera	S7	50m freestyle	39.35	13	did not advance	
Dacil Cabrera	S7	100m freestyle	1:24.61	11	did not advance	
Dacil Cabrera	S7	400m freestyle	6:05.43	5 Q	6:02.05	5
Regina Cachan	S4	50m backstroke	1:12.50	9	did not advance	
Regina Cachan	S4	50m butterfly	N/A		1:19.15	5
Montserrat Canals	S7	50m butterfly	47.83	10	did not advance	
Montserrat Canals	SM7	200m individual medley	3:42.05	11	did not advance	
Vanesa Capo	S6	50m freestyle	41.04	9	did not advance	
Vanesa Capo	S6	100m freestyle	1:28.41	9	did not advance	
Vanesa Capo	S6	400m freestyle	6:43.40	7 Q	6:50.40	7
Vanesa Capo	S6	100m backstroke	1:48.54	10	did not advance	
Sara Carracelas	S2	50m freestyle	N/A		1:18.60	1st place, gold medalist(s)
Sara Carracelas	S2	100m freestyle	N/A		2:49.38	1st place, gold medalist(s)
Sara Carracelas	S2	50m backstroke	N/A		1:19.25 PR	1st place, gold medalist(s)
Carla Casals	S12	50m freestyle	31.48	8 Q	31.50	8
Carla Casals	S12	100m freestyle	1:08.91	9	did not advance	
Carla Casals	SB12	100m breaststroke	1:31.03	8 Q	1:31.58	8
Carla Casals	SM12	200m individual medley	2:57.11	8 Q	2:59.73	8
Deborah Font	S12	50m freestyle	29.97	4 Q	29.80	5
Deborah Font	S12	100m freestyle	1:05.37	5 Q	1:04.39	4
Deborah Font	S12	400m freestyle	N/A		4:52.16	2nd place, silver medalist(s)
Deborah Font	SB12	100m breaststroke	1:23.61	2 Q	1:23.63	2nd place, silver medalist(s)
Deborah Font	SM12	200m individual medley	2:42.43	2 Q	2:41.08	3rd place, bronze medalist(s)
Ana Garcia-Arcicollar	S12	400m freestyle	N/A		4:51.20 WR	1st place, gold medalist(s)
Ana Garcia-Arcicollar	S12	100m backstroke	N/A		1:15.82	4
Ana Garcia-Arcicollar	S12	100m butterfly	1:14.73	3 Q	1:12.83	3rd place, bronze medalist(s)
Ana Garcia-Arcicollar	SM12	200m individual medley	2:44.63	4 Q	2:42.96	5
Anais Garcia	S11	50m freestyle	34.29	4 Q	33.71	5
Anais Garcia	S11	100m freestyle	1:12.53	1 Q	DNS	
Anais Garcia	SB11	100m breaststroke	1:47.16	8 Q	1:46.89	7
Noelia Garcia	S6	100m freestyle	1:40.32	14	did not advance	
Noelia Garcia	S6	400m freestyle	7:10.33	8 Q	7:03.84	8
Noelia Garcia	SB5	100m breaststroke	N/A		2:01.16	4
Sonia Garcia	S3	50m freestyle	1:22.96	8 Q	1:24.81	8
Sonia Garcia	S3	100m freestyle	3:02.20	9	did not advance	
Sonia Garcia	S3	50m backstroke	N/A		1:25.56	7
Sandra Gomez	S12	100m backstroke	N/A		1:18.74	6
Sandra Gomez	S12	100m butterfly	1:22.06	6 Q	1:20.20	6
Sandra Gomez	SB12	100m breaststroke	1:21.97 WR	1 Q	1:21.41 WR	1st place, gold medalist(s)
Esther Morales Fernández	S10	50m freestyle	30.59	3 Q	30.41	3rd place, bronze medalist(s)
Esther Morales Fernández	S10	100m freestyle	1:07.02	6 Q	1:05.91	4
Esther Morales Fernández	S10	100m backstroke	N/A		1:16.99	3rd place, bronze medalist(s)
Esther Morales Fernández	S10	100m butterfly	1:20.81	5 Q	1:20.73	6
Almudena de la Osa	S10	50m freestyle	32.03	12	did not advance	
Almudena de la Osa	S10	100m freestyle	1:11.75	12	did not advance	
Teresa Perales	S5	50m freestyle	37.42	1 Q	37.62	3rd place, bronze medalist(s)
Teresa Perales	S5	100m freestyle	1:19.68	1 Q	1:19.96	1st place, gold medalist(s)
Teresa Perales	S5	50m backstroke	46.17	3 Q	45.39	3rd place, bronze medalist(s)
Teresa Perales	S5	50m butterfly	N/A		44.70	1st place, gold medalist(s)
Teresa Perales	SB4	100m breaststroke	2:03.28	5 Q	2:00.93	3rd place, bronze medalist(s)
Amaia Zuazua	S3	50m freestyle	1:16.34	5 Q	1:15.53	6
Amaia Zuazua	S3	100m freestyle	2:34.45	5 Q	2:34.14	5
Amaia Zuazua	S3	50m backstroke	N/A		1:16.54	5
Vanesa Capo; Noelia Garcia; Teresa Perales; Amaia Zuazua	N/A	4 x 50m freestyle relay (20pts)	N/A		3:16.00	4
Dacil Cabrera; Montserrat Canals; Vanesa Capo; Almudena de la Osa	N/A	4 × 100 m freestyle relay (34pts)	N/A		5:49.84	8
Regina Cachan; Vanesa Capo; Noelia Garcia; Teresa Perales	N/A	4 x 50m medley relay (20pts)	N/A		3:31.47	2nd place, silver medalist(s)

=== Table tennis ===
Athlete	Event	Preliminaries				Round of 16	Quarterfinals	Semifinals	Final / BM	
Athlete	Event	Opposition Result	Opposition Result	Opposition Result	Rank	Opposition Result	Opposition Result	Opposition Result	Opposition Result	Rank
Enrique Agudo	Men's singles 10	Altaraz (ISR); L 0-3	Karabec (CZE); W/O	N/A	2	N/A	Ge (CHN); L 1-3	did not advance		
Jordi Morales	Men's singles 7	Furlan (ITA); L 3-2	Duracka (CZE); W 3-0	Lima (BRA); W 3-2	2	N/A	Qin (CHN); W 3-2	Messi (FRA); L 0-3	Furlan (ITA); W 3-0	3rd place, bronze medalist(s)
Tomas Piñas	Men's singles 3	Kylevik (SWE); W 3-2	Wu (TPE); W 3-2	Valka (SVK); W 3–0	1	Kramminger (AUT); W 3-2	Guertler (GER); W 3-0	Kim (KOR); L 0-3	Kesler (SCG); L 0-3	4
Manuel Robles	Men's singles 5	Bolldén (SWE); W 3-0	Nilsen (RSA); W 3-1	Kalyvas (GRE); W 3-0	1	Bye	Jung (KOR); L 3-2	did not advance		
Miguel Rodríguez	Men's singles 3	Kim (KOR); L 1-3	Robinson (GBR); L 2-3	Rosnes (NOR); W 3-0	3	did not advance				
Jose Manuel Ruiz	Men's singles 10	Ge (CHN); L 2-3	Bereczki (HUN); W 3-0	N/A	2	N/A	Altaratz (ISR); W 3-0	Andersson (SWE); L 2-3	Ge (CHN); L 2-3	4
Alvaro Valera	Men's singles 8	Li (CHN); L 1-3	Hu (TPE); W 3-2	Soyer (FRA); W 3-1	2	Schaller (FRA); L 0-3	did not advance			
Jose Manuel Ruiz; Enrique Agudo	Men's team 10	China (CHN); L 1-3	France (FRA); L 2-3	Israel (ISR); W 3-1	3	did not advance				
Jordi Morales; Alvaro Valera	Men's team 8	Belgium (BEL); W 3-1	China (CHN); L 3-0	Czech Republic (CZE); W 3-0	3	did not advance				
Tomas Piñas; Miguel Rodríguez	Men's team 3	France (FRA); L 1-3	South Korea (KOR); L 1-3	Slovakia (SVK); W 3-2	3	did not advance				

=== Wheelchair fencing ===
==== Men ====
Athlete	Event	Qualification			Round of 16	Quarterfinal	Semifinal	Final / BM	
Athlete	Event	Opposition	Score	Rank	Opposition Score	Opposition Score	Opposition Score	Opposition Score	Rank
Juan Arnau	Men's foil B	Ching (HKG)	L 0-5	5	did not advance				
Juan Arnau	Men's foil B	Szekeres (HUN)	L 0-5	5	did not advance				
Juan Arnau	Men's foil B	Mari (ITA)	L 0-5	5	did not advance				
Juan Arnau	Men's foil B	Durand (FRA)	L 0-5	5	did not advance				
Juan Arnau	Men's sabre B	Czop (POL)	L 1-5	5 Q	Hui (HKG); L 3-15	did not advance			
Juan Arnau	Men's sabre B	Mari (ITA)	L 1-5	5 Q	Hui (HKG); L 3-15	did not advance			
Juan Arnau	Men's sabre B	Hui (HKG)	L 1-5	5 Q	Hui (HKG); L 3-15	did not advance			
Juan Arnau	Men's sabre B	Park (KOR)	L 2-5	5 Q	Hui (HKG); L 3-15	did not advance			
Juan Arnau	Men's sabre B	Moreno (USA)	W 5-3	5 Q	Hui (HKG); L 3-15	did not advance			
Jesus Fernandez	Men's foil A	Zhang (CHN)	L 4-5	5	did not advance				
Jesus Fernandez	Men's foil A	Makowski (POL)	L 0-5	5	did not advance				
Jesus Fernandez	Men's foil A	Chan (HKG)	L 2-5	5	did not advance				
Jesus Fernandez	Men's foil A	van der Wege (USA)	L 0-5	5	did not advance				
Jesus Fernandez	Men's foil A	Khder (IRQ)	W 5-1	5	did not advance				
Jesus Fernandez	Men's sabre A	Makowski (POL)	L 4-5	4 Q	More (FRA); L 8-15	did not advance			
Jesus Fernandez	Men's sabre A	El Assine (FRA)	L 0-5	4 Q	More (FRA); L 8-15	did not advance			
Jesus Fernandez	Men's sabre A	Chan (HKG)	W 5-2	4 Q	More (FRA); L 8-15	did not advance			
Jesus Fernandez	Men's sabre A	Doeme (HUN)	L 1-5	4 Q	More (FRA); L 8-15	did not advance			
Jesus Fernandez	Men's sabre A	Khder (IRQ)	W 5-2	4 Q	More (FRA); L 8-15	did not advance			
Alejandro Rodriguez	Men's épée A	Al Qallaf (KUW)	L 3-5	7	did not advance				
Alejandro Rodriguez	Men's épée A	Lipinski (GER)	L 1-5	7	did not advance				
Alejandro Rodriguez	Men's épée A	Jablonski (POL)	L 4-5	7	did not advance				
Alejandro Rodriguez	Men's épée A	Yun (HKG)	L 2-5	7	did not advance				
Alejandro Rodriguez	Men's épée A	More (FRA)	L 3-5	7	did not advance				
Alejandro Rodriguez	Men's épée A	Peppas (GRE)	L 4-5	7	did not advance				
Alejandro Rodriguez	Men's foil A	Zhang (CHN)	L 0-5	5	did not advance				
Alejandro Rodriguez	Men's foil A	Pellegrini (ITA)	L 3-5	5	did not advance				
Alejandro Rodriguez	Men's foil A	Maillard (FRA)	L 1-5	5	did not advance				
Alejandro Rodriguez	Men's foil A	Almansouri (KUW)	L 0-5	5	did not advance				
Luis Sanchez	Men's épée A	Stanczuk (POL)	L 2-5	6	did not advance				
Luis Sanchez	Men's épée A	Zhang (CHN)	L 2-5	6	did not advance				
Luis Sanchez	Men's épée A	Citerne (FRA)	L 1-5	6	did not advance				
Luis Sanchez	Men's épée A	Ahner (GER)	L 2-5	6	did not advance				
Luis Sanchez	Men's épée A	Almansouri (KUW)	L 3-5	6	did not advance				
Luis Sanchez	Men's sabre A	Pellegrini (ITA)	L 1-5	5	did not advance				
Luis Sanchez	Men's sabre A	Fung (HKG)	L 1-5	5	did not advance				
Luis Sanchez	Men's sabre A	Rodriguez (USA)	L 1-5	5	did not advance				
Luis Sanchez	Men's sabre A	Lipinski (GER)	L 0-5	5	did not advance				
Carlos Soler	Men's épée B	Ching (HKG)	L 1-5	6	did not advance				
Carlos Soler	Men's épée B	Komar (UKR)	L 1-5	6	did not advance				
Carlos Soler	Men's épée B	Park (KOR)	L 2-5	6	did not advance				
Carlos Soler	Men's épée B	Sarri (ITA)	L 4-5	6	did not advance				
Carlos Soler	Men's épée B	Hisakawa (JPN)	L 3-5	6	did not advance				
Alejandro Rodriguez; Luis Sanchez; Carlos Soler	Men's épée team	N/A				Poland (POL); W/O	did not advance		
Juan Arnau; Jesus Fernandez; Alejandro Rodriguez	Men's foil team	N/A				Hong Kong (HKG); L 6-45	5th-8th classification Italy (ITA); L 2-45	7th-8th classification United States (USA); L 6-45	8
Juan Arnau; Jesus Fernandez; Luis Sanchez; Carlos Soler	Men's sabre team	N/A				Hong Kong (HKG); L 15-45	5th-7th classification United States (USA); W 45-41	5th-6th classification Germany (GER); L 34-45	6

==== Women ====
Athlete	Event	Qualification			Round of 16	Quarterfinal	Semifinal	Final / BM	
Athlete	Event	Opposition	Score	Rank	Opposition Score	Opposition Score	Opposition Score	Opposition Score	Rank
Gema Victoria Hassen Bey	Women's épée B	Wyrzykowska (POL)	L 1-5	4 Q	Magnat (FRA); W 15-14	Dani (HUN); L 8-15	did not advance		
Gema Victoria Hassen Bey	Women's épée B	Vettraino (ITA)	L 1-5	4 Q	Magnat (FRA); W 15-14	Dani (HUN); L 8-15	did not advance		
Gema Victoria Hassen Bey	Women's épée B	Lykyanenko (UKR)	L 4-5	4 Q	Magnat (FRA); W 15-14	Dani (HUN); L 8-15	did not advance		
Gema Victoria Hassen Bey	Women's épée B	Masciotra (ARG)	W 5-0	4 Q	Magnat (FRA); W 15-14	Dani (HUN); L 8-15	did not advance		
Gema Victoria Hassen Bey	Women's foil B	Chan (HKG)	L 2-5	2 Q	Bye	Hickey (USA); L 15-3	did not advance		
Gema Victoria Hassen Bey	Women's foil B	Wyrzykowska (POL)	W 5-3	2 Q	Bye	Hickey (USA); L 15-3	did not advance		
Gema Victoria Hassen Bey	Women's foil B	Lykyanenko (UKR)	W 5-1	2 Q	Bye	Hickey (USA); L 15-3	did not advance		
Gema Victoria Hassen Bey	Women's foil B	Masciotra (ARG)	W 5-0	2 Q	Bye	Hickey (USA); L 15-3	did not advance		

=== Wheelchair tennis ===
==== Men ====
Athlete	Class	Event	Round of 64	Round of 32	Round of 16	Quarterfinals	Semifinals	Finals
Athlete	Class	Event	Opposition Result	Opposition Result	Opposition Result	Opposition Result	Opposition Result	Opposition Result
Cristian Mira	Open	Men's singles	Barnes (NZL); W 6–0, 6-4	Stuurman (NED); L 2–6, 0-6	did not advance			
Francesc Tur	Open	Men's singles	Fischer (GRE); W 6–2, 6–2	Legner (AUT); L 1–6, 1-6	did not advance			
Cristian Mira; Francesc Tur	Open	Men's doubles	N/A	Jaroszewski (POL); Kruszelnicki (POL); L 0–6, 1-6	did not advance			

==== Women ====
Athlete	Class	Event	Round of 32	Round of 16	Quarterfinals	Semifinals	Finals
Athlete	Class	Event	Opposition Result	Opposition Result	Opposition Result	Opposition Result	Opposition Result
Maria Dolores Ochoa	Open	Women's singles	Ohmae (JPN); L 2–6, 1-6	did not advance			
Barbara Vidal	Open	Women's singles	Bartczak (POL); L 0–6, 0-6	did not advance			
Maria Dolores Ochoa; Barbara Vidal	Open	Women's doubles	N/A	Erath (SUI); Kalt (SUI); L 3–6, 0-6	did not advance		

== See also ==
- Spain at the Paralympics
- Spain at the 2004 Summer Olympics
