= Portugal at the 2004 Summer Paralympics =

- IPC code: POR
- NPC: Paralympic Committee of Portugal
- Website: www.comiteparalimpicoportugal.pt (in Portuguese and English)

in Athens
- Competitors: 29 in 5 sports
- Medals Ranked 41st: Gold 2 Silver 5 Bronze 5 Total 12

Summer Paralympics appearances (overview)
- 1972; 1976–1980; 1984; 1988; 1992; 1996; 2000; 2004; 2008; 2012; 2016; 2020; 2024

Portugal competed at the 2004 Summer Paralympics in Athens, Greece. The team included 29 athletes, 22 men and 7 women. Competitors from Portugal won 12 medals, including 2 gold, 5 silver and 5 bronze to finish 41st in the medal table.

== Medalists ==
Medal	Name	Sport	Event
Gold	João Paulo Fernandes	Boccia	Mixed individual BC1
Gold	João Paulo Fernandes; Fernando Ferreira; Cristina Gonçalves; António Marques	Boccia	Mixed team BC1/BC2
Silver	Carlos Ferreira	Athletics	Men's 10000m T11
Silver	Carlos Ferreira	Athletics	Men's marathon T11
Silver	Pedro Silva	Boccia	Mixed individual BC2
Silver	Bruno Valentim	Boccia	Mixed individual BC4
Silver	Fernando de Oliveira Pereira; Bruno Valentim	Boccia	Mixed pairs BC4
Bronze	José Alves	Athletics	Men's 400m T13
Bronze	Fernando Ferreira	Boccia	Mixed individual BC2
Bronze	João Martins	Swimming	Men's 50m freestyle S1
Bronze	João Martins	Swimming	Men's 50m backstroke S1
Bronze	Susana Barroso	Swimming	Women's 50m backstroke S3

== Sports ==
=== Athletics ===
==== Men's track ====
Athlete	Class	Event	Heats		Semifinal		Final	
Athlete	Class	Event	Result	Rank	Result	Rank	Result	Rank
José Alves	T13	200m	22.92	5 q	—N/a		DNF	
José Alves	T13	400m	—N/a				50.86	3rd place, bronze medalist(s)
Nuno Alves	T11	5000m	—N/a				16:19.68	5
Carlos Amaral Ferreira	T11	10000m	—N/a				33:17.30	2nd place, silver medalist(s)
Carlos Amaral Ferreira	T11	Marathon	—N/a				2:45:07	2nd place, silver medalist(s)
Firmino Baptista	T11	100m	11.96	11 q	12.09	12	did not advance	
Firmino Baptista	T11	200m	24.34	10 q	24.07	7 B	24.04	1
Paulo de Almeida Coelho	T11	1500m	—N/a				4:26.60	7
Paulo de Almeida Coelho	T11	5000m	—N/a				16:38.45	7
Carlos Lopes	T11	100m	11.87	8 q	11.85	8 B	11.92	3
Carlos Lopes	T11	200m	23.97	3 Q	23.91	5 B	DNF	
José Monteiro	T46	800m	1:58:88	3 Q	—N/a		2:00.39	8
Gabriel Potra	T12	200m	23.30	9 Q	23.34	10	did not advance	
Gabriel Potra	T12	400m	1:09.18	14	did not advance			
Ricardo Vale	T11	1500m	—N/a				DNF	
Ricardo Vale	T11	5000m	—N/a				16.42.72	8
Ricardo Vale	T11	10000m	—N/a				35.02.93	6
José Alves; Firmino Baptista; Carlos Lopes; Gabriel Potra	T11-13	4x100m relay	44.83	5	did not advance			

==== Women's track ====
Athlete	Class	Event	Heats		Semifinal		Final	
Athlete	Class	Event	Result	Rank	Result	Rank	Result	Rank
Odete Fuiza	T12	1500m	—N/a				4:58.63	5

=== Boccia ===
==== Individual events ====
Athlete	Event	Preliminaries			Round of 16	Quarterfinals	Semifinals	Final	
Athlete	Event	Opponent	Opposition Score	Rank	Opposition Score	Opposition Score	Opposition Score	Opposition Score	Rank
Armando Costa	Mixed individual BC3	An (KOR)	W 6-5	1 Q	—N/a	Polychronidis (GRE); W 6-1	Pesquera (ESP); L 2-4	An (KOR); L 4-7	4
Armando Costa	Mixed individual BC3	Dijkstra (NZL)	W 7-3	1 Q	—N/a	Polychronidis (GRE); W 6-1	Pesquera (ESP); L 2-4	An (KOR); L 4-7	4
Armando Costa	Mixed individual BC3	Martin (ESP)	W 5-2	1 Q	—N/a	Polychronidis (GRE); W 6-1	Pesquera (ESP); L 2-4	An (KOR); L 4-7	4
Armando Costa	Mixed individual BC3	Williams (USA)	W 11-1	1 Q	—N/a	Polychronidis (GRE); W 6-1	Pesquera (ESP); L 2-4	An (KOR); L 4-7	4
Fernando de Oliveira Pereira	Mixed individual BC4	Dueso (ESP)	W 5-3	2	did not advance				
Fernando de Oliveira Pereira	Mixed individual BC4	Mourtos (GRE)	W 10-3	2	did not advance				
Fernando de Oliveira Pereira	Mixed individual BC4	Vandervies (CAN)	L 3-7	2	did not advance				
Fernando de Oliveira Pereira	Mixed individual BC4	Ledesma (ARG)	W 3-2	2	did not advance				
Joao Paulo Fernandez	Mixed individual BC1	Sanders (NZL)	L 2-3	2 Q	—N/a	Jorgensen (DEN); W 6-1	Padtong (THA); W 5-1	Aandalen (NOR); W 4-2	1st place, gold medalist(s)
Joao Paulo Fernandez	Mixed individual BC1	Prossegger (AUT)	W 4-0	2 Q	—N/a	Jorgensen (DEN); W 6-1	Padtong (THA); W 5-1	Aandalen (NOR); W 4-2	1st place, gold medalist(s)
Joao Paulo Fernandez	Mixed individual BC1	Robinson (GBR)	W 6-5	2 Q	—N/a	Jorgensen (DEN); W 6-1	Padtong (THA); W 5-1	Aandalen (NOR); W 4-2	1st place, gold medalist(s)
Joao Paulo Fernandez	Mixed individual BC1	Vanhoek (CAN)	W 9-2	2 Q	—N/a	Jorgensen (DEN); W 6-1	Padtong (THA); W 5-1	Aandalen (NOR); W 4-2	1st place, gold medalist(s)
Joao Paulo Fernandez	Mixed individual BC1	Cid (ESP)	W 7-2	2 Q	—N/a	Jorgensen (DEN); W 6-1	Padtong (THA); W 5-1	Aandalen (NOR); W 4-2	1st place, gold medalist(s)
Fernando Ferreira	Mixed individual BC2	Connolly (IRL)	W 9-1	1 Q	Maleemao (THA); W 4-2	Toon (NZL); W 6-0	Curto (ESP); L 3-5	Cordero (ESP); W 8-1	3rd place, bronze medalist(s)
Fernando Ferreira	Mixed individual BC2	Scalise (ARG)	W 4-3	1 Q	Maleemao (THA); W 4-2	Toon (NZL); W 6-0	Curto (ESP); L 3-5	Cordero (ESP); W 8-1	3rd place, bronze medalist(s)
Fernando Ferreira	Mixed individual BC2	Kwok (HKG)	L 3-4	1 Q	Maleemao (THA); W 4-2	Toon (NZL); W 6-0	Curto (ESP); L 3-5	Cordero (ESP); W 8-1	3rd place, bronze medalist(s)
Cristina Goncalves	Mixed individual BC2	Flood (NZL)	L 3-4	2 Q	Steirer (AUT); W 6-2	Silva (POR); L 2-8	did not advance		
Cristina Goncalves	Mixed individual BC2	Woffinden (GBR)	W 7-1	2 Q	Steirer (AUT); W 6-2	Silva (POR); L 2-8	did not advance		
Cristina Goncalves	Mixed individual BC2	Morriss (NZL)	W 10-2	2 Q	Steirer (AUT); W 6-2	Silva (POR); L 2-8	did not advance		
Jose Carlos Macedo	Mixed individual BC3	Hanson (USA)	L 2-4	3	did not advance				
Jose Carlos Macedo	Mixed individual BC3	Polychronidis (GRE)	L 2-7	3	did not advance				
Jose Carlos Macedo	Mixed individual BC3	Cronin (IRL)	W 7-3	3	did not advance				
Jose Carlos Macedo	Mixed individual BC3	Bidlas (CZE)	W 10-0	3	did not advance				
Antonio Marques	Mixed individual BC1	Padtong (THA)	W 4-2	5	did not advance				
Antonio Marques	Mixed individual BC1	Aandalen (NOR)	L 3-5	5	did not advance				
Antonio Marques	Mixed individual BC1	Bak-Pedersen (DEN)	L 0-6	5	did not advance				
Antonio Marques	Mixed individual BC1	Leung (HKG)	L 1-7	5	did not advance				
Antonio Marques	Mixed individual BC1	Wilhelmsen (NOR)	W 11-0	5	did not advance				
Pedro Silva	Mixed individual BC2	McLeod (CAN)	W 16-0	1 Q	Connolly (IRL); W 5-0	Goncalves (POR); W 8-2	Cordero (ESP); W 10-1	Curto (ESP); L 3-7	2nd place, silver medalist(s)
Pedro Silva	Mixed individual BC2	Maleemao (THA)	W 5-3	1 Q	Connolly (IRL); W 5-0	Goncalves (POR); W 8-2	Cordero (ESP); W 10-1	Curto (ESP); L 3-7	2nd place, silver medalist(s)
Pedro Silva	Mixed individual BC2	Olsen (NOR)	W 11-0	1 Q	Connolly (IRL); W 5-0	Goncalves (POR); W 8-2	Cordero (ESP); W 10-1	Curto (ESP); L 3-7	2nd place, silver medalist(s)
Bruno Valentim	Mixed individual BC4	Beres (HUN)	W 6-0	1 Q	—N/a		Streharsky (SVK); W 6-2	Leung (HKG); L 1-5	2nd place, silver medalist(s)
Bruno Valentim	Mixed individual BC4	Gomez (ESP)	W 9-0	1 Q	—N/a		Streharsky (SVK); W 6-2	Leung (HKG); L 1-5	2nd place, silver medalist(s)
Bruno Valentim	Mixed individual BC4	Gyurkota (HUN)	W 4-3	1 Q	—N/a		Streharsky (SVK); W 6-2	Leung (HKG); L 1-5	2nd place, silver medalist(s)
Bruno Valentim	Mixed individual BC4	Chatzipanagiotidou (GRE)	W 10-1	1 Q	—N/a		Streharsky (SVK); W 6-2	Leung (HKG); L 1-5	2nd place, silver medalist(s)

==== Pairs/Team events ====
Athlete	Event	Preliminaries			Semifinals	Final	
Athlete	Event	Opponent	Opposition Score	Rank	Opposition Score	Opposition Score	Rank
Armando Costa; Jose Carlos Macedo	Pairs BC3	Park (KOR) / An (KOR)	L 2-11	3	did not advance		
Armando Costa; Jose Carlos Macedo	Pairs BC3	Gauthier (CAN) / Kabush (CAN)	L 3-4	3	did not advance		
Armando Costa; Jose Carlos Macedo	Pairs BC3	Hanson (USA) / Williams (USA)	W 9-1	3	did not advance		
Fernando de Oliveira Pereira; Bruno Valentim	Pairs BC4	Lau (HKG) / Leung (HKG)	L 5-8	2	—N/a		2nd place, silver medalist(s)
Fernando de Oliveira Pereira; Bruno Valentim	Pairs BC4	Beres (HUN) / Gyurkota (HUN)	L 2-5	2	—N/a		2nd place, silver medalist(s)
Fernando de Oliveira Pereira; Bruno Valentim	Pairs BC4	Durkovic (SVK) / Streharsky (SVK)	W 8-2	2	—N/a		2nd place, silver medalist(s)
Fernando de Oliveira Pereira; Bruno Valentim	Pairs BC4	Gomez (ESP) / Dueso (ESP)	W 6-3	2	—N/a		2nd place, silver medalist(s)
Fernando de Oliveira Pereira; Bruno Valentim	Pairs BC4	Gauthier (CAN) / Vandervies (CAN)	W 9-0	2	—N/a		2nd place, silver medalist(s)
Joao Paulo Fernandez; Fernando Ferreira; Cristina Goncalves; Antonio Marques	Team BC1-2	New Zealand (NZL)	W 5-4	1 Q	Great Britain (GBR); W 9-8	New Zealand (NZL); W 5-4	1st place, gold medalist(s)
Joao Paulo Fernandez; Fernando Ferreira; Cristina Goncalves; Antonio Marques	Team BC1-2	Hong Kong (HKG)	W 4-3	1 Q	Great Britain (GBR); W 9-8	New Zealand (NZL); W 5-4	1st place, gold medalist(s)
Joao Paulo Fernandez; Fernando Ferreira; Cristina Goncalves; Antonio Marques	Team BC1-2	Ireland (IRL)	W 8-3	1 Q	Great Britain (GBR); W 9-8	New Zealand (NZL); W 5-4	1st place, gold medalist(s)
Joao Paulo Fernandez; Fernando Ferreira; Cristina Goncalves; Antonio Marques	Team BC1-2	Thailand (THA)	W 7-3	1 Q	Great Britain (GBR); W 9-8	New Zealand (NZL); W 5-4	1st place, gold medalist(s)
Joao Paulo Fernandez; Fernando Ferreira; Cristina Goncalves; Antonio Marques	Team BC1-2	Denmark (DEN)	W 10-1	1 Q	Great Britain (GBR); W 9-8	New Zealand (NZL); W 5-4	1st place, gold medalist(s)

=== Cycling ===
==== Men's road ====
Athlete	Event	Time	Rank
Augusto Pereira	Men's road race/time trial CP div 3	-	9

=== Equestrian ===
Athlete	Event	Total	
Athlete	Event	Score	Rank
Carlos Pereira	Mixed individual championship test grade III	60.320	14
Carlos Pereira	Mixed individual freestyle test grade III	62.889	13

=== Swimming ===
==== Men ====
Athlete	Class	Event	Heats		Final	
Athlete	Class	Event	Result	Rank	Result	Rank
João Martins	S1	50m freestyle	—N/a		1:37.83	3rd place, bronze medalist(s)
João Martins	S1	100m freestyle	—N/a		4:13.61	6
João Martins	S1	50m backstroke	—N/a		1:47.19	3rd place, bronze medalist(s)
Nelson Lopes	S4	50m backstroke	53.68	6 Q	53.83	6
Nuno Vitorino	S3	200m freestyle	5:33.73	13	did not advance	
Nuno Vitorino	S3	50m backstroke	1:18.60	11	did not advance	

==== Women ====
Athlete	Class	Event	Heats		Final	
Athlete	Class	Event	Result	Rank	Result	Rank
Susana Barroso	S3	50m freestyle	1:16.54	6 Q	1:09.00	4
Susana Barroso	S3	100m freestyle	2:28.95	4 Q	2:32.66	4
Susana Barroso	S3	50m backstroke	—N/a		1:09.32	3rd place, bronze medalist(s)
Leila Marques	S9	400m freestyle	5:18.67	7 Q	5:17.50	6
Leila Marques	S9	100m butterfly	1:17.64	4 Q	1:18.40	7
Leila Marques	SB8	100m breaststroke	1:32.25	5 Q	1:30.63	5
Leila Marques	SM9	200m individual medley	2:54.59	7 Q	2:55.30	8
Maria Joao Morgado	S5	100m freestyle	1:44.99	10	did not advance	
Maria Joao Morgado	S5	200m freestyle	3:45.32	7 Q	3:41.21	6
Perpetua Vaza	S3	50m freestyle	1:18.57	7 Q	1:20.36	7
Perpetua Vaza	S3	100m freestyle	2:51.98	7 Q	2:47.15	7
Perpetua Vaza	S3	50m backstroke	—N/a		1:25.74	8
Susana Barroso; Leila Marques; Maria Joao Morgado; Perpetua Vaza	N/A	4x50m freestyle relay (20pts)	—N/a		3:48.84	5

== See also ==
- Portugal at the Paralympics
- Portugal at the 2004 Summer Olympics
