= New Zealand at the 2004 Summer Paralympics =

- IPC code: NZL
- NPC: Paralympics New Zealand
- Website: paralympics.org.nz

in Athens
- Competitors: 35 in 9 sports
- Medals Ranked 36th: Gold 6 Silver 1 Bronze 3 Total 10

Summer Paralympics appearances (overview)
- 1968; 1972; 1976; 1980; 1984; 1988; 1992; 1996; 2000; 2004; 2008; 2012; 2016; 2020; 2024

New Zealand competed at the 2004 Summer Paralympics in Athens, Greece. The team included 36 athletes, 28 men and 8 women. Competitors from New Zealand won ten medals, including 6 gold, 1 silver and 3 bronze to finish 36th in the medal table.

== Medallists ==
Medal	Name	Sport	Event
Gold	Peter Martin	Athletics	Men's javelin throw F52
Gold	Peter Martin	Athletics	Men's shot put F52
Gold	Tim Prendergast	Athletics	Men's 800 metres T13
Gold	Matt Slade	Athletics	Men's javelin throw F52
Gold	Michael Johnson	Shooting	Mixed air rifle standing SH2
Gold	New Zealand national wheelchair rugby team	Wheelchair rugby	Men's team
Silver	Ross Flood; Jeremy Morriss; Liam Sanders; Maurice Toon	Boccia	Mixed team BC1/BC2
Bronze	Peter Martin	Athletics	Men's discus throw F52
Bronze	Paul Jesson	Cycling	Men's bicycle road race/time trial LC3
Bronze	Daniel Sharp	Swimming	Men's 100m breaststroke SB13

== Sports ==
=== Athletics ===
==== Men's track ====
Athlete	Class	Event	Heats		Semi-final		Final	
Athlete	Class	Event	Result	Rank	Result	Rank	Result	Rank
Tim Prendergast	T13	800m	N/A				1:56.23	1st place, gold medalist(s)
Tim Prendergast	T13	1500m	4:03.65	4 Q	N/A		3:56.03	4
Matt Slade	T37	100m	12.22	2 Q	N/A		12.57	5
Matt Slade	T37	200m	25.18	3 Q	N/A		24.85	1st place, gold medalist(s)

==== Men's field ====
Athlete	Class	Event	Final		
Athlete	Class	Event	Result	Points	Rank
Willie Beattie	F56	Discus	28.34	-	8
Willie Beattie	F56	Shot put	9.56	-	12
Terry Falevaai	F33-34	Shot put	9.37	887	8
Peter Martin	F52	Discus	15.96	-	3rd place, bronze medalist(s)
Peter Martin	F52	Shot put	9.34 WR	-	1st place, gold medalist(s)
Peter Martin	F52-53	Javelin	16.70	1045 WR	1st place, gold medalist(s)
David MacCalman	F52	Shot put	6.97	-	9
David MacCalman	F52-53	Javelin	14.01	877	12

==== Women's track ====
Athlete	Class	Event	Heats		Semi-final		Final	
Athlete	Class	Event	Result	Rank	Result	Rank	Result	Rank
Kate Horan	T46	100m	14.40	10	did not advance			
Kate Horan	T46	800m	1:07.37	8 q	N/A		1:05.79	7

=== Boccia ===
==== Individuals ====
Athlete	Event	Preliminaries			Round of 16	Quarterfinals	Semi-finals	Final	
Athlete	Event	Opponent	Opposition Score	Rank	Opposition Score	Opposition Score	Opposition Score	Opposition Score	Rank
Liam Sanders	Mixed individual BC1	Fernandez (POR)	W 3–2	1 Q	Grossmayer (AUT); L 4–5	did not advance			
Liam Sanders	Mixed individual BC1	Prossegger (AUT)	W 13–4	1 Q	Grossmayer (AUT); L 4–5	did not advance			
Liam Sanders	Mixed individual BC1	Robinson (GBR)	W 6–3	1 Q	Grossmayer (AUT); L 4–5	did not advance			
Liam Sanders	Mixed individual BC1	Vanhoek (CAN)	W 6–2	1 Q	Grossmayer (AUT); L 4–5	did not advance			
Liam Sanders	Mixed individual BC1	Cid (ESP)	W/O	1 Q	Grossmayer (AUT); L 4–5	did not advance			
Ross Flood	Mixed individual BC2	Goncalves (POR)	W 4–3	1 Q	Hayes (IRL); W 9–0	Curto (ESP); L 2–5	did not advance		
Ross Flood	Mixed individual BC2	Woffinden (GBR)	W 4–3	1 Q	Hayes (IRL); W 9–0	Curto (ESP); L 2–5	did not advance		
Ross Flood	Mixed individual BC2	Morriss (NZL)	W 4–2	1 Q	Hayes (IRL); W 9–0	Curto (ESP); L 2–5	did not advance		
Jeremy Morriss	Mixed individual BC2	Flood (NZL)	L 2–4	4	did not advance				
Jeremy Morriss	Mixed individual BC2	Goncalves (POR)	L 2–10	4	did not advance				
Jeremy Morriss	Mixed individual BC2	Woffinden (GBR)	L 1–9	4	did not advance				
Maurice Toon	Mixed individual BC2	Cordero (ESP)	W 5–3	1 Q	Siddiqi (DEN); W 6–5	Ferreira (POR); L 0–6	did not advance		
Maurice Toon	Mixed individual BC2	Lorenzen (DEN)	W 8–1	1 Q	Siddiqi (DEN); W 6–5	Ferreira (POR); L 0–6	did not advance		
Maurice Toon	Mixed individual BC2	Wong (HKG)	W 7–1	1 Q	Siddiqi (DEN); W 6–5	Ferreira (POR); L 0–6	did not advance		
Henk Dijkstra	Mixed individual BC3	Costa (POR)	L 3–7	3	did not advance				
Henk Dijkstra	Mixed individual BC3	An (KOR)	L 2–11	3	did not advance				
Henk Dijkstra	Mixed individual BC3	Martin (ESP)	W 7–1	3	did not advance				
Henk Dijkstra	Mixed individual BC3	Williams (USA)	W 6–1	3	did not advance				
Greig Jackson	Mixed individual BC3	Gauthier (CAN)	L 3–5	3	did not advance				
Greig Jackson	Mixed individual BC3	Rodriguez (ESP)	L 3–4	3	did not advance				
Greig Jackson	Mixed individual BC3	Park (KOR)	W 6–3	3	did not advance				

==== Mixed pairs/teams ====
Athlete	Event	Preliminaries			Semi-finals	Final	
Athlete	Event	Opponent	Opposition Score	Rank	Opposition Score	Opposition Score	Rank
Henk Dijkstra; Greig Jackson	Mixed pairs BC3	Rodriguez (ESP) / Pesquera (ESP)	L 4–5	2 Q	An (KOR) / Park (KOR); L 0–13	Gauthier (CAN) / Kabush (CAN); L 3–4	4
Henk Dijkstra; Greig Jackson	Mixed pairs BC3	Cronin (IRL) / O'Grady (IRL)	W 10–0	2 Q	An (KOR) / Park (KOR); L 0–13	Gauthier (CAN) / Kabush (CAN); L 3–4	4
Henk Dijkstra; Greig Jackson	Mixed pairs BC3	Bidlas (CZE) / Krenek (CZE)	W 10–4	2 Q	An (KOR) / Park (KOR); L 0–13	Gauthier (CAN) / Kabush (CAN); L 3–4	4
Ross Flood; Jeremy Morriss; Liam Sanders; Maurice Toon	Mixed team BC1-2	Portugal (POR)	L 4–5	2 Q	Spain (ESP); W 6–4	Portugal (POR); L 4–5	2nd place, silver medalist(s)
Ross Flood; Jeremy Morriss; Liam Sanders; Maurice Toon	Mixed team BC1-2	Hong Kong (HKG)	W 10–5	2 Q	Spain (ESP); W 6–4	Portugal (POR); L 4–5	2nd place, silver medalist(s)
Ross Flood; Jeremy Morriss; Liam Sanders; Maurice Toon	Mixed team BC1-2	Ireland (IRL)	W 9–3	2 Q	Spain (ESP); W 6–4	Portugal (POR); L 4–5	2nd place, silver medalist(s)
Ross Flood; Jeremy Morriss; Liam Sanders; Maurice Toon	Mixed team BC1-2	Thailand (THA)	W 7–0	2 Q	Spain (ESP); W 6–4	Portugal (POR); L 4–5	2nd place, silver medalist(s)
Ross Flood; Jeremy Morriss; Liam Sanders; Maurice Toon	Mixed team BC1-2	Denmark (DEN)	W 12–0	2 Q	Spain (ESP); W 6–4	Portugal (POR); L 4–5	2nd place, silver medalist(s)

=== Cycling ===
==== Men's road ====
Athlete	Event	Time	Rank
Paul Jesson	Men's road race / time trial LC3	-	3rd place, bronze medalist(s)

==== Men's track ====
Athlete	Event	Qualification		1st round		Final	
Athlete	Event	Time	Rank	Time	Rank	Opposition Time	Rank
Paul Jesson	Men's 1km time trial LC1-4	N/A				DNS	
Paul Jesson	Men's individual pursuit LC3	4:16.26	6	Macchi (ITA); L 4:12.89	7	did not advance	

==== Women's road ====
Athlete	Event	Time	Rank
Fiona Southorn	Women's road time trial	28:24.73	5

==== Women's track ====
Athlete	Event	Qualification		Final	
Athlete	Event	Time	Rank	Opposition Time	Rank
Fiona Southorn	Women's 1km time trial LC1-4/CP 3/4	N/A		1:21.86	7

=== Equestrian ===
Athlete	Event	Total	
Athlete	Event	Score	Rank
Jayne Craike	Mixed individual championship test grade IV	69.484	4
Jayne Craike	Mixed individual freestyle test grade IV	64.636	4

=== Powerlifting ===
==== Men ====
Athlete	Event	Result	Rank
George Taamaru	+100kg	NMR	

=== Shooting ===
Athlete	Event	Qualification		Final		
Athlete	Event	Score	Rank	Score	Total	Rank
Michael Johnson	Mixed 10m air rifle prone SH2	599	9	did not advance		
Michael Johnson	Mixed 10m air rifle standing SH2	600 WR	1 Q	104.3	704.3 =WR	1st place, gold medalist(s)
Colin Willis	Men's 10m air rifle standing SH1	567	18	did not advance		
Colin Willis	Mixed 10m air rifle prone SH1	595	33	did not advance		

=== Swimming ===
==== Men ====
Athlete	Class	Event	Heats		Final	
Athlete	Class	Event	Result	Rank	Result	Rank
Hadleigh Pierson	S6	400m freestyle	5:45.55	8 Q	5:44.09	8
Daniel Sharp	S13	50m freestyle	26.53	5 Q	26.34	5
Daniel Sharp	S13	100m freestyle	58.64	4 Q	58.76	4
Daniel Sharp	S13	400m freestyle	4:45.35	3 Q	4:47.00	6
Daniel Sharp	SB13	100m breaststroke	1:15.65	2 Q	1:12.93	3rd place, bronze medalist(s)

==== Women ====
Athlete	Class	Event	Heats		Final	
Athlete	Class	Event	Result	Rank	Result	Rank
Theresa Griffin	S10	400m freestyle	5:21.40	9	did not advance	
Theresa Griffin	S10	100m backstroke	N/A		1:21.52	7
Theresa Griffin	S10	100m butterfly	1:25.77	8 Q	1:25.68	8
Theresa Griffin	SB9	100m breaststroke	1:31.07	8 Q	1:30.37	8
Theresa Griffin	SM10	200m individual medley	2:51.07	6 Q	2:52.31	7
Miriam Jenkins	S9	400m freestyle	5:28.81	12	did not advance	
Sarah Powell	S9	400m freestyle	5:18.66	6 Q	5:20.53	7

=== Wheelchair rugby ===
The men's rugby team won a gold medal after defeating Canada in the gold medal match.

==== Players ====
- Dan Buckingham
- Stephen Guthrie
- Tim Johnson
- Gary McMurray
- Bill Oughton
- Curtis Palmer
- Sholto Taylor
- Geremy Tinker
- Jai Waite

==== Tournament ====
Game	Match	Score	Rank
1	New Zealand vs. Australia (AUS)	41 – 31	2 Q
2	New Zealand vs. United States (USA)	32 – 35	2 Q
3	New Zealand vs. Japan (JPN)	47 – 35	2 Q
Quarter-finals	New Zealand vs. Belgium (BEL)	40 – 33	W
Semi-finals	New Zealand vs. Great Britain (GBR)	39 – 35	W
Gold medal final	New Zealand vs. Canada (CAN)	31 – 29	1st place, gold medalist(s)

=== Wheelchair tennis ===
==== Men ====
Athlete	Class	Event	Round of 64	Round of 32	Round of 16	Quarterfinals	Semi-finals	Finals
Athlete	Class	Event	Opposition Result	Opposition Result	Opposition Result	Opposition Result	Opposition Result	Opposition Result
Glenn Barnes	Open	Men's singles	Mira (ESP); L 0–6, 4–6	did not advance				

==== Women ====
Athlete	Class	Event	Round of 32	Round of 16	Quarterfinals	Semi-finals	Finals
Athlete	Class	Event	Opposition Result	Opposition Result	Opposition Result	Opposition Result	Opposition Result
Jacqueline Courtier	Open	Women's singles	Chokyu (CAN); L 1–6, 5–7	did not advance			
Tiffiney Perry	Open	Women's singles	Dong (CHN); L 1–6, 0–6	did not advance			
Jacqueline Courtier; Tiffiney Perry	Open	Women's doubles	N/A	Clark (USA) / Verfuerth (USA); L 2–6, 2–6	did not advance		

== See also ==
- New Zealand at the Paralympics
- New Zealand at the 2004 Summer Olympics
