= Boccia at the 2004 Summer Paralympics =

Boccia at the XII Paralympic Games
- Paralympic Boccia
- Venue: Ano Liossia Olympic Hall
- Dates: 23–28 September 2004
- Competitors: 84 from 18 nations

Boccia at the 2004 Summer Paralympics took place in the Ano Liossia Olympic Hall in Athens. Contestants were categorised as follows:

- BC1: players with cerebral palsy, competing with the help of an aide, who can only adjust the playing chair and give a ball to the player.
- BC2: players with cerebral palsy not requiring an aide.
- BC3: players with a very severe locomotor dysfunction, using an assistive device and assisted by an aide, who will remain in the player's box but who must keep his/her back to the court and eyes averted from play.
- BC4: players with other locomotor disabilities, without an aide.

== Participating countries ==
- Argentina (5)
- Austria (4)
- Canada (8)
- Czech Republic (2)
- Denmark (4)
- Great Britain (4)
- Greece (4)
- Hong Kong (6)
- Hungary (2)
- Ireland (6)
- New Zealand (6)
- Norway (4)
- Portugal (9)
- Slovakia (2)
- South Korea (2)
- Spain (9)
- Thailand (4)
- United States (3)

== Medal table ==
Rank	Nation	Gold	Silver	Bronze	Total
1	Portugal (POR)	2	3	1	6
2	Hong Kong (HKG)	2	0	0	2
3	Spain (ESP)	1	2	2	5
4	Canada (CAN)	1	0	1	2
4	South Korea (KOR)	1	0	1	2
6	New Zealand (NZL)	0	1	0	1
6	Norway (NOR)	0	1	0	1
8	Hungary (HUN)	0	0	1	1
8	Thailand (THA)	0	0	1	1
Totals (9 entries)		7	7	7	21

== Medal summary ==
Event	Gold	Silver	Bronze
Individual BC1	João Paulo Fernandes; Portugal	Roger Aandalen; Norway	Pattaya Tadtong; Thailand
Individual BC2	José Javier Curto; Spain	Pedro Silva; Portugal	Fernando Ferreira; Portugal
Individual BC3	Paul Gauthier; Canada	Santiago Pesquera; Spain	An Myung-hoon; South Korea
Individual BC4	Leung Yuk Wing; Hong Kong	Bruno Valentim; Portugal	Jose Maria Dueso; Spain
Team BC1/BC2	Portugal (POR); João Paulo Fernandes; Fernando Ferreira; Cristina Gonçalves; António Marques	New Zealand (NZL); Ross Flood; Jeremy Morriss; Liam Sanders; Maurice Toon	Spain (ESP); Francisco Javier Beltran; Antonio Cid Cortes; Pedro Cordero; José Javier Curto
Pairs BC3	South Korea (KOR); An Myung-hoon; Park Seong-hyeon	Spain (ESP); Santiago Pesquera; José Manuel Rodríguez	Canada (CAN); Paul Gauthier; Alison Kabush
Pairs BC4	Hong Kong (HKG); Yan Chi Lau; Leung Yuk Wing	Portugal (POR); Fernando de Oliveira Pereira; Bruno Valentim	Hungary (HUN); Dezső Béres; József Gyurkota
