= Boccia at the 2004 Summer Paralympics – Team BC1–2 =

Boccia - Mixed Team BC1-BC2 at the XII Paralympic Games
- Paralympic Boccia
- Venue: Ano Liosia Olympic Hall
- Dates: 26–28 September 2004
- Competitors: 12

Medalists
1st place, gold medalist(s)		Antonio Marques; Cristina Goncalves; Fernando Ferreira; Joao Paulo Fernandez	Portugal
2nd place, silver medalist(s)		Ross Flood; Jeremy Morriss; Liam Sanders; Maurice Toon	New Zealand
3rd place, bronze medalist(s)		Francisco Beltran; Antonio Cid; Pedro Cordero; Jose Jarvier Curto	Spain

The Mixed Team BC1-BC2 boccia competition at the 2004 Summer Paralympics was held from 26 to 28 September at the Ano Liosia Olympic Hall.

The event was won by the team representing Portugal.

== Results ==
=== Preliminaries ===
Qualified for final round

==== Pool S ====
Rank	Competitor	MP	W	L	Points	ESP	GBR	AUT	ARG	CAN	NOR
1	Spain	5	4	1	47:17	x	13:1	5:4	7:8	8:4	14:0
2	Great Britain	5	4	1	34:24	1:13	x	11:1	9:0	7:5	6:5
3	Austria	5	3	2	35:22	4:5	1:11	x	5:3	12:3	13:0
4	Argentina	5	2	3	22:32	8:7	0:9	3:5	x	5:4	6:7
5	Canada	5	1	4	22:37	4:8	5:7	3:12	4:5	x	6:5
6	Norway	5	1	4	17:45	0:14	5:6	0:13	7:6	5:6	x

==== Pool T ====
Rank	Competitor	MP	W	L	Points	POR	NZL	HKG	IRL	THA	DEN
1	Portugal	5	5	0	34:14	x	5:4	4:3	8:3	7:3	10:1
2	New Zealand	5	4	1	42:13	4:5	x	10:5	9:3	7:0	12:0
3	Hong Kong	5	2	3	33:25	3:4	5:10	x	9:4	4:5	12:2
4	Ireland	5	2	3	28:30	3:8	3:9	4:9	x	11:1	7:3
5	Thailand	5	2	3	20:32	3:7	0:7	5:4	1:11	x	11:3
6	Denmark	5	0	5	9:52	1:10	0:12	2:12	3:7	3:11	x

=== Competition bracket ===
Semi-finals
Spain	4
New Zealand	6
Portugal	9
Great Britain	8

Final
New Zealand	4
Portugal	5
Third place
Spain	7
Great Britain	5

== Team Lists ==
Spain; Francisco Beltran; Antonio Cid; Pedro Cordero; Jose Jarvier Curto	Great Britain; Anne Woffinden; Nigel Murray; Peter Pearse; Susie Robinson	Austria; Harald Grossmayer; Eva Maria Prossegger; Gerhard Gahleitner; Hubert Steirer	Argentina; Pablo Cortez; Claudio Scalise; Gabriela Villano; Mauricio Ibarburen
Canada; Mirane Lanoix-Boyer; David Vanhoek; Tammy McLeod; Francois Bourbonniere	Norway; Elisabeth Wilhelmsen; Alf Reidar Olsen; Roar Femtegield; Roger Aandalen	Portugal; Antonio Marques; Cristina Goncalves; Fernando Ferreira; Joao Paulo Fernandez	New Zealand; Ross Flood; Jeremy Morriss; Liam Sanders; Maurice Toon
Hong Kong; Wong Wing Hong; Loung John; Kwok Hoi Ying; Leung Mei Yee	Ireland; Martina Murphy; Roberta Connolly; Keith Hayes; Gabriel Shelly	Thailand; Auranee Mongkolpun; Supaporn Maleemao; Pattaya Padtong; Chaiyaporn Taksee	Denmark; Lone Bak-Pedersen; Bent Lorenzen; Mansoor Siddiqi; Henrik Jorgensen
