= Boccia at the 2004 Summer Paralympics – Individual BC2 =

2004 Summer Paralympics boccia

Boccia - Mixed Individual BC2 at the XII Paralympic Games
- Paralympic Boccia
- Venue: Ano Liosia Olympic Hall
- Dates: 23–26 September 2004
- Competitors: 28 from 13 nations

Medalists
1st place, gold medalist(s)		Jose Jarvier Curto	Spain
2nd place, silver medalist(s)		Pedro Silva	Portugal
3rd place, bronze medalist(s)		Fernando Ferreira	Portugal

The Mixed Individual BC2 boccia competition at the 2004 Summer Paralympics was held from 23 to 26 September at the Ano Liosia Olympic Hall.

The event was won by Jose Jarvier Curto, representing Spain.

== Results ==
=== Preliminaries ===
==== Pool E ====
Rank	Competitor	MP	W	L	Points	GBR	IRL	NOR	GRE
1	Nigel Murray (GBR)	2	2	0	13:1	x	8:1	5:0	W/O
2	Keith Hayes (IRL)	2	1	1	6:12	1:8	x	5:4	W/O
3	Roar Femtegield (NOR)	3	1	2	9:12	0:5	4:5	x	5:2
4	Maria Tsilikopoulou (GRE)	1	0	1	2:5	DNS	DNS	2:5	x

==== Pool F ====
Rank	Competitor	MP	W	L	Points	POR	IRL	ARG	HKG
1	Fernando Ferreira (POR)	3	2	1	16:8	x	9:1	4:3	3:4
2	Roberta Connolly (IRL)	3	2	1	9:13	1:9	x	4:1	4:3
3	Claudio Scalise (ARG)	3	1	2	8:9	3:4	1:4	x	4:1
4	Kwok Hoi Ying (HKG)	3	1	2	8:11	4:3	3:4	1:4	x

==== Pool G ====
Rank	Competitor	MP	W	L	Points	NZL	POR	GBR	NZL
1	Ross Flood (NZL)	3	3	0	12:6	x	4:3	4:1	4:2
2	Cristina Goncalves (POR)	3	2	1	20:7	3:4	x	7:1	10:2
3	Anne Woffinden (GBR)	3	1	2	11:12	1:4	1:7	x	9:1
4	Jeremy Morriss (NZL)	3	0	3	5:23	2:4	2:10	1:9	x

==== Pool H ====
Rank	Competitor	MP	W	L	Points	POR	CAN	THA	NOR
1	Pedro Silva (POR)	3	3	0	32:3	x	16:0	5:3	11:0
2	Tammy McLeod (CAN)	3	2	1	8:20	0:16	x	5:2	3:2
3	Supaporn Maleemao (THA)	3	1	2	21:10	3:5	2:5	x	16:0
4	Alf Reidar Olsen (NOR)	3	0	3	2:30	0:11	2:3	0:16	x

==== Pool I ====
Rank	Competitor	MP	W	L	Points	AUT	DEN	THA	IRL
1	Hubert Steirer (AUT)	3	3	0	27:3	x	16:0	4:3	7:0
2	Mansoor Siddiqi (DEN)	3	2	1	14:23	0:16	x	4:3	10:4
3	Auranee Mongkolpun (THA)	3	1	2	16:8	3:4	3:4	x	10:0
4	Martina Murphy (IRL)	3	0	3	4:27	0:7	4:10	0:10	x

==== Pool J ====
Rank	Competitor	MP	W	L	Points	ESP	ARG	HKG	CAN
1	Jose Jarvier Curto (ESP)	3	3	0	19:5	x	6:1	9:3	4:1
2	Pablo Cortez (ARG)	3	2	1	11:11	1:6	x	4:2	6:3
3	Loung John (HKG)	3	1	2	18:13	3:9	2:4	x	13:0
4	Francois Bourbonniere (CAN)	3	0	3	4:23	1:4	3:6	0:13	x

==== Pool K ====
Rank	Competitor	MP	W	L	Points	NZL	ESP	DEN	HKG
1	Maurice Toon (NZL)	3	3	0	20:5	x	5:3	8:1	7:1
2	Pedro Cordero (ESP)	3	2	1	22:8	3:5	x	14:1	5:2
3	Bent Lorenzen (DEN)	3	1	2	7:25	1:8	1:14	x	5:3
4	Wong Wing Hong (HKG)	3	0	3	6:17	1:7	2:5	3:5	x

=== Competition bracket ===
First round
Nigel Murray (GBR)	5
Auranee Mongkolpun (THA)	1
Pedro Cordero (ESP)	4
Pablo Cortez (ARG)	0
Pedro Silva (POR)	5
Roberta Connolly (IRL)	0
Hubert Steirer (AUT)	2
Cristina Goncalves (POR)	6
Fernando Ferreira (POR)	4
Supaporn Maleemao (THA)	2
Maurice Toon (NZL)	6
Mansoor Siddiqi (DEN)	5
Ross Flood (NZL)	9
Keith Hayes (IRL)	0
Jose Jarvier Curto (ESP)	7
Tammy McLeod (CAN)	3

Second round
Nigel Murray (GBR)	1
Pedro Cordero (ESP)	6
Pedro Silva (POR)	8
Cristina Goncalves (POR)	2
Fernando Ferreira (POR)	6
Maurice Toon (NZL)	0
Ross Flood (NZL)	2
Jose Jarvier Curto (ESP)	5

Semifinals
Pedro Cordero (ESP)	1
Pedro Silva (POR)	10
Fernando Ferreira (POR)	3
Jose Jarvier Curto (ESP)	5

Finals
Pedro Silva (POR)	3
Jose Jarvier Curto (ESP)	7
Third place
Pedro Cordero (ESP)	1
Fernando Ferreira (POR)	8
