= Boccia at the 2008 Summer Paralympics – Team BC1–2 =

Team BC1-2 at the XIII Paralympic Games
- Paralympic Boccia
- Venue: Olympic Green Convention Center
- Dates: 10–12 September 2008
- Competitors: 12

Medalists
1st place, gold medalist(s)		Dan Bentley; Nigel Murray; Zoe Robinson; David Smith	Great Britain
2nd place, silver medalist(s)		Antonio Marques; Cristina Goncalves; Fernando Ferreira; Joao Paulo Fernandes	Portugal
3rd place, bronze medalist(s)		Jose Vaquerizo; Manuel Angel Martin; Pedro Cordero; Francisco Javier Beltran	Spain

The Boccia Team BC1-2 event at the 2008 Summer Paralympics was held in the Olympic Green Convention Center on 10–12 September. The preliminary stages consisted of 4 round-robin groups of 3 competitors each. The top two teams in each group qualified for the final stages. The event was won by the team representing Great Britain.

== Results ==
=== Preliminaries ===
==== Pool A ====
Rank	Team	MP	W	L	Points	GBR	ARG	CAN
1	Great Britain	2	2	0	13:10	x	6:4	7:6*
2	Argentina	2	1	1	10:8	4:6	x	6:2
3	Canada	2	0	2	8:13	6:7*	2:6	x

- after an extra (fifth) end.

==== Pool B ====
Rank	Team	MP	W	L	Points	POR	NOR	JPN
1	Portugal	2	2	0	26:5	x	19:1	7:4
2	Norway	2	1	1	8:23	1:19	x	7:4
3	Japan	2	0	2	8:14	4:7	4:7	x

==== Pool C ====
Rank	Team	MP	W	L	Points	ESP	IRL	FIN
1	Spain	2	2	0	28:2	x	12:1	16:1
2	Ireland	2	1	1	8:15	1:12	x	7:3
3	Finland	2	0	2	4:23	1:16	3:7	x

==== Pool D ====
Rank	Team	MP	W	L	Points	CHN	HKG	NZL
1	China	2	2	0	15:7	x	7:3	8:4
2	Hong Kong	2	1	1	11:9	3:7	x	8:2
3	New Zealand	2	0	2	6:16	4:8	2:8	x

=== Competition bracket ===
Quarter-finals
Great Britain	11
Norway	1
China	12
Ireland	2
Portugal	8
Argentina	3
Spain	8
Hong Kong	4

Semi-finals
Great Britain	7
China	3
Portugal	8
Spain	2

Final
Great Britain	8
Portugal	4
Third place
China	4
Spain	5

== Entry list ==
Great Britain Dan Bentley; Nigel Murray; Zoe Robinson; David Smith	Argentina Gabriela Villano; Roberto Leglice; Mauricio Ibarbure; Pablo Cortez	Canada Adam Dukovich; Hanif Mawji; Tammy Lee McLeod; Brock Richardson	Portugal Antonio Marques; Cristina Goncalves; Fernando Ferreira; Joao Paulo Fernandes
Norway Roger Aandalen; John Norsterud; Elisabeth Wilhelmsen	Japan Keizo Uchida; Takayuki Kitani; Risa Kainuma; Takayuki Hirose	Spain Jose Vaquerizo; Manuel Angel Martin; Pedro Cordero; Francisco Javier Beltran	Ireland Gabriel Shelly; Padraic Moran; Tom Leahy; Roberta Connolly
Finland Vesa Koivuniemi; Timo Ollikka; Leena Sarela	New Zealand Maurice Toon; Liam Sanders; Jeremy Morriss; Keri Bonner	Hong Kong Wong Wing Hong; Loung John; Mei Yee Leung; Hoi Ying Karen Kwok	China Cao Fei; Wang Yi; Zhiqiang Yan; Qi Zhang
