= Boccia at the 2004 Summer Paralympics – Individual BC3 =

Boccia - Mixed Individual BC3 at the XII Paralympic Games
- Paralympic Boccia
- Venue: Ano Liosia Olympic Hall
- Dates: 23–26 September 2004
- Competitors: 18 from 9 nations

Medalists
1st place, gold medalist(s)		Paul Gauthier	Canada
2nd place, silver medalist(s)		Santiago Pesquera	Spain
3rd place, bronze medalist(s)		An Myung Hoon	South Korea

The Mixed Individual BC3 boccia competition at the 2004 Summer Paralympics was held from 23 to 26 September at the Ano Liosia Olympic Hall.

The event was won by Paul Gauthier, representing Canada.

== Results ==
=== Preliminaries ===
==== Pool L ====
Rank	Competitor	MP	W	L	Points	ESP	CAN	CZE	IRL
1	Santiago Pesquera (ESP)	3	3	0	17:3	x	3:2	6:0	8:1
2	Alison Kabush (CAN)	3	2	1	17:7	2:3	x	9:0	6:4
3	Radovan Krenek (CZE)	3	1	2	3:17	0:6	0:9	x	3:2
4	Gerry O'Grady (IRL)	3	0	3	7:17	1:8	4:6	2:3	x

==== Pool M ====
Rank	Competitor	MP	W	L	Points	CAN	ESP	NZL	KOR
1	Paul Gauthier (CAN)	3	2	1	14:11	x	3:5	5:3	6:3
2	José Manuel Rodríguez (ESP)	3	2	1	13:14	5:3	x	4:3	4:8
3	Greig Jackson (NZL)	3	1	2	12:12	3:5	3:4	x	6:3
4	Park Seong Hyeon (KOR)	3	1	2	14:16	3:6	8:4	3:6	x

==== Pool N ====
Rank	Competitor	MP	W	L	Points	USA	GRE	POR	IRL	CZE
1	Austin Hanson (USA)	4	3	1	18:8	x	2:3	4:2	5:2	7:1
2	Grigorios Polychronidis (GRE)	4	3	1	18:10	3:2	x	7:2	4:1	4:5
3	Jose Carlos Macedo (POR)	4	2	2	21:14	2:4	2:7	x	7:3	10:0
4	John Cronin (IRL)	4	1	3	20:16	2:5	1:4	3:7	x	14:0
5	Ales Bidlas (CZE)	4	1	3	6:35	1:7	5:4	0:10	0:14	x

==== Pool O ====
Rank	Competitor	MP	W	L	Points	POR	KOR	NZL	ESP	USA
1	Armando Costa (POR)	4	4	0	29:11	x	6:5	7:3	5:2	11:1
2	An Myung Hoon (KOR)	4	2	2	29:13	5:6	x	11:2	2:4	11:1
3	Henk Dijkstra (NZL)	4	2	2	18:20	3:7	2:11	x	7:1	6:1
4	Yolanda Martin (ESP)	4	1	3	10:18	2:5	4:2	1:7	x	3:4
5	Samuel Williams (USA)	4	1	3	7:31	1:11	1:11	1:6	4:3	x

=== Competition bracket ===
Quarterfinals
Santiago Pesquera (ESP)	5
José Manuel Rodríguez (ESP)	0
Armando Costa (POR)	6
Grigorios Polychronidis (GRE)	1
Paul Gauthier (CAN)	5
Alison Kabush (CAN)	1
Austin Hanson (USA)	2
An Myung Hoon (KOR)	11

Semifinals
Santiago Pesquera (ESP)	4
Armando Costa (POR)	2
Paul Gauthier (CAN)	3
An Myung Hoon (KOR)	1

Finals
Santiago Pesquera (ESP)	1
Paul Gauthier (CAN)	7
Third place
Armando Costa (POR)	4
An Myung Hoon (KOR)	7
