= Boccia at the 2004 Summer Paralympics – Pairs BC3 =

Boccia - Mixed Pairs BC3 at the XII Paralympic Games
- Paralympic Boccia
- Venue: Ano Liosia Olympic Hall
- Dates: 26–28 September 2004
- Competitors: 8 from 8 nations

Medalists
1st place, gold medalist(s)		Park Seong Hyeon; An Myung Hoon	South Korea
2nd place, silver medalist(s)		Santiago Pesquera; José Manuel Rodríguez	Spain
3rd place, bronze medalist(s)		Paul Gauthier; Alison Kabush	Canada

The Mixed Pairs BC3 boccia competition at the 2004 Summer Paralympics was held from 26 to 28 September at the Ano Liosia Olympic Hall.

The event was won by Park Seong Hyeon and An Myung Hoon, representing South Korea.

== Results ==
=== Preliminaries ===
==== Pool U ====
Rank	Competitor	MP	W	L	Points	ESP	NZL	IRL	CZE
1	Santiago Pesquera (ESP); José Manuel Rodríguez (ESP)	3	3	0	14:9	x	5:4	3:1	6:4
2	Greig Jackson (NZL); Henk Dijkstra (NZL)	3	2	1	24:9	4:5	x	10:0	10:4
3	John Cronin (IRL); Gerry O'Grady (IRL)	3	1	2	6:16	1:3	0:10	x	5:3
4	Ales Bidlas (CZE); Radovan Krenek (CZE)	3	0	3	11:21	4:6	4:10	3:5	x

==== Pool V ====
Rank	Competitor	MP	W	L	Points	KOR	CAN	POR	USA
1	Park Seong Hyeon (KOR); An Myung Hoon (KOR)	3	3	0	29:4	x	7:1	11:2	11:1
2	Paul Gauthier (CAN); Alison Kabush (CAN)	3	2	1	11:10	1:7	x	4:3	6:0
3	Jose Carlos Macedo (POR); Armando Costa (POR)	3	1	2	14:16	2:11	3:4	x	9:1
4	Austin Hanson (USA); Samuel Williams (USA)	3	0	3	2:26	1:11	0:6	1:9	x

=== Competition bracket ===
Semi-finals
Santiago Pesquera (ESP); José Manuel Rodríguez (ESP)	6
Paul Gauthier (CAN); Alison Kabush (CAN)	0
Park Seong Hyeon (KOR); An Myung Hoon (KOR)	13
Greig Jackson (NZL); Henk Dijkstra (NZL)	0

Final
Santiago Pesquera (ESP); José Manuel Rodríguez (ESP)	1
Park Seong Hyeon (KOR); An Myung Hoon (KOR)	4
Third place
Paul Gauthier (CAN); Alison Kabush (CAN)	4
Greig Jackson (NZL); Henk Dijkstra (NZL)	3
