= Boccia at the 2008 Summer Paralympics – Individual BC2 =

Individual BC2 at the XIII Paralympic Games
- Paralympic Boccia
- Venue: Olympic Green Convention Center
- Dates: 7–9 September 2008
- Competitors: 28 from 12 nations

Medalists
1st place, gold medalist(s)		Kwok Hoi Ying Karen	Hong Kong
2nd place, silver medalist(s)		Nigel Murray	Great Britain
3rd place, bronze medalist(s)		Manuel Angel Martin	Spain

The Boccia Individual BC2 event at the 2008 Summer Paralympics was held in the Olympic Green Convention Center on 7–9 September. The preliminary stages consisted of 7 round-robin groups of 4 competitors each. The winner of each group plus the best second place player qualified for the final stages. The event was won by Kwok Hoi Ying Karen, representing Hong Kong.

== Results ==
- indicates matches in which an extra (fifth) end was played

=== Preliminaries ===
==== Pool A ====
Rank	Competitor	MP	W	L	Points	HKG	NZL	NZL	NOR
1	Kwok Hoi Ying Karen (HKG)	3	3	0	22:5	x	3:2	4:3	15:0
2	Jeremy Morriss (NZL)	3	2	1	21:8	2:3	x	9:4*	10:1
3	Maurice Toon (NZL)	3	1	2	28:13	3:4	4:9*	x	21:0
4	Elisabeth Wilhelmsen (NOR)	3	0	3	1:46	0:15	1:10	0:21	x

==== Pool B ====
Rank	Competitor	MP	W	L	Points	POR	GBR	JPN	IRL
1	Fernando Ferreira (POR)	3	2	1	16:8	x	6:1	8:2	2:5
2	Dan Bentley (GBR)	3	2	1	11:9	1:6	x	5:2	5:1
3	Risa Kainuma (JPN)	3	1	2	8:15	2:8	2:5	x	4:2
4	Tom Leahy (IRL)	3	1	2	8:11	5:2	1:5	2:4	x

==== Pool C ====
Rank	Competitor	MP	W	L	Points	GBR	JPN	HKG	NZL
1	Nigel Murray (GBR)	3	3	0	36:1	x	10:0	9:1	17:0
2	Takayuki Hirose (JPN)	3	2	1	12:14	0:10	x	4:3	8:1
3	Loung John (HKG)	3	1	2	8:14	1:9	3:4	x	4:1
4	Keri Bonner (NZL)	3	0	3	2:29	0:17	1:8	1:4	x

==== Pool D ====
Rank	Competitor	MP	W	L	Points	JPN	CAN	FIN	GBR
1	Keizo Uchida (JPN)	3	3	0	17:6	x	5:4	6:0	6:2
2	Adam Dukovich (CAN)	3	2	1	12:8	4:5	x	4:1	4:2
3	Timo Ollikka (FIN)	3	1	2	6:12	0:6	1:4	x	5:2
4	Zoe Robinson (GBR)	3	0	3	6:15	2:6	2:4	2:5	x

==== Pool E ====
Rank	Competitor	MP	W	L	Points	ESP	POR	NOR	HKG
1	Manuel Angel Martin (ESP)	3	3	0	22:3	x	4:2	10:0	8:1
2	Cristina Gonçalves (POR)	3	2	1	18:6	2:4	x	5:2	11:0
3	John Norsterud (NOR)	3	1	2	8:16	0:10	2:5	x	6:1
4	Wong Wing Hong (HKG)	3	0	3	2:25	1:8	0:11	1:6	x

==== Pool F ====
Rank	Competitor	MP	W	L	Points	ESP	CHN	CAN	FIN
1	Pedro Cordero (ESP)	3	3	0	30:0	x	6:0	9:0	15:0
2	Yan Zhiqiang (CHN)	3	2	1	13:8	0:6	x	5:1	8:1
3	Tammy Lee McLeod (CAN)	3	1	2	10:16	0:9	1:5	x	9:2
4	Vesa Koivuniemi (FIN)	3	0	3	3:32	0:15	1:8	2:9	x

==== Pool G ====
Rank	Competitor	MP	W	L	Points	ARG	CHN	IRL	ARG
1	Pablo Cortez (ARG)	3	3	0	17:5	x	5:2	4:1	8:2
2	Cao Fei (CHN)	3	2	1	11:7	2:5	x	5:0	4:2
3	Roberta Connolly (IRL)	3	1	2	5:12	1:4	0:5	x	4:3
4	Roberto Leglice (ARG)	3	0	3	7:16	2:8	2:4	3:4	x

=== Competition bracket ===
Quarter-finals
Kwok Hoi Ying Karen (HKG)	8
Cristina Gonçalves (POR)	1
Manuel Angel Martin (ESP)	3
Keizo Uchida (JPN)	1
Fernando Ferreira (POR)	2
Pablo Cortez (ARG)	5
Nigel Murray (GBR)	7
Pedro Cordero (ESP)	4

Semi-finals
Kwok Hoi Ying Karen (HKG)	4*
Manuel Angel Martin (ESP)	3*
Pablo Cortez (ARG)	1
Nigel Murray (GBR)	4

Final
Kwok Hoi Ying Karen (HKG)	5
Nigel Murray (GBR)	3
Third place
Manuel Angel Martin (ESP)	3
Pablo Cortez (ARG)	2
