= Boccia at the 2000 Summer Paralympics =

Boccia at the XI Paralympic Games
- Paralympic Boccia
- Competitors: 64 from 14 nations

Paralympic symbol (1994-2004)

Boccia at the 2000 Summer Paralympics consisted of individual, pairs, and team events. Men and women competed together.

== Medal table ==
Rank	Nation	Gold	Silver	Bronze	Total
1	Ireland (IRL)	2	0	0	2
2	Portugal (POR)	1	1	1	3
3	South Korea (KOR)	1	1	0	2
4	Great Britain (GBR)	1	0	0	1
5	Spain (ESP)	0	3	2	5
6	Canada (CAN)	0	0	2	2
Totals (6 entries)		5	5	5	15

=== Participating nations ===
- Argentina (6)
- Australia (6)
- Austria (4)
- Belgium (2)
- Canada (6)
- Czech Republic (2)
- Great Britain (4)
- Ireland (6)
- New Zealand (4)
- Norway (4)
- Portugal (6)
- South Korea (4)
- Spain (6)
- United States (4)

== Medal summary ==
Event	Gold	Silver	Bronze
Mixed individual BC1	Gabriel Shelly; Ireland	Antonio Cid; Spain	Francisco Beltran; Spain
Mixed individual BC2	Nigel Murray; Great Britain	Lee Jin-woo; South Korea	Jesus Fraile; Spain
Mixed individual BC3	José Macedo; Portugal	Armando Costa; Portugal	Paul Gauthier; Canada
Mixed pairs BC3	Ireland (IRL); Margaret Grant; John Cronin	Spain (ESP); Yolanda Martin; Santiago Pesquera	Canada (CAN); Alison Kabush; Paul Gauthier
Mixed team BC1-BC2	South Korea (KOR); Goo Keun-hoo; Kim Hae-ryung; Lee Jin-woo; Lee Jung-ho	Spain (ESP); Jesus Fraile; Alvaro Galan; Francisco Beltran; Antonio Cid	Portugal (POR); Luis Belchior; António Marques; Fernando Ferreira; Pedro Silva
