= José Rodríguez Vázquez =

José Rodríguez Vázquez may refer to:

- José Manuel Rodríguez (boccia) (born 1980), Spanish boccia player
- Pepe Rodríguez (1889–1972), Spanish football player and manager
