= João Paulo Fernandes =

João Paulo Fernandes may refer to:

- João Paulo Fernandes (boccia)
- João Paulo Fernandes (footballer)
