= Noelia García Martin =

Spanish swimmer

Noelia García
Personal information
- Full name: Noelia García Martin
- Nationality: Spain
- Born: 20 April 1973 (age 53) Plasencia, Cáceres

Sport
- Sport: Swimming
Medal record
Women's swimming
Representing Spain
Paralympic Games
| Silver medal – second place | 2004 Athens | 4x50m medley relay 20pts |

Noelia Garcia Martin (born 20 April 1973 in Plasencia, Cáceres) is an S6 swimmer from Spain. Her physical disability is the result of a problem with doctors and a blood clot that occurred in her bone after she had surgery on her knee. She competed at the 2004 Summer Paralympics, winning a silver in the 4 x 50 meter medley relay 20 points race.
