= Álvaro Galán Floria =

Spanish boccia player

Personal information
- Nationality: Spanish

Sport
- Country: Spain
- Sport: Boccia
Medal record
Boccia
Representing Spain
Paralympic Games

Alvaro Galan Floria (born January 28, 1977, in Madrid) is a boccia player from Spain. He has a physical disability: He has cerebral palsy and is a BC2 type athlete. He competed at the 2000 Summer Paralympics. He was on the BC1/BC2 team from Spain. His team finished second. In the first - second finish game, South Korea finished first by a score of 7–6.
