= Jesús Fraile Moreno =

Spanish boccia player

Jesús Fraile
Personal information
- Full name: Jesús Fraile Moreno
- Nationality: Spanish
- Born: 8 June 1964 (age 62) Toledo, Spain

Sport
- Country: Spain
- Sport: Boccia

Jesús Fraile Moreno (born 8 June 1964 in Toledo) is a boccia player from Spain. He has a physical disability: He has cerebral palsy and is a BC2 type athlete. He competed at the 1996 Summer Paralympics. He finished first in the BC1/BC2 team event and he finished third in the BC2 one person event. He competed at the 2000 Summer Paralympics. He finished third in the BC2 one person event. He finished second in the BC1/BC2 team event
