= Josh Vander Vies =

Canadian lawyer and Paralympic athlete

Josh Vander Vies (born December 28, 1984) is a Canadian lawyer and former Paralympic athlete. He won a bronze medal for doubles boccia at the 2012 Summer Paralympics in London before retiring.

== Early life ==
Vander Vies was born on December 28, 1984, in Sarnia, Ontario to parents Gary and Sandy. He was born without fully formed arms or legs. He is a graduate of High Park French Immersion School and Northern Collegiate Institute. He earned a diploma in general arts and science from Lambton College before enrolling at the University of Western Ontario.

== Career ==
Vander Vies made his international debut in Boccia at the 2003 World Cup in Christchurch, New Zealand. Following this, he qualified for the 2004 Summer Paralympics in Athens but failed to medal in his debut. He was then elected to the International Boccia Committee as an Athlete Representative and competed at the 2006 Boccia World Championships. As a law student at the University of British Columbia, Vander Vies also competed internationally at the 2010 World Championship and 2011 World Cup. In 2010, he was appointed one of 25 torch bearers prior to the 2010 Winter Paralympics.

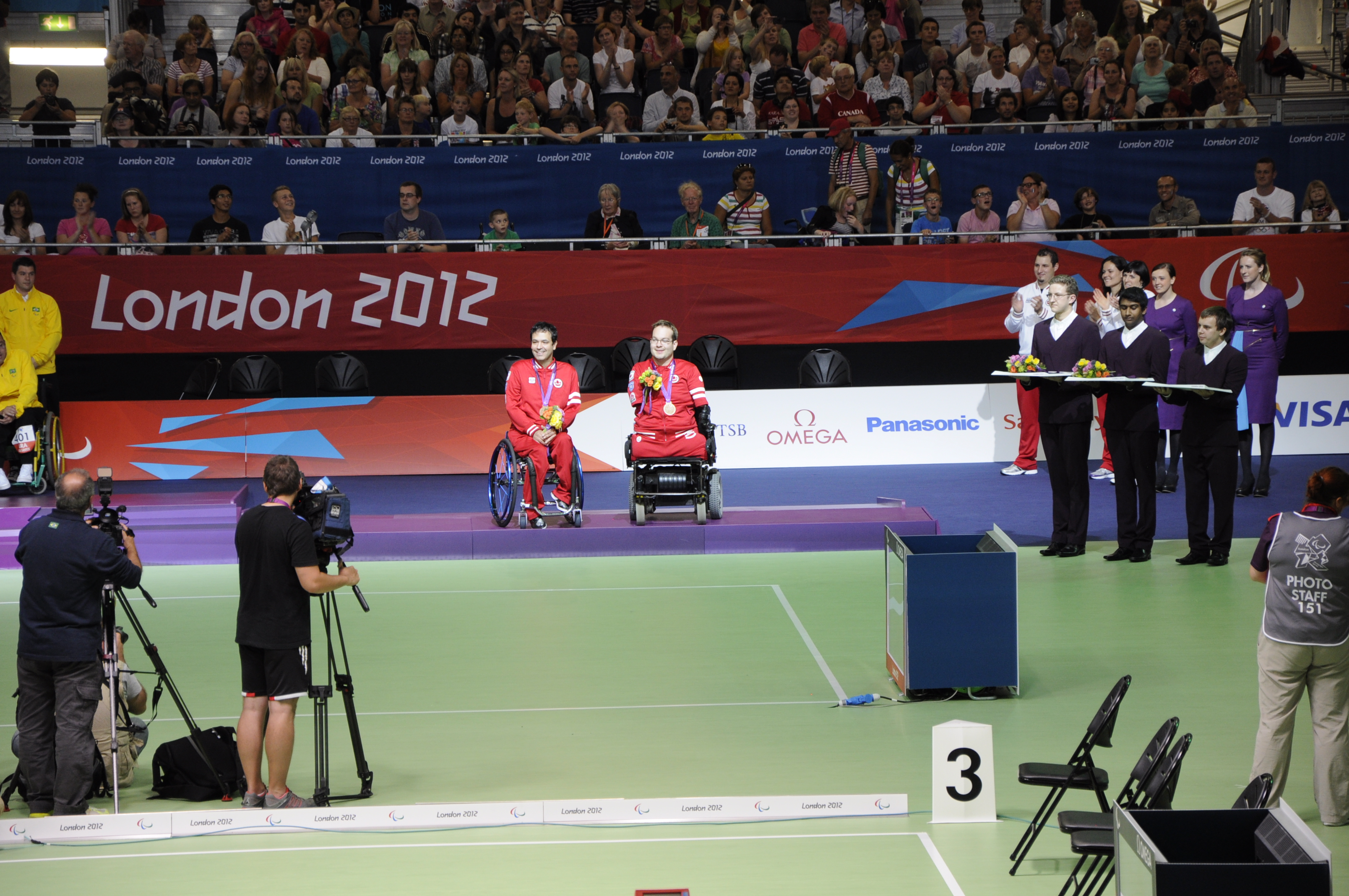
Marco Dispaltro and Vander Vies with their bronze medals

After failing to qualify for the 2008 Summer Paralympics, Vander Vies returned to the Paralympics in 2012 for doubles boccia. He played boccia Mixed Pairs-BC4 alongside Marco Dispaltro and won a bronze medal against Great Britain by a score of 8–2. Following the Games, Vander Vies retired from the sport but remained president of Athletes CAN, the association of Canada's national team athletes.

In 2020, Vander Vies was named Canada's assistant chef de mission during the 2020 Summer Paralympics. The following year, he announced he was running for the Liberal Party in the riding of Vancouver East at the next federal election. The election was held on September 20, 2021; Vander Vies came second to incumbent New Democratic Party MP Jenny Kwan.
