= José Javier Curto Gines =

Spanish boccia player (born 1964)

José Javier Curto
Personal information
- Full name: José Javier Curto Gines
- Nationality: Spanish
- Born: 31 December 1964 (age 61) Madrid, Spain

Sport
- Country: Spain
- Sport: Boccia

José Javier Curto Gines (born 31 December 1964 in Madrid) is a boccia player from Spain. He has a physical disability: He has cerebral palsy and is a BC2 type athlete. He competed at the 2004 Summer Paralympics. He finished first in the one person BC2 boccia game.
