= Roger Aandalen =

Norwegian boccia player (born 1965)

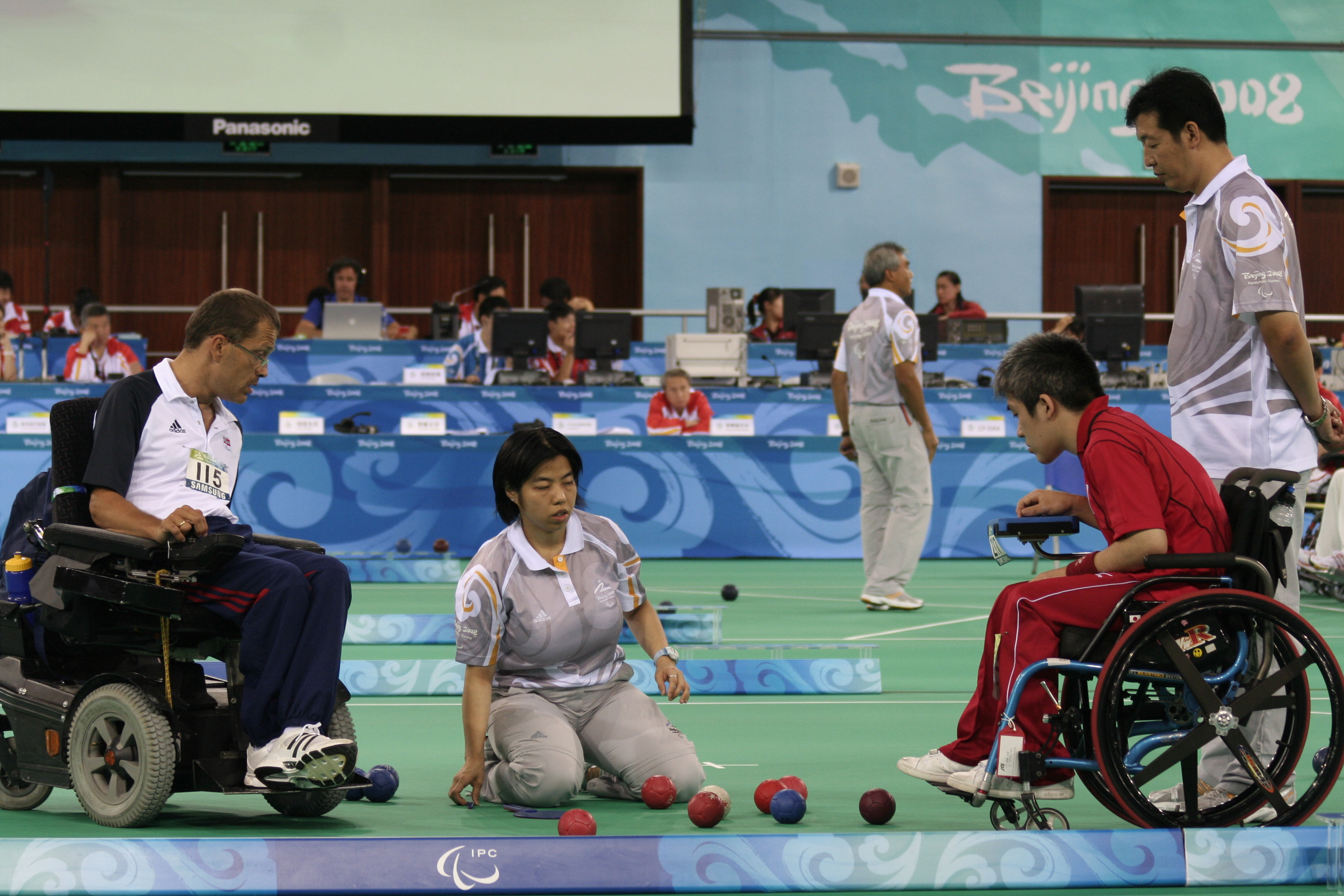
- Roger Aandalen (left) in a boccia match vs Japan at the 2008 Paralympics in Beijing

Personal information
- Nationality: Norway
- Born: 8 June 1965 (age 61)

Sport
- Sport: Boccia
- Club: Oslo handicapidrettslag

Achievements and titles
- Paralympic finals: 2004 Summer Paralympics: Individual BC1 – Silver; 2012 Summer Paralympics: Individual BC1 – Bronze
Medal record
Boccia
Representing Norway
Paralympic Games
Silver medal – second place	2004 Athens	Individual BC1
Bronze medal – third place	2012 London	Individual BC1

Roger Aandalen (born 8 June 1965) is a Norwegian boccia player.

He won a silver medal at the 2004 Summer Paralympics, as well as a bronze medal at the 2012 Summer Paralympics He has competed at the Paralympic Games in Atlanta 1996, Sydney 2000, Athens 2004, Beijing 2008, and London 2012.

He has cerebral palsy.
