= Tammy McLeod =

Canadian boccia player (born 1977)

Personal information
- Born: February 15, 1977 (age 49)
- Home town: London, Ontario, Canada

Sport
- Sport: Boccia
- Disability class: BC2
- Club: London Cannonballs Boccia Club
Medal record
Boccia
Representing Canada
Parapan American Games
Bronze medal – third place	2015	Team BC1/BC2

Tammy McLeod (born February 15, 1977) is a Canadian boccia player who has competed at four Paralympic Games. She won bronze in team BC1/BC2 boccia at the 2015 Parapan American Games.

== Career ==
McLeod has played boccia since she was a teenager and has competed at the Sydney 2000, Athens 2004, Beijing 2008, and London 2012 Paralympics. At the 2012 Summer Paralympics, McLeod's team, composed of her, Adam Dukovich, Brock Richardson, and Dave Richer, lost both their preliminary round games in mixed BC1/BC2 boccia team and did not advance beyond the group stage.

McLeod competed at the 2015 Parapan American Games. She won bronze in team BC1/BC2 boccia on a team with Dukovich, Hanif Mawji, and Chris Helpen.

In 2023, McLeod was given the Ontario Cerebral Palsy Sports Association (OCPSA) Athlete Lifetime Achievement Award.

== Personal life ==
McLeod has cerebral palsy and a speech impediment. Her 2015 Parapan American Games medal was stolen from her apartment after the Games in 2015. She was given a replacement medal by the Canadian Paralympic Committee.
