= Ross Flood (boccia) =

New Zealand Paralympian

Personal information
- Born: 22 February 1952 (age 74)

Sport
- Country: New Zealand
- Sport: Boccia
Medal record
Boccia
Representing New Zealand
Paralympic Games
Silver medal – second place	2004 Sydney	Mixed team BC1–BC2

Ross Flood (born 22 February 1952) is a New Zealand Paralympic boccia player. He was a bronze medallist at the 2004 Summer Paralympics. He also competed at the 2000 Summer Paralympics.
