= Pedro Cordero (boccia) =

Spanish boccia player (born 1972)

Personal information
- Full name: Pedro Cordero Martín
- Nationality: Spanish
- Born: 28 January 1972 (age 54) Badalona, Spain

Sport
- Country: Spain
- Sport: Boccia
- Disability class: BC2
Medal record
Boccia
Representing Spain
Paralympic Games
Bronze medal – third place	2004 Athens	Team BC1–2
Bronze medal – third place	2008 Beijing	Team BC1–2
World Championships
Bronze medal – third place	2010	Team BC1–2
World Cup
Silver medal – second place	2003	Team BC1–2
Bronze medal – third place	2003	Individual BC2
Silver medal – second place	2007	Team BC1–2

Pedro Cordero Martín (born 28 January 1972) is a Spanish boccia player. He represented Spain at the 2004, 2008 and 2012 Summer Paralympics, winning a bronze medal at both the 2004 and 2008 games in the BC1-BC2 boccia team event.

== Personal ==
Cordero was born 28 January 1972 in Badalona, Province of Barcelona, and in 2012 was living in the nearby town of Olesa de Montserrat. He has cerebral palsy. Before he concentrated on boccia, he participated in athletics and cycling. As of 2012, he was working as an office automation consultant, and is the athlete representative on the Catalan Sports Federation of Cerebral Palsy.

== Boccia ==
Cordero is classed as a BC2 boccia competitor, a category for players with cerebral palsy who are able to throw the ball without assistance. His first major international medal came at the 2003 World Cup in New Zealand: he won bronze as an individual and silver as part of the Spain team. At the 2004 Paralympics, he reached the semifinal of the individual BC2 class, losing the bronze medal match to his Portuguese opponent, and as a member of the Spanish team, won a bronze medal in the team BC1-BC2 event.

He was a member of the Spain teams that won bronze at the 2005 European Championships and silver at the 2007 World Cup. From 2008, Cordero received funding under the Plan ADOP scheme designed to provide financial support for Paralympic competitors. At the 2008 Paralympics in Beijing, he was a member of Spain's BC1-BC2 team that again finished third, and reached the quarter final in his individual event.

He won team bronze at the 2009 European Championships and at the 2010 World Championships. At the Spanish Boccia Club Championship in Elche in June 2011, Cordero, representing the CE Llars club, won the BC2 individual competition. In August, he was a member of the eleven-strong Spain squad for the 2011 World Cup in August, an event that contributed ranking points towards qualification for the London Paralympic Games; he came ninth in his individual event.

Buildup to the 2012 Paralympics in London continued with a January 2012 training camp for 25 athletes and coaches, jointly organized by the Spanish Federation of Sportspeople with Cerebral Palsy (FEDPC) and the Spanish Sports Federation for Persons with Physical Disabilities (FEDDF). He was again victorious in the BC2 national championships in 2012, a title he had won several times previously. In his individual event at the London Games, Cordero lost 1–9 in the round of sixteen to Brazilian Maciel Sousa Santos, and in the team event, Spain failed to progress past the preliminaries.

Cordero had joined the Infinits Somriures club by the start of the 2013–14 season, when he and Manolo Martín were equal on points at the top of the Spanish national rankings in the BC2 classification. Both were members of the Spanish team at the European Championships contested in June 2013 in Guimaraes, Portugal. Martín won the bronze medal, Cordero was eliminated at the group stage.
