= Fernando Ferreira (boccia) =

Portuguese boccia player (born 1971)

Personal information
- National team: Portugal
- Born: 23 September 1971 (age 54) Ferreira de Aves, Sátão, Portugal

Sport
- Country: Portugal
- Sport: Boccia
- Disability: Cerebral palsy
- Disability class: BC2
Medal record
Boccia
Representing Portugal
Paralympic Games
| Gold medal – first place | 2004 Athens | Team BC1-2 |
| Silver medal – second place | 1992 Barcelona | Mixed Individual C2 |
| Silver medal – second place | 1996 Atlanta | Mixed team C1–2 |
| Silver medal – second place | 2008 Beijing | Team BC1-2 |
| Bronze medal – third place | 1988 Seoul | Mixed Individual C2 |
| Bronze medal – third place | 2000 Sydney | Team BC1–BC2 |
| Bronze medal – third place | 2004 Athens | Individual BC2 |
| Bronze medal – third place | 2016 Rio de Janeiro | Team BC1-2 |
- Updated on 25 November 2017

Fernando Manuel da Costa Ferreira (born 23 September 1971) is a Portuguese boccia player. He has competed for his country and won medals at several Summer Paralympics.

== Career ==
Ferreira won a bronze medal at the 1988 Summer Paralympics, a silver at the 1992 Summer Paralympics, both in the mixed individual C2 event. He then won a silver medal at the 1996 Summer Paralympics in the Team C1-C2 event, and a bronze at the 2000 Summer Paralympics in the mixed team event.

Ferreira competed in the 2004 Summer Paralympics in Athens, Greece. There he won a bronze medal in the BC2 event and gold medal as part of the team BC1-2 competition with a victory over New Zealand. He continued to compete at successive Paralympic Games, where he won a silver medal in the team event at the 2008 Summer Paralympics in Beijing, China, but failed to win a medal at the 2012 Games in London, England.

At the 2016 Summer Paralympics, his last, Ferreira was named on the mixed boccia team once again. They qualified out of the group stage following a loss to Argentina followed by victories over Slovakia and Brazil. They were beaten 8–5 by Japan in the semi-final, resulting in a rematch against Argentina in the bronze medal match. Despite the earlier 1–7 loss, they defeated Argentina 6–2 to win the bronze medal.
