= Nigel Murray =

British Paralympic athlete (born 1964)

Medal record

Boccia

Representing Great Britain

Paralympic Games
Gold medal – first place	2000 Sydney	Individual BC2
Gold medal – first place	2008 Beijing	Team BC1-2
Silver medal – second place	2008 Beijing	Individual BC2
Bronze medal – third place	2012 London	Team BC1-2

World Championships
Gold medal – first place	2002 Portugal	Individual BC2
Gold medal – first place	2002 Portugal	Team BC1-2
Silver medal – second place	2010 Portugal	Individual BC2
Bronze medal – third place	2006 Brazil	Individual BC2

Nigel Patrick Murray MBE (born 22 May 1964) is a British Paralympic athlete. He is twelve time English National Champion and seven time British Champion and multiple Paralympic medal winner in the sport of boccia.

Murray was born in Leamington Spa. He won gold in the BC2 class during the 2000 Summer Paralympics in Sydney, Australia. Although he only reached the quarter-finals in Athens four years later he followed this up with a silver medal in the same event, and a gold medal in the team event, during the 2008 Summer Paralympics in Beijing, China.

Since Beijing Murray has continued to win medals with a bronze in the European championship individual event in 2009 and a silver at the World championship a year later. He was part of the team that took gold at the 2009 Euros. He then took part in the 2012 Paralympics, winning Bronze in the Team BC1–2 event.

Murray was appointed Member of the Order of the British Empire (MBE) in the 2013 New Year Honours for services to boccia.

The current world number 16, Murray lives in Royal Leamington Spa, Warwickshire, and is a fan of Leamington F.C.
