= Alison Kabush =

Canadian boccia player

Personal information
- Born: August 2, 1980 (age 46) Vancouver, British Columbia, Canada

Sport
- Country: Canada
- Sport: Boccia
- Disability class: BC3
Medal record
Boccia
Representing Canada
Paralympic Games
Bronze medal – third place	2000 Sydney	Pair BC3
Bronze medal – third place	2004 Athens	Pair BC3

Alison Kabush (born August 2, 1980) is a Canadian boccia player. She's won two bronze medals at the 2000 Paralympic Games and 2004 Paralympic Games.

== Career ==
Kabush grew up in Surrey, British Columbia and began playing Boccia with the provincial team at the age of 13. She competed in her first Paralympics during the 2000 Paralympic Games, where she won a bronze medal. Kabush was later named to Team Canada's Paralympic team prior to the 2004 Paralympic Games and won a bronze medal with partner Paul Gauthier. In 2011, Kabush was selected to compete at the Boccia World Cup. She was inducted into the Canadian Cerebral Palsy Sports Association's Hall of Fame in 2019.
