= Yolanda Martín =

Spanish boccia player (born 1954)

Personal information
- Full name: Yolanda Martin Franco
- Nationality: Spanish
- Born: February 16, 1954 (age 72) Guipúzcoa, Spain

Sport
- Country: Spain
- Sport: Boccia

Yolanda Martin Franco (born February 16, 1954, in Guipúzcoa) is a boccia player from Spain. She has cerebral palsy and is a BC3 type athlete. She works as an administrator. She competed at the 1996 Summer Paralympics. She finished second in the BC1 one person event. She competed at the 2000 Summer Paralympics. She finished second in the two person BC3 event. She competed at the 2004 Summer Paralympics. She competed at the 2008 Summer Paralympics. She finished second in the two person BC3 event.
