= Bobbie Wygant =

American television news reporter and interviewer (1926–2024)

- Born: Roberta Frances Connolly; November 22, 1926; Lafayette, Indiana, U.S.
- Died: February 18, 2024 (aged 97); Fort Worth, Texas, U.S.
- Education: Purdue University
- Occupation: Reporter
- Years active: 1948–2024
- Spouse: Philip Warren Wygant (m. 1947; died 1986)
- Website: bobbiewygant.com

Roberta Frances Wygant (née Connolly; November 22, 1926 – February 18, 2024) was an American television news reporter, film critic, talk show host, and interviewer who worked for Fort Worth, Texas, television station KXAS-TV (originally known as WBAP-TV) for over 70 years. She was known for her filmed interviews with celebrities.

== Early years ==
The granddaughter of Mr. and Mrs. Robert E. Connolly, Wygant was born in Lafayette, Indiana. She described her ancestry as French, Irish, and Texan. She had two younger brothers, Gordon and Carl Connolly. Their mother died of cancer when Wygant was 16 years old. She remained a full-time student while caring for her mother during her extended illness, after which she maintained the home for her father and her brothers. Her mother's death discouraged her from pursuing a career as a physician, which she had originally intended.

A trip to the 1939 New York World's Fair sparked her interest in television as she visited an experimental TV studio and appeared in front of a camera. Wygant graduated from St. Francis High School and from Purdue University in 1947, majoring in media broadcasting as well as psychology. At Purdue, she was a member of Alpha Epsilon Rho, Alpha Xi Delta sorority, Gold Peppers, Purdue Playshop, and the WBAA staff.

== Career ==
Wygant started her journalism career working for WBAP-TV in 1948. Her hiring occurred two weeks before the station began broadcasting. She began as a writer, creating copy for "commercials, intros to shows, whatever needed to be written."

Wygant worked at KXAS-TV for decades.

Later, Wygant worked in front of cameras, helping hosts of programs. She gained her own talk program, Dateline, in 1960 after she filled in for a week when the original host was sick with the flu. She interviewed a variety of guests on it. This made her the first woman in the southwestern United States to host a general-interest talk program.

Around 1975, after a change in station ownership, Wygant began working in the news department, particularly teaming with Chip Moody on Inside Area 5, which featured interviews and coverage of community activities. Beginning in 1977, she was co-host of the local component of The Jerry Lewis MDA Labor Day Telethon. Wygant was a founding member of the national Broadcast Film Critics Association.

=== Celebrity interviews ===
Over the course of her career in television, Wygant interviewed hundreds of celebrities. These included Farrah Fawcett, The Beatles, Madonna, Redd Foxx, Bob Hope, and Bette Davis. The interviews mainly focused on the celebrity's latest work, such as an actor's most recent film. In preparation for an interview, she said that she did the necessary research independently. Her interviewing style was praised by the likes of Stanley Kramer and Dustin Hoffman.

== Personal life ==
In June 1947, she married Philip Warren Wygant at age 20. They had met at Purdue when she worked at the radio station at which he was program supervisor. He died in April 1986 at age 60 due to liver disease. In addition to their professional activities, they operated a tree farm in east Texas. In early 2019, she published her autobiography, Talking to the Stars: Bobbie Wygant's Seventy Years in Television. Wygant was a Roman Catholic.

Wygant died on February 18, 2024, at the age of 97.

== Awards ==
Local and regional awards for Wygant included the Texas Arts Alliance's award for outstanding coverage of the arts in 1978. She was named the Zonta Club of Fort Worth's executive woman of the year in 1980.

Nationally, in 2000, the National Broadcast Film Critics Association presented Wygant with the Critic's Critic Award. She received the Emmy Gold Circle in 2004, honoring people with longevity in the television industry. In 2014, she won the Gracie Award for Outstanding Reporter/Correspondent from the Alliance for Women In Media.

Wygant started working only part-time in 2002, having worked full-time for over 50 years up until then. She was a recipient of Alpha Xi Delta's Woman of Distinction Award.
