= Francisco Beltrán =

Spanish boccia player (born 1972)

Personal information
- Full name: Francisco Javier Beltrán Manero
- Nationality: Spanish
- Born: November 5, 1972 (age 53) Madrid, Spain

Sport
- Country: Spain
- Sport: Boccia

Francisco Javier Beltrán Manero (born November 5, 1972, in Madrid) is a Spanish boccia player, who has represented the country internationally at the Paralympic Games.

== Personal ==
Beltran is from Madrid.

== Boccia ==
Beltran is a BC1 classified boccia player, and is a member of the A.D. Pacema club.

Lisbon hosted the World Championships in June 2010, and he was a member of the Spain national team. He took home a bronze in the team event. Elche, Spain hosted the Spanish Boccia Club Championship in June 2011, with Beltran participating in the event. He finished first in the BC1 competition.

The Boccia World Championships were held in August 2011, and Beltran participated. The event was part of the ranking process to qualify for the London Paralympic Games. He was eliminated in the individual competition in the group round following 1 win and 2 losses. In January 2012, he participated in a boccia training camp organized by the Spain's Cerebral Palsy Federation of Sports (FEDPC) and the Spanish Sports Federation for Persons with Physical Disabilities (FEDDF) along with 24 other boccia players from around Spain held at CRE San Andrés. The camp was part of national team preparations for the London Paralympics. He competed at the 2012 Summer Paralympics. In October 2013, he was ranked Spain's seventh best competitor in his classification.
