= Antonio Cid =

Spanish boccia player (born 1954)

Personal information
- Full name: Antonio Cid Cortés
- Nationality: Spanish
- Born: 16 February 1954 (age 72) Ourense, Spain

Sport
- Country: Spain
- Sport: Boccia
Medal record
Boccia
Representing Spain
Paralympic Games
Gold medal – first place	1992 Barcelona	Mixed individual C1
Gold medal – first place	1992 Barcelona	Mixed team C1–2
Gold medal – first place	1996 Atlanta	Mixed team C1–2
Silver medal – second place	2000 Sydney	Mixed individual BC1
Silver medal – second place	2000 Sydney	Mixed team BC1–2
Bronze medal – third place	2004 Athens	Mixed team BC1–2

Antonio Cid Cortés (Note: In this Spanish name, the first or paternal surname is Cid and the second or maternal family name is Cortés.) (born 16 February 1954 in Ourense) is a boccia player from Spain. He has a physical disability: he has cerebral palsy and is a BC1 type athlete. He competed at the 1996 Summer Paralympics. He finished first in the BC1/BC2 team event. He competed at the 2000 Summer Paralympics. He finished second in the BC1 one person event and in the BC1/BC2 team event. He competed at the 2004 Summer Paralympics.
