= Paul Gauthier (boccia) =

Canadian boccia player

Personal information
- Born: 25 November 1970 (age 55) Vancouver, British Columbia, Canada
- Home town: New Westminster, British Columbia, Canada

Sport
- Country: Canada
- Sport: Boccia
- Disability class: BC3
Medal record
Boccia
Representing Canada
Paralympic Games
Gold medal – first place	2004 Athens	Individual BC3
Bronze medal – third place	2000 Sydney	Individual BC3
Bronze medal – third place	2000 Sydney	Mixed pair BC3
Bronze medal – third place	2004 Athens	Mixed pair BC3
Parapan American Games
Gold medal – first place	2011 Guadalajara	Individual BC3
Gold medal – first place	2015 Toronto	Mixed pair BC3

Paul Gauthier (born 25 November 1970) is a Canadian retired boccia player who competed in international elite competitions. He was the first Canadian Paralympic champion in boccia when he won the individual BC3 and won two bronze medals with Alison Kabush in the mixed pairs.
