= Jeremy Morriss =

New Zealand Paralympian

Sport
- Country: New Zealand
- Sport: Boccia
Medal record
Boccia
Representing New Zealand
Paralympic Games
Silver medal – second place	2004 Athens	Mixed team BC1–BC2

Jeremy Morriss is a New Zealand Paralympic boccia player. He was a silver medallist at the 2004 Summer Paralympics. He also competed at the 2008 Summer Paralympics.
