= Maurice Toon =

New Zealand Paralympic boccia player

Medal record

Boccia

Representing New Zealand

Paralympic Games
Silver medal – second place	2004 Sydney	Mixed team - BC1/BC2

Maurice Toon is a paralympic boccia player from New Zealand competing mainly in category BC2 events.

Maurice competed in both the 2004 and 2008 Summer Paralympics. At the 2004 games he competed in the individual event finishing first in his group but then lost in the quarter-finals to Portugal's Fernando Ferreira, he was also a part of the New Zealand team that won a silver medal in the mixed team event. At the 2008 games he finished third in his group in the individual event missing out on qualifying for the quarter-finals and was part of the New Zealand team that finished last in there group.
