= José Manuel Rodríguez (boccia) =

Spanish boccia player (born 1980)

Personal information
- Full name: José Manuel Rodríguez Vázquez
- Nationality: Spanish
- Born: 2 September 1980 (age 45) Cádiz, Spain

Sport
- Country: Spain
- Sport: Boccia

José Manuel Rodríguez Vázquez (Note: In this Spanish name, the first or paternal surname is Rodriguez and the second or maternal family name is Vazquez.) (born 2 September 1980) is a Spanish boccia player, who has represented the country internationally at the Paralympic Games. Vazquez won a gold medal in the 2004 Summer Paralympics in Athens.

== Personal ==
Rodríguez is from Cádiz. He was born on 3 September 1980. He became a player from Spain. He has a physical disability: He has cerebral palsy and is a BC3 type athlete skilled at boccia. He competed at the 2004 Summer Paralympics and the 2008 Summer Paralympics in the two person game and finished second. He also competed at the 2012 Summer Paralympics.

== Boccia ==
Rodriguez is a member of the Adupace Jerez club.

At the Lisbon-hosted World Championships in June 2010, Rodríguez was a member of the Spain national team in the BC3 team event. They finished fifth. Elche, Spain hosted the Spanish Boccia Club Championship in June 2011, with Rodriguez participating in the event. He finished third in the BC3 individual event.

Belfast in Northern Ireland hosted Boccia World Championships in August 2011, and he participated. The event was part of the ranking process to qualify for the London Paralympic Games. He made the quarterfinals but was eliminated by the eventual winner. In January 2012, he was unable to attend a boccia training camp organized by Spain's Cerebral Palsy Federation of Sports (FEDPC) and the Spanish Sports Federation for Persons with Physical Disabilities (FEDDF) at CRE San Andrés. Club ADM and the Sociocultural Disability Association (ASCM) organized the June 2012 Spain national championships. Competing with teammate Diego Bejarano, they finished first in the BC3 pairs competition. He competed at the 2012 Summer Paralympics, where he lost 0–11 in the round of sixteen.

In October 2013, Rodríguez was ranked Spain's fourth best competitor in his classification.
