= João Paulo Fernandes (boccia) =

Portuguese boccia player

Personal information
- Full name: João Paulo dos Santos Fernandes
- Nationality: Portuguese
- Born: 11 August 1984 (age 41) Vale de Cambra

Sport
- Country: Portugal
- Sport: Boccia
- Event(s): Individual BC1; Team BC1/BC2
Medal record
Paralympic Games
Gold medal – first place	2004 Athens	Individual BC1
Gold medal – first place	2004 Athens	Team BC1/BC2
Gold medal – first place	2008 Beijing	Individual BC1
Silver medal – second place	2008 Beijing	Team BC1/BC2
World Championships
Silver medal – second place	2006 Rio	Team BC1/BC2
- Updated on 12 September 2008

João Paulo dos Santos Fernandes (Note: This name uses Portuguese naming customs: the first or maternal family name is Dos Santos and the second or paternal family name is Fernandes.) (born 11 August 1984) is a Portuguese boccia player and three-time Paralympic champion.

He took two gold medals at the 2004 Summer Paralympics in Athens, and one gold and one silver at the 2008 Summer Paralympics in Beijing.
