= Santiago Pesquera Blanco =

Spanish boccia player

Personal information
- Nationality: Spanish

Sport
- Country: Spain
- Sport: Boccia
Medal record
Boccia
Representing Spain
Paralympic Games

Santiago Pesquera Blanco (born April 21, 1973, in La Rioja) is a boccia player from Spain. He has had cerebral palsy since birth and is a BC3 type athlete. His job is working with computers. He started playing sport when he was 17 years old. He also plays wheelchair track and field.

He competed at the 1996 Summer Paralympics in boccia. He competed at the 2000 Summer Paralympics. He finished second in the BC3 two person event. He competed at the 2004 Summer Paralympics. He finished second in the BC3 two person event. He finished second in the BC3 one person event. He competed at the 2008 Summer Paralympics. He finished first in the BC3 one person event.

In April 2008, he was one of four Navarre sportspeople on the short list to attend the Beijing Paralympics.
