= Ireland at the Paralympics =

- IPC code: IRL
- NPC: Paralympics Ireland
- Website: www.paralympics.ie
- Medals Ranked 29th: Gold 71 Silver 71 Bronze 98 Total 240

Summer appearances
- 1960; 1964; 1968; 1972; 1976; 1980; 1984; 1988; 1992; 1996; 2000; 2004; 2008; 2012; 2016; 2020; 2024

A team representing Ireland has competed at every Summer Paralympic Games. The country has never taken part in the Winter Paralympics. Irish athletes have won 238 Summer Paralympic medals. Paralympics Ireland (formerly the Paralympic Council of Ireland) is the National Paralympic Committee.

Northern Ireland-born athletes are entitled to represent either Ireland or Great Britain and Northern Ireland, as they are automatically entitled to the citizenship of both countries. As a result, athletes will tend to represent the National Olympic Committee of the nation to which their sport federation is aligned. The smaller competition pool will also see athletes choose to represent Ireland to ensure greater Olympic qualification chances, although athletes may also move in the opposite direction to increase medal chances, especially in team events. A number of athletes have represented both nations. This is on the same basis as at the Olympics.

At the first Paralympic Games in 1960 in Rome Ireland were one of 23 nations to enter athletes. The team finished 12th in the medals table which to this day remains the highest Ireland has ranked on the medal table. Both of Ireland's gold medals were won by Joan Horan. Horan won her medals in two different sports, one in the women's St. Nicholas Round open archery and one in the women's 25 m Crawl complete class 2 swimming event. At the next games, hosted by Tokyo in 1964, two Irish athletes competed. This remains Ireland's only Summer Paralympics where no medals were earned.

The most medals won by Ireland at a Paralympic Games is 66. This was achieved at the 1984 Games hosted in New York and Stoke Mandeville. 20 of these medals were gold, 15 silver and 31 bronze. These are the most medals ever won at the games, making this the most successful Paralympic Games for Ireland. This was achieved with only 53 athletes on the Paralympic team that year.

The 1996 Summer Paralympics saw the biggest Paralympic team ever head to Atlanta. With 63 athletes competing in these games, Ireland was hoping for their biggest games yet. Disappointingly for the Irish, 10 medals were won at these games.

At the 2008 Summer Paralympics, held in Beijing, Ireland won five medals in total, three of them gold. There was controversy over the participation of Derek Malone in the 7-a-side cerebral palsy football tournament. Malone, who had competed in the 800 m event at the Athens Paralympics was ruled as ineligible to compete by Games classification authorities on the grounds that his disability was not severe enough.

Athletics is Ireland's highest achieving sport with more than 5x more medals won in Athletics than any other sport. Ireland have also been very successful in swimming with 31 medals won in the sport.

== Medal tables ==
=== Medals by Summer Games ===
Games	Athletes	Gold	Silver	Bronze	Total	Rank
(Italy) 1960 Rome	5	2	0	0	2	12
(Japan) 1964 Tokyo	2	0	0	0	0	18
(Israel) 1968 Tel-Aviv	7	0	4	5	9	19
(Germany) 1972 Heidelberg	17	2	4	2	8	21
(Canada) 1976 Toronto	19	4	10	6	20	21
(Netherlands) 1980 Arnhem	24	4	2	11	17	25
(United Kingdom) (United States) 1984 Stoke Mandeville/New York	53	20	15	31	66	14
(South Korea) 1988 Seoul	53	13	11	18	42	19
(Spain) 1992 Barcelona/Madrid	58	0	3	4	7	47
(United States) 1996 Atlanta	63	1	3	6	10	45
(Australia) 2000 Sydney	39	5	3	1	9	31
(Greece) 2004 Athens	42	0	3	1	4	61
(China) 2008 Beijing	45	3	1	1	5	36
(United Kingdom) 2012 London	49	8	3	5	16	19
(Brazil) 2016 Rio de Janeiro	44	4	4	3	11	28
(Japan) 2020 Tokyo	31	4	2	1	7	32
(France) 2024 Paris	35	1	3	2	6	55
(United States) 2028 Los Angeles	future events					
(Australia) 2032 Brisbane	future events					
Total		71	71	97	239	29

=== Medals by summer sport ===
Sport	Gold	Silver	Bronze	Total
Athletics	38	39	63	140
Swimming	11	11	9	31
Lawn bowls	7	2	3	12
Cycling	6	4	4	14
Table tennis	3	6	10	19
Boccia	3	1	3	7
Snooker	1	3	0	4
Equestrian	1	2	3	6
Archery	1	1	0	2
Football 7-a-side	0	1	2	3
Totals (10 entries)	71	70	97	238

== List of medallists ==
The following table contains all medals won by athletes representing Ireland in the Paralympics. All medals have been won at the Summer Games. Ireland have never had a Paralympic team compete in the Winter Games.

The table is organised in chronological order, then by medal type (Gold, silver and bronze) and then by sport.

=== Medallists (1960 - 1980) ===
Medal	Name	Games	Sport	Event
Gold	Joan Horan	1960 Rome	Archery	Women's St. Nicholas round open
Gold	Joan Horan	1960 Rome	Swimming	Women's 25m crawl complete class 2
Silver	Rosaleen Gallagher	1968 Tel-Aviv	Archery	Women's St. Nicholas round cervical
Silver	Jimmy Gibson	1968 Tel-Aviv	Snooker	Men's open
Silver	Frances O'Sullivan White	1968 Tel-Aviv	Swimming	Women's 25m backstroke class 1
Silver	Frances O'Sullivan White	1968 Tel-Aviv	Table Tennis	Women's A1 singles
Bronze	Rosaleen Gallagher	1968 Tel-Aviv	Athletics	Women's Slalom cervical class
Bronze	Rosaleen Gallagher	1968 Tel-Aviv	Swimming	Women's 25m backstroke class 1
Bronze	Rosaleen Gallagher	1968 Tel-Aviv	Table Tennis	Women's A2 singles
Bronze	Rosaleen Gallagher; Frances O'Sullivan White	1968 Tel-Aviv	Table Tennis	Women's A2 doubles
Bronze	Jimmy Gibson	1968 Tel-Aviv	Table Tennis	Men's C singles
Gold	Rosaleen Gallagher	1972 Heidelberg	Athletics	Women's 60m wheelchair 1B
Gold	Jimmy Gibson; Eddie Lucas	1972 Heidelberg	Lawn Bowls	Men's pairs
Silver	Kathleen Fagan	1972 Heidelberg	Athletics	Women's 60m m2
Silver	Rosaleen Gallagher	1972 Heidelberg	Athletics	Women's javelin 1B
Silver	Jimmy Gibson	1972 Heidelberg	Snooker	Men's tournament paraplegic
Silver	Ireland Team	1972 Heidelberg	Table Tennis	Women's Teams 2
Bronze	Kathleen Fagan	1972 Heidelberg	Athletics	Women's discus throw 2
Bronze	Frances O'Sullivan White	1972 Heidelberg	Swimming	Women's 25m backstroke 1B
Gold	Michael Cunningham	1976 Toronto	Athletics	Men's javelin 4
Gold	Rosaleen Gallagher	1976 Toronto	Athletics	Women's pentathlon 1B
Gold	Julia Cosgrove; Frances O'Sullivan White	1976 Toronto	Table Tennis	Women's doubles 1B
Gold	Julia Cosgrove	1976 Toronto	Table Tennis	Women's singles 1A
Silver	Patrick McCool	1976 Toronto	Athletics	Men's club throw
Silver	Patrick McCool	1976 Toronto	Athletics	Men's discus throw
Silver	Clause Stephens	1976 Toronto	Athletics	Men's discus throw 2
Silver	Rosaleen Gallagher	1976 Toronto	Athletics	Women's 60m 1B
Silver	Kathleen Fagan	1976 Toronto	Athletics	Women's 60m 2
Silver	Kathleen Fagan	1976 Toronto	Athletics	Women's discus throw 2
Silver	Rosaleen Gallagher	1976 Toronto	Athletics	Women's shot put 1B
Silver	Christine Doprill	1976 Toronto	Athletics	Women's shot put 2
Silver	Rosaleen Gallagher	1976 Toronto	Athletics	Women's Slalom 1B
Silver	Frances O'Sullivan White	1976 Toronto	Table Tennis	Women's singles 1B
Bronze	Clause Stephens	1976 Toronto	Athletics	Men's shot put 2
Bronze	Rosaleen Gallagher	1976 Toronto	Athletics	Women's club throw 1B
Bronze	Rosaleen Gallagher	1976 Toronto	Athletics	Women's discus throw 1B
Bronze	Christine Doprill	1976 Toronto	Athletics	Women's discus throw 2
Bronze	Christine Doprill	1976 Toronto	Athletics	Women's javelin 2
Bronze	Kathleen Fagan	1976 Toronto	Athletics	Women's slalom 2

=== Medallists (1984 - 2000) ===
Medal	Name	Games	Sport	Event
Gold	Ronan Tynan	1984 Stoke Mandeville / New York	Athletics	Long jump A3
Gold	David McNally	1984 Stoke Mandeville / New York	Athletics	Long jump C8
Gold	Brendan Crean	1984 Stoke Mandeville / New York	Athletics	Club throw C3
Gold	Ronan Tynan	1984 Stoke Mandeville / New York	Athletics	Discus throw A3
Gold	William Johnston	1984 Stoke Mandeville / New York	Athletics	Distance throw C1
Gold	Ronan Tynan	1984 Stoke Mandeville / New York	Athletics	Shot put A3
Gold	Tom Leahy	1984 Stoke Mandeville / New York	Athletics	Shot put C2
Gold	Dermot Walsh	1984 Stoke Mandeville / New York	Athletics	Slalom C2
Gold	Carol Carr	1984 Stoke Mandeville / New York	Athletics	400m B2
Gold	Morna Cloonan	1984 Stoke Mandeville / New York	Athletics	1000m Cross country C6
Gold	Cathy Dunne	1984 Stoke Mandeville / New York	Athletics	Discus throw 3
Gold	Rosaleen Galagher	1984 Stoke Mandeville / New York	Athletics	Shot put B1
Gold	Morna Cloonan	1984 Stoke Mandeville / New York	Athletics	Shot put C6
Gold	Gerard Dunne	1984 Stoke Mandeville / New York	Swimming	100m backstroke 6
Gold	Gerard Dunne	1984 Stoke Mandeville / New York	Swimming	100m butterfly 6
Gold	Morna Cloonan	1984 Stoke Mandeville / New York	Swimming	25m backstroke C6
Gold	Jimmy Gibson	1984 Stoke Mandeville / New York	Snooker	Men's paraplegic
Gold	Bill Ensor; Paul Smyth	1984 Stoke Mandeville / New York	Lawn Bowls	Men's pairs A2/4
Gold	Paul Smyth	1984 Stoke Mandeville / New York	Lawn Bowls	Men's singles A2/4
Gold	Alice Bailey; Angela Hendra	1984 Stoke Mandeville / New York	Lawn Bowls	Women's pairs paraplegic
Silver	Gerry O'Rourke	1984 Stoke Mandeville / New York	Athletics	400m A1–A3
Silver	Ronan Tynan	1984 Stoke Mandeville / New York	Athletics	High jump A3
Silver	William Johnston	1984 Stoke Mandeville / New York	Athletics	Precision throw C1
Silver	John Creedon	1984 Stoke Mandeville / New York	Athletics	Club throw L1
Silver	Tom Leahy	1984 Stoke Mandeville / New York	Athletics	Club throw C2
Silver	Theresa Ward	1984 Stoke Mandeville / New York	Athletics	200m C7
Silver	Carol Carr	1984 Stoke Mandeville / New York	Athletics	1500m B2
Silver	Kay McShane	1984 Stoke Mandeville / New York	Athletics	Marathon 4
Silver	Rosaleen Galagher	1984 Stoke Mandeville / New York	Athletics	Javelin B1
Silver	Theresa Ward	1984 Stoke Mandeville / New York	Athletics	Javelin C7
Silver	Morna Cloonan	1984 Stoke Mandeville / New York	Athletics	Club throw C6
Silver	Gerard Dunne	1984 Stoke Mandeville / New York	Swimming	400m freestyle 6
Silver	Monica O'Kelly	1984 Stoke Mandeville / New York	Swimming	25m freestyle with aids C2
Silver	Ireland men	1984 Stoke Mandeville / New York	Football	7-a-side CP
Silver	Ireland women	1984 Stoke Mandeville / New York	Table tennis	Teams 2
Bronze	Gerry O'Rourke	1984 Stoke Mandeville / New York	Athletics	100m A1–A3
Bronze	Gerry O'Rourke	1984 Stoke Mandeville / New York	Athletics	800m A1–A3
Bronze	Patrick Kelly	1984 Stoke Mandeville / New York	Athletics	800m B1
Bronze	Fintan O'Donnell	1984 Stoke Mandeville / New York	Athletics	800m B3
Bronze	Patrick Kelly	1984 Stoke Mandeville / New York	Athletics	1500m B1
Bronze	Ronan Rooney	1984 Stoke Mandeville / New York	Athletics	Marathon 1B
Bronze	Ireland men	1984 Stoke Mandeville / New York	Athletics	4x100m relay C7–C8
Bronze	Joe Mulhall	1984 Stoke Mandeville / New York	Athletics	Club throw C3
Bronze	Joe Mulhall	1984 Stoke Mandeville / New York	Athletics	Javelin C3
Bronze	Martin Costello	1984 Stoke Mandeville / New York	Athletics	Javelin C4
Bronze	John Twomey	1984 Stoke Mandeville / New York	Athletics	Discus throw 2
Bronze	Joe Mulhall	1984 Stoke Mandeville / New York	Athletics	Shot put C3
Bronze	Francis Genockey	1984 Stoke Mandeville / New York	Athletics	Shot put L2
Bronze	David Boland	1984 Stoke Mandeville / New York	Athletics	Medicine ball thrust C2
Bronze	Theresa Ward	1984 Stoke Mandeville / New York	Athletics	100m C7
Bronze	Rosaleen Galagher	1984 Stoke Mandeville / New York	Athletics	Slalom B1
Bronze	Alison Barnes	1984 Stoke Mandeville / New York	Athletics	Slalom C1
Bronze	Monica O'Kelly	1984 Stoke Mandeville / New York	Athletics	Slalom (leg) C2
Bronze	Jennifer Kiely	1984 Stoke Mandeville / New York	Athletics	Slalom C3
Bronze	Rosaleen Galagher	1984 Stoke Mandeville / New York	Athletics	Discus B1
Bronze	Monica O'Kelly	1984 Stoke Mandeville / New York	Athletics	Club throw C2
Bronze	Christina Dodrill	1984 Stoke Mandeville / New York	Athletics	Shot put 2
Bronze	Monica O'Kelly	1984 Stoke Mandeville / New York	Athletics	Shot put C2
Bronze	Jennifer Kiely	1984 Stoke Mandeville / New York	Athletics	Shot put C3
Bronze	Gerard Dunne	1984 Stoke Mandeville / New York	Swimming	100m freestyle 6
Bronze	Brendan Crean	1984 Stoke Mandeville / New York	Swimming	25m backstroke C3
Bronze	O. Rourke	1984 Stoke Mandeville / New York	Table tennis	Singles L2
Bronze	Morna Cloonan	1984 Stoke Mandeville / New York	Table tennis	Singles C4–C5
Bronze	Angela Hendra	1984 Stoke Mandeville / New York	Lawn Bowls	Women's singles paraplegic
Bronze	Alice Bailey; Angela Hendra	1984 Stoke Mandeville / New York	Lawn Bowls	Mixed pairs paraplegic
Gold	David Boland; Martin Costello; Lorraine Gallagher; Darrin Jordan	1988 Seoul	Athletics	Mixed 4 x 100m C2-3
Gold	Paul Cassin	1988 Seoul	Athletics	Men's Discus Throw C3
Gold	Martin Costello	1988 Seoul	Athletics	Men's Shot Put C3
Gold	Darrin Jordan	1988 Seoul	Athletics	Men's Slalom C2
Gold	Michael McCormack	1988 Seoul	Athletics	Men's Kick Ball C2
Gold	Alma Rock	1988 Seoul	Athletics	Women's 100m C8
Gold	John Twomey	1988 Seoul	Athletics	Men's Discus Throw 2
Gold	Ronan Tynan	1988 Seoul	Athletics	Men's Discus Throw A3A9
Gold	Theresa Ward	1988 Seoul	Athletics	Women's 100m C7
Gold	Thomas Leahy	1988 Seoul	Boccia	Mixed Individual C2
Gold	Teresa Mullen	1988 Seoul	Lawn Bowls	Women's Singles 2-6
Gold	Gerard Dunne	1988 Seoul	Swimming	Men's 100m Backstroke 6
Gold	Gerard Dunne	1988 Seoul	Swimming	Men's 100m Butterfly 6
Silver	Christina Dodrill	1988 Seoul	Athletics	Women's Shot Put 2
Silver	Cathy Dunne Fitzpatrick	1988 Seoul	Athletics	Women's Discus Throw 3
Silver	Lorraine Gallagher	1988 Seoul	Athletics	Women's Club Throw C3
Silver	Lorraine Gallagher	1988 Seoul	Athletics	Women's Discus Throw C3
Silver	Darrin Jordan	1988 Seoul	Athletics	Men's 200m C2
Silver	Thomas Leahy	1988 Seoul	Athletics	Men's Shot Put C2
Silver	John McGuinness	1988 Seoul	Athletics	Men's 1500m C8
Silver	Ronan Tynan	1988 Seoul	Athletics	Men's Shot Put A3A9
Silver	Theresa Ward	1988 Seoul	Athletics	Women's Javelin C7
Silver	William Behan; Francis Bell	1988 Seoul	Lawn Bowls	Men's Pairs 2-6
Silver	Michael White	1988 Seoul	Snooker	Men's Tournament Open
Bronze	David Boland	1988 Seoul	Athletics	Men's Kick Ball C2
Bronze	Christina Dodrill	1988 Seoul	Athletics	Women's Discus Throw 2
Bronze	Cathy Dunne Fitzpatrick	1988 Seoul	Athletics	Women's Pentathlon
Bronze	Darrin Jordan	1988 Seoul	Athletics	Men's 100m C2
Bronze	Darrin Jordan	1988 Seoul	Athletics	Men's 400m C2
Bronze	Thomas Leahy	1988 Seoul	Athletics	Men's Club Throw C2
Bronze	John McGuinness	1988 Seoul	Athletics	Men's Cross Country 5000m C8
Bronze	Camilla McMahon	1988 Seoul	Athletics	Women's 100m C8
Bronze	Kay McShane	1988 Seoul	Athletics	Women's 800m 4
Bronze	Kay McShane	1988 Seoul	Athletics	Women's Marathon 4
Bronze	Gerard Naughton	1988 Seoul	Athletics	Men's Shot Put C4
Bronze	Ronan Tynan	1988 Seoul	Athletics	Men's Javelin A3A9
Bronze	Team Ireland	1988 Seoul	Football	Men's Tournament
Bronze	Gerard Dunne	1988 Seoul	Swimming	Men's 100m Freestyle 6
Bronze	Gerard Dunne	1988 Seoul	Swimming	Men's 400m Freestyle 6
Bronze	Gerard Dunne	1988 Seoul	Swimming	Men's 200m Individual Medley 6
Bronze	Sean McGrath	1988 Seoul	Swimming	Men's 100m Breaststroke A4
Bronze	Team Ireland	1988 Seoul	TableTennis	Men's Teams C5-C8
Silver	Bridie Lynch	1992 Barcelona	Athletics	Women's Discus Throw B3
Silver	Bridie Lynch	1992 Barcelona	Athletics	Women's Pentathlon B3
Silver	Mairead Berry	1992 Barcelona	Swimming	Women's 50m Backstroke S2
Bronze	Alma Rock	1992 Barcelona	Athletics	Women's 400m C7-8
Bronze	William Johnston; Jason Kearney; Thomas Leahy; Martin McDonagh	1992 Barcelona	Boccia	Mixed C1-C3
Bronze	Team Ireland	1992 Barcelona	Football	Men's Tournament
Bronze	Siobhan Callanan; Esther Stynes	1992 Barcelona	TableTennis	Women's Teams 3
Gold	Bridie Lynch	1996 Atlanta	Athletics	Women's discus F12
Silver	Thomas Leahy	1996 Atlanta	Boccia	Men's individual C2
Silver	David Malone	1996 Atlanta	Swimming	Men's 100m backstroke S9
Silver	Mairead Berry	1996 Atlanta	Swimming	Women's 50m backstroke S2
Bronze	Sean O'Grady	1996 Atlanta	Athletics	Men's discus F54
Bronze	Mary Rice	1996 Atlanta	Athletics	Women's 200m T32-33
Bronze	Bridie Lynch	1996 Atlanta	Athletics	Women's shot put F12
Bronze	Sharon Rice	1996 Atlanta	Athletics	Women's shot put F32-33
Bronze	Grainne Barrett-Condron	1996 Atlanta	Athletics	Women's shot put F41
Bronze	Joan Salmon	1996 Atlanta	Equestrian	Women's kur canter grade III
Gold	Tom Leahy	2000 Sydney	Athletics	Men's discus F51
Gold	Gabriel Shelly	2000 Sydney	Boccia	Mixed individual BC1
Gold	Margaret Grant; John Cronin	2000 Sydney	Boccia	Mixed pairs BC3
Gold	David Malone	2000 Sydney	Swimming	Men's 100m backstroke S8
Gold	Mairead Berry	2000 Sydney	Swimming	Women's 100m freestyle S2
Silver	Mary Rice	2000 Sydney	Athletics	Women's 400m T34
Silver	Mairead Berry	2000 Sydney	Swimming	Women's 50m backstroke S2
Silver	Mairead Berry	2000 Sydney	Swimming	Women's 50m freestyle S2
Bronze	Catherine Walsh	2000 Sydney	Athletics	Women's pentathlon P13

=== Medallists (2004 - 2024) ===
Medal	Name	Games	Sport	Event
Silver	Conal McNamara	2004 Athens	Athletics	Men's 400m T13
Silver	John McCarthy	2004 Athens	Athletics	Men's discus throw F32/51
Silver	David Malone	2004 Athens	Swimming	Men's 100m backstroke S8
Bronze	Derek Malone	2004 Athens	Athletics	Men's 800m T38
Gold	Michael McKillop	2008 Beijing	Athletics	Men's 800 m T37
Gold	Jason Smyth	2008 Beijing	Athletics	Men's 100 m T13
Gold	Jason Smyth	2008 Beijing	Athletics	Men's 200 m T13
Silver	Darragh McDonald	2008 Beijing	Swimming	Men's 400 m Freestyle S6
Bronze	Gabriel Shelly	2008 Beijing	Boccia	Mixed Individual BC1
Gold	Bethany Firth	2012 London	Swimming	Women's 100 metre backstroke S14
Gold	Darragh McDonald	2012 London	Swimming	Men's 400 metre freestyle S6
Gold	Jason Smyth	2012 London	Athletics	Men's 100 metres T13
Gold	Michael McKillop	2012 London	Athletics	Men's 800 metres T37
Gold	Michael McKillop	2012 London	Athletics	Men's 1500 metres T37
Gold	Mark Rohan	2012 London	Cycling	Men's road time trial H1
Gold	Mark Rohan	2012 London	Cycling	Men's road race H1
Gold	Jason Smyth	2012 London	Athletics	Men's 200 metres T13
Silver	Catherine Walsh; Pilot: Francine Meehan	2012 London	Cycling	Women's Ind B Pursuit
Silver	Helen Kearney on Mister Cool	2012 London	Equestrian	Ind. Championship Test - Grade Ia
Silver	Catherine O'Neil	2012 London	Athletics	Women's discus F51/52
Bronze	Team Ireland	2012 London	Equestrian	Mixed Team Championship
Bronze	Helen Kearney on Mister Cool	2012 London	Equestrian	Individual freestyle test grade Ia
Bronze	Orla Barry	2012 London	Athletics	Women's Discus Throw F57/58
Bronze	James Brown; Pilot: Damien Shaw	2012 London	Cycling	Men's road time trial B
Bronze	Catherine Walsh; Pilot: Francine Meehan	2012 London	Cycling	Women's road time trial B
Gold	Jason Smyth	2016 Rio de Janeiro	Athletics	Men's 100m T13
Gold	Michael McKillop	2016 Rio de Janeiro	Athletics	Men's 1500m T37
Gold	Eoghan Clifford	2016 Rio de Janeiro	Cycling	Men's road time trial C3
Gold	Katie-George Dunlevy; Pilot: Eve McCrystal	2016 Rio de Janeiro	Cycling	Women's road time trial B
Silver	Colin Lynch	2016 Rio de Janeiro	Cycling	Men's road time trial C2
Silver	Orla Barry	2016 Rio de Janeiro	Athletics	Women's discus F57
Silver	Niamh McCarthy	2016 Rio de Janeiro	Athletics	Women's discus F41
Silver	Katie-George Dunlevy; Pilot: Eve McCrystal	2016 Rio de Janeiro	Cycling	Women's road race B
Bronze	Eoghan Clifford	2016 Rio de Janeiro	Cycling	Men's individual pursuit C3
Bronze	Ellen Keane	2016 Rio de Janeiro	Swimming	Women's 100 metre breaststroke SB8
Bronze	Noelle Lenihan	2016 Rio de Janeiro	Athletics	Women's discus F38
Gold	Ellen Keane	2020 Tokyo	Swimming	Women's 100 metre breaststroke SB8
Gold	Jason Smyth	2020 Tokyo	Athletics	Men's 100 metres T13
Gold	Katie-George Dunlevy; Pilot: Eve McCrystal	2020 Tokyo	Cycling	Women's road time trial B
Gold	Katie-George Dunlevy; Pilot: Eve McCrystal	2020 Tokyo	Cycling	Women's road race B
Silver	Katie-George Dunlevy; Pilot: Eve McCrystal	2020 Tokyo	Cycling	Women's individual pursuit B
Silver	Nicole Turner	2020 Tokyo	Swimming	Women's 50 metre butterfly S6
Bronze	Gary O'Reilly	2020 Tokyo	Cycling	Men's road time trial H5
Gold	Katie-George Dunlevy; Pilot: Linda Kelly	2024 Paris	Cycling	Women's Road Race B Time Trial
Silver	Katie-George Dunlevy; Pilot: Eve McCrystal	2024 Paris	Cycling	Women's B 3000m Individual Pursuit
Silver	Katie-George Dunlevy; Pilot: Linda Kelly	2024 Paris	Cycling	Women's B Road Race
Silver	Róisín Ní Ríain	2024 Paris	Swimming	Women's 100m backstroke S13
Bronze	Róisín Ní Ríain	2024 Paris	Swimming	Women's 200m Individual Medley SM13
Bronze	Orla Comerford	2024 Paris	Athletics	Women's 100m T13

== See also ==
- Ireland at the Olympics
- Paralympics Ireland
