= Ireland at the 2000 Summer Paralympics =

- IPC code: IRL
- NPC: Paralympics Ireland
- Website: www.paralympics.ie

in Sydney
- Competitors: 39 (24 male, 15 female)
- Medals Ranked 31st: Gold 5 Silver 3 Bronze 1 Total 9

Summer Paralympics appearances (overview)
- 1960; 1964; 1968; 1972; 1976; 1980; 1984; 1988; 1992; 1996; 2000; 2004; 2008; 2012; 2016; 2020; 2024

There were fifteen female and twenty-four male athletes representing the country at the 2000 Summer Paralympics, winning nine medals in total and with three of these being won by Mairead Berry.

== Medal table ==
Medal	Name	Sport	Event
Gold	Tom Leahy	Athletics	Men's discus F51
Gold	Gabriel Shelly	Boccia	Mixed individual BC1
Gold	Margaret Grant; John Cronin	Boccia	Mixed pairs BC3
Gold	David Malone	Swimming	Men's 100m backstroke S8
Gold	Mairead Berry	Swimming	Women's 100m freestyle S2
Silver	Mary Rice	Athletics	Women's 400m T34
Silver	Mairead Berry	Swimming	Women's 50m backstroke S2
Silver	Mairead Berry	Swimming	Women's 50m freestyle S2
Bronze	Catherine Walsh	Athletics	Women's pentathlon P13

== See also ==
- Ireland at the 2000 Summer Olympics
- Ireland at the Paralympics

== Bibliography ==
- International Paralympic Committee (2000). "Appendix C: Athlete Numbers - By Delegation". Sydney 2000 Paralympic Games Post Games Report. Sydney.
