= Ireland at the 2012 Summer Paralympics =

- IPC code: IRL
- NPC: Paralympics Ireland
- Website: www.paralympics.ie

in London
- Competitors: 49 in 10 sports
- Flag bearers: Cathal Miller (opening); Gabriel Shelly (closing)
- Medals Ranked 19th: Gold 8 Silver 3 Bronze 5 Total 16

Summer Paralympics appearances (overview)
- 1960; 1964; 1968; 1972; 1976; 1980; 1984; 1988; 1992; 1996; 2000; 2004; 2008; 2012; 2016; 2020; 2024

Ireland competed at the 2012 Summer Paralympics in London, United Kingdom from August 29 to September 9, 2012. There are 49 participants representing Ireland at the games, competing across ten sports.

These were the best Paralympics for Ireland since 1988 Summer Paralympics in Seoul, South Korea winning 13 gold, 11 silver, and 18 bronze. For its efforts the Team was presented with a People of the Year Award in September 2012.

== Medallists ==
Medal	Name	Sport	Event	Date
Gold	Bethany Firth	Swimming	Women's 100 metre backstroke S14	31 August
Gold	Darragh McDonald	Swimming	Men's 400 metre freestyle S6	1 September
Gold	Jason Smyth	Athletics	Men's 100 metres T13	1 September
Gold	Michael McKillop	Athletics	Men's 800 metres T37	1 September
Gold	Michael McKillop	Athletics	Men's 1500 metres T37	3 September
Gold	Mark Rohan	Cycling	Men's road time trial H1	5 September
Gold	Mark Rohan	Cycling	Men's road race H1	7 September
Gold	Jason Smyth	Athletics	Men's 200 metres T13	7 September
Silver	Catherine Walsh; Francine Meehan (pilot)	Cycling	Women's Ind B Pursuit	2 September
Silver	Helen Kearney on Mister Cool	Equestrian	Ind. Championship Test - Grade Ia	2 September
Silver	Catherine O'Neil	Athletics	Women's discus F51/52	7 September
Bronze	Team Ireland	Equestrian	Mixed Team Championship	2 September
Bronze	Helen Kearney on Mister Cool	Equestrian	Individual freestyle test grade Ia	4 September
Bronze	Orla Barry	Athletics	Women's Discus Throw F57/58	4 September
Bronze	James Brown; Damien Shaw (pilot)	Cycling	Men's road time trial B	5 September
Bronze	Catherine Walsh; Francine Meehan (pilot)	Cycling	Women's road time trial B	5 September

Medals by sport
Sport	Gold medal	Silver medal	Bronze medal	Total
Athletics	4	1	1	6
Cycling	2	1	2	5
Equestrian	0	1	2	3
Swimming	2	0	0	2
Total	8	3	5	16

== Key Moments ==
On 1 September, Paralympics Ireland celebrated one of their most successful days at any Paralympic Games by earning three gold medals. Of these gold medals, two were world record breaking performances. Jason Smyth retained his Men's 100 metres T13 title, by breaking his own world record with a time of 10.46 seconds, making him the fastest Paralympian in the world over 100 metres. The same day, Michael McKillop set a new world best of 1.57.22 in the Men's 800 metres T32 race, also retaining his win in Beijing.
On 2 September, Catherine Walsh accompanied by pilot Francine Meehan, won Paralympics Ireland's first ever cycling medal of any colour at the Paralympic Games.

== Athletics ==
=== Track ===
Athlete	Event	Heat		Final	
Athlete	Event	Result	Rank	Result	Rank
Jason Smyth	Men's 100m T13	10.54 WR	1	10.46 WR	1st place, gold medalist(s)
Jason Smyth	Men's 200m T13	21.48	1	21.05 WR	1st place, gold medalist(s)
John McCarthy	Men's 100m T51	—N/a			7
Michael McKillop	Men's 800m T37	—N/a		1:57.22 WR	1st place, gold medalist(s)
Michael McKillop	Men's 1500m T37	—N/a		4:08.11 PR	1st place, gold medalist(s)
Heather Jameson	Women's 100m T37	15.08 PB	7	Did Not Advance	
Heather Jameson	Women's 200m T37	32.76	7	Did Not Advance	

=== Field ===
Athlete	Event	Final	
Athlete	Event	Result	Rank
John McCarthy	Men's Club Throw	20.36	15
Raymond O'Dwyer	F34 Men's Discus Throw	30.34	18
Raymond O'Dwyer	F34 Men's Javelin Throw	18.58	17
Raymond O'Dwyer	F34 Men's Shot Put	8.86	15
John McCarthy	F57 Men's Shot Put	10.70	13
Catherine O'Neill	Women's Club Throw	13.64	4
Catherine O'Neill	F51 Women's Discus Throw	5.66	2nd place, silver medalist(s)
Ailish Dunne	F11 Women's Discus Throw	18.38	13
Ailish Dunne	F11 Women's Shot Put	6.67	12
Nadine Lattimore	F11 Women's Shot Put	6.06	18
Orla Barry	F57 Women's Discus Throw	28.12	3rd place, bronze medalist(s)
Heather Jameson	F37 Women's Long Jump	4.11	7

== Boccia ==
=== Individual events ===
Athlete	Event	Seeding matches	Round of 32	Round of 16	Quarterfinals	Semifinals	Finals	
Athlete	Event	Opposition Score	Opposition Score	Opposition Score	Opposition Score	Opposition Score	Opposition Score	Rank
Roberta Connolly	Mixed individual BC2	Bye	Mezik (SVK); L 2-5	did not advance				
Tom Leahy	Mixed individual BC2	Bye	Valente (POR); L 1-6	did not advance				
Johnny Cronin	Mixed individual BC3	Taha (SIN); W 6-4	—N/a	Taha (SIN); L 1-7	did not advance			

=== Pairs and team events ===
Athlete	Event	Pool matches			Quarterfinals	Semifinals	Finals	
Athlete	Event	Opposition Score	Opposition Score	Rank	Opposition Score	Opposition Score	Opposition Score	Rank
Roberta Connolly; Tom Leahy; Padraic Moran; Gabriel Shelly	Team BC1-2	South Korea (KOR); L 3-14	Brazil (BRA); L 2-11	3	did not advance			

== Equestrian ==
Individual

Athlete	Horse	Event	Total	
Athlete	Horse	Event	Score	Rank
Eilish Byrne	Youri	Ind. champ. test grade II	73.429	5
Eilish Byrne	Youri	Ind. freestyle test grade II	75.250	4
James Dwyer	Orlando	Ind. champ. test grade IV	68.516	6
James Dwyer	Orlando	Ind. freestyle test grade IV	74.400	6
Helen Kearney	Mister Cool	Ind. champ. test grade Ia	76.700	2nd place, silver medalist(s)
Helen Kearney	Mister Cool	Ind. freestyle test grade Ia	78.450	3rd place, bronze medalist(s)
Geraldine Savage	Blues Tip Top Too	Ind. champ. test grade Ia	68.800	7
Geraldine Savage	Blues Tip Top Too	Ind. freestyle test grade Ia	72.300	5

Team

Athlete	Horse	Event	Individual Score			Total	
Athlete	Horse	Event	TT	CT	Total	Score	Rank
Eilish Byrne	See above	Team	67.714	73.429	141.143*	428.313	3rd place, bronze medalist(s)
James Dwyer	See above	Team	69.719	68.516	138.235*	428.313	3rd place, bronze medalist(s)
Helen Kearney	See above	Team	72.235	76.700	148.935*	428.313	3rd place, bronze medalist(s)
Geraldine Savage	See above	Team	68.000	68.800	136.800	428.313	3rd place, bronze medalist(s)

* Indicates that score counts in team total

== Powerlifting ==
Men

Athlete	Event	Result	Rank
Roy Guerin	-67.5kg	131.0	10

== Rowing ==
Athlete(s)	Event	Heats		Repechage		Final	
Athlete(s)	Event	Time	Rank	Time	Rank	Time	Rank
Helen Arbuthnot (cox); Sarah Caffrey; Anne-Marie McDaid; Kevin du Toit; Shane Ryan	Mixed coxed four	3:33.95	5 R	3:34.85	4 FB	3:36.72	4

Qualification Legend: FA=Final A (medal); FB=Final B (non-medal); R=Repechage

== Sailing ==
Athlete	Event	Race											Net points	Rank
Athlete	Event	1	2	3	4	5	6	7	8	9	10	11*	Net points	Rank
Anthony Hegarty; Ian Costelloe; John Twomey	Sonar - 3 person keelboat	11	7	7	10	9	10	2	(13)	10	10	—N/a	76	11

* Due to a lack of wind Race 11 was cancelled

== Shooting ==
Athlete	Event	Qualification		Final	
Athlete	Event	Score	Rank	Score	Rank
Sean Baldwin	Men's 50m Rifle 3 Positions SH1	1112	17	did not advance	
Sean Baldwin	Men's 10m Air Rifle Standing SH1	553	29	did not advance	
Sean Baldwin	Mixed 50m Rifle Prone SH1	585	18	did not advance	
Sean Baldwin	Mixed 10m Air Rifle Prone SH1	589	43	did not advance	

== See also ==
- Ireland at the 2012 Summer Olympics
- 2012 Olympics gold post boxes in the United Kingdom
