= Ireland at the 2004 Summer Paralympics =

- IPC code: IRL
- NPC: Paralympics Ireland
- Website: www.paralympics.ie

in Athens
- Competitors: 42 in 7 sports
- Medals Ranked 61st: Gold 0 Silver 3 Bronze 1 Total 4

Summer Paralympics appearances (overview)
- 1960; 1964; 1968; 1972; 1976; 1980; 1984; 1988; 1992; 1996; 2000; 2004; 2008; 2012; 2016; 2020; 2024

Ireland competed at the 2004 Summer Paralympics in Athens, Greece. The team included forty-two athletes, thirty-four men and eight women. Irish competitors won four medals, three silver and one bronze to finish sixty-first in the medal table.

== Medallists ==
Medal	Name	Sport	Event
Silver	Conal McNamara	Athletics	Men's 400m T13
Silver	John McCarthy	Athletics	Men's discus throw F32/51
Silver	David Malone	Swimming	Men's 100m backstroke S8
Bronze	Derek Malone	Athletics	Men's 800m T38

== Sports ==
=== Athletics ===
==== Men's track ====
Athlete	Class	Event	Heats		Semifinal		Final	
Athlete	Class	Event	Result	Rank	Result	Rank	Result	Rank
John Fulham	T53	100m	15.80	7 Q	—		15.67	6
John Fulham	T53	200m	27.98	12	did not advance			
Derek Malone	T38	400m	54.35	7 q	—		54.84	7
Derek Malone	T38	800m	—				2:01.76	3rd place, bronze medalist(s)
Conal McNamara	T13	200m	23.58	9	did not advance			
Conal McNamara	T13	400m	—				50.62	2nd place, silver medalist(s)

==== Men's field ====
Athlete	Class	Event	Final		
Athlete	Class	Event	Result	Points	Rank
Garrett Culliton	F52	Discus	15.86	-	5
Garrett Culliton	F52	Shot put	6.81	-	10
Garrett Jameson	F32/51	Club throw	26.32	890	7
Tom Leahy	F32	Shot put	5.96	-	7
John McCarthy	F32/51	Club throw	19.21	750	9
John McCarthy	F32/51	Discus	9.74	1078	2nd place, silver medalist(s)

==== Women's track ====
Athlete	Class	Event	Heats		Semifinal		Final	
Athlete	Class	Event	Result	Rank	Result	Rank	Result	Rank
Patrice Dockery	T54	5000m	DNF		—		12:50.84	9
Catherine Walsh	T13	400m	—				1:05.99	6

==== Women's field ====
Athlete	Class	Event	Final		
Athlete	Class	Event	Result	Points	Rank
Lisa Callaghan	F35-38	Javelin	24.12	1087	5
Rosemary Tallon	F33/34/52/53	Javelin	8.72	1214	4
Catherine Walsh	F13	Long jump	4.55	-	6

=== Boccia ===
==== Individual events ====
Athlete	Event	Preliminaries			Round of 16	Quarterfinals	Semifinals	Final	
Athlete	Event	Opponent	Opposition Score	Rank	Opposition Score	Opposition Score	Opposition Score	Opposition Score	Rank
Gabriel Shelly	Mixed individual BC1	Beltran (ESP)	L 3-9	3	did not advance				
Gabriel Shelly	Mixed individual BC1	Taksee (THA)	L 2-9	3	did not advance				
Gabriel Shelly	Mixed individual BC1	Pearse (GBR)	W 7-3	3	did not advance				
Gabriel Shelly	Mixed individual BC1	Villano (ARG)	W 11-0	3	did not advance				
Gabriel Shelly	Mixed individual BC1	Gahleitner (AUT)	W 6-1	3	did not advance				
Roberta Connolly	Mixed individual BC2	Ferreira (POR)	L 1-9	2 Q	P Silva (POR); L 0-5	did not advance			
Roberta Connolly	Mixed individual BC2	Scalise (ARG)	W 4-1	2 Q	P Silva (POR); L 0-5	did not advance			
Roberta Connolly	Mixed individual BC2	Kwok (HKG)	W 4-3	2 Q	P Silva (POR); L 0-5	did not advance			
Keith Hayes	Mixed individual BC2	Murray (GBR)	L 1-8	2 Q	Flood (NZL); L 0-9	did not advance			
Keith Hayes	Mixed individual BC2	Femtegield (NOR)	W 5-4	2 Q	Flood (NZL); L 0-9	did not advance			
Keith Hayes	Mixed individual BC2	Tsilikopoulou (GRE)	W/O	2 Q	Flood (NZL); L 0-9	did not advance			
Martina Murphy	Mixed individual BC2	Steirer (AUT)	L 0-7	4	did not advance				
Martina Murphy	Mixed individual BC2	Siddiqi (DEN)	L 4-10	4	did not advance				
Martina Murphy	Mixed individual BC2	Mongkolpun (THA)	L 0-10	4	did not advance				
John Cronin	Mixed individual BC3	Hanson (USA)	L 2-5	4	did not advance				
John Cronin	Mixed individual BC3	Polychronidis (GRE)	L 1-4	4	did not advance				
John Cronin	Mixed individual BC3	Macedo (POR)	L 3-7	4	did not advance				
John Cronin	Mixed individual BC3	Bidlas (CZE)	W 14-0	4	did not advance				
Gerry O'Grady	Mixed individual BC3	Pesquera (ESP)	L 1-8	4	did not advance				
Gerry O'Grady	Mixed individual BC3	Kabush (CAN)	L 4-6	4	did not advance				
Gerry O'Grady	Mixed individual BC3	Krenek (CZE)	L 2-3	4	did not advance				

==== Pairs/teams ====
Athlete	Event	Preliminaries			Semifinals	Final	
Athlete	Event	Opponent	Opposition Score	Rank	Opposition Score	Opposition Score	Rank
John Cronin; Gerry O'Grady	Pairs BC3	Pesquera (ESP) / J M Rodriguez (ESP)	L 1-3	3	did not advance		
John Cronin; Gerry O'Grady	Pairs BC3	Jackson (NZL) / Dijkstra (NZL)	L 0-10	3	did not advance		
John Cronin; Gerry O'Grady	Pairs BC3	Bidlas (CZE) / Krenek (CZE)	W 5-3	3	did not advance		
Roberta Connolly; Keith Hayes; Martina Murphy; Gabriel Shelly	Mixed team BC1/2	Portugal (POR)	L 3-8	4	did not advance		
Roberta Connolly; Keith Hayes; Martina Murphy; Gabriel Shelly	Mixed team BC1/2	New Zealand (NZL)	L 3-9	4	did not advance		
Roberta Connolly; Keith Hayes; Martina Murphy; Gabriel Shelly	Mixed team BC1/2	Hong Kong (HKG)	L 4-9	4	did not advance		
Roberta Connolly; Keith Hayes; Martina Murphy; Gabriel Shelly	Mixed team BC1/2	Thailand (THA)	W 11-1	4	did not advance		
Roberta Connolly; Keith Hayes; Martina Murphy; Gabriel Shelly	Mixed team BC1/2	Denmark (DEN)	W 7-3	4	did not advance		

=== Cycling ===
==== Men's road ====
Athlete	Event	Time	Rank
Denis Toomey; Mark Kehoe (pilot)	Men's road race/time trial tandem B1-3	34:52	19

==== Men's track ====
Athlete	Event	Qualification		1st round		Final	
Athlete	Event	Time	Rank	Time	Rank	Opposition Time	Rank
Ian Mahon; Mark Kehoe (pilot)	Men's 1km time trial tandem B1-3	—				1:14.38	18
Ian Mahon; Mark Kehoe (pilot)	Men's individual pursuit tandem B1-3	5:15.37	17	did not advance			

=== Equestrian ===
Athlete	Event	Total	
Athlete	Event	Score	Rank
Breda Bernie	Mixed individual championship test grade II	55.000	17
Breda Bernie	Mixed individual freestyle test grade II	61.833	19

=== Football 7-a-side ===
The men's team didn't win any medals: they were 7th out of 8 teams.

==== Players ====
- Aidan Brennan
- Andrew Clint
- Kieran Devlin
- Paul Dollard
- Darren Kavanagh
- Joseph Markey
- Gary Messett
- James Murrihy
- Brendan O'Grady
- Alan O'Hara
- Peter O'Neill
- Finbarr O'Riordan

==== Tournament ====
Game	Match	Score	Rank
1	Ireland vs. Ukraine (UKR)	0 - 6	4
2	Ireland vs. Argentina (ARG)	2 - 5	4
3	Ireland vs. Iran (IRI)	2 - 7	4
7th/8th classification	Ireland vs. United States (USA)	4 - 0	7

=== Judo ===
Athlete	Event	Preliminary	Quarterfinals	Semifinals	Repechage round 1	Repechage round 2	Final/ Bronze medal contest
Athlete	Event	Opposition Result	Opposition Result	Opposition Result	Opposition Result	Opposition Result	Opposition Result
Michael Doyle	Men's 73kg	Krieger (GER); L 99-99	did not advance				
Tony White	Men's 81kg	Jonard (FRA); L 0000-1000	—		Lopez (USA); L 0000-1000	did not advance	

=== Swimming ===
==== Men ====
Athlete	Class	Event	Heats		Final	
Athlete	Class	Event	Result	Rank	Result	Rank
David Malone	S8	100m backstroke	1:13.64	3 Q	1:12.55	2nd place, silver medalist(s)
Aidan McGlynn	S9	50m freestyle	29.15	19	did not advance	

==== Women ====
Athlete	Class	Event	Heats		Final	
Athlete	Class	Event	Result	Rank	Result	Rank
Claire Conway	S9	100m butterfly	1:24.37	16	did not advance	

== See also ==
- Ireland at the Paralympics
- Ireland at the 2004 Summer Olympics
