= Ireland at the 2008 Summer Paralympics =

- IPC code: IRL
- NPC: Paralympics Ireland
- Website: www.paralympics.ie

in Beijing
- Competitors: 45 in 9 sports
- Flag bearer: Patrice Dockery
- Medals Ranked 36th: Gold 3 Silver 1 Bronze 1 Total 5

Summer Paralympics appearances (overview)
- 1960; 1964; 1968; 1972; 1976; 1980; 1984; 1988; 1992; 1996; 2000; 2004; 2008; 2012; 2016; 2020; 2024

Ireland competed at the 2008 Summer Paralympics in Beijing. Ireland sent 45 athletes, competing in 9 sports. The country's flagbearer at the Games' opening ceremony was Patrice Dockery.

== Medallists ==
Medal	Name	Sport	Event
Gold	Michael McKillop	Athletics	Men's 800 m T37
Gold	Jason Smyth	Athletics	Men's 100 m T13
Gold	Jason Smyth	Athletics	Men's 200 m T13
Silver	Darragh McDonald	Swimming	Men's 400 m Freestyle S6
Bronze	Gabriel Shelly	Boccia	Mixed Individual BC1

== Sports ==
=== Archery ===
Athlete	Event	Ranking round		Round of 32	Round of 16	Quarterfinals	Semifinals	Finals	
Athlete	Event	Score	Seed	Opposition score	Opposition score	Opposition score	Opposition score	Opposition score	Rank
Sean Heary	Men's individual compound	652	20	Arenz (GER); W 108-104	Go (KOR); W 113-112	Horner (SUI); L 99-113	did not advance		

=== Athletics ===
==== Men's track ====
Athlete	Class	Event	Heats		Semifinal		Final	
Athlete	Class	Event	Result	Rank	Result	Rank	Result	Rank
Roy Patrick Guerin	T53	100m	16.59	12	did not advance			
Michael McKillop	T37	800m	—N/a				1:59.39 WR	1st place, gold medalist(s)
Jason Smyth	T13	100m	10.81 WR	1 Q	—N/a		10.62 WR	1st place, gold medalist(s)
Jason Smyth	T13	200m	21.81 WR	1 Q	—N/a		21.43 WR	1st place, gold medalist(s)

==== Men's field ====
Athlete	Class	Event	Final		
Athlete	Class	Event	Result	Points	Rank
Eoin Thomas Cleare	F32	Shot put	6.11	-	7
Garrett Culliton	F33-34/52	Discus throw	17.79	953	5
John McCarthy	F32/51	Club throw	19.53	811	11
John McCarthy	F32/51	Discus throw	9.48	966	9

==== Women's track ====
Athlete	Class	Event	Heats		Final	
Athlete	Class	Event	Result	Rank	Result	Rank
Patrice Dockery	T53	100m	18.90	10	did not advance	
Patrice Dockery	T53	200m	35.38	12	did not advance	
Patrice Dockery	T53	400m	1:08.95	11	did not advance	

==== Women's field ====
Athlete	Class	Event	Final		
Athlete	Class	Event	Result	Points	Rank
Orla Barry	F57-58	Discus throw	27.08	1027	5
Catherine Wayland	F32-34/51-53	Discus throw	6.13	1010	6

=== Boccia ===
Athlete	Event	Preliminaries			Quarterfinals	Semifinals	Final	
Athlete	Event	Opponent	Opposition Score	Rank	Opposition Score	Opposition Score	Opposition Score	Rank
Padraic Moran	Mixed individual BC1	Marques (POR)	L 2-4	1 Q	Wang Y (CHN); L 5-6	did not advance		
Padraic Moran	Mixed individual BC1	Sanders (NZL)	W 7-3	1 Q	Wang Y (CHN); L 5-6	did not advance		
Padraic Moran	Mixed individual BC1	Smith (GBR)	W 9-0	1 Q	Wang Y (CHN); L 5-6	did not advance		
Padraic Moran	Mixed individual BC1	Aandalen (NOR)	W 4-2	1 Q	Wang Y (CHN); L 5-6	did not advance		
Gabriel Shelly	Mixed individual BC1	Park J S (KOR)	L 3-5	1 Q	Vaquerizo (ESP); W 8-2	Marques (POR); L 1-4	Wang Y (CHN); W 6-2	3rd place, bronze medalist(s)
Gabriel Shelly	Mixed individual BC1	Richardson (CAN)	W 4-2	1 Q	Vaquerizo (ESP); W 8-2	Marques (POR); L 1-4	Wang Y (CHN); W 6-2	3rd place, bronze medalist(s)
Gabriel Shelly	Mixed individual BC1	Ibarbure (ARG)	W 3-2	1 Q	Vaquerizo (ESP); W 8-2	Marques (POR); L 1-4	Wang Y (CHN); W 6-2	3rd place, bronze medalist(s)
Gabriel Shelly	Mixed individual BC1	Kitani (JPN)	W 5-2	1 Q	Vaquerizo (ESP); W 8-2	Marques (POR); L 1-4	Wang Y (CHN); W 6-2	3rd place, bronze medalist(s)
Roberta Connolly	Mixed individual BC2	Cortez (ARG)	L 1-4	3	did not advance			
Roberta Connolly	Mixed individual BC2	Cao (CHN)	L 0-5	3	did not advance			
Roberta Connolly	Mixed individual BC2	Leglice (ARG)	W 4-3	3	did not advance			
Tom Leahy	Mixed individual BC2	F Ferreira (POR)	W 5-2	4	did not advance			
Tom Leahy	Mixed individual BC2	Bentley (GBR)	L 1-5	4	did not advance			
Tom Leahy	Mixed individual BC2	Kainuma (JPN)	L 2-4	4	did not advance			
Roberta Connolly; Tom Leahy; Padraic Moran; Gabriel Shelly	Mixed team BC1-2	Spain (ESP)	L 1-12	2 Q	China (CHN); L 2-12	did not advance		
Roberta Connolly; Tom Leahy; Padraic Moran; Gabriel Shelly	Mixed team BC1-2	Finland (FIN)	W 7-3	2 Q	China (CHN); L 2-12	did not advance		

=== Cycling ===
==== Men's road ====
Athlete	Event	Time	Rank
Cathal Gustavus Miller	Men's road race LC1/LC2/CP4	DNF	
Cathal Gustavus Miller	Men's road time trial LC1	36:33.95	9
Enda Smyth	Men's road race LC1/LC2/CP4	DNF	
Michael Delaney; David Patrick Peelo (pilot)	Men's road race B&VI 1-3	2:29:32	16
Michael Delaney; David Patrick Peelo (pilot)	Men's road time trial B&VI 1-3	36:26.54	18

==== Men's track ====
Athlete	Event	Qualification		1st round		Final	
Athlete	Event	Time	Rank	Time	Rank	Opposition Time	Rank
Cathal Gustavus Miller	Men's individual pursuit LC1	4:53.97	5	did not advance			
Cathal Gustavus Miller	Men's time trial LC1	—N/a				1:11.82	7
Enda Smyth	Men's individual pursuit CP4	3:55.919	7	did not advance			
Enda Smyth	Men's time trial CP4	—N/a				1:16.07	7
Michael Delaney; David Patrick Peelo	Men's individual pursuit B&VI 1-3	4:49.911	13	did not advance			
Michael Delaney; David Patrick Peelo	Men's sprint	11.460	6	Kilpatrick (RSA) / Thomson (RSA)	L 0-2	5-8th place matches Cowie (CAN) / Smibert (CAN); W 12.145	5
Michael Delaney; David Patrick Peelo	Men's time trial B&VI 1-3	—N/a				1:08.593	10

==== Women's road ====
Athlete	Event	Time	Rank
Catherine Mary Walsh; Joanna Hickey	Women's road race B&VI 1-3	2:03:14	9
Catherine Mary Walsh; Joanna Hickey	Women's road time trial B&VI 1-3	40:09.67	7

==== Women's track ====
Athlete	Event	Qualification		Final	
Athlete	Event	Time	Rank	Opposition Time	Rank
Catherine Mary Walsh; Joanna Hickey (pilot)	Women's individual pursuit B&VI 1-3	3:50.515	5	did not advance	
Catherine Mary Walsh; Joanna Hickey (pilot)	Women's time trial B&VI 1-3	—N/a		1:16.208	7

=== Equestrian ===
Athlete	Horse	Event	Total	
Athlete	Horse	Event	Score	Rank
Eilish Byrne	Youri	Mixed individual championship test grade II	62.818	11
Eilish Byrne	Youri	Mixed individual freestyle test grade II	65.833	8

=== Football 7-a-side ===
The men's football 7-a-side team didn't win any medals; they were 6th out of 8 teams.

==== Players ====
- Aidan Brennan
- Kieran Patrick Devlin
- Paul Dollard
- Luke Evans
- Mark Gerard Jones
- Darren Kavanagh
- Derek Michael Malone
- Joseph James Markey
- Brian McGillivary
- Gary Messett
- Alan O'Hara
- Finbarr O'Riordan

==== Tournament ====
8 September 2008
13:30

Ireland	2 - 4	Iran

Olympic Green Hockey Field
10 September 2008
11:15

Ukraine	7 - 0	Ireland

Olympic Green Hockey Field
Attendance: 6,763
12 September 2008
15:45

Ireland	1 - 1	Great Britain

Olympic Green Hockey Field

5th-8th place semi-finals

14 September 2008
11:30

China	1 - 4	Ireland

Olympic Green Hockey Field

5th-6th place match

16 September 2008
11:30

Ireland	2 - 4	Netherlands

Olympic Green Hockey Field
Attendance: 7,142
Referee: Kou Yadong (China)

=== Sailing ===
Five Irish athletes competed in the following events in sailing:

- Two-Person Keelboat - SKUD18
- Three-Person Keelboat - Sonar

=== Swimming ===
Ireland sent six representatives in swimming, including Dave Malone, Ellen Keane and Darragh McDonald.

=== Table tennis ===
Athlete	Event	Preliminaries				Quarterfinals	Semifinals	Final / BM	
Athlete	Event	Opposition Result	Opposition Result	Opposition Result	Rank	Opposition Result	Opposition Result	Opposition Result	Rank
Eimear Breathnach	Women's singles C1-2	Pezzutto (ITA); L 1–3	Pushpasheva (RUS); L 1–3	—N/a	3	did not advance			
Kathleen Reynolds	Women's singles C3	Li Q (CHN); L 1-3	Choi H J (KOR); L 1-3	Y Silva (CUB); L 2-3	3	did not advance			
Eimear Breathnach; Kathleen Reynolds	Women's team C1-3	—N/a				France (FRA); L 1-3	did not advance		

== See also ==
- 2008 Summer Paralympics
- Ireland at the Paralympics
- Ireland at the 2008 Summer Olympics
