= Ireland at the 1996 Summer Paralympics =

- IPC code: IRL
- NPC: Paralympics Ireland
- Website: www.paralympics.ie

in Atlanta
- Competitors: 63 (46 men and 17 women)
- Medals Ranked 45th: Gold 1 Silver 3 Bronze 6 Total 10

Summer Paralympics appearances (overview)
- 1960; 1964; 1968; 1972; 1976; 1980; 1984; 1988; 1992; 1996; 2000; 2004; 2008; 2012; 2016; 2020; 2024

63 athletes (46 men and 17 women) from Ireland competed at the 1996 Summer Paralympics in Atlanta, United States.

== Medallists ==
Medal	Name	Sport	Event
Gold	Bridie Lynch	Athletics	Women's discus F12
Silver	Thomas Leahy	Boccia	Men's individual C2
Silver	David Malone	Swimming	Men's 100m backstroke S9
Silver	Mairead Berry	Swimming	Women's 50m backstroke S2
Bronze	Sean O'Grady	Athletics	Men's discus F54
Bronze	Mary Rice	Athletics	Women's 200m T32-33
Bronze	Bridie Lynch	Athletics	Women's shot put F12
Bronze	Sharon Rice	Athletics	Women's shot put F32-33
Bronze	Grainne Barrett-Condron	Athletics	Women's shot put F41
Bronze	Joan Salmon	Equestrian	Women's kur canter grade III

== See also ==
- Ireland at the Paralympics
- Ireland at the 1996 Summer Olympics
