= Ireland at the 2016 Summer Paralympics =

- IPC code: IRL
- NPC: Paralympics Ireland
- Website: www.paralympics.ie

in Rio de Janeiro
- Competitors: 44 in 10 sports
- Medals Ranked 28th: Gold 4 Silver 4 Bronze 3 Total 11

Summer Paralympics appearances (overview)
- 1960; 1964; 1968; 1972; 1976; 1980; 1984; 1988; 1992; 1996; 2000; 2004; 2008; 2012; 2016; 2020; 2024

Ireland competed at the 2016 Summer Paralympics in Rio de Janeiro, Brazil, from 7 to 18 September 2016.

== Funding ==
Some international support for participation fell through at the last minute, resulting in severe cut back to the 2016 Summer Paralympics. This was in part a result of only 220,000 of the 2.5 million tickets to watch the Games in Rio being sold a month ahead of the Games. The Irish Paralympic Committee's CEO Liam Harbison told the Wall Street Journal that these cuts could have a catastrophic consequence for Paralympic athletes.

== Medallists ==
Medal	Name	Sport	Event	Date
Gold	Jason Smyth	Athletics	Men's 100m T13	9 September
Gold	Michael McKillop	Athletics	Men's 1500m T37	11 September
Gold	Eoghan Clifford	Cycling	Men's road time trial C3	14 September
Gold	Katie-George Dunlevy; Eve McCrystal (pilot)	Cycling	Women's road time trial B	14 September
Silver	Colin Lynch	Cycling	Men's road time trial C2	14 September
Silver	Orla Barry	Athletics	Women's discus F57	15 September
Silver	Niamh McCarthy	Athletics	Women's discus F41	15 September
Silver	Katie-George Dunlevy; Eve McCrystal (pilot)	Cycling	Women's road race B	17 September
Bronze	Eoghan Clifford	Cycling	Men's individual pursuit C3	9 September
Bronze	Ellen Keane	Swimming	Women's 100 metre breaststroke SB8	14 September
Bronze	Noelle Lenihan	Athletics	Women's discus F38	17 September

Medals by sport
Sport	1st place, gold medalist(s)	2nd place, silver medalist(s)	3rd place, bronze medalist(s)	Total
Athletics	2	2	1	5
Cycling	2	2	1	5
Swimming	0	0	1	1
Total	4	4	3	11

Medals by date
Date	1st place, gold medalist(s)	2nd place, silver medalist(s)	3rd place, bronze medalist(s)	Total
9 Sept	1	0	1	2
11 Sept	1	0	0	1
14 Sept	2	1	1	4
15 Sept	0	2	0	2
17 Sept	0	1	1	2
Total	4	4	3	11

Medals by gender
Gender	1st place, gold medalist(s)	2nd place, silver medalist(s)	3rd place, bronze medalist(s)	Total
Male	3	1	1	5
Female	1	3	2	6
Total	4	4	3	11

== Disability classifications ==
Every participant at the Paralympics has their disability grouped into one of five disability categories; amputation, the condition may be congenital or sustained through injury or illness; cerebral palsy; wheelchair athletes, there is often overlap between this and other categories; visual impairment, including blindness; Les autres, any physical disability that does not fall strictly under one of the other categories, for example dwarfism or multiple sclerosis. Each Paralympic sport then has its own classifications, dependent upon the specific physical demands of competition. Events are given a code, made of numbers and letters, describing the type of event and classification of the athletes competing. Some sports, such as athletics, divide athletes by both the category and severity of their disabilities, other sports, for example swimming, group competitors from different categories together, the only separation being based on the severity of the disability.

== Athletics ==
Ireland were represented with 10 athletes in Athletics.

=== Track ===
Athlete	Event	Heat		Final	
Athlete	Event	Result	Rank	Result	Rank
Jason Smyth	Men's 100m T13	10.76 Q	1	10.64	1st place, gold medalist(s)
Paul Keogan	Men's 400m T37	DSQ	–	Did not Advance	
Patrick Monahan	Men's 800m T53	DSQ	–	Did not Advance	
Patrick Monahan	Men's Marathon T53	—N/a		1:40.26	26
Michael McKillop	Men's 1500m T37	—N/a		4:12.11	1st place, gold medalist(s)
Orla Comerford	Women's 100m T13	12.81 q	4	12.87	8
Greta Streimikyte	Women's 1500m T13	4:51.75 q	3	4:45.06	4

=== Field ===
Athlete	Event	Final	
Athlete	Event	Mark	Rank
Deirdre Morgan	Women's Shot Put F53	4.04	5
Noelle Lenihan	Women's Discus F37/38	31.71 PR	3rd place, bronze medalist(s)
Niamh McCarthy	Women's Discus F41	26.67	2nd place, silver medalist(s)
Orla Barry	Women's Discus F56/F57	30.06	2nd place, silver medalist(s)

== Cycling ==
With one pathway for qualification being one highest ranked NPCs on the UCI Para-Cycling male and female Nations Ranking Lists on 31 December 2014, Ireland qualified for the 2016 Summer Paralympics in Rio, assuming they continued to meet all other eligibility requirements.

== Equestrian ==
The country earned an individual slot via the Para Equestrian Individual Ranking List Allocation method.

== Football 7-a-side football ==
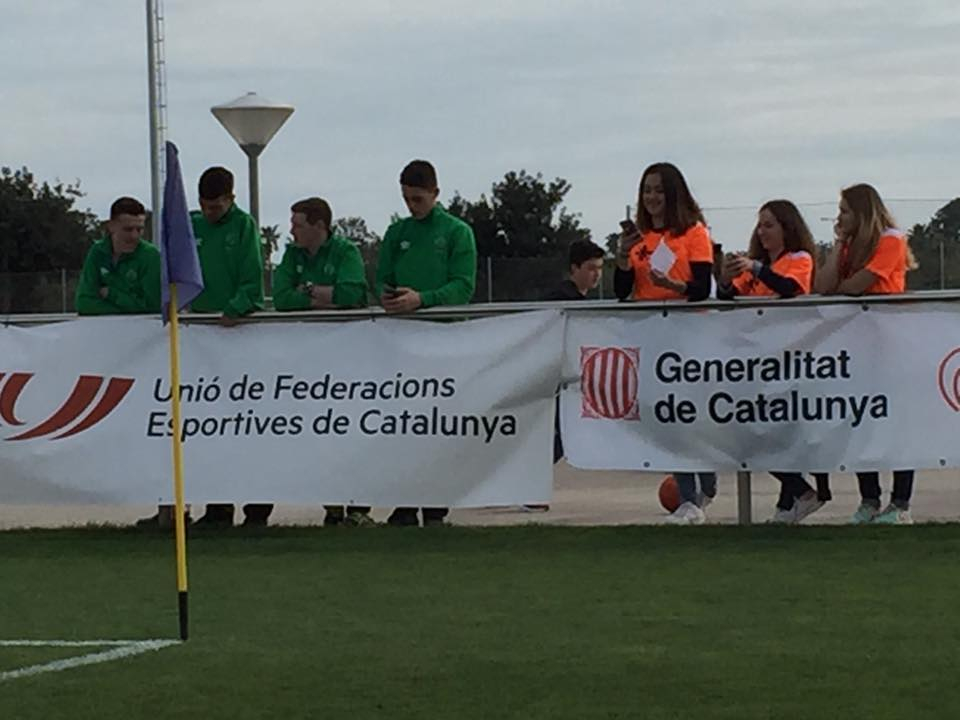
Members of the Irish team (left) watch the final of the IFCPF Pre Paralympic Tournament Salou 2016 between Ukraine and Brazil.

Ireland national 7-a-side football team qualified for the Rio Paralympics at 2015 World Championships because of their sixth-place finish.

The draw for the tournament was held on May 6 at the 2016 Pre Paralympic Tournament in Salou, Spain. Ireland was put into Group A with Ukraine, Great Britain and Brazil. The tournament where the draw took place featured 7 of the 8 teams participating in Rio. It was the last major preparation event ahead of the Rio Games for all teams participating. Ireland finished 5th after winning both their placement matches to the United States 4 - 3 and Argentina 0 - 3. Their roster for this tournament included Brian McGillivary, Joe Markey, Darragh Snell, Luke Evans, Eric O'Flaherty, Paraic Leacy, Gary Messett, Carl McKee, Aaron Tier, Dillon Sheridan, Tomiwa Badun, Ryan Nolan, Simon L'Estrange and Conor Tuite.

Going into the Rio Games, the country was ranked fifth in the world.

Pos	Team	Pld	W	D	L	GF	GA	GD	Pts	Qualification
1	Ukraine	3	3	0	0	10	2	+8	9	Semi finals
2	Brazil (H)	3	2	0	1	10	4	+6	6	Semi finals
3	Great Britain	3	1	0	2	7	5	+2	3	5th–6th place match
4	Ireland	3	0	0	3	2	18	−16	0	7th–8th place match

Source: Paralympic.org
(H) Hosts

== Sailing ==
One pathway for qualifying for Rio involved having a boat have top seven finish at the 2015 Combined World Championships in a medal event where the country had nor already qualified through via the 2014 IFDS Sailing World Championships. Ireland qualified for the 2016 Games under this criterion in the Sonar event with a ninth-place finish overall and the fourth country who had not qualified via the 2014 Championships.

== Shooting ==
The country sent shooters to 2015 IPC IPC Shooting World Cup in Osijek, Croatia, where Rio direct qualification was available. They earned a qualifying spot at this event based on the performance of Sean Baldwin in the R7 – 50m Rifle 3 Positions Men SH1 event.

== See also ==
- Ireland at the 2016 Summer Olympics
