= Ireland at the 1984 Summer Paralympics =

- IPC code: IRL
- NPC: Paralympics Ireland
- Website: www.paralympics.ie

in Stoke Mandeville/New York
- Competitors: 53
- Medals Ranked 14th: Gold 20 Silver 15 Bronze 31 Total 66

Summer Paralympics appearances (overview)
- 1960; 1964; 1968; 1972; 1976; 1980; 1984; 1988; 1992; 1996; 2000; 2004; 2008; 2012; 2016; 2020; 2024

Ireland competed at the 1984 Summer Paralympics in Stoke Mandeville, Great Britain and New York City, United States. 53 competitors from Ireland won 66 medals including 20 gold, 15 silver and 31 bronze and finished 14th in the medal table.

== Medalists ==
Medal	Name	Sport	Event
Gold	Ronan Tynan	Athletics	Long jump A3
Gold	David McNally	Athletics	Long jump C8
Gold	Brendan Crean	Athletics	Club throw C3
Gold	Ronan Tynan	Athletics	Discus throw A3
Gold	William Johnston	Athletics	Distance throw C1
Gold	Ronan Tynan	Athletics	Shot put A3
Gold	Tom Leahy	Athletics	Shot put C2
Gold	Dermot Walsh	Athletics	Slalom C2
Gold	Carol Carr	Athletics	400m B2
Gold	Morna Cloonan	Athletics	1000m Cross country C6
Gold	Cathy Dunne	Athletics	Discus throw 3
Gold	Rosaleen Galagher	Athletics	Shot put B1
Gold	Morna Cloonan	Athletics	Shot put C6
Gold	Gerard Dunne	Swimming	100m backstroke 6
Gold	Gerard Dunne	Swimming	100m butterfly 6
Gold	Morna Cloonan	Swimming	25m backstroke C6
Gold	Jimmy Gibson	Snooker	Men's paraplegic
Gold	Bill Ensor; Paul Smyth	Lawn Bowls	Men's pairs A2/4
Gold	Paul Smyth	Lawn Bowls	Men's singles A2/4
Gold	Alice Bailey; Angela Hendra	Lawn Bowls	Women's pairs paraplegic
Silver	Gerry O'Rourke	Athletics	400m A1–A3
Silver	Ronan Tynan	Athletics	High jump A3
Silver	William Johnston	Athletics	Precision throw C1
Silver	John Creedon	Athletics	Club throw L1
Silver	Tom Leahy	Athletics	Club throw C2
Silver	Theresa Ward	Athletics	200m C7
Silver	Carol Carr	Athletics	1500m B2
Silver	Kay McShane	Athletics	Marathon 4
Silver	Rosaleen Galagher	Athletics	Javelin B1
Silver	Theresa Ward	Athletics	Javelin C7
Silver	Morna Cloonan	Athletics	Club throw C6
Silver	Gerard Dunne	Swimming	400m freestyle 6
Silver	Monica O'Kelly	Swimming	25m freestyle with aids C2
Silver	Ireland men	Football	7-a-side CP
Silver	Ireland women	Table tennis	Teams 2
Bronze	Gerry O'Rourke	Athletics	100m A1–A3
Bronze	Gerry O'Rourke	Athletics	800m A1–A3
Bronze	Patrick Kelly	Athletics	800m B1
Bronze	Fintan O'Donnell	Athletics	800m B3
Bronze	Patrick Kelly	Athletics	1500m B1
Bronze	Ronan Rooney	Athletics	Marathon 1B
Bronze	Ireland men	Athletics	4x100m relay C7–C8
Bronze	Joe Mulhall	Athletics	Club throw C3
Bronze	Joe Mulhall	Athletics	Javelin C3
Bronze	Martin Costello	Athletics	Javelin C4
Bronze	John Twomey	Athletics	Discus throw 2
Bronze	Joe Mulhall	Athletics	Shot put C3
Bronze	Francis Genockey	Athletics	Shot put L2
Bronze	David Boland	Athletics	Medicine ball thrust C2
Bronze	Theresa Ward	Athletics	100m C7
Bronze	Rosaleen Galagher	Athletics	Slalom B1
Bronze	Alison Barnes	Athletics	Slalom C1
Bronze	Monica O'Kelly	Athletics	Slalom (leg) C2
Bronze	Jennifer Kiely	Athletics	Slalom C3
Bronze	Rosaleen Galagher	Athletics	Discus B1
Bronze	Monica O'Kelly	Athletics	Club throw C2
Bronze	Christina Dodrill	Athletics	Shot put 2
Bronze	Monica O'Kelly	Athletics	Shot put C2
Bronze	Jennifer Kiely	Athletics	Shot put C3
Bronze	Gerard Dunne	Swimming	100m freestyle 6
Bronze	Brendan Crean	Swimming	25m backstroke C3
Bronze	O. Rourke	Table tennis	Singles L2
Bronze	Morna Cloonan	Table tennis	Singles C4–C5
Bronze	Angela Hendra	Lawn Bowls	Women's singles paraplegic
Bronze	Alice Bailey; Angela Hendra	Lawn Bowls	Mixed pairs paraplegic

== See also ==
- Ireland at the Paralympics
- Ireland at the 1984 Summer Olympics
