= Ireland at the 1988 Summer Paralympics =

- IPC code: IRL
- NPC: Paralympics Ireland
- Website: www.paralympics.ie

in Seoul
- Competitors: 53
- Medals Ranked 19th: Gold 13 Silver 11 Bronze 18 Total 42

Summer Paralympics appearances (overview)
- 1960; 1964; 1968; 1972; 1976; 1980; 1984; 1988; 1992; 1996; 2000; 2004; 2008; 2012; 2016; 2020; 2024

Ireland competed at the 1988 Summer Paralympics in Seoul, South Korea. 53 competitors from Ireland won 42 medals including 13 gold, 11 silver and 18 bronze and finished 19th in the medal table.

Medal	Name	Sport	Event
Gold	John Twomey	Athletics	Discus throw 2
Gold	Ronan Tynan	Athletics	Discus throw A3/A9
Gold	Paul Cassin	Athletics	Discus throw C3
Gold	Martin Costello	Athletics	Shot put C3
Gold	Michael McCormack	Athletics	Kick ball C2
Gold	Darrin Jordan	Athletics	Slalom C2
Gold	Theresa Ward	Athletics	100 m C7
Gold	Alma Rock	Athletics	100 m C8
Gold	Darrin Jordan Lorraine Gallagher Martin Costello David Boland	Athletics	4×100 m relay C2–3
Gold	Thomas Leahy	Boccia	Mixed individual C2
Gold	Teresa Mullen	Lawn Bowls	Women's singles 2–6
Gold	Gerard Dunne	Swimming	100 m backstroke 6
Gold	Gerard Dunne	Swimming	100 m butterfly 6
Silver	Darrin Jordan	Athletics	200m C2
Silver	John McGuinness	Athletics	1500 m C8
Silver	Ronan Tynan	Athletics	Shot put A3/A9
Silver	Lorraine Gallagher	Athletics	Club throw C3
Silver	Ronan Tynan	Athletics	Shot put C2
Silver	Cathy Dunne-Fitzpatrick	Athletics	Discus throw 3
Silver	Lorraine Gallagher	Athletics	Discus throw C3
Silver	Theresa Ward	Athletics	Javelin throw C7
Silver	Christina Dodrill	Athletics	Shot put 2
Silver	William Behan Francis Bell	Lawn Bowls	Men's pairs 2–6
Silver	Michael White	Snooker	Men Open
Bronze	Darrin Jordan	Athletics	100m C2
Bronze	Darrin Jordan	Athletics	400m C2
Bronze	John McGuinness	Athletics	5000 m XC C8
Bronze	Thomas Leahy	Athletics	Club throw C2
Bronze	Ronan Tynan	Athletics	Javelin throw A3/A9
Bronze	Gerard Naughton	Athletics	Shot put C4
Bronze	David Boland	Athletics	Kick ball C2
Bronze	Cathy Dunne-Fitzpatrick	Athletics	Pentathlon 3
Bronze	Camilla McMahon	Athletics	100 m C8
Bronze	Kay McShane	Athletics	800 m 4
Bronze	Christina Dodrill	Athletics	Discus throw 2
Bronze	Kay McShane	Athletics	Marathon 4
Bronze	Peter Alexander Alan Ball Paul Cassin Carlos Keating Patrick Kelly James Leisk Danny McCarthy John McGuinness David McNally Anthony Nolan Sean Plummer	7-a-side Football	Men
Bronze	Gerard Dunne	Swimming	100 m freestyle 6
Bronze	Gerard Dunne	Swimming	400 m freestyle 6
Bronze	Gerard Dunne	Swimming	200 m individual medley 6
Bronze	Sean McGrath	Swimming	100 m breaststroke A4
Bronze	Ireland	Table Tennis	Teams C5–C8

== See also ==
- Ireland at the Paralympics
- Ireland at the 1988 Summer Olympics
