= Ireland at the 2020 Summer Paralympics =

- IPC code: IRL
- NPC: Paralympics Ireland
- Website: paralympics.ie

in Tokyo
- Competitors: 31 in 10 sports
- Flag bearers: Britney Arendse and Jordan Lee
- Medals: Gold 4 Silver 2 Bronze 1 Total 7

Summer Paralympics appearances (overview)
- 1960; 1964; 1968; 1972; 1976; 1980; 1984; 1988; 1992; 1996; 2000; 2004; 2008; 2012; 2016; 2020; 2024

Ireland competed at the 2020 Summer Paralympics in Tokyo, Japan, from 24 August to 5 September 2021.

== Medalists ==
Medal	Name	Sport	Event	Date
Gold	Ellen Keane	Swimming	Women's 100 metre breaststroke SB8	26 August
Gold	Jason Smyth	Athletics	Men's 100 metres T13	29 August
Gold	Katie-George Dunlevy; Guide: Eve McCrystal	Cycling	Women's road time trial B	31 August
Gold	Katie-George Dunlevy; Guide: Eve McCrystal	Cycling	Women's road race B	3 September
Silver	Katie-George Dunlevy; Pilot: Eve McCrystal	Cycling	Women's individual pursuit B	28 August
Silver	Nicole Turner	Swimming	Women's 50 metre butterfly S6	30 August
Bronze	Gary O'Reilly	Cycling	Men's road time trial H5	31 August

== Archery ==
Women's individual

Athlete	Event	Ranking round		Round of 32	Round of 16	Quarterfinals	Semifinals	Final / BM	
Athlete	Event	Score	Seed	Opposition Score	Opposition Score	Opposition Score	Opposition Score	Opposition Score	Rank
Kerrie-Louise Leonard	Compound open	657	18	Baliyan (IND); W 137-141	Artakhinova (RPC); L 131-141	Did not advance			

== Athletics ==
Men's track

Athlete	Event	Heats		Final	
Athlete	Event	Result	Rank	Result	Rank
Michael McKillop	1500 m T38			4:27.69	8
Patrick Monahan	Marathon T54	—		1:32:54	12
Jason Smyth	100 m T13	10.74	1 Q	10.53	1st place, gold medalist(s)

Women's track

Athlete	Event	Heats		Final	
Athlete	Event	Result	Rank	Result	Rank
Orla Comerford	100 m T13	12.87	13	Did not advance	
Greta Štreimikytė	1500 m T13	4:45.98	2 Q	4:34.82	5

Men's field

Athlete	Event	Result	Rank
Jordan Lee	High jump T47	1.74 m	9

Women's field

Athlete	Event	Result	Rank
Mary Fitzgerald	Shot put F40	7.79m	6
Niamh McCarthy	Discus throw F41	28.94 m	5

== Cycling ==
Ireland are sending 4 male and 3 female cyclists to the Paralympics. The 4 men are the pair of Martin Gordon & Eamon Brynes, Ronan Grimes and Gary O' Reilly. The 3 women are the pair of Katie-George Dunlevy & Eve McCrystal and Richael Timothy.

Men's road

Athlete	Event	Time	Rank
Martin Gordon	Road race B	DNS	
Martin Gordon	Time trial B	WD	
Ronan Grimes	Road race C4–5	2:29:21	11
Ronan Grimes	Time trial C4–5	47:40.06	6
Gary O'Reilly	Road race H5	2:24:57	5
Gary O'Reilly	Time trial H5	39:36.46	3rd place, bronze medalist(s)

Women's road

Athlete	Event	Time	Rank
Katie-George Dunlevy	Road race B	2:35:53	1st place, gold medalist(s)
Katie-George Dunlevy	Road time trial B	47:32.07	1st place, gold medalist(s)
Richael Timothy	Road race C1–3	1:21:22	11
Richael Timothy	Time trial C1–3	30:55.24	14

Men's track

Athlete	Event	Qualification		Final	
Athlete	Event	Time	Rank	Opposition Time	Rank
Martin Gordon	Time trial B	—		1:01.545	5
Ronan Grimes	Individual pursuit C4	4:37.693	4 Q	4:37.001	4 L
Ronan Grimes	Time trial C4–5	—		52.163	15

Women's track

Athlete	Event	Qualification		Final	
Athlete	Event	Time	Rank	Opposition Time	Rank
Katie-George Dunlevy	Individual pursuit B	3:19.946	2 Q	3:21.505	2nd place, silver medalist(s)
Katie-George Dunlevy	Time trial B	—		1:09.044	6
Richael Timothy	Individual pursuit C1–3	4:11.699	9	Did not advance	
Richael Timothy	Time trial C1–3	—		42.368	10

== Equestrian ==
Ireland are sending 4 para dressage competitors over to the Paralympics. The 4 riders are Tamsin Addison with her horse Fahrenheit 212, Rosemary Gaffney with her horse Werona, Michael Murphy with his horse Cleverboy and Kate Kerr Horan with her horse Serafina T.

Individual

Athlete	Horse	Event	Total	
Athlete	Horse	Event	Score	Rank
Tamsin Addison	Fahrenheit	Individual championship test grade V	66.452	12th
Rosemary Jean Gaffney	Werona	Individual championship test grade IV	65.390	15th
Kate Kerr-Horan	Serafina T	Individual championship test grade III	56.470	18th
Michael Murphy	Cleverboy	Individual championship test grade I	61.429	18th

Team

Athlete	Horse	Event	Individual score			Total	
Athlete	Horse	Event	TT	CT	Total	Score	Rank
See Above		Team				207.176	12th

* Indicates the three best individual scores that count towards the team total.

== Paracanoeing ==
Men

Athlete	Event	Heats		Semifinal		Final	
Athlete	Event	Time	Rank	Time	Rank	Time	Rank
Patrick O'Leary	Men's KL3	43.502	5th	42.203	4th	42.416	9th
Patrick O'Leary	Men's VL3	54.470	5th	51.939	3rd	52.910	5th

== Powerlifting ==
Women

Athlete	Event	Total lifted	Rank
Britney Arendse	Women's −73 kg	107 kg	7

== Shooting ==
Ireland entered one athlete into the Paralympic competition. Phil Eaglesham won Paralympic qualification at the 2019 WSPS World Championships which was held in Sydney, Australia.

Athlete	Event	Qualification		Final	
Athlete	Event	Score	Rank	Score	Rank
Phil Eaglesham	Mixed 10-metre air rifle standing SH2	626.6	14	Did not advance	

== Swimming ==
Five Irish swimmers qualified after breaking the MQS (Minimum Qualification Standard).

Men

Athlete	Event	Heats		Final	
Athlete	Event	Result	Rank	Result	Rank
Patrick Flanagan	Men's 400 metre freestyle S6	5:40.48	12	Did not advance	
Patrick Flanagan	Men's 100-metre backstroke S6	1:26.81	17	Did not advance	
Barry McClements	Men's 400-metre freestyle S9	4:27.11	9	Did not advance	
Barry McClements	Men's 100-metre backstroke S9	1:06.31	8 Q	1:05.76	7
Barry McClements	Men's 100-metre butterfly S9	1:02.83	10	Did not advance	
Barry McClements	Men's 200-metre individual medley SM9	2:29.68	9	Did not advance	

Women

Athlete	Event	Heats		Final	
Athlete	Event	Result	Rank	Result	Rank
Ellen Keane	Women's 100m breaststroke SB8	1:21.71	1 Q	1:19.93	1st place, gold medalist(s)
Ellen Keane	Women's 200 metre individual medley SM9	2:40.99	7 Q	2:38.64	5
Róisín Ní Ríain	Women's 50 metre freestyle S13	28.88	15	Did not advance	
Róisín Ní Ríain	Women's 400 metre freestyle S13	4:45.14	3 Q	4:44.09	5
Róisín Ní Ríain	Women's 100 metre backstroke S13	1:09.23	3 Q	1:08.61	6
Róisín Ní Ríain	Women's 100 metre breaststroke SB13	1:20.81	5 Q	1:20.34	7
Róisín Ní Ríain	Women's 100 metre butterfly S13	1:08.18	3 Q	1:09.26	8
Róisín Ní Ríain	Women's 200 metre individual medley SM13	2:34.24	5 Q	2:34.12	6
Nicole Turner	Women's 50 metre freestyle S6	35.47	5 Q	35.29	8
Nicole Turner	Women's 100 metre breaststroke SB6	1:40.82	3 Q	1:41.63	7
Nicole Turner	Women's 50 metre butterfly S6	36.54	2 Q	36.30	2nd place, silver medalist(s)

== Table Tennis ==
Men

Athlete	Event	Preliminaries				Round of 16	Quarterfinals	Semifinals	Final / BM	
Athlete	Event	Opposition Result	Opposition Result	Opposition Result	Rank	Opposition Result	Opposition Result	Opposition Result	Opposition Result	Rank
Colin Judge	Individual C3	Zhao (CHN); L 1-3	—	Knaf (BRA); W (w/o)	2 Q	Toporkov (RPC); L 1-3	Did not advance			

== See also ==
- Ireland at the Paralympics
- Ireland at the 2020 Summer Olympics
