= Ireland at the 2024 Summer Paralympics =

- IPC code: IRL
- NPC: Paralympics Ireland
- Website: paralympics.ie

in Paris, France August 28, 2024 – September 8, 2024
- Competitors: 35 in 9 sports
- Flag bearers: Orla Comerford; Colin Judge
- Medals Ranked 55th: Gold 1 Silver 3 Bronze 2 Total 6

Summer Paralympics appearances (overview)
- 1960; 1964; 1968; 1972; 1976; 1980; 1984; 1988; 1992; 1996; 2000; 2004; 2008; 2012; 2016; 2020; 2024

Ireland competed at the 2024 Summer Paralympics in Paris, France, from 28 August to 8 September.

== Medallists ==
Medal	Name	Sport	Event	Date
Gold	Katie-George Dunlevy; Pilot: Linda Kelly	Cycling	Women's road time trial B	4 September
Silver	Róisín Ní Ríain	Swimming	Women's 100 metre backstroke S13	30 August
Silver	Katie-George Dunlevy; Pilot: Eve McCrystal	Cycling	Women's individual pursuit B	1 September
Silver	Katie-George Dunlevy; Pilot: Linda Kelly	Cycling	Women's Road Race B	6 September
Bronze	Róisín Ní Ríain	Swimming	Women's 200 metre individual medley SM13	3 September
Bronze	Orla Comerford	Athletics	Women's 100 metre T13	3 September

=== Multiple medallists ===
Multiple medallists
Name	Sport	1st place, gold medalist(s)	2nd place, silver medalist(s)	3rd place, bronze medalist(s)	Total
Katie-George Dunlevy	Cycling	1	2	0	3
Róisín Ní Ríain	Swimming	0	1	1	2

== Competitors ==
The following is the list of number of competitors in the Games.

Sport	Men	Women	Total
Archery	0	1	1
Athletics	1	4	5
Cycling	5	5	10
Equestrian	1	3	4
Rowing	1	1	2
Paratriathlon	0	5	5
Powerlifting	0	1	1
Swimming	2	4	6
Table tennis	1	0	1
Total	11	24	35

Including Guides

== Archery ==
Athlete	Event	Ranking round		Round of 32	Round of 16	Quarterfinals	Semifinals	Finals	
Athlete	Event	Score	Seed	Opposition score	Opposition score	Opposition score	Opposition score	Opposition score	Rank
Kerrie Leonard	Women's compound open	597	21	Zhou (CHN); L 135–140	Did not advance				

== Athletics ==
Irish track and field athletes achieved quota places for the following events based on their results at the 2023 World Championships, 2024 World Championships, or through high performance allocation, as long as they meet the minimum entry standard (MES).

Key

- Note–Ranks given for track events are within the athlete's heat only
- Q = Qualified for the next round
- q = Qualified for the next round as a fastest loser or, in field events, by position without achieving the qualifying target
- DQ = Disqualified
- PR = Paralympic Record
- AR = Area (or continental) Record
- NR = National Record
- SB = Season's Best
- N/A = Round not applicable for the event
- Bye = Athlete not required to compete in round

Track & road events

Athlete	Event	Heat		Final	
Athlete	Event	Result	Rank	Result	Rank
Aaron Shorten	Men's 1500 m T20	—		4.02.71	7
Orla Comerford	Women's 100 m T13	12.02	1	11.94	3rd place, bronze medalist(s)
Greta Streimikyte	Women's 1500 m T13	—		4.32.38 AR	4
Shauna Bocquet	Women's 100 m T54	17.00	5	Did Not Advance	
Shauna Bocquet	Women's 1500 m T54	3.35.26	6	Did Not Advance	
Shauna Bocquet	Women's 5000 m T54	12.44.52	9 Q	11:50.85	8

Field events

Athlete	Event	Final	
Athlete	Event	Result	Rank
Mary Fitzgerald	Women's shot put F40	7.64	8

== Cycling ==
Ireland entered 6 para-cyclists (three men, three women) after finished the top eligible nation's at the 2022 UCI Nation's ranking allocation ranking.

Track

Athlete	Event	Qualification		Final	
Athlete	Event	Time	Rank	Opposition Time	Rank
Katie-George Dunlevy; Pilot: Eve McCrystal	Women's B 1000m Time Trial	1.09.094	5	1.09.447	5
Katie-George Dunlevy; Pilot: Eve McCrystal	Women's B 3000m Pursuit	3.20.481	2	3.21.315	2nd place, silver medalist(s)
Josephine Healion; Pilot: Linda Kelly	Women's B 1000m Time Trial	1.10.808	7	Did not advance	
Josephine Healion; Pilot: Linda Kelly	Women's B 3000m Pursuit	3:27.425	5	Did not advance	
Martin Gordon; Pilot: Eoin Mullen	B Men's 4000M Pursuit	5.27.642	12	Did not advance	
Martin Gordon; Pilot: Eoin Mullen	B Men's 1000m Time Trial	1.01.158	5	1.01.520	5
Ronan Grimes	C4-5 1000m Time Trial	1:06.411	8	Did not advance	
Ronan Grimes	C4-5 4000m Mens Individual Pursuit	4:28.859	5	Did not advance	
Richael Timothy	C1-3 3000m Women's Individual Pursuit	4.05.247	7	Did not advance	
Richael Timothy	C1-13 500m Women's Time Trial	41.937	10	Did not advance	
Damian Vereker; Pilot: Mitchel McLaughlin	B4 Men's 4000M Pursuit	4.14.826	7	Did not advance	
Damian Vereker; Pilot: Mitchel McLaughlin	B Men's 1000m Time Trial	1.06.740	10	Did not advance	

Road

Athlete	Event	Time	Rank
Damian Vereker; Pilot: Mitchel McLaughlin	B Men's Time Trial	36:31.09	7
Damian Vereker; Pilot: Mitchel McLaughlin	B Men's Road Race	3:04:18	8
Josephine Healion; Pilot: Eve McCrystal	B Women's Road Race	2:42:05	4
Josephine Healion; Pilot: Eve McCrystal	B Women's Time Trial	41:57.61	5
Katie-George Dunlevy; Pilot: Linda Kelly	B Women's Road Race	2.37.26	2nd place, silver medalist(s)
Katie-George Dunlevy; Pilot: Linda Kelly	B Women's Time Trial	38:16.58	1st place, gold medalist(s)
Richael Timothy	C1-3 Women's Individual Time Trial	24:32.40	12
Richael Timothy	C1-3 Women's Individual Road Race	1:48.64	11
Ronan Grimes	C4 Men's Individual Time Trial	39:01.83	8
Ronan Grimes	C4-5 Men's Individual Road Race	2:51:20	17

== Equestrian ==
Ireland entered a full squad of four para-equestrians into the Paralympic equestrian competition, by getting the re-allocation of top African teams, through final world para dressage rankings.

Sarah Slattery originally finished 9th but qualified after a withdrawal

Individual

Athlete	Horse	Event	Qualifier		Final	
Athlete	Horse	Event	Score	Rank	Score	Rank
Sarah Slattery	Savona	Individual championship test grade V	68.410	9 Q	71.795	7
Jessica McKenna	Davidoff	Individual championship test grade III	65.033	10	Did Not Advance	
Kate Kerr-Horan	Serafina	Individual championship test grade III	65.867	9	Did Not Advance	
Michael Murphy	Clerverboy	Individual championship test grade I	70.417	9	Did Not Advance	

Team

Athlete	Horse	Event	Individual score	Total	
Athlete	Horse	Event	TT	Score	Rank
Sarah Slattery	See above	Team	68.895	208.545	10
Kate Kerr-Horan	See above	Team	66.567	208.545	10
Michael Murphy	See above	Team	73.083	208.545	10

* Indicates the three best individual scores that count towards the team total.

== Paratriathlon ==
Athlete	Event	Time	Rank
Cassie Cava	Women's PTS4	1.37.29	12
Chloe MacCombe Guide Catherine Sands	Women's PTVI 3	1.10.32	6
Judith MacCombe Guide Eimear Nicholls	Women's PTVI 3	1.11.17	8

== Powerlifting ==
Athlete	Event	R1	R2	R3	Total Lifted	Rank
Britney Arendse	Women's 73kg	129 kg	131 kg	133 kg	393 kg	4

== Rowing ==
Irish rowers qualified boats in each of the following classes at the 2023 World Rowing Championships in Belgrade, Serbia.

Athlete	Event	Heats		Repechage		Final	
Athlete	Event	Time	Rank	Time	Rank	Time	Rank
Kate O'Brien; Tiarnán O'Donnell	PR2 mixed double sculls	9.03.33	4 R	8:40.85	4 FB	8:50.16	8

== Swimming ==
Ireland secured two quotas at the 2023 World Para Swimming Championships after finishing in the top two places in Paralympic class disciplines.

Men

Athlete	Event	Heats		Final	
Athlete	Event	Result	Rank	Result	Rank
Deaton Registe	Men's 100 m breastroke SB14	1.08.49	5 Q	1.07..82	6
Barry McClements	Men's 100 m backstroke S9	1.05.36	4 Q	1.05.56	8
Barry McClements	Men's 100 m butterfly S9	1:01.85	3 Q		5

Women

Athlete	Event	Heats		Final	
Athlete	Event	Result	Rank	Result	Rank
Ellen Keane	Women's 100 m breaststroke SB8	1.24.59	=1 Q	1.24.69	4
Ellen Keane	Women's 100 m backstroke S9	1:17.63	6	Did not advance	
Róisín Ní Ríain	Women's 100 m butterfly S13	1.06.40	5 Q	1.06.04	4
Róisín Ní Ríain	Women's 100 m backstroke S13	—		1.07.27	2nd place, silver medalist(s)
Róisín Ní Ríain	Women's 200 m IM SM13	2.30.75	2 Q	2.27.47	3rd place, bronze medalist(s)
Róisín Ní Ríain	Women's 100 m breaststroke S13	1:19.05	2 Q	1:19.16	4
Nicole Turner	Women's 50 m freestyle S6	35.35	5 Q	35.65	6
Nicole Turner	Women's 50 m butterfly S6	38.10	3	38.59	6
Dearbhaile Brady	Women's 50 m freestyle S6	36.45	10	Did not advance	
Dearbhaile Brady	Women's 50 m butterfly S6	38.73	4	37.67	5

== Table tennis ==
Ireland entered one athlete for the Paralympic games. Colin Judge qualified for the games through the allocations of the final ITTF world ranking.

Athlete	Event	Round of 16	Quarterfinals	Semifinals	Final / BM	
Athlete	Event	Opposition Result	Opposition Result	Opposition Result	Opposition Result	Rank
Colin Judge	Men's individual C3	Panfeng (CHN)3-0 L	Did Not Advance			

== See also ==
- Ireland at the 2024 Summer Olympics
- Ireland at the Paralympics
