= Ireland at the 1960 Summer Paralympics =

- IPC code: IRL
- NPC: Paralympics Ireland
- Website: www.paralympics.ie

in Rome
- Competitors: 5
- Medals Ranked 12th: Gold 2 Silver 0 Bronze 0 Total 2

Summer Paralympics appearances (overview)
- 1960; 1964; 1968; 1972; 1976; 1980; 1984; 1988; 1992; 1996; 2000; 2004; 2008; 2012; 2016; 2020; 2024

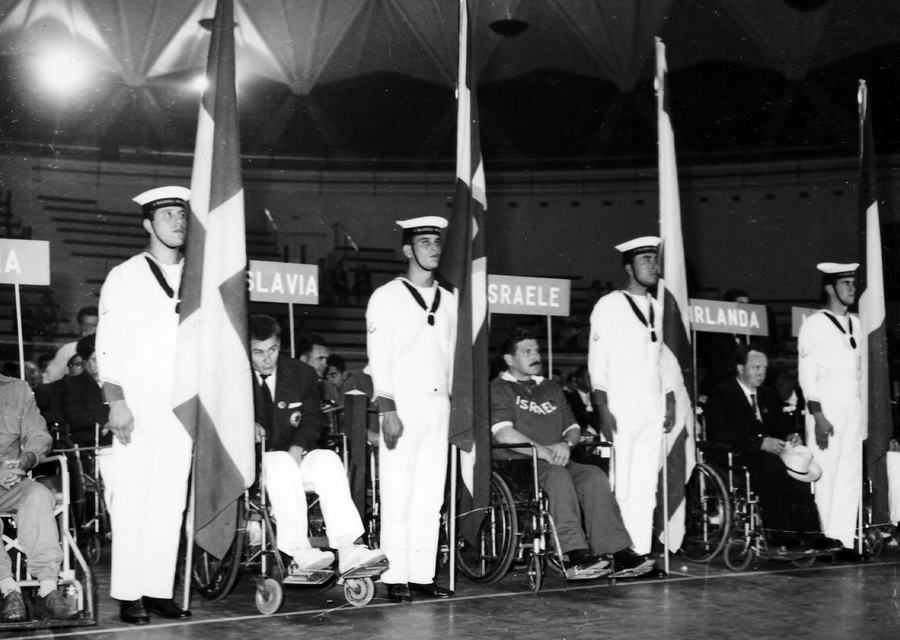
Closing ceremony of Rome 1960

Ireland participated in the inaugural Paralympic Games in 1960 in Rome, Italy. The 1960 Paralympics, now considered to have been the first Paralympic Games, were initially known as the ninth Stoke Mandeville Games, Games for athletes with disabilities founded in Great Britain in 1948.

Ireland were one of 23 nations to enter athletes and the team of five athletes finished 12th in the medals table, winning two gold medals. Both of Ireland's gold medals were won by Joan Horan. Horan won her medals in two different sports, one in women's St. Nicholas Round open archery and one in the women's 25 m Crawl complete class 2 swimming event.

== Medalists ==
Medal	Name	Sport	Event
Gold	Joan Horan	Archery	Women's St. Nicholas round open
Gold	Joan Horan	Swimming	Women's 25 m crawl complete class 2

== See also ==
- Ireland at the 1960 Summer Olympics
