= Archery at the 1960 Summer Paralympics – Women's St. Nicholas round open =

Women's St. Nicholas round open at the I Paralympic Games
- Paralympic Archery
- Competitors: 3 from 3 nations

Medalists
1st place, gold medalist(s)		Joan Horan	Ireland
2nd place, silver medalist(s)		Daphne Ceeney	Australia
3rd place, bronze medalist(s)		Zander	Germany

The Women's St. Nicholas round open was one of the events held in archery at the 1960 Summer Paralympics in Rome.

There were only three competitors. Ireland's Joan Horan took a 12-point lead over Australia's Daphne Ceeney to win gold, while Germany's Zander (full name not recorded) finished third to take bronze.

Rank	Athlete	Score
1st place, gold medalist(s)	Joan Horan (IRL)	481
2nd place, silver medalist(s)	Daphne Ceeney (AUS)	469
3rd place, bronze medalist(s)	Zander (GER)	412
