= Ireland at the 1964 Summer Paralympics =

- IPC code: IRL
- NPC: Paralympics Ireland
- Website: www.paralympics.ie

in Tokyo
- Competitors: 2
- Medals Ranked 18 - 19th: Gold 0 Silver 0 Bronze 0 Total 0

Summer Paralympics appearances (overview)
- 1960; 1964; 1968; 1972; 1976; 1980; 1984; 1988; 1992; 1996; 2000; 2004; 2008; 2012; 2016; 2020; 2024

Ireland competed at the 1964 Summer Paralympics in Tokyo, Japan. They did not win any medals and remains as the only paralympics summer games where Ireland did not win a medal.
