= Ireland at the 1980 Summer Paralympics =

- IPC code: IRL
- NPC: Paralympics Ireland
- Website: www.paralympics.ie

in Arnhem
- Competitors: 24
- Medals Ranked 25th: Gold 4 Silver 2 Bronze 11 Total 17

Summer Paralympics appearances (overview)
- 1960; 1964; 1968; 1972; 1976; 1980; 1984; 1988; 1992; 1996; 2000; 2004; 2008; 2012; 2016; 2020; 2024

Ireland competed at the 1980 Summer Paralympics in Arnhem, Netherlands. 24 competitors from Ireland won 17 medals including 4 gold, 2 silver and 11 bronze and finished 25th in the medal table.

== See also ==
- Ireland at the Paralympics
- Ireland at the 1980 Summer Olympics
