= Ireland at the 1992 Summer Paralympics =

- IPC code: IRL
- NPC: Paralympics Ireland
- Website: www.paralympics.ie

in Barcelona
- Competitors: 58
- Medals Ranked 47th: Gold 0 Silver 3 Bronze 4 Total 7

Summer Paralympics appearances (overview)
- 1960; 1964; 1968; 1972; 1976; 1980; 1984; 1988; 1992; 1996; 2000; 2004; 2008; 2012; 2016; 2020; 2024

Ireland competed at the 1992 Summer Paralympics in Barcelona, Spain. 58 competitors from Ireland won 7 medals including 3 silver and 4 bronze and finished 43rd in the medal table.

== See also ==
- Ireland at the Paralympics
- Ireland at the 1992 Summer Olympics
