= Ireland at the 1968 Summer Paralympics =

- IPC code: IRL
- NPC: Paralympics Ireland
- Website: www.paralympics.ie

in Tel Aviv
- Medals Ranked 19th: Gold 0 Silver 4 Bronze 5 Total 9

Summer Paralympics appearances (overview)
- 1960; 1964; 1968; 1972; 1976; 1980; 1984; 1988; 1992; 1996; 2000; 2004; 2008; 2012; 2016; 2020; 2024

Ireland was one of twenty-eight nations to send a delegation to compete at the 1968 Summer Paralympics in Tel Aviv, Israel from November 4 to 13, 1968. The team finished nineteenth in the medal table and won a total of nine medals; four silver and five bronze. Seven Irish athletes competed at the Games, five men and two women. (Note: Data is taken from the International Paralympic Committee website and is based on information contained/sourced in the original hardcopy final results publications. Some information from earlier Paralympic Games (i.e. 1960 – 1984) is incomplete and is missing first names of some athletes)

Rosaleen Gallagher won a medal in four different sports; archery, athletics, swimming and table tennis.

== Disability classifications ==
The Paralympics groups athletes' disabilities into one of five disability categories; amputation, the condition may be congenital or sustained through injury or illness; cerebral palsy; wheelchair athletes, there is often overlap between this and other categories; visual impairment, including blindness; Les autres, any physical disability that does not fall strictly under one of the other categories, for example dwarfism or multiple sclerosis. Each Paralympic sport then has its own classifications, dependent on the specific physical demands of competition. Events are given a code, made of numbers and letters, describing the type of event and classification of the athletes competing.

== Archery ==
One Irish archer competed at the Games. Rosaleen Gallagher took part in the St. Nicholas round cervical for women. One of only two athletes in the event she won a silver medal after being beaten by Ruth Brooks of Great Britain.

== Dartchery ==
The only dartchery event at the Games was the mixed pairs event which took a knockout format. The Irish pair of Kerrigan and Hughes was beaten by Spaniards Llorens and Lorente in the first round.

== Snooker ==
One snooker event was contested at the Games, the men's open event. Jimmy Gibson entered for Ireland. After wins over Keaton of Great Britain and Aroldo Ruschioni of Italy, Gibson faced Britain's Michael Shelton in the final. Shelton defeated Gibson to take gold and the Irishman won the silver medal.

== Swimming ==
Three swimmers competed for Ireland in Tel Aviv. Kerrigan took part in the men's class 2 complete breaststroke and backstroke but did not advance to either final. Ireland's two swimmers in the women's 25 m backstroke class 1 incomplete each won a medal; White won the silver and Rosaleen Gallagher the bronze behind Ingrams of Great Britain who won in a world record time.

== Table tennis ==
Five players entered table tennis singles events and pairs in both the women's A2 doubles and men's C doubles. Jimmy Gibson added a bronze medal in the men's C singles to the silver he won in snooker. In the women's A2 singles Ireland won two medals, silver for White and bronze for Rosaleen Gallagher. White and Gallagher were Ireland's entry in the women's A2 doubles. Four pairs entered the event; the Irish pair lost their first match, against Great Britain, by a score of 2–1 but still won a bronze medal.

== See also ==
- Ireland at the 1968 Summer Olympics
