= Ireland at the 1976 Summer Paralympics =

- IPC code: IRL
- NPC: Paralympics Ireland
- Website: www.paralympics.ie

in Toronto
- Medals Ranked 21st: Gold 4 Silver 10 Bronze 6 Total 20

Summer Paralympics appearances (overview)
- 1960; 1964; 1968; 1972; 1976; 1980; 1984; 1988; 1992; 1996; 2000; 2004; 2008; 2012; 2016; 2020; 2024

Ireland sent a delegation to compete at the 1976 Summer Paralympics in Toronto, Ontario, Canada. Its 19 athletes finished twenty first in the overall medal count.

== See also ==
- 1976 Summer Paralympics
- Ireland at the 1976 Summer Olympics
