= Eaglesham (disambiguation) =

Eaglesham is a village and parish in Renfrewshire, Scotland.

Eaglesham may also refer to:

== People ==
- Dale Eaglesham (born 1962), Canadian comic book illustrator
- Graeme Eaglesham (born 1989), Scottish footballer
- Hugh Elliott Eaglesham (1873–1938), Canadian politician and physician
- Philip Eaglesham (born 1982), Irish Paralympic shooter and mental health campaigner

== Places ==
- Eaglesham, Alberta, a hamlet in northern Alberta, Canada
