= Swimming at the 2012 Summer Paralympics – Men's 400 metre freestyle S6 =

Event at the 2012 Summer Paralympics

Men's 400 metre freestyle S6 at the XIV Paralympic Games
- Venue: London Aquatics Centre
- Dates: 1 September 2012
- Competitors: 10 from 9 nations

Medalists
1st place, gold medalist(s)		Darragh McDonald	Ireland
2nd place, silver medalist(s)		Anders Olsson	Sweden
3rd place, bronze medalist(s)		Matthew Whorwood	Great Britain

The men's 400 metre freestyle S6 event at the 2012 Paralympic Games took place on 1 September, at the London Aquatics Centre.

Two heats were held, each with five swimmers. The swimmers with the eight fastest times advanced to the final.

== Heats ==
=== Heat 1 ===
Rank	Lane	Name	Nationality	Time	Notes
1	4	Darragh McDonald	Ireland	5:02.38	Q
2	3	Reagan Wickens	Australia	5:28.56	Q
3	5	Sebastian Iwnanow	Germany	5:33.28	Q
4	6	Daniel Londono	Colombia	5:34.10	Q
5	2	Kyosuke Oyama	Japan	5:39.89	

=== Heat 2 ===
Rank	Lane	Name	Nationality	Time	Notes
1	4	Anders Olsson	Sweden	5:06.90	Q
2	5	Matthew Whorwood	Great Britain	5:17.28	Q
3	2	Swen Michaelis	Germany	5:30.43	Q
4	6	Adriano de Lima	Brazil	5:30.75	Q
5	2	Lorenzo Perez Escalona	Cuba	5:48.86	

== Final ==
Rank	Lane	Name	Nationality	Time	Notes
1st place, gold medalist(s)	4	Darragh McDonald	Ireland	4:55.56	
2nd place, silver medalist(s)	5	Anders Olsson	Sweden	5:03.44	
3rd place, bronze medalist(s)	3	Matthew Whorwood	Great Britain	5:11.59	
4	6	Reagan Wickens	Australia	5:26.67	OC
5	8	Daniel Londono	Colombia	5:29.13	
6	1	Sebastian Iwanow	Germany	5:29.70	
7	7	Adriano de Lima	Brazil	5:33.79	
8	2	Swen Michaelis	Germany	5:37.38	
