= Football 7-a-side at the 1988 Summer Paralympics =

Football 7-a-side at the VIII Paralympic Games

Medalists
1st place, gold medalist(s)		Netherlands	Netherlands
2nd place, silver medalist(s)		Belgium	Belgium
3rd place, bronze medalist(s)		Ireland	Ireland

Paralympic symbol (1988–1994)

Football 7-a-side at the 1988 Summer Paralympics consisted of a men's team event.

== Medal summary ==
Event	Gold	Silver	Bronze
Men	Netherlands (NED) Carlo Dengerink; Rudi Dijkstra; Henk Donkers; Peter Guntlisbergen; Paul Heersink; Wilfred Hennink; Arno de Jong; Hans Karmiggelt; Chris Reinds; Barend Verbeek; Jaap de Vries	Belgium (BEL) Mario de Baene; Gerard Himpe; Frank Keteleer; Marc Lorent; Marcel van Meir; Dirk Musschoot; Hugo van Overmeire Geert Proot; Nick Rondelez; John Wyns	Ireland (IRL) Peter Alexander; Alan Ball; Paul Cassin; Carlos Keating; Patrick Kelly; James Leisk; Danny McCarthy; John McGuinness; David McNally; Anthony Nolan; Sean Plummer

== Results ==
Five countries competed in a round-robin tournament.

Team	Pld	W	D	L	GF	GA	GD	Rank
Netherlands (NED)	4	4	0	0	31	2	+29	1st place, gold medalist(s)
Belgium (BEL)	4	3	0	1	11	5	+6	2nd place, silver medalist(s)
Ireland (IRL)	4	2	0	2	10	5	+5	3rd place, bronze medalist(s)
South Korea (KOR)	4	1	0	3	5	15	-10	4
Australia (AUS)	4	0	0	4	3	33	-30	5

== See also ==
- Football at the 1988 Summer Olympics
