= Cycling at the 2012 Summer Paralympics – Men's road time trial H1 =

Cycling, Men's road time trial H1 at the XIV Paralympic Games
- Venue: Brands Hatch
- Dates: September 5, 2012
- Competitors: 11 from 10 nations

Medalists
1st place, gold medalist(s)		Mark Rohan	Ireland
2nd place, silver medalist(s)		Koby Lion	Israel
3rd place, bronze medalist(s)		Wolfgang Schattauer	Austria

The Men's time trial H1 road cycling event at the 2012 Summer Paralympics took place on September 5 at Brands Hatch. Ten riders from nine different nations competed. The race distance was 16 km.

== Results ==
Rank	Name	Country	Time
1st place, gold medalist(s)	Mark Rohan	Ireland	35:41.54
2nd place, silver medalist(s)	Koby Lion	Israel	35:53.30
3rd place, bronze medalist(s)	Wolfgang Schattauer	Austria	38:02.35
4	Anthony Pedeferri	United States	38:21.23
5	Rodolph Cecillon	France	39:03.74
6	Christoph Etzlstorfer	Austria	39:03.96
7	Christophe Hindricq	Belgium	39:46.68
8	Martin Kovar	Czech Republic	39:56.64
9	Tobias Fankhauser	Switzerland	40:34.38
10	Robert Labbe	Canada	44:47.70
10	Rastislav Turecek	Slovakia	49:17.15
