= Philip Eaglesham =

Irish sport shooter (born 1981)

Phil Eaglesham (born 26 October 1981 in Dungannon, County Tyrone, Northern Ireland) is an Irish former Royal Marine commando, a Paralympic sport shooter, businessman and mental health campaigner.

Eaglesham served as a Corporal with the Royal Marines. Following his third tour of duty in Helmand, Afghanistan in 2010, he was diagnosed with Q fever, which left him with chronic disabilities. In 2016, he successfully sued the UK Ministry of Defence for compensation. Eaglesham was introduced to Para Shooting in 2012 and with the support of Help for Heroes, he went on to represent Ireland in Paralympic competitions.

== Sporting career ==
Eaglesham competed in the IPC Shooting World Cup of 2016 in the United Arab Emirates, and competed for Ireland at the Paralympic Games in Rio 2016 in the Mixed 10 m Air Rifle Prone class SH2. In 2017, he competed in the World Shooting Para Sport World Cup in Bangkok. In 2018, he competed in the World Shooting Para Sport Championships in Cheongju, South Korea, taking part in the Mixed 10m Air Rifle standing, Mixed 10m Air Rifle prone and Mixed 50m Rifle prone events. Also in 2018, he won a silver medal in the US Nationals held at Fort Benning in Georgia. In 2019, he won the bronze medal in the SH2 50m rifle prone class at the World Championships in Sydney, Australia, winning Ireland's first ever World Championship medal in Para Shooting, and qualifying him for the 2020 Tokyo Paralympics.

== Personal life ==
Eaglesham is married to Julie: the couple has three sons, Travis, Tyler and Mason. The family lives in Taunton, Somerset.

He is the founder and project manager of Victor Mobility, based in Exeter, Devon, specialising in elevated wheelchair design. He won the Institution of Engineering Designers (IED) Alex Moulton Award 2018 for product innovation.

Eaglesham has campaigned for mental health awareness, shaving off his beard and using the hashtag #PhilsBeard to highlight the issue. He is a supporter of the Royal Family's ‘’Heads Together’’ campaign.
