= Cycling at the 2016 Summer Paralympics – Men's road time trial C2 =

Cycling, Men's road time trial C2 at the XV Paralympic Games
- Venue: Flamengo Park
- Dates: 14 September
- Competitors: 15 from 15 nations

Medalists
1st place, gold medalist(s)		Tristen Chernove	Canada
2nd place, silver medalist(s)		Colin Lynch	Ireland
3rd place, bronze medalist(s)		Liang Guihua	China

The Men's time trial C2 road cycling event at the 2016 Summer Paralympics took place on 14 September at Flamengo Park, Pontal. Thirteen riders from 13 nations competed.

The C2 category is for cyclists with upper or lower limb impairments and moderate to severe neurological dysfunction.

== Results ==
Rank	Name	Nationality	Time
1st place, gold medalist(s)	Tristen Chernove	Canada	27:43.16
2nd place, silver medalist(s)	Colin Lynch	Ireland	28:02.25
3rd place, bronze medalist(s)	Liang Guihua	China	28:17.77
4	Maurice Far Eckhard Tió	Spain	28:22.17
5	Ivo Koblasa	Czech Republic	28:49.88
6	Israel Hilario Rimas	Peru	28:55.08
7	Louis Rolfe	Great Britain	29:12.16
8	Cirio de Jesús Molina	Venezuela	29:13.40
9	Álvaro Galvis Becerra	Colombia	29:44.63
10	Roger Bolliger	Switzerland	30:13.73
11	Craig Ridgard	South Africa	30:19.03
12	Telmo Pinão	Portugal	30:38.04
13	Shota Kawamoto	Japan	32:25.97
14	Attila Olah	Romania	33:20.80
15	Mumuni Alem	Ghana	36:10.85
