= Cycling at the 2016 Summer Paralympics – Men's individual pursuit C3 =

Men's individual pursuit C3 at the XV Paralympic Games
- Venue: Rio Olympic Velodrome
- Dates: 8 September
- Competitors: 10 from 9 nations

Medalists
1st place, gold medalist(s)		David Nicholas	Australia
2nd place, silver medalist(s)		Joseph Berenyi	United States
3rd place, bronze medalist(s)		Eoghan Clifford	Ireland

The men's individual pursuit C3 took place on 8 September 2016.

The event began with a qualifying race over 3000 m. Each of the athletes competed individually in a time-trial basis. The fastest two riders raced for the gold medal and the third- and fourth-fastest riders raced for the bronze.

== Preliminaries ==
Q: Qualifier for Gold medal final
Qb: Qualifier for Bronze medal final
WR: World Record
PR: Paralympic Record

Men's individual Pursuit C3 - Preliminaries
Rank	Name	Nationality	Time	Avg. Speed	Notes
1	David Nicholas	Australia	3:32.336	50.862	Q PR
2	Joseph Berenyi	United States	3:34.394	50.374	Q
3	Michael Sametz	Canada	3:38.459	49.437	Qb
4	Eoghan Clifford	Ireland	3:38.863	49.345	Qb
5	Masaki Fujita	Japan	3:39.142	49.283	
6	Eduardo Santas Asensio	Spain	3:45.398	47.915	
7	Kris Bosmans	Belgium	3:48.308	47.304	
8	Esneider Munoz Marin	Colombia	3:50.319	46.891	
9	Diederick Schelfhout	Belgium	3:55.645	45.831	
10	Yongsik Jin	South Korea	3:59.070	45.175	

== Finals ==
Men's individual Pursuit C3 - Medal Finals
Gold Final
Rank	Name	Nationality	Result	Avg Speed
1st place, gold medalist(s)	David Nicholas	Australia	3:33.028	50.697
2nd place, silver medalist(s)	Joseph Berenyi	United States	3:34.042	50.457
Bronze Final
Rank	Name	Nationality	Result	Avg Speed
3rd place, bronze medalist(s)	Eoghan Clifford	Ireland	3:40.201	49.406
4	Michael Sametz	Canada	3:41.590	48.738
