= Cycling at the 2012 Summer Paralympics – Men's road race H1 =

Cycling, Men's road race H1 at the XIV Paralympic Games
- Venue: Brands Hatch
- Dates: September 7, 2012
- Competitors: 10 from 9 nations

Medalists
1st place, gold medalist(s)		Mark Rohan	Ireland
2nd place, silver medalist(s)		Tobias Fankhauser	Switzerland
3rd place, bronze medalist(s)		Wolfgang Schattauer	Austria

The Men's road race H1 cycling event at the 2012 Summer Paralympics took place on September 7 at Brands Hatch. Ten riders from nine different nations competed. The race distance was 48 km.

== Results ==
LAP=Lapped (8 km).

Rank	Name	Country	Time
1st place, gold medalist(s)	Mark Rohan	Ireland	1:53:09
2nd place, silver medalist(s)	Tobias Fankhauser	Switzerland	1:53:11
3rd place, bronze medalist(s)	Wolfgang Schattauer	Austria	1:53:24
4	Christophe Hindricq	Belgium	1:55:06
5	Anthony Pedeferri	United States	1:59:40
6	Robert Labbe	Canada	1:59:44
7	Martin Kovar	Czech Republic	2:01:20
8	Christoph Etzlstorfer	Austria	2:04:56
	Koby Lion	Israel	LAP
	Rastislav Turecek	Slovakia	LAP
