= Cycling at the 2016 Summer Paralympics – Men's road time trial C3 =

Cycling, Men's road time trial C3 at the XV Paralympic Games
- Venue: Flamengo Park
- Dates: 14 September
- Competitors: 13 from 13 nations

Medalists
1st place, gold medalist(s)		Eoghan Clifford	Ireland
2nd place, silver medalist(s)		Masaki Fujita	Japan
3rd place, bronze medalist(s)		Michael Sametz	Canada

The Men's time trial C3 road cycling event at the 2016 Summer Paralympics took place on 14 September at Flamengo Park, Pontal. Thirteen riders from thirteen nations competed.

The C3 category is for cyclists with moderate upper or lower limb dysfunctions and includes those with cerebral palsy, limb impairments and amputations.

== Results ==
Rank	Name	Nationality	Time
1st place, gold medalist(s)	Eoghan Clifford	Ireland	38:21.79
2nd place, silver medalist(s)	Masaki Fujita	Japan	39:30.41
3rd place, bronze medalist(s)	Michael Sametz	Canada	39:41.28
4	David Nicholas	Australia	40:15.96
5	Steffen Warias	Germany	40:38.45
6	Joseph Berenyi	United States	41:01.09
7	Fabio Anobile	Italy	41:03.19
8	Fraser Sharp	New Zealand	42:20.07
9	Esneider Muñoz Marín	Colombia	42:38.92
10	Henrik Marvig	Sweden	43:13.13
11	Jin Yong-sik	South Korea	43:25.39
12	Diederick Schelfhout	Belgium	43:53.07
13	Glenn Johansen	Norway	45:47.58
