= Eoghan Clifford =

Irish racing cyclist

Eoghan Clifford Ph.D.
Personal information
- Nationality: Irish
- Born: 26 August 1980 (age 45) Bruff, County Limerick, Ireland

Sport
- Country: Ireland
- Sport: Track and road cycling
- Disability class: C3
Medal record
Representing Ireland
Men's Para-cycling
Summer Paralympics
Gold medal – first place	2016 Rio de Janeiro	Road time trial C3
Bronze medal – third place	2016 Rio de Janeiro	Individual pursuit C3
Road World Championships
Gold medal – first place	2014 Greenville	Road race (C3)
Gold medal – first place	2014 Greenville	Time Trial (C3)
Gold medal – first place	2015 Nottwil	Time trial (C3)
Track World Championships
Gold medal – first place	2015 Apeldoorn	Scratch Race (C3)
Bronze medal – third place	2015 Apeldoorn	3km pursuit (C3)
Bronze medal – third place	2016 Montichiari	3km pursuit (C3)
World Cup
Gold medal – first place	2015 Yverdons Les Bains	Time Trial (C3)
Gold medal – first place	2015 Elzach	Time Trial (C3)
Gold medal – first place	2016 Ostende	Time Trial (C3)
Gold medal – first place	2017 Ostende	Time Trial (C3)
Gold medal – first place	2016 Bilbao	Road Race (C3)
Gold medal – first place	2017 Emmen	Road Race(C3)
Silver medal – second place	2016 Ostende	Road Race (C3)
Silver medal – second place	2017 Emmen	Time Trial(C3)
Bronze medal – third place	2015 Elzach	Road Race (C3)
Bronze medal – third place	2015 Yverdons Les Bains	Road Race (C3)

Eoghan Clifford (born 26 August 1980) is an Irish Paralympic racing cyclist competing in C3 classification events. Clifford has represented Ireland at both road and track disciplines and is a multiple UCI Para-cycling World Champion, winning the C3 road race and the C3 time trial in Greenville in 2014, the scratch race at the track world championships in Apeldoorn in 2015 and the time trial event at Nottwil in 2015. He also won a bronze medal at the track world champions for the C3 pursuit in Apeldoorn in 2015 and Montichiari in 2016.

== Early life ==
Clifford was born in 1980 in Dublin and grew up in Bruff, County Limerick. He attended both Primary and Secondary school in Bruff. He cycled back and forth to secondary school daily. He moved to Galway, where he still lives, in 1998 to study at NUI Galway. He graduated with a Bachelor of Engineering (Environmental) in 2002. While at NUI Galway he cultivated an interest in rowing, which he still enjoys.

Clifford lives with Charcot–Marie–Tooth disease, a hereditary motor and sensory neuropathy, but still races at a national level in able-bodied events.

== Career ==
Dr Clifford has worked as a full-time lecturer at NUI Galway since 2010. He has an interest both in Transport Engineering and Water Waste Engineering.

He first entered Ireland's para cycling squad in 2014. The following year he qualified for the 2016 Summer Paralympics in Rio de Janeiro. He brought one gold and one bronze medal back with him.

== Personal life ==
He is married to Magdalena Hajdukiewicz.
