= Margaret Grant (boccia) =

Irish boccia player

Margaret Grant is an Irish boccia player. She won a gold medal at the 2000 Summer Paralympics with John Cronin in the Mixed pairs BC3 boccia event.
