= Mark Rohan =

Irish cyclist

Personal information
- Nickname: Red
- Born: 26 July 1981 (age 45) Ballinahown, County Westmeath
- Height: 1.80 m (5 ft 11 in)

Cycling career
- Sport: Cycling
- Discipline: Road handcycle
- Role: Rider
- Rider type: Time trialist/all-rounder
Medal record
Paralympic Games
Representing Ireland
Road bicycle racing
Gold medal – first place	2012 London	H1 time trial
Gold medal – first place	2012 London	H1 road race

Mark Rohan (born 26 July 1981) is an Irish cyclist, and a former Gaelic football and wheelchair basketball player. He competes in the H1 disability sport classification as he has been paralysed from the chest down since a spinal cord injury in 2001. Rohan won two gold medals in the 2012 Summer Paralympics.

He won a gold medal in the Men's road time trial H1 event and in the Men's road race H1 event.
