= Derek Malone =

Irish Paralympic athlete

Medal record

Paralympic athletics

Representing Ireland

Paralympic Games
Bronze medal – third place	2004 Athens	800 metres - T38

Derek Malone is a paralympic athlete from Ireland competing mainly in category T38 middle-distance events.

Derek competed in the 2000 and 2004 Summer Paralympics. In his first games he competed in the 5000m and 800m before changing to the 800m and 400m in his second games where he won the 800m bronze in the T38 class.
