= Sean O'Grady (athlete) =

Irish Paralympic athlete

Medal record

Paralympic athletics

Representing Ireland

Paralympic Games
Bronze medal – third place	1996 Atlanta	Discus Throw - F54

Sean O'Grady is a paralympic athlete from Ireland competing mainly in category F55 shot put and discus events.

O'Grady competed at four Paralympics: 1988, 1992, 1996 and 2000. In each games he competed in one or more of the shot put and discus events. His only medal came in the F54 discus in the 1996 games, where he won a bronze medal.
