= Joan Horan =

Irish Paralympic athlete (1918–1965)

- Born: Joan Dempsey; 26 February 1918; 7 Merrion Square, Dublin, Ireland
- Died: 9 December 1965 (aged 47); Ardeen Cheshire home, Shillelagh, County Wicklow

Joan Horan (26 February 1918 – 9 December 1965) was an Irish paralympic athlete, and the first Irish woman to compete in the Paralympic Games.

== Early life and family ==
Joan Horan was born Joan Dempsey at 7 Merrion Square, Dublin on 26 February 1918. Her father was Dr Patrick Dempsey, an ear, nose and throat surgeon at the Mater Hospital and Monica Dempsey (née Plunkett). She had one older sister and two older brothers. She attended Alexandra College, Dublin, and St Mary's School Ascot, Berkshire, England. She attended the Central School of Dramatic Art at the Royal Albert Hall, London for 3 years, attaining minor stage and film roles. During the 1940s she acted with the Dublin Players troupe. On 28 October 1941 at the Church of the Sacred Heart in Donnybrook she married Desmond Horan, the only son of Gerald Horan, the Master of the High Court. They had two sons. She later retired from acting.

In 1947, Horan was diagnosed with a cyst on her spine, leading to her being hospitalised for two years at the National Hospital, Queen's Square, London. She was rigidly held lying on her stomach for 6 years, and was paralysed by 1953. She spent a year at Stoke Mandeville, Aylesbury, England, before returning to Ireland, where she was practically living in the Mater Hospital, Dublin. Again, prone on her stomach, Horan wheeled herself around on a modified bed. After a time she eventually moved into a wheelchair.

== Career ==
In the mid-1950s sport became a common rehabilitation therapy for people with spinal injuries, as it was effective in preventing blood and skin issues brought on by long periods of immobilisation. Horan took up archery and table tennis while living at Stoke Mandeville. She returned there to compete with other Irish former patients at the Eighth International Stoke Mandeville Games in 1959, winning two gold medals. Horan was selected to be a member of the team of five paraplegic athletes to take part in the first Paralympics in Rome in 1960. They were sent by the Rehabilitation Institute of Ireland, and Horan was the only woman on the team. She had returned to swimming in the late 1950s, training at the Tara Street swimming pool, which the Dublin Corporation would open an hour early for her sessions. At the time she was living in the Mater Hospital, and was supported by her family and the Knights of Malta.

At the 1960 Rome Paralympics, Horan competed in the St Nicholas round of open women's archery, winning the gold medal. In the class C2 women's twenty-five metre freestyle event she won her second gold medal. Her fellow team mates were Oliver Murphy, Fr Leo Close, Jimmy Levins, and Jack Kerrigan. After the games, she attended an audience with Pope John XXIII and the Irish team travelled to Lourdes for three days before returning to Dublin. The lord mayor of Dublin, Maurice Dockrell, and other dignitaries welcomed the team home. In February 1961, Seán Lemass presented Horan with Caltex Sports Stars Awards in Dublin.

Horan later moved to the new residential home Ardeen Cheshire home, Shillelagh, County Wicklow. In 1961, she again won gold in archery at the Stoke Mandeville Games, and competed again in the 1962 Games. Horan was also an active fundraiser for both the Cheshire Foundation and the Irish Wheelchair Association. She died at the Ardeen Cheshire home from complications arising from her disability on 9 December 1965.
