= John Cronin (boccia) =

Irish boccia player

John Cronin is an Irish boccia player. He won a gold medal alongside Margaret Grant at the 2000 Summer Paralympics in the mixed pairs BC3 boccia event.

== Career ==
Cronin began playing boccia in 1996 and won a bronze medal two years later in the 1998 Boccia World Championships. He also earned two silver medals at the 1999 Boccia World Cup. In the 2000 Summer Paralympics, his first Paralympic Games, Cronin won a gold medal with Margaret Grant in the mixed pairs BC3 boccia event. In the 2002 World Championships in Portugal, Cronin won two bronze medals. He later competed in the mixed pairs BC3 boccia event at the 2004 Summer Paralympics but failed to qualify for a medal. After winning another silver medal at the 2008 Boccia World Cup, Cronin and his partner Steven Valentine won a silver medal at the 2009 Boccia European Championships in Porto, Portugal.
