= Mary Rice (wheelchair racer) =

Irish Paralympic athlete

Medal record

Paralympic athletics

Representing Ireland

Paralympic Games
Silver medal – second place	2000 Sydney	400 metres - T34
Bronze medal – third place	1996 Atlanta	200 metres - T32-33

Mary Rice is a paralympic athlete from Ireland competing mainly in category T34 sprint events.

== Career ==
Rice has competed in the Paralympics on two occasions, firstly in 1996 and then again in 2000.

In the 1996 games, she competed in the 100m and 200m winning a bronze in the 200m. In her second games she won a silver in the 400m as well as competing in the 200m and discus throw. Rice originally won a bronze medal in the 400m race but was upgraded to silver after Deborah Brennan was disqualified.

== Personal life ==
Rice's son Nathan competes in disabled tennis. Her sister Sharon Rice is also a Paralympic athlete.
