= Mairead Berry =

Irish Paralympic swimmer

Personal information
- Born: Coolock, Ireland

Sport
- Country: Ireland
- Sport: Paralympic swimming
- Disability: Cerebral palsy
- Disability class: S2
Medal record
Paralympic swimming
Representing Ireland
Paralympic Games
| Silver medal – second place | 1992 Barcelona | Women's 50m backstroke S2 |
| Silver medal – second place | 1996 Atlanta | Women's 50m backstroke S2 |
| Gold medal – first place | 2000 Sydney | Women's 100m freestyle S2 |
| Silver medal – second place | 2000 Sydney | Women's 50m backstroke S2 |
| Silver medal – second place | 2000 Sydney | Women's 50m freestyle S2 |
World Championships
| Gold medal – first place | 1994 Malta | Women's 50m backstroke S1-2 |
| Silver medal – second place | 1994 Malta | Women's 50m freestyle S1-2 |
| Silver medal – second place | 1998 Christchurch | Women's 50m backstroke S2 |
| Silver medal – second place | 1998 Christchurch | Women's 50m freestyle S2 |
| Silver medal – second place | 1998 Christchurch | Women's 100m freestyle S2 |

Mairead Berry (born 1975) is a former Irish Paralympic swimmer who competed in international level events.

In 2001, Berry officially launched and named a 50,000-ton ship, MV Ulysses at a special ceremony Dublin Port.
