= Michael McKillop =

Irish middle-distance runner

Personal information
- Born: 27 January 1990 (age 36) Ballymena, County Antrim, Northern Ireland

Sport
- Sport: Running
- Disability class: T37, T38
- Events: 800 metres, 1500 metres
- College team: St Malachy's College, Belfast

Achievements and titles
- Personal bests: 800 m: 1:54.40; 1500 m: 3:51.74
Medal record
Representing Ireland
Men's paralympic athletics
Summer Paralympics
Gold medal – first place	2008 Beijing	800 m T37
Gold medal – first place	2012 London	800 m T37
Gold medal – first place	2012 London	1500 m T37
Gold medal – first place	2016 Rio de Janeiro	1500 m T37
IPC Athletics World Championships
Gold medal – first place	2006 Assen	800 m T37
Gold medal – first place	2011 Christchurch	800 m T37
Gold medal – first place	2015 Doha	800 m T38
Gold medal – first place	2015 Doha	1,500 m T37
IPC Athletics European Championships
Gold medal – first place	2014 Swansea	800 m T37
Gold medal – first place	2014 Swansea	1500 m T38

Michael Gerard McKillop MBE (born 27 January 1990 in Ballymena, Northern Ireland) is an Irish middle distance runner. He competes in the T37 disability sport classification, as he has a mild form of cerebral palsy.

He won the 800m title at the 2006 IPC Athletics World Championships, clocking just over 2:02. and he represented Ireland at the 2008 Summer Paralympics, winning a gold medal at the T37 800 m clipping almost three seconds off his previous mark as he strode to an emphatic win in 1:59.41. His time was a Paralympic record. McKillop won the 800 m title at the 2011 IPC Athletics World Championships in world-record time of 1:58.90, he also set a 1500 m world record but was not awarded a medal because of the lack of entries. in the London 2012 Paralympics, McKillop won gold for the men's 800 meter t37 with a time of 1:57.22; this was a world record. He won the 1500m T37 race in the 2012 London Paralympics. The medal was later presented to him by his mother, Catherine McKillop, an ambassador of Procter & Gamble. He defended his 1500m T37 title at the 2016 Rio Paralympics securing the gold medal once again.

He is coached by his father Paddy, who was awarded Northern Ireland Sports Coach of the Year. McKillop has a personal best in his preferred 800 metres of 1:57.22. In 2012, McKillop was awarded the Whang Youn Dai Achievement Award.

McKillop was appointed Member of the Order of the British Empire (MBE) in the 2020 New Year Honours for services to disability awareness and athletics in Northern Ireland.

== Personal life ==
McKillop works as a fitness instructor and motivational speaker. He was inducted into the Suffolk Sports Hall of Fame on Long Island with the Class of 1993.

McKillop also has been diagnosed with epilepsy since 2004 and has spoken publicly about his experiences with the condition.

== See also ==
- 2012 Olympics gold post boxes in the United Kingdom
