= John Twomey (sailor) =

Irish paralympic discus thrower and sailor

Personal information
- Nationality: Irish
- Born: 7 July 1955 (age 70) Ballinhassig, Cork

Sport
- Club: Kinsale Yacht Club
Medal record
Representing Ireland
Paralympic Games
Table Tennis
Silver medal – second place	1980 Arnhem	Table Tennis
Discus
Gold medal – first place	1988 Seoul	Discus
Bronze medal – third place	1984 England	Discus
Sailing

John Twomey (born 7 July 1955) is an Irish Paralympic athlete and sailor. He has represented Ireland at 11 consecutive Paralympic games winning medals at three of them.

== Personal life ==
Born in Cork, Twomey was a local hurler and a competitive cyclist until he was injured in a cycling competition in March 1970 aged just 14. He broke his back and has used a wheelchair since.

== Athlete ==
Twomey became a track and field athlete representing Ireland from 1976 to 1996 at the Paralympics in the discus event. He won both Gold and Bronze medals in Discus and the Silver medal in table tennis. When he retired from athletics the timing was right that he could take up his other sport of Sailing at Olympic level. In 1996 Sailing was a demonstration event at the Paralympics and in 2000 Twomey qualified to represent Ireland in the Sonar.

== Sailor ==
He has been the helmsman in the Mixed Three Person Sonar, a 23-foot two sail keelboat in the 2000 Sydney Games, 2004 Athens Games, 2012 London Games and 2016 Rio Games and the Mixed Two Person SKUD18 in 2008 Beijing Games

At the 2013 ISAF World Championships in Weymouth, he teamed with Ian Costelloe and Austin O’Carroll to win the bronze medal in the Sonar Class. They finished sixth in the Miami event.

Twomey was elected President of the International Association for Disabled Sailing in 2012. He was responsible for helping the IFDS through three major challenges which occurred after that including a court case related to the 2012 Paralympics, the merger of the IFDS and the ISAF as well as the loss of sailing as a paralympic sport in the 2020 Paralympics.

Twomey lead the Ireland team out during the opening ceremony as the national flag bearer of the Rio 2016 Games.
