= Darragh McDonald =

Irish swimmer (born 1994)

Personal information
- Nationality: Irish
- Born: 1994 (age 31–32) Gorey, Ireland
- Height: 1.82 m (6 ft 0 in)
- Weight: 80 kg (176 lb)
- Alma mater: University College Dublin

Sport
- Sport: Swimming
- Strokes: Freestyle
- Club: Asgard Swimming Club
- College team: University College Dublin
Medal record
Men's swimming
Representing Ireland
Paralympic Games
Gold medal – first place	2012 London	400 m freestyle – S6
Silver medal – second place	2008 Beijing	400 m freestyle – S6
IPC World Championships
Gold medal – first place	2013 Montreal	400 m freestyle – S6
Bronze medal – third place	2015 Glasgow	400 m freestyle – S6
IPC European Championships
Silver medal – second place	2009 Reykjavik	100 m freestyle – S6
Silver medal – second place	2009 Reykjavik	400 m freestyle – S6
Bronze medal – third place	2011 Berlin	400 m freestyle – S6

Darragh McDonald (born 1994) is a retired Irish swimmer. He competed in the Beijing 2008 Paralympic Games, winning a silver medal in the 400m Freestyle. He also competed in the 2012 London Paralympic Games finishing first in the 400m Freestyle. He also held the title of world champion after winning the gold medal swim in the 2013 World Championships in Montreal.

McDonald retired from competitive sport in October 2015 after considerable conflict with the Irish Sports Council and Paralympics Ireland.

After graduating from University College Dublin with a degree in commerce, McDonald joined KPMG as a tax trainee in the Irish Office based in Dublin.
