= John McCarthy (discus thrower) =

Irish Paralympic athlete

Medal record

Paralympic athletics

Representing Ireland

Paralympic Games
Silver medal – second place	2004 Athens	Discus Throw - F32/51

John McCarthy is a paralympic athlete from Ireland competing mainly in category F32/51 club throw and discus throw events.

McCarthy competed in the club throw and discus throw at both the 2004 and 2008 Summer Paralympics, winning the silver medal in the discus in 2004.
