= Orla Comerford =

Irish Paralympic athlete

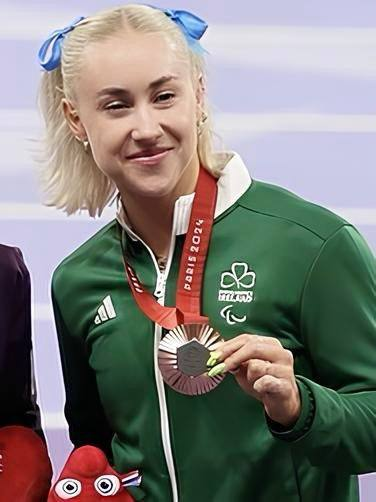
- Comerford at the 2024 Summer Paralympics

Personal information
- Born: 14 September 1997 (age 29) Dublin, Ireland

Sport
- Country: Ireland
- Sport: Paralympic athletics
- Disability: Stargardt's disease
- Disability class: T13
- Events: 100 metres 200 metres
- Club: Raheny Shamrock Athletic Club

Achievements and titles
- Personal bests: 60m (Indoor) 7.52; 100m 11.76; 200m 24.62
Medal record
Women's para athletics
Representing Ireland
Paralympic Games
Bronze medal – third place	2024 Paris	100m T13
World Championships
Gold medal – first place	2025 New Delhi	100m T13
Gold medal – first place	2025 New Delhi	200m T13
European Indoor Championships
Gold medal – first place	2025 Apeldoorn	60m Mixed Classification
European Championships
Bronze medal – third place	2018 Berlin	100m T13
Bronze medal – third place	2018 Berlin	200m T13

Orla Comerford (born 14 September 1997) is an Irish Paralympic athlete who competes in sprinting events at the international level. She has Stargardt's disease, which is an inherited retinal disease. Its main symptom is loss of visual acuity, uncorrectable with glasses.

Comerford won a bronze medal in the 100 metres sprint in the T13 classification at the 2024 Paralympic Games in Paris.

== Career ==
=== 2016 Paralympics ===
At the age of 19, Comerford competed at the 2016 Summer Paralympics in Rio, running in the T13 100m. She finished 8th, qualifying for the final.

=== 2018 ===
At the 2018 European Para Championships in Berlin, she won two bronze medals, in the 200m and 100m events.

=== 2020 Paralympics ===
Comerford finished 13th at the delayed 2020 Paralympics in Tokyo.

=== 2023 ===
Comerford finished 4th at the 2023 World Para Athletics Championships in Paris.

=== 2024 Paralympics ===
Comerford won a bronze medal at the 2024 Summer Paralympics in Paris (the race was won in a World Record time by Lamiya Valiyeva of Azerbaijan).

=== 2025 ===
She won the 60m Mixed Classification race at the 2025 European Indoor Athletics Championships in Apeldoorn.

She set a new 200m personal best of 24.61 at the 2025 Para athletics Paris Grand Prix, a week later she won at the Bislett Games in Oslo at the Oslo Diamond League, posting a new personal best of 11.87.
