= David Malone (swimmer) =

Irish Paralympic swimmer

Sport
- Country: Ireland
- Sport: Paralympic swimming
- Disability: Arthrogryposis
- Disability class: S9
Medal record
Paralympic swimming
Representing Ireland
Paralympic Games
Gold medal – first place	2000 Sydney	100m backstroke S8
Silver medal – second place	1996 Atlanta	100m backstroke S9
Silver medal – second place	2004 Athens	100m backstroke S8
World Championships
Gold medal – first place	1998 Christchurch	100m backstroke S8
Bronze medal – third place	1994 Malta	100m backstroke S9
Bronze medal – third place	2002 Mar del Plata	100m backstroke S8

David Malone is an Irish bi-lateral Paralympic swimmer. He participated in four consecutive Paralympic Games, starting with the 1996 Paralympic Games in Atlanta, Georgia. He won gold at the 2000 Summer Paralympics and held the world record for 100-metre backstroke for ten years. He retired from competition in 2008. He currently is the performance director for Paralympics Ireland.

== Early life ==
Malone is from Dublin, Ireland. He was born with arthrogryposis. His right leg was amputated below the knee when he was seven years old and his left leg amputated above the ankle the next year. He played football and cycled when he was young. He began swimming in the local pool and felt self-conscious about placing his artificial legs next to the pool prior to swimming. He realised the other swimmers were supportive and he began to swim competitively. He competed in a multi-sports competition when he was 15 and won five of the six events he entered.

== Career ==
Malone competed at the 1994 IPC Swimming World Championships in Malta. He won a bronze medal in the S9 100-metre backstroke, and also competed in the S9 100-metre freestyle and the SM9 200-metre individual medley.

=== 1996 Paralympics ===
Malone participated in four consecutive Paralympic Games, starting with the 1996 Paralympic Games in Atlanta, Georgia. He competed in the S9 100-metre backstroke and won a silver medal. Malone won a gold medal in the 1997 and 1999 European Championships. He won a gold medal in the S8 100-metre backstroke at the 1998 IPC Swimming World Championships in Christchurch. He set the S8 100-metre backstroke world record in 1998 with a time of 1:09.28, which stood for ten years.

=== 2000 Paralympics ===
In his second Paralympics in Sydney he competed in the S8 50-metre backstroke, the SM8 200-metre medley, and the S8 100-metre backstroke. In the S8 100-metre backstroke he finished in a dead heat with Holger Kimmig with a time of 1:09.90. They were both awarded a gold medal. After the Games, he trained less and focused on other aspects of his life. The same year he won gold medals at the World Championships and the European Championships. In 2001 he won a silver medal at the European Championships, finishing behind Kimmig. He competed at the 2002 IPC Swimming World Championships and won a bronze medal in the S8 100-metre backstroke.

=== 2004 Paralympics ===
He competed in the S8 100-metre backstroke at the 2004 Paralympics in Athens. He earned his second silver medal with a time of 1:12.55, finishing two seconds behind US Paralympian Travis Mohr.

=== 2008 Paralympics ===
Malone swam the 100-metre backstroke at the 2008 Paralympics in Beijing (S8 classification). He finished fifth in his heat and tenth overall, with a time of 1:16.80. Although it was his best time of the season, he did not qualify for the final heat. He retired from competitive swimming after the conclusion of the Games.

== Post-swimming career ==
Malone worked for Ireland's Paralympic team following his competitive swimming career. In July 2009, he started as Ireland's head of Paralympic swimming. He became the performance director for Paralympics Ireland in 2015. Malone later became the operational lead of their sport department.

In 2013, Malone was inducted into the Swim Ireland Hall of Fame. He was the first person to be inducted into the Irish Paralympic Sports Hall of Fame. Swim Ireland awarded him as Performance Coach of the Year in Para and Diving in 2019.
