= Gabriel Shelly =

Irish Paralympic boccia player

Gabriel Shelly (born in Dublin on 24 October 1968) is an Irish Paralympian. He won gold in Boccia at the 2000 Summer Paralympics and bronze in Boccia at the 2008 Summer Paralympics. He also participated in the 1996, 2004 Games and 2012 Games but did not win medals in those years.
