= Tom Leahy (athlete) =

Irish Paralympian

Medal record

Representing Ireland

Paralympic Games

Men's para athletics (track & field)
Gold medal – first place	1984 Stoke Mandeville / New York	Shot Put - C2
Gold medal – first place	2000 Sydney	Discus Throw - F51
Silver medal – second place	1984 Stoke Mandeville / New York	Club Throw - C2
Silver medal – second place	1988 Seoul	Shot Put - C2
Bronze medal – third place	1988 Seoul	Club Throw - C2

Boccia
Gold medal – first place	1988 Seoul	Mixed Individual - C2
Silver medal – second place	1996 Atlanta	Mixed Team - C1-C2
Bronze medal – third place	1992 Barcelona	Mixed Individual - C2

Tom Leahy is a paralympic athlete from Ireland competing mainly in category BC2 Boccia events and F32 throwing events. Leahy competed in eight Paralympic Games. He won three Paralympic gold medals, three silver medals, and two bronze medals.

== Personal life ==
Tom Leahy is from Ballyhooly in County Cork, Ireland. He is a painter, and his paintings have been featured in children's books, and he has sold his paintings in exhibitions.

== Career ==
=== 1984 Paralympics ===
Leahy has competed in eight Paralympic Games across boccia and athletics winning a total of eight medals. His first Games were the 1984 Summer Paralympics. In the C2 shot put he threw for 9.51 metres, winning the gold medal. He also competed in the C2 club throw, finishing with a result of 18.98 metres. He finished behind and placed second.

=== 1988 Paralympics ===
In the 1988 Summer Paralympics he won a silver in the shot put and a bronze in the club throw. He also won a gold in the individual boccia. He was the first Irish medalist in boccia. He competed with the Irish boccia team that was eliminated in group play.

=== 1992 Paralympics ===
In the 1992 Summer Paralympics he competed on Ireland's C1-C2 mixed team. They advanced to the semifinal round, where they were defeated by the Spanish team 4–3. They lost to the South Korean team in the bronze medal match, so the Irish time originally finished in fourth place. However, during the medal ceremony the South Korean team protested and threw down their medals. They were disqualified and Ireland was awarded the bronze medal.

=== 1996 Paralympics ===
The 1996 Summer Paralympics saw him compete in the team and individual boccia events. In the mixed team C1-C2 competition, Ireland completed pool play with a record of 3–2 and did not advance to the semifinals.

In the C2 mixed individual boccia event, Leahy advanced past the preliminary round pool with a 4–1 record. He made it to the finals and lost to Maria Rodriguez of Spain 9–1. He finished with a silver in the event.

=== 2000 Paralympics ===
In the 2000 Summer Paralympics he returned to the track, competing in the F51 club throw and F51 discus. He originally placed second in discus with a throw of 16.05 metres, but was promoted to a gold medal finish when Polish Paralympian Robert Jachimowicz was disqualified for being entered in the wrong class. His throw set a world record.

He set a personal best in the club throw but did not finish on the podium.

=== 2004 Paralympics ===
He stayed in athletics in 2004 Summer Paralympics, competing in the F32 shot put. He finished in seventh place with a distance of 5.96 metres. His was below his personal and season best of 6.48 metres.

=== 2008 Paralympics ===
He began to train exclusively for boccia due to a hip injury. He competed in the 2008 Summer Paralympics in the BC2 mixed individuals. He was eliminated in the preliminaries and did not advance to the quarterfinals after his performance in Group B. Leahy lost to Dan Bentley and Risa Kainuma on the first day of competition and defeated Fernando Ferreira on the second, finishing with a 1–2 record. He cited his performance to a headache.

After the individual competition, he competed in the BC1-BC2 boccia mixed team event. They defeated Finland and lost to Spain in group play, advancing them to the quarterfinals. They lost to host-nation China 12–2 and were eliminated.

=== 2012 Paralympics ===
Leahy competed in the BC1-2 boccia mixed team event in the 2012 Paralympic Games. On 2 September, The team lost their first match 14–3 against South Korea. Later that day they lost to Brazil 11–2, ending their tournament. He retired after these Games, his eighth Paralympics.
