= Paralympics Ireland =

National Paralympic Committee of Ireland

National Paralympic Committee
- Country: Ireland
- Code: IRL
- Created: 1987
- Continental association: EPC
- Headquarters: Dublin, Ireland
- President: Ms Eimear Breathnach
- Secretary General: Stephen McNamara
- Website: paralympics.ie

Paralympics Ireland (formerly known as the Paralympic Council of Ireland) is the National Paralympic Committee in Ireland for the Paralympic Games movement. It is a non-profit organisation that selects teams, and raises funds to send Irish competitors to Paralympic events organised by the International Paralympic Committee (IPC).

== History ==
The organisation was established the Paralympic Council of Ireland in 1987, as a Coordination Committee for the 1988 Summer Paralympics. They rebranded with a new logo in 2005. The organisation rebranded again in 2011 with a new logo and a name change to Paralympics Ireland. They launched a new tagline, Inspiring Beyond Belief.

Paralympics Ireland coordinates Ireland at the Paralympics and Ireland at the World Championships.

== See also ==
- Olympic Federation of Ireland
