= Portugal at the Paralympics =

- IPC code: POR
- NPC: Portuguese Paralympic Committee
- Website: www.comiteparalimpicoportugal.pt (in Portuguese and English)
- Medals: Gold 27 Silver 31 Bronze 43 Total 101

Summer appearances
- 1972; 1976–1980; 1984; 1988; 1992; 1996; 2000; 2004; 2008; 2012; 2016; 2020; 2024

Portugal made its Paralympic Games début at the 1972 Summer Paralympics (two years before the Carnation Revolution), where it was represented solely by a men's team in wheelchair basketball. They were eliminated at the preliminary stage of the competition, with one victory (over Switzerland) and three defeats. Portugal was then absent from the Paralympic Games until the 1984 Summer Games, where its athletes won the country's first fourteen medals, including three gold in track and field and one in boccia. Portugal has competed at every subsequent edition of the Summer Paralympics, but -almost uniquely among Western European countries- before 2026 it had never taken part in the Winter Games.

Portuguese athletes have won a total of 101 Paralympic medals, of which 27 gold, 31 silver and 43 bronze. The country's best performance came in 2000, when it won 15 medals (of which 6 gold) and ranked 26th.

== Medal tallies ==
=== Summer Paralympics ===
Games	Athletes	Gold	Silver	Bronze	Total	Rank
1972 Heidelberg	11	0	0	0	0	–
1984 New York / Stoke Mandeville	17	4	3	7	14	26
1988 Seoul	13	3	5	6	14	29
1992 Barcelona	30	3	6	2	11	32
1996 Atlanta	35	6	4	4	14	26
2000 Sydney	52	6	5	4	15	26
2004 Athens	29	2	5	5	12	41
2008 Beijing	35	1	4	2	7	42
2012 London	30	0	1	2	3	63
2016 Rio de Janeiro	37	0	0	4	4	73
2020 Tokyo	37	0	0	2	2	77
2024 Paris	27	2	1	4	7	43
Total		27	34	45	106	

=== Winter Paralympics ===
Games	Athletes	Gold	Silver	Bronze	Total	Rank
2026 Milano Cortina	1	0	0	0	0	-
Total		0	0	0	0	

=== Medals by Summer sport ===
Row in gold background is a sport in which they are leading in i.e. won most world championship titles.

Sport	Gold	Silver	Bronze	Total
Athletics	18	16	23	57
Boccia	9	10	8	27
Swimming	0	3	7	10
Cycling	0	1	2	3
Football 7-a-side	0	1	0	1
Judo	0	0	1	1
Paracanoe	0	0	1	1
Table tennis	0	0	1	1
Totals (8 entries)	27	31	43	101

== Medalists ==
Medal	Name	Games	Sport	Event
Gold	Reinaldo José Pereira	(United Kingdom) (United States) 1984 Stoke Mandeville/New York	Athletics	Men's 100m C8
Gold	António Carlos Martins	(United Kingdom) (United States) 1984 Stoke Mandeville/New York	Athletics	Men's 200m C8
Gold	António Carlos Martins	(United Kingdom) (United States) 1984 Stoke Mandeville/New York	Athletics	Men's 1500m cross country C8
Gold	António Baltazar; Maria Helena Martins; António José Mateus	(United Kingdom) (United States) 1984 Stoke Mandeville/New York	Boccia	Mixed team
Silver	António Carlos Martins	(United Kingdom) (United States) 1984 Stoke Mandeville/New York	Athletics	Men's 100m C8
Silver	Men's relay team	(United Kingdom) (United States) 1984 Stoke Mandeville/New York	Athletics	Men's 4 × 100 m relay C7-8
Silver	António José Silva	(United Kingdom) (United States) 1984 Stoke Mandeville/New York	Cycling	Men's bicycle 5000m CP div 4
Bronze	Reinaldo José Pereira	(United Kingdom) (United States) 1984 Stoke Mandeville/New York	Athletics	Men's 200m C8
Bronze	António Carlos Martins	(United Kingdom) (United States) 1984 Stoke Mandeville/New York	Athletics	Men's 800m C8
Bronze	António Carlos Martins	(United Kingdom) (United States) 1984 Stoke Mandeville/New York	Athletics	Men's long jump C8
Bronze	Maria Helena Martins	(United Kingdom) (United States) 1984 Stoke Mandeville/New York	Athletics	Women's 60m C2
Bronze	Maria Albertina Cabral	(United Kingdom) (United States) 1984 Stoke Mandeville/New York	Athletics	Women's 1000m cross country C7
Bronze	Cândido Leite	(United Kingdom) (United States) 1984 Stoke Mandeville/New York	Cycling	Men's bicycle 1500m CP div 4
Bronze	Paulo Jorge Santos	(United Kingdom) (United States) 1984 Stoke Mandeville/New York	Table tennis	Men's singles C4
Gold	Olga Pinto	(South Korea) 1988 Seoul	Athletics	Women's distance throw C1
Gold	Olga Pinto	(South Korea) 1988 Seoul	Athletics	Women's precision throw C1
Gold	João Alves; António Marques; Maria Melo	(South Korea) 1988 Seoul	Boccia	Mixed team C1-C2
Silver	José Rebelo	(South Korea) 1988 Seoul	Athletics	Men's 100m C8
Silver	José Rebelo	(South Korea) 1988 Seoul	Athletics	Men's 200m C8
Silver	Manuel Baltazar	(South Korea) 1988 Seoul	Athletics	Men's kick ball C2
Silver	Maria Albertina Cabral	(South Korea) 1988 Seoul	Athletics	Women's 200m C7
Silver	Maria Albertina Cabral	(South Korea) 1988 Seoul	Athletics	Women's 400m C7
Bronze	José Rebelo	(South Korea) 1988 Seoul	Athletics	Men's 400m C8
Bronze	António Marques	(South Korea) 1988 Seoul	Athletics	Men's precision throw C1
Bronze	João Alves	(South Korea) 1988 Seoul	Athletics	Men's precision throw C1
Bronze	Emilia Costa	(South Korea) 1988 Seoul	Athletics	Women's precision throw C1
Bronze	João Alves	(South Korea) 1988 Seoul	Boccia	Mixed individual C1
Bronze	Fernando Ferreira	(South Korea) 1988 Seoul	Boccia	Mixed individual C2
Gold	Carlos Conceição Lopes	(Spain) 1992 Barcelona	Athletics	Men's 200m B1
Gold	Carlos Conceição Lopes	(Spain) 1992 Barcelona	Athletics	Men's 400m B1
Gold	Paulo de Almeida Coelho	(Spain) 1992 Barcelona	Athletics	Men's 1500m B1
Silver	Paulo de Almeida Coelho	(Spain) 1992 Barcelona	Athletics	Men's 5000m B1
Silver	Fernando Costa	(Spain) 1992 Barcelona	Boccia	Mixed individual C2
Silver	Jerônimo Pereira; José Couto; Helder Teixeira; Carlos Amaral Ferreira; Rui Santos Correia; Arlindo Silva; Mário Santos; Candido Machado; José Dias; João Cardoso; Fernando Bento	(Spain) 1992 Barcelona	Football 7-a-side	Men's team
Bronze	Paulo de Almeida Coelho	(Spain) 1992 Barcelona	Athletics	Men's 800m B1
Bronze	Santos Correia; José Dias; Mário Santos; António Jose Silva	(Spain) 1992 Barcelona	Athletics	Men's 4 × 100 m relay C5-8
Bronze	Susana Carvalheira	(Spain) 1992 Barcelona	Swimming	Women's 50m backstroke S3-4
Gold	Domingos Ramião Gomes	(United States) 1996 Atlanta	Athletics	Men's 400m T10
Gold	Domingos Ramião Gomes	(United States) 1996 Atlanta	Athletics	Men's 800m T10
Gold	Paulo de Almeida Coelho	(United States) 1996 Atlanta	Athletics	Men's 1500m T10
Gold	Paulo de Almeida Coelho	(United States) 1996 Atlanta	Athletics	Men's 5000m T10
Gold	José Macedo	(United States) 1996 Atlanta	Boccia	Men's individual C1 wad
Gold	Armando Costa; José Macedo	(United States) 1996 Atlanta	Boccia	Mixed pairs C1 wad
Silver	Paulo de Almeida Coelho	(United States) 1996 Atlanta	Athletics	Men's 800m T10
Silver	João Alves; Fernando Ferreira; António Marques; Pedro Silva	(United States) 1996 Atlanta	Boccia	Mixed team C1-2
Silver	Susana Barroso	(United States) 1996 Atlanta	Swimming	Women's 50m backstroke S3
Silver	Susana Barroso	(United States) 1996 Atlanta	Swimming	Women's 50m freestyle S3
Bronze	Carlos Conceição Lopes	(United States) 1996 Atlanta	Athletics	Men's 400m T10
Bronze	Carlos Amaral Ferreira	(United States) 1996 Atlanta	Athletics	Men's 10000m T10
Bronze	J. Onofre da Costa	(United States) 1996 Atlanta	Athletics	Men's marathon T12
Bronze	Susana Barroso	(United States) 1996 Atlanta	Swimming	Women's 100m freestyle S3
Gold	Gabriel Potra	(Australia) 2000 Sydney	Athletics	Men's 200m T12
Gold	Carlos Conceição Lopes	(Australia) 2000 Sydney	Athletics	Men's 400m T11
Gold	Paulo de Almeida Coelho	(Australia) 2000 Sydney	Athletics	Men's 1500m T11
Gold	Carlos Amaral Ferreira	(Australia) 2000 Sydney	Athletics	Men's marathon T11
Gold	José Alves; Carlos Conceição Lopes; José Gameiro; Gabriel Potra	(Australia) 2000 Sydney	Athletics	Men's 4 × 400 m relay T13
Gold	José Macedo	(Australia) 2000 Sydney	Boccia	Mixed individual BC3
Silver	Firmino Baptista	(Australia) 2000 Sydney	Athletics	Men's 200m T11
Silver	José Monteiro	(Australia) 2000 Sydney	Athletics	Men's 800m T46
Silver	Carlos Amaral Ferreira	(Australia) 2000 Sydney	Athletics	Men's 10000m T11
Silver	Armando Costa	(Australia) 2000 Sydney	Boccia	Mixed individual BC3
Silver	Susana Barroso	(Australia) 2000 Sydney	Swimming	Women's 50m backstroke S3
Bronze	Gabriel Potra	(Australia) 2000 Sydney	Athletics	Men's 100m T12
Bronze	José Alves	(Australia) 2000 Sydney	Athletics	Men's 400m T13
Bronze	Maria Fernandes	(Australia) 2000 Sydney	Athletics	Women's 400m T38
Bronze	Luis Belchior; Fernando Ferreira; António Marques; Pedro Silva	(Australia) 2000 Sydney	Boccia	Mixed team BC1-BC2
Gold	João Paulo Fernandes	(Greece) 2004 Athens	Boccia	Mixed individual BC1
Gold	João Paulo Fernandes; Fernando Ferreira; Cristina Gonçalves; António Marques	(Greece) 2004 Athens	Boccia	Mixed team BC1/BC2
Silver	Carlos Amaral Ferreira	(Greece) 2004 Athens	Athletics	Men's 10000m T11
Silver	Carlos Amaral Ferreira	(Greece) 2004 Athens	Athletics	Men's marathon T11
Silver	Pedro Silva	(Greece) 2004 Athens	Boccia	Mixed individual BC2
Silver	Bruno Valentim	(Greece) 2004 Athens	Boccia	Mixed individual BC4
Silver	Fernando de Oliveira Pereira; Bruno Valentim	(Greece) 2004 Athens	Boccia	Mixed pairs BC4
Bronze	José Alves	(Greece) 2004 Athens	Athletics	Men's 400m T13
Bronze	Fernando Ferreira	(Greece) 2004 Athens	Boccia	Mixed individual BC2
Bronze	João Martins	(Greece) 2004 Athens	Swimming	Men's 50m freestyle S1
Bronze	João Martins	(Greece) 2004 Athens	Swimming	Men's 50m backstroke S1
Bronze	Susana Barroso	(Greece) 2004 Athens	Swimming	Women's 50m backstroke S3
Gold	João Paulo Fernandes	(China) 2008 Beijing	Boccia	Mixed individual BC1
Silver	Luís Gonçalves	(China) 2008 Beijing	Athletics	Men's 400m T12
Silver	António Marques	(China) 2008 Beijing	Boccia	Mixed individual BC1
Silver	João Paulo Fernandes; Fernando Ferreira; Cristina Gonçalves; António Marques	(China) 2008 Beijing	Boccia	Mixed team BC1/2
Silver	Armando Costa; Mario Peixoto; Eunice Raimundo	(China) 2008 Beijing	Boccia	Mixed pairs BC3
Bronze	Fernando Pereira; Bruno Valentim	(China) 2008 Beijing	Boccia	Mixed pairs BC4
Bronze	João Martins	(China) 2008 Beijing	Swimming	Men's 50m backstroke S1
Silver	Armando Costa; José Macedo; Luis Silva	(United Kingdom) 2012 London	Boccia	Mixed pairs BC3
Bronze	Lenine Cunha	(United Kingdom) 2012 London	Athletics	Men's long jump F20
Bronze	José Macedo	(United Kingdom) 2012 London	Boccia	Mixed individual BC3
Bronze	Luís Gonçalves	(Brazil) 2016 Rio de Janeiro	Athletics	Men's 400m T12
Bronze	Manuel Mendes	(Brazil) 2016 Rio de Janeiro	Athletics	Men's marathon T46
Bronze	José Macedo	(Brazil) 2016 Rio de Janeiro	Boccia	Mixed individual BC3
Bronze	Fernando Ferreira; Cristina Gonçalves; António Marques; Abílio Valente	(Brazil) 2016 Rio de Janeiro	Boccia	Mixed team BC1-2
Bronze	Miguel Monteiro	(Japan) 2020 Tokyo	Athletics	Men's shot put F40
Bronze	Norberto Mourão	(Japan) 2020 Tokyo	Paracanoeing	Men's VL2
Gold	Miguel Monteiro	(France) 2024 Paris	Athletics	Men's shot put F40
Gold	Cristina Gonçalves	(France) 2024 Paris	Boccia	Women's individual BC2
Silver	Sandro Baessa	(France) 2024 Paris	Athletics	Men's 1500m T20
Bronze	Diogo Cancela	(France) 2024 Paris	Swimming	Men's 200m individual medley SM8
Bronze	Luis Costa	(France) 2024 Paris	Cycling	Men's road time trial H5
Bronze	Djibrilo Iafa	(France) 2024 Paris	Judo	Men's 73 kg J1
Bronze	Carolina Duarte	(France) 2024 Paris	Athletics	Women's 400 metres T13

== See also ==
- Portugal at the Olympics
