= List of Paralympic medalists in boccia =

Boccia at the Summer Paralympics medalists is a list of medal winners in the sport of boccia at the Summer Paralympic Games. The list includes medal winners from 1984, the year boccia debuted in the Paralympics.

== Medalists ==
=== Men's events (1984) ===
==== Individual C1 ====
Event	Gold	Silver	Bronze
1984 New York/Stoke Mandeville	Henrik Jorgenson; Denmark	Russell Cecchini; Canada	Terry Hudson; Great Britain

==== Individual C2 ====
Event	Gold	Silver	Bronze
1984 New York/Stoke Mandeville	Craig Clifton; United States	Gord Hamilton; Canada	Mark Chard; Great Britain

=== Women's events (1984) ===
==== Individual C1 ====
Event	Gold	Silver	Bronze
1984 New York/Stoke Mandeville	Carol Johnson; Great Britain	Candy Dermarois; United States	Debbie Willows; Canada

==== Individual C2 ====
Event	Gold	Silver	Bronze
1984 New York/Stoke Mandeville	Nancy Anderson; United States	Diane Wiscombe; Great Britain	Jane Spitzley; United States

=== Mixed events ===
==== Mixed individual C1 ====
Event	Gold	Silver	Bronze
1988 Seoul	Kang No Yun; South Korea	Henrik Jorgensen; Denmark	Joao Alves; Portugal
1992 Barcelona	Antonio Cid; Spain	James Thomson; United States	Henrik Jorgenson; Denmark
1996 Atlanta	José Macedo; Portugal	Yolanda Martin; Spain	Paul Driesen; Belgium
2000 Sydney	Gabriel Shelly; Ireland	Antonio Cid; Spain	Francisco Beltran; Spain
2004 Athens	João Paulo Fernandes; Portugal	Roger Aandalen; Norway	Pattaya Tadtong; Thailand
2008 Beijing	João Paulo Fernandes; Portugal	Antonio Marques; Portugal	Gabriel Shelly; Ireland
2012 London	Pattaya Tadtong; Thailand	David Smith; Great Britain	Roger Aandalen; Norway

==== Individual C2 ====
Event	Gold	Silver	Bronze
1988 Seoul	Thomas Leahy; Ireland	Lee Jin-woo; South Korea	Fernando Ferreira; Portugal
1992 Barcelona	Lee Jin-woo; South Korea	Fernando Costa; Portugal	Shin Hyuk Lim; South Korea
1996 Atlanta	Hae Ryong Kim; South Korea	Henrik Jorgensen; Denmark	Steven Thompson; United States
2000 Sydney	Nigel Murray; Great Britain	Lee Jin-woo; South Korea	Jesus Fraile; Spain
2004 Athens	José Javier Curto; Spain	Pedro Silva; Portugal	Fernando Ferreira; Portugal
2008 Beijing	Hoi Ying Karen Kwok; Hong Kong	Nigel Murray; Great Britain	Manuel Ángel Martin; Spain
2012 London	Maciel Sousa Santos; Brazil	Yan Zhiqiang; China	So-Yeong Jeong; South Korea

=== Mixed team events (C1-2) ===
Event	Gold	Silver	Bronze
1984 New York/Stoke Mandeville	Portugal (POR)	Great Britain (GBR)	United States (USA)
1988 Seoul	Portugal (POR)	South Korea (KOR)	Denmark (DEN)
1992 Barcelona	Spain (ESP)	Denmark (DEN)	Ireland (IRL)
1996 Atlanta	Spain (ESP)	Portugal (POR)	South Korea (KOR)
2000 Sydney	South Korea (KOR)	Spain (ESP)	Portugal (POR)
2004 Athens	Portugal (POR)	New Zealand (NZL)	Spain (ESP)
2008 Beijing	Great Britain (GBR)	Portugal (POR)	Spain (ESP)
2012 London	Thailand (THA)	China (CHN)	Great Britain (GBR)
