= Portugal at the 2000 Summer Paralympics =

- IPC code: POR
- NPC: Paralympic Committee of Portugal
- Website: www.comiteparalimpicoportugal.pt (in Portuguese and English)

in Sydney
- Competitors: 52
- Medals Ranked 26th: Gold 6 Silver 5 Bronze 4 Total 15

Summer Paralympics appearances (overview)
- 1972; 1976–1980; 1984; 1988; 1992; 1996; 2000; 2004; 2008; 2012; 2016; 2020; 2024

Portugal competed at the 2000 Summer Paralympics in Sydney, Australia. 52 competitors from Portugal won 15 medals including 6 gold, 5 silver and 4 bronze to finish 26th in the medal table.

== Medal table ==
Medal	Name	Sport	Event
Gold	Gabriel Potra	Athletics	Men's 200m T12
Gold	Carlos Lopes	Athletics	Men's 400m T11
Gold	Paulo de Almeida Coelho	Athletics	Men's 1500m T11
Gold	Carlos Amaral Ferreira	Athletics	Men's marathon T11
Gold	Carlos Lopes; José Alves; José Gameiro; Gabriel Potra	Athletics	Men's 4 × 400 m relay T13
Gold	José Macedo	Boccia	Mixed individual BC3
Silver	Firmino Baptista	Athletics	Men's 200m T11
Silver	José Monteiro	Athletics	Men's 800m T46
Silver	Carlos Amaral Ferreira	Athletics	Men's 10000m T11
Silver	Armando Costa	Boccia	Mixed individual BC3
Silver	Susana Barroso	Swimming	Women's 50m backstroke S3
Bronze	Gabriel Potra	Athletics	Men's 100m T12
Bronze	José Alves	Athletics	Men's 400m T13
Bronze	Maria Fernandes	Athletics	Women's 400m T38
Bronze	Luis Belchior; António Marques; Fernando Ferreira; Pedro Silva	Boccia	Mixed team BC1-BC2

== See also ==
- Portugal at the Paralympics
- Portugal at the 2000 Summer Olympics
