= Portugal at the 2012 Summer Paralympics =

- IPC code: POR
- NPC: Paralympic Committee of Portugal
- Website: www.comiteparalimpicoportugal.pt (in Portuguese and English)

in London
- Competitors: 30 in 5 sports
- Flag bearers: Inês Fernandes (opening); José Macedo (closing)
- Medals Ranked =63rd: Gold 0 Silver 1 Bronze 2 Total 3

Summer Paralympics appearances (overview)
- 1972; 1976–1980; 1984; 1988; 1992; 1996; 2000; 2004; 2008; 2012; 2016; 2020; 2024

Portugal competed at the 2012 Summer Paralympics in London, United Kingdom, from August 29 to September 9, 2012. The Paralympic Committee of Portugal was represented by a delegation of 30 competitors (22 men and 8 women) in 5 sports – athletics, boccia, equestrian, rowing and swimming.

The opening ceremony flag bearer was athlete Inês Fernandes.

== Medallists ==
Medal	Name	Sport	Event	Date
Silver	Armando Costa; José Macedo; Luis Silva	Boccia	Mixed pairs BC3	4 September
Bronze	Lenine Cunha	Athletics	Men's long jump F20	4 September
Bronze	José Macedo	Boccia	Mixed individual BC3	8 September

== Athletics ==
Men

Athlete(s)	Event	Heat		Semifinals		Final	
Athlete(s)	Event	Time	Rank	Time	Rank	Time	Rank
Nuno Alves	1500 m T11	did not finish		—		did not advance	
Nuno Alves	5000 m T11	—				16:06.28	5
Rodolfo Alves	100 m T12	11.91	3	did not advance			
Rodolfo Alves	400 m T12	54.00	3	did not advance			
Firmino Baptista	100 m T11	11.75	3 q	11.65	2	did not advance	
Firmino Baptista	200 m T11	24.00	2 q	24.06	4	did not advance	
Hugo Cavaco	200 m T13	24.22	6	—		did not advance	
Hugo Cavaco	400 m T13	53.10	9	—		did not advance	
Lenine Cunha	Long jump F20	—				6.95	3rd place, bronze medalist(s)
Nelson Gonçalves	Discus throw F12	—				29.04	8
Nelson Gonçalves	Shot put F11–F12	—				9.74	18
Gabriel Macchi	Marathon T12	—				2:40.13	6
Joaquim Machado	Marathon T12	—				2:43.17	8
Ricardo Marques	Shot put F20	—				10.97	12
Jorge Pina	Marathon T12	—				Disqualified	
Gabriel Potra	100 m T12	11.65	4	did not advance			
Gabriel Potra	200 m T12	23.64	2	did not advance			
Ricardo Vale	1500 m T11	4:31.77	11	—		did not advance	
Ricardo Vale	5000 m T11	—				16:32.91	9
Rodolfo Alves; Firmino Baptista; Hugo Cavaco; Gabriel Potra	4 × 100 m relay T11–T13	45.02	7	—		did not advance	

Women

Athlete	Event	Heat		Semifinals		Final	
Athlete	Event	Time	Rank	Time	Rank	Time	Rank
Raquel Cerqueira	Long jump F20	—				4.58	6
Inês Fernandes	Shot put F20	—				11.84	4
Maria Fiuza	1500 m T12	—				5:21.75	8

== Boccia ==
Individual

Athlete	Event	Seeding	Round of 32	Round of 16	Quarterfinals	5th–8th playoffs	Semifinals	Final (Gold / Bronze)	Rank
Athlete	Event	Opponent Result	Opponent Result	Opponent Result	Opponent Result	Opponent Result	Opponent Result	Opponent Result	Rank
João Paulo Fernandes	Mixed individual BC1	Bye		Leung (HKG); W 6–1	Aandalen (NOR); L 3–3	Kim (KOR); W 3–2; Zhang (CHN); W 3–2	did not advance		5
Fernando Ferreira	Mixed individual BC2	Bye	Cortez (ARG); W 5–4	Jeong (KOR); L 4–5	did not advance				
Cristina Gonçalves	Mixed individual BC2	Bye	Bentley (GBR); W 4–1	Zhong (CHN); L 3–4	did not advance				
Abilio Valente	Mixed individual BC2	Bye	Leahy (IRL); W 6–1	Martin Perez (ESP); W 3–3	Yan (CHN); L 5–7	Sohn (KOR); W 3–2; Yeung (HKG); W 4–1	did not advance		5
Armando Costa	Mixed individual BC3	Bye		Martins (BRA); W 11–1	Jeong (KOR); L 1–5	Polychronidis (GRE); L 1–4; Binte (SIN); L 2–2	did not advance		8
José Macedo	Mixed individual BC3	Bye		Gauthier (CAN); W 7–5	de Laender (BEL); W 4–1	—	Jeong (KOR); L 2–2	Kim (KOR); W 3–2	3rd place, bronze medalist(s)
Luis Silva	Mixed individual BC3	Bye		Choi (KOR); L 1–10	did not advance				
Domingos Vieira	Mixed individual BC4	Bye	—	Leung (HKG); L 0–10	did not advance				

Pairs and team

Athlete	Event	Pools		Quarterfinals	Semifinals	Final (Gold / Bronze)	Rank
Athlete	Event	Opponent Result	Rank	Opponent Result	Opponent Result	Opponent Result	Rank
João Paulo Fernandes; Fernando Ferreira; Cristina Gonçalves; Abilio Valente	Mixed team BC1–2	Argentina (ARG); W 6–5; Great Britain (GBR); L 4–5	2	Japan (JPN); W 10–2	China (CHN); L 4–6	Great Britain (GBR); L 5–7	4
Armando Costa; José Macedo; Luis Silva	Mixed pairs BC3	Spain (ESP); W 7–0; Thailand (THA); W 5–1; Belgium (BEL); L 2–3	2	—	South Korea (KOR); W 4–3	Greece (GRE); L 1–4	2nd place, silver medalist(s)
Susana Barroso; Domingos Vieira	Mixed pairs BC4	Brazil (BRA); L 0–10; Czech Republic (CZE); L 1–6; Hong Kong (HKG); L 1–7	4	did not advance			

== Equestrian ==
Athlete	Horse	Event	Score	Rank
Sara Duarte	Neapolitano Morella	Individual championship test Ib	66.261	9
Sara Duarte	Neapolitano Morella	Individual freestyle test Ib	55.350	15
Sara Duarte	Neapolitano Morella	Mixed team test Ib	68.364	7

== Rowing ==
Athlete	Event	Heats		Repechage		Final	
Athlete	Event	Time	Rank	Time	Rank	Time	Rank
Filomena Franco	Women's single sculls	6:31.10	5 R	6:40.48	4 FB	6:48.54	10

Qualification legend: R = Repechage; FA = Final A (1st–6th places); FB = Final B (7th–12th places)

== Swimming ==
Athlete	Event	Heats		Final	
Athlete	Event	Time	Rank	Time	Rank
Simone Fragoso	Women's 50m butterfly S5	58.14	10	did not advance	
Simone Fragoso	Women's 50m freestyle S5	44.49	7 Q	44.78	7
Simone Fragoso	Women's 100m freestyle S5	1:41.56	10	did not advance	
David Grachat	Men's 50m freestyle S9	27.18	10	did not advance	
David Grachat	Men's 100m freestyle S9	58.80	9	did not advance	
David Grachat	Men's 400m freestyle S9	4:24.10 NR	5 Q	4:21.94 NR	6
David Grachat	Men's 200m medley SM9	2:27.01	12	did not advance	
João Martins	Men's 50m backstroke S1	—		1:38.96	4
Adriano Nascimento	Men's 100m breaststroke SB9	1:12.32	8 Q	1:11.87	6

Record legend: WR = World record; PR = Paralympic record; AR = Area record; NR = National record

== See also ==
- Portugal at the Paralympics
- Portugal at the 2012 Summer Olympics
