= Portugal at the 2016 Summer Paralympics =

- IPC code: POR
- NPC: Paralympic Committee of Portugal
- Website: www.comiteparalimpicoportugal.pt (in Portuguese and English)

in Rio de Janeiro
- Competitors: 37 in 7 sports
- Flag bearers: José Macedo (opening); Luís Gonçalves (closing)
- Medals Ranked 73rd: Gold 0 Silver 0 Bronze 4 Total 4

Summer Paralympics appearances (overview)
- 1972; 1976–1980; 1984; 1988; 1992; 1996; 2000; 2004; 2008; 2012; 2016; 2020; 2024

Portugal competed at the 2016 Summer Paralympics in Rio de Janeiro, Brazil, from 7 to 18 September 2016.

== Disability classifications ==
Every participant at the Paralympics has their disability grouped into one of five disability categories; amputation, the condition may be congenital or sustained through injury or illness; cerebral palsy; wheelchair athletes, there is often overlap between this and other categories; visual impairment, including blindness; Les autres, any physical disability that does not fall strictly under one of the other categories, for example dwarfism or multiple sclerosis. Each Paralympic sport then has its own classifications, dependent upon the specific physical demands of competition. Events are given a code, made of numbers and letters, describing the type of event and classification of the athletes competing. Some sports, such as athletics, divide athletes by both the category and severity of their disabilities, other sports, for example swimming, group competitors from different categories together, the only separation being based on the severity of the disability.

== Medalists ==
Medal	Name	Sport	Event	Date
Bronze	Luís Gonçalves	Athletics	Men's 400 m – T12	9 September
Bronze	Fernando Ferreira; Cristina Gonçalves; António Marques; Abílio Valente	Boccia	Mixed team BC1–2	12 September
Bronze	José Macedo	Boccia	Mixed individual BC3	16 September
Bronze	Manuel Mendes	Athletics	Men's marathon – T46	18 September

== Athletics ==
Key

- Note–Ranks given for track events are within the athlete's heat only
- Q = Qualified for the next round
- q = Qualified for the next round as a fastest loser or, in field events, by position without achieving the qualifying target
- NR = National record
- N/A = Round not applicable for the event
- Bye = Athlete not required to compete in round

Men

Track

Athlete	Events	Heat		Semifinal		Final	
Athlete	Events	Time	Rank	Time	Rank	Time	Rank
Nuno Alves; Guide: Ricardo Abreu	1500m – T11	4:36.32	5	—N/a		did not advance	
Nuno Alves; Guide: Ricardo Abreu	5000m – T11	—N/a				17:03.64	8
Luís Gonçalves	200m – T12	22.83	2 q	22.98	4	did not advance	
Luís Gonçalves	400m – T12	49.60	2 q	49.92	1 Q	49.54	3rd place, bronze medalist(s)
Gabriel Macchi	Marathon – T12	—N/a				2:43:49	6
Manuel Mendes	Marathon – T46	—N/a				2:49:57	3rd place, bronze medalist(s)
Hélder Mestre	100m – T51	—N/a				24.35	8
Hélder Mestre	400m – T51	—N/a				1:30.82	7
Cristiano Pereira	1500m – T20	—N/a				3:59.92	7
Jorge Pina	Marathon – T12	—N/a				2:55:47	7
Mário Trindade	100m – T52	17.94	3 Q	—N/a		18.19	6
Mário Trindade	400m – T52	1:02.51	3 Q	—N/a		1:05.35	8

Field

Athlete	Events	Result	Rank
Lenine Cunha	Long jump – F20	6.84	6
Miguel Monteiro	Shot put – F40	8.89	5

Women

Track

Athlete	Events	Heat		Semifinal		Final	
Athlete	Events	Time	Rank	Time	Rank	Time	Rank
Carolina Duarte	100m – T13	12.53	3 Q	—N/a		12.48 NR	6
Carolina Duarte	400m – T13	—N/a				58.52	7
Maria Fernandes	100m – T38	14.65	8	did not advance			
Maria Fernandes	400m – T38	—N/a				1:08.62	6
Maria Fiúza; Guide: Rui Chaves	1500m – T11	5:24.14	5	—N/a		did not advance	
Carina Paim	400m – T20	1:02.16	6	—N/a		did not advance	

Field

Athlete	Events	Result	Rank
Maria Fernandes	Long jump – F38	4.04	11
Inês Fernandes	Shot put – F20	11.69	6
Ana Filipe	Long jump – F20	4.31	9
Erica Gomes	Long jump – F20	4.67	7

== Boccia ==
Individual

Athlete	Event	Pool Rounds				Quarterfinals	Semifinals	Final (Gold / Bronze)	Rank
Athlete	Event	Opponent Score	Opponent Score	Opponent Score	Rank	Opponent Score	Opponent Score	Opponent Score	Rank
António Marques	Mixed individual BC1	Zhang (CHN); W 3–2	Nagy (SVK); L 2–4	Smith (GBR); W 9–3	1	Chagas (BRA); W 4–3	Perez (NED); L 1–8	Yoo (KOR); L 1–8	4
Fernando Ferreira	Mixed individual BC2	—N/a	Yan (CHN); L 1–8	Yeung (HKG); W 5–2	2	did not advance			
Cristina Gonçalves	Mixed individual BC2	—N/a	Rowe (GBR); W 7–2	Saengampa (THA); L 4–7	2	did not advance			
Abilio Valente	Mixed individual BC2	—N/a	Araújo (BRA); W 4–1	Zhong (CHN); W 2–2 (TB)	1	Saengampa (THA); L 1–12	did not advance		
Armando Costa	Mixed individual BC3	—N/a	Oliveira (BRA); L 1–6	Vasicek (CZE); L 1–4	3	did not advance			
José Macedo	Mixed individual BC3	—N/a	Garneau (CAN); W 7–2	Choi (KOR); W 3–1	1	Bjurström (SWE); W 7–0	Jeong (KOR); L 1–6	Kim (KOR); W 5–5 (TB)	3rd place, bronze medalist(s)
Mário Peixoto	Mixed individual BC3	—N/a	Wilson (GBR); L 2–4	Takahashi (JPN); L 2–4	3	did not advance			
Pedro Clara	Mixed individual BC4	McGuire (GBR); L 3–4	Pinto (BRA); W 6–5	Lau Wai Yan (HKG); W 5–3	2	Seo (KOR); L 2–5	did not advance		
Domingos Vieira	Mixed individual BC4	Seo (KOR); L 3–5	Leung (HKG); L 3–5	Morfi-Metzou (GRE); W 6–1	3	did not advance			

Pairs and team

Athlete	Event	Pool Rounds				Quarterfinals	Semifinals	Final (Gold / Bronze)	Rank
Athlete	Event	Opponent Score	Opponent Score	Opponent Score	Rank	Opponent Score	Opponent Score	Opponent Score	Rank
Fernando Ferreira; Cristina Gonçalves; António Marques; Abílio Valente	Mixed team BC1–2	—N/a	Argentina (ARG); L 1–7	Slovakia (SVK); W 12–1	2	Brazil (BRA); W 6–5	Japan (JPN); L 5–8	Argentina (ARG); W 6–2	3rd place, bronze medalist(s)
Armando Costa; José Macedo; Mário Peixoto	Mixed pairs BC3	Great Britain (GBR); W 4–3	Singapore (SIN); L 1–5	Greece (GRE); L 2–5	3	—N/a	did not advance		
Pedro Clara; Clara Oliveira; Domingos Vieira	Mixed pairs BC4	Hong Kong (HKG); L 2–6	Great Britain (GBR); L 4–11	Slovakia (SVK); L 4–8	4	—N/a	did not advance		

== Cycling ==
With one pathway for qualification being one highest ranked NPCs on the UCI Para-Cycling male and female Nations Ranking Lists on 31 December 2014, Portugal qualified for the 2016 Summer Paralympics in Rio, assuming they continued to meet all other eligibility requirements.

=== Road ===
Athlete	Event	Time	Rank
Luís Costa	Men's road race – H5	1:37:56	8
Luís Costa	Men's time trial – H5	31:06.06	8
Telmo Pinão	Men's road race – C1–3	1:58:55	22
Telmo Pinão	Men's time trial – C2	30:38.04	12

== Equestrian ==
Ana Veiga was given a Bipartite Commission Invitation slot to compete in Rio.

Athlete	Horse	Event	Score	Rank
Ana Veiga	Convicto	Individual championship test Ia	65.696	21
Ana Veiga	Convicto	Mixed team test Ia	68.261	17

== Judo ==
Athlete	Event	Preliminaries	Quarterfinals	Semifinals	Repechage First round	Repechage Final	Final / BM	
Athlete	Event	Opposition Result	Opposition Result	Opposition Result	Opposition Result	Opposition Result	Opposition Result	Rank
Miguel Vieira	Men's −66 kg	Oliveira Boto (BRA); L 000–100	did not advance					

== Shooting ==
The last direct qualifying event for Rio in shooting took place at the 2015 IPC Shooting World Cup in Fort Benning in November. Adelino Rocha earned a qualifying spot for their country at this competition in the P4 Mixed 50m Pistol SH1 event.

Athlete	Event	Qualification		Final	
Athlete	Event	Points	Rank	Points	Rank
Adelino Rocha	Men's 10 m air pistol – SH1	549	27	did not advance	
Adelino Rocha	Mixed 25 m pistol – SH1	520	30	did not advance	
Adelino Rocha	Mixed 50 m pistol – SH1	501	29	did not advance	

== Swimming ==
Men

Athlete	Event	Heat		Final	
Athlete	Event	Time	Rank	Time	Rank
David Carreira	50 m freestyle – S8	29.32	14	did not advance	
David Carreira	100 m butterfly – S8	1:07.43	10	did not advance	
David Carreira	200 m individual medley – SM8	2:45.23	13	did not advance	
David Grachat	50 m freestyle – S9	27.03	11	did not advance	
David Grachat	100 m freestyle – S9	57.90	9	did not advance	
David Grachat	400 m freestyle – S9	4:22.86	4 Q	4:27.73	8
Nelson Lopes	50 m backstroke – S4	53.51	9	did not advance	
Nelson Lopes	200 m freestyle – S4	3:51.29	11	did not advance	

Women

Athlete	Event	Heat		Final	
Athlete	Event	Time	Rank	Time	Rank
Joana Calado	100 m backstroke – SB8	1:26.52	5 Q	1:25.96	5
Simone Fragoso	50 m freestyle – S5	46.49	15	did not advance	
Simone Fragoso	50 m butterfly – S5	56.23	12	did not advance	
Simone Fragoso	50 m backstroke – S5	Withdraw			
Simone Fragoso	200 m individual medley – SM5	4:26.08	11	did not advance	

Record legend: WR = World record; PR = Paralympic record; AR = Area record; NR = National record

== See also ==
- Portugal at the 2016 Summer Olympics
