= Portugal at the 2008 Summer Paralympics =

- IPC code: POR
- NPC: Paralympic Committee of Portugal
- Website: www.comiteparalimpicoportugal.pt (in Portuguese and English)

in Beijing
- Competitors: 35 in 7 sports
- Flag bearer: Filomena Franco
- Officials: 56
- Medals Ranked 42nd: Gold 1 Silver 4 Bronze 2 Total 7

Summer Paralympics appearances (overview)
- 1972; 1976–1980; 1984; 1988; 1992; 1996; 2000; 2004; 2008; 2012; 2016; 2020; 2024

Portugal competed at the 2008 Summer Paralympics in Beijing. The country participated with 35 competitors in seven sports.

== Medalists ==
Medal	Name	Sport	Event
Gold	João Paulo Fernandes	Boccia	Mixed individual – BC1
Silver	Luís Gonçalves	Athletics	Men's 400 m – T12
Silver	António Marques	Boccia	Mixed individual – BC1
Silver	João Paulo Fernandes; Cristina Gonçalves; Fernando Ferreira; António Marques	Boccia	Mixed team – BC1/2
Silver	Armando Costa; Mário Peixoto; Eunice Raimundo	Boccia	Mixed pairs – BC3
Bronze	Fernando Pereira; Bruno Valentim	Boccia	Mixed pairs – BC4
Bronze	João Martins	Swimming	Men's 50 metre backstroke – S1

== Athletics ==
Men

Athlete(s)	Event	Heat			Semifinal			Final	
Athlete(s)	Event	Result	Rank	Overall	Result	Rank	Overall	Result	Rank
Nuno Alves	1500 m – T11	4:21.41	4	8 q	N/A			Did not advance	
Nuno Alves	5000 m – T11	N/A						Did not finish	
Firmino Baptista	100 m – T11	11.78	1 Q	12	11.73	3	11	Did not advance	
Firmino Baptista	200 m – T11	24.15	3	12 q	24.09	4	8 q	24.13	6
Carlos Ferreira	Marathon – T12	N/A							
Luís Gonçalves	200 m – T12	22.88 SB	1 Q	8	22.83 SB	3	9	Did not advance	
Luís Gonçalves	400 m – T12	49.18 SB	1 Q	2	50.48	2	2 q	50.15	Silver medal
Carlos Lopes	100 m – T11	11.82	2	13	Did not advance				
Gabriel Macchi	10000 m – T12	N/A						Did not finish	
Gabriel Macchi	Marathon – T12	N/A						2:42:06	14
José Monteiro	800 m – T46	2:01.69	6	16	N/A			Did not advance	
José Monteiro	1500 m – T46	4:13.98 SB	9	18	N/A			Did not advance	
Jorge Pina	Marathon – T12	N/A							
Gabriel Potra	200 m – T12	22.92	3	10 q	23.23	4	10	Did not advance	
Gabriel Potra	Pentathlon – P12	N/A						Did not finish	
Alexandrino Silva	Marathon – T54	N/A							
Ricardo Vale	5000 m – T11	N/A						16:32.49	5
Carlos Lopes; Firmino Baptista; Gabriel Potra; Luís Gonçalves	4x100 m – T11/13	Disqualified			N/A			Did not advance	

Women

Athlete(s)	Event	Heat			Semifinal			Final	
Athlete(s)	Event	Result	Rank	Overall	Result	Rank	Overall	Result	Rank
Maria Graça Fernandes	100 m – T38	15.26 SB	5	9	Did not advance				
Maria Graça Fernandes	200 m – T38	31.21 SB	5	8 q	N/A			31.38	8
Odete Fiúza	800 m – T12/13	2:31.67 SB	4	6	Did not advance				
Odete Fiúza	1500 m – T13	N/A						5:03.51	8

== Boccia ==
Four gold medalists from the 2004 Games—João Paulo Fernandes, Cristina Gonçalves, António Marques and Fernando Ferreira—returned to compete in Beijing. The boccia national team's coach is Helena Bastos. Portugal was expected to be a strong contender in this sport as it is regarded as one of the most successful countries ever.

Athlete(s)	Event	Group round				Quarterfinals	Semifinals	Final	Rank
Athlete(s)	Event	Opposition Result	Opposition Result	Opposition Result	Opposition Result	Quarterfinals	Semifinals	Final	Rank
João Paulo Fernandes	Individual BC1	Sarela (FIN); W 4–3	Zhang (CHN); W 6–5	Leung (HKG); W 5–2	Vaquerizo (ESP); W 4–2	Park (KOR); W 3–2	Wang (NOR); W 5–4	Marques (POR); W 8–1	Gold medal
António Marques	Individual BC1	Aandalen (NOR); W 11–3	Sanders (NZL); L 0–6	Moran (IRL); W 4–2	Smith (GBR); L 2–3	Beltran (ESP); W 4–3	Shelly (IRL); W 4–1	Fernandes (POR); L 1–8	Silver medal
Cristina Gonçalves	Individual BC2	Martin (ESP); L 2–4	Norsterud (NOR); W 5–2	Wong (HKG); W 11–0	N/A	Kwok (HKG); L 1–8	Did not advance		
Fernando Ferreira	Individual BC2	Bentley (GBR); W 6–1	Kainuma (JPN); W 8–2	Leahy (IRL); L 2–5	N/A	Cortez (ARG); L 2–5	Did not advance		
Mário Peixoto	Individual BC3	Slade (NZL); W 11–0	Jeong (KOR); L 0–6	Visaratanunta (THA); W 5–0	N/A	Costa (POR); W 3–2	Park (KOR); L 3–4	Bronze Match; Jeong (KOR); L 0–12	4
Armando Costa	Individual BC3	Martin (ESP); W 8–0	Gaulthier (CAN); W 5–3	Stavropoulou (GRE); W 11–2	N/A	Peixoto (POR); L 2–3	Did not advance		
Eunice Raimundo	Individual BC3	Kabush (CAN); W 4–3	Pesquera (ESP); L 4–7	Michos (GRE); W 5–1	N/A	Did not advance			
Bruno Valentim	Individual BC4	Pereira (POR); L 2–5	Pinto (BRA); W 4–2	Gyurkota (HUN); W 7–2	N/A	Did not advance			
Fernando Pereira	Individual BC4	Valentim (POR); W 5–2	Gyurkota (HUN); W 5–0	Pinto (BRA); L 4–7	N/A	Leung (HKG); L 2–9	Did not advance		
Armando Costa; Mário Peixoto; Eunice Raimundo	Pairs BC3	New Zealand (NZL); W 4–0	Greece (GRE); W 5–2	Thailand (THA); W 7–1	N/A		Spain (ESP); L 4–6	Bronze Match; Thailand (THA); W 4–1	Bronze medal
Fernando Pereira; Bruno Valentim	Pairs BC4	Cuifang & Suili (CHN); W 7–0	Katrina & Prochazka (CZE); W 6-5	Leung & Lau (HKG); L 2–3	N/A		Baixauli & Dueso (ESP); W 4–3	Pinto & Santos (BRA); L 2–5	Silver medal
João Paulo Fernandes; Fernando Ferreira; Cristina Gonçalves; António Marques	Team BC1–2	Japan (JPN); W 7–4	Norway (NOR); W 19–1	N/A		Argentina (ARG); W 8–3	Spain (ESP); W 8–2	Great Britain (GBR); L 4–8	Silver medal

== Cycling ==
Men

Athlete	Event	Result	Rank
Augusto Pereira	Road race (LC3–4/CP3)	1:49:37	22
Augusto Pereira	Road time trial (CP3)	43:43.02	7

== Equestrian ==
Athlete	Horse	Event	Final Score	Rank
Sara Duarte	Neapolitano Morel	Freestyle grade II	66.336	5

== Rowing ==
Athlete	Event	Heats		Repechage		Final B		Rank
Athlete	Event	Time	Rank	Time	Rank	Time	Rank	Rank
Filomena Franco	Women's single sculls	7:31.90	6	8:29:90	5	8:04:89	5	11

== Swimming ==
Men

Athlete	Event	Heats			Final	
Athlete	Event	Time	Rank	Overall	Time	Rank
David Grachat	50 m freestyle – S9	26.77	4	9	Did not advance	
David Grachat	100 m freestyle – S9	57.93	3	6 Q	57.55	6
David Grachat	200 m individual medley – SM9	2:28.75	3	7 Q	2:26.13	7
Nélson Lopes	50 m backstroke – S4	52.74	5	8 Q	53.38	8
Nélson Lopes	150 m individual medley – SM4	3:15.06	6	9	Did not advance	
João Martins	50 m backstroke – S1	N/A			1:47.76	Bronze medal

Women

Athlete	Event	Heats			Final	
Athlete	Event	Time	Rank	Overall	Time	Rank
Joana Calado	100 m breaststroke – SB8	1:28.46	4	6 Q	1:28.53	5
Joana Calado	200 m individual medley – SM9	2:52.52	7	12	Did not advance	
Simone Fragoso	50 m freestyle – S5	48.69	6	10	Did not advance	
Simone Fragoso	50 m backstroke – S5	58.90	7	11	Did not advance	
Diana Guimarães	50 m backstroke – S5	1:06.57	6	13	Did not advance	
Diana Guimarães	100 m breaststroke – SB4	2:22.77	5	9	Did not advance	
Leila Marques	100 m breaststroke – SB8	1:29.99	5	7 Q	1:30.11	7
Leila Marques	400 m freestyle – S9	5:10.30	5	13	Did not advance	
Perpétua Vaza	50 m freestyle – S3	1:16.18	5	9	Did not advance	
Perpétua Vaza	50 m backstroke – S3	1:21.95	5	10	Did not advance	

== Sailing ==
Athlete(s)	Event	Races											Total points	Net points	Rank
Athlete(s)	Event	1	2	3	4	5	6	7	8	9	10	11	Total points	Net points	Rank
Bento Amaral (s); Luísa Silvano (c)	SKUD18	8	8	6	~~9~~	~~9~~	8	5	6	6	8		73	55	9

== See also ==
- Portugal at the Paralympics
- Portugal at the 2008 Summer Olympics
