= Portugal at the 1996 Summer Paralympics =

- IPC code: POR
- NPC: Paralympic Committee of Portugal
- Website: www.comiteparalimpicoportugal.pt (in Portuguese and English)

in Atlanta
- Competitors: 35 (29 men and 6 women)
- Medals Ranked 26th: Gold 6 Silver 4 Bronze 4 Total 14

Summer Paralympics appearances (overview)
- 1972; 1976–1980; 1984; 1988; 1992; 1996; 2000; 2004; 2008; 2012; 2016; 2020; 2024

35 athletes (29 men and 6 women) from Portugal competed at the 1996 Summer Paralympics in Atlanta, United States.

== Medallists ==
Medal	Name	Sport	Event
Gold	Domingos Ramiao Game	Athletics	Men's 400m T10
Gold	Domingos Ramiao Game	Athletics	Men's 800m T10
Gold	Paulo de Almeida Coelho	Athletics	Men's 1500m T10
Gold	Paulo de Almeida Coelho	Athletics	Men's 5000m T10
Gold	José Macedo	Boccia	Mixed individual C1 wad
Gold	José Macedo; Armando Costa	Boccia	Pairs C1 wad
Silver	Paulo de Almeida Coelho	Athletics	Men's 800m T10
Silver	Pedro Silva; António Marques; Fernando Ferreira; João Alves	Boccia	Mixed teams C1-C2
Silver	Susana Barroso	Swimming	Women's 50m backstroke S3
Silver	Susana Barroso	Swimming	Women's 50m freestyle S3
Bronze	Carlos Lopes	Athletics	Men's 400m T10
Bronze	Carlos Amaral Ferreira	Athletics	Men's 10000m T10
Bronze	J. Onofre da Costa	Athletics	Men's marathon T12
Bronze	Susana Barroso	Swimming	Women's 100m freestyle S3

== See also ==
- Portugal at the Paralympics
- Portugal at the 1996 Summer Olympics
