= Portugal at the 2024 Summer Paralympics =

- IPC code: POR
- NPC: Paralympic Committee of Portugal
- Website: www.comiteparalimpicoportugal.pt (in Portuguese and English)

in Paris, France August 28, 2024 – September 8, 2024
- Competitors: 27 in 10 sports
- Flag bearers: Diogo Cancela; Margarida Lapa
- Medals Ranked 43rd: Gold 2 Silver 1 Bronze 4 Total 7

Summer Paralympics appearances (overview)
- 1972; 1976–1980; 1984; 1988; 1992; 1996; 2000; 2004; 2008; 2012; 2016; 2020; 2024

Portugal competed at the 2024 Summer Paralympics in Paris, France, from 28 August to 8 September.

== Medalists ==
Medal	Name	Sport	Event	Date
Gold	Miguel Monteiro	Athletics	Men's shot put F40	1 September
Gold	Cristina Gonçalves	Boccia	Women's individual BC2	1 September
Silver	Sandro Baessa	Athletics	Men's 1500 metres T20	6 September
Bronze	Diogo Cancela	Swimming	Men's 200 metre individual medley SM8	1 September
Bronze	Luis Costa	Cycling	Men's road time trial H5	4 September
Bronze	Djibrilo Iafa	Judo	Men's 73 kg J1	6 September
Bronze	Carolina Duarte	Athletics	Women's 400 metres T13	7 September

Medals by sport
Sport	1st place, gold medalist(s)	2nd place, silver medalist(s)	3rd place, bronze medalist(s)	Total
Athletics	1	1	1	3
Boccia	1	0	0	1
Cycling	0	0	1	1
Judo	0	0	1	1
Swimming	0	0	1	1
Total	2	1	4	7

Medals by gender
Gender	1st place, gold medalist(s)	2nd place, silver medalist(s)	3rd place, bronze medalist(s)	Total
Female	1	0	1	2
Male	1	1	3	5
Mixed	0	0	0	0
Total	2	1	4	7

Medals by date
Date	1st place, gold medalist(s)	2nd place, silver medalist(s)	3rd place, bronze medalist(s)	Total
1 September	2	0	1	3
4 September	0	0	1	1
6 September	0	1	1	2
7 September	0	0	1	1
Total	2	1	4	7

== Competitors ==
The following is the list of number of competitors in the Games.

Sport	Men	Women	Total
Athletics	2	2	4
Boccia	1	2	3
Cycling	1	0	1
Paracanoeing	2	0	2
Swimming	2	0	2
Total	8	4	12

== Athletics ==
Portuguese track and field athletes achieved quota places for the following events based on their results at the 2023 World Championships, 2024 World Championships, or through high performance allocation, as long as they meet the minimum entry standard (MES).

Key

- Note–Ranks given for track events are within the athlete's heat only
- Q = Qualified for the next round
- q = Qualified for the next round as a fastest loser or, in field events, by position without achieving the qualifying target
- DQ = Disqualified
- PR = Paralympic Record
- AR = Area (or continental) Record
- NR = National Record
- SB = Season's Best
- N/A = Round not applicable for the event
- Bye = Athlete not required to compete in round

Track & road events

Athlete	Event	Heat		Final	
Athlete	Event	Result	Rank	Result	Rank
Sandro Baessa	Men's 1500 m T20	—N/a		3:49.46 PB	2nd place, silver medalist(s)
Carolina Duarte	Women's 400 m T13	55.99	1 Q	55.52	3rd place, bronze medalist(s)
Carina Paim	Women's 400 m T20	58.37	4	Did not advance	

Field events

Athlete	Event	Final	
Athlete	Event	Distance	Position
Miguel Monteiro	Men's shot put F40	11.21 PR	1st place, gold medalist(s)

== Boccia ==
Portugal entered six athletes into the Paralympics games, after nominated top two individual athletes in men's individual BC3 events and women's BC3 and BC4 individual events, and top four in BC1/BC2 team events, through the final world ranking.

Athlete	Event	Pool matches						Playoff round	Quarterfinals	Semifinals	Final / BM	
Athlete	Event	Opposition Score	Opposition Score	Opposition Score	Opposition Score	Opposition Score	Rank	Opposition Score	Opposition Score	Opposition Score	Rank	
Andre Ramos	Men's individual BC1	Cryderman (CAN); W 7–0	Loung (HKG); W 7–6	—N/a			1 Q	—N/a	Jung (KOR); L 2–3	Did not advance		
David Araujo	Men's individual BC2	Silva (BRA); W 8–0	Fabre (FRA); L 2-4	Cristaldo (ARG); W 6–2	—N/a		1 Q	Vongsa (THA); L 1-6	did not advance			
José Gonçalves	Men's individual BC3	Jeong (KOR); W 4–2	Choochuenklin (THA); W 9–0	Romero (COL); L 2–4	—N/a		3 E	Did not advance				
Ana Correia	Women's individual BC2	Jeong (KOR); L 3–1	Haggo (GBR); L 4–3	—N/a			3 E	Did not advance				
Cristina Gonçalves	Women's individual BC2	Taggart (GBR); L 4-3	Léon (ECU); W 3-1	—N/a			1 Q	—N/a	Duarte (ESA); W 5–4	Zayana (INA); W 7-3	Jeong (KOR); W 4-1	1st place, gold medalist(s)
Ana Costa	Women's individual BC3	Ho (HKG); L 2–3	Calado (BRA); L 2–8	Jordaan (RSA); W 4–2	—N/a		3 E	Did not advance				
Carla Oliveira	Women's individual BC4	Teixeira (BRA); W 4-2	Szabo (HUN); W 5-0	Raguwaran (GER); L 2-7	—N/a		1 Q	—N/a	Lin Ximei (CHN); L 2–5	Did not advance		
Andre Ramos; David Araujo; Cristina Gonçalves	Mixed team BC1-2	Great Britain; L 4-5	China; L 3-8	—N/a			3 E	Did not advance				

== Cycling ==
Portugal entered one male para-cyclist after finished the top eligible nation's at the 2022 UCI Nation's ranking allocation ranking.

=== Track ===
Men

Athlete	Event	Qualification		Final	
Athlete	Event	Result	Rank	Result	Rank
Telmo Pinão	Men's time trial C1-3	1:16.154	14	Did not advance	
Telmo Pinão	Men's pursuit C2	3:59.150	7	Did not advance	

== Paracanoeing ==
Portugal earned quota places for the following events through the 2023 ICF Canoe Sprint World Championships in Duisburg, Germany.

Athlete	Event	Heats		Semifinal		Final	
Athlete	Event	Time	Rank	Time	Rank	Time	Rank
	Men's KL1						
	Men's VL2						

== Swimming ==
Portugal secured two quotas at the 2023 World Para Swimming Championships after finishing in the top two places in Paralympic class disciplines.

Athlete	Event	Heats		Final	
Athlete	Event	Result	Rank	Result	Rank
	Men's 100 m backstroke S11				
Diogo Cancela	Men's 200 m individual medley SM8				3rd place, bronze medalist(s)

== See also ==
- Portugal at the 2024 Summer Olympics
- Portugal at the Paralympics
