= Boccia at the Summer Paralympics =

- Governing body: CP-ISRA
- Events: 3 (mixed)

Games
- 1960; 1964; 1968; 1972; 1976; 1980; 1984; 1988; 1992; 1996; 2000; 2004; 2008; 2012; 2016; 2020; 2024
- Medalists

Boccia has been contested at the Summer Paralympics since the 1984 Games in New York City and Stoke Mandeville.

This sport requires strategy and precision, and is similar to curling or French pétanque. It is played on a court 12.5 m by 6 m wide. Each team has 6 leather balls, and must bring them as close as possible to a white ball called a “jack”.

Five boccia events were held at those games, two for men, two for women, and one mixed event where men and women competed together. From 1988 until 2020, all boccia events at the Paralympics have been mixed. In 2024, separate events for men and women as individuals will be reintroduced, while pairs and team competition will remain mixed sex. Athletes in this sport have cerebral palsy and are given a classification according to the extent of their disability. There were originally two classes, C1 and C2, with C1 corresponding to those with more severe impairment. In 1996 a "C1 with aid device" class was added, and in 2000 the system was changed to have four classes, BC1 through BC4.

With the reintroduction of the separate sex classifications for individual play, the 2024 Paralympic Games will have the highest number of events in the history of the sport, eleven.

== Summary ==
Games	Year	Events	Best Nation
1	1960	not held	
2	1964	not held	
3	1968	not held	
4	1972	not held	
5	1976	not held	
6	1978	not held	
7	1984	5	United States
8	1988	3	South Korea
9	1992	3	Spain
10	1996	5	Spain
11	2000	5	Ireland
12	2004	7	Portugal
13	2008	7	Brazil / South Korea
14	2012	7	Brazil
15	2016	7	Thailand
16	2020	7	Slovakia
17	2024	11	Hong Kong

== Events ==
The table below gives the total number of boccia events and the disability classifications contested in individual, pairs, and team competition for each edition of the Summer Paralympics. All events were mixed unless noted otherwise.

Year	Number of events	Individual events	Pairs events	Team events
1984	5	Men's C1; Men's C2; Women's C1; Women's C2		Open
1988	3	C1; C2		C1–C2
1992	3	C1; C2		C1–C2
1996	5	C1; C1 with aid device C2	C1 with aid device	C1–C2
2000	5	BC1; BC2; BC3	BC3	BC1–BC2
2004	7	BC1; BC2; BC3; BC4	BC3; BC4	BC1–BC2
2008	7	BC1; BC2; BC3; BC4	BC3; BC4	BC1–BC2
2012	7	BC1 BC2 BC3 BC4	BC3 BC4	BC1-BC2
2016	7	BC1 BC2 BC3 BC4	BC3 BC4	BC1-BC2
2020	7	BC1 BC2 BC3 BC4	BC3 BC4	BC1-BC2
2024	11	Men's BC1; Men's BC2; Men's BC3; Men's BC4; Women's BC1; Women's BC2; Women's BC3; Women's BC4	BC3; BC4	BC1-BC2

== Medal table ==
Updated after the 2024 Summer Paralympics

Rank	Nation	Gold	Silver	Bronze	Total
1	South Korea (KOR)	11	9	8	28
2	Portugal (POR)	9	10	9	28
3	Hong Kong (HKG)	7	4	1	12
4	Thailand (THA)	7	2	6	15
5	Great Britain (GBR)	6	5	3	14
6	Brazil (BRA)	6	1	4	11
7	Spain (ESP)	5	7	7	19
8	Ireland (IRL)	3	1	2	6
9	Slovakia (SVK)	3	1	0	4
10	China (CHN)	2	4	1	7
11	United States (USA)	2	2	3	7
12	Greece (GRE)	1	3	3	7
12	Japan (JPN)	1	3	3	7
14	Denmark (DEN)	1	3	2	6
15	Canada (CAN)	1	2	5	8
16	Colombia (COL)	1	1	1	3
16	Czech Republic (CZE)	1	1	1	3
18	France (FRA)	1	0	0	1
19	Australia (AUS)	0	2	2	4
19	Indonesia (INA)	0	2	2	4
21	Norway (NOR)	0	1	1	2
22	Malaysia (MAS)	0	1	0	1
22	Netherlands (NED)	0	1	0	1
22	New Zealand (NZL)	0	1	0	1
22	Singapore (SGP)	0	1	0	1
26	Belgium (BEL)	0	0	2	2
27	Argentina (ARG)	0	0	1	1
27	Hungary (HUN)	0	0	1	1
27	RPC (RPC)	0	0	1	1
27	Ukraine (UKR)	0	0	1	1
Totals (30 entries)		68	68	70	206

== Multi medalists ==
Boccia players who have won two gold medals or five medals. Active players are in bold.

No.	Athlete	Country	Years	Games	Gender	Gold	Silver	Bronze	Total
1	Dirceu Pinto	Brazil (BRA)	2008-2016	3	M	4	1	0	5
2	Antonio Cid	Spain (ESP)	1992-2004	4	M	3	2	1	6
2	Jeong Ho-won	South Korea (KOR)	2008-2020	4	M	3	2	1	6
4	**David Smith**	Great Britain (GBR)	2008-2020	4	M	3	1	1	5
5	João Paulo Fernandes	Portugal (POR)	2004-2008	2	M	3	1	0	4
6	**Pattaya Tadtong**	Thailand (THA)	2004-2016	3	M	3	0	1	4
7	**Antonio Marques**	Portugal (POR)	1988, 1996-2008, 2016	6	M	2	3	2	7
8	**Eliseu dos Santos**	Brazil (BRA)	2008-2016	3	M	2	1	2	5
9	**Grigorios Polychronidis**	Greece (GRE)	2012-2024	4	M	1	3	3	7
10	Nigel Murray	Great Britain (GBR)	2000-2012	4	M	2	1	1	4
11	Henrik Jorgensen	Denmark (DEN)	1984-1996, 2004	5	M	1	3	2	6

== Nations ==
Nation	60	64	68	72	76	80	84	88	92	96	00	04	08	12	16	20	24	Total
Argentina (ARG)											6	5	4	4	4	5		6
Australia (AUS)								4	4	6	6				1	3		6
Austria (AUT)										4	4	4						3
Belgium (BEL)									4	2	2			3	3	1		6
Bermuda (BER)															1			1
Brazil (BRA)													2	7	10	11		4
Canada (CAN)							4	2	4	6	6	8	7	9	6	4		10
China (CHN)													9	5	6	5		4
Colombia (COL)																3		1
Croatia (CRO)																1		1
Czech Republic (CZE)											2	2	2	3	2	2		6
Denmark (DEN)							1	3	4	4		4						5
Finland (FIN)													3					1
France (FRA)																3		1
Great Britain (GBR)							7	6	4	6	4	4	4	9	10	9		10
Germany (GER)																1		1
Greece (GRE)												4	3	5	5	3		5
Hong Kong (HKG)												6	6	6	8	7		5
Hungary (HUN)												2	2					2
Ireland (IRL)								3	4	4	6	6	4	5				7
Israel (ISR)															1	1		2
Japan (JPN)													4	5	5	10		4
Kuwait (KUW)									3									1
Malaysia (MAS)																1		1
Mexico (MEX)														1	1	1		3
Netherlands (NED)															3	1		2
New Zealand (NZL)										2	4	6	7					4
Norway (NOR)										4	4	4	3	1	1			6
Portugal (POR)							3	6	4	6	6	9	9	9	10	10		10
Singapore (SGP)														1	2			2
Slovakia (SVK)												2	2	5	7	7		5
South Korea (KOR)								6	3	4	4	2	4	7	8	6		9
Spain (ESP)									4	6	6	9	9	8	4			7
Sweden (SWE)										4				1	1	1		4
Thailand (THA)												4	3	8	7	10		5
United States (USA)							4	4	4	6	4	3	1	1				8
Nations							5	8	11	14	14	18	20	21	23	24		
Competitors							19	34	42	64	64	84	88	103	106	106		
Year	60	64	68	72	76	80	84	88	92	96	00	04	08	12	16	20		
