= Boccia at the 2008 Summer Paralympics – Individual BC1 =

Individual BC1 at the XIII Paralympic Games
- Paralympic Boccia
- Venue: Olympic Green Convention Center
- Dates: 7–9 September 2008
- Competitors: 20 from 14 nations

Medalists
1st place, gold medalist(s)		Joao Paulo Fernandes	Portugal
2nd place, silver medalist(s)		Antonio Marques	Portugal
3rd place, bronze medalist(s)		Gabriel Shelly	Ireland

The Boccia Individual BC1 event at the 2008 Summer Paralympics was held in the Olympic Green Convention Center on 7–9 September. The preliminary stages consisted of 4 round-robin groups of 5 competitors each. The top two players in each group qualified for the final stages. The event was won by Joao Paulo Fernandes, representing Portugal.

== Results ==
- indicates matches in which an extra (fifth) end was played

=== Preliminaries ===
==== Pool A ====
Rank	Competitor	MP	W	L	Points	ESP	CHN	ARG	CAN	USA
1	Francisco Javier Beltran (ESP)	4	4	0	34:5	x	6:0	14:0	5:4	9:1
2	Wang Yi (CHN)	4	3	1	17:10	0:6	x	6:1	3:2	8:1
3	Gabriela Villano (ARG)	4	2	2	10:22	0:14	1:6	x	6:1	3:1
4	Hanif Mawji (CAN)	4	1	3	10:16	4:5	2:3	1:6	x	3:2*
5	Timothy Hawker (USA)	4	0	4	5:23	1:9	1:8	1:3	2:3*	x

==== Pool B ====
Rank	Competitor	MP	W	L	Points	IRL	POR	NZL	GBR	NOR
1	Padraic Moran (IRL)	4	3	1	22:9	x	2:4	7:3	9:0	4:2
2	António Marques (POR)	4	2	2	17:14	4:2	x	0:6	2:3	11:3
3	Liam Sanders (NZL)	4	2	2	16:14	3:7	6:0	x	5:2	2:5
4	David Smith (GBR)	4	2	2	11:17	0:9	3:2	2:5	x	6:1
5	Roger Aandalen (NOR)	4	1	3	11:23	2:4	3:11	5:2	1:6	x

==== Pool C ====
Rank	Competitor	MP	W	L	Points	POR	ESP	CHN	HKG	FIN
1	João Paulo Fernandes (POR)	4	4	0	19:12	x	4:2	6:5	5:2	4:3
2	Jose Vaquerizo (ESP)	4	3	1	14:9	2:4	x	4:3	5:0	3:2
3	Zhang Qi (CHN)	4	2	2	21:13	5:6	3:4	x	10:1	3:2*
4	Leung Mei Yee (HKG)	4	1	3	6:22	2:5	0:5	1:10	x	3:2
5	Leena Sarela (FIN)	4	0	4	9:13	3:4	2:3	2:3*	2:3	x

==== Pool D ====
Rank	Competitor	MP	W	L	Points	IRL	KOR	CAN	ARG	JPN
1	Gabriel Shelly (IRL)	4	3	1	15:11	x	3:5	4:2	3:2	5:2
2	Park Jae Suk (KOR)	4	3	1	18:16	5:3	x	0:7	5:2	8:4*
3	Brock Richardson (CAN)	4	2	2	19:12	2:4	7:0	x	7:4	3:4
4	Mauricio Ibarbure (ARG)	4	1	3	14:17	2:3	2:5	4:7	x	6:2
5	Takayuki Kitani (JPN)	4	1	3	12:22	2:5	4:8*	4:3	2:6	x

=== Competition bracket ===
Quarter-finals
Francisco Javier Beltran (ESP)	3
António Marques (POR)	4
Gabriel Shelly (IRL)	8
José Vaquerizo (ESP)	2
Padraic Moran (IRL)	5*
Wang Yi (CHN)	6*
João Paulo Fernandes (POR)	3
Park Jae Suk (KOR)	2

Semi-finals
António Marques (POR)	4
Gabriel Shelly (IRL)	1
Wang Yi (CHN)	4
João Paulo Fernandes (POR)	5

Final
António Marques (POR)	1
João Paulo Fernandes (POR)	8
Third place
Gabriel Shelly (IRL)	6
Wang Yi (CHN)	2
