= Fernando Ferreira =

Fernando Ferreira can refer to:

- Fernando Ferreira (boccia), Portuguese Paralympic medalist in boccia
- Fernando Ferreira (cyclist) (born 1952), Portuguese cyclist
- Fernando Ferreira (footballer) (born 1986), Portuguese footballer
- Fernando Ferreira (high jumper) (born 1994), Brazilian high jumper

== See also ==
- Fernando Fonseca (born 1997), full name Fernando Manuel Ferreira Fonseca, Brazilian footballer
- Fernanda Ferreira (disambiguation)
