= Boccia at the 1996 Summer Paralympics =

Boccia at the X Paralympic Games
- Paralympic Boccia
- Competitors: 64 from 14 nations

Paralympic symbol (1994-2004)

Boccia at the 1996 Summer Paralympics consisted of five events. All events were mixed, meaning that men and women competed together.

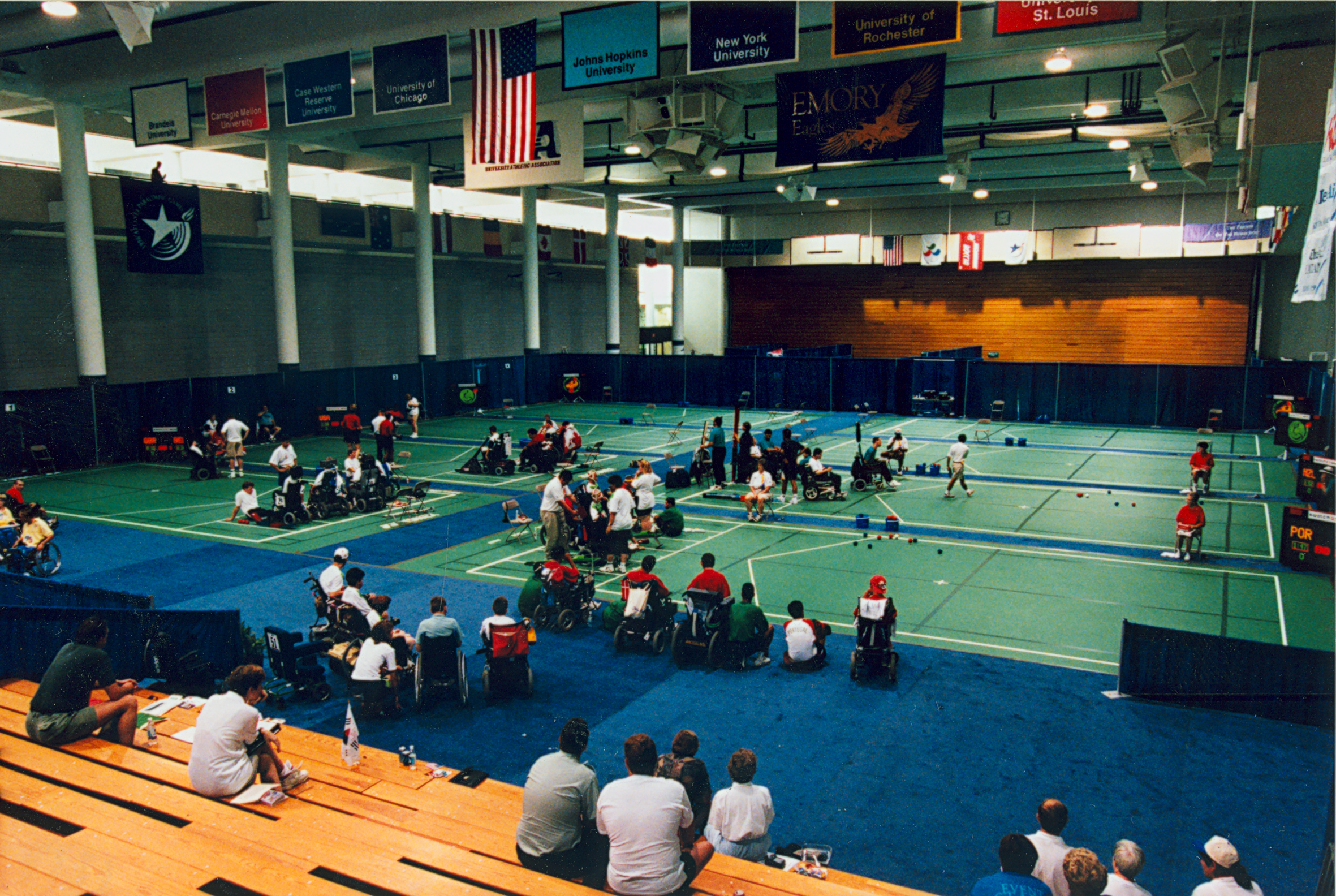
Boccia view of venue at the 1996 Paralympic Games

The 1996 Games marked the first year of separate competition for boccia players using an assistive device; a ramp or chute for delivering the balls onto the court. This group of very severely physically impaired athletes, unable to propel balls onto court using their limbs, would later become the separate BC3 classification.

== Medal table ==
Rank	Nation	Gold	Silver	Bronze	Total
1	Spain (ESP)	2	1	1	4
2	Portugal (POR)	2	1	0	3
3	South Korea (KOR)	1	0	1	2
4	Denmark (DEN)	0	1	0	1
4	Great Britain (GBR)	0	1	0	1
4	Ireland (IRL)	0	1	0	1
7	Australia (AUS)	0	0	1	1
7	Belgium (BEL)	0	0	1	1
7	United States (USA)	0	0	1	1
Totals (9 entries)		5	5	5	15

=== Participating nations ===
- Australia (6)
- Austria (4)
- Belgium (2)
- Canada (6)
- Denmark (4)
- Great Britain (6)
- Ireland (4)
- New Zealand (2)
- Norway (4)
- Portugal (6)
- South Korea (4)
- Spain (6)
- Sweden (4)
- United States (6)

== Medal summary ==
Event	Gold	Silver	Bronze
Individual C1 with assistive device	José Macedo; Portugal	Yolanda Martin; Spain	Paul Driesen; Belgium
Individual C1	Kim Hae-ryung; South Korea	Henrik Jorgensen; Denmark	Steven Thompson; United States
Individual C2	Maria Rodriguez; Spain	Thomas Leahy; Ireland	Jésus Fraile; Spain
Pairs C1 with assistive device	Portugal (POR); José Macedo; Armando Costa	Great Britain (GBR); Zoe Edge; Joyce Carle	Australia (AUS); Kris Bignall; Tu Huyhn
Team C1-C2	Spain (ESP); Antonio Cid; Miguel Gomez; Jesus Fraile; Maria Rodriguez	Portugal (POR); Pedro Silva; António Marques; Fernando Ferreira; João Alves	South Korea (KOR); Kim Joon; Yoo Won-jeong; Kim Hae-ryung; Jeong Yu-seok
