= Portugal at the 2020 Summer Paralympics =

- IPC code: POR
- NPC: Paralympic Committee of Portugal
- Website: www.comiteparalimpicoportugal.pt (in Portuguese and English)

in Tokyo
- Competitors: 33 in 8 sports
- Medals: Gold 0 Silver 0 Bronze 2 Total 2

Summer Paralympics appearances (overview)
- 1972; 1976–1980; 1984; 1988; 1992; 1996; 2000; 2004; 2008; 2012; 2016; 2020; 2024

Portugal competed at the 2020 Summer Paralympics in Tokyo, Japan, from 24 August to 5 September 2021.

== Medalists ==
Medal	Name	Sport	Event	Date
Bronze	Miguel Monteiro	Athletics	Men's shot put F40	29 August
Bronze	Norberto Mourão	Paracanoeing	Men's VL2	4 September

== Athletics ==
Ten Portuguese athletes have all qualified to compete.

Men's track

Athlete	Event	Heats		Final	
Athlete	Event	Result	Rank	Result	Rank
Sandro Baessa	400m T20	49.86	4 q	48.79	7
Sandro Baessa	1500m T20	—N/a		4:05.50	12
João Correia	100m T51	—N/a		24.37	6
Manuel Mendes	Marathon T46	—N/a		2:45:11	8
Cristiano Pereira	1500m T20	—N/a		4:05.10	11
Hélder Mestre	100m T51	—N/a		24.72	7
Hélder Mestre	200m T51	—N/a		42.75	6

Men's field

Athlete	Event	Final	
Athlete	Event	Result	Rank
Miguel Monteiro	Shot put F40	10.76	3rd place, bronze medalist(s)

Women's track

Athlete	Event	Heats		Final	
Athlete	Event	Result	Rank	Result	Rank
Odete Fiúza	Marathon T12	—N/a		3:20:45	6
Carina Paim	400m T20	59.43	2 Q	58.83	4

Women's field

Athlete	Event	Final	
Athlete	Event	Result	Rank
Ana Filipe	Long jump T20	5.16	6
Cláudia Santos	Long jump T20	4.89	9

== Badminton ==
Beatriz Monteiro has qualified to compete.

Athlete	Event	Group Stage				Quarterfinal	Semifinal	Final / BM	
Athlete	Event	Opposition Score	Opposition Score	Opposition Score	Rank	Opposition Score	Opposition Score	Opposition Score	Rank
Beatriz Monteiro	Women's singles SU5	Hollander (NED); W (21–12, 21–19)	Yang (CHN); L (10–21, 9–21)	Asiimwe (UGA); W (21–2, 21–5)	2 Q	Sugino (JPN); L (5–21, 12–21)	Did not advance		

== Boccia ==
Ten boccia players have qualified to compete.

== Cycling ==
Portugal sent two male cyclists to compete.

== Equestrian ==
Portugal sent one athlete after being qualified.

== Judo ==
Djibrilo Iafa has qualified to compete in the under 73kg class.

== Paracanoeing ==
Norberto Mourão and Alex Santos have both qualified.

== Swimming ==
Diogo Cancela, David Grachat, Marco Meneses, Ivo Rocha, Daniel Videira and Susana Veiga have all qualified to compete.

== See also ==
- Portugal at the Paralympics
- Portugal at the 2020 Summer Olympics
