= Fernanda Ferreira =

Fernanda Ferreira may refer to:

- Fernanda Ferreira (volleyball player)
- Fernanda Ferreira (psychologist)
- Fernanda Ferreira (rower)

== See also ==
- Fernando Ferreira (disambiguation)
