= Portugal at the 1972 Summer Paralympics =

- IPC code: POR
- NPC: Paralympic Committee of Portugal
- Website: www.comiteparalimpicoportugal.pt (in Portuguese and English)

in Heidelberg
- Competitors: 11
- Medals: Gold 0 Silver 0 Bronze 0 Total 0

Summer Paralympics appearances (overview)
- 1972; 1976–1980; 1984; 1988; 1992; 1996; 2000; 2004; 2008; 2012; 2016; 2020; 2024

Portugal made their Summer Paralympics debut at the 1972 Summer Paralympics in Heidelberg, West Germany. Eleven competitors from Portugal competed (only its men's wheelchair basketball team). They were eliminated on the first round with 1 win and 3 losses.

== See also ==
- Portugal at the Paralympics
- Portugal at the 1972 Summer Olympics
