= Swimming at the 2008 Summer Paralympics – Women's 100 metre breaststroke SB8 =

Women's 100m Breaststroke SB8 at the XIII Paralympic Games
- Venue: Beijing National Aquatics Center
- Dates: 9 September
- Competitors: 14 from 11 nations
- Winning time: 1:20.58

Medalists
| 1st place, gold medalist(s) | | Olesya Vladykina | Russia |
| 2nd place, silver medalist(s) | | Paulina Wozniak | Poland |
| 3rd place, bronze medalist(s) | | Claire Cashmore | Great Britain |

The women's 100m breaststroke SB8 event at the 2008 Summer Paralympics took place at the Beijing National Aquatics Center on 9 September. There were two heats; the swimmers with the eight fastest times advanced to the final.

== Results ==
=== Heats ===
Competed from 10:44.

==== Heat 1 ====
| Rank | Name | Nationality | Time | Notes |
|---|---|---|---|---|
| 1 | Olesya Vladykina | Russia | 1:23.40 | Q, PR |
| 2 | Claire Cashmore | Great Britain | 1:25.19 | Q |
| 3 | Manami Nomura | Japan | 1:27.15 | Q |
| 4 | Joana Calado | Portugal | 1:28.46 | Q |
| 5 | Leila Marques | Portugal | 1:29.99 | Q |
| 6 | Jiang Shengnan | China | 1:32.90 | |
| 7 | Ana Srsen | Croatia | 1:39.28 | |

==== Heat 2 ====
| Rank | Name | Nationality | Time | Notes |
|---|---|---|---|---|
| 1 | Paulina Wozniak | Poland | 1:25.47 | Q |
| 2 | Ellen Keane | Ireland | 1:27.61 | Q |
| 3 | Ester Rodriguez | Spain | 1:31.70 | Q |
| 4 | Brittany Gray | Canada | 1:32.86 | |
| 5 | Katerina Komarkova | Czech Republic | 1:33.97 | |
| 6 | Katarina Roxon | Canada | 1:34.59 | |
| 7 | Chen Zhonglan | China | 1:35.87 | |

=== Final ===
Source: Competed at 20:11.

| Rank | Name | Nationality | Time | Notes |
|---|---|---|---|---|
| 1st place, gold medalist(s) | Olesya Vladykina | Russia | 1:20.58 | WR |
| 2nd place, silver medalist(s) | Paulina Wozniak | Poland | 1:23.90 | |
| 3rd place, bronze medalist(s) | Claire Cashmore | Great Britain | 1:25.60 | |
| 4 | Manami Nomura | Japan | 1:25.87 | |
| 5 | Joana Calado | Portugal | 1:28.53 | |
| 6 | Ellen Keane | Ireland | 1:29.72 | |
| 7 | Leila Marques | Portugal | 1:30.11 | |
