= China National Convention Center =

Building in Beijing, China

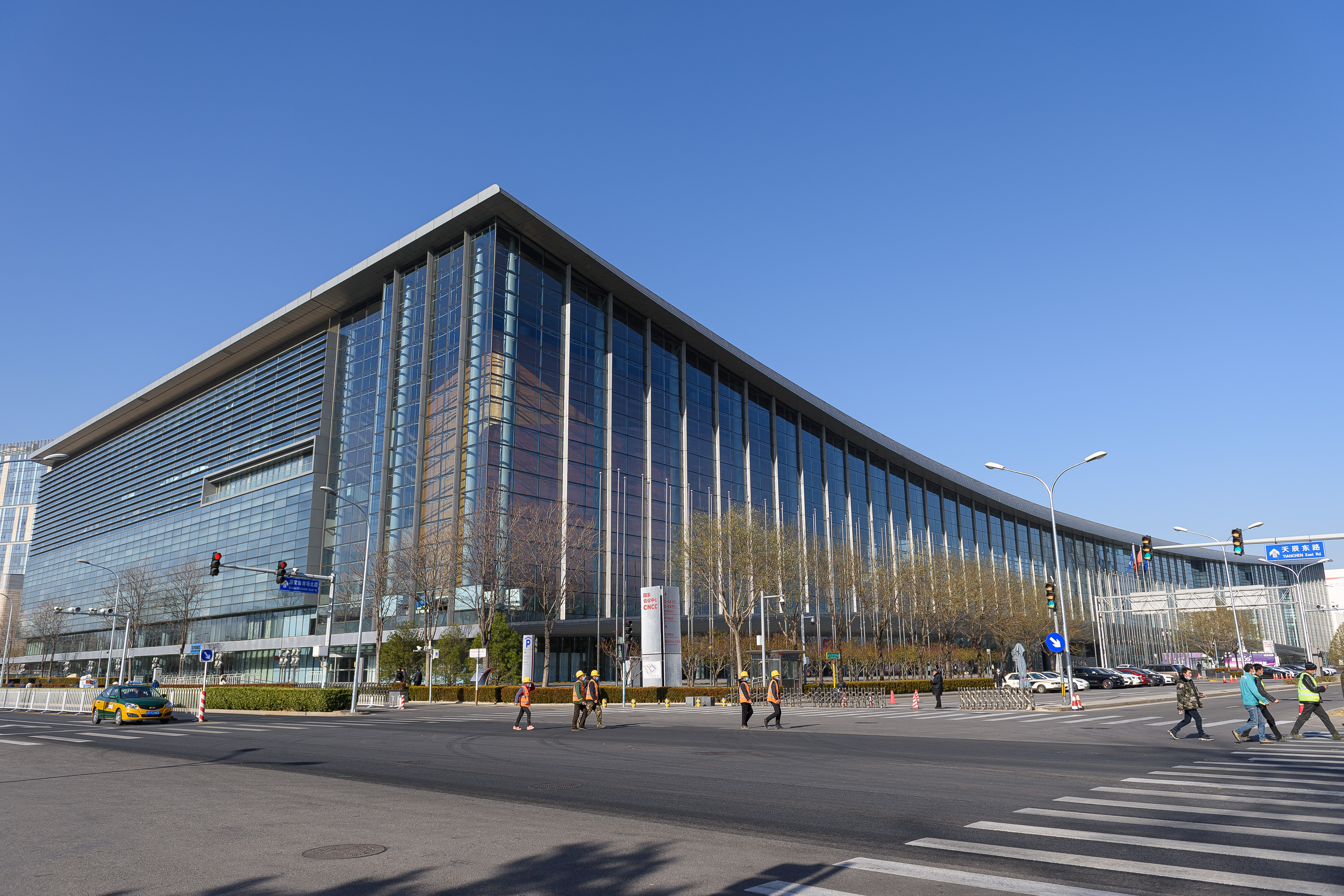
- China National Convention Center Phase 1 in 2021
- Former names: Beijing Olympic Green Convention Center

General information
- Type: Mixed use
- Architectural style: Postmodern
- Location: Beijing, China, No.7 Tianchen East Road, Chaoyang District
- Coordinates: 39°59′53.46″N 116°23′01.22″E
- Opened: 2008
- Operator: CNCC

Technical details
- Floor count: 8; 2 below ground
- Floor area: 270,000 m^{2} (2,900,000 sq ft)

Design and construction
- Architect: RMJM
- Structural engineer: Arup
- Main contractor: Beijing North Star

Website
- cnccchina

The China National Convention Center, previously known as the Olympic Green Convention Center (simplified Chinese: 国家会议中心; traditional Chinese: 國家會議中心; pinyin: Guójiā Huìyì Zhōngxīn) is a convention center located in the Olympic Green in Beijing.

== History ==
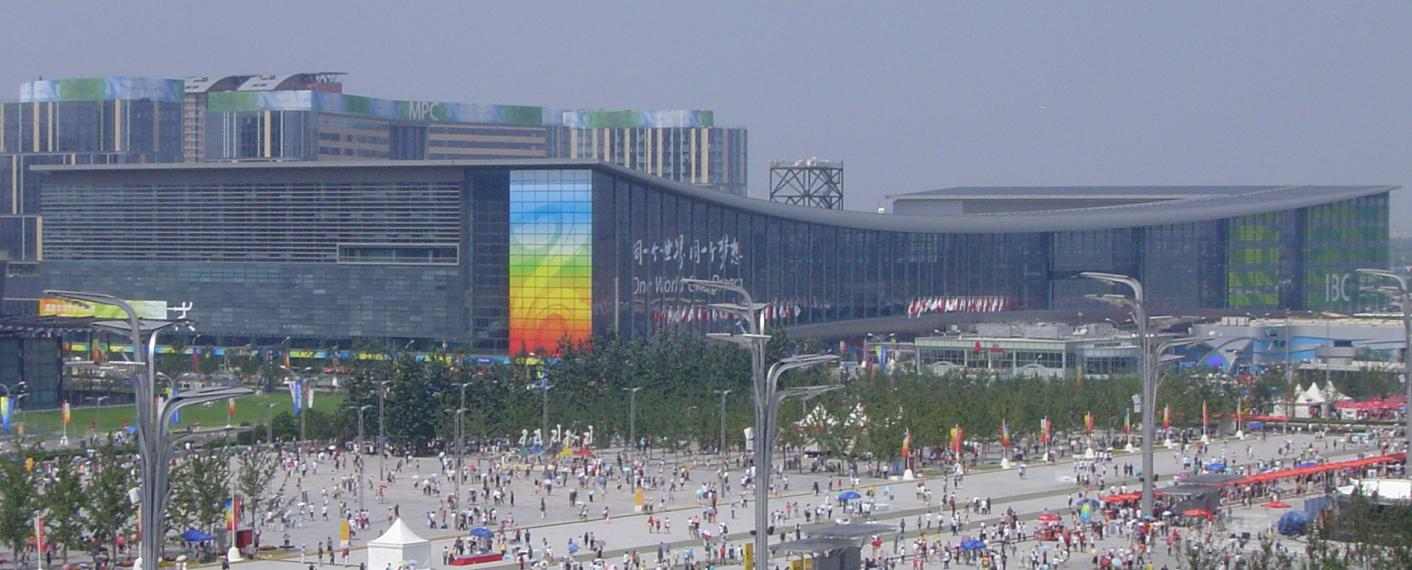
The fencing hall at the 2008 Summer Olympics.

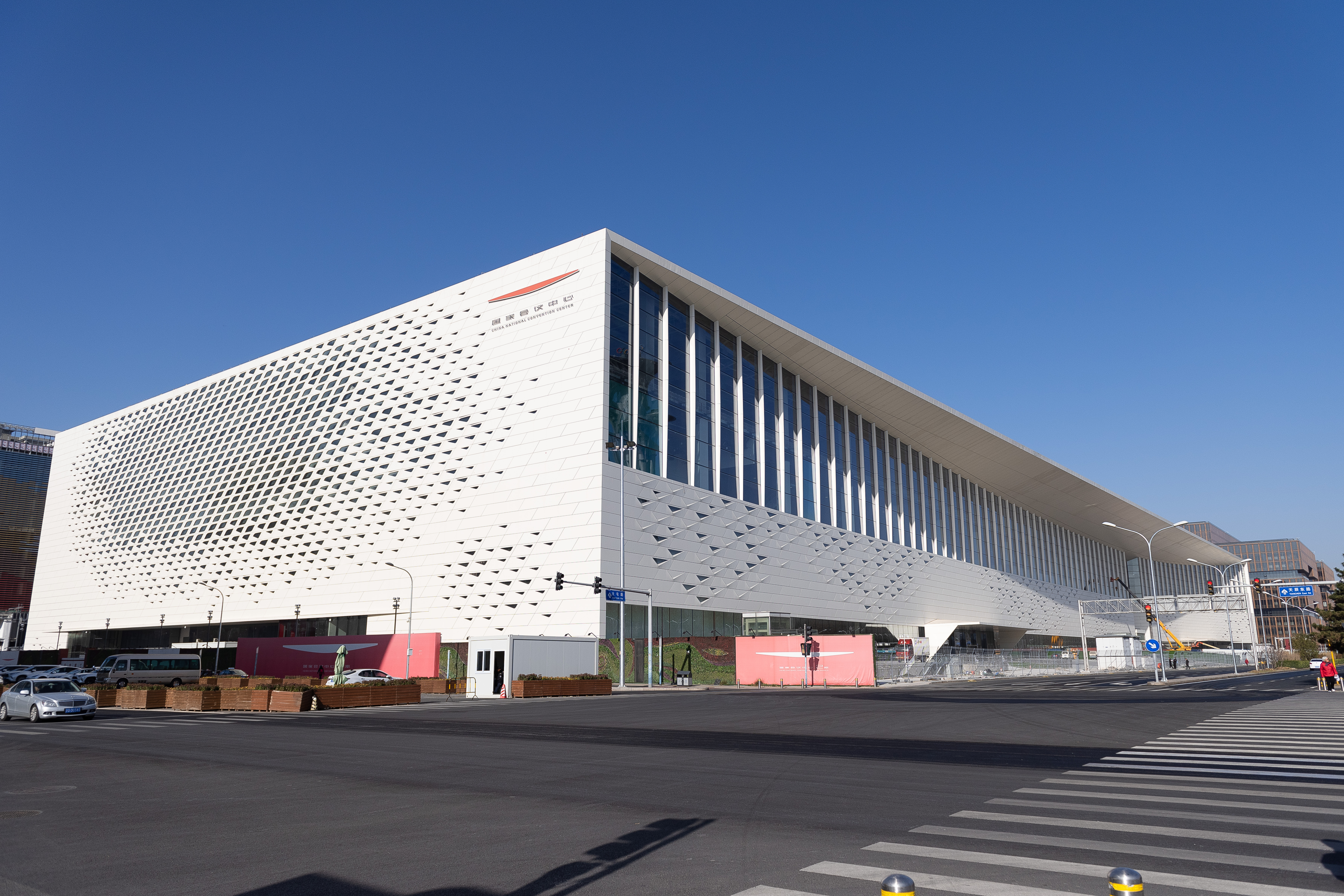
China National Convention Center Phase 2

It was designed by RMJM and was originally used for the 2008 Summer Olympics and Paralympics. It covers an area of 270,000 square metres. It was one of the four principal buildings of the Olympic Green.

The convention center served as the competition spot for the fencing, and the shooting and fencing parts of the modern pentathlon events in the 2008 Summer Olympics and the boccia and wheelchair fencing events at the 2008 Summer Paralympics.

The International Broadcast Centre was located in this venue. and was used again for the 2022 Winter Olympics.

China National Convention Center during 2008 Beijing Summer Olympic Games

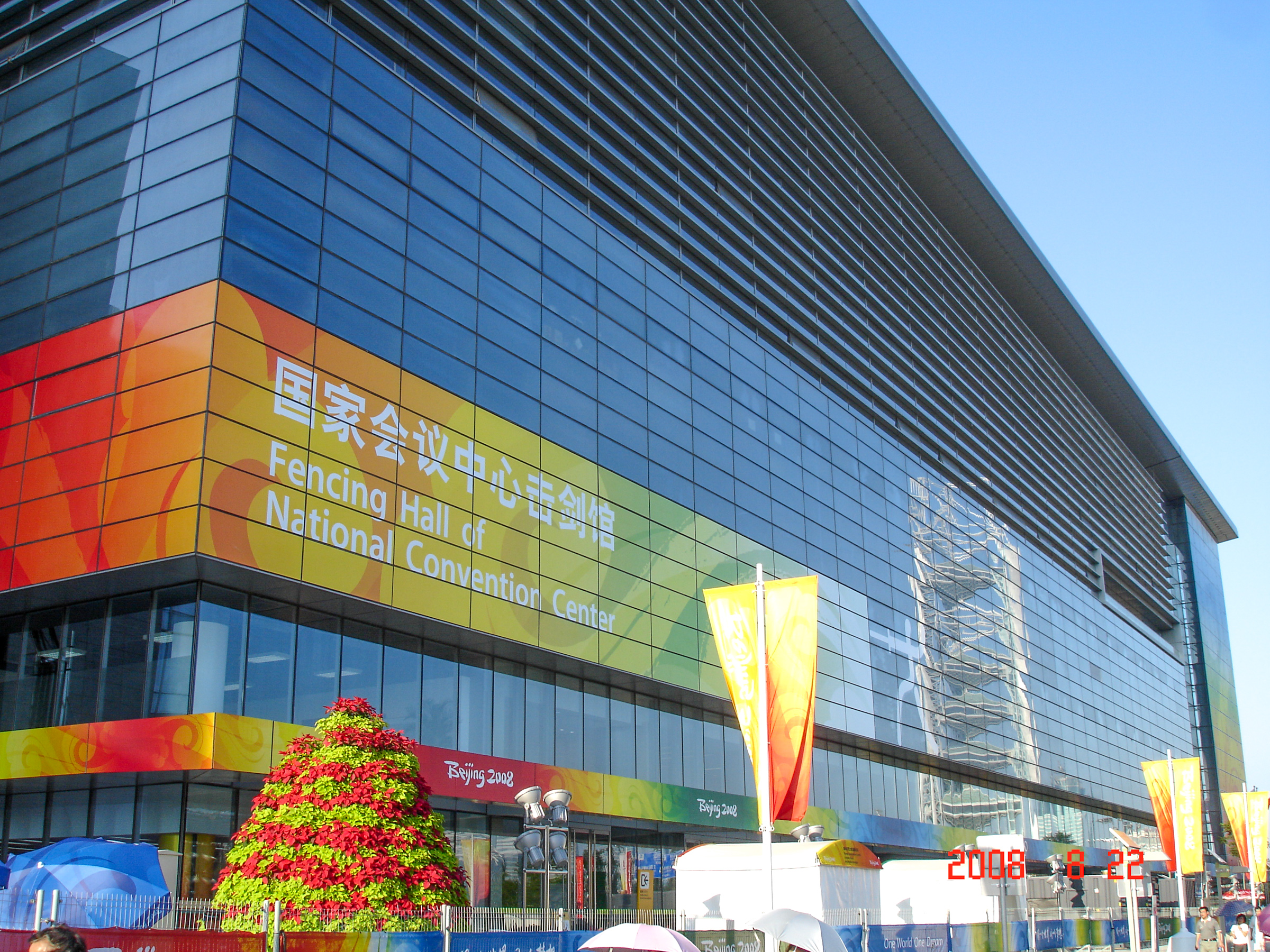
Fencing hall section

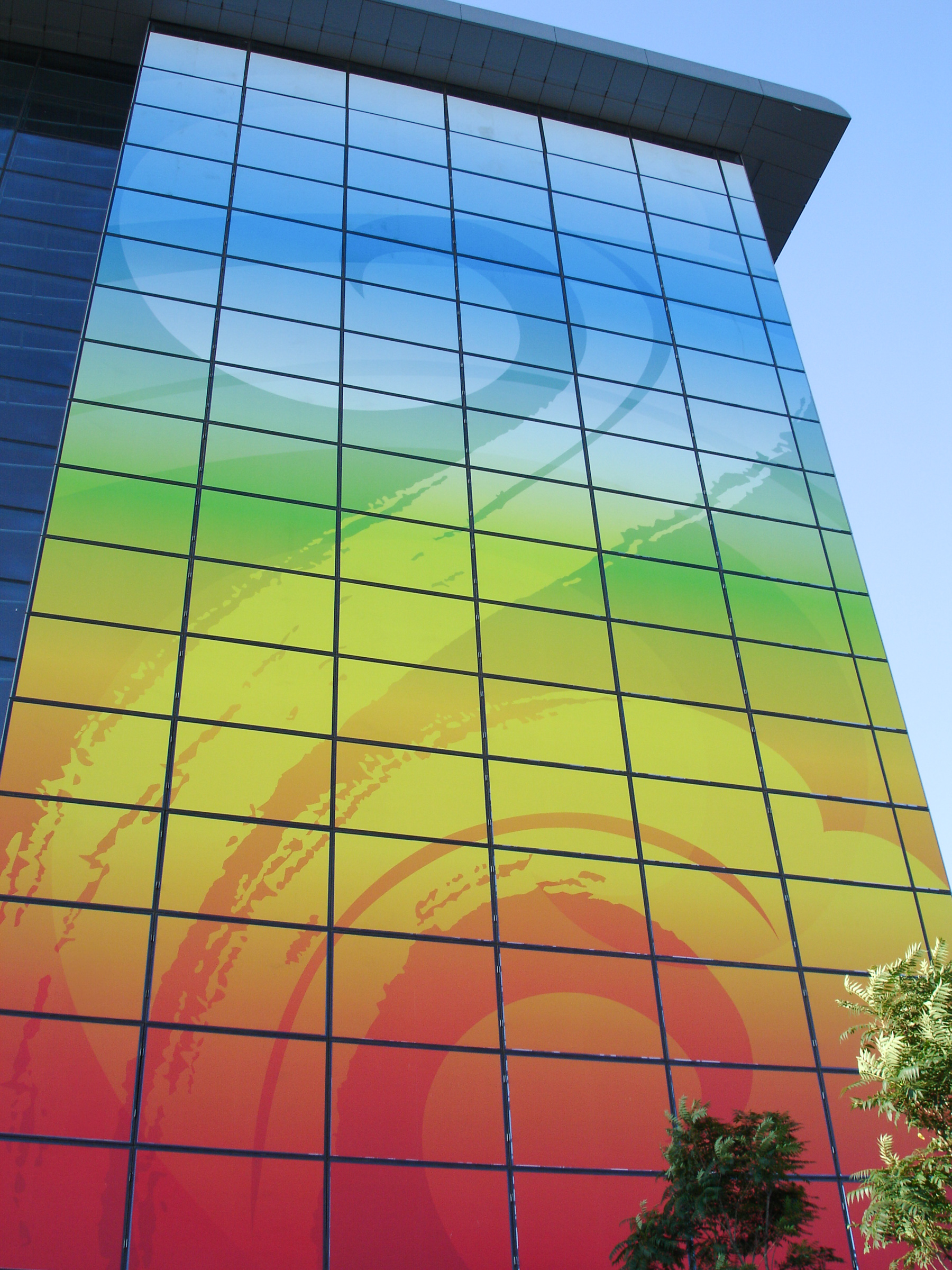
Fencing hall section

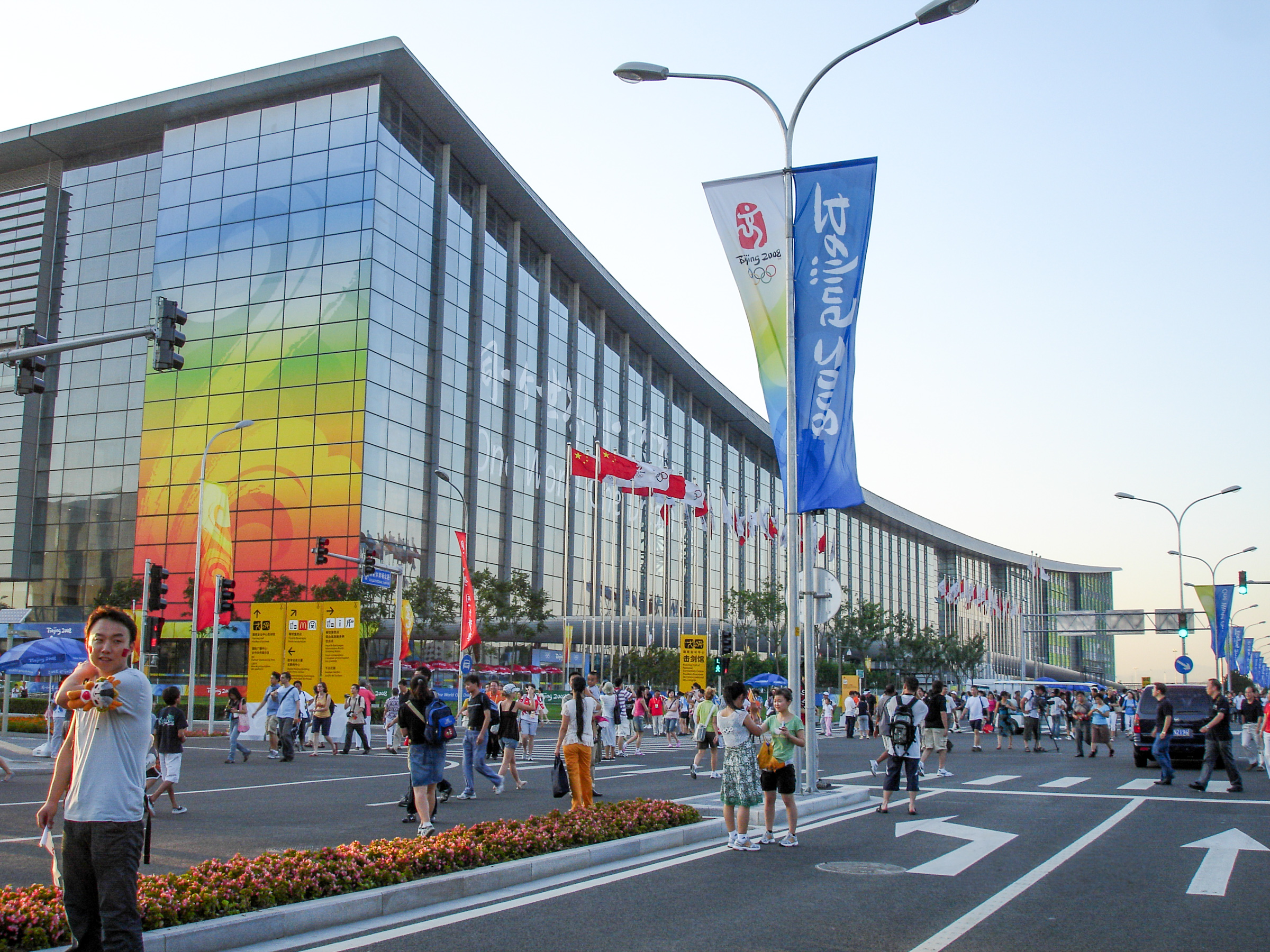
Fencing hall section

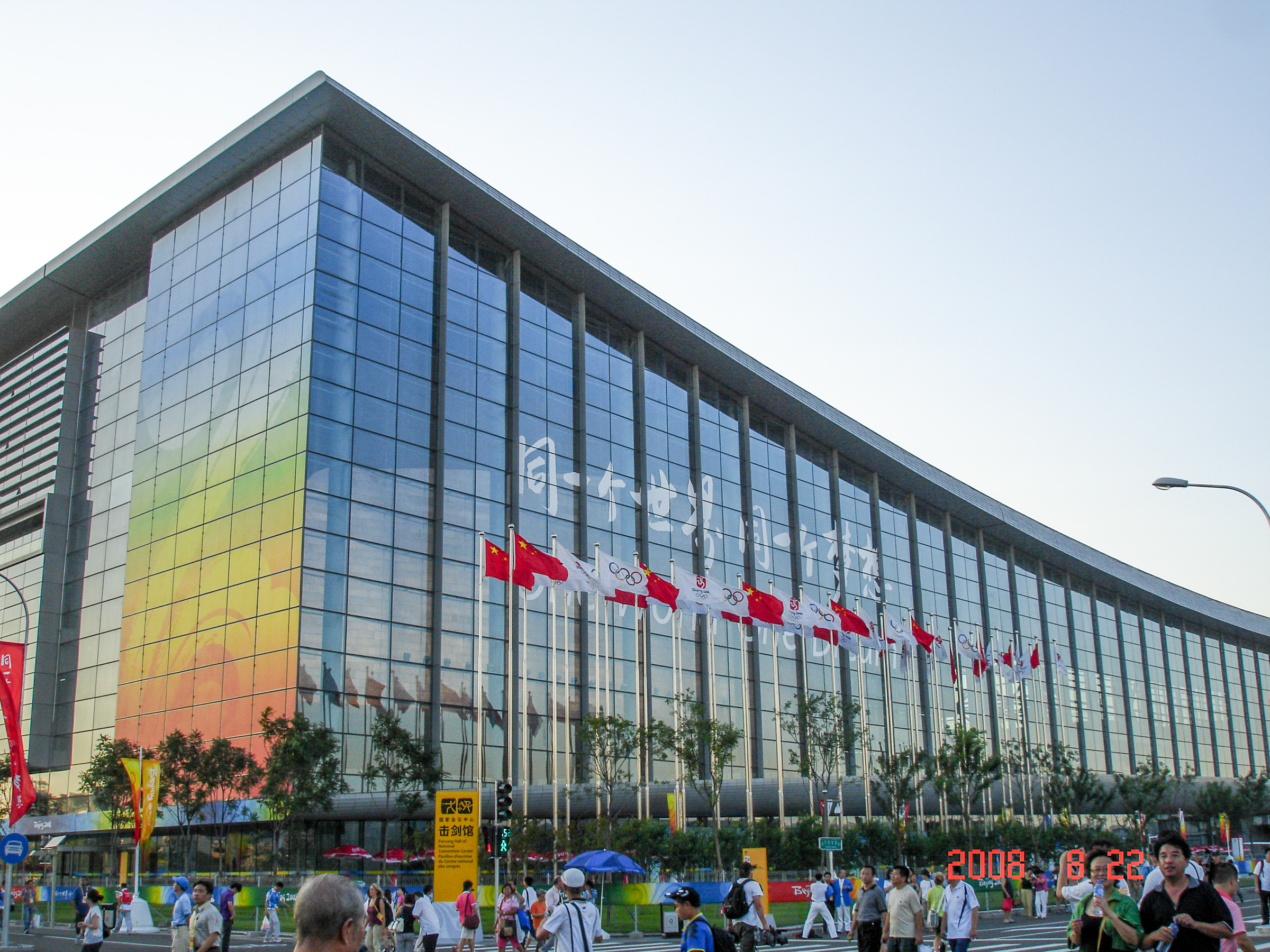
Fencing hall section

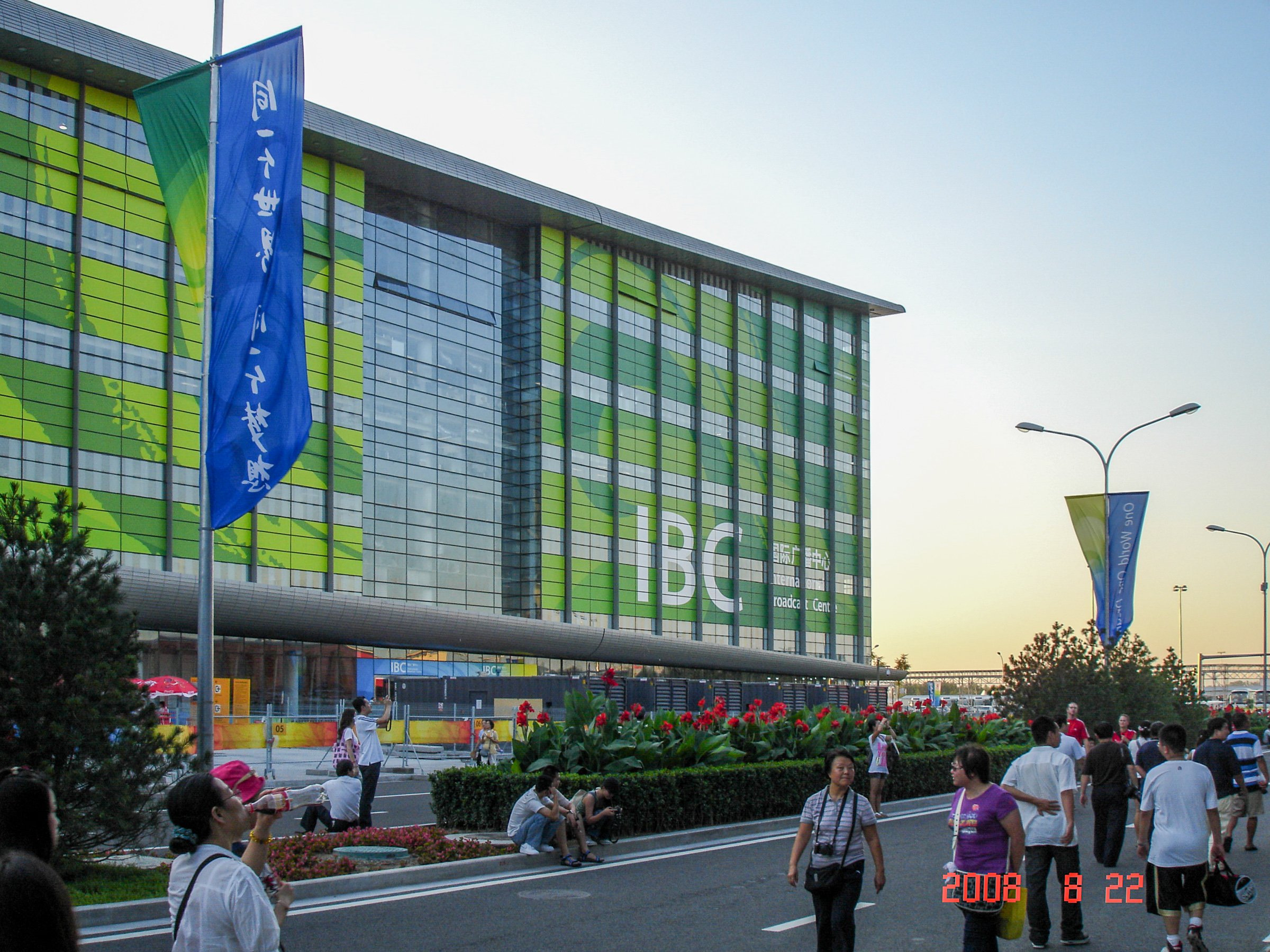
IBC section

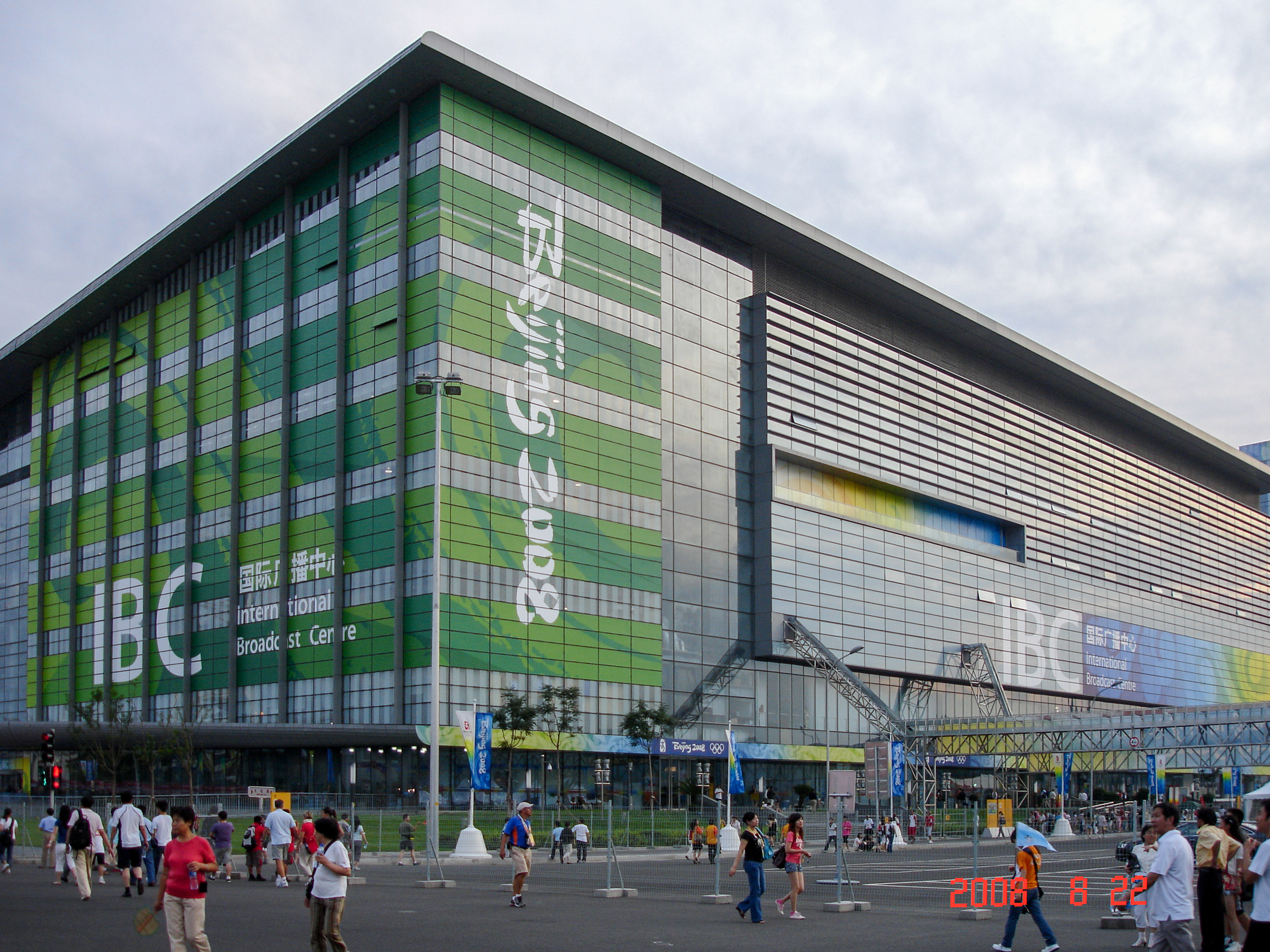
IBC section

== Transportation ==
The nearest subway station is Aolinpike Gongyuan (Olympic Park) station (exit E) on Line 8 and Line 15 of Beijing Subway.
