= María Hilda Rodríguez Rodríguez =

Spanish boccia player (born 1955)

Personal information
- Nationality: Spanish

Sport
- Country: Spain
- Sport: Boccia
Medal record
Boccia
Representing Spain
Paralympic Games

Maria Hilda Rodriguez Rodriguez (born May 10, 1955, in Lugo) is a boccia player from Spain. She has a physical disability: She has cerebral palsy and is a BC2 type athlete. She competed at the 1996 Summer Paralympics. She finished first in the BC1/BC2 team event. She finished first in the BC2 one person event.
