= Portugal at the 1992 Summer Paralympics =

- IPC code: POR
- NPC: Paralympic Committee of Portugal
- Website: www.comiteparalimpicoportugal.pt (in Portuguese and English)

in Barcelona
- Competitors: 30
- Medals Ranked 32nd: Gold 3 Silver 6 Bronze 5 Total 14

Summer Paralympics appearances (overview)
- 1972; 1976–1980; 1984; 1988; 1992; 1996; 2000; 2004; 2008; 2012; 2016; 2020; 2024

Portugal competed at the 1992 Summer Paralympics in Barcelona, Spain. 30 competitors from Portugal won 9 medals including 3 gold, 3 silver and 3 bronze and finished joint 29th in the medal table with Cuba.

In Madrid Paralympics games Potugal has 5 medals with from 2 silver,3 bronze medal has in medal table

== See also ==
- Portugal at the Paralympics
- Portugal at the 1992 Summer Olympics
