= Miguel Ángel Gómez Garro =

Spanish boccia player

Personal information
- Nationality: Spanish

Sport
- Country: Spain
- Sport: Boccia
Medal record
Boccia
Representing Spain
Paralympic Games

Miguel Angel Gomez Garro (born February 24, 1961, in Guipúzcoa) is a boccia player from Spain. He has a physical disability: He has cerebral palsy and is a BC1 type athlete. He competed at the 1996 Summer Paralympics. He finished first in the BC1/BC2 team event.
