= Portugal at the 1988 Summer Paralympics =

- IPC code: POR
- NPC: Paralympic Committee of Portugal
- Website: www.comiteparalimpicoportugal.pt (in Portuguese and English)

in Seoul
- Competitors: 13
- Medals Ranked 29th: Gold 3 Silver 5 Bronze 6 Total 14

Summer Paralympics appearances (overview)
- 1972; 1976–1980; 1984; 1988; 1992; 1996; 2000; 2004; 2008; 2012; 2016; 2020; 2024

Portugal competed at the 1988 Summer Paralympics in Seoul, South Korea. 13 competitors from Portugal won 14 medals including 3 gold, 5 silver and 6 bronze and finished 28th in the medal table.

== See also ==
- Portugal at the Paralympics
- Portugal at the 1988 Summer Olympics
