= Portugal at the 1984 Summer Paralympics =

- IPC code: POR
- NPC: Paralympic Committee of Portugal
- Website: www.comiteparalimpicoportugal.pt (in Portuguese and English)

in Stoke Mandeville/New York
- Competitors: 17
- Medals Ranked 26th: Gold 4 Silver 3 Bronze 7 Total 14

Summer Paralympics appearances (overview)
- 1972; 1976–1980; 1984; 1988; 1992; 1996; 2000; 2004; 2008; 2012; 2016; 2020; 2024

Portugal competed at the 1984 Summer Paralympics in Stoke Mandeville, Great Britain, and New York City, United States. Seventeen competitors from Portugal won 14 medals including 4 gold, 3 silver and 7 bronze and finished 26th in the medal table.

== See also ==
- Portugal at the Paralympics
- Portugal at the 1984 Summer Olympics
