= Boccia at the 2008 Summer Paralympics =

Boccia at the XIII Paralympic Games
- Paralympic Boccia
- Venue: Beijing National Convention Center
- Dates: 7–12 September 2008

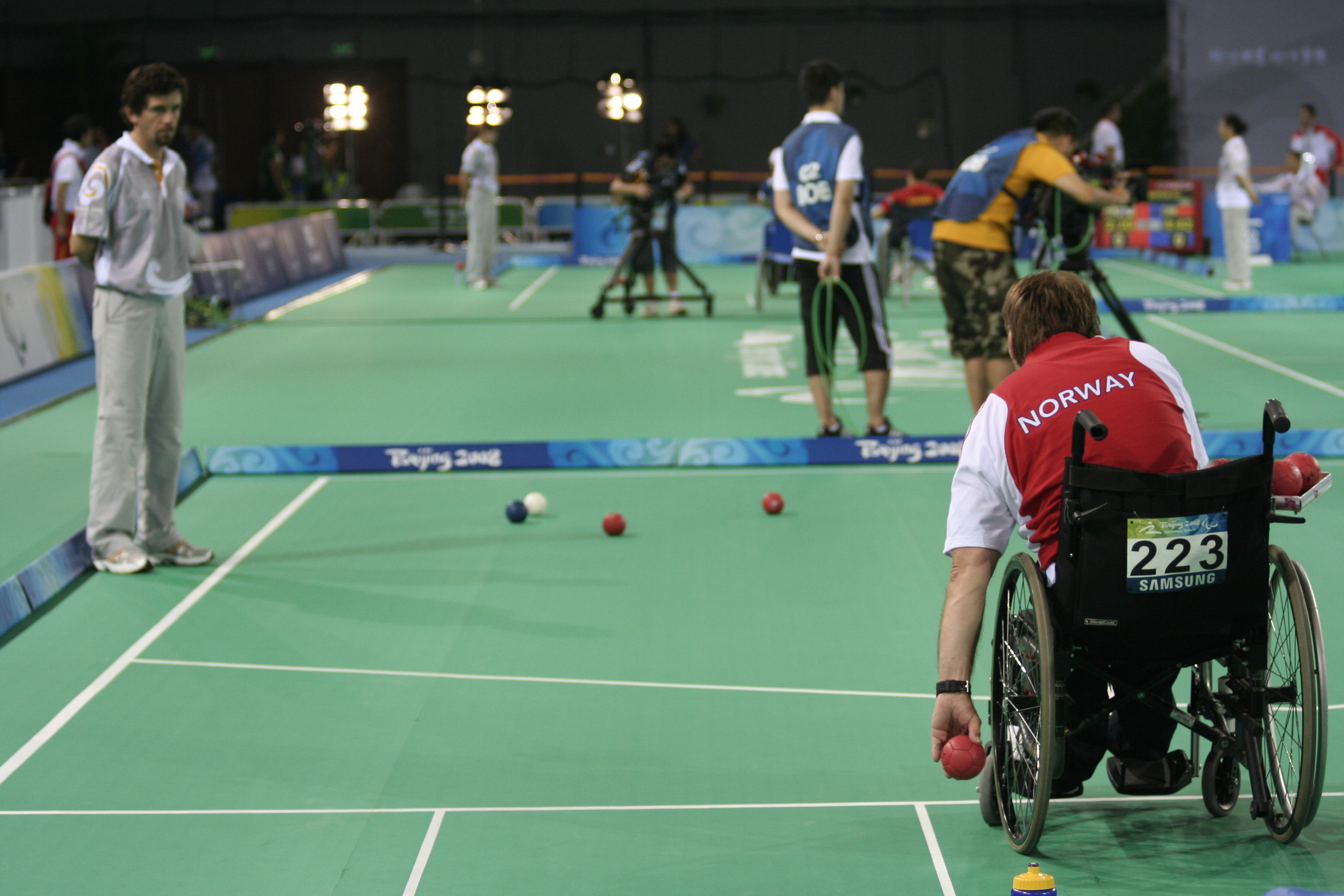
Norway's John Nørsterud at the Boccia events

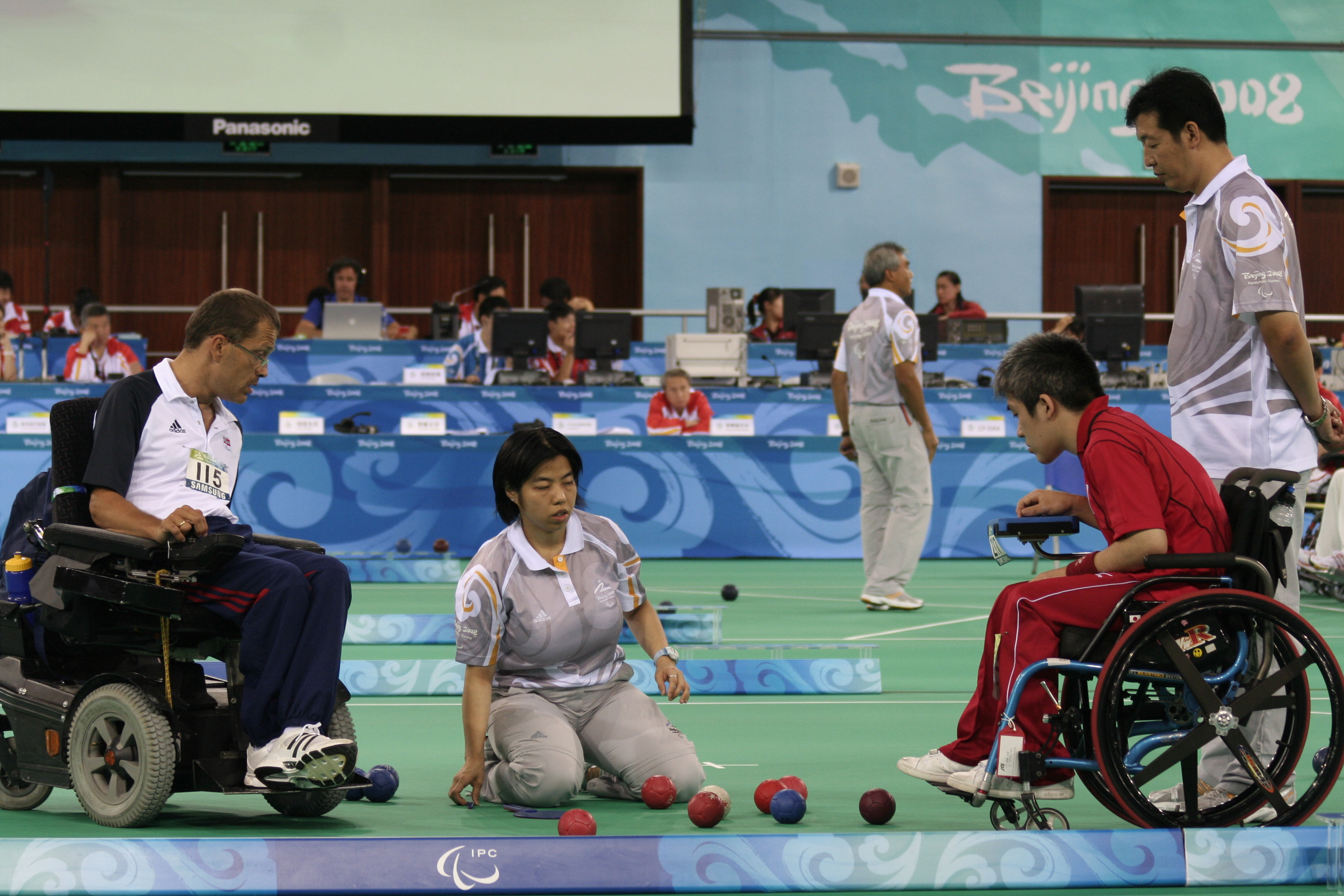
Norway's Roger Aandalen (blue/white) vs Japan's Takayuki Hirose (red).

Boccia at the 2008 Summer Paralympics consisted of seven events. The competitions were held in the Beijing National Convention Center from September 7 to September 12.

== Classification ==
Boccia players were given a classification depending on the type and extent of their disability. The classification system allows players to compete against others with a similar level of function. The boccia classifications were BC1 through BC4.

== Events ==
For each of the events below, medals were contested for one or more of the above classifications. All events were mixed, meaning that men and women competed together.

- Mixed singles
  - BC1
  - BC2
  - BC3
  - BC4
- Mixed team
  - BC1–2
- Mixed pairs
  - BC3
  - BC4

== Participating countries ==
There were 88 athletes taking part in this sport.

- Argentina (4)
- Brazil (2)
- Canada (7)
- China (9)
- Czech Republic (2)
- Finland (3)
- Great Britain (4)
- Greece (3)
- Hong Kong (6)
- Hungary (2)
- Ireland (4)
- Japan (4)
- New Zealand (7)
- Norway (3)
- Portugal (9)
- Slovakia (2)
- South Korea (4)
- Spain (9)
- Thailand (3)
- United States (1)

== Medal summary ==
=== Medal table ===
This ranking sorts countries by the number of gold medals earned by their players (in this context a country is an entity represented by a National Paralympic Committee). The number of silver medals is taken into consideration next and then the number of bronze medals. If, after the above, countries are still tied, equal ranking is given and they are listed alphabetically.

Rank	Nation	Gold	Silver	Bronze	Total
1	Brazil (BRA)	2	0	1	3
1	South Korea (KOR)	2	0	1	3
3	Portugal (POR)	1	3	1	5
4	Great Britain (GBR)	1	1	0	2
4	Hong Kong (HKG)	1	1	0	2
6	Spain (ESP)	0	1	2	3
7	Greece (GRE)	0	1	0	1
8	Czech Republic (CZE)	0	0	1	1
8	Ireland (IRL)	0	0	1	1
Totals (9 entries)		7	7	7	21

=== Medalists ===
Event	Gold	Silver	Bronze
Individual BC1	João Paulo Fernandes; Portugal	António Marques; Portugal	Gabriel Shelly; Ireland
Individual BC2	Hoi Ying Karen Kwok; Hong Kong	Nigel Murray; Great Britain	Manuel Ángel Martín; Spain
Individual BC3	Park Keon-woo; South Korea	Grigorios Polychronidis; Greece	Jeong Ho-won; South Korea
Individual BC4	Dirceu Pinto; Brazil	Leung Yuk Wing; Hong Kong	Eliseu Santos; Brazil
Team BC1-2	Great Britain (GBR); Dan Bentley; Nigel Murray; Zoe Robinson; David Smith	Portugal (POR); João Paulo Fernandes; Fernando Ferreira; Cristina Gonçalves; António Marques	Spain (ESP); Francisco Javier Beltrán; Pedro Cordero; Manuel Ángel Martín; José Vaquerizo
Pairs BC3	South Korea (KOR); Jeong Ho-won; Park Keon-woo; Shin Bo-mee	Spain (ESP); Yolanda Martín; Santiago Pesquera; José Manuel Rodríguez Vazquez	Portugal (POR); Armando Costa; Mário Peixoto; Eunice Raimundo
Pairs BC4	Brazil (BRA); Dirceu Pinto; Eliseu Santos	Portugal (POR); Fernando Pereira; Bruno Valentim	Czech Republic (CZE); Ladislav Kratina; Radek Prochazka
