= Luís Silva (boccia) =

Portuguese boccia player

Luís Silva (born March 30, 1980) is a Paralympian boccia player who won a silver medal at the 2012 Paralympic Games in Mixed Pairs BC3 with Armando Costa and José Macedo.
