= Susana Barroso =

Susana Carvalheira Barroso
Personal information
- Full name: Susana Cristina Carvalheira Barroso
- Born: 10 June 1974 (age 52) Lisbon, Portugal

Sport
- Country: Portugal
- Sport: Paralympic swimming
- Disability: Charcot-Marie-Tooth disease
- Disability class: S3
Medal record
Paralympic swimming
Representing Portugal
Paralympic Games
Silver medal – second place	1996 Atlanta	Women's 50m freestyle S3
Silver medal – second place	1996 Atlanta	Women's 50m backstroke S3
Silver medal – second place	2000 Sydney	Women's 50m backstroke S3
Bronze medal – third place	1992 Barcelona	Women's 50m backstroke S3-4
Bronze medal – third place	1996 Atlanta	Women's 100m freestyle S3
Bronze medal – third place	2004 Athens	Women's 50m backstroke S3
World Championships
Gold medal – first place	1994 Malta	Women's 50m backstroke S3
Gold medal – first place	1994 Malta	Women's 50m freestyle S3
Silver medal – second place	1998 Christchurch	Women's 50m backstroke S3
Bronze medal – third place	1998 Christchurch	Women's 50m freestyle S3
Bronze medal – third place	1998 Christchurch	Women's 100m freestyle S3
Bronze medal – third place	2002 Mar del Plata	Women's 50m backstroke S3
Bronze medal – third place	2002 Mar del Plata	Women's 4x50m freestyle relay 20pts

Susana Cristina Carvalheira Barroso (born 10 June 1974) is a retired Portuguese Paralympic swimmer and boccia player who competes in international level events. She was the first Portuguese swimmers to win a medal in swimming at the Summer Paralympics and was the most medalled female Paralympian for her country.

Barroso had a fourteen-year swimming career starting in 1991 where she won a bronze medal in a European swimming championships for disabled swimmers and retired from swimming in 2005. She played boccia two years after her retirement and returned to the Paralympics eight years later at the 2012 Summer Paralympics when she competed in boccia where she did not medal in her event.
