= Manuel Mendes (athlete) =

Portuguese Paralympic athlete

Personal information
- Born: 28 November 1997 (age 28) Albufeira, Portugal

Sport
- Country: Portugal
- Sport: Para-athletics
- Disability: Amputated left arm
- Disability class: T46
Medal record
Men's para-athletics
Representing Portugal
Paralympic Games
Bronze medal – third place	2016 Rio de Janeiro	Marathon T46

Manuel Mendes is a Portuguese Paralympic athlete. He represented Portugal at the 2016 Summer Paralympics held in Rio de Janeiro, Brazil and he won the bronze medal in the men's marathon T46 event. In 2019, he qualified for the 2020 Summer Paralympics held in Tokyo, Japan after finishing in tenth place in his event at the 2019 London Marathon in London, United Kingdom. He competed in the men's marathon T46 event.
