= Diogo Cancela =

Portuguese swimmer (born 2002)

Personal information
- Born: 21 July 2002 (age 24) Coimbra, Portugal

Sport
- Sport: Swimming
- Classifications: S8
Medal record
Men's para-swimming
Representing Portugal
Paralympic Games
Bronze medal – third place	2024 Paris	200 m ind. medley SM8
European Championships
Bronze medal – third place	2026 Kocaeli	200 m ind. medley SM8
Bronze medal – third place	2026 Kocaeli	100 m Butterfly S8

Diogo Cancela (born 21 July 2002) is a Portuguese paralympic swimmer. He competed at the 2024 Summer Paralympics and won a bronze medal in the men's 200m individual medley SM8.
