= Paulo de Almeida Coelho =

Portuguese Paralympic athlete

Medal record

Representing Portugal

Paralympic Games
Gold medal – first place	1992 Barcelona	1500 m -B1
Gold medal – first place	1996 Atlanta	1500 m - T10
Gold medal – first place	1996 Atlanta	5000 m - T10
Gold medal – first place	2000 Sydney	1500 m - T11
Silver medal – second place	1992 Barcelona	5000 m - B1
Silver medal – second place	1996 Atlanta	800 m - T10
Bronze medal – third place	1992 Barcelona	800 m - B1

Paulo de Almeida Coelho, ComIH is a Paralympic track and field athlete from Portugal competing mainly in category T11 track running events.

He competed in the 1992 Summer Paralympics in Barcelona, Spain. There he won a gold medal in the men's 1500 metres T11 event, a silver medal in the men's 4 x 400 metre relay T11-T13 event and a bronze medal in the men's 5000 metres T10 event. He also competed at the 1996 Summer Paralympics in Atlanta, winning a gold medal in the men's 100 metres T13 event, a gold medal in the men's 5000 metres T10 event, a silver medal in the men's 5000 metres T10 event and finishing sixteenth in the men's 10000 metres T10 event. He also competed at the 2000 Summer Paralympics in Sydney, Australia, and won a gold medal in the men's 1500 metres T11 event. He competed in the 2004 Summer Paralympics in Athens, Greece. There, he finished fifth in the men's 1500 metres T11 event and finished seventh in the men's 5000 metres T10 event.
