= Maria Fernandes (Portuguese athlete) =

Portuguese Paralympic athlete

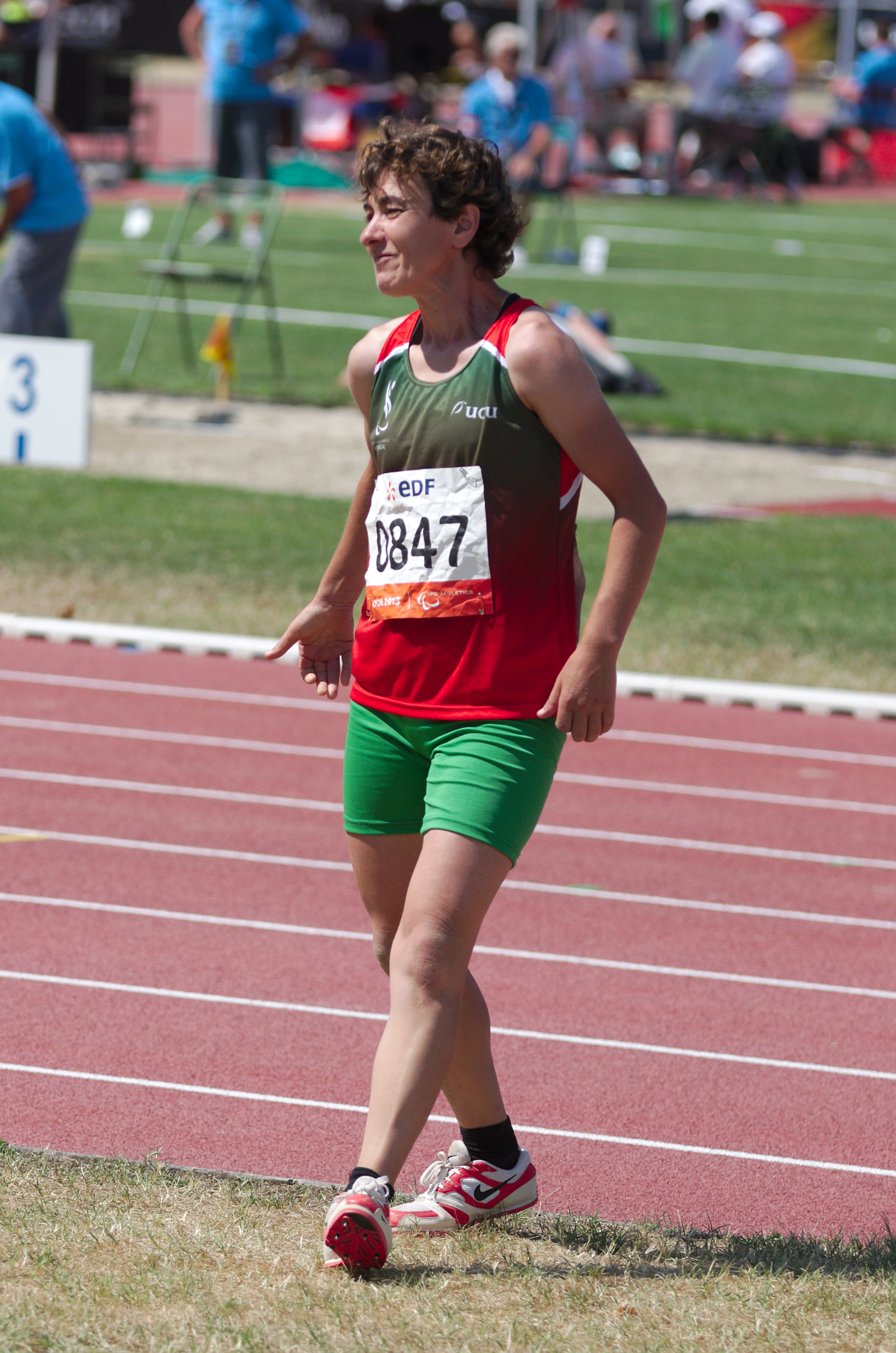

Personal information
- Nickname: Tica
- Nationality: Portuguese
- Born: 27 April 1969 (age 57)

Sport
- Country: Portugal
- Sport: Athletics
- Event(s): Long jump Sprint
- Club: Clube Gaia
- Coached by: Jose Costa Pereira

Achievements and titles
- Paralympic finals: 2000; 2008
Medal record
Representing Portugal
Paralympic Games
Bronze medal – third place	2000 Sydney	400m - T38
IPC Athletics World Championships
Bronze medal – third place	2013 Lyon	Long jump - T37/38

Maria Fernandes (born 27 April 1969) is a Paralympic athlete from Portugal. She mainly competes in category T38 sprint events.

Fernandes competed in the 2000 Summer Paralympics in Sydney, Australia. There she won a bronze medal in the women's 400 metres - T38 event, finished fifth in the women's 100 metres - T38 event and finished seventh in the women's 200 metres - T38 event. She also competed at the 2008 Summer Paralympics in Beijing, China, where she went out in the first round of the women's 100 metres - T38 event and finished eighth in the women's 200 metres - T38 event.

In 2013, Fernandes again represented Portugal when she attended the IPC Athletics World Championships in Lyon, France. There she entered the long jump, finishing third to take the bronze medal.
