= Carlos Lopes (parathlete) =

Portuguese paralympic athlete

Medal record

Paralympic athletics

Representing Portugal

Paralympic Games
Gold medal – first place	2000 Atlanta	400m - T11
Gold medal – first place	2000 Sydney	4x400m - T13
Bronze medal – third place	1996 Atlanta	400m - T10

Carlos Conceição Lopes, GOIH is a former Portuguese paralympian athlete who competed mainly in category T11 sprint events.

Lopes competed in the 1996 Summer Paralympics in Atlanta, United States. There he won a bronze medal in the men's 400 metres - T10 event, finished fourth in the men's 200 metres - T10 event and went out in the first round of the men's 800 metres - T10 event. He also competed at the 2000 Summer Paralympics in Sydney, Australia; he won a gold medal in the men's 4 x 400 metre relay - T13 event, a gold medal in the men's 400 metres - T11 event and finished fourth in the men's 200 metres - T11 event. He also competed at the 2004 Summer Paralympics in Athens, Greece; he finished seventh in the men's 100 metres - T11 event, did not finish in the men's 200 metres - T11 event and went out in the first round of the men's 4 x 400 metre relay - T11-13 event. He competed in the 2008 Summer Paralympics in Beijing, China. There, he went out in the quarter-finals of the men's 100 metres - T11 event and was a part of the Portuguese relay team that went out in the first round of the men's 4 x 400 metre relay - T11-T13 event

== Orders ==
- Grand Officer of the Order of Prince Henry
