= Gabriel Potra =

Portuguese Paralympic athlete

Medal record

Paralympic athletics

Representing Portugal

Paralympic Games
Gold medal – first place	2000 Sydney	200m – T12
Gold medal – first place	2000 Sydney	4 × 400 m – T13
Bronze medal – third place	2000 Sydney	100m – T12

IPC European Championships
Silver medal – second place	2012 Stadskanaal	4 × 100 m relay – T11–13
Silver medal – second place	2016 Grosseto	4 × 100 m relay – T11–13
Bronze medal – third place	2016 Grosseto	100m – T12

Gabriel Potra is a Paralympian athlete from Portugal. He mainly competes in category T12 sprint events.

He competed in the 2000 Summer Paralympics in Sydney, Australia. There he won a gold medal in the men's 200 metres – T12 event, a gold medal in the men's 4 × 400 metre relay – T13 event, a bronze medal in the men's 100 metres – T12 event and went out in the semi-finals of the men's 400 metres – T12 event. He also competed at the 2004 Summer Paralympics in Athens, Greece, went out in the semi-finals of the men's 200 metres – T12 event, went out in the first round of the men's 400 metres – T12 event and went out in the first round of the men's 4 × 100 metre relay – T11–13 event. He also competed at the 2008 Summer Paralympics in Beijing, China, went out in the semi-finals of the men's 200 metres – T12 event, was disqualified in the men's 4 × 100 metre relay – T11–13 event and finished twelfth in the men's pentathlon – P12 event
