= Cristina Gonçalves =

Portuguese boccia player

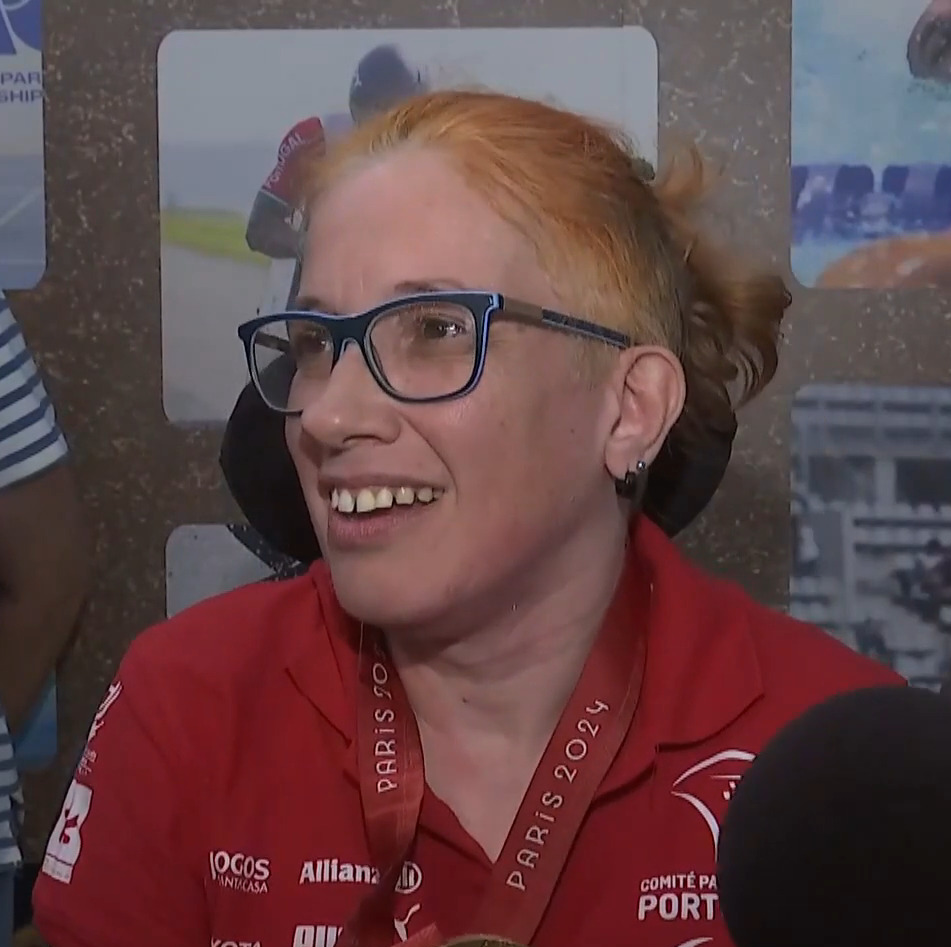
- Gonçalves in 2024

Personal information
- National team: Portugal
- Born: September 15, 1977 (age 48) Lisbon, Portugal

Sport
- Country: Portugal
- Sport: Boccia
- Disability: Cerebral palsy
- Disability class: BC2
- Team: APCL
- Coached by: Rosa Carvalho
Medal record
Boccia
Representing Portugal
Paralympic Games
Gold medal – first place	2004 Athens	Team BC1-2
Gold medal – first place	2024 Paris	Individual BC2
Silver medal – second place	2008 Beijing	Team BC1-2
Bronze medal – third place	2016 Rio de Janeiro	Team BC1-2

Cristina Gonçalves (born 15 September 1977) is a Portuguese boccia player. She has competed for her country at several Summer Paralympic Games and has won four medals, including two gold medals. She has cerebral palsy since contracting meningitis when she was 11 months old.

== Career ==
Cristina Gonçalves was born on 15 September 1977 in Lisbon, Portugal. When she was 11 months old, she contracted meningitis resulting in cerebral palsy. She began competing nationally in boccia in 1998, having taken up the sport at the age of 14. She is classified as BC2. Gonçalves' first overall victory came in 2003 in the boccia World Cup in New Zealand.

She attended her first Summer Paralympics in 2004 in Athens, Greece, where she won a gold medal as part of the team BC1-2 competition with a victory over New Zealand. She continued to compete at successive Paralympic Games, where she won a silver medal in the team event at the 2008 Summer Paralympics in Beijing, China, but failed to win a medal at the 2012 Games in London, England.

At the 2016 Summer Paralympics, she was the only female player on the mixed boccia team. They qualified out of the group stage following a loss to Argentina followed by victories over Slovakia and Brazil. They were beaten 8-5 by Japan in the semi-final, resulting in a rematch against Argentina in the bronze medal match. Despite the earlier 1–7 loss, they defeated Argentina 6–2 to win the bronze medal.
