= José Carlos Macedo =

Portuguese paralympic boccia player

José Macedo
Personal information
- Full name: José Carlos Macedo
- Born: 30 June 1972 (age 53) Braga, Portugal

Sport
- Country: Portugal
- Sport: Boccia
Medal record
Boccia
Representing Portugal
Paralympic Games
Gold medal – first place	1996 Atlanta	Mixed individual C1 wad
Gold medal – first place	1996 Atlanta	Mixed pairs C1 wad
Gold medal – first place	2000 Sydney	Mixed individual BC3
Silver medal – second place	2012 London	Mixed pairs BC3 bronze medal mixed individual bc3
Bronze medal – third place	2016 Rio de Janeiro	Individual BC3

José Carlos Macedo (born 30 June 1972) is a Portuguese paralympic boccia player. He competed at six Paralympic Games from 1996 to 2020, winning six medals including three golds.
