= António Marques =

Portuguese boccia player (born 1989)

Personal information
- Nationality: Portugal
- Born: 25 October 1963 (age 62) Penacova, Portugal

Sport
- Sport: Boccia
Medal record
Boccia
Representing Portugal
Paralympic Games
Gold medal – first place	1988 Seoul	Mixed Team C1-C2
Gold medal – first place	2004 Athens	Mixed Team BC1-BC2
Silver medal – second place	1996 Atlants	Mixed Team C1-C2
Silver medal – second place	2008 Beijing	Mixed Individual BC1
Silver medal – second place	2008 Beijing	Individual BC1
Bronze medal – third place	1988 Seoul	Men's Precision Throw C1
Bronze medal – third place	2000 Sydney	Mixed Team BC1-BC2
Bronze medal – third place	2016 Rio	Mixed Team BC1-2

António Marques (born 25 October 1963) is a Portuguese boccia player. He has won 8 medals at the Summer Paralympics including 2 gold between 1988 and 2016.
