= Thailand at the Paralympics =

- IOC code: THA
- NOC: Paralympic Committee of Thailand
- Website: www.paralympicthai.com (in Thai and English)
- Medals Ranked 43rd: Gold 30 Silver 40 Bronze 47 Total 117

Summer appearances
- 1984; 1988; 1992; 1996; 2000; 2004; 2008; 2012; 2016; 2020; 2024

Thailand first participated at the Paralympic Games in 1984, and has sent athletes to compete in every Summer Paralympic Games since then. Thailand has never participated in the Winter Paralympic Games.

The Paralympic Committee of Thailand is the country's National Paralympic Committee.

Thailand won its first Paralympic medal at the 1988 Summer Paralympics in Seoul, when Sakul Kumtan won silver in the men's javelin throw A3/A9 event. Thailand's first gold medal came at the 2000 Summer Paralympics in Sydney, when Supachai Koysub won the men's 200 metres T54 in athletics.

As of the 2024 Summer Paralympics, Thai athletes have won 117 Paralympic medals, comprising 30 gold, 40 silver and 47 bronze medals. Thailand's most successful Games to date were the 2024 Paralympics in Paris, where the team won 30 medals: six gold, 11 silver and 13 bronze.

== Medals ==
=== Medals by Summer Games ===
The medal totals by Summer Games are based on the International Paralympic Committee's country profile and historical results archive.

Games	Athletes	Gold	Silver	Bronze	Total	Rank
1960 Rome	did not participate					
1964 Tokyo	did not participate					
1968 Tel Aviv	did not participate					
1972 Heidelberg	did not participate					
1976 Toronto	did not participate					
1980 Arnhem	did not participate					
1984 New York	4	0	0	0	0	−
1988 Seoul	10	0	1	0	1	45
1992 Barcelona	5	0	0	1	1	50
1996 Atlanta	7	0	0	2	2	57
2000 Sydney	41	5	4	2	11	30
2004 Athens	43	3	6	6	15	35
2008 Beijing	40	1	5	7	13	41
2012 London	49	4	2	2	8	31
2016 Rio de Janeiro	45	6	6	6	18	23
2020 Tokyo	76	5	5	8	18	25
2024 Paris	78	6	11	13	30	21
2028 Los Angeles	future event					
2032 Brisbane	future event					
Total		30	40	47	117	43

=== Medals by Winter Games ===
Games	Athletes	Gold	Silver	Bronze	Total	Rank
1976 Örnsköldsvik	did not participate					
1980 Geilo	did not participate					
1984 Innsbruck	did not participate					
1988 Innsbruck	did not participate					
1992 Albertville	did not participate					
1994 Lillehammer	did not participate					
1998 Nagano	did not participate					
2002 Salt Lake City	did not participate					
2006 Turin	did not participate					
2010 Vancouver	did not participate					
2014 Sochi	did not participate					
2018 PyeongChang	did not participate					
2022 Beijing	did not participate					
2026 Milano Cortina	future event					
2030 French Alps	future event					
2034 Salt Lake City	future event					
Total		0	0	0	0	−

=== Medals by Summer Sport ===
Medal totals by sport are calculated from the medalists listed by Summer Games below and the International Paralympic Committee's country medal records.

Leading in that sport

Sport	Gold	Silver	Bronze	Total
Athletics	17	21	16	54
Boccia	6	3	5	14
Wheelchair fencing	5	2	4	11
Table tennis	1	4	9	14
Swimming	1	3	4	8
Powerlifting	0	2	4	6
Badminton	0	2	3	5
Archery	0	2	0	2
Wheelchair tennis	0	1	0	1
Taekwondo	0	0	2	2
Totals (10 entries)	30	40	47	117

=== Medals by Winter Sport ===
Leading in that sport

Sport	Gold	Silver	Bronze	Total
Totals (0 entries)	0	0	0	0

== List of medalists ==
=== Medalists by Summer Games ===
Medal	Name	Games	Sport	Event
Silver	Sakul Kumtan	1988 Seoul	Athletics	Men's javelin throw A3A9
Bronze	Boochit Aungkulanavin	1992 Barcelona	Athletics	Men's javelin throw THS4
Bronze	Prasopchoke Klunngern	1996 Atlanta	Athletics	Men's 10000 m T52-53
Bronze	Panom Lagsanaprim	1996 Atlanta	Swimming	Men's 100 m breaststroke B1
Gold	Supachai Koysub	2000 Sydney	Athletics	Men's 200 m T54
Gold	Prawat Wahoram	2000 Sydney	Athletics	Men's 5000 m T54
Gold	Prawat Wahoram	2000 Sydney	Athletics	Men's 10000 m T54
Gold	Ampai Sualuang; Prasitdhi Thongchuen; Sopa Intasen; Supachai Koysub	2000 Sydney	Athletics	Men's 4 × 100 m relay T54
Gold	Somchai Doungkaew	2000 Sydney	Swimming	Men's 50 m butterfly S4
Silver	Sopa Intasen	2000 Sydney	Athletics	Men's 100 m T53
Silver	Ampai Sualuang; Prasitdhi Thongchuen; Sopa Intasen; Supachai Koysub	2000 Sydney	Athletics	Men's 4 × 400 m relay T54
Silver	Somkhoun Anon	2000 Sydney	Powerlifting	Women's 56 kg
Silver	Somchai Doungkaew	2000 Sydney	Swimming	Men's 150 m individual medley SM3
Bronze	Thongsa Marasri	2000 Sydney	Powerlifting	Men's 48 kg
Bronze	Saifon Kaewsri	2000 Sydney	Swimming	Men's 50 m breaststroke SB2
Gold	Pichet Krungget; Prawat Wahoram; Rawat Tana; Supachai Koysub	2004 Athens	Athletics	Men's 4 × 100 m relay T53–T54
Gold	Pichet Krungget; Prawat Wahoram; Rawat Tana; Supachai Koysub	2004 Athens	Athletics	Men's 4 × 400 m relay T53–T54
Gold	Saysunee Jana	2004 Athens	Wheelchair fencing	Women's épée B
Silver	Wasana Karpmaichan	2004 Athens	Archery	Women's individual standing
Silver	Prawat Wahoram	2004 Athens	Athletics	Men's 10000 m T54
Silver	Thongsa Marasri	2004 Athens	Powerlifting	Men's 48 kg
Silver	Somchai Doungkaew	2004 Athens	Swimming	Men's 50 m breaststroke SB2
Silver	Somchai Doungkaew	2004 Athens	Swimming	Men's 50 m butterfly S4
Silver	Ratana Techamaneewat; Sakhorn Khanthasit	2004 Athens	Wheelchair tennis	Women's doubles
Bronze	Pichet Krungget	2004 Athens	Athletics	Men's 200 m T53
Bronze	Rawat Tana	2004 Athens	Athletics	Men's 10000 m T54
Bronze	Pattaya Tadtong	2004 Athens	Boccia	Mixed individual BC1
Bronze	Panom Lagsanaprim	2004 Athens	Swimming	Men's 100 m breaststroke SB11
Bronze	Sanit Songnork	2004 Athens	Swimming	Men's 150 m individual medley SM4
Bronze	Saysunee Jana	2004 Athens	Wheelchair fencing	Women's foil B
Gold	Prawat Wahoram	2008 Beijing	Athletics	Men's 5000 m T54
Silver	Saichon Konjen	2008 Beijing	Athletics	Men's 100 m T54
Silver	Saichon Konjen	2008 Beijing	Athletics	Men's 200 m T54
Silver	Prawat Wahoram	2008 Beijing	Athletics	Men's 1500 m T54
Silver	Pichet Krungget; Prawat Wahoram; Saichon Konjen; Supachai Koysub	2008 Beijing	Athletics	Men's 4 × 100 m relay T53–T54
Silver	Pichet Krungget; Prawat Wahoram; Saichon Konjen; Supachai Koysub	2008 Beijing	Athletics	Men's 4 × 400 m relay T53–T54
Bronze	Supachai Koysub	2008 Beijing	Athletics	Men's 100 m T54
Bronze	Peth Rungsri	2008 Beijing	Athletics	Men's 200 m T52
Bronze	Saichon Konjen	2008 Beijing	Athletics	Men's 400 m T54
Bronze	Prawat Wahoram	2008 Beijing	Athletics	Men's 800 m T54
Bronze	Narong Kasanun	2008 Beijing	Powerlifting	Men's 52 kg
Bronze	Samkhoun Anon	2008 Beijing	Powerlifting	Women's 52 kg
Bronze	Saysunee Jana	2008 Beijing	Wheelchair fencing	Women's épée B
Gold	Pattaya Tadtong	2012 London	Boccia	Mixed individual BC1
Gold	Mongkol Jitsa-Ngiem; Pattaya Tadtong; Watcharaphon Vongsa; Witsanu Huadpradit	2012 London	Boccia	Mixed team BC1–2
Gold	Rungroj Thainiyom	2012 London	Table tennis	Men's individual – Class 6
Gold	Saysunee Jana	2012 London	Wheelchair fencing	Women's épée B
Silver	Prawat Wahoram	2012 London	Athletics	Men's 1500 m T54
Silver	Prawat Wahoram; Saichon Konjen; Sopa Intasen; Supachai Koysub	2012 London	Athletics	Men's 4 × 400 m relay
Bronze	Saichon Konjen	2012 London	Athletics	Men's 100 m T54
Bronze	Saichon Konjen	2012 London	Athletics	Men's 800 m T54
Gold	Pongsakorn Paeyo	2016 Rio de Janeiro	Athletics	Men's 400 m T53
Gold	Pongsakorn Paeyo	2016 Rio de Janeiro	Athletics	Men's 800 m T53
Gold	Prawat Wahoram	2016 Rio de Janeiro	Athletics	Men's 1500 m T54
Gold	Prawat Wahoram	2016 Rio de Janeiro	Athletics	Men's 5000 m T54
Gold	Watcharaphon Vongsa	2016 Rio de Janeiro	Boccia	Mixed individual BC2
Gold	Pattaya Tadtong; Subin Tipmanee; Watcharaphon Vongsa; Worawut Saengampa	2016 Rio de Janeiro	Boccia	Mixed team BC1–2
Silver	Hanreuchai Netsiri	2016 Rio de Janeiro	Archery	Men's individual recurve open
Silver	Pongsakorn Paeyo	2016 Rio de Janeiro	Athletics	Men's 100 m T53
Silver	Saichon Konjen	2016 Rio de Janeiro	Athletics	Men's 800 m T54
Silver	Prawat Wahoram; Pongsakorn Paeyo; Rawat Tana; Saichon Konjen	2016 Rio de Janeiro	Athletics	Men's 4 × 400 m relay
Silver	Worawut Saengampa	2016 Rio de Janeiro	Boccia	Mixed individual BC2
Silver	Saysunee Jana	2016 Rio de Janeiro	Wheelchair fencing	Women's épée B
Bronze	Pichaya Kunrattanasiri	2016 Rio de Janeiro	Athletics	Men's 1500 m T52
Bronze	Saichon Konjen	2016 Rio de Janeiro	Athletics	Men's 1500 m T54
Bronze	Pornchok Larpyen	2016 Rio de Janeiro	Boccia	Mixed individual BC4
Bronze	Chaloemphon Tanbut; Nuanchan Phonsila; Pornchok Larpyen	2016 Rio de Janeiro	Boccia	Mixed pairs BC4
Bronze	Rungroj Thainiyom	2016 Rio de Janeiro	Table tennis	Men's individual – Class 6
Bronze	Anurak Laowong; Yuttajak Glinbancheun	2016 Rio de Janeiro	Table tennis	Men's team – Class 3
Gold	Athiwat Paeng-nuea	2020 Tokyo	Athletics	Men's 100 m T54
Gold	Pongsakorn Paeyo	2020 Tokyo	Athletics	Men's 100 m T53
Gold	Pongsakorn Paeyo	2020 Tokyo	Athletics	Men's 400 m T53
Gold	Pongsakorn Paeyo	2020 Tokyo	Athletics	Men's 800 m T53
Gold	Witsanu Huadpradit; Subin Tipmanee; Watcharaphon Vongsa; Worawut Saengampa	2020 Tokyo	Boccia	Mixed team BC1–2
Silver	Athiwat Paeng-Nuea	2020 Tokyo	Athletics	Men's 400 m T54
Silver	Prawat Wahoram	2020 Tokyo	Athletics	Men's 1500 m T54
Silver	Sujirat Pookkham	2020 Tokyo	Badminton	Women's singles WH1
Silver	Pornchok Larpyen	2020 Tokyo	Boccia	Mixed individual BC2
Silver	Watcharaphon Vongsa	2020 Tokyo	Boccia	Mixed individual BC4
Bronze	Saichon Konjen	2020 Tokyo	Athletics	Men's 800 m T54
Bronze	Putharet Khongrak	2020 Tokyo	Athletics	Men's 1500 m T54
Bronze	Putharet Khongrak	2020 Tokyo	Athletics	Men's 5000 m T54
Bronze	Sujirat Pookkham; Amnouy Wetwithan	2020 Tokyo	Badminton	Women's doubles WH1–WH2
Bronze	Rungroj Thainiyom	2020 Tokyo	Table tennis	Men's individual – Class 6
Bronze	Anurak Laowong; Yuttajak Glinbancheun; Thirayu Chueawong	2020 Tokyo	Table tennis	Men's team – Class 3
Bronze	Khwansuda Phuangkitcha	2020 Tokyo	Taekwondo	Women's 49 kg
Bronze	Saysunee Jana	2020 Tokyo	Wheelchair fencing	Women's épée B
Gold	Pongsakorn Paeyo	2024 Paris	Athletics	Men's 400 metres T53
Gold	Worawut Saengampa	2024 Paris	Boccia	Men's individual BC2
Gold	Chaiwat Rattana	2024 Paris	Athletics	Men's 100 m T34
Gold	Saysunee Jana	2024 Paris	Wheelchair fencing	Women's sabre B
Gold	Saysunee Jana	2024 Paris	Wheelchair fencing	Women's foil B
Gold	Saysunee Jana	2024 Paris	Wheelchair fencing	Women's épée B
Silver	Yuttajak Glinbancheun; Wijittra Jaion	2024 Paris	Table tennis	Mixed doubles XD7
Silver	Rungroj Thainiyom; Phisit Wangphonphathanasiri	2024 Paris	Table tennis	Men's doubles MD14
Silver	Athiwat Paeng-nuea	2024 Paris	Athletics	Men's 400 metres T54
Silver	Sujirat Pookkham	2024 Paris	Badminton	Singles WH1
Silver	Pongsakorn Paeyo	2024 Paris	Athletics	Men's 100 metres T53
Silver	Athiwat Paeng-nuea	2024 Paris	Athletics	Men's 100 metres T54
Silver	Pongsakorn Paeyo	2024 Paris	Athletics	Men's 800 metres T53
Silver	Rungroj Thainiyom	2024 Paris	Table tennis	Men's individual C6
Silver	Visit Kingmanaw	2024 Paris	Wheelchair fencing	Men's épée B
Silver	Chaiwat Rattana	2024 Paris	Athletics	Men's 800 m T34
Silver	Wanchai Chaiwut	2024 Paris	Table tennis	Men's individual C4
Bronze	Khwansuda Phuangkitcha	2024 Paris	Taekwondo	Women's –47 kg
Bronze	Dararat Asayut; Chilchitparyak Bootwansirina	2024 Paris	Table tennis	Women's doubles WD5
Bronze	Wanchai Chaiwut; Yuttajak Glinbancheun	2024 Paris	Table tennis	Men's doubles MD8
Bronze	Watcharaphon Vongsa	2024 Paris	Boccia	Men's individual BC2
Bronze	Sujirat Pookkham; Amnouy Wetwithan	2024 Paris	Badminton	Women's doubles WH1–WH2
Bronze	Mongkhon Bunsun	2024 Paris	Badminton	Men's singles SL3
Bronze	Yuttajak Glinbancheun	2024 Paris	Table tennis	Men's individual C3
Bronze	Pornchok Larpyen; Nuanchan Phonsila	2024 Paris	Boccia	Mixed pairs BC4
Bronze	Kamolpan Kraratpet	2024 Paris	Powerlifting	Women's 55 kg
Bronze	Phisit Wangphonphathanasiri	2024 Paris	Table tennis	Men's individual C8
Bronze	Chalermpong Punpoo	2024 Paris	Table tennis	Men's individual C7
Bronze	Saysunee Jana; Aphinya Thongdaeng; Duean Nakprasit	2024 Paris	Wheelchair fencing	Women's épée team
Bronze	Sasirawan Inthachot	2024 Paris	Athletics	Women's 200 m T47

=== Medals by individual ===
The following is a list of athletes who have won two or more Paralympic medals for Thailand, compiled from the International Paralympic Committee's athlete profiles, country profile and historical results archive.

Athlete	Sport	Years	Games	Gender	1st place, gold medalist(s)	2nd place, silver medalist(s)	3rd place, bronze medalist(s)	Total
Prawat Wahoram	Athletics	2000–2020	Summer	Men	7	8	1	16
**Pongsakorn Paeyo**	Athletics	2016–2024	Summer	Men	6	4	0	10
**Saysunee Jana**	Wheelchair fencing	2004–2024	Summer	Women	5	1	4	10
Supachai Koysub	Athletics	2000–2012	Summer	Men	4	4	1	9
**Watcharaphon Vongsa**	Boccia	2012–2024	Summer	Men	4	1	1	6
**Worawut Saengampa**	Boccia	2016–2024	Summer	Men	3	1	0	4
Pattaya Tadtong	Boccia	2004–2016	Summer	Men	3	0	1	4
**Pichet Krungget**	Athletics	2004–2024	Summer	Men	2	2	1	5
Rawat Tana	Athletics	2004, 2016	Summer	Men	2	1	1	4
**Witsanu Huadpradit**	Boccia	2012, 2020–2024	Summer	Men	2	0	0	2
Subin Tipmanee	Boccia	2016–2020	Summer	Women	2	0	0	2
Somchai Doungkaew	Swimming	2000–2016	Summer	Men	1	3	0	4
Sopa Intasen	Athletics	2000–2012	Summer	Men	1	3	0	4
**Athiwat Paeng-nuea**	Athletics	2020–2024	Summer	Men	1	3	0	4
**Rungroj Thainiyom**	Table tennis	2008–2024	Summer	Men	1	2	2	5
Ampai Sualuang	Athletics	1996–2008	Summer	Men	1	1	0	2
Prasitdhi Thongchuen	Athletics	2000	Summer	Men	1	1	0	2
**Chaiwat Rattana**	Athletics	2020–2024	Summer	Men	1	1	0	2
Saichon Konjen	Athletics	2008–2024	Summer	Men	0	7	5	12
**Sujirat Pookkham**	Badminton	2020–2024	Summer	Women	0	2	2	4
**Yuttajak Glinbancheun**	Table tennis	2016–2024	Summer	Men	0	1	4	5
**Pornchok Larpyen**	Boccia	2012–2024	Summer	Men	0	1	3	4
Somkhoun Anon	Powerlifting	2000–2008, 2020	Summer	Women	0	1	1	2
Thongsa Marasri	Powerlifting	2000–2012, 2020	Summer	Men	0	1	1	2
**Phisit Wangphonphathanasiri**	Table tennis	2020–2024	Summer	Men	0	1	1	2
**Wanchai Chaiwut**	Table tennis	2008, 2016–2024	Summer	Men	0	1	1	2
Panom Lagsanaprim	Swimming	1992–2016	Summer	Men	0	0	2	2
Anurak Laowong	Table tennis	2016–2020	Summer	Men	0	0	2	2
**Putharet Khongrak**	Athletics	2020–2024	Summer	Men	0	0	2	2
**Nuanchan Phonsila**	Boccia	2016–2024	Summer	Women	0	0	2	2
**Khwansuda Phuangkitcha**	Taekwondo	2020–2024	Summer	Women	0	0	2	2
**Amnouy Wetwithan**	Badminton	2020–2024	Summer	Women	0	0	2	2

- **People in bold** are still active competitors.

== Flag bearers ==
=== Flag bearers by Summer Games ===
Games	Flag bearer	Sport
1960 Rome	did not participate	
1964 Tokyo	did not participate	
1968 Tel Aviv	did not participate	
1972 Heidelberg	did not participate	
1976 Toronto	did not participate	
1980 Arnhem	did not participate	
1984 New York		
1988 Seoul		
1992 Barcelona		
1996 Atlanta		
2000 Sydney		
2004 Athens	Prawat Wahoram	Athletics
2008 Beijing	Supachai Koysub	Athletics
2012 London	Saysunee Jana	Wheelchair fencing
2016 Rio de Janeiro	Rawat Tana	Athletics
2020 Tokyo	Pongsakorn Paeyo; Subin Tipmanee	Athletics; Boccia
2024 Paris	Athiwat Paeng-nuea; Saysunee Jana	Athletics; Wheelchair fencing

=== Flag bearers by Winter Games ===
Games	Flag bearer	Sport
1976 Örnsköldsvik	did not participate	
1980 Geilo	did not participate	
1984 Innsbruck	did not participate	
1988 Innsbruck	did not participate	
1992 Albertville	did not participate	
1994 Lillehammer	did not participate	
1998 Nagano	did not participate	
2002 Salt Lake City	did not participate	
2006 Turin	did not participate	
2010 Vancouver	did not participate	
2014 Sochi	did not participate	
2018 PyeongChang	did not participate	
2022 Beijing	did not participate	

== See also ==
- Olympics
  - Thailand at the Olympics
  - Thailand at the Youth Olympics
- Asian Games
  - Thailand at the Asian Games
  - Thailand at the Asian Para Games
- Other
  - Thailand at the Universiade
  - Thailand at the World Games
