= Thailand at the 2012 Summer Paralympics =

- IPC code: THA
- NPC: Paralympic Committee of Thailand
- Website: www.paralympicthai.com (in Thai and English)

in London
- Competitors: 50 in 10 sports
- Medals Ranked 31st: Gold 4 Silver 2 Bronze 2 Total 8

Summer Paralympics appearances (overview)
- 1984; 1988; 1992; 1996; 2000; 2004; 2008; 2012; 2016; 2020; 2024

Thailand competed at the 2012 Summer Paralympics in London, United Kingdom from 29 August to 9 September 2012. Thailand won eight medals, comprising four gold, two silver and two bronze, and finished 31st in the medal table.

== Medalists ==
| Medal | Name | Sport | Event |
|---|---|---|---|
| Gold | Pattaya Tadtong | Boccia | Mixed individual BC1 |
| Gold | Rungroj Thainiyom | Table tennis | Men's individual – Class 6 |
| Gold | Saysunee Jana | Wheelchair fencing | Women's épée B |
| Gold | Witsanu Huadpradit; Mongkol Jitsa-Ngiem; Pattaya Tadtong; Watcharaphon Vongsa | Boccia | Mixed team BC1-2 |
| Silver | Prawat Wahoram | Athletics | Men's 1500 m T54 |
| Silver | Prawat Wahoram; Saichon Konjen; Sopa Intasen; Supachai Koysub | Athletics | Men's 4 × 400 m relay T53–T54 |
| Bronze | Saichon Konjen | Athletics | Men's 100 m T54 |
| Bronze | Saichon Konjen | Athletics | Men's 800 m T54 |

== Archery ==
| Athlete | Event | Ranking round | | Round of 32 | Round of 16 | Quarterfinals | Semifinals | Finals | |
| Athlete | Event | Score | Seed | Opposition score | Opposition score | Opposition score | Opposition score | Opposition score | Rank |
|---|---|---|---|---|---|---|---|---|---|
| Sakon Inkaew | Men's ind. recurve standing | 602 | 12 | Lyocsa (SVK) (21); W 6-0 | Oyun (RUS) (5); L 1-7 | did not advance | | | |
| Wasana Khuthawisap | Women's ind. recurve standing | 522 | 9 | Bye | Byambasuren (MGL) (8); L 4-6 | did not advance | | | |

== Athletics ==
Key

- Note – Ranks given for track events are within the athlete's heat only
- Q = Qualified for the next round
- q = Qualified for the next round as a fastest loser
- WR = World record
- PR = Paralympic record
- AS = Asian record
- NR = National record
- N/A = Round not applicable for the event
- Bye = Athlete not required to compete in round

=== Men's track ===
==== T11-13 ====
| Athlete | Guide | Events | Heat | | Semifinal | | Final | |
| Athlete | Guide | Events | Time | Rank | Time | Rank | Time | Rank |
|---|---|---|---|---|---|---|---|---|
| Kitsana Jorchuy | Patchai Srikhamphan | 100 m T11 | 11.78 | 2 q | 11.75 | 3 | did not advance | |
| Kitsana Jorchuy | Patchai Srikhamphan | 200 m T11 | 24.31 | 3 | did not advance | | | |
| Suphachai Songphinit | - | 400 m T12 | 53.03 | 4 | did not advance | | | |
| Songwut Lamsan | - | 100 m T13 | 11.59 | 6 | —N/a | | did not advance | |
| Songwut Lamsan | - | 200 m T13 | 23.73 | 6 | —N/a | | did not advance | |
| Somdech Chaiya; Kitsana Jorchuy; Songwut Lamsan; Suphachai Songphinit | - Patchai Srikhamphan - - | 4 × 100 m relay T11-T13 | 44.76 | 2 | —N/a | | did not advance | |

==== T51-58 ====
| Athlete | Events | Heat | | Final | |
| Athlete | Events | Time | Rank | Time | Rank |
|---|---|---|---|---|---|
| Peth Rungsri | 100 m T52 | 18.53 | 3 Q | 19.05 | 8 |
| Peth Rungsri | 200 m T52 | 32.96 | 4 q | 33.60 | 7 |
| Peth Rungsri | 400 m T52 | 1:06.74 | 5 q | 1:06.46 | 5 |
| Sopa Intasen | 100 m T53 | 16.23 | 5 | did not advance | |
| Pichet Krungget | 100 m T53 | 16.49 | 6 | did not advance | |
| Sopa Intasen | 200 m T53 | 27.97 | 7 | did not advance | |
| Pichet Krungget | 200 m T53 | 29.11 | 7 | did not advance | |
| Sopa Intasen | 400 m T53 | DQ | | did not advance | |
| Pichet Krungget | 400 m T53 | 53.63 | 6 | did not advance | |
| Saichon Konjen | 100 m T54 | 14.16 | 2 Q | 14.10 | 3rd place, bronze medalist(s) |
| Supachai Koysub | 100 m T54 | 14.43 | 2 Q | 14.74 | 7 |
| Sukhum Namlun | 100 m T54 | 14.49 | 3 | did not advance | |
| Saichon Konjen | 400 m T54 | 47.87 | 1 Q | DQ | |
| Supachai Koysub | 400 m T54 | 50.66 | 3 | did not advance | |
| Saichon Konjen | 800 m T54 | 1:37.96 | 1 Q | 1:38.51 | 3rd place, bronze medalist(s) |
| Saichon Konjen | 1500 m T54 | 3:14.81 | 1 Q | 3:12.84 | 5 |
| Prawat Wahoram | 1500 m T54 | 3:11.31 | 2 Q | 3:12.32 | 2nd place, silver medalist(s) |
| Prawat Wahoram | 5000 m T54 | 10:56.74 | 3 Q | 11:08.55 | 5 |
| Sopa Intasen; Saichon Konjen; Supachai Koysub; Prawat Wahoram | 4 × 400 m relay T53-T54 | 3:14.29 | 1 q | 3:13.28 | 2nd place, silver medalist(s) |

=== Men's field ===
| Athlete | Events | Mark (m) | Points | Rank |
|---|---|---|---|---|
| Jakkit Punthong | Long jump F11 | 5.47 | —N/a | 9 |
| Angcan Chanaboon | High jump F46 | 1.95 | —N/a | 5 |
| Sakchai Yimbanchang | Javelin F57/58 | 46.15 | 957 | 5 |

=== Women's field ===
| Athlete | Events | Mark (m) | Rank |
|---|---|---|---|
| Surang Khamsuk | Javelin F46 | 29.09 | 9 |

== Boccia ==
Individual

| Athlete | Event | Seeding matches | Round of 32 | Round of 16 | Quarterfinals | Semifinals | Finals | |
| Athlete | Event | Opposition Score | Opposition Score | Opposition Score | Opposition Score | Opposition Score | Opposition Score | Rank |
|---|---|---|---|---|---|---|---|---|
| Witsanu Huadpradit | Mixed individual BC1 | Bye | | Prado Prado (ESP); W 5-4 | Tadtong (THA); L 0-7 | Semi-finals 5-8; Zhang (CHN); L 3-6 | Playoff 7-8; Kim (KOR); W 11-0 | 7 |
| Pattaya Tadtong | Mixed individual BC1 | Bye | | Yuan (CHN); W 5-1 | Huadpradit (THA); W 7-0 | Chagas (BRA); W 5-2 | Smith (GBR); W 7-0 | 1st place, gold medalist(s) |
| Mongkol Jitsa-Ngiem | Mixed individual BC2 | Bye | Sohn (KOR); L 4-5 | did not advance | | | | |
| Watcharaphon Vongsa | Mixed individual BC2 | Bye | Sugimura (JPN); W 5-5 | Sohn (KOR); L 2-7 | did not advance | | | |
| Tanimpat Visaratanunta | Mixed individual BC3 | Bye | Martins (BRA); L 2-7 | did not advance | | | | |
| Sataporn Yoojaroen | Mixed individual BC4 | Bye | —N/a | Lau (HKG); L 1-4 | did not advance | | | |

Pairs and Teams

| Athlete | Event | Pool matches | | | | Quarterfinals | Semifinals | Final | |
| Athlete | Event | Opposition Score | Opposition Score | Opposition Score | Rank | Opposition Score | Opposition Score | Opposition Score | Rank |
|---|---|---|---|---|---|---|---|---|---|
| Witsanu Huadpradit; Mongkol Jitsa-Ngiem; Pattaya Tadtong; Watcharaphon Vongsa | Mixed team BC1-2 | Canada (CAN); W 22-0 | China (CHN); W 8-3 | —N/a | 1 Q | Hong Kong (HKG); W 11-1 | Great Britain (GBR); W 18-1 | China (CHN); W 10-5 | 1st place, gold medalist(s) |
| Somboon Chaipanich; Tanimpat Visaratanunta | Mixed pairs BC3 | Belgium (BEL); L 1-7 | Portugal (POR); L 1-5 | Spain (ESP); W 9-0 | 3 | —N/a | did not advance | | |
| Pornchok Larpyen; Sataporn Yoojaroen | Mixed pairs BC4 | Canada (CAN); L 1-6 | Slovakia (SVK); W 10-0 | Great Britain (GBR); L 0-8 | 3 | —N/a | did not advance | | |

== Powerlifting ==
| Athlete | Event | Total lifted | Rank |
|---|---|---|---|
| Arawan Bootpo | Women's -67.5 kg | 111 kg | 5 |
| Narong Kasanun | Men's -56 kg | 162 kg | 7 |
| Thongsa Marasri | Men's -60 kg | 175 kg | 5 |
| Choochat Sukjarern | Men's -52 kg | 152 kg | 7 |

== Shooting ==
| Athlete | Event | Qualification | | Final | |
| Athlete | Event | Score | Rank | Score | Rank |
|---|---|---|---|---|---|
| Phiraphong Buengbok | Men's 10m Air Rifle Standing SH1 | 580 | 16 | did not advance | |
| Phiraphong Buengbok | Men's 50m Rifle 3 Positions SH1 | 1099 | 23 | did not advance | |
| Phiraphong Buengbok | Mixed 10m Air Rifle Prone SH1 | 592 | 38 | did not advance | |
| Phiraphong Buengbok | Mixed 50m Rifle Prone SH1 | 580 | 27 | did not advance | |
| Wasana Keatjaratkul | Women's 10m Air Rifle Standing SH1 | 393 | 2 Q | 492.3 | 5 |
| Wasana Keatjaratkul | Women's 50m Rifle 3 Positions SH1 | 555 | 9 | did not advance | |
| Mala Sihabandit | Mixed 10m Air Rifle Prone SH1 | 599 | 12 | did not advance | |
| Mala Sihabandit | Mixed 50m Rifle Prone SH1 | 575 | 37 | did not advance | |
| Bordin Sornsriwichai | Men's 10m Air Pistol SH1 | 566 | 4 Q | 662.1 | 4 |

== Swimming ==
Men

| Athlete | Events | Heats | | Final | |
| Athlete | Events | Time | Rank | Time | Rank |
|---|---|---|---|---|---|
| Charkorn Kaewsri | 50 m breaststroke SB2 | 1:08.49 | 11 | did not advance | |
| Somchai Doungkaew | 50 m breaststroke SB2 | 1:02.72 | 7 Q | 1:01.84 | 6 |
| Somchai Doungkaew | 150 m individual medley SM3 | 3:08.10 | 4 Q | 3:07.62 | 5 |
| Voravit Kaewkham | 50 m butterfly S5 | 45.04 | 12 | did not advance | |
| Taweesook Samuksaneeto | 100 m breaststroke SB5 | 1:55.80 | 10 | did not advance | |
| Rattaporn Jearchan | 100 m butterfly S11 | 1:29.02 | 12 | did not advance | |
| Rattaporn Jearchan | 100 m backstroke S11 | 1:21.73 | 13 | did not advance | |
| Panom Lagsanaprim | 100 m breaststroke SB11 | 1:21.40 | 6 Q | 1:20.25 | 7 |
| Panom Lagsanaprim | 200 m individual medley SM11 | DSQ | | did not advance | |

== Wheelchair fencing ==
Women

| Athlete | Event | Qualification | | | Quarterfinal | Semifinal | Finals | |
| Athlete | Event | Opposition Score | Opposition Score | Rank | Opposition Score | Opposition Score | Opposition Score | Rank |
|---|---|---|---|---|---|---|---|---|
| Saysunee Jana | Individual épée B | Vasileva (RUS); W 5-3 | Makrytskaya (BLR); W 5-3 | 2 Q | Makowska (POL) (7); W 15-5 | Chan (HKG) (3); W 15-14 | Briese-Baetke (GER) (1); W 15-8 | 1st place, gold medalist(s) |
| Saysunee Jana | Individual épée B | Dani (HUN); W 5-2 | Moore (GBR); W 5-0 | 2 Q | Makowska (POL) (7); W 15-5 | Chan (HKG) (3); W 15-14 | Briese-Baetke (GER) (1); W 15-8 | 1st place, gold medalist(s) |
| Saysunee Jana | Individual épée B | Briese-Baetke (GER); L 4-5 | | 2 Q | Makowska (POL) (7); W 15-5 | Chan (HKG) (3); W 15-14 | Briese-Baetke (GER) (1); W 15-8 | 1st place, gold medalist(s) |

Note: Ranks from qualification pools were given as an overall ranking against all other competitors.

== Wheelchair tennis ==
| Athlete (seed) | Event | Round of 64 | Round of 32 | Round of 16 | Quarterfinals | Semifinals | Finals | |
| Athlete (seed) | Event | Opposition Score | Opposition Score | Opposition Score | Opposition Score | Opposition Score | Opposition Score | Rank |
|---|---|---|---|---|---|---|---|---|
| Suthi Khlongrua | Men's singles | Houdet (FRA); L 1-6 0-6 | did not advance | | | | | |
| Suwitchai Merngprom | Men's singles | Vink (NED); L 1-6 2-6 | did not advance | | | | | |
| Sakhorn Khanthasit | Women's singles | —N/a | Whiley (GBR); W 6-3 6-4 | Di Toro (AUS); W 1-6 6-0 6-3 | Vergeer (NED); L 1-6 0-6 | did not advance | | |
| Ratana Techamaneewat | Women's singles | —N/a | Buis (NED); L 2-6 1-6 | did not advance | | | | |
| Suthi Khlongrua; Suwitchai Merngprom | Men's doubles | —N/a | Jaroszewski, Kruszelnicki (POL); W 7-6 2-6 6-2 | Miki, Sanada (JPN); L 5-7 5-7 | did not advance | | | |
| Sakhorn Khanthasit; Ratana Techamaneewat | Women's doubles | —N/a | | Di Toro, Manns (AUS); W 6-4 6-0 | Domori, Kamiji (JPN); W 7-6 7-6 | Buis, Vergeer (NED); L 0-6 1-6 | Bronze Medal Match; Shuker, Whiley (GBR); L 7-6 6-7 3-6 | 4 |

== See also ==
- Thailand at the 2012 Summer Olympics
