= Athletics at the 2004 Summer Paralympics – Men's 100 metres T52–54 =

Men's 100m races for wheelchair athletes at the 2004 Summer Paralympics were held in the Athens Olympic Stadium. Events were held in three disability classes.

== T52 ==
Men's 100m T52 at the XII Paralympic Games
- Venue: Athens Olympic Stadium
- Dates: 24 September 2004
- Competitors: 9 from 6 nations
- Winning time: 17.21

Medalists
1st place, gold medalist(s)		Salvador Hernández	Mexico
2nd place, silver medalist(s)		Beat Boesch	Switzerland
3rd place, bronze medalist(s)		Andre Beaudoin	Canada

The T52 event consisted of a single race. It was won by Salvador Hernández, representing Mexico.

=== Final Round ===
24 Sept. 2004, 19:25

Rank	Athlete	Time	Notes
1st place, gold medalist(s)	Salvador Hernández (MEX)	17.21	
2nd place, silver medalist(s)	Beat Boesch (SUI)	17.69	
3rd place, bronze medalist(s)	Andre Beaudoin (CAN)	17.70	
4	Ian Rice (USA)	18.11	
5	Joseph Radmore (CAN)	18.17	
6	Paul Nitz (USA)	18.45	
7	Yasunari Yaezawa (JPN)	18.65	
8	Peth Rungsri (THA)	19.65	
9	Santiago Velazquez (MEX)	22.08	

== T53 ==
Men's 100m T53 at the XII Paralympic Games
- Venue: Athens Olympic Stadium
- Dates: 24–25 September 2004
- Competitors: 19 from 12 nations
- Winning time: 15.04

Medalists
1st place, gold medalist(s)		Hong Suk Man	South Korea
2nd place, silver medalist(s)		Hamad Aladwani	Kuwait
3rd place, bronze medalist(s)		Joshua George	United States

The T53 event consisted of 3 heats and a final. It was won by Hong Suk Man, representing South Korea.

=== 1st Round ===
Qualified for next round

Heat 1

24 Sept. 2004, 10:10

Rank	Athlete	Time	Notes
1	Hong Suk Man (KOR)	15.11	PR Q
2	Hamad Aladwani (KUW)	15.38	Q
3	Sopa Intasen (THA)	15.43	q
4	Jaime Ramirez (MEX)	15.95	
5	Eric Gauthier (CAN)	16.01	
6	Bojan Mitic (SUI)	16.08	
7	John Lindsay (AUS)	16.12	

Heat 2

24 Sept. 2004, 10:16

Rank	Athlete	Time	Notes
1	Pichet Krungget (THA)	15.16	Q
2	Joshua George (USA)	15.36	Q
3	Ayed Alhababi (UAE)	15.91	q
4	Richard Colman (AUS)	15.92	
5	Jason Lachance (CAN)	16.12	
6	Edison Kasumaj (SUI)	16.87	

Heat 3

24 Sept. 2004, 10:22

Rank	Athlete	Time	Notes
1	Christopher Waddell (USA)	15.66	Q
2	John Fulham (IRL)	15.80	Q
3	Hong Duk Ho (KOR)	15.95	
4	Jacques Bouchard (CAN)	16.61	
5	Sergey Shilov (RUS)	16.67	
6	Susumu Kangawa (JPN)	16.83	

=== Final Round ===
25 Sept. 2004, 21:10

Rank	Athlete	Time	Notes
1st place, gold medalist(s)	Hong Suk Man (KOR)	15.04	PR
2nd place, silver medalist(s)	Hamad Aladwani (KUW)	15.06	
3rd place, bronze medalist(s)	Joshua George (USA)	15.30	
4	Pichet Krungget (THA)	15.35	
5	Sopa Intasen (THA)	15.36	
6	John Fulham (IRL)	15.67	
7	Christopher Waddell (USA)	15.74	
8	Ayed Alhababi (UAE)	16.11	

== T54 ==
Men's 100m T54 at the XII Paralympic Games
- Venue: Athens Olympic Stadium
- Dates: 25–26 September 2004
- Competitors: 30 from 20 nations
- Winning time: 14.19

Medalists
1st place, gold medalist(s)		Leo Pekka Tahti	Finland
2nd place, silver medalist(s)		David Weir	Great Britain
3rd place, bronze medalist(s)		Kenny van Weeghel	Netherlands

The T54 event consisted of 4 heats, 2 semifinals and a final. It was won by Leo Pekka Tahti, representing Finland.

=== 1st Round ===
Qualified for next round

Heat 1

25 Sept. 2004, 10:55

Rank	Athlete	Time	Notes
1	Supachai Koysub (THA)	14.32	Q
2	Gonzalo Valdovinos (MEX)	14.88	q
3	Zhang Li Xin (CHN)	14.94	q
4	Richard Nicholson (AUS)	15.05	q
5	Nkegbe Botsyo (GHA)	15.47	
6	Omer Cantay (TUR)	16.44	
7	William Rivas (ESA)	17.22	

Heat 2

25 Sept. 2004, 11:01

Rank	Athlete	Time	Notes
1	Kenny van Weeghel (NED)	14.27	Q
2	Yoshifumi Nagao (JPN)	14.96	q
3	Li Jun (CHN)	15.12	q
4	Hubert Locco (FRA)	15.33	
5	Freddy Sandoval (MEX)	15.55	
6	Ampai Sualuang (THA)	16.02	
7	Vicente Arzo (ESP)	16.48	

Heat 3

25 Sept. 2004, 11:07

Rank	Athlete	Time	Notes
1	Leo Pekka Tahti (FIN)	14.03	Q
2	David Holding (GBR)	14.22	q
3	Claude Issorat (FRA)	14.77	q
4	Daniel Normandin (CAN)	15.09	q
5	Prasit Thongchuen (THA)	15.13	
6	Alejandro Maldonado (ARG)	15.16	
7	Cheng Yan Keung (HKG)	15.25	
8	Wilson de la Cruz (ECU)	16.91	

Heat 4

25 Sept. 2004, 11:13

Rank	Athlete	Time	Notes
1	David Weir (GBR)	14.17	PR Q
2	Geoff Trappett (AUS)	14.87	q
3	Sebastian Cleem (GER)	14.98	q
4	Fernando Sanchez (MEX)	15.01	q
5	Liu Wei (CHN)	15.09	q
6	Jasim Al Naqbi (UAE)	15.18	
7	Brent Lakatos (CAN)	15.33	
8	Mario Madriz (NCA)	19.74	

=== Semifinals ===
Heat 1

25 Sept. 2004, 17:00

Rank	Athlete	Time	Notes
1	Leo Pekka Tahti (FIN)	14.30	Q
2	David Holding (GBR)	14.52	Q
3	Supachai Koysub (THA)	14.65	Q
4	Yoshifumi Nagao (JPN)	14.87	Q
5	Claude Issorat (FRA)	14.87	
6	Li Jun (CHN)	14.91	
7	Fernando Sanchez (MEX)	15.13	
8	Liu Wei (CHN)	15.16	

Heat 2

25 Sept. 2004, 17:06

Rank	Athlete	Time	Notes
1	Kenny van Weeghel (NED)	14.30	Q
2	David Weir (GBR)	14.31	Q
3	Geoff Trappett (AUS)	14.91	Q
4	Gonzalo Valdovinos (MEX)	14.97	Q
5	Sebastian Cleem (GER)	15.05	
6	Zhang Li Xin (CHN)	15.16	
7	Richard Nicholson (AUS)	15.33	
8	Daniel Normandin (CAN)	15.47	

=== Final Round ===
26 Sept. 2004, 20:50

Rank	Athlete	Time	Notes
1st place, gold medalist(s)	Leo Pekka Tahti (FIN)	14.19	
2nd place, silver medalist(s)	David Weir (GBR)	14.31	
3rd place, bronze medalist(s)	Kenny van Weeghel (NED)	14.33	
4	David Holding (GBR)	14.58	
5	Gonzalo Valdovinos (MEX)	14.80	
6	Geoff Trappett (AUS)	15.00	
7	Yoshifumi Nagao (JPN)	15.06	
	Supachai Koysub (THA)	DSQ	
