= Boccia at the 2016 Summer Paralympics – Individual BC1 =

Boccia – Individual BC1 at the XV Paralympic Games
- Venue: Sambodromo
- Dates: 13 September 2016 – 6 September 2016
- Competitors: 16

Medalists
1st place, gold medalist(s)		David Smith	Great Britain
2nd place, silver medalist(s)		Daniel Perez	Netherlands
3rd place, bronze medalist(s)		Yoo Won-jeong	South Korea

The mixed individual BC1 boccia event at the 2016 Summer Paralympics was contested from 13 September to 16 September at Sambodromo in Rio de Janeiro. 16 competitors took part.

The event structure was amended from the 2012 event, with pool stages added. The top two players from each of four pools then entered into a quarter final single elimination stage, with the losing semifinalists playing off for bronze.

2012 silver medalist, Great Britain's David Smith, won the gold medal, his second ever and first in an individual event, over the Netherlands' Daniel Perez, with Korea's Yoo Won-jeong beating Antonio Marques of Portugal for the bronze medal.

== Final Stages ==
Quarter finals
1	Pattaya Tadtong (THA)	4
8	David Smith (GBR)	4*
4	Leung Mei Yee (HKG)	0
5	Yoo Won-jeong (KOR)	10
2	Antonio Marques (POR)	4
7	Jose Carlos Chagas (BRA)	3
3	Daniel Perez (NED)	13
6	Panagiotis Soulanis (GRE)	0

Semi finals
David Smith (GBR)	5
Yoo Won-jeong (KOR)	3
Antonio Marques (POR)	1
Daniel Perez (NED)	8

Gold medal match
David Smith (GBR)	5 (gold)
Daniel Perez (NED)	0 (silver)
Bronze medal match
Yoo Won-jeong (KOR)	8 (bronze)
Antonio Marques (POR)	1

== Pool stages ==
=== Pool A ===
Boccia at the 2016 Summer Paralympics - Individual BC1 Pool A
Pos	Player	Pld	W	D	L	PF	PA	PD	Pts	H2H	Player	(Thailand)	(Brazil)	(China)	(Japan)
1 Q	P. Tadtong (THA)	3	3	0	0	32	3	+29	9	H2H	(Thailand)		8-1	6-2	18-0
2 Q	J.C. Chagas (BRA)	3	2	0	1	9	11	-2	7	H2H	(Brazil)	1-8		3-2	5-1
3	Sun Kai (CHN)	3	0	1	2	8	13	−5	4	H2H	(China)	2-6	2-3		4-4
4	Yuriko Fujii (JPN)	3	0	1	2	5	27	−22	4	H2H	(Japan)	0-18	1-5	4-4	

=== Pool B ===
Boccia at the 2016 Summer Paralympics – Individual BC1 Pool B
Pos	Player	Pld	W	D	L	PF	PA	PD	Pts	H2H	Player	(Portugal)	(United Kingdom)	(China)	(Slovakia)
1 Q	A. Marques (POR)	3	2	0	1	14	9	+5	7	H2H	(Portugal)		9-3	3-2	2-4
2 Q	David Smith (GBR)	3	2	0	1	20	11	+9	7	H2H	(United Kingdom)	3-9		4-2	13-0
3	Zhang Qi (CHN)	3	1	0	2	9	10	−1	5	H2H	(China)	2-3	2-4		5-3
4	Jakub Nagi (SVK)	3	1	0	2	7	20	−13	5	H2H	(Slovakia)	0-13	4-2	3-5	

=== Pool C ===
Boccia at the 2016 Summer Paralympics - Individual BC1 Pool C
Pos	Player	Pld	W	D	L	PF	PA	PD	Pts	H2H	Player	(Netherlands)	(South Korea)	(Czech Republic)	(Norway)
1 Q	Daniel Perez (NED)	3	3	0	0	25	5	+20	9	H2H	(Netherlands)		5-4	9-1	11-0
2 Q	Yoo W.J. (KOR)	3	2	0	1	20	7	+13	7	H2H	(South Korea)	4-5		9-0	7-2
3	Ka. Curinova (CZE)	3	1	0	2	4	20	−16	5	H2H	(Czech Republic)	1-9	0-9		3-2
4	Roger Aandalen (NOR)	3	0	0	3	4	21	−17	3	H2H	(Norway)	0-11	2-7	2-3	

=== Pool D ===
Boccia at the 2016 Summer Paralympics – Individual BC1 Pool D
Pos	Player	Pld	W	D	L	PF	PA	PD	Pts	H2H	Player	(Hong Kong)	(Greece)	(Argentina)	(Spain)
1 Q	Leung Mei Yee (HKG)	3	2	0	1	13	6	+7	7	H2H	(Hong Kong)		9-0	4-0	0-6
2 Q	P Soulanis (GRE)	3	2	0	1	12	14	-2	7	H2H	(Greece)	0-9		6-4	6-1
3	Sun Kai (ARG)	3	1	0	2	12	10	+2	5	H2H	(Argentina)	0-4	4-6		8-10
4	José Manuel Prado (ESP)	3	1	0	2	7	14	−7	5	H2H	(Spain)	6-0	1-6	0-8	
