= Thailand at the 2000 Summer Paralympics =

- IPC code: THA
- NPC: Paralympic Committee of Thailand
- Website: www.paralympicthai.com (in Thai and English)

in Sydney
- Competitors: 41
- Medals Ranked 30th: Gold 5 Silver 4 Bronze 2 Total 11

Summer Paralympics appearances (overview)
- 1984; 1988; 1992; 1996; 2000; 2004; 2008; 2012; 2016; 2020; 2024

Thailand competed at the 2000 Summer Paralympics in Sydney, Australia. 41 competitors from Thailand won 11 medals, including 5 gold, 4 silver and 2 bronze to finish 30th in the medal table.

== Medal table ==
Medal	Name	Sport	Event
Gold	Supachai Koysub	Athletics	Men's 200m T54
Gold	Prawat Wahoram	Athletics	Men's 5000m T54
Gold	Prawat Wahoram	Athletics	Men's 10000m T54
Gold	Sopa Intasen; Supachai Koysub; Ampai Sualuang; Prasitdhi Thongchuen	Athletics	Men's 4x100 relay T54
Gold	Somchai Doungkaew	Swimming	Men's 50m butterfly S4
Silver	Sopa Intasen	Athletics	Men's 100m T53
Silver	Prasitdhi Thongchuen; Sopa Intasen; Ampai Sualuang; Supachai Koysub	Athletics	Men's 4 × 400 m relay T54
Silver	Somchai Doungkaew	Swimming	Men's 150m individual medley SM3
Silver	Somkhoun Anon	Powerlifting	Women's -56 kg
Bronze	Saifon Kaewsri	Swimming	Men's 50m breaststroke SB2
Bronze	Thongsa Marasri	Powerlifting	Men's -48 kg

== See also ==
- Thailand at the Paralympics
- Thailand at the 2000 Summer Olympics
