= Thailand at the 1988 Summer Paralympics =

- IPC code: THA
- NPC: Paralympic Committee of Thailand
- Website: www.paralympicthai.com (in Thai and English)

in Seoul, South Korea
- Competitors: 10 in 2 sports
- Medals Ranked 45th: Gold 0 Silver 1 Bronze 0 Total 1

Summer Paralympics appearances (overview)
- 1984; 1988; 1992; 1996; 2000; 2004; 2008; 2012; 2016; 2020; 2024

Thailand competed at the 1988 Summer Paralympics in Seoul, South Korea. It was the country's second appearance at the Paralympic Games, following its debut in 1984.

Thailand was represented by ten competitors and won one silver medal, finishing joint 45th in the medal table with Czechoslovakia. The medal was won by Sakul Kumtan in the men's javelin A3A9 event in athletics, and was Thailand's first Paralympic medal.

== Competitors ==
Thailand sent ten competitors to the Games. Thai athletes competed in athletics and table tennis.

== Medalists ==
Medal	Name	Sport	Event	Result
Silver	Sakul Kumtan	Athletics	Men's javelin throw A3/A9	33.52 m

== Athletics ==
Thailand's only medal of the Games came in athletics, where Sakul Kumtan won silver in the men's javelin A3A9 with a throw of 33.52 metres. Kumtan also competed in the men's shot put A3A9 and discus throw A3A9, finishing seventh in both events.

Other Thai athletics results included a fourth-place finish by Boochit Aungkulanavin in the men's javelin A6A8A9L6 and an eighth-place finish by Pairot Saetan in the men's 200 m A6A8A9L4 final.

== Table tennis ==
Thailand also competed in table tennis. Sakul Kumtan competed in the men's singles TT2 event, while Sudjai Yamgate and Loy Harnarong competed in the men's singles TT6 event. None of the Thai table tennis players won a medal.

== See also ==
- Thailand at the Paralympics
- Thailand at the 1988 Summer Olympics
