= Thailand at the 2004 Summer Paralympics =

- IPC code: THA
- NPC: Paralympic Committee of Thailand
- Website: www.paralympicthai.com (in Thai and English)

in Athens
- Competitors: 43 in 7 sports
- Medals Ranked 35th: Gold 3 Silver 6 Bronze 6 Total 15

Summer Paralympics appearances (overview)
- 1984; 1988; 1992; 1996; 2000; 2004; 2008; 2012; 2016; 2020; 2024

Thailand competed at the 2004 Summer Paralympics in Athens, Greece. The team included 43 athletes, 33 men and 10 women. Competitors from Thailand won 15 medals, including 3 gold, 6 silver and 6 bronze to finish 35th in the medal table.

== Medallists ==
Medal	Name	Sport	Event
Gold	Supachai Koysub; Pichet Krungget; Rawat Tana; Prawat Wahorum	Athletics	Men's 4x100m relay T53/54
Gold	Supachai Koysub; Pichet Krungget; Rawat Tana; Prawat Wahorum	Athletics	Men's 4x400m relay T53/54
Gold	Saysunee Jana	Wheelchair fencing	Women's épée B
Silver	Wasana Karpmaichan	Archery	Women's individual standing
Silver	Prawat Wahorum	Athletics	Men's 10000m T54
Silver	Thongsa Marasri	Powerlifting	Men's 48kg
Silver	Somchai Doungkaew	Swimming	Men's 50m butterfly S4
Silver	Somchai Doungkaew	Swimming	Men's 50m breaststroke SB2
Silver	Sakhorn Khanthasit; Ratana Techamaneewat	Wheelchair tennis	Women's doubles
Bronze	Pichet Krungget	Athletics	Men's 200m T53
Bronze	Rawat Tana	Athletics	Men's 10000m T54
Bronze	Pattaya Tadtong	Boccia	Mixed individual BC1
Bronze	Panom Lagsanaprim	Swimming	Men's 100m breaststroke SB11
Bronze	Sanit Songnork	Swimming	Men's 150m individual medley SM4
Bronze	Saysunee Jana	Wheelchair fencing	Women's foil B

== Sports ==
=== Archery ===
==== Men ====
Athlete	Event	Ranking round		Round of 32	Round of 16	Quarterfinals	Semifinals	Finals	
Athlete	Event	Score	Seed	Opposition score	Opposition score	Opposition score	Opposition score	Opposition score	Rank
Wattana Martsuri	Men's individual W2	570	23	Baylis (GBR); L 140-155	did not advance				
Satein Peemthon	Men's individual W2	590	18	Sakodo (JPN); L 144-145	did not advance				

==== Women ====
Athlete	Event	Ranking round		Round of 32	Round of 16	Quarterfinals	Semifinals	Finals	
Athlete	Event	Score	Seed	Opposition score	Opposition score	Opposition score	Opposition score	Opposition score	Rank
Wasana Karpmaichan	Women's individual standing	521	12	N/A	Chapman (GBR); W 132-108	Lee (KOR); W 88-78	Panmai (THA); W 87-75	Wang (CHN); L 83-92	2nd place, silver medalist(s)
Ratchanee Panmai	Women's individual standing	530	9	N/A	Nikitenko (UKR); W 135-116	Carmichael (USA); W 98-91	Karpmaichan (THA); L 75-87	Olejnik (POL); L 77-93	4

=== Athletics ===
==== Men's track ====
Athlete	Class	Event	Heats		Semifinal		Final	
Athlete	Class	Event	Result	Rank	Result	Rank	Result	Rank
Sanguan Chanamal	T11	100m	12.49	20	did not advance			
Sopa Intasen	T53	100m	15.43	5 q	N/A		15.36	5
Sopa Intasen	T53	200m	26.93	7 q	N/A		27.25	4
Charam Kajornvech	T12	100m	11.52	15	did not advance			
Charam Kajornvech	T12	200m	24.04	18	did not advance			
Supachai Koysub	T54	100m	14.32	5 Q	14.65	5 Q	DSQ	
Supachai Koysub	T54	200m	25.70	4 Q	N/A		25.96	4
Pichet Krungget	T53	100m	15.16	2 Q	N/A		15.35	4
Pichet Krungget	T53	200m	26.77	4 Q	N/A		26.55	3rd place, bronze medalist(s)
Peth Rungsri	T52	100m	N/A				19.65	8
Peth Rungsri	T52	200m	33.73	5 Q	N/A		32.50	5
Peth Rungsri	T52	400m	2:11.31	7 Q	N/A		2:14.21	8
Ampai Sualuang	T54	100m	16.02	25	did not advance			
Ampai Sualuang	T54	200m	27.07	15	did not advance			
Rawat Tana	T54	800m	1:38.34	14	did not advance			
Rawat Tana	T54	1500m	3:01.15	6 q	DNF		did not advance	
Rawat Tana	T54	10000m	21:08.77	1 Q	N/A		20:53.38	3rd place, bronze medalist(s)
Prasit Thongchuen	T54	100m	15.13	17	did not advance			
Prasit Thongchuen	T54	200m	27.03	14	did not advance			
Prasit Thongchuen	T54	800m	1:37.17	12	did not advance			
Prawat Wahorum	T54	800m	1:35.93	6 q	N/A		1:33.03	7
Prawat Wahorum	T54	1500m	3:08.24	18 Q	3:04.85	4 q	3:06.15	7
Prawat Wahorum	T54	5000m	10:29.43	9 Q	N/A		10:25.56	8
Prawat Wahorum	T54	10000m	21:47.93	10 Q	N/A		20:52.10	2nd place, silver medalist(s)
Supachai Koysub; Pichet Krungget; Rawat Tana; Prawat Wahorum	T53/54	4x100m relay	51.98 WR	1 Q	N/A		51.99	1st place, gold medalist(s)
Supachai Koysub; Pichet Krungget; Rawat Tana; Prawat Wahorum	T53/54	4x400m relay	3:16.56	3 Q	N/A		3:12.73 WR	1st place, gold medalist(s)

==== Men's field ====
Athlete	Class	Event	Final		
Athlete	Class	Event	Result	Points	Rank
Angkarn Chanaboon	F44/46	Javelin	39.08	702	10
Satian Thongdee	F42	Javelin	44.90	-	5

=== Boccia ===
==== Individual events ====
Athlete	Event	Preliminaries			Round of 16	Quarterfinals	Semifinals	Final	
Athlete	Event	Opponent	Opposition Score	Rank	Opposition Score	Opposition Score	Opposition Score	Opposition Score	Rank
Pattaya Padtong	Mixed individual BC1	Aandalen (NOR)	W 3-2	1 Q	N/A	Taksee (THA); W 6-0	Fernandez (POR); L 1-5	Grossmayer (AUT); W 4-3	3rd place, bronze medalist(s)
Pattaya Padtong	Mixed individual BC1	Bak-Pedersen (DEN)	W 6-5	1 Q	N/A	Taksee (THA); W 6-0	Fernandez (POR); L 1-5	Grossmayer (AUT); W 4-3	3rd place, bronze medalist(s)
Pattaya Padtong	Mixed individual BC1	Leung (HKG)	W 5-2	1 Q	N/A	Taksee (THA); W 6-0	Fernandez (POR); L 1-5	Grossmayer (AUT); W 4-3	3rd place, bronze medalist(s)
Pattaya Padtong	Mixed individual BC1	Marques (POR)	L 2-4	1 Q	N/A	Taksee (THA); W 6-0	Fernandez (POR); L 1-5	Grossmayer (AUT); W 4-3	3rd place, bronze medalist(s)
Pattaya Padtong	Mixed individual BC1	Wilhelmsen (NOR)	W 14-0	1 Q	N/A	Taksee (THA); W 6-0	Fernandez (POR); L 1-5	Grossmayer (AUT); W 4-3	3rd place, bronze medalist(s)
Chaiyaporn Taksee	Mixed individual BC1	Beltran (ESP)	L 4-6	2 Q	N/A	Padtong (THA); L 0-6	did not advance		
Chaiyaporn Taksee	Mixed individual BC1	Shelly (IRL)	W 9-2	2 Q	N/A	Padtong (THA); L 0-6	did not advance		
Chaiyaporn Taksee	Mixed individual BC1	Pearse (GBR)	W 7-1	2 Q	N/A	Padtong (THA); L 0-6	did not advance		
Chaiyaporn Taksee	Mixed individual BC1	Villano (ARG)	L 4-7	2 Q	N/A	Padtong (THA); L 0-6	did not advance		
Chaiyaporn Taksee	Mixed individual BC1	Gahleitner (AUT)	W 6-3	2 Q	N/A	Padtong (THA); L 0-6	did not advance		
Supaporn Maleemao	Mixed individual BC2	Silva (POR)	L 3-5	3 Q	Ferreira (POR); L 2-4	did not advance			
Supaporn Maleemao	Mixed individual BC2	McLeod (CAN)	L 2-5	3 Q	Ferreira (POR); L 2-4	did not advance			
Supaporn Maleemao	Mixed individual BC2	Olsen (NOR)	W 16-0	3 Q	Ferreira (POR); L 2-4	did not advance			
Auranee Mongkolpun	Mixed individual BC2	Steirer (AUT)	L 3-4	3 Q	Murray (GBR); L 1-5	did not advance			
Auranee Mongkolpun	Mixed individual BC2	Siddiqi (DEN)	L 3-4	3 Q	Murray (GBR); L 1-5	did not advance			
Auranee Mongkolpun	Mixed individual BC2	Murphy (IRL)	W 10-0	3 Q	Murray (GBR); L 1-5	did not advance			

==== Team ====
Athlete	Event	Preliminaries			Semifinals	Final	
Athlete	Event	Opponent	Opposition Score	Rank	Opposition Score	Opposition Score	Rank
Supaporn Maleemao; Auranee Mongkolpun; Pattaya Padtong; Chaiyaporn Taksee	Mixed team BC1-2	Portugal (POR)	L 3-7	5	did not advance		
Supaporn Maleemao; Auranee Mongkolpun; Pattaya Padtong; Chaiyaporn Taksee	Mixed team BC1-2	New Zealand (NZL)	L 0-7	5	did not advance		
Supaporn Maleemao; Auranee Mongkolpun; Pattaya Padtong; Chaiyaporn Taksee	Mixed team BC1-2	Hong Kong (HKG)	W 5-4	5	did not advance		
Supaporn Maleemao; Auranee Mongkolpun; Pattaya Padtong; Chaiyaporn Taksee	Mixed team BC1-2	Ireland (IRL)	L 1-11	5	did not advance		
Supaporn Maleemao; Auranee Mongkolpun; Pattaya Padtong; Chaiyaporn Taksee	Mixed team BC1-2	Denmark (DEN)	W 11-3	5	did not advance		

=== Powerlifting ===
==== Men ====
Athlete	Event	Result	Rank
Thongsa Marasri	48kg	165.0	2nd place, silver medalist(s)
Nirut Saneebutr	100kg	230.0	4

==== Women ====
Athlete	Event	Result	Rank
Somkhoun Anon	48kg	85.0	4
Arawan Bootpo	56kg	85.0	6

=== Swimming ===
Athlete	Class	Event	Heats		Final	
Athlete	Class	Event	Result	Rank	Result	Rank
Arpiwat Aranghiran	S11	50m freestyle	28.68	7 Q	28.58	6
Arpiwat Aranghiran	S11	100m freestyle	1:08.17	9	did not advance	
Arpiwat Aranghiran	S11	100m butterfly	1:21.07	6 Q	1:15.44	6
Somchai Doungkaew	S4	50m butterfly	45.75 WR	1 Q	45.59	2nd place, silver medalist(s)
Somchai Doungkaew	SB2	50m breaststroke	1:05.61	3 Q	1:01.17	2nd place, silver medalist(s)
Somchai Doungkaew	SM3	150m individual medley	3:09.75	1 Q	3:12.43	4
Voravit Kaewkham	S5	50m freestyle	40.68	8 Q	39.23	7
Voravit Kaewkham	S5	100m freestyle	1:34.25	10	did not advance	
Voravit Kaewkham	S5	200m freestyle	3:49.84	9	did not advance	
Voravit Kaewkham	S5	50m butterfly	41.18	5 Q	40.44	4
Voravit Kaewkham	SM5	200m individual medley	4:01.65	10	did not advance	
Panom Lagsanaprim	S11	50m freestyle	31.07	14	did not advance	
Panom Lagsanaprim	SB11	100m breaststroke	1:21.60	3 Q	1:21.05	3rd place, bronze medalist(s)
Luan Lioonrum	SB5	100m breaststroke	1:49.66	10	did not advance	
Prasit Marnnok	SB11	100m breaststroke	1:25.19	6 Q	1:23.12	4
Somchai Nakprom	S13	100m backstroke	1:21.14	10	did not advance	
Somchai Nakprom	S13	100m butterfly	1:07.47	7 Q	1:07.46	7
Prajim Rieangsantien	S6	100m backstroke	1:28.62	9	did not advance	
Prajim Rieangsantien	SM6	200m individual medley	3:28.92	12	did not advance	
Taweesook Samuksaneeto	SB5	100m breaststroke	1:46.40	9	did not advance	
Sutat Sawattarn	S13	400m freestyle	5:16.15	10	did not advance	
Sutat Sawattarn	S13	100m backstroke	1:17.07	9	did not advance	
Sanit Songnork	S5	50m freestyle	40.52	7 Q	40.10	8
Sanit Songnork	SB3	50m breaststroke	58.20	7 Q	57.55	7
Sanit Songnork	SM4	150m individual medley	2:47.35	4 Q	2:42.57	3rd place, bronze medalist(s)
Kitipong Sribunreung	S12	400m freestyle	5:42.50	13	did not advance	
Kitipong Sribunreung	SB12	100m breaststroke	1:16.95	9	did not advance	
Somchai Doungkaew; Voravit Kaewkham; Taweesook Samuksaneeto; Sanit Songnork	N/A	4x50m freestyle relay (20pts)	2:46.41	6 Q	2:41.43	6
Somchai Doungkaew; Voravit Kaewkham; Prajim Rieangsantien; Taweesook Samuksaneeto	N/A	4x50m medley relay (20pts)	2:51.90	3 Q	2:50.62	5
Arpiwat Aranghiran; Somchai Nakprom; Sutat Sawattarn; Kitipong Sribunrueng	N/A	4x100m freestyle relay (49pts)	N/A		4:16.68	5
Arpiwat Aranghiran; Somchai Nakprom; Sutat Sawattarn; Kitipong Sribunrueng	N/A	4x100m medley relay (49pts)	N/A		4:47.31	5

=== Wheelchair fencing ===
==== Women ====
Athlete	Event	Qualification			Round of 16	Quarterfinal	Semifinal	Final / BM	
Athlete	Event	Opposition	Score	Rank	Opposition Score	Opposition Score	Opposition Score	Opposition Score	Rank
Saysunee Jana	Women's épée B	Chan (HKG)	L 3–5	2 Q	Hickey (USA); W 15-1	Vettraino (ITA); W 15–13	Wyrzykowska (POL); W 15–9	Chan (HKG); W 15-13	1st place, gold medalist(s)
Saysunee Jana	Women's épée B	Palfi (HUN)	W 5-1	2 Q	Hickey (USA); W 15-1	Vettraino (ITA); W 15–13	Wyrzykowska (POL); W 15–9	Chan (HKG); W 15-13	1st place, gold medalist(s)
Saysunee Jana	Women's épée B	Hickey (USA)	W 5-1	2 Q	Hickey (USA); W 15-1	Vettraino (ITA); W 15–13	Wyrzykowska (POL); W 15–9	Chan (HKG); W 15-13	1st place, gold medalist(s)
Saysunee Jana	Women's épée B	Stollwerck (GER)	W 5-2	2 Q	Hickey (USA); W 15-1	Vettraino (ITA); W 15–13	Wyrzykowska (POL); W 15–9	Chan (HKG); W 15-13	1st place, gold medalist(s)
Saysunee Jana	Women's foil B	Palfi (HUN)	W 5-0	1 Q	Bye	Wyrzykowska (POL); W 15-7	Chan (HKG); L 12-15	Hickey (USA); W 15-5	3rd place, bronze medalist(s)
Saysunee Jana	Women's foil B	Magnat (FRA)	W 5-0	1 Q	Bye	Wyrzykowska (POL); W 15-7	Chan (HKG); L 12-15	Hickey (USA); W 15-5	3rd place, bronze medalist(s)
Saysunee Jana	Women's foil B	Weber Kranz (GER)	W 5-2	1 Q	Bye	Wyrzykowska (POL); W 15-7	Chan (HKG); L 12-15	Hickey (USA); W 15-5	3rd place, bronze medalist(s)
Saysunee Jana	Women's foil B	Vettraino (ITA)	W 5-2	1 Q	Bye	Wyrzykowska (POL); W 15-7	Chan (HKG); L 12-15	Hickey (USA); W 15-5	3rd place, bronze medalist(s)

=== Wheelchair tennis ===
==== Men ====
Athlete	Class	Event	Round of 64	Round of 32	Round of 16	Quarterfinals	Semifinals	Finals
Athlete	Class	Event	Opposition Result	Opposition Result	Opposition Result	Opposition Result	Opposition Result	Opposition Result
Sumrerng Kruamai	Open	Men's singles	Quintero (USA); L 6–7, 1–6	did not advance				
Wittaya Peem Mee	Open	Men's singles	Legner (AUT); L 2-6, 0-6	did not advance				
Sumrerng Kruamai; Wittaya Peem Mee	Open	Men's doubles	N/A	Peinsith (AUT) / Krieghofer (AUT); W 6-2, 6-3	Bonaccurso (AUS) / Hall (AUS); L 1-6, 3-6	did not advance		

==== Women ====
Athlete	Class	Event	Round of 32	Round of 16	Quarterfinals	Semifinals	Finals
Athlete	Class	Event	Opposition Result	Opposition Result	Opposition Result	Opposition Result	Opposition Result
Sakhorn Khanthasit	Open	Women's singles	Simard (CAN); W 6–3, 6–4	Dong (CHN); W 6–0, 6–1	Vergeer (NED); L 3–6, 1-6	did not advance	
Pi Wen Lu	Open	Women's singles	Verfuerth (USA); L 6-7, 0-6	did not advance			
Sakhorn Khanthasit; Ratana Techamaneewat	Open	Women's doubles	N/A	Chokyu (CAN) / Simard (CAN); W 6-1, 6-1	Griffioen (NED) / Peters (NED); W 6-2, 6-3	Suter Erath (SUI) / Kalt (SUI); W 7-5, 6-0	Smit (NED) / Vergeer (NED); L 0-6, 4-6 (silver)

== See also ==
- Thailand at the Paralympics
- Thailand at the 2004 Summer Olympics
