= Zoe Robinson =

British boccia player

Medal record

Boccia

Representing Great Britain

Paralympic Games
Gold medal – first place	2008 Beijing	Mixed Team BC1-2
Bronze medal – third place	2012 London	Mixed Team BC1-2

Zoe Robinson is a British boccia player who won a gold medal in the Team BC1–2 event at the 2008 Summer Paralympics in Beijing, China. She went on to win a bronze in the same event at the 2012 Summer Paralympics in London, UK.

== Life ==
Robinson was born in Bury and went to school in the Tottington area of Greater Manchester.

At the 2008 Games Robinson competed in the BC1-2 mixed team and the B2 mixed individual events. She was eliminated at the group stage of the individual competition after losing all three of her matches. Alongside Robinson in the British quartet for the BC1-2 team competition were Nigel Murray, the individual silver medallist in Beijing who had previously won gold at the 2000 Summer Paralympics, Dan Bentley and David Smith. Victories over Canada, Argentina, Norway and China earned Great Britain a place in the final against reigning gold medallists Portugal. An 8−4 win gave Britain their first ever team gold in Paralympic Boccia.
