= Boccia at the 2012 Summer Paralympics =

Boccia at the XIV Paralympic Games
- Venue: ExCeL
- Dates: 2 – 8 September 2012
- Competitors: 104

Boccia at the 2012 Summer Paralympics was held in the ExCeL from 2 September to 8 September, with a maximum of 104 athletes (80 men, 24 women) competing in seven events. There were four individual events, two pair events, and one team event.

== Classification ==
When competing in boccia at national or international level, the athletes were competing in events with different classifications, based on level of physical disability.

- BC1 - Cerebral palsy.
  - Locomotor dysfunction affecting the whole body.
  - Use hands or feet to propel the ball into play
  - May be assisted by an aide.
- BC2 - Cerebral palsy.
  - Locomotor dysfunction affecting the whole body
  - Use hands to propel the ball into play
  - Not assisted by an aide.
- BC3 - Cerebral palsy or another disability.
  - Locomotor dysfunction in all four limbs.
  - Use the help of a ramp to propel the ball into play.
  - Assisted by an aide (ramper).
- BC4 - Not cerebral palsy, but another disability, for example muscular dystrophy or tetraplegia.
  - Locomotor dysfunction in all four limbs
  - Use hands to propel the ball into play
  - Not assisted by an aide.

== Events ==
Mixed

- Individual
  - BC1
  - BC2
  - BC3
  - BC4
- Team
  - BC1/BC2
- Pairs
  - BC3
  - BC4

== Qualification ==
The athlete quota for boccia is 104 athletes, 80 men and 24 women. Each National Paralympic Committee (NPC) can have up to a maximum of nine athletes (one team of four, one pair of three, and one pair of two) in team and pair events, and 12 in individual events. Athletes must be on the CPISRA Boccia Individual World Ranking List, to be eligible for selection. Athletes who wish to qualify for the Paralympics need to be on the ranking list closing 31 December 2011.

=== Qualification timeline ===
Event	Date	Venue	Type
CPISRA Boccia European Championship	25 June – 2 July 2009	(Portugal) Póvoa de Varzim	Individual, Teams, Pairs
CPISRA Boccia Asia & South Pacific Championship	14–22 August 2009	(Hong Kong) Tsim Sha Tsui	Individual, Teams, Pairs
CPISRA Boccia America's Cup	24–29 October 2009	(Canada) Montreal	Individual, Teams, Pairs
CPISRA Boccia World Championship	30 May – 10 June 2010	(Portugal) Lisbon	Individual, Teams, Pairs
2010 Asian Para Games	12–19 December 2010	(China) Guangzhou	Individual
2011 CPISRA Boccia World Cup	18–27 August 2011	(United Kingdom) Coleraine	Individual, Teams, Pairs
2011 CPISRA European Cup	28 Oktober–1 November 2011	(Norway) Hamar	Individual
2011 Parapan American Games	19–27 November 2011	(Mexico) Guadalajara	Individual

=== Qualified teams ===
Competition	BC1/BC2 Team	BC3 Pairs	BC4 Pairs
Host Nation	Great Britain (GBR)	Great Britain (GBR)	Great Britain (GBR)
CPISRA Boccia Teams and Pairs World Ranking	South Korea (KOR) Thailand (THA); Spain (ESP); Japan (JPN); Portugal (POR); China (CHN); Brazil (BRA); Ireland (IRL); Canada (CAN); Argentina (ARG); Hong Kong (HKG)	Greece (GRE) Portugal (POR); Belgium (BEL); Japan (JPN); South Korea (KOR); Canada (CAN); Thailand (THA)	Brazil (BRA) Thailand (THA); Czech Republic (CZE); Hong Kong (HKG); Canada (CAN); Slovakia (SVK); Portugal (POR)

== Participating nations ==
103 competitors from 21 nations competed.

- Argentina (4)
- Belgium (3)
- Brazil (7)
- Canada (9)
- China (5)
- Czech Republic (3)
- Great Britain (9)
- Greece (5)
- Hong Kong (6)
- Ireland (5)
- Japan (5)
- Mexico (1)
- Norway (1)
- Portugal (9)
- Singapore (1)
- Slovakia (5)
- South Korea (7)
- Spain (8)
- Sweden (1)
- Thailand (8)
- United States (1)

== Medal summary ==
=== Medal table ===
Rank	Nation	Gold	Silver	Bronze	Total
1	Brazil (BRA)	3	0	1	4
2	Thailand (THA)	2	0	0	2
3	South Korea (KOR)	1	1	1	3
4	Greece (GRE)	1	0	0	1
5	China (CHN)	0	3	0	3
6	Great Britain (GBR)	0	1	1	2
6	Portugal (POR)	0	1	1	2
8	Czech Republic (CZE)	0	1	0	1
9	Belgium (BEL)	0	0	1	1
9	Canada (CAN)	0	0	1	1
9	Norway (NOR)	0	0	1	1
Totals (11 entries)		7	7	7	21

=== Medalists ===
Event	Gold	Silver	Bronze
Individual BC1	Pattaya Tadtong; Thailand	David Smith; Great Britain	Roger Aandalen; Norway
Individual BC2	Maciel Sousa Santos; Brazil	Yan Zhiqiang; China	Jeong So-yeong; South Korea
Individual BC3	Choi Ye-jin; South Korea	Jeong Ho-won; South Korea	José Macedo; Portugal
Individual BC4	Dirceu Pinto; Brazil	Yuansen Zheng; China	Eliseu dos Santos; Brazil
Team BC1–2	Thailand (THA); Witsanu Huadpradit; Mongkol Jitsa-Ngiem; Pattaya Tadtong; Watcharaphon Vongsa	China (CHN); Zhiqiang Yan; Weibo Yuan; Qi Zhang; Kai Zhong	Great Britain (GBR); Dan Bentley; Nigel Murray; Zoe Robinson; David Smith
Pairs BC3	Greece (GRE); Maria-Eleni Kordali; Nikolaos Pananos; Grigorios Polychronidis	Portugal (POR); Armando Costa; José Macedo; Luis Silva	Belgium (BEL); Pieter Cilissen; Kirsten de Laender; Pieter Verlinden
Pairs BC4	Brazil (BRA); Dirceu Pinto; Eliseu dos Santos	Czech Republic (CZE); Radek Procházka; Leoš Lacina	Canada (CAN); Marco Dispaltro; Josh Vander Vies
