= Boccia at the 2012 Summer Paralympics – Team BC1–2 =

Boccia – Team BC1–2 at the XIV Paralympic Games
- Venue: ExCeL London
- Dates: 2 September 2012 – 4 September 2012
- Teams: 12

Medalists
1st place, gold medalist(s)		Witsanu Huadpradit; Mongkol Jitsa-Ngiem; Pattaya Tadtong; Watcharaphon Vongsa	Thailand
2nd place, silver medalist(s)		Yan Zhiqiang; Weibo Yuan; Zhang Qi; Kai Zhong	China
3rd place, bronze medalist(s)		Dan Bentley; Nigel Murray; Zoe Robinson; David Smith	Great Britain

The mixed team BC1–2 boccia event at the 2012 Summer Paralympics was contested from 2 to 4 September at ExCeL London.

== Team rosters ==
Argentina (ARG)
Name	Gender	Class
Pablo Cortez	M	BC2
Pablo Gonzalez	M	BC2
Mauricio Ibarbure	M	BC1
Gabriela Villano	F	BC1

Brazil (BRA)
Name	Gender	Class
José Carlos Chagas de Oliveira	M	BC1
Luísa Lisboa dos Reis	F	BC2
Natali Mello de Faria	F	BC2
Maciel Sousa Santos	M	BC2

Canada (CAN)
Name	Gender	Class
Adam Dukovich	M	BC2
Tammy Mcleod	F	BC2
Brock Richardson	M	BC1
Dave Richer	M	BC2

China (CHN)
Name	Gender	Class
Yan Zhiqiang	M	BC2
Weibo Yuan	M	BC1
Zhang Qi	F	BC1
Kai Zhong	M	BC2

Great Britain (GBR)
Name	Gender	Class
Dan Bentley	M	BC2
Nigel Murray	M	BC2
Zoe Robinson	F	BC2
David Smith	M	BC1

Hong Kong (HKG)
Name	Gender	Class
Karen Kwok	F	BC2
Mei Yee Leung	F	BC1
Kam Lung Wong	M	BC1
Hiu Lam Yeung	F	BC2

Ireland (IRL)
Name	Gender	Class
Roberta Connolly	F	BC2
Tom Leahy	M	BC2
Padraic Moran	M	BC2
Gabriel Shelly	M	BC1

Japan (JPN)
Name	Gender	Class
Taemi Akimoto	F	BC1
Takayuki Hirose	M	BC2
Yuriko Shibayama	F	BC1
Hidetaka Sugimura	M	BC2

Portugal (POR)
Name	Gender	Class
João Paulo Fernandes	M	BC1
Fernando Ferreira	M	BC2
Cristina Goncalves	F	BC2
Abílio Valente	M	BC2

South Korea (KOR)
Name	Gender	Class
So-Yeong Jeong	F	BC2
Kwang-Min Ji	M	BC1
Myeong-Su Kim	M	BC1
Jeong-Min Sohn	M	BC2

Spain (ESP)
Name	Gender	Class
Francisco Beltran Manero	M	BC1
Pedro Cordero Martin	M	BC2
Manuel Martin Perez	M	BC2
Jose Prado Prado	M	BC1

Thailand (THA)
Name	Gender	Class
Witsanu Huadpradit	M	BC1
Mongkol Jitsa-Ngiem	M	BC2
Pattaya Tadtong	M	BC1
Watcharaphon Vongsa	M	BC2

== Group stage ==
=== Group A ===
Team	Pld	W	L	PF	PA	PD
South Korea (KOR)	2	2	0	24	6	18
Brazil (BRA)	2	1	1	14	12	2
Ireland (IRL)	2	0	2	5	25	–20

=== Group B ===
Team	Pld	W	L	PF	PA	PD
Thailand (THA)	2	2	0	30	3	27
China (CHN)	2	1	1	8	13	–5
Canada (CAN)	2	0	2	5	27	–22

=== Group C ===
Team	Pld	W	L	PF	PA	PD
Great Britain (GBR)	2	2	0	13	8	5
Portugal (POR)	2	1	1	10	10	0
Argentina (ARG)	2	0	2	9	14	–5

=== Group D ===
Team	Pld	W	L	PF	PA	PD
Japan (JPN)	2	2	0	15	9	6
Hong Kong (HKG)	2	1	1	12	11	1
Spain (ESP)	2	0	2	7	14	–7

== Knockout stage ==
Quarterfinals
A1	South Korea (KOR)	6
B2	China (CHN)	6*
D1	Japan (JPN)	2
C2	Portugal (POR)	10
B1	Thailand (THA)	11
A2	Brazil (BRA)	1
C1	Great Britain (GBR)	11
D2	Hong Kong (HKG)	3

Semifinals
B2	China (CHN)	6
C2	Portugal (POR)	4
B1	Thailand (THA)	18
C1	Great Britain (GBR)	1

Gold medal match
B2	China (CHN)	5
B1	Thailand (THA)	10
Bronze medal match
C2	Portugal (POR)	5
C1	Great Britain (GBR)	7
