= Swimming at the 2000 Summer Paralympics – Men's 150 metre individual medley SM3 =

Men's 150m individual medley SM3 at the XI Paralympic Games
- Paralympic Swimming
- Venue: Sydney International Aquatic Centre
- Dates: 20 October 2000

Medalists
1st place, gold medalist(s)		Juan Ignacio Reyes	Mexico
2nd place, silver medalist(s)		Somchai Doungkaew	Thailand
3rd place, bronze medalist(s)		Genezi Andrade	Brazil

The men's 150m individual medley SM3 event took place on 20 October 2000 in Sydney, Australia.

== Results ==
=== Final ===
Rank	Athlete	Time	Notes
1st place, gold medalist(s)	Juan Ignacio Reyes (MEX)	3:06.44	WR
2nd place, silver medalist(s)	Somchai Doungkaew (THA)	3:13.49	
3rd place, bronze medalist(s)	Genezi Andrade (BRA)	3:34.97	
4	Stig Morten Sandvik (NOR)	3:40.36	
5	Claude Badie (FRA)	3:46.97	
6	Saifon Kaewsri (THA)	3:49.31	
7	Andrej Zatko (SVK)	4:06.23	
