= Athletics at the 2000 Summer Paralympics – Men's 100 metres T53 =

Men's 100 metres T53 at the XI Paralympic Games
- Venue: Stadium Australia
- Competitors: 14 from 10 nations
- Winning time: 15.59

Medalists
1st place, gold medalist(s)		John Lindsay	Australia
2nd place, silver medalist(s)		Sopa Intasen	Thailand
3rd place, bronze medalist(s)		Hamad Aladwani	Kuwait

The men's 100 metres T53 took place in Stadium Australia.

There were two heats and one final round. The T53 is for athletes who have good function in their arms but limited trunk function.

== Heats ==
Qualified for final round

=== Heat 1 ===
Rank	Athlete	Time	Notes
1	Hamad Aladwani (KUW)	16.24	
2	Barry Patriquin (CAN)	16.62	
3	Mikhail Terentiev (RUS)	16.65	
4	Christopher Waddell (USA)	16.71	
5	Eric Gauthier (CAN)	16.75	
6	Ayed Alhababi (UAE)	17.36	
7	Terje Jentoft Roel (NOR)	18.08	

=== Heat 2 ===
Rank	Athlete	Time	Notes
1	John Lindsay (AUS)	15.45	
2	Jaime Ramirez Valencia (MEX)	15.94	
3	Sergey Shilov (RUS)	16.17	
4	Sopa Intasen (THA)	16.17	
5	John Fulham (IRL)	16.38	
6	Jacques Bouchard (CAN)	16.76	
7	Eric Kaiser (USA)	17.60	

== Final round ==
Rank	Athlete	Time	Notes
1st place, gold medalist(s)	John Lindsay (AUS)	15.59	
2nd place, silver medalist(s)	Sopa Intasen (THA)	16.13	
3rd place, bronze medalist(s)	Hamad Aladwani (KUW)	16.16	
4	Jaime Ramirez Valencia (MEX)	16.20	
5	Mikhail Terentiev (RUS)	16.28	
6	Barry Patriquin (CAN)	16.36	
7	Sergey Shilov (RUS)	16.48	
8	John Fulham (IRL)	16.64	
