= Thailand at the 1992 Summer Paralympics =

- IPC code: THA
- NPC: Paralympic Committee of Thailand
- Website: www.paralympicthai.com (in Thai and English)

in Barcelona
- Competitors: 5
- Medals Ranked 55th: Gold 0 Silver 0 Bronze 1 Total 1

Summer Paralympics appearances (overview)
- 1984; 1988; 1992; 1996; 2000; 2004; 2008; 2012; 2016; 2020; 2024

Thailand competed at the 1992 Summer Paralympics in Barcelona,Madrid Spain. 5 competitors from Thailand won a single bronze medal and finished joint 55th in the medal table along with 7 other countries.

== See also ==
- Thailand at the Paralympics
- Thailand at the 1992 Summer Olympics
