= Patriquin =

Patriquin is a French surname

Notable people with the surname Patriquin include:

- Barry Patriquin (born 1962), Canadian paralympic athlete
- Donald Patriquin (born 1938), Canadian composer, organist, and choral conductor
- Hayden Patriquin (born 2006), American professional pickleball player
- Wendy Patriquin, 2003 Canadian mayoral candidate
