= Boccia at the 2012 Summer Paralympics – Individual BC1 =

Boccia – Individual BC1 at the XIV Paralympic Games
- Venue: ExCeL London
- Dates: 5 September 2012 – 8 September 2012
- Competitors: 19 from 15 nations

Medalists
1st place, gold medalist(s)		Pattaya Tadtong	Thailand
2nd place, silver medalist(s)		David Smith	Great Britain
3rd place, bronze medalist(s)		Roger Aandalen	Norway

The individual BC1 boccia event at the 2012 Summer Paralympics was contested from 5 to 8 September at ExCeL London.

== Seeding matches ==
Two preliminary matches were held to determine the participants' seed for the tournament bracket.

Match 56
1	Roger Aandalen (NOR)	3*
2	Panagiotis Soulanis (GRE)	3

Match 57
1	Eduardo Ventura Flores (MEX)	6
2	Jakub Nagy (SVK)	1

== Draw ==
=== Finals ===
Semifinals
Jose Carlos Chagas de Oliveira (BRA)	2
Pattaya Tadtong (THA)	5
Roger Aandalen (NOR)	2
David Smith (GBR)	5

Gold medal match
Pattaya Tadtong (THA)	7
David Smith (GBR)	0
Bronze medal match
Jose Carlos Chagas de Oliveira (BRA)	4
Roger Aandalen (NOR)	6

=== 5th–8th place matches ===
Semifinals
Myeong-Su Kim (KOR)	2
João Paulo Fernandes (POR)	3
Witsanu Huadpradit (THA)	3
Qi Zhang (CHN)	6

5th–6th place match
João Paulo Fernandes (POR)	3
Qi Zhang (CHN)	2
7th–8th place match
Myeong-Su Kim (KOR)	0
Witsanu Huadpradit (THA)	11

=== Top half ===
First round
José Carlos Chagas de Oliveira (BRA)	4
Jakub Nagy (SVK)	2

Second round
Kwang-Min Ji (KOR)	3
José Carlos Chagas de Oliveira (BRA)	3*
Myeong-Su Kim (KOR)	5
Panagiotis Soulanis (GRE)	0
Witsanu Huadpradit (THA)	5
Weibo Yuan (CHN)	1
José Prado Prado (ESP)	4
Pattaya Tadtong (THA)	5

Quarterfinals
Jose Carlos Chagas de Oliveira (BRA)	7
Myeong-Su Kim (KOR)	1
Witsanu Huadpradit (THA)	0
Pattaya Tadtong (THA)	7

Semifinals
José Carlos Chagas de Oliveira (BRA)	2
Pattaya Tadtong (THA)	5

=== Bottom half ===
First round
Mei Yee Leung (HKG)	6
Eduardo Ventura Flores (MEX)	2
Yuriko Shibayama (JPN)	5
Brock Richardson (CAN)	0

Second round
João Paulo Fernandes (POR)	6
Mei Yee Leung (HKG)	1
Mauricio Ibarbure (ARG)	1
Roger Aandalen (NOR)	5
Qi Zhang (CHN)	9
Kam Lung Wong (HKG)	1
Yuriko Shibayama (JPN)	4
David Smith (GBR)	6

Quarterfinals
João Paulo Fernandes (POR)	3
Roger Aandalen (NOR)	3*
Qi Zhang (CHN)	2
David Smith (GBR)	4

Semifinals
Roger Aandalen (NOR)	2
David Smith (GBR)	5

== Final ranking ==
1st place, gold medalist(s)	Pattaya Tadtong (THA)
2nd place, silver medalist(s)	David Smith (GBR)
3rd place, bronze medalist(s)	Roger Aandalen (NOR)
4	José Carlos Chagas de Oliveira (BRA)
5	João Paulo Fernandes (POR)
6	Qi Zhang (CHN)
7	Witsanu Huadpradit (THA)
8	Myeong-Su Kim (KOR)
