= Thailand at the 1996 Summer Paralympics =

- IPC code: THA
- NPC: Paralympic Committee of Thailand
- Website: www.paralympicthai.com (in Thai and English)

in Atlanta
- Competitors: 7
- Medals Ranked 57th: Gold 0 Silver 0 Bronze 2 Total 2

Summer Paralympics appearances (overview)
- 1984; 1988; 1992; 1996; 2000; 2004; 2008; 2012; 2016; 2020; 2024

Seven male athletes from Thailand competed at the 1996 Summer Paralympics in Atlanta, United States. Two men won bronze medals for their country.

== Medallists ==
Medal	Name	Sport	Event
Bronze	Prasopchoke Klunngern	Athletics	Men's 10,000m T52-53
Bronze	Panom Lagsanaprim	Swimming	Men's 100m breaststroke B1

== See also ==
- Thailand at the Paralympics
- Thailand at the 1996 Summer Olympics
