= Daniel Perez (boccia) =

Dutch paralympic boccia player

Personal information
- Nationality: Dutch
- Born: 26 October 1981 (age 44) Oldenzaal, Netherlands

Sport
- Country: Netherlands
- Sport: Boccia
- Disability: Cerebral palsy
- Disability class: BC1
Medal record
Boccia
Representing Netherlands
Paralympic Games
Silver medal – second place	2016 Rio de Janeiro	Individual BC1

Daniel Perez (born 26 October 1981) is a Dutch paralympic boccia player. He participated at the 2016 Summer Paralympics in the boccia competition, being awarded the silver medal in the individual BC1 event.
