= Wheelchair fencing at the 2012 Summer Paralympics – Women's épée B =

Women's Épée B at the XIV Paralympic Games
- Venue: ExCeL Exhibition Centre
- Dates: 5 September 2012
- Competitors: 11 from 10 nations

Medalists
1st place, gold medalist(s)		Saysunee Jana	Thailand
2nd place, silver medalist(s)		Simone Briese-Baetke	Germany
3rd place, bronze medalist(s)		Chan Yui Chong	Hong Kong

The women's épée category B fencing competition at the 2012 Summer Paralympics was held on 5 September 2012 at the ExCeL Exhibition Centre in London. This class was for athletes who had good trunk control and their fencing arm was not affected by their impairment.

== Schedule ==
All times are British Summer Time (UTC+1)

Date	Time	Round
5 September 2012	09:30	Qualification
5 September 2012	13:45	Quarter-finals
5 September 2012	17:45	Semi-finals
5 September 2012	18:30	Final

== Competition format ==
The tournament started with a group phase round-robin followed by a knockout stage. During a qualification round-robin, bouts last a maximum of three minutes, or until one athlete has scored five hits. There is then a knockout phase, in which bouts last a maximum of nine minutes (three periods of three minutes), or until one athlete has scored 15 hits.

== Results ==
=== Qualification ===
==== Pool A ====
Athlete	B	V	V/B	HS	HD	Hong Kong (HKG)	Ukraine (UKR)	Belarus (BLR)	Poland (POL)	France (FRA)
Chan Yui Chong (HKG)	4	3	0.75	18	11	—	4–5	5–4	5–0	5–3
Tetiana Pozniak (UKR)	4	3	0.75	14	9	5–4	—	3–1	1–5	5–3
Liudmila Lemiashkevich (BLR)	4	2	0.50	15	9	4–5	1–3	—	5–4	5–0
Marta Makowska (POL)	4	1	0.25	13	10	0–5	5–1	4–5	—	4–5
Cécile Demaude (FRA)	4	1	0.25	11	19	3–5	3–5	0–5	5–4	—

==== Pool B ====
Athlete	B	V	V/B	HS	HD	Germany (GER)	Thailand (THA)	Russia (RUS)	Hungary (HUN)	Belarus (BLR)	Great Britain (GBR)
Simone Briese-Baetke (GER)	5	5	MAX	25	14	—	5–4	5–3	5–2	5–4	5–1
Saysunee Jana (THA)	5	4	0.80	24	13	4–5	—	5–3	5–1	5–3	5–3
Liudmila Vasileva (RUS)	5	3	0.60	21	17	3–5	3–5	—	5–1	5–3	5–3
Gyöngyi Dani (HUN)	5	1	0.20	14	21	2–5	2–5	1–5	—	4–5	5–1
Alesia Makrytskaya (BLR)	5	1	0.20	17	24	4–5	3–5	3–5	5–4	—	2–5
Justine Moore (GBR)	5	1	0.20	10	22	1–5	0–5	3–5	1–5	5–2	—

==== Finals ====
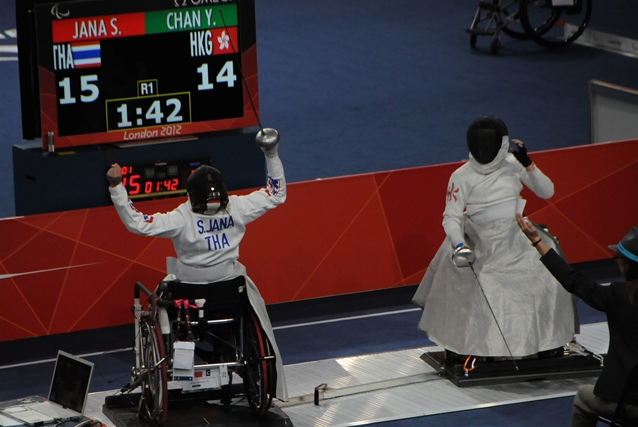
Saysunee Jana (THA) (left) won Chan Yui Chong (HKG)

Quarter-finals
Simone Briese-Baetke (GER)	15
Cécile Demaude (FRA)	4
Liudmila Vasileva (RUS)	5
Tetiana Pozniak (UKR)	1
Chan Yui Chong (HKG)	15
Liudmila Lemiashkevich (BLR)	12
Marta Makowska (POL)	5
Saysunee Jana (THA)	15

Semi-finals
Simone Briese-Baetke (GER)	15
Liudmila Vasileva (RUS)	9
Chan Yui Chong (HKG)	14
Saysunee Jana (THA)	15

Final
Simone Briese-Baetke (GER)	8
Saysunee Jana (THA)	15
Third place match
Liudmila Vasileva (RUS)	13
Chan Yui Chong (HKG)	15
