= Swimming at the 2004 Summer Paralympics – Men's 50 metre breaststroke SB2 =

Men's 50m Breaststroke SB2 at the XII Paralympic Games
- Paralympic Swimming
- Venue: Olympic Aquatic Centre
- Dates: 23 September 2004
- Competitors: 10 from 8 nations
- Winning time: 56.27

Medalists
1st place, gold medalist(s)		Jose Arnulfo Castorena	Mexico
2nd place, silver medalist(s)		Somchai Doungkaew	Thailand
3rd place, bronze medalist(s)		Michael Demarco	United States

The Men's 50 metre breaststroke SB2 swimming event at the 2004 Summer Paralympics was competed on 23 September. It was won by Jose Arnulfo Castorena, representing Mexico.

== 1st round ==
Qualified for final round

Heat 1

23 Sept. 2004, morning session

Rank	Athlete	Time	Notes
1	Somchai Doungkaew (THA)	1:05.61	
2	Cristopher Tronco (MEX)	1:06.26	
3	Genezi Andrade (BRA)	1:11.31	
4	Ioannis Kostakis (GRE)	1:14.53	
5	Oliver Deniz (ESP)	1:24.75	

Heat 2

23 Sept. 2004, morning session

Rank	Athlete	Time	Notes
1	Jose Arnulfo Castorena (MEX)	1:01.41	
2	Michael Demarco (USA)	1:05.29	
3	Andrej Zatko (SVK)	1:06.85	
4	Nenad Krisanovic (SCG)	1:13.60	
5	Georgios Papadimitriou (GRE)	1:24.26	

== Final round ==
23 Sept. 2004, evening session

Rank	Athlete	Time	Notes
1st place, gold medalist(s)	Jose Arnulfo Castorena (MEX)	56.27	WR
2nd place, silver medalist(s)	Somchai Doungkaew (THA)	1:01.17	
3rd place, bronze medalist(s)	Michael Demarco (USA)	1:03.20	
4	Andrej Zatko (SVK)	1:06.38	
5	Cristopher Tronco (MEX)	1:07.55	
6	Genezi Andrade (BRA)	1:10.21	
7	Ioannis Kostakis (GRE)	1:11.42	
8	Nenad Krisanovic (SCG)	1:13.24	
