= Swimming at the 2004 Summer Paralympics – Men's 50 metre butterfly S4 =

Men's 50m Butterfly S4 at the XII Paralympic Games
- Paralympic Swimming
- Venue: Olympic Aquatic Centre
- Dates: 22 September 2004
- Competitors: 10 from 8 nations
- Winning time: 45.12

Medalists
1st place, gold medalist(s)		Clodoaldo Silva	Brazil
2nd place, silver medalist(s)		Somchai Doungkaew	Thailand
3rd place, bronze medalist(s)		Jose Arnulfo Castorena	Mexico

The Men's 50 metre butterfly S4 swimming event at the 2004 Summer Paralympics was competed on 22 September. It was won by Clodoaldo Silva, representing Brazil.

== 1st round ==
Qualified for final round

Heat 1

22 Sept. 2004, morning session

Rank	Athlete	Time	Notes
1	Somchai Doungkaew (THA)	45.75	WR
2	Jose Arnulfo Castorena (MEX)	53.85	
3	Jan Povysil (CZE)	1:07.18	
4	Luca Mazzone (ITA)	1:11.93	
	Joe McCarthy (USA)	DSQ	

Heat 2

22 Sept. 2004, morning session

Rank	Athlete	Time	Notes
1	Clodoaldo Silva (BRA)	47.68	
2	Juan Ignacio Reyes (MEX)	48.29	
3	Zeng Hua Bin (CHN)	55.58	
4	Kestutis Skucas (LTU)	1:02.31	
5	Joon Sok Seo (BRA)	1:02.39	

== Final round ==
22 Sept. 2004, evening session

Rank	Athlete	Time	Notes
1st place, gold medalist(s)	Clodoaldo Silva (BRA)	45.12	WR
2nd place, silver medalist(s)	Somchai Doungkaew (THA)	45.59	
3rd place, bronze medalist(s)	Jose Arnulfo Castorena (MEX)	53.01	
4	Zeng Hua Bin (CHN)	56.80	
5	Kestutis Skucas (LTU)	1:00.45	
6	Joon Sok Seo (BRA)	1:02.31	
7	Jan Povysil (CZE)	1:07.65	
	Juan Ignacio Reyes (MEX)	DSQ	
