= Hamad Aladwani =

Kuwaiti Paralympic athlete

Medal record

Track and field (athletics)

Representing Kuwait

Paralympic Games
Gold medal – first place	2004 Athens	400 metres – T53
Silver medal – second place	2004 Athens	100 metres – T53
Silver medal – second place	2004 Athens	200 metres – T53
Bronze medal – third place	2000 Sydney	100 metres – T53

Hamad Aladwani is a paralympic athlete from Kuwait competing mainly in category T53 sprint events.

Hamad competed in the 2000 Summer Paralympics winning bronze in the 100m but missing out on medals in the 200m and 400m. 2004 proved to be his best year when winning gold in the 400m and silver in both the 100m and 200m. He was unable to follow this up in 2008 and missed out on medals in all three sprints.
