= Archery at the 2004 Summer Paralympics – Women's individual standing =

Women's Individual standing at the XII Paralympic Games
- Paralympic Archery
- Venue: Olympic Baseball Centre (Athens)
- Dates: 21–25 September
- Competitors: 16 from 11 nations

Medalists
1st place, gold medalist(s)		Wang Yanhong	China
2nd place, silver medalist(s)		Wasana Karpmaichan	Thailand
3rd place, bronze medalist(s)		Malgorzata Olejnik	Poland

The Women's Individual standing archery competition at the 2004 Summer Paralympics was held from 21 to 25 September at the Olympic Baseball Centre (Athens).

The event was won by Wang Yanhong, representing China.

== Results ==
=== Ranking Round ===
Rank	Competitor	Points	Notes
1	Lindsey Carmichael (USA)	603	WR
2	Wang Yanhong (CHN)	603	WR
3	Malgorzata Olejnik (POL)	583	
4	Lee Hwa Sook (KOR)	577	
5	Anita Chapman (GBR)	554	
6	Lee Kyung Hee (KOR)	552	
7	Anna Tzika (GRE)	549	
8	Bohdana Nikitenko (UKR)	546	
9	Ratchanee Panmai (THA)	530	
10	Wieslawa Wolak (POL)	527	
11	Masako Yonezawa (JPN)	522	
12	Wasana Karpmaichan (THA)	521	
13	Olena Struk (UKR)	516	
14	Alicja Bukanska (POL)	515	
15	Natalie Cordowiner (AUS)	505	
16	Tatsiana Hryshko (BLR)	497	

=== Competition bracket ===
First round
Lindsey Carmichael (USA)	145
Tatsiana Hryshko (BLR)	113
Ratchanee Panmai (THA)	135
Bohdana Nikitenko (UKR)	116
Anita Chapman (GBR)	108
Wasana Karpmaichan (THA)	132
Olena Struk (UKR)	127
Lee Hwa Sook (KOR)	136
Malgorzata Olejnik (POL)	140
Alicja Bukanska (POL)	121
Masako Yonezawa (JPN)	134
Lee Kyung Hee (KOR)	126
Anna Tzika (GRE)	130
Wieslawa Wolak (POL)	128
Natalie Cordowiner (AUS)	126
Wang Yanhong (CHN)	136

Second round
Lindsey Carmichael (USA)	91
Ratchanee Panmai (THA)	98
Wasana Karpmaichan (THA)	88
Lee Hwa Sook (KOR)	78
Malgorzata Olejnik (POL)	99
Masako Yonezawa (JPN)	95
Anna Tzika (GRE)	91
Wang Yanhong (CHN)	101

Semifinals
Ratchanee Panmai (THA)	75
Wasana Karpmaichan (THA)	87
Malgorzata Olejnik (POL)	80
Wang Yanhong (CHN)	98

Finals
Wasana Karpmaichan (THA)	83
Wang Yanhong (CHN)	92
Third place
Ratchanee Panmai (THA)	77
Malgorzata Olejnik (POL)	93
