= Yoo Won-jeong =

South Korean paralympic boccia player

Sport
- Country: South Korea
- Sport: Boccia
Medal record
Representing South Korea
Paralympic Games
Boccia
| Bronze medal – third place | 2016 Rio de Janeiro | Individual BC1 |

Yoo Won-jeong is a South Korean paralympic boccia player. He participated at the 2016 Summer Paralympics in the boccia competition, being awarded the bronze medal in the individual BC1 event.
