= Natalie Cordowiner =

Australian Paralympic archer

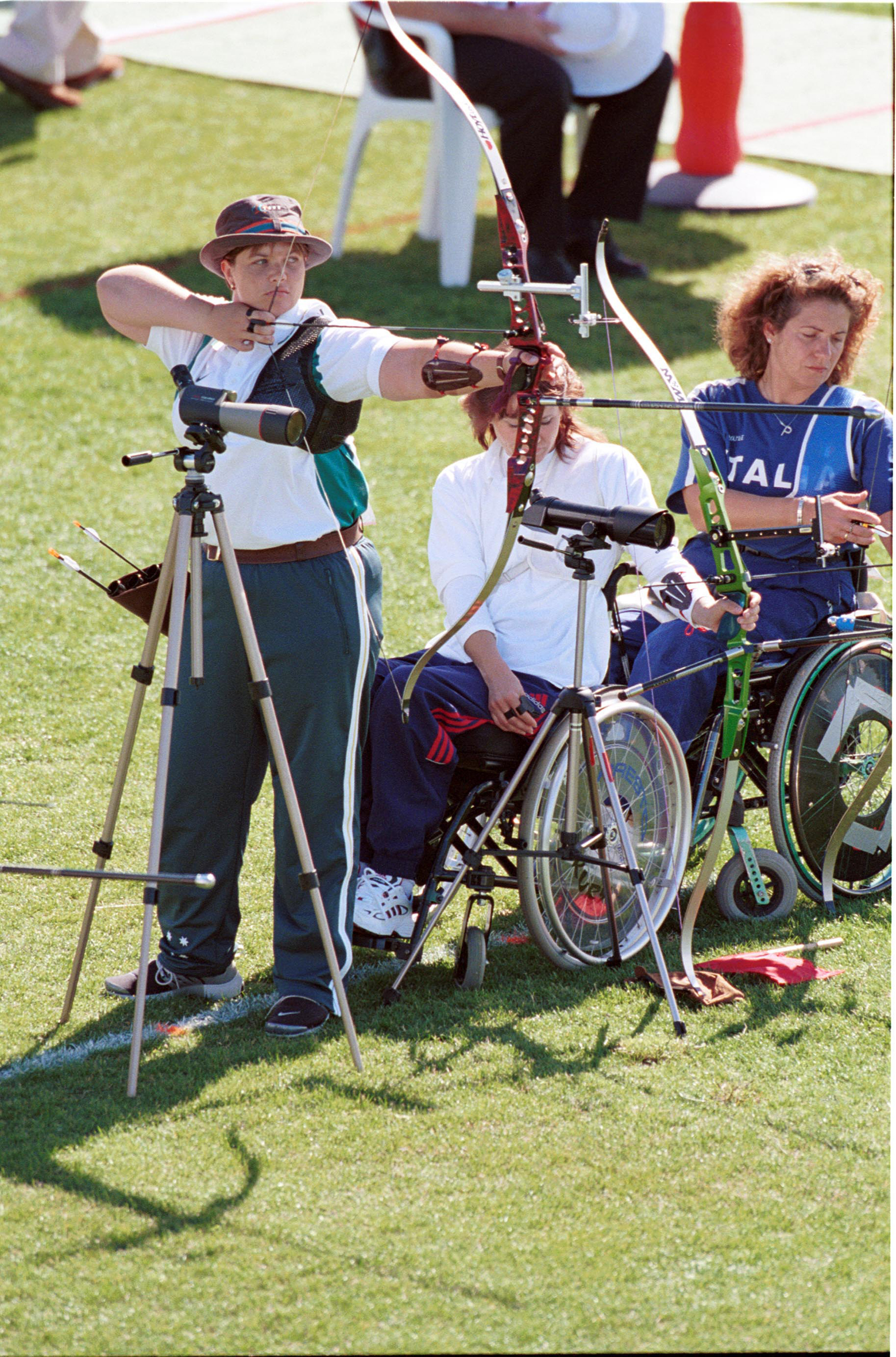
- Cordowiner (standing) at 2000 Summer Paralympics

Personal information
- Born: 1972 (age 53–54) Newcastle, New South Wales, Australia

Sport
- Sport: Para archery
Medal record
Representing Australia
World Championships
Silver medal – second place	2003 Madrid	Women's individual recurve

Natalie Cordowiner (born 1972) is an Australian former Paralympic archer who competed in international archery competitions. She was the first Australian para archer to win a medal at the World Championships, she also competed at the 2000 and 2004 Summer Paralympics.

Cordowiner was born with a right leg malformation and osteoarthritis in her right leg which reduces her mobility, she uses a crutch. She works as a general practitioner.
