= Boccia at the 2004 Summer Paralympics – Individual BC1 =

Boccia - Mixed Individual BC1 at the XII Paralympic Games
- Paralympic Boccia
- Venue: Ano Liosia Olympic Hall
- Dates: 23–26 September 2004
- Competitors: 23 from 13 nations

Medalists
1st place, gold medalist(s)		Joao Paulo Fernandez	Portugal
2nd place, silver medalist(s)		Roger Aandalen	Norway
3rd place, bronze medalist(s)		Pattaya Padtong	Thailand

The mixed individual BC1 boccia competition at the 2004 Summer Paralympics was held from 23 to 26 September at the Ano Liosia Olympic Hall.

The event was won by Joao Paulo Fernandez, representing Portugal.

== Results ==
=== Preliminaries ===
==== Pool A ====
Rank	Competitor	MP	W	L	Points	DEN	AUT	ARG	USA	CAN
1	Henrik Jorgensen (DEN)	4	4	0	47:0	x	7:0	10:0	14:0	16:0
2	Harald Grossmayer (AUT)	4	3	1	24:12	0:7	x	11:3	8:0	5:2
3	Mauricio Ibarburen (ARG)	4	2	2	15:29	0:10	3:11	x	5:3	7:5
4	Timothy Hawker (USA)	4	1	3	7:28	0:14	0:8	3:5	x	4:1
5	Mirane Lanoix-Boyer (CAN)	4	0	4	8:32	0:16	2:5	5:7	1:4	x

==== Pool B ====
Rank	Competitor	MP	W	L	Points	NZL	POR	AUT	GBR	CAN	ESP
1	Liam Sanders (NZL)	4	4	0	28:11	x	3:2	13:4	6:3	6:2	W/O
2	Joao Paulo Fernandez (POR)	5	4	1	28:12	2:3	x	4:0	6:5	9:2	7:2
3	Eva Maria Prossegger (AUT)	4	2	2	14:20	4:13	0:4	x	3:2	7:1	W/O
4	Susie Robinson (GBR)	5	1	4	21:22	3:6	5:6	2:3	x	5:7	6:0
5	David Vanhoek (CAN)	4	1	3	12:27	2:6	2:9	1:7	7:5	x	W/O
6	Antonio Cid (ESP)	2	0	2	2:13	DNF	2:7	DNS	0:6	DNS	x

==== Pool C ====
Rank	Competitor	MP	W	L	Points	ESP	THA	IRL	GBR	ARG	AUT
1	Francisco Beltran (ESP)	5	5	0	34:17	x	6:4	9:3	5:3	9:3	5:4
2	Chaiyaporn Taksee (THA)	5	3	2	30:19	4:6	x	9:2	7:1	4:7	6:3
3	Gabriel Shelly (IRL)	5	3	2	29:22	3:9	2:9	x	7:3	11:0	6:1
4	Peter Pearse (GBR)	5	2	3	25:21	3:5	1:7	3:7	x	7:2	11:0
5	Gabriela Villano (ARG)	5	2	3	17:32	3:9	7:4	0:11	2:7	x	5:1
6	Gerhard Gahleitner (AUT)	5	0	5	9:33	4:5	3:6	1:6	0:11	1:5	x

==== Pool D ====
Rank	Competitor	MP	W	L	Points	THA	NOR	DEN	HKG	POR	NOR
1	Pattaya Padtong (THA)	5	4	1	30:13	x	3:2	6:5	5:2	2:4	14:0
2	Roger Aandalen (NOR)	5	4	1	26:19	2:3	x	6:5	5:4	5:3	8:4
3	Lone Bak-Pedersen (DEN)	5	3	2	29:17	5:6	5:6	x	4:3	6:0	9:2
4	Leung Mei Yee (HKG)	5	2	3	22:16	2:5	4:5	3:4	x	7:1	6:1
5	Antonio Marques (POR)	5	2	3	19:20	4:2	3:5	0:6	1:7	x	11:0
6	Elisabeth Wilhelmsen (NOR)	5	0	5	7:48	0:14	4:8	2:9	1:6	0:11	x

=== Competition bracket ===
Quarterfinals
Henrik Jorgensen (DEN)	1
Joao Paulo Fernandez (POR)	6
Pattaya Padtong (THA)	6
Chaiyaporn Taksee (THA)	0
Liam Sanders (NZL)	4
Harald Grossmayer (AUT)	5
Francisco Beltran (ESP)	2
Roger Aandalen (NOR)	3

Semifinals
Joao Paulo Fernandez (POR)	5
Pattaya Padtong (THA)	1
Harald Grossmayer (AUT)	3
Roger Aandalen (NOR)	4

Finals
Joao Paulo Fernandez (POR)	4
Roger Aandalen (NOR)	2
Third place
Pattaya Padtong (THA)	4
Harald Grossmayer (AUT)	3
