= Barry Patriquin =

Canadian Paralympic athlete

Medal record

Paralympic athletics

Representing Canada

Paralympic Games
Bronze medal – third place	2000 Sydney	4x100 metre relay - T54

Barry Patriquin (born 1962 in Oxford, Nova Scotia) is a paralympic athlete from Canada competing mainly in category T53 sprint events.

Barry twice competed in the Paralympics, firstly in 2000 where he competed in the 100m and won a bronze medal as part of the Canadian 4 × 100 m relay team in the class T54 relay. He then moved up to 400m in the 2004 Summer Paralympics where he finished outside the medals.
