= Justine Moore =

British wheelchair fencer

- Born: 28 November 1992; Blackpool, Lancashire, England
- Known for: Great Britain Paralympian wheelchair fencer

Justine Moore is a British Paralympic wheelchair fencer.

== Life ==
Moore was born in about 1992 and she damaged her spine from a fall from a tree. In 2009 she took up fencing. In 2012 she did wheelchair fencing in Hong Kong. She was at the 2012 Summer Paralympics. In the team event she came sixth with teammates Gabi Down and Gemma Collis-McCann. She was beaten by the Hungarian Gyongyi Dani in the women's individual Épée Category B. The match was at the Excel Arena in London. She obtained sponsorship to be at the postponed 2020 Paralympics in Tokyo.
