= Sakul Kumtan =

Thai Paralympic athlete

Personal information
- Native name: สกุล คำตัน
- Nationality: Thailand

Sport
- Sport: Para-athletics, Para table tennis
- Disability class: A3/A9; TT2
- Events: Javelin throw, shot put, discus throw

Achievements and titles
- Paralympic finals: 1988; 1992
Medal record
Men's para-athletics
Representing Thailand
Paralympic Games
Silver medal – second place	1988 Seoul	Javelin A3/A9

Sakul Kumtan (Thai: สกุล คำตัน) is a Thai former para-athletics competitor. He won a silver medal in the men's javelin throw A3/A9 event at the 1988 Summer Paralympics in Seoul, South Korea. The medal was Thailand's first medal at the Paralympic Games.

== Career ==
Kumtan represented Thailand at the 1988 Summer Paralympics. In the men's javelin throw A3/A9, he finished second with a throw of 33.52 metres, behind Hubert Burschgens of West Germany, winning the silver medal. It was Thailand's first medal at the Paralympic Games. He also competed in the men's shot put A3/A9, finishing seventh with a throw of 6.55 metres, and the men's discus throw A3/A9, finishing seventh with a throw of 20.18 metres.

Kumtan also competed in table tennis at the 1988 Summer Paralympics, taking part in the men's singles TT2 event.

He later competed at the 1992 Summer Paralympics in Barcelona, finishing ninth in the men's javelin THS2 event with a throw of 34.82 metres.

== Paralympic results ==
Games	Event	Result	Performance
1988 Seoul	Men's javelin throw A3/A9	2nd place, silver medalist(s)	33.52 m
1988 Seoul	Men's shot put A3/A9	7th	6.55 m
1988 Seoul	Men's discus throw A3/A9	7th	20.18 m
1992 Barcelona	Men's javelin THS2	9th	34.82 m
