= Dan Bentley =

British Paralympic boccia player (born 1984)

Personal information
- Nationality: British
- Born: 15 August 1984 (age 41) Chelmsford, England
Medal record
Representing Great Britain
Paralympic Games
Boccia
Gold medal – first place	2008 Beijing	Team BC1-2
Bronze medal – third place	2012 London	Team BC1–2

Daniel James Bentley (born 15 August 1984 in Chelmsford) is a Paralympic boccia player with cerebral palsy. At the 2008 Beijing Paralympics he was part of the first British team to win gold at boccia at the Paralympics, in the Team BC1-2 category. He competed again as part of the team for Great Britain at the 2012 London Paralympics, taking bronze in the Team BC1–2 event.
