= Saifon Kaewsri =

Thai Paralympic swimmer

Sport
- Country: Thailand
- Sport: Paralympic swimming
- Disability class: S4
Medal record
Paralympic swimming
Representing Thailand
Paralympic Games
Bronze medal – third place	2000 Sydney	50m breaststroke SB2

Saifon Kaewsri is a Thai Paralympic swimmer. He won the bronze medal in the men's 50 metre breaststroke SB2 event at the 2000 Summer Paralympics held in Sydney, Australia.
