= Witsanu Huadpradit =

Thai boccia player (born 1983)

Personal information
- Born: 11 November 1983 (age 42) Nakhon Nayok, Thailand

Sport
- Sport: Boccia
- Disability class: BC1
Medal record
Paralympic Games
Gold medal – first place	2012 London	Team BC1–2
Gold medal – first place	2020 Tokyo	Team BC1–2
Asian Para Games
Gold medal – first place	2018 Jakarta	Team BC1–2
Gold medal – first place	2018 Jakarta	Individual BC1
Gold medal – first place	2022 Hangzhou	Individual BC1

Witsanu Huadpradit (Thai: วิษณุ ฮวดประดิษฐ์; born 11 November 1983) is a Thai boccia player who represented Thailand at the 2012 and 2020 Summer Paralympics. At the 2012 Paralympics games in London, he won a gold medal in Boccia in the mixed team BC1–2 event.
