= José Manuel Prado =

Spanish boccia player (born 1975)

Personal information
- Full name: José Manuel Prado Prado
- Nationality: Spanish
- Born: 7 October 1975 (age 50) Mexico

Sport
- Country: Spain
- Sport: Boccia

José Manuel Prado Prado (born 7 October 1975) is a Spanish boccia player, who has represented the country internationally at the Paralympic Games.

== Personal ==
Prado is from Orense.

== Boccia ==
Prado is a BC1 classified boccia player, and is a member of the A.D. Aixiña club.

National Institute of Physical Education Lleida hosted the 2008 Spanish national championships. Prado competed in this event. Elche, Spain hosted the Spanish Boccia Club Championship in June 2011, with Prado participating in the event. He finished second in the team event competing for Ainina Ourense, Galicia.

The Boccia World Championships were held in August 2011, and Prado participated. The event was part of the ranking process to qualify for the London Paralympic Games. He was eliminated in the group stage after having 1 win and 2 losses. In January 2012, he participated in a boccia training camp organized by the Spanish Cerebral Palsy Federation of Sports (FEDPC) and the Spanish Sports Federation for Persons with Physical Disabilities (FEDDF) along with 24 other boccia players from around Spain held at CRE San Andrés. The camp was part of national team preparations for the London Paralympics. Club ADM and the Sociocultural Disability Association (ASCM) organized the June 2012 Spanish national championships which he competed in. He finished first in the competition in the BC1 group. He competed at the 2012 Summer Paralympics, losing 4–5 in the round of sixteen.

In October 2013, Prado was ranked the sixth best Spanish competitor in his classification.
