= Ampai Sualuang =

Thai Paralympic athlete

Personal information
- Born: 8 February 1973 (age 53)

Sport
- Sport: Paralympic athletics
Medal record
Paralympic athletics
Representing Thailand
Paralympic Games
Gold medal – first place	2000 Sydney	4×100 metre relay T54
Silver medal – second place	2000 Sydney	4×400 metre relay T54
World Para Athletics Championships
Gold medal – first place	2002 Lille	4x100m relay T53-54
Gold medal – first place	2002 Lille	4x400m relay T53-54
Asian Para Games
Silver medal – second place	2010 Guangzhou	5000m T54
Bronze medal – third place	2010 Guangzhou	800m T54

Ampai Sualuang (Thai: อำไพ เสือเหลือง, RTGS: Amphai Suealueang; born 8 February 1973) is a paralympic athlete from Thailand competing mainly in category T54 sprint events.

== Biography ==
Ampai has competed in four Paralympics winning two medals. He competed in the 2000 Summer Paralympics and was part of the Thai 4 × 100 m relay team won a gold medal and won another silver medal as part of the 4 × 100 m relay team.
