= Pattaya Tadtong =

Thai Paralympic boccia player

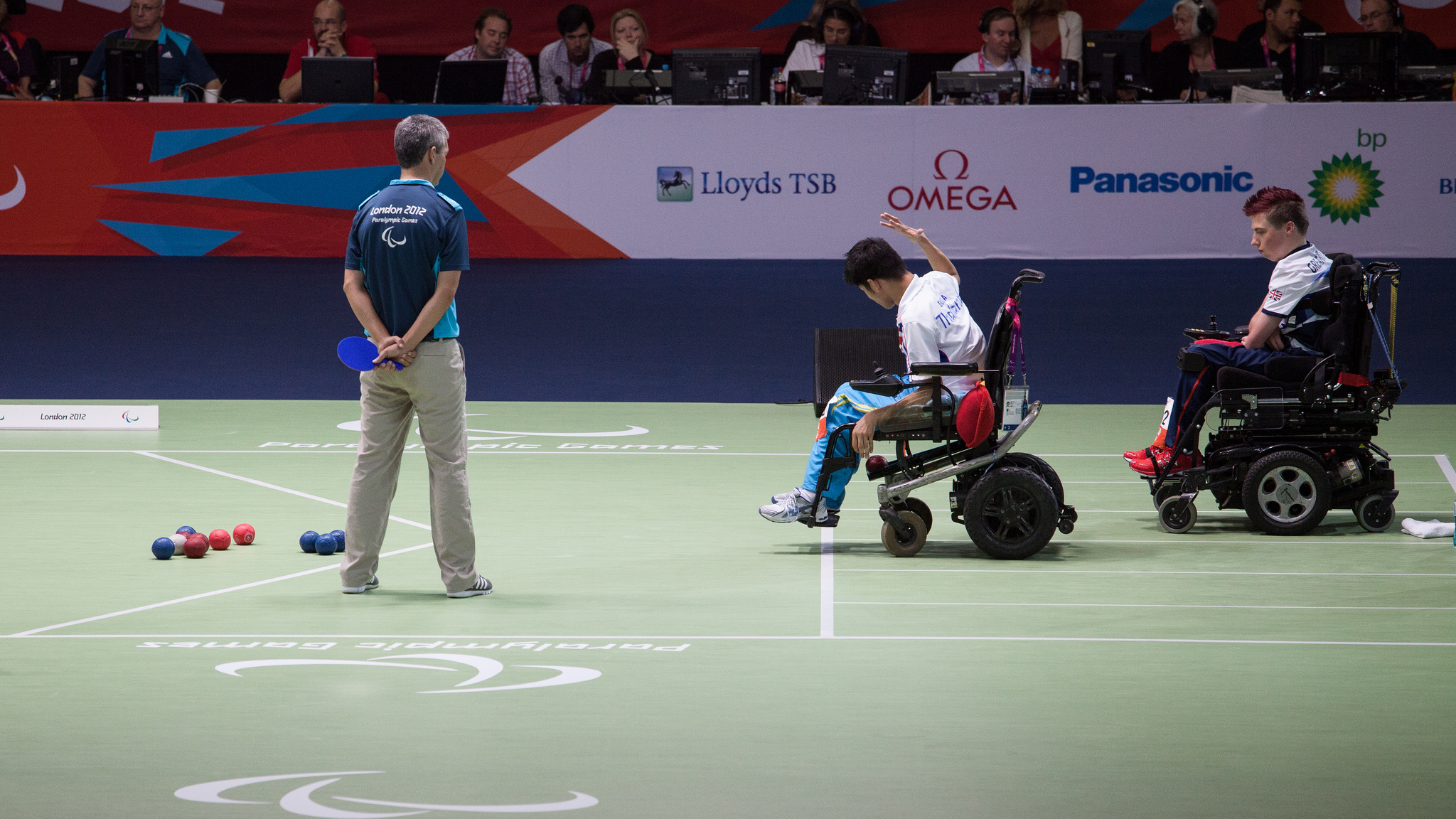
- London 2012 - Pattaya Tadtong and David Smith

Personal information
- Born: 10 May 1979 (age 47)

Sport
- Sport: Boccia
- Disability class: BC1
Medal record
Boccia
Representing Thailand
Event / 1st / 2nd / 3rd; Paralympic Games / 3 / 0 / 1
Paralympic Games
Gold medal – first place	2012 London	Individual BC1
Gold medal – first place	2012 London	Team BC1–2
Gold medal – first place	2016 Rio de Janeiro	Team BC1–2
Bronze medal – third place	2004 Athens	Individual BC1
Asian Para Games
Gold medal – first place	2014 Incheon	Individual BC1
Gold medal – first place	2014 Incheon	Team BC1-2

Pattaya Tadtong (Thai: พัทธยา เทศทอง; born 10 May 1979) is a Thai boccia player. He won a bronze medal at the 2004 Summer Paralympics. At the 2012 Summer Paralympics he won gold in the mixed individual BC1 and was on the gold medal-winning Thai team in the mixed team BC1-2. He, along with his 3 teammates, won a gold medal in Boccia in the Mixed Team BC1–2 event.
