= Supachai Koysub =

Thai paralympic athlete (born 1977)

Personal information
- Born: 15 July 1977 (age 48)

Sport
- Sport: Track and field
- Disability class: T54
Medal record
Men's para-athletics
Representing Thailand
Paralympic Games
Gold medal – first place	2000 Sydney	200m – T54
Gold medal – first place	2000 Sydney	4 × 100 m – T54
Gold medal – first place	2004 Athens	4 × 100 m – T53–54
Gold medal – first place	2004 Athens	4 × 400 m – T53–54
Silver medal – second place	2000 Sydney	4 × 400 m – T54
Silver medal – second place	2008 Beijing	4 × 100 m – T53–54
Silver medal – second place	2008 Beijing	4 × 400 m – T53–54
Silver medal – second place	2012 London	4 × 400 m – T53/54
Bronze medal – third place	2008 Beijing	100m – T54
Asian Para Games
Gold medal – first place	2010 Guangzhou	100m T54
Gold medal – first place	2010 Guangzhou	200m T54
Silver medal – second place	2010 Guangzhou	4 × 100 m relay T53–54

Supachai Koysub (born 15 July 1977) is an athlete and Paralympian from Thailand competing mainly in category T54 sprint events.

== Biography ==
He competed in the 2000 Summer Paralympics in Sydney, Australia. There he won a gold medal in the men's 200 metres – T54 event, a gold medal in the men's 4 × 100 metre relay – T54 event, a silver medal in the men's 4 × 400 metre relay – T54 event, finished fourth in the men's 100 metres – T54 event and went out in the semi-finals of the men's 800 metres – T54 event. He also competed at the 2004 Summer Paralympics in Athens, Greece. There he won a gold medal in the men's 4 × 100 metre relay – T53–54 event, a gold medal in the men's 4 × 400 metre relay – T53–54 event, was disqualified in the men's 100 metres – T54 event, finished fourth in the men's 200 metres – T54 event and finished seventh in the men's 400 metres – T54 event. He also competed at the 2008 Summer Paralympics in Beijing, China. There he won a silver medal in the men's 4 × 100 metre relay – T53–54 event, a silver medal in the men's 4 × 400 metre relay – T53–54 event, a bronze medal in the men's 100 metres – T54 event, went out in the first round of the men's 200 metres – T54 event and finished sixth in the men's 400 metres – T54 event
