= Sopa Intasen =

Thai Paralympic athlete

Personal information
- Born: 25 March 1982 (age 44)

Sport
- Sport: Paralympic athletics
Medal record
Paralympic athletics
Representing Thailand
Paralympic Games
Gold medal – first place	2000 Sydney	4×100 metre relay T54
Silver medal – second place	2000 Sydney	100 metres T53
Silver medal – second place	2000 Sydney	4×400 metre relay T54
Silver medal – second place	2012 London	4×400 metre relay T53/54
World Para Athletics Championships
Gold medal – first place	2002 Lille	4x100m relay T53-54
Gold medal – first place	2002 Lille	4x400m relay T53-54
Bronze medal – third place	2002 Lille	100m T53
Bronze medal – third place	2002 Lille	200m T53
Asian Para Games
Gold medal – first place	2010 Guangzhou	100m T53
Silver medal – second place	2014 Incheon	4x400m relay T53-54
Bronze medal – third place	2010 Guangzhou	200m T53

Sopa Intasen (born 25 March 1982) is a paralympic athlete from Thailand competing mainly in category T53 sprint events.

== Biography ==
Sopa has competed in four Paralympics winning four medals. He competed in the 2000 Summer Paralympics in the 200m and 400m as well as winning a silver medal in the 100m and as part of the Thai 4 × 400 m relay team won a second silver and won a gold medal as part of the 4 × 400 m relay team. His future Paralympics proved unsuccessful in that in the next two games he was unable to win any further medals despite competing in a total of seven events.
