= David Smith (boccia) =

British boccia player (born 1989)

David Smith OBE
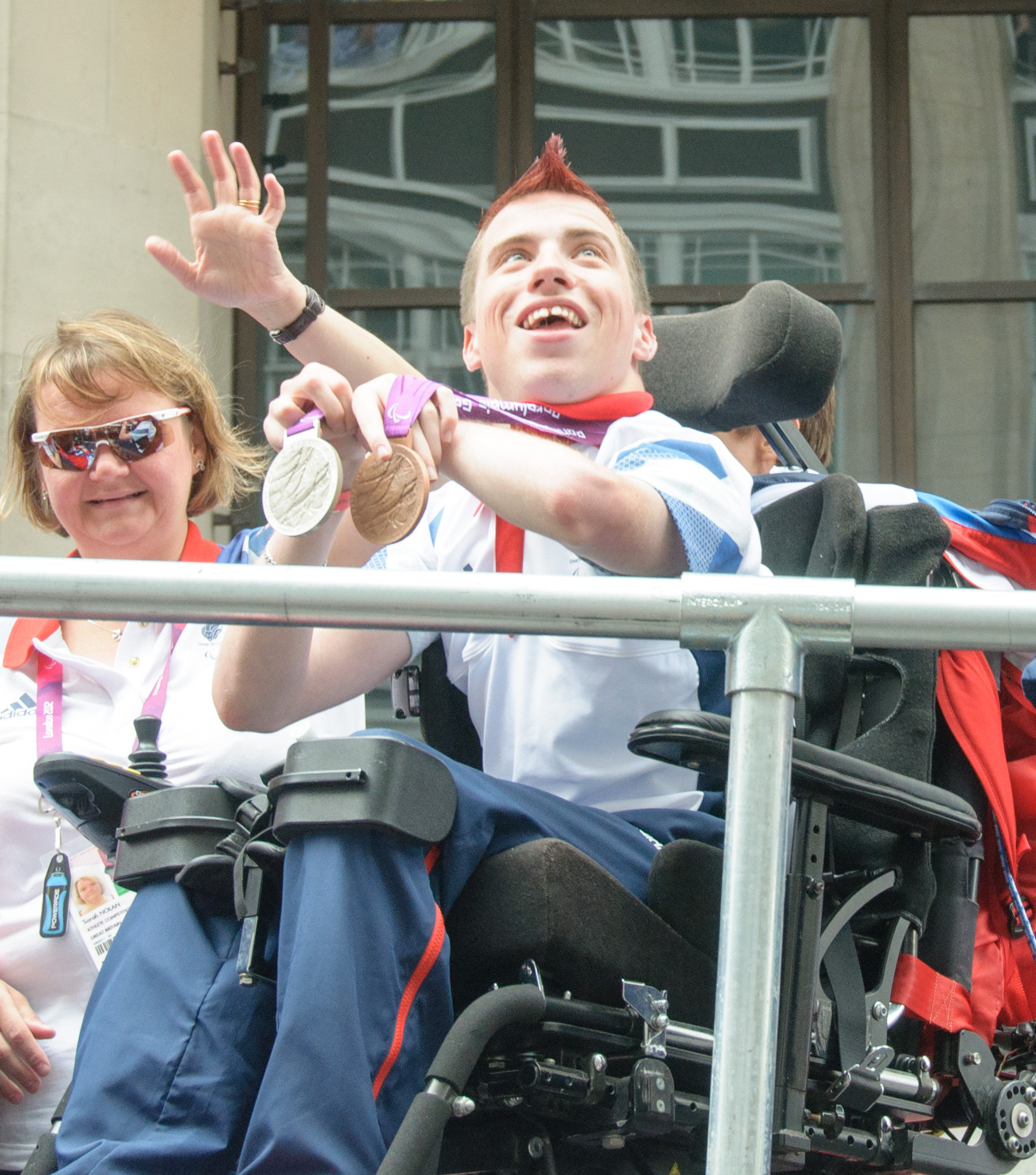
- Smith at heroes' parade in London

Personal information
- Full name: David John Smith
- Born: 2 March 1989 (age 37) Eastleigh, Hampshire, England

Sport
- Country: United Kingdom
- Sport: Boccia
- Disability class: BC1 Male
- Club: Swansea Boccia Club
Medal record
Boccia
Representing Great Britain
Paralympic Games
Gold medal – first place	2008 Beijing	Team BC1-2
Gold medal – first place	2016 Rio	Individual BC1
Gold medal – first place	2020 Tokyo	Individual BC1
Silver medal – second place	2012 London	Individual BC1
Bronze medal – third place	2012 London	Team BC1-2
World Championships
Gold medal – first place	2007 Vancouver	Individual BC1
Gold medal – first place	2007 Vancouver	Team BC1-2
Gold medal – first place	2014 Beijing	Individual BC1
Gold medal – first place	2018 Liverpool	Individual BC1
Silver medal – second place	2022 Rio	Individual BC1 Male
Silver medal – second place	2022 Rio	Team BC1-2
Bronze medal – third place	2006 Rio	Team BC1-2
Bronze medal – third place	2011 Belfast	Team BC1-2
Bronze medal – third place	2014 Beijing	Team BC1-2
Bronze medal – third place	2016 Beijing	Individual BC1
European Championships
Gold medal – first place	2009 Porto	Individual BC1
Gold medal – first place	2013 Porto	Individual BC1
Gold medal – first place	2013 Porto	Team BC1-2
Gold medal – first place	2015 Guildford	Team BC1-2
Gold medal – first place	2017 Porto	Individual BC1
Gold medal – first place	2019 Porto	Individual BC1
Gold medal – first place	2021 Seville	Individual BC1 Male
Silver medal – second place	2005 Porto	Team BC1-2
Silver medal – second place	2009 Porto	Team BC1-2
Silver medal – second place	2023 Rotterdam	Individual BC1 Male
Silver medal – second place	2023 Rotterdam	Team BC1-2
Bronze medal – third place	2019 Porto	Team BC1-2

David John Smith (born 2 March 1989) is a British Paralympic athlete in the sport of boccia. Smith is the most successful British boccia athlete with 5 Paralympic medals, including 3 gold medals.

Smith made his Paralympic debut in the British boccia team which won the gold medal at the 2008 Summer Paralympics. He competed for Great Britain at the 2012 Summer Paralympics, winning Bronze in the Team BC1–2 and Silver in the BC1 individual event. Smith competed for the British Paralympic Association at the 2016 Summer Paralympics in Rio de Janeiro, winning Gold in the individual BC1 event for the first time. Smith became only the second BC1 to defend his title at the 2020 Summer Paralympics in Tokyo. He was selected to carry his country's flag in the 2020 Summer Paralympics closing ceremony. Smith held the 'triple crown' of major tournament wins, following his win at the World Championships in Liverpool 2018 until the World Championships in Rio 2022 where he claimed Silver. At the 2024 Summer Paralympics in Paris, Smith narrowly missed out on adding to his tally, finishing 4th individually and 5th in the mix team.

== Early life ==
Smith was born on 2 March 1989 in Eastleigh near Southampton, Hampshire.

== Education ==
=== School ===
Smith was diagnosed with cerebral palsy at age one and went to a developmental centre in Winchester for disabled children. He went to Cedar School, Southampton for special needs children at age three. Smith first played boccia at age six at Cedar School when the school competed at the national junior games in Stoke Mandeville.

At age eleven, Smith enrolled in Treloar School near Alton, Hampshire, where he developed his skills in boccia, drumming, wheelchair hockey, wheelchair football and para-athletics. He became the youngest player to win the British Boccia Championships at the age of fourteen. Smith was elected head boy in 2004 and managed the wheelchair hockey and football sessions.

At the age of 16, Smith attended Alton College (part of Treloar) to complete his A-levels in physics and maths.

=== University ===
After the Beijing Paralympics in 2008, Smith went to Swansea University to study aerospace engineering. Due to his boccia training, he finished his degree in six years. Smith had a permanent base in Swansea with the sports support services and facilities necessary to remain successful.

== International boccia ==
=== Early career ===
Smith joined the England and Wales squad in 2004, soon after his first British title. His international debut followed the same year. He attended the European Championships in 2005, his first major ranking international. He beat the world-ranked number 6 player 6–0 in a pool game and went to the quarter-finals. In the team event, he helped England secure a silver medal. He had a disappointing second major in 2006, representing Great Britain, where he finished 13th and the team received a bronze at the World Championships in Rio.

In 2007, he became a double world champion at the age of 18. Smith competed in Beijing in 2008 but only managed 13th individually. His team did much better, achieving a Paralympic Gold.

=== Mid-career ===
After the Beijing World Championships, Sarah Nolan became Smith's coach in 2010. In 2009, Smith won his first European Championships to become a world-ranked number 1 for the first time. In 2010, Smith and his team lost in the quarter-finals to Tadtong of Thailand at the World Championships. Nolan started reworking how Smith played the game to suit the new style of play from Asia. In 2011, Nolan became Smith's permanent on-court assistant.

In 2012, Smith won two medals at the Paralympics for the first time. Claire Morrison became Smith's coach while Nolan remained his on-court assistant in 2013. Smith took over as team captain and won double gold at the European Championships of that year.

In 2014, Smith became world champion for a second time, winning the final with 8–2. In 2015, Smith captained the team to another European gold, and the team gained an automatic slot for the Rio Paralympics. In 2016, Smith claimed bronze at the World Individual Championships in Beijing, having lost once in the pool stages and losing again to Tadtong.

In the Rio Paralympics, Smith recovered from the disappointment of team failure and the loss of a must-win pool game to beat his long-term Thailand rival for the first time. After 8 years, Smith became an Individual Paralympic champion.

=== Later career ===
Glynn Tromans took over coaching after the Rio Paralympics, and Smith won the European Championships for the third time, remaining undefeated during the whole 2017 season. In 2018, Smith reclaimed his world title at the World Championships in Liverpool, completing the "Triple Crown" by being the reigning Paralympic, European and World champion.

In 2019, Smith defended his European title, automatically qualifying for Tokyo in the process.

=== Restart ===
After the COVID-19 pandemic postponed all competitions for a year, Smith's first competitive competition was the Paralympics in Tokyo. After suffering atechnical issues in the pool, Smith found his top form for the quarters, semis and final matches. Smith played live on C4 for the first time in front of millions of people to win the Gold and defend his title. At the end of the year, Smith won his 7th European title in Seville, Spain.

At the 2023 World Championships, Smith won a silver in both the team and individual events. He came 4th in the individual Boccia and 5th in the Mixed team, alongside Claire Taggart and Kayleigh Haggo in the 2024 Summer Paralympics.

=== Domestic boccia ===
Smith has remained unbeaten at the annual English Nationals and GB Championships since 2004, clocking up a record of 20 British and 11 National titles. In 2016, Smith retired from the English Nationals to focus on his international career.

== Personal life ==
Smith lives and trains full-time in Swansea. He has a passion for aircraft, particularly World War II aircraft. He is a strong advocate of independent living for disabled people and a critic of successive government cuts to spending on social care. Smith can drive independently using his car, which is heavily adapted.

Smith is an ambassador for the Saints Disabled Supporters' Association, Ottobock, Treloar Trust and Sirus Automotive. He regularly volunteers at the Swansea Bay parkrun. Smith was selected to go on Dreamflight in 2003 and since then has been a regular supporter and visitor. Smith also works as a Herbalife coach and distributor, is a keen driver and an advocate of the Motability scheme.

== Television appearances ==
Smith has made two appearances on The Last Leg, where he has performed his trademark "doughnut" in his wheelchair.

== Honours and awards ==
Smith was given the Freedom of the Borough of Eastleigh in 2013. He was appointed Member of the Order of the British Empire (MBE) in the 2017 New Year Honours and Officer of the Order of the British Empire (OBE) in the 2022 New Year Honours, both for services to boccia.
