= Paralympic Committee of Thailand =

National Paralympic Committee of Thailand

National Paralympic Committee
- Country: Thailand
- Code: THA
- Created: 11 June 1985; 41 years ago
- Recognized: 1985
- Continental association: APC
- Headquarters: Bangkok, Thailand
- President: Lt.Naiyanobh Bhirombhakdi
- Secretary General: Maj.Gen. Osot Pawilai
- Website: www.paralympicthai.com

The Paralympic Committee of Thailand (PCT, Thai: คณะกรรมการพาราลิมปิกแห่งประเทศไทย) is the national Paralympic committee in Thailand for the Paralympic Games movement, based in Bangkok, Thailand. It is a non-profit organisation that selects teams and raises funds to send Thailand competitors to Paralympic events organised by the International Paralympic Committee (IPC), Asian Para Games events organised by the Asian Paralympic Committee (APC) and ASEAN Para Games events organised by the ASEAN Para Sports Federation (APSF).

The council was established on June 11, 1985, and is recognized by International Paralympic Committee (IPC) and Asian Paralympic Committee (APC). The association is headquartered in Pathum Wan, Bangkok. The current head of the federation is Gen. Prawit Wongsuwan.

== Governance ==
=== Executive Board ===
Designation	Name
President	Mr. Chutinant Bhirombhakdi
Vice Presidents	Gen. Vipas Tansutuch
Vice Presidents	Mr. Wanchai Surakul
Secretary General	Col. Osot Pawilai
Vice Secretary General	Mr. Wisit Youngpradit
Vice Secretary General	Col. Aumpan Thaitae
Vice Secretary General	Mr. Kittipong Potimu
Consultants	Dr. Nat Indrapana
Consultants	Dr. Sasitara Pichaichannarong
Consultants	Gen. Choosilp Khunathai
Consultants	Mr. Kanokphan Chulakrasaem
Consultants	Mr. Sombat Kuruphan
Treasurer	Mr. Manoch Machayimawan

Designation	Name
Members	Mr. Pitak Polkhun
Members	Mr. Aumnuay Klinyoo
Members	Mr. Chanwit Munikanont
Members	Mr. Noppadol Chiraboondilok
Members	Mr. Surasit Thongchan
Members	Mr. Auttharit Saringkapaibool
Members	Mr. Rawin Chompunuchthanin
Members	Mr. Boonlerch Khanapornworakan
Members	Mr. Sombat Pitakpong
Members	Mr. Surachart Chaesurapab
Members	Ms. Siriwan Chirapotirat
Members	Mr. Col. Pusit Feungfu

== National governing body members ==
=== Sports Association for the Disabled of Thailand ===
Sports Association for the Disabled of Thailand a division of the Paralympic Committee of Thailand
- Sport: Disabled sports
- Jurisdiction: National
- Abbreviation: SADT
- Founded: 11 June 1985; 41 years ago
- Headquarters: Pathum Wan, Bangkok
- President: Mr.Maitree Congrueng

Official website
- www.paralympicthai.com
- (Thailand)

The Sports Association for the Disabled of Thailand (SADT, Thai: สมาคมกีฬาคนพิการแห่งประเทศไทย) is the national governing body for Disabled sports . It is accredited by the International Paralympic Committee (IPC) (the global sports body for people with a disability) and the Paralympic Committee of Thailand (PCT), and is recognized by National Olympic Committee of Thailand (NOCT). It was founded on 11 June 1985.

The association is headquartered in Pathum Wan, Bangkok. The current head of the federation is Col. Osot Pawilai.

=== Sports Association for the Blind of Thailand ===
Sports Association for the Blind of Thailand a division of the Paralympic Committee of Thailand
- Sport: Blind sports
- Jurisdiction: National
- Abbreviation: SABT
- Headquarters: Din Daeng, Bangkok
- President: Mr. Suthon Jitmun
- Secretary: Mr. Vinit Chanmontree

Official website
- www.thaiblindsports.com
- (Thailand)

The Sports Association for the Blind of Thailand (SABT, Thai: สมาคมกีฬาคนตาบอดแห่งประเทศไทย) is the national governing body for Blind sports. It is accredited by the Paralympic Committee of Thailand (PCT).

The association is headquartered in Din Daeng, Bangkok. The current head of the federation is Mr. Suthon Jitmun.

=== Sports Association for the Intellectual Disability of Thailand ===
Sports Association for the Intellectual Disability of Thailand a division of the Paralympic Committee of Thailand
- Sport: Intellectual sports
- Jurisdiction: National
- Abbreviation: SAIT
- Headquarters: Bang Kapi, Bangkok
- President: Mr. Chanwit Munikanont
- Secretary: Mr. Noppadol Chiraboondilok

Official website
- www.saitsport.com
- (Thailand)

The Sports Association for the Intellectual Disability of Thailand (SAIT, Thai: สมาคมกีฬาคนพิการทางปัญญาแห่งประเทศไทย) is the national governing body for Intellectual sports. It is accredited by the Paralympic Committee of Thailand (PCT).

The association is headquartered in Bang Kapi, Bangkok. The current head of the federation is Mr. Chanwit Munikanont.

=== Cerebral Palsy Sports Association of Thailand ===
Cerebral Palsy Sports Association of Thailand a division of the Paralympic Committee of Thailand
- Sport: Cerebral palsy sports
- Jurisdiction: National
- Abbreviation: CPSAT
- Headquarters: Pathum Wan, Bangkok
- President: Mr. Naiyapop Bhirombhakdi
- (Thailand)

The Cerebral Palsy Sports Association of Thailand (CPSAT, Thai: สมาคมกีฬาคนพิการทางสมองแห่งประเทศไทย) is the national governing body for Cerebral palsy sports. It is accredited by the Paralympic Committee of Thailand (PCT).

The association is headquartered in Pathum Wan, Bangkok. The current head of the federation is Mr. Naiyapop Bhirombhakdi.

=== Deaf Sports Association of Thailand ===
Deaf Sports Association of Thailand a division of the Paralympic Committee of Thailand
- Sport: Deaf sports
- Jurisdiction: National
- Abbreviation: DSAP
- Headquarters: Pathum Wan, Bangkok
- (Thailand)

The Deaf Sports Association of Thailand (DSAT, Thai: สมาคมกีฬาคนหูหนวกแห่งประเทศไทย) is the national governing body for Deaf sports. It is accredited by the Paralympic Committee of Thailand (PCT).

The association is headquartered in Pathum Wan, Bangkok.

== See also ==
- Thailand at the Paralympics
- National Olympic Committee of Thailand
