= Equestrian at the 2008 Summer Paralympics – Individual championship test grade IV =

Individual Championship Test Grade IV at the XIII Paralympic Games
- Paralympic Equestrian
- Venue: Hong Kong Olympic Equestrian Centre
- Dates: 8 September 2008
- Competitors: 14 from 10 nations

Medalists
1st place, gold medalist(s)		Philippa Johnson	South Africa
2nd place, silver medalist(s)		Ann Cathrin Lubbe	Norway
3rd place, bronze medalist(s)		Georgia Bruce	Australia

The Equestrian Individual Championship Test Grade IV event at the 2008 Summer Paralympics was held in the Hong Kong Olympic Equestrian Centre on 8 September at 19:15.

The competition was assessed by a ground jury composed of five judges placed at locations designated E, H, C, M, and B. Each judge rated the competitors' performances with a percentage score. The five scores from the jury were then averaged to determine a rider's total percentage score.

The event was won by Philippa Johnson, representing South Africa.

== Ground jury ==
Judge at E	Alison Mastin ( Ireland)
Judge at H	Gudrun Hofinga ( Germany)
Judge at C	Tarja Huttunen ( Finland), jury president
Judge at M	Kjell Myhre ( Norway)
Judge at B	Janet Geary ( Australia)

== Results ==
T = Team Member (see Equestrian at the 2008 Summer Paralympics – Team).

Rank	Rider	Horse	Percentage score (and rank)					Total % score	Note
Rank	Rider	Horse	E	H	C	M	B	Total % score	Note
1st place, gold medalist(s)	Philippa Johnson (RSA)	Benedict	67.097 (2)	66.452 (3)	74.839 (1)	68.387 (2)	69.677 (1)	69.290	T
2nd place, silver medalist(s)	Ann Cathrin Lubbe (NOR)	Zanko	65.806 (4)	69.032 (1)	70.000 (3)	69.032 (1)	68.710 (2)	68.516	T
3rd place, bronze medalist(s)	Georgia Bruce (AUS)	V Salute	67.419 (1)	68.065 (2)	70.968 (2)	66.452 (4)	68.387 (3)	68.258	T
4	Sjerstin Vermeulen (NED)	Sultano	66.129 (3)	65.484 (4)	66.452 (6)	67.742 (3)	66.452 (4)	66.452	T
5	Nathalie Bizet (FRA)	Mephisto	65.484 (5)	64.516 (5)	70.000 (3)	65.484 (5)	66.452 (4)	66.387	
6	Lotten Aronsson (SWE)	Busy Lizzie	62.258 (7)	64.194 (6)	69.355 (5)	64.839 (7)	63.548 (6)	64.839	T
7	Ineke de Groot (NED)	Indo	63.871 (6)	63.226 (7)	60.000 (10)	65.161 (6)	63.548 (6)	63.161	T
8	Sabine Peters (NED)	Donna D.M.	61.613 (9)	60.968 (8)	64.516 (7)	62.903 (9)	62.581 (8)	62.516	T
9	Line Thorning Joergensen (DEN)	Colani-Star	61.935 (8)	60.968 (8)	62.258 (9)	63.226 (8)	60.000 (10)	61.677	T
10	Sigrid Rui (NOR)	Nanof	58.387 (11)	60.645 (10)	60.000 (10)	62.903 (9)	58.387 (12)	60.064	T
11	Eleonore Elstone (CAN)	Lutke	60.645 (10)	60.000 (11)	63.226 (8)	56.452 (14)	58.710 (11)	59.807	T
12	Karen Brain (CAN)	VDL Odette	56.452 (13)	59.677 (12)	57.742 (12)	59.355 (11)	62.258 (9)	59.097	
13	Patrycja Gepner (POL)	Romeo	57.419 (12)	56.129 (14)	55.806 (13)	59.032 (12)	56.452 (13)	56.968	
14	Robin Brueckmann (USA)	Radetzky	56.452 (13)	57.742 (13)	55.484 (14)	56.774 (13)	55.484 (14)	56.387	T
	Henrik Sibbesen (DEN)	Lock Fight	Withdrawn						T
