= Equestrian at the 2004 Summer Paralympics – Individual championship test grade IV =

Mixed Dressage - Championship grade IV at the XII Paralympic Games
- Paralympic Equestrian
- Venue: Markopoulo Olympic Equestrian Centre
- Dates: 22 September 2004
- Competitors: 16 from 14 nations
- Winning points: 70.839

Medalists
1st place, gold medalist(s)		Ann Cathrin Lubbe	Norway
2nd place, silver medalist(s)		Philippa Johnson	South Africa
3rd place, bronze medalist(s)		Karen Brain	Canada

The individual championship test grade IV equestrian event at the 2004 Summer Paralympics was competed on 22 September. It was won by Ann Cathrin Lubbe, representing Norway.

== Final round ==
22 Sept. 2004, 14:00

Rank	Athlete	Points	Notes
1st place, gold medalist(s)	Ann Cathrin Lubbe (NOR)	70.839	
2nd place, silver medalist(s)	Philippa Johnson (RSA)	69.871	
3rd place, bronze medalist(s)	Karen Brain (CAN)	69.677	
4	Jayne Craike (NZL)	69.484	
5	Henrik Sibbesen (DEN)	67.548	
6	Nathalie Bizet (FRA)	67.419	
7	Line Thorning Jørgensen (DEN)	66.581	
8	Sjerstin Vermeulen (NED)	66.452	
9	Michelle Crunkhorn (GBR)	64.258	
10	Jos Knevels (BEL)	63.613	
11	Sigrid Rui (NOR)	63.355	
12	Natalya Zhavoronkova (RUS)	62.000	
13	Kathryn Groves (USA)	61.677	
14	Georgia Bruce (AUS)	61.419	
15	Claudia Straub (SUI)	58.968	
	Kirsty Anderson (BER)	DNS	
