= Equestrian at the 2004 Summer Paralympics – Individual freestyle test grade IV =

Mixed Dressage - Freestyle grade IV at the XII Paralympic Games
- Paralympic Equestrian
- Venue: Markopoulo Olympic Equestrian Centre
- Dates: 24 September 2004
- Competitors: 16 from 14 nations
- Winning points: 80.045

Medalists
1st place, gold medalist(s)		Ann Cathrin Lubbe	Norway
2nd place, silver medalist(s)		Philippa Johnson	South Africa
3rd place, bronze medalist(s)		Karen Brain	Canada

The Individual freestyle test grade IV equestrian event at the 2004 Summer Paralympics was competed on 24 September. It was won by Ann Cathrin Lubbe, representing Norway.

== Final round ==
24 Sept. 2004, 14:00

Rank	Athlete	Points	Notes
1st place, gold medalist(s)	Ann Cathrin Lubbe (NOR)	80.045	
2nd place, silver medalist(s)	Philippa Johnson (RSA)	78.273	
3rd place, bronze medalist(s)	Karen Brain (CAN)	77.227	
4	Jayne Craike (NZL)	64.636	
5	Sjerstin Vermeulen (NED)	73.091	
6	Sigrid Rui (NOR)	72.136	
7	Jos Knevels (BEL)	72.091	
8	Nathalie Bizet (FRA)	70.500	
9	Henrik Sibbesen (DEN)	67.909	
10	Michelle Crunkhorn (GBR)	67.818	
11	Line Thorning Jørgensen (DEN)	67.091	
12	Georgia Bruce (AUS)	67.000	
13	Natalya Zhavoronkova (RUS)	66.545	
14	Kathryn Groves (USA)	66.500	
15	Claudia Straub (SUI)	61.955	
	Kirsty Anderson (BER)	DNS	
