= Equestrian at the 2008 Summer Paralympics – Individual freestyle test grade IV =

Individual Freestyle Test Grade IV at the XIII Paralympic Games
- Paralympic Equestrian
- Venue: Hong Kong Olympic Equestrian Centre
- Dates: 10 September 2008
- Competitors: 14 from 10 nations

Medalists
1st place, gold medalist(s)		Philippa Johnson	South Africa
2nd place, silver medalist(s)		Ann Cathrin Lubbe	Norway
3rd place, bronze medalist(s)		Georgia Bruce	Australia

The Equestrian Individual Freestyle Test Grade IV event at the 2008 Summer Paralympics was held in the Hong Kong Olympic Equestrian Centre on 10 September.

The competition was assessed by a ground jury composed of five judges placed at locations designated E, H, C, M, and B. Each judge rated the competitors' performances with scores out of 10 for technical difficulty and artistic merit. The ten scores from the jury were then summed to determine a rider's total percentage score.

The event was won by Philippa Johnson, representing South Africa.

== Ground jury ==
Judge at E	Janet Geary ( Australia)
Judge at H	Gudrun Hofinga ( Germany)
Judge at C	Tarja Huttunen ( Finland), jury president
Judge at M	Hanneke Gerritsen ( Netherlands)
Judge at B	Anne Prain ( France)

== Results ==
Rank	Rider	Horse		Score (and rank)					Tech/Art Score (Rk)	Total % score
Rank	Rider	Horse		E	H	C	M	B	Tech/Art Score (Rk)	Total % score
1st place, gold medalist(s)	Philippa Johnson (RSA)	Benedict	Tech:	7.091 (3)	7.364 (1)	7.182 (2)	7.545 (1)	7.818 (1)	37.000 (1)	77.272
1st place, gold medalist(s)	Philippa Johnson (RSA)	Benedict	Art:	7.818 (2)	8.318 (1)	7.591 (3)	7.727 (1)	8.818 (1)	40.272 (1)	77.272
2nd place, silver medalist(s)	Ann Cathrin Lubbe (NOR)	Zanko	Tech:	7.273 (1)	7.364 (1)	7.091 (3)	7.182 (2)	7.091 (2)	36.001 (2)	75.046
2nd place, silver medalist(s)	Ann Cathrin Lubbe (NOR)	Zanko	Art:	7.727 (3)	7.682 (3)	7.818 (1)	7.682 (2)	8.136 (2)	39.045 (2)	75.046
3rd place, bronze medalist(s)	Georgia Bruce (AUS)	V Salute	Tech:	7.273 (1)	7.364 (1)	7.273 (1)	6.909 (3)	7.000 (3)	35.819 (3)	74.319
3rd place, bronze medalist(s)	Georgia Bruce (AUS)	V Salute	Art:	7.909 (1)	7.818 (2)	7.818 (1)	7.000 (3)	7.955 (3)	38.500 (3)	74.319
4	Sigrid Rui (NOR)	Nanof	Tech:	6.636 (5)	6.909 (4)	6.364 (8)	6.545 (7)	6.818 (4)	33.272 (6)	69.498
4	Sigrid Rui (NOR)	Nanof	Art:	6.909 (5)	7.636 (4)	7.318 (6)	6.818 (6)	7.545 (4)	36.226 (4)	69.498
5	Nathalie Bizet (FRA)	Mephisto	Tech:	6.545 (6)	6.364 (8)	6.909 (6)	6.818 (4)	6.818 (4)	33.454 (4)	68.453
5	Nathalie Bizet (FRA)	Mephisto	Art:	6.727 (6)	6.727 (7)	7.545 (4)	6.727 (7)	7.273 (6)	34.999 (6)	68.453
6	Lotten Ronsson (SWE)	Busy Lizzie	Tech:	6.182 (9)	6.545 (7)	7.000 (4)	6.727 (5)	6.727 (6)	33.181 (7)	68.362
6	Lotten Ronsson (SWE)	Busy Lizzie	Art:	6.500 (9)	6.909 (5)	7.545 (4)	6.909 (4)	7.318 (5)	35.181 (5)	68.362
7	Sjerstin Vermeulen (NED)	Sultano	Tech:	6.545 (6)	6.636 (6)	7.000 (4)	6.455 (8)	6.636 (7)	33.272 (5)	67.908
7	Sjerstin Vermeulen (NED)	Sultano	Art:	6.727 (6)	6.682 (8)	7.273 (7)	6.909 (4)	7.045 (7)	34.636 (7)	67.908
8	Line Thorning Joergensen (DEN)	Colani-Star	Tech:	6.364 (8)	6.727 (5)	6.273 (9)	6.273 (10)	6.545 (8)	32.182 (9)	66.045
8	Line Thorning Joergensen (DEN)	Colani-Star	Art:	6.727 (6)	6.818 (6)	6.682 (8)	6.727 (7)	6.909 (9)	33.863 (8)	66.045
9	Sabine Peters (NED)	Donna D.M.	Tech:	6.818 (4)	6.091 (12)	6.545 (7)	6.364 (9)	6.455 (9)	32.273 (8)	65.863
9	Sabine Peters (NED)	Donna D.M.	Art:	7.591 (4)	6.545 (9)	6.045 (9)	6.409 (10)	7.000 (8)	33.590 (9)	65.863
10	Karen Brain (CAN)	VDL Odette	Tech:	6.000 (12)	6.182 (11)	6.091 (11)	6.636 (6)	5.909 (11)	30.818 (10)	62.136
10	Karen Brain (CAN)	VDL Odette	Art:	6.318 (12)	6.227 (11)	5.909 (12)	6.591 (9)	6.273 (12)	31.318 (11)	62.136
11	Robin Brueckmann (USA)	Radetzky	Tech:	5.636 (14)	6.273 (9)	5.909 (13)	5.727 (12)	6.182 (10)	29.727 (12)	61.135
11	Robin Brueckmann (USA)	Radetzky	Art:	6.318 (12)	6.545 (9)	5.955 (11)	6.045 (11)	6.545 (10)	31.408 (10)	61.135
12	Eleonore Elstone (CAN)	Lutke	Tech:	6.182 (9)	6.273 (9)	6.182 (10)	5.909 (11)	5.909 (11)	30.455 (11)	60.683
12	Eleonore Elstone (CAN)	Lutke	Art:	6.409 (11)	6.000 (13)	6.000 (10)	5.364 (14)	6.455 (11)	30.228 (12)	60.683
13	Ineke de Groot (NED)	Indo	Tech:	6.182 (9)	5.455 (13)	6.000 (12)	5.455 (13)	5.818 (13)	28.910 (13)	58.955
13	Ineke de Groot (NED)	Indo	Art:	6.455 (10)	6.045 (12)	5.545 (14)	5.864 (13)	6.136 (14)	30.045 (13)	58.955
14	Patrycja Gepner (POL)	Romeo	Tech:	5.727 (13)	5.273 (14)	5.273 (14)	5.182 (14)	5.364 (14)	26.819 (14)	56.819
14	Patrycja Gepner (POL)	Romeo	Art:	6.227 (14)	5.818 (14)	5.636 (13)	6.045 (11)	6.273 (12)	30.000 (14)	56.819
