= Equestrian at the 2004 Summer Paralympics – Team =

Mixed Dressage Team open at the XII Paralympic Games
- Paralympic Equestrian
- Venue: Markopoulo Olympic Equestrian Centre
- Dates: 26 September 2004
- Competitors: 10
- Winning points: 444.866

Medalists
1st place, gold medalist(s)		Deborah Criddle; Anne Dunham; Lee Pearson MBE; Nicola Tustain	Great Britain
2nd place, silver medalist(s)		Britta Naepel; Bianca Vogel; Bettina Eistel	Germany
3rd place, bronze medalist(s)		Joop Stokkel; Gert Bolmer; Sjerstin Vermeulen	Netherlands

The Team equestrian event at the 2004 Summer Paralympics was competed on 26 September. It was won by the team representing Great Britain.

== Final round ==
26 Sept. 2004, 09:00

Rank	Team	Points	Notes
1st place, gold medalist(s)	Great Britain	444.866	
2nd place, silver medalist(s)	Germany	417.109	
3rd place, bronze medalist(s)	Netherlands	413.082	
4	Sweden	410.148	
5	Norway	405.900	
6	Australia	401.014	
7	United States	399.876	
8	Denmark	392.259	
9	Canada	389.976	
10	Israel	384.345	

== Team Lists ==
Great Britain; Deborah Criddle; Anne Dunham; Lee Pearson MBE; Nicola Tustain	Germany; Britta Naepel; Bianca Vogel; Bettina Eistel	Netherlands; Joop Stokkel; Gert Bolmer; Sjerstin Vermeulen	Sweden; Irene Slaettengren; Kerstin Englund; Gabriella Loef; Berit Svensson
Norway; Silje Gillund; Jens Lasse Dokkan; Sigrid Rui; Ann Cathrin Lubbe	Australia; Georgia Bruce; Jan Pike; Anne Skinner; Marita Hird	United States; Barbara Grassmyer; Keith Newerla; Lynn Seidemann; Kathryn Groves	Denmark; Henrik Sibbesen; Line Thorning Jørgensen; Malene Sommerlund; Liselotte Rosenhart
Canada; Judi Island; Lauren Barwick; Dax Adam; Karen Brain	Israel; Omer Ben Dor; Eyal Shahar; Itai Zuck		
