= South Africa at the 2008 Summer Paralympics =

- IPC code: RSA
- NPC: South African Sports Confederation and Olympic Committee
- Website: www.sascoc.co.za

in Beijing
- Competitors: 61 in 9 sports
- Flag bearer: Natalie du Toit
- Medals Ranked 6th: Gold 21 Silver 3 Bronze 6 Total 30

Summer Paralympics appearances (overview)
- 1964; 1968; 1972; 1976; 1980–1988; 1992; 1996; 2000; 2004; 2008; 2012; 2016; 2020; 2024

South Africa sent a team to compete at the 2008 Summer Paralympics in Beijing, China and finished 6th on the medal table.

Natalie du Toit, five time gold medallist at the Athens Paralympics in 2004, competed in six swimming events. She also represented South Africa at the Beijing Olympics. Other members of the swim team included Charl Bouwer, Kevin Paul, Tadgh Slattery, Achmat Hassiem, Shireen Sapiro, Emily Gray, Sarah Shannon, Adri Visser and Beth Nothling. South Africa also sent a swimming official, Sharief Gamiet, to the games.

Oscar Pistorius represented South Africa in athletics.

South African representatives also competed in wheelchair basketball.

== Medalists ==
The following South African athletes won medals at the games:

Medal	Name	Sport	Event
Gold	Natalie du Toit	Swimming	Women's 100 m freestyle - S9
Gold	Natalie du Toit	Swimming	Women's 400 m freestyle - S9
Gold	Oscar Pistorius	Athletics	Men's 400 m - T44
Gold	Ernst van Dyk	Cycling	Men's individual road race HC C
Gold	Shireen Sapiro	Swimming	Women's 100 m backstroke - S9
Gold	Hilton Langenhoven	Athletics	Men's long jump - F12
Gold	Natalie du Toit	Swimming	Women's 100 m butterfly - S9
Gold	Fanie Lombard	Athletics	Men's discus throw - F42
Gold	Charl Bouwer	Swimming	Men's 400 m freestyle - S13
Gold	Natalie du Toit	Swimming	Women's 200 m individual medley - SM9
Gold	Hilton Langenhoven	Athletics	Men's pentathlon - P12
Gold	Philippa Johnson	Equestrian	Individual championship test - grade IV
Gold	Philippa Johnson	Equestrian	Individual freestyle test - grade IV
Gold	Kevin Paul	Swimming	Men's 100 m breaststroke - S9
Gold	Fanie van der Merwe	Athletics	Men's 100 m - T37
Gold	Oscar Pistorius	Athletics	Men's 100 m - T44
Gold	Hilton Langenhoven	Athletics	Men's 200 m - T12
Gold	Fanie van der Merwe	Athletics	Men's 200 m - T37
Gold	Oscar Pistorius	Athletics	Men's 200 m - T44
Gold	Natalie du Toit	Swimming	Women's 50 m freestyle - S9
Gold	Ilse Hayes	Athletics	Women's long jump - F13
Silver	David Roos	Athletics	Men's long jump - F46
Silver	Riaan Nel	Cycling	Mixed Individual Road race CP 1/CP 2
Silver	Ilse Hayes	Athletics	Women's 100 m - T13
Bronze	Ernst van Dyk	Athletics	Men's marathon - T54
Bronze	Gavin Kilpatrick; Michael Thomson	Cycling	Men's sprint (B&VI 1-3)
Bronze	Fanie Lombard	Athletics	Men's shot put - F42
Bronze	Nicholas Newman	Athletics	Men's javelin throw - F35/36
Bronze	Tadhg Slattery	Swimming	Men's 100 m breaststroke - S5
Bronze	Teboho Mokgalagadi	Athletics	Men's 100 m - T35

== Sports ==
=== Athletics ===
==== Men's track ====
Athlete	Class	Event	Heats		Semifinal		Final	
Athlete	Class	Event	Result	Rank	Result	Rank	Result	Rank
Arnu Fourie	T44	100m	12.05	8 q	—N/a		11.65	4
Hilton Langenhoven	T12	200m	22.20	1 Q	22.06	1 Q	21.94	1st place, gold medalist(s)
Teboho Mokgalagadi	T35	100m	—N/a				12.82	3rd place, bronze medalist(s)
Jonathan Ntutu	T13	100m	11.32	5 q	—N/a		11.06	5
Jonathan Ntutu	T13	200m	22.71	8 Q	—N/a		22.85	8
Oscar Pistorius	T44	100m	11.16 =PR	1 Q	—N/a		11.17	1st place, gold medalist(s)
Oscar Pistorius	T44	200m	22.71	1 Q	—N/a		21.67 PR	1st place, gold medalist(s)
Oscar Pistorius	T44	400m	—N/a				47.49 WR	1st place, gold medalist(s)
David Roos	T46	100m	11.73	16	did not advance			
David Roos	T46	200m	23.54	15	did not advance			
Marius Stander	T38	200m	24.35	8 Q	—N/a		24.23	8
Marius Stander	T38	400m	—N/a				52.56	4
Fanie van der Merwe	T37	100m	11.97 PR	1 Q	—N/a		11.83 PR	1st place, gold medalist(s)
Fanie van der Merwe	T37	200m	24.04 PR	1 Q	—N/a		23.84 WR	1st place, gold medalist(s)
Ernst van Dyk	T54	Marathon	—N/a				1:23:18	3rd place, bronze medalist(s)

==== Men's field ====
Athlete	Class	Event	Final		
Athlete	Class	Event	Result	Points	Rank
Hilton Langenhoven	F12	Long jump	7.31 PR	-	1st place, gold medalist(s)
Hilton Langenhoven	P12	Pentathlon	3403		1st place, gold medalist(s)
Fanie Lombaard	F42	Discus throw	46.75	-	1st place, gold medalist(s)
Fanie Lombaard	F42	Shot put	13.87	-	3rd place, bronze medalist(s)
Nicholas Newman	F35-36	Javelin throw	42.48 SB	1147	3rd place, bronze medalist(s)
David Roos	F44/46	High jump	1.84	920	8
David Roos	F46	Long jump	6.64 SB	-	2nd place, silver medalist(s)
Duane Strydom	F35-36	Discus throw	36.47	1044	4

==== Women's track ====
Athlete	Class	Event	Heats		Semifinal		Final	
Athlete	Class	Event	Result	Rank	Result	Rank	Result	Rank
Ilse Hayes	T13	100m	12.58	2 Q	—N/a		12.45	2nd place, silver medalist(s)
Ilse Hayes	T13	200m	26.46	5 Q	—N/a		26.22	5
Sarisa Marais	T44	100m	15.19	11	did not advance			
Sarisa Marais	T44	200m	—N/a				30.41	7

==== Women's field ====
Athlete	Class	Event	Final		
Athlete	Class	Event	Result	Points	Rank
Ilse Hayes	F13	Long jump	5.68	-	1st place, gold medalist(s)
Zanele Situ	F54-56	Discus throw	13.83 SB	820	9
Zanele Situ	F54-56	Javelin throw	14.82	1012	7
Zanele Situ	F54-56	Shot put	5.07	817	12
Chenelle van Zyl	F35-36	Discus throw	22.16	923	6
Chenelle van Zyl	F35-36	Shot put	7.42	795	5
Chenelle van Zyl	F35-38	Javelin throw	17.86 SB	810	14

=== Cycling ===
==== Men's road ====
Athlete	Event	Time	Rank
Riaan Nel	Mixed road race	48:32	2nd place, silver medalist(s)
Riaan Nel	Mixed road time trial	24:23.26	5
Janos Plekker	Men's road race CP4	2:01:23	23
Janos Plekker	Men's road time trial CP4	38:43.17	8
Ernst van Dyk	Men's road race HC C	1:21:40	1st place, gold medalist(s)
Ernst van Dyk	Men's road time trial HC C	21:01.59	4
Gavin Kilpatrick; Michael Thomson (pilot)	Men's individual road race B&VI 1-3	2:29:18	12
Gavin Kilpatrick; Michael Thomson (pilot)	Men's individual time trial B&VI 1-3	36:24.91	17

==== Women's road ====
Athlete	Event	Time	Rank
Roxy Burns	Women's road time trial LC1/2/CP4	53:07.14	10
Susan van Staden	Women's road time trial LC3/4/CP3	50:15.34	9

==== Men's track ====
Athlete	Event	Qualification		Quarterfinals		Semifinals		Final	
Athlete	Event	Time	Rank	Time	Rank	Time	Rank	Opposition Time	Rank
Janos Plekker	Men's 1km time trial CP4	—N/a						1:15.55	5
Janos Plekker	Men's individual pursuit CP4	3:55.933	8	did not advance					
Gavin Kilpatrick; Michael Thomson	Men's 1km time trial B&VI 1-3	—N/a						1:04.130	4
Gavin Kilpatrick; Michael Thomson	Men's individual pursuit B&VI 1-3	4:32.191	6	did not advance					
Gavin Kilpatrick; Michael Thomson	Men's sprint	10.641	3 Q	Delaney (IRL) / Peelo (IRL); W 11.529; W 11.728	Q	Demery (AUS) / Hopkins (AUS); L	q	Oshiro (JPN) / Takahashi (JPN); W 11.517	3rd place, bronze medalist(s)

==== Women's track ====
Athlete	Event	Qualification		1st round		Final	
Athlete	Event	Time	Rank	Time	Rank	Opposition Time	Rank
Roxy Burns	Women's individual pursuit LC1-2/CP4	4:07.368	9	did not advance			
Roxy Burns	Women's time trial LC1-2/CP4	—N/a				38.9	6
Susan van Staden	Women's individual pursuit LC3-4/CP3	4:44.792	9	did not advance			
Susan van Staden	Women's time trial LC3-4/CP3	—N/a				47.1	7

=== Equestrian ===
==== Individual events ====
Athlete	Horse	Event	Total	
Athlete	Horse	Event	Score	Rank
Mark Frenzel	Waldfee 697	Mixed individual championship test grade Ia	52.100	12
Mark Frenzel	Waldfee 697	Mixed individual freestyle test grade Ia	49.166	13
Philippa Johnson	Benedict	Mixed individual championship test grade IV	69.290	1st place, gold medalist(s)
Philippa Johnson	Benedict	Mixed individual freestyle test grade IV	77.272	1st place, gold medalist(s)
Marion Milne	Waldfee 697	Mixed individual championship test grade Ib	58.095	13
Marion Milne	Waldfee 697	Mixed individual freestyle test grade Ib	62.333	10
Kerry Noble	De Vito	Mixed individual championship test grade II	51.909	17
Kerry Noble	De Vito	Mixed individual freestyle test grade II	55.053	17

==== Team ====
Athlete	Horse	Event	Individual score			Total	
Athlete	Horse	Event	TT	CT	Total	Score	Rank
Mark Frenzel	See above	Team	48.706	52.100	100.806*	352.948	12
Philippa Johnson	See above	Team	70.286	69.290	139.576*	352.948	12
Marion Milne	See above	Team	54.471	58.095	112.566*	352.948	12
Kerry Noble	See above	Team	48.667	51.909	100.576	352.948	12

* Indicated the three best individual scores that count towards the team total.

=== Powerlifting ===
==== Women ====
Athlete	Event	Result	Rank
Moekie Grobbelaar	52kg	80.0	8

=== Rowing ===
Athlete	Event	Heats		Repechage		Final	
Athlete	Event	Time	Rank	Time	Rank	Time	Rank
Jarred Clarke; Gordon Eddey; Kevin du Toit; Kim Robinson; Masego Mokhine	Mixed coxed four	3:42.40	7 R	3:55.03	6 FB	3:51.91	2

=== Swimming ===
==== Men ====
Athlete	Class	Event	Heats		Final	
Athlete	Class	Event	Result	Rank	Result	Rank
Charl Bouwer	S13	100m backstroke	1:03.76	3 Q	1:03.86	4
Charl Bouwer	S13	100m butterfly	1:02.37	6 Q	1:01.72	6
Charl Bouwer	S13	50m freestyle	25.41	10	did not advance	
Charl Bouwer	S13	100m freestyle	55.14	5 Q	54.99	6
Charl Bouwer	S13	400m freestyle	4:21.58	1 Q	4:14.02 WR	1st place, gold medalist(s)
Achmat Hassiem	S10	100m butterfly	1:01.61	9	did not advance	
Kevin Paul	S10	400m freestyle	4:27.57	7 Q	4:27.68	7
Kevin Paul	SB9	100m breaststroke	1:08.70 WR	1 Q	1:08.58 WR	1st place, gold medalist(s)
Kevin Paul	SM10	200m individual medley	2:22.15	9	did not advance	
Tadhg Slattery	SB5	100m breaststroke	1:37.44	3 Q	1:36.11	3rd place, bronze medalist(s)
Tadhg Slattery	SM6	200m individual medley	3:12.49	9	did not advance	

==== Women ====
Athlete	Class	Event	Heats		Final	
Athlete	Class	Event	Result	Rank	Result	Rank
Natalie du Toit	S9	100m butterfly	1:07.08 PR	1 Q	1:06.74 WR	1st place, gold medalist(s)
Natalie du Toit	S9	50m freestyle	29.45 PR	1 Q	29.20 PR	1st place, gold medalist(s)
Natalie du Toit	S9	100m freestyle	1:02.19 PR	1 Q	1:01.44 PR	1st place, gold medalist(s)
Natalie du Toit	S9	400m freestyle	4:24.75 PR	1 Q	4:23.81 WR	1st place, gold medalist(s)
Natalie du Toit	SM9	200m individual medley	2:30.13	1 Q	2:27.83 WR	1st place, gold medalist(s)
Emily Gray	S9	100m backstroke	1:20.01	13	did not advance	
Beth Nothling	S5	50m backstroke	55.88	8 Q	54.29	7
Shireen Sapiro	S10	100m backstroke	1:13.04	2 Q	1:10.57 WR	1st place, gold medalist(s)
Shireen Sapiro	S10	100m butterfly	1:16.02	8 Q	1:17.07	7
Shireen Sapiro	S10	50m freestyle	31.85	13	did not advance	
Shireen Sapiro	S10	100m freestyle	1:08.50	13	did not advance	
Sarah Shannon	S3	50m backstroke	1:14.24	6 Q	1:13.83	6
Sarah Shannon	S3	50m freestyle	1:15.59	8 Q	1:13.39	7
Adri Visser	S5	100m freestyle	1:49.61	11	did not advance	
Adri Visser	S5	200m freestyle	3:52.72	13	did not advance	

=== Table Tennis ===
==== Men ====
Athlete	Event	Preliminaries				Round of 16	Quarterfinals	Semifinals	Final / BM	
Athlete	Event	Opposition Result	Opposition Result	Opposition Result	Rank	Opposition Result	Opposition Result	Opposition Result	Opposition Result	Rank
Johan du Plooy	Men's singles C7	Seidenfeld (USA); L 0-3	Messi (FRA); L 0-3	Jurasz (POL); L 1-3	4	did not advance				
Pieter du Plooy	Men's singles C6	Rosenmeier (DEN); L 0–3	Buzin (RUS); L 0–3	Arguello Garcia (CRC); W 3–0	3	did not advance				
Johan du Plooy; Pieter du Plooy	Men's team C6-8	No preliminaries				Israel (ISR); L 0-3	did not advance			

==== Women ====
Athlete	Event	Preliminaries				Round of 16	Quarterfinals	Semifinals	Final / BM
Athlete	Event	Opposition Result	Opposition Result	Opposition Result	Rank	Opposition Result	Opposition Result	Opposition Result	Rank
Alisha Almeida	Women's singles C4	Zhou Y (CHN); L 0–3	Gilroy (GBR); L 0–3	Matic (SRB); L 0–3	4	did not advance			
Alet Moll	Women's singles C3	Brunelli (ITA); L 0-3	Ahlquist (SWE); L 1-3	Fillou (FRA); L 0-3	4	did not advance			
Alisha Almeida; Alet Moll	Women's team C4-5	No preliminaries				Jordan (JOR); L 0-3	did not advance		

=== Wheelchair Basketball ===
==== Players ====
- Justin Govender
- Marcus Retief
- David Curle
- Grant Waites
- Jeremiah Nel
- Marius Papenfus
- Nick Taylor
- Ralph Taylor
- Richard Nortje
- Shaun Hartnick
- Siphamandla Gumbi
- Thandile Zonke
- William Reichart

==== Tournament ====
Group A Matches

7 September 2008
09:00

Iran (IRI)	73–62	South Africa (RSA)
Scoring by quarter: 13 - 10, 20 - 18, 23 - 15, 17 - 19

National Indoor Stadium, Beijing
Attendance: 11500
Referees: Max Kindervater (GER)

8 September 2008
17:45

South Africa (RSA)	55–80	Canada (CAN)
Scoring by quarter: 12 - 25, 12 - 21, 24 - 16, 7 - 18

National Indoor Stadium, Beijing
Attendance: 1376
Referees: Matias Quintana (ARG)

9 September 2008
12:15

Germany (GER)	96–43	South Africa (RSA)
Scoring by quarter: 21 - 8, 25 - 8, 26 - 10, 24 - 17

National Indoor Stadium, Beijing
Attendance: 1095
Referees: Andre Bosveld (NED)

10 September 2008
11:15

South Africa (RSA)	64–58	Sweden (SWE)
Scoring by quarter: 11 - 15, 16 - 4, 11 - 13, 26 - 16

National Indoor Stadium, Beijing
Attendance: 7262
Referees: Sergio Giordano (CAN)

11 September 2008
12:15

Japan (JPN)	60–58	South Africa (RSA)
Scoring by quarter: 15 - 17, 11 - 10, 14 - 16, 20 - 15

National Indoor Stadium, Beijing
Attendance: 1302
Referees: Bill Kuerzi (USA)

Classification 9-12

12 September 2008
11:15

South Africa (RSA)	67–60	China (CHN)
Scoring by quarter: 13 - 14, 19 - 15, 19 - 27, 16 - 4

National Indoor Stadium, Beijing
Attendance: 8854
Referees: Jonathon Blake Burford (USA)

Ninth place

16 September 2008
11:15

Brazil (BRA)	68–46	South Africa (RSA)
Scoring by quarter: 19 - 17, 18 - 11, 19 - 9, 12 - 9

National Indoor Station, Beijing
Attendance: 11204
Referees: Bill Kuerzi (USA)

=== Wheelchair Tennis ===
==== Men ====
Athlete	Class	Event	Round of 64	Round of 32	Round of 16	Quarterfinals	Semifinals	Finals
Athlete	Class	Event	Opposition Result	Opposition Result	Opposition Result	Opposition Result	Opposition Result	Opposition Result
Sydwell Mathonsi	Open	Men's singles	Batycki (POL); L 2-6, 1-6	did not advance				

==== Women ====
Athlete	Class	Event	Round of 32	Round of 16	Quarterfinals	Semifinals	Finals
Athlete	Class	Event	Opposition Result	Opposition Result	Opposition Result	Opposition Result	Opposition Result
Kgothatso Montjane	Open	Women's singles	Verfuerth (USA); L 4-6, 0-6	did not advance			

== See also ==
- South Africa at the 2008 Summer Olympics
- South Africa at the Paralympics
