= South Africa at the 2004 Summer Paralympics =

- IPC code: RSA
- NPC: South African Sports Confederation and Olympic Committee
- Website: www.sascoc.co.za

in Athens
- Competitors: 51
- Medals Ranked 13th: Gold 15 Silver 13 Bronze 7 Total 35

Summer Paralympics appearances (overview)
- 1964; 1968; 1972; 1976; 1980–1988; 1992; 1996; 2000; 2004; 2008; 2012; 2016; 2020; 2024

South Africa competed at the 2004 Summer Paralympics in Athens, Greece. The team included 51 athletes, 31 men and 20 women. Competitors from South Africa won 35 medals, including 15 gold, 13 silver and 7 bronze to finish 13th in the medal table.

== Medallists ==
Medal	Name	Sport	Event
Gold	Teboho Mokgalagadi	Athletics	Men's 100m T35
Gold	Teboho Mokgalagadi	Athletics	Men's 200m T35
Gold	Oscar Pistorius	Athletics	Men's 200m T44
Gold	Malcolm Pringle	Athletics	Men's 800m T38
Gold	Fanie Lombaard	Athletics	Men's shot put F42
Gold	Michael Louwrens	Athletics	Men's shot put F57
Gold	Fanie Lombaard	Athletics	Men's discus throw F42
Gold	Nicholas Newman	Athletics	Men's javelin throw F36/38
Gold	Zanele Situ	Athletics	Women's javelin throw F54/55
Gold	Tadhg Slattery	Swimming	Men's 100m breaststroke SB5
Gold	Natalie du Toit	Swimming	Women's 50m freestyle S9
Gold	Natalie du Toit	Swimming	Women's 100m freestyle S9
Gold	Natalie du Toit	Swimming	Women's 400m freestyle S9
Gold	Natalie du Toit	Swimming	Women's 100m butterfly S9
Gold	Natalie du Toit	Swimming	Women's 200m individual medley SM9
Silver	Nathan Meyer	Athletics	Men's 200m T13
Silver	Malcolm Pringle	Athletics	Men's 400m T38
Silver	Ernst van Dyk	Athletics	Men's 800m T54
Silver	Ernst van Dyk	Athletics	Men's 1500m T54
Silver	Hilton Langenhoven	Athletics	Men's long jump F12
Silver	Fabian Michaels	Athletics	Men's javelin throw F35
Silver	Fanie Lombaard	Athletics	Men's javelin throw F42
Silver	Philippa Johnson	Equestrian	Mixed individual championship dressage grade IV
Silver	Philippa Johnson	Equestrian	Mixed individual freestyle dressage grave IV
Silver	Scott Field	Swimming	Men's 100m freestyle S13
Silver	Scott Field	Swimming	Men's 400m freestyle S13
Silver	Scott Field	Swimming	Men's 100m butterfly S13
Silver	Natalie du Toit	Swimming	Women's 100m backstroke S9
Bronze	Oscar Pistorius	Athletics	Men's 100m T44
Bronze	Ernst van Dyk	Athletics	Men's 5000m T54
Bronze	Duane Strydom	Athletics	Men's discus throw F36
Bronze	Ilse Hayes	Athletics	Women's 400m T13
Bronze	Beverly Mashinini	Athletics	Women's javelin throw F35-38
Bronze	Adriaan Nel	Cycling	Men's tricycle time trial CP 1/2
Bronze	Scott Field	Swimming	Men's 50m freestyle S13

== Sports ==
=== Athletics ===
==== Men's track ====
Athlete	Class	Event	Heats		Semifinal		Final	
Athlete	Class	Event	Result	Rank	Result	Rank	Result	Rank
Le Irvine de Kock	T37	100m	12.20	1 Q	N/A		12.56	4
Le Irvine de Kock	T37	200m	24.98	1 Q	N/A		25.24	5
Le Irvine de Kock	T37	400m	N/A				56.43	5
Hilton Langenhoven	T12	100m	11.33	8 q	11.28	7 B	11.40	4
Hilton Langenhoven	T12	200m	22.62	4 Q	22.49	5 B	DNS	
Nathan Meyer	T13	100m	11.22	4 Q	N/A		11.34	5
Nathan Meyer	T13	200m	22.67	3 Q	N/A		22.96	2nd place, silver medalist(s)
Teboho Mokgalgadi	T35	100m	13.07 WR	1 Q	N/A		13.05 WR	1st place, gold medalist(s)
Teboho Mokgalgadi	T35	200m	N/A				26.80 PR	1st place, gold medalist(s)
Jonathan Ntutu	T13	100m	11.34	9	did not advance			
Oscar Pistorius	T44	100m	11.43	4 Q	N/A		11.16	3rd place, bronze medalist(s)
Oscar Pistorius	T44	200m	23.42 WR	1 Q	N/A		21.97 WR	1st place, gold medalist(s)
Malcolm Pringle	T38	200m	24.60	6 Q	N/A		23.76	6
Malcolm Pringle	T38	400m	52.91	3 Q	N/A		51.51	2nd place, silver medalist(s)
Malcolm Pringle	T38	800m	N/A				1:58.87 WR	1st place, gold medalist(s)
David Roos	T46	200m	24.22	11	did not advance			
Krige Schabort	T54	10000m	21:08.97	3 Q	N/A		20:54.56	8
Krige Schabort	T54	Marathon	N/A				1:39:53	15
Ernst van Dyk	T54	800m	1:35.30	3 Q	N/A		1:32.53	2nd place, silver medalist(s)
Ernst van Dyk	T54	1500m	3:04.50	8 Q	3:07.18	8 Q	3:05.29	2nd place, silver medalist(s)
Ernst van Dyk	T54	5000m	10:25.20	4 Q	N/A		10:24.07	3rd place, bronze medalist(s)
Ernst van Dyk	T54	Marathon	N/A				1:41:59	18
Le Irvine de Kock; Fabian Michaels; Teboho Mokgalagadi; Malcolm Pringle	T35-38	4 × 100 m relay	N/A				49.09	4

==== Men's field ====
Athlete	Class	Event	Final		
Athlete	Class	Event	Result	Points	Rank
Hilton Langenhoven	F12	Javelin	48.26	-	7
Hilton Langenhoven	F12	Long jump	7.03	-	2nd place, silver medalist(s)
Fanie Lombaard	F42	Discus	45.56	-	1st place, gold medalist(s)
Fanie Lombaard	F42	Javelin	47.02	-	2nd place, silver medalist(s)
Fanie Lombaard	F42	Shot put	13.81 WR	-	1st place, gold medalist(s)
Michael Louwrens	F57	Discus	DNS		
Michael Louwrens	F57	Shot put	13.31 PR	-	1st place, gold medalist(s)
Fabian Michaels	F35	Discus	28.48	-	9
Fabian Michaels	F35	Javelin	42.22	-	2nd place, silver medalist(s)
Fabian Michaels	F38	Shot put	9.68	-	8
Nicholas Newman	F36	Shot put	10.08	-	5
Nicholas Newman	F36/38	Javelin	38.09	-	1st place, gold medalist(s)
Jonathan Ntutu	F13	Long jump	6.15	-	6
David Roos	F44/46	High jump	1.85	-	5
David Roos	F46	Long jump	6.57	-	4
Duane Strydom	F36	Discus	32.96	-	3rd place, bronze medalist(s)
Duane Strydom	F36	Shot put	9.82	-	6

==== Women's track ====
Athlete	Class	Event	Heats		Semifinal		Final	
Athlete	Class	Event	Result	Rank	Result	Rank	Result	Rank
Ilse Hayes	T13	100m	N/A				13.23	5
Ilse Hayes	T13	400m	N/A				1:00.17	3rd place, bronze medalist(s)
Dominique Vogel	T37	100m	N/A				15.54	5
Dominique Vogel	T37	200m	N/A				32.86	4
Dominique Vogel	T38	400m	N/A				1:19.94	7

==== Women's field ====
Athlete	Class	Event	Final		
Athlete	Class	Event	Result	Points	Rank
Sonja Lloyd	F32-34/52/53	Discus	12.19	891	6
Sonja Lloyd	F32-34/52/53	Javelin	10.13	957	9
Sonja Lloyd	F32-34/52/53	Shot put	5.68	1047	7
Jane Mandean	F35/36	Shot put	7.58	1091	4
Jane Mandean	F35/36/38	Discus	19.38	1093	6
Jane Mandean	F35-38	Javelin	17.69	1003	7
Beverly Mashinini	F35/36	Shot put	5.87	844	12
Beverly Mashinini	F35/36/38	Discus	16.31	919	10
Beverly Mashinini	F35-38	Javelin	21.94	1245	3rd place, bronze medalist(s)
Zanele Situ	F54/55	Discus	13.41	888	7
Zanele Situ	F54/55	Javelin	14.75 WR	1145	1st place, gold medalist(s)
Zanele Situ	F54/55	Shot put	5.37	883	6
Carine Swanepoel	F42	Long jump	2.82	-	10
Tanya Swanepoel	F32-34/52/53	Discus	11.85	866	7
Tanya Swanepoel	F32-34/52/53	Shot put	5.35	986	8
Chennele van Zyl	F35/36	Shot put	6.41	922	9
Chennele van Zyl	F35/36/38	Discus	18.21	1027	8
Chennele van Zyl	F35-38	Javelin	17.35	984	8

=== Cycling ===
==== Men's road ====
Athlete	Event	Time	Rank
Stephan Herholdt	Men's road race / time trial CP div 4	1:52:47	9
Adriaan Nel	Men's tricycle road race CP div 1/2	DNF	
Adriaan Nel	Men's tricycle time trial CP div 1/2	10:10.58	3rd place, bronze medalist(s)
Janos Plekker	Men's road race / time trial CP div 4	1:53:16	10

==== Men's track ====
Athlete	Event	Qualification		1st round		Final	
Athlete	Event	Time	Rank	Time	Rank	Opposition Time	Rank
Stephan Herholdt	Men's 1km time trial CP div 3/4	N/A				1:15.71	8
Stephan Herholdt	Men's individual pursuit CP div 4	3:56.17	6 Q	Bouska (CZE); L OVL	6	did not advance	
Janos Plekker	Men's 1km time trial CP div 3/4	N/A				1:16.98	11
Janos Plekker	Men's individual pursuit CP div 4	3:58.45	7	Homann (AUS); L OVL	6	did not advance	

==== Women's road ====
Athlete	Event	Time	Rank
Susan van Staden	Women's time trial LC1-4/CP 3/4	31:10.03	10

==== Women's track ====
Athlete	Event	Qualification		Final	
Athlete	Event	Time	Rank	Opposition Time	Rank
Susan van Staden	Women's 1km time trial LC1-4/CP 3/4	N/A		1:24.06	10

=== Equestrian ===
Athlete	Event	Total	
Athlete	Event	Score	Rank
Philippa Johnson	Mixed individual championship test grade IV	69.871	2nd place, silver medalist(s)
Philippa Johnson	Mixed individual freestyle test grade IV	78.273	2nd place, silver medalist(s)
Wendy Olivier	Mixed individual championship test grade II	53.727	19
Wendy Olivier	Mixed individual championship test grade II	57.278	20

=== Powerlifting ===
==== Men ====
Athlete	Event	Result	Rank
Coetzee Wium	90kg	190.0	7

==== Women ====
Athlete	Event	Result	Rank
Moekie Grobbelaar	56kg	87.5	5
Annah Mooketshi	52kg	87.5	4
Chantell Stierman	60kg	85.0	7

=== Shooting ===
Athlete	Event	Qualification		Final		
Athlete	Event	Score	Rank	Score	Total	Rank
Vonnie Koehne	Men's 10m air pistol SH1	DNS		did not advance		
Vonnie Koehne	Mixed 25m sport pistol SH1	563	5	97.4	660.4	6

=== Swimming ===
==== Men ====
Athlete	Class	Event	Heats		Final	
Athlete	Class	Event	Result	Rank	Result	Rank
Charl Bouwer	S13	400m freestyle	4:47.31	6 Q	4:49.39	8
Charl Bouwer	S13	100m backstroke	1:12.77	7 Q	1:12.11	7 Q
Charl Bouwer	SM13	200m individual medley	2:43.46	10	did not advance	
Tiaan du Plessis	S8	50m freestyle	30.76	8 Q	30.26	8
Tiaan du Plessis	S8	100m freestyle	1:05.73	7 Q	1:06.11	8
Tiaan du Plessis	S8	100m backstroke	1:19.55	8 Q	1:19.67	8
Scott Field	S13	50m freestyle	25.54	2 Q	25.48	3rd place, bronze medalist(s)
Scott Field	S13	100m freestyle	57.29	1 Q	55.36	2nd place, silver medalist(s)
Scott Field	S13	400m freestyle	4:44.98	2 Q	4:30.19	2nd place, silver medalist(s)
Scott Field	S13	100m butterfly	1:01.65	2 Q	1:01.75	2nd place, silver medalist(s)
Ebert Kleynhans	S12	50m freestyle	26.68	7 Q	26.60	7
Ebert Kleynhans	S12	100m freestyle	58.95	8 Q	59.38	8
Ebert Kleynhans	S12	100m butterfly	1:08.59	9	did not advance	
Oliver Nathan	S8	100m freestyle	1:07.48	14	did not advance	
Oliver Nathan	S8	400m freestyle	5:20.56	10	did not advance	
Oliver Nathan	S8	100m butterfly	1:15.17	6 Q	1:14.57	6
Tadhg Slattery	S7	50m butterfly	40.53	15	did not advance	
Tadhg Slattery	SB5	100m breaststroke	1:33.03	1 Q	1:33.01	1st place, gold medalist(s)
Tadhg Slattery	SM6	200m individual medley	3:06.18	5 Q	3:06.00	6

==== Women ====
Athlete	Class	Event	Heats		Final	
Athlete	Class	Event	Result	Rank	Result	Rank
Handri de Beer	S12	50m freestyle	32.41	9	did not advance	
Handri de Beer	S12	100m freestyle	1:09.49	11	did not advance	
Handri de Beer	S12	400m freestyle	N/A		5:23.99	7
Handri de Beer	S12	100m butterfly	1:16.85	4 Q	1:16.79	5
Handri de Beer	SM12	200m individual medley	3:02.64	10	did not advance	
Natalie du Toit	S9	50m freestyle	29.54 PR	1 Q	29.52 WR	1st place, gold medalist(s)
Natalie du Toit	S9	100m freestyle	1:02.92 PR	1 Q	1:02.83 PR	1st place, gold medalist(s)
Natalie du Toit	S9	400m freestyle	4:43.66 PR	1 Q	4:28.09 WR	1st place, gold medalist(s)
Natalie du Toit	S9	100m backstroke	1:12.12	1 Q	1:11.41	2nd place, silver medalist(s)
Natalie du Toit	S9	100m butterfly	1:07.69 WR	1 Q	1:07.54 WR	1st place, gold medalist(s)
Natalie du Toit	SB8	100m breaststroke	1:30.95	4 Q	1:30.17	4
Natalie du Toit	SM9	200m individual medley	2:32.19 WR	1 Q	2:29.98 WR	1st place, gold medalist(s)
Elizabeth Freiin von Wechmar	S6	400m freestyle	7:21.61	9	did not advance	
Elizabeth Freiin von Wechmar	SB5	100m breaststroke	N/A		2:10.16	7

=== Table tennis ===
==== Men ====
Athlete	Event	Preliminaries				Quarterfinals	Semifinals	Final / BM	
Athlete	Event	Opposition Result	Opposition Result	Opposition Result	Rank	Opposition Result	Opposition Result	Opposition Result	Rank
Johan du Plooy	Men's singles 8	Ledoux (BEL); L 0-3	Soukup (CZE); L 1-3	Lo (USA); L 1-3	4	did not advance			
Pieter du Plooy	Men's singles 6	Rosenmeier (DEN); L 0-3	Buzin (RUS); L 0-3	Ono (JPN); W 3-0	3	did not advance			
Mark Nilsen	Men's singles 5	Robles (ESP); L 1–3	Bolldén (SWE); L 1-3	Kalyvas (GRE); W 3–0	3	did not advance			
Johan du Plooy; Pieter du Plooy	Men's team 8	France (FRA); L 0-3	Slovakia (SVK); L 0-3	N/A	3	did not advance			

==== Women ====
Athlete	Event	Preliminaries				Quarterfinals	Semifinals	Final / BM	
Athlete	Event	Opposition Result	Opposition Result	Opposition Result	Rank	Opposition Result	Opposition Result	Opposition Result	Rank
Aletta Moll	Women's singles 3	Pintar (SLO); L 0–3	Fujiwara (JPN); L 0–3	N/A	3	did not advance			
Rosabelle Riese	Women's singles 4	Pape (GER); L 1-3	Rast (SUI); L 1-3	Pillarova (SVK); L 0-3	4	did not advance			

=== Wheelchair tennis ===
==== Men ====
Athlete	Class	Event	Round of 64	Round of 32	Round of 16	Quarterfinals	Semifinals	Finals
Athlete	Class	Event	Opposition Result	Opposition Result	Opposition Result	Opposition Result	Opposition Result	Opposition Result
Adrian Hubbard	Open	Men's singles	Brychta (CZE); L 0-6, 0-6	did not advance				
Joppie Victor	Open	Men's singles	Weekes (AUS); L 1-6, 2-6	did not advance				
Adrian Hubbard; Joppie Victor	Open	Men's doubles	N/A	Legner (AUT); Baumgartner (AUT); L 0-6, 1-6	did not advance			

== See also ==
- South Africa at the Paralympics
- South Africa at the 2004 Summer Olympics
