= Equestrian at the 2008 Summer Paralympics – Team =

Equestrian Overall Team at the XIII Paralympic Games
- Paralympic Equestrian
- Venue: Hong Kong Olympic Equestrian Centre
- Dates: 7–9 September 2008
- Competitors: 12

Medalists
1st place, gold medalist(s)		Sophie Christiansen; Anne Dunham; Lee Pearson; Simon Laurens	Great Britain
2nd place, silver medalist(s)		Britta Naepel; Angelika Trabert; Steffen Zeibig; Hannelore Brenner	Germany
3rd place, bronze medalist(s)		Jens Dokkan; Mariette Garborg; Ann Cathrin Lubbe; Sigrid Rui	Norway

The team championship, para-equestrian dressage event at the 2008 Summer Paralympics was decided by tests ridden at Hong Kong Olympic Equestrian Centre. Each rider performed two tests, the Team Test on September 7 and the Individual Championship Test on September 8–9 (for which individual medals were also awarded). Team scores were the sum of the best 3 Team Tests and best 3 Championship Test (not necessarily the same 3 riders).

== Team ranking ==
TT = Team Test; CT = Championship Test; # = Score counted in team total. WD=withdrawn.

Rank	Country	Rider	Grade	Horse	TT%		CT%		Team Score
1st place, gold medalist(s)	Great Britain	Sophie Christiansen	Ia	Lambrusco III	72.000	#	72.800	#	439.608
1st place, gold medalist(s)	Great Britain	Anne Dunham	Ia	Teddy	75.176	#	73.100	#	439.608
1st place, gold medalist(s)	Great Britain	Lee Pearson	Ib	Gentlemen	73.294	#	73.238	#	439.608
1st place, gold medalist(s)	Great Britain	Simon Laurens	III	Ocean Diamond	69.538		62.880		439.608
2nd place, silver medalist(s)	Germany	Britta Naepel	II	Cherubin 15	62.667		71.909	#	413.532
2nd place, silver medalist(s)	Germany	Angelika Trabert	II	Londria 2	69.429	#	64.909		413.532
2nd place, silver medalist(s)	Germany	Steffen Zeibig	II	Waldemar 27	63.048	#	66.091	#	413.532
2nd place, silver medalist(s)	Germany	Hannelore Brenner	III	Women Of The World	71.615	#	71.440	#	413.532
3rd place, bronze medalist(s)	Norway	Jens Dokkan	Ib	Lacour	69.765	#	68.857	#	404.343
3rd place, bronze medalist(s)	Norway	Mariette Garborg	II	Luthar	65.238	#	64.182	#	404.343
3rd place, bronze medalist(s)	Norway	Ann Cathrin Lubbe	IV	Zanko	67.785	#	68.516	#	404.343
3rd place, bronze medalist(s)	Norway	Sigrid Rui	IV	Nanof	63.357		60.064		404.343
4	Denmark	Caroline Nielsen	II	Rostorn's Hatim-Tinn	65.809	#	68.182	#	401.603
4	Denmark	Annika Lykke Dalskov	III	Alfarvad April Z	69.538	#	71.040	#	401.603
4	Denmark	Line Thorning Joergensen	IV	Colani-Star	65.357	#	61.677	#	401.603
4	Denmark	Henrik Sibbesen	IV	Lock Fight	60.786		WD		401.603
5	Netherlands	Petra van de Sande	II	Toscane	60.381		66.909	#	394.950
5	Netherlands	Ineke de Groot	IV	Indo	66.428	#	63.161	#	394.950
5	Netherlands	Sabine Peters	IV	Donna D.M.	64.500	#	62.516		394.950
5	Netherlands	Sjerstin Vermeulen	IV	Sultano	67.500	#	66.452	#	394.950
6	Australia	Grace Bowman	Ib	Yv Mt Batton	58.235		56.286		388.092
6	Australia	Nicole Kullen	Ib	Nomination	60.235	#	59.905	#	388.092
6	Australia	Sharon Jarvis	III	Odorado	62.923	#	69.200	#	388.092
6	Australia	Georgia Bruce	IV	V Salute	67.571	#	68.258	#	388.092
7	Canada	Ashley Gowanlock	Ib	Donnymaskell	63.059	#	63.714	#	385.010
7	Canada	Lauren Barwick	II	Maile	67.619	#	68.454	#	385.010
7	Canada	Jennifer McKenzie	II	Valentine II	57.047		56.818		385.010
7	Canada	Eleonore Elstone	IV	Lutke	62.357	#	59.807	#	385.010
8	Italy	Mauro Caredda	Ia	Garfielt	62.471	#	55.800	#	379.903
8	Italy	Andrea Vigon	Ia	Priool	66.118	#	63.800	#	379.903
8	Italy	Silvia Veratti	III	Balla Coi Lupi	67.154	#	64.560	#	379.903
9	Sweden	Carolin Rutberg	II	Weltini	64.667	#	65.182	#	373.736
9	Sweden	Gabriella Lof	III	Oleander	60.231	#	56.960	#	373.736
9	Sweden	Lotten Aronsson	IV	Busy Lizzie	61.857	#	64.839	#	373.736
10	United States	Lynn Seidemann	Ib	Rhett	64.471	#	63.905	#	369.272
10	United States	Rebecca Hart	II	Norteassa	62.000	#	62.545	#	369.272
10	United States	Barbara Grassmyer	III	Mibis	59.231	#	57.120	#	369.272
10	United States	Robin Brueckmann	IV	Radetzky	59.214		56.387		369.272
11	Brazil	Sergio Oliva	Ia	Neho De La Jonchere	52.353	#	60.900	#	364.405
11	Brazil	Marcos Alves	Ib	Luthenay De Vernay	62.823	#	67.714	#	364.405
11	Brazil	Davi Mesquita	Ib	Neho De La Jonchere	44.941		56.952		364.405
11	Brazil	Elisa Melaranci	II	Lester	61.524	#	59.091	#	364.405
12	South Africa	Mark Frenzel	Ia	Waldfee 697	48.706	#	52.100	#	352.948
12	South Africa	Marion Milne	Ib	Waldfee 697	54.471	#	58.095	#	352.948
12	South Africa	Kerry Noble	II	De Vito	48.667		51.909		352.948
12	South Africa	Philippa Johnson	IV	Benedict	70.286	#	69.290	#	352.948

== Team Test - Grade Ia ==
The Grade Ia Team Test was ridden on 7 September at 20:42.

Juror at E: Anne Prain ( France); H: Kjell Myhre ( Norway); C: Alison Mastin ( Ireland); M: Tarja Huttunen ( Finland); B: Hanneke Gerritsen ( Netherlands).

Rank	Rider	Horse	Percentage score (and rank)					Total % score
Rank	Rider	Horse	E	H	C	M	B	Total % score
1	Anne Dunham (GBR)	Teddy	78.235 (1)	72.353 (2)	77.647 (1)	74.706 (1)	72.941 (1)	75.176
2	Sophie Christiansen (GBR)	Lambrusco III	75.294 (2)	74.118 (1)	70.588 (2)	72.353 (2)	67.647 (2)	72.000
3	Andrea Vigon (ITA)	Priool	70.000 (3)	68.824 (3)	68.824 (3)	65.294 (3)	57.647 (4)	66.118
4	Mauro Caredda (ITA)	Garfielt	64.118 (4)	61.176 (4)	62.353 (4)	62.353 (4)	62.353 (3)	62.471
5	Sergio Oliva (BRA)	Neho De La Jonchere	51.765 (5)	50.588 (5)	52.353 (5)	51.176 (5)	55.882 (5)	52.353
6	Mark Frenzel (RSA)	Waldfee 697	48.235 (6)	48.824 (6)	50.588 (6)	45.882 (6)	50.000 (6)	48.706

== Team Test - Grade Ib ==
The Grade Ib Team Test was ridden on 7 September at 19:15.

Juror at E: Tarja Huttunen ( Finland); H: Hanneke Gerritsen ( Netherlands); C: Liliana Iannone ( Argentina); M: Janet Geary ( Australia); B: Gudrun Hofinga ( Germany).

Rank	Rider	Horse	Percentage score (and rank)					Total % score
Rank	Rider	Horse	E	H	C	M	B	Total % score
1	Lee Pearson (GBR)	Gentlemen	73.529 (1)	72.353 (1)	75.882 (1)	72.941 (1)	71.765 (1)	73.294
2	Jens Dokkan (NOR)	Lacour	68.235 (2)	68.824 (2)	72.941 (2)	69.412 (2)	69.412 (2)	69.765
3	Lynn Seidemann (USA)	Rhett	64.706 (3)	62.941 (3)	67.059 (4)	62.353 (5)	65.294 (3)	64.471
4	Ashley Gowanlock (CAN)	Donnymaskell	58.824 (5)	62.941 (3)	67.059 (3)	64.118 (3)	62.353 (4)	63.059
5	Marcos Alves (BRA)	Luthenay De Vernay	63.529 (4)	62.941 (3)	65.882 (5)	60.000 (6)	61.765 (5)	62.823
6	Nicole Kullen (AUS)	Nomination	58.235 (6)	61.176 (6)	64.118 (6)	58.824 (7)	58.824 (6)	60.235
7	Grace Bowman (AUS)	Yv Mt Batton	55.882 (7)	55.294 (8)	60.000 (7)	63.529 (4)	56.471 (7)	58.235
8	Marion Milne (RSA)	Waldfee 697	50.588 (8)	55.882 (7)	58.824 (8)	52.353 (8)	54.706 (8)	54.471
9	Davi Mesquita (BRA)	Neho De La Jonchere	43.529 (9)	45.294 (9)	48.824 (9)	45.294 (9)	41.765 (9)	44.941

== Team Test - Grade II ==
The Grade II Team Test was ridden on 7 September at 08:41.

Juror at E: Janet Geary ( Australia); H: Gudrun Hofinga ( Germany); C: Anne Prain ( France); M: Kjell Myhre ( Norway); B: Alison Mastin ( Ireland).

Rank	Rider	Horse	Percentage score (and rank)					Total % score
Rank	Rider	Horse	E	H	C	M	B	Total % score
1	Angelika Trabert (GER)	Londria 2	66.667 (2)	69.048 (1)	69.048 (1)	72.857 (1)	69.524 (1)	69.429
2	Lauren Barwick (CAN)	Maile	68.095 (1)	65.238 (2)	67.143 (2)	69.048 (2)	68.571 (2)	67.619
3	Caroline Nielsen (DEN)	Rostorn's Hatim-Tinn	66.667 (2)	65.238 (2)	65.714 (4)	65.714 (3)	65.714 (4)	65.809
4	Mariette Garborg (NOR)	Luthar	65.238 (4)	63.333 (5)	65.714 (4)	65.238 (4)	66.667 (3)	65.238
5	Carolin Rutberg (SWE)	Weltini	63.333 (6)	62.857 (7)	66.667 (3)	65.238 (4)	65.238 (5)	64.667
6	Steffen Zeibig (GER)	Waldemar 27	62.857 (7)	64.286 (4)	63.333 (6)	60.952 (10)	63.810 (6)	63.048
7	Britta Naepel (GER)	Cherubin 15	63.810 (5)	63.333 (5)	58.571 (11)	64.762 (6)	62.857 (7)	62.667
8	Rebecca Hart (USA)	Norteassa	62.381 (8)	60.952 (9)	59.524 (10)	64.762 (6)	62.381 (8)	62.000
9	Elisa Melaranci (BRA)	Lester	59.524 (9)	61.429 (8)	61.429 (7)	63.333 (8)	61.905 (9)	61.524
10	Petra van de Sande (NED)	Toscane	57.619 (10)	60.476 (10)	60.000 (8)	62.381 (9)	61.429 (10)	60.381
11	Jennifer McKenzie (CAN)	Valentine II	56.190 (11)	56.190 (11)	60.000 (8)	58.095 (11)	54.762 (11)	57.047
12	Kerry Noble (RSA)	De Vito	47.143 (12)	46.190 (12)	51.905 (12)	47.143 (12)	50.952 (12)	48.667

== Team Test - Grade III ==
The Grade III Team Test was ridden on 7 September at 07:30.

Juror at E: Kjell Myhre ( Norway); H: Alison Mastin ( Ireland); C: Tarja Huttunen ( Finland); M: Hanneke Gerritsen ( Netherlands); B: Liliana Iannone ( Argentina).

Rank	Rider	Horse	Percentage score (and rank)					Total % score
Rank	Rider	Horse	E	H	C	M	B	Total % score
1	Hannelore Brenner (GER)	Women Of The World	71.538 (1)	72.692 (1)	73.462 (1)	70.769 (1)	69.615 (1)	71.615
2	Simon Laurens (GBR)	Ocean Diamond	70.000 (2)	69.615 (3)	71.154 (2)	67.308 (3)	69.615 (1)	69.538
3	Annika Lykke Dalskov (DEN)	Alfarvad April Z	70.000 (2)	71.923 (2)	70.769 (3)	67.308 (3)	67.692 (3)	69.538
4	Silvia Veratti (ITA)	Balla Coi Lupi	67.308 (4)	66.923 (4)	68.462 (4)	67.692 (2)	65.385 (5)	67.154
5	Sharon Jarvis (AUS)	Odorado	61.923 (5)	60.769 (6)	64.231 (5)	61.154 (5)	66.538 (4)	62.923
6	Gabriella Lof (SWE)	Oleander	59.615 (7)	61.154 (5)	61.923 (6)	58.846 (6)	59.615 (6)	60.231
7	Barbara Grassmyer (USA)	Mibis	60.385 (6)	60.385 (7)	57.692 (7)	58.462 (7)	59.231 (7)	59.231

== Team Test - Grade IV ==
The Grade IV Team Test was ridden on 7 September at 22:15.

Juror at E: Liliana Iannone ( Argentina); H: Janet Geary ( Australia); C: Gudrun Hofinga ( Germany); M: Anne Prain ( France); B: Kjell Myhre ( Norway).

Rank	Rider	Horse	Percentage score (and rank)					Total % score
Rank	Rider	Horse	E	H	C	M	B	Total % score
1	Philippa Johnson (RSA)	Benedict	71.071 (1)	69.286 (1)	67.500 (3)	72.500 (1)	71.071 (1)	70.286
2	Ann Cathrin Lubbe (NOR)	Zanko	67.500 (3)	68.571 (3)	68.571 (1)	65.714 (6)	68.571 (2)	67.785
3	Georgia Bruce (AUS)	V Salute	67.143 (5)	69.286 (1)	68.571 (1)	67.500 (3)	65.357 (7)	67.571
4	Sjerstin Vermeulen (NED)	Sultano	69.643 (2)	66.429 (4)	65.714 (5)	70.000 (2)	65.714 (5)	67.500
5	Ineke de Groot (NED)	Indo	67.500 (3)	65.357 (5)	66.071 (4)	66.071 (5)	67.143 (3)	66.428
6	Line Thorning Joergensen (DEN)	Colani-Star	64.286 (7)	63.929 (7)	65.357 (6)	66.786 (4)	66.429 (4)	65.357
7	Sabine Peters (NED)	Donna D.M.	66.429 (6)	65.000 (6)	62.500 (9)	62.857 (9)	65.714 (5)	64.500
8	Sigrid Rui (NOR)	Nanof	62.857 (8)	62.143 (8)	64.286 (7)	63.929 (7)	63.571 (10)	63.357
9	Eleonore Elstone (CAN)	Lutke	61.786 (10)	60.357 (10)	63.214 (8)	62.857 (9)	63.571 (10)	62.357
10	Lotten Aronsson (SWE)	Busy Lizzie	58.571 (11)	60.714 (9)	61.786 (10)	63.929 (7)	64.286 (8)	61.857
11	Henrik Sibbesen (DEN)	Lock Fight	62.857 (8)	57.143 (12)	58.571 (12)	61.071 (11)	64.286 (8)	60.786
12	Robin Brueckmann (USA)	Radetzky	58.571 (11)	58.571 (11)	59.643 (11)	59.286 (12)	60.000 (12)	59.214
