= Athletics at the 2008 Summer Paralympics – Men's discus throw F44 =

The Men's Discus Throw F44 had its Final held on September 15 at 17:40.

== Medalists ==
Gold	Jeremy Campbell; United States
Silver	Jackie Christiansen; Denmark
Bronze	Daniel Greaves; Great Britain

== Results ==
Place	Athlete	1	2	3	4	5	6	Best	Points
1	Jeremy Campbell (USA)	x	39.22	50.75	x	x	55.08	55.08	1019
2	Jackie Christiansen (DEN)	49.55	53.50	52.99	53.69	x	53.26	53.69	993
3	Daniel Greaves (GBR)	51.04	51.59	53.04	51.59	52.97	51.89	53.04	981
4	Farzad Sepahvand (IRI)	47.90	47.68	46.27	49.81	51.23	49.57	51.23	948
5	Paul Raison (AUS)	48.00	x	42.61	49.77	x	x	49.77	921
6	Jeff Skiba (USA)	45.72	43.62	x	47.75	x	48.72	48.72	901
7	Georgios Pappas (GRE)	40.26	44.76	44.16	44.25	44.84	43.49	44.84	830
8	Silao Ha (CHN)	x	41.63	42.80	x	40.68	x	42.80	792
9	Marco Aurélio Borges (BRA)	41.53	x	x				41.53	768
10	Gerdan Fonseca (CUB)	x	40.79	41.26				41.26	763
11	Maksym Solyankin (UKR)	35.60	x	35.09				35.60	659
