= Athletics at the 2004 Summer Paralympics – Men's shot put F42–46 =

Men's shot put events for amputee athletes were held at the 2004 Summer Paralympics in the Athens Olympic Stadium. Events were held in two disability classes.

== F42 ==
Men's Shot Put F42 at the XII Paralympic Games
- Venue: Athens Olympic Stadium
- Dates: 19 September 2004
- Competitors: 11 from 10 nations
- Winning distance: 13.81

Medalists
1st place, gold medalist(s)		Fanie Lombaard	South Africa
2nd place, silver medalist(s)		Viktar Khilmonchyk	Belarus
3rd place, bronze medalist(s)		Mehrdad Karam	Iran

The F42 event was won by Fanie Lombaard, representing South Africa.

19 September 2004, 17:15

Rank	Athlete	Result	Notes
1st place, gold medalist(s)	Fanie Lombaard (RSA)	13.81	WR
2nd place, silver medalist(s)	Viktar Khilmonchyk (BLR)	13.19	
3rd place, bronze medalist(s)	Mehrdad Karam (IRI)	12.90	
4	Athanasios Deligiorgis (GRE)	12.42	
5	Farhad Raiga (IRI)	12.37	
6	Gino de Keersmaeker (BEL)	11.93	
7	Pasilione Tafilagi (FRA)	11.44	
8	Dechko Ovcharov (BUL)	10.71	
9	Singh Surjeet (IND)	10.70	
10	Bahruz Bashirov (AZE)	10.06	
11	Chen Chia Hsiang (TPE)	7.59	

== F44/46 ==
Men's Shot Put F44/46 at the XII Paralympic Games
- Venue: Athens Olympic Stadium
- Dates: 24 September 2004
- Competitors: 19 from 14 nations
- Winning distance: 15.74

Medalists
1st place, gold medalist(s)		Jackie Christiansen	Denmark
2nd place, silver medalist(s)		Edwin Cockrell	United States
3rd place, bronze medalist(s)		Gerdán Fonseca	Cuba

The F44/46 event was won by Jackie Christiansen, representing Denmark.

24 September 2004, 17:00

Rank	Athlete	Result	Points	Notes
1st place, gold medalist(s)	Jackie Christiansen (DEN)	15.74	1083	WR
2nd place, silver medalist(s)	Edwin Cockrell (USA)	14.81	1019	
3rd place, bronze medalist(s)	Gerdán Fonseca (CUB)	14.76	1016	
4	Jörg Frischmann (GER)	14.48	996	
5	Georgios Pappas (GRE)	14.27	982	
6	Seyed Mousavi (IRI)	13.52	930	
7	Gong Xiu Feng (CHN)	14.31	914	WR
8	Miltiadis Kyriakidis (GRE)	13.26	912	
9	Urs Kolly (SUI)	12.65	870	
10	Andis Ozolnieks (LAT)	13.59	868	
11	Halid Mekic (BIH)	12.43	855	
12	Don Elgin (AUS)	12.19	839	
13	Ha Si Lao (CHN)	11.71	806	
14	Yadvendra Vashishta (IND)	10.71	737	
15	Muhammad Adeel (PAK)	7.58	521	
16	Shafique Muhammad (PAK)	6.74	430	
17	Noor Alam (PAK)	6.14	422	
	Dietmar Schmee (AUT)	DNS		
	Roderick Green (USA)	DNS		
