= Equestrian events at the 2004 Summer Paralympics =

Equestrian at the XII Paralympic Games
- Paralympic Equestrian
- Venue: Markopoulo Olympic Equestrian Centre
- Dates: 21–26 September 2004
- Competitors: 69 from 29 nations

Equestrian events at the 2004 Summer Paralympics at the Markopoulo Olympic Equestrian Centre were competed in the dressage discipline only. There were four grades of rider disability:

- Grade I - Mainly wheelchair users with poor trunk balance and or impairment of function in all four limbs, or no trunk balance and good upper limb function, or moderate trunk balance with severe impairment of all four limbs.
- Grade II - Mainly wheelchair users, or those with severe locomotor impairment involving the trunk and with good to mild upper limb function, or severe unilateral impairment.
- Grade III - Usually able to walk without support. Moderate unilateral impairment, or moderate impairment in four limbs, severe arm impairment. May need a wheelchair for longer distances or due to lack of stamina. Total loss of sight in both eyes, or intellectually impaired. Profile 36 riders were required to wear blacked out glasses or a blindfold.
- Grade IV - Impairment in one or two limbs, or some visual impairment.

Men and women competed together, and the horses were also declared medal winners.

== Participating countries ==
- Argentina (1)
- Australia (4)
- Austria (1)
- Belgium (2)
- Bermuda (2)
- Brazil (1)
- Canada (4)
- Croatia (2)
- Denmark (4)
- France (3)
- Germany (5)
- Great Britain (7)
- Greece (1)
- Hungary (1)
- Ireland (1)
- Israel (3)
- Italy (1)
- Japan (1)
- Netherlands (3)
- New Zealand (1)
- Norway (5)
- Peru (1)
- Poland (1)
- Portugal (1)
- Russia (2)
- South Africa (2)
- Sweden (4)
- Switzerland (1)
- United States (4)

== Officials ==
Appointment of officials is as follows:

Dressage

- (France) Kathy Amos-Jacob (Ground Jury President)
- (Australia) Mary Longden (Ground Jury Member)
- (United Kingdom) Jane Goldsmith (Ground Jury Member)
- (Germany) Inga Holdt-Mencke (Ground Jury Member)
- (Denmark) Evan-Bach Joergensen (Ground Jury Member)
- (United Kingdom) Jonquil Solt (Technical Delegate)

== Medal table ==
Rank	Nation	Gold	Silver	Bronze	Total
1	Great Britain (GBR)	5	0	3	8
2	Norway (NOR)	2	0	0	2
2	Sweden (SWE)	2	0	0	2
4	Germany (GER)	0	4	1	5
5	South Africa (RSA)	0	2	0	2
6	Netherlands (NED)	0	1	2	3
7	Australia (AUS)	0	1	1	2
8	United States (USA)	0	1	0	1
9	Canada (CAN)	0	0	2	2
10	Belgium (BEL)	0	0	1	1
Totals (10 entries)		9	9	10	28

=== Medal summary ===
Event	Gold	Silver	Bronze
Individual championship dressage GI	Lee Pearson on Blue Circle Boy; Great Britain	Jan Pike on Dr Doolittle; Australia	Sophie Christiansen on Hotstuff; Great Britain
Individual championship dressage GII	Irene Slaettengren on Larino; Sweden	Joop Stokkel on Pegasus; Netherlands	Gert Bolmer on Lodewijk; Netherlands (tie)
Individual championship dressage GII	Irene Slaettengren on Larino; Sweden	Joop Stokkel on Pegasus; Netherlands	Nicola Tustain on Prinz Heinrich; Great Britain (tie)
Individual championship dressage GIII	Deborah Criddle on Figaro IX; Great Britain	Bianca Vogel on Roquefort 16; Germany	Bettina Eistel on Aaron; Germany
Individual championship dressage GIV	Ann Cathrin Lubbe on Zanko; Norway	Philippa Johnson on Burgmans Benedict; South Africa	Karen Brain on Dasskara; Canada
Individual freestyle dressage GI	Lee Pearson on Blue Circle Boy; Great Britain	Lynn Seidemann on Phoenix B United States	Jan Pike on Dr Doolittle; Australia
Individual freestyle dressage GII	Irene Slaettengren on Larino; Sweden	Hannelore Brenner on Roquefort 16; Germany	Nicola Tustain on Prinz Heinrich; Great Britain
Individual freestyle dressage GIII	Deborah Criddle on Figaro IX; Great Britain	Bettina Eistel on Aaron; Germany	Bert Vermeir on Den Eik Heino; Belgium
Individual freestyle dressage GIV	Ann Cathrin Lubbe on Zanko; Norway	Philippa Johnson on Burgmans Benedict; South Africa	Karen Brain on Dasskara; Canada
Team dressage	Great Britain (GBR); Deborah Criddle/Figaro IX; Anne Dunham/Olret; Lee Pearson/Blue Circle Boy; Nicola Tustain/Prinz Heinrich	Germany (GER); Bettina Eistel/Aaron; Britta Naepel/Loverboy 9 Bianca Vogel/Roquefort 16	Netherlands (NED); Gert Bolmer/Lodewijk; Joop Stokkel/Pegasus; Sjerstin Vermeulen/Jeffrey STV

== See also ==
- Equestrian events at the 2004 Summer Olympics
