= Denmark at the 2008 Summer Paralympics =

- IPC code: DEN
- NPC: Paralympic Committee Denmark
- Website: www.paralympic.dk

in Beijing
- Competitors: 39 in 10 sports
- Flag bearer: Jackie Christiansen
- Medals Ranked 35th: Gold 3 Silver 2 Bronze 4 Total 9

Summer Paralympics appearances (overview)
- 1968; 1972; 1976; 1980; 1984; 1988; 1992; 1996; 2000; 2004; 2008; 2012; 2016; 2020; 2024

Denmark competed at the 2008 Summer Paralympics in Beijing.

== Medalists ==
Medal	Name	Sport	Event
Gold	Jackie Christiansen	Athletics	Men's shot put F44
Gold	Karina Lauridsen	Swimming	Women's 150 metre individual medley SM4
Gold	Peter Rosenmeier	Table tennis	Men's singles class 6
Silver	Jackie Christiansen	Athletics	Men's discus throw F44
Silver	Annika Lykke Dalskov	Equestrian	Individual championship test grade III
Bronze	Caroline Cecile Nielsen	Equestrian	Individual championship test grade II
Bronze	Annika Lykke Dalskov	Equestrian	Individual freestyle test grade III
Bronze	Karina Joergensen; Maria Larsen; Mette Nissen; Kamilla Ryding; Ninna Thomsen; Lykke Vedsted	Goalball	Women's team
Bronze	Karina Lauridsen	Swimming	Women's 50 metre backstroke S5

=== Athletics ===
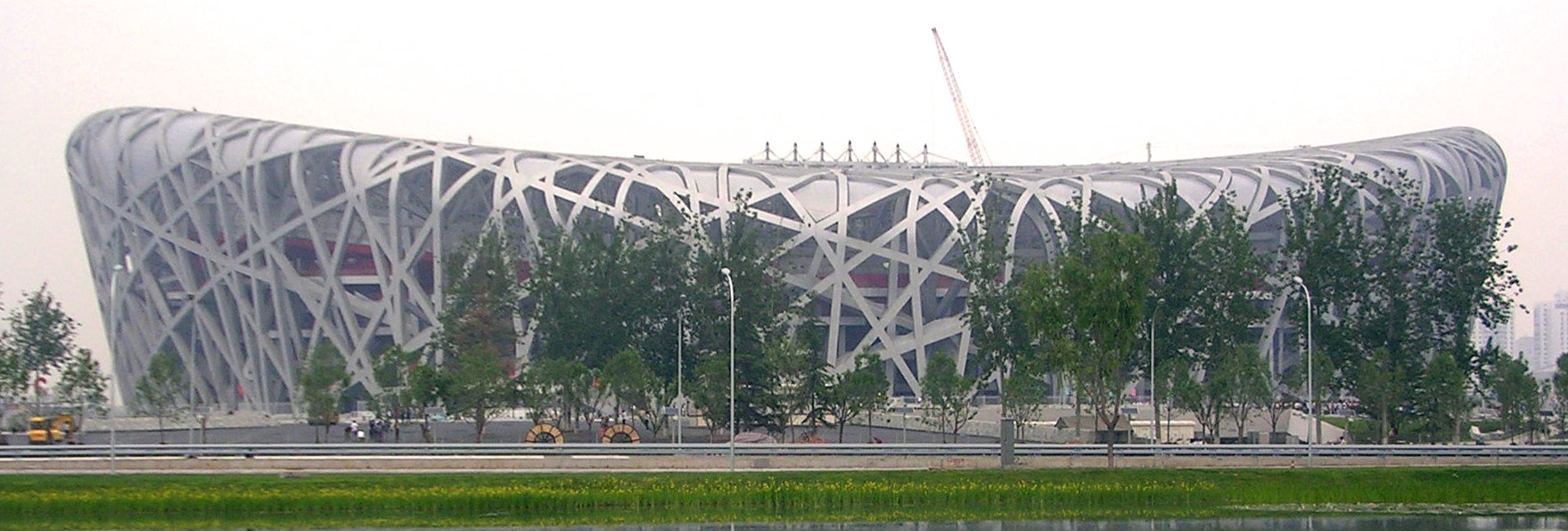

==== Men's track ====
Athlete	Class	Event	Heats		Final	
Athlete	Class	Event	Result	Rank	Result	Rank
Mikael Andersen	T11	1500m	4:15.69	3 q	4:13.90	4
Ebbe Blichfeldt	T54	1500m	3:21.16	35	did not advance	
Ebbe Blichfeldt	T54	5000m	10:57.56	25	did not advance	
Ebbe Blichfeldt	T54	Marathon	—		1:35:14	28

==== Men's field ====
Athlete	Class	Event	Final		
Athlete	Class	Event	Result	Points	Rank
Jackie Christiansen	F44	Discus throw	53.69	993	2nd place, silver medalist(s)
Jackie Christiansen	F44	Shot put	17.89 WR	1117	1st place, gold medalist(s)

=== Cycling ===
==== Men's road ====
Athlete	Event	Time	Rank
Dennis Madsen; Ryan Sørensen (pilot)	Men's road race B&VI 1-3	2:29:21	14
Dennis Madsen; Ryan Sørensen (pilot)	Men's road time trial B&VI 1-3	37:24.10	19

==== Women's road ====
Athlete	Event	Time	Rank
Marianne Maibøll	Women's road race HC A/B/C	1:34:58	10
Marianne Maibøll	Women's road time trial HC A/B/C	32:27.95	11

=== Equestrian ===
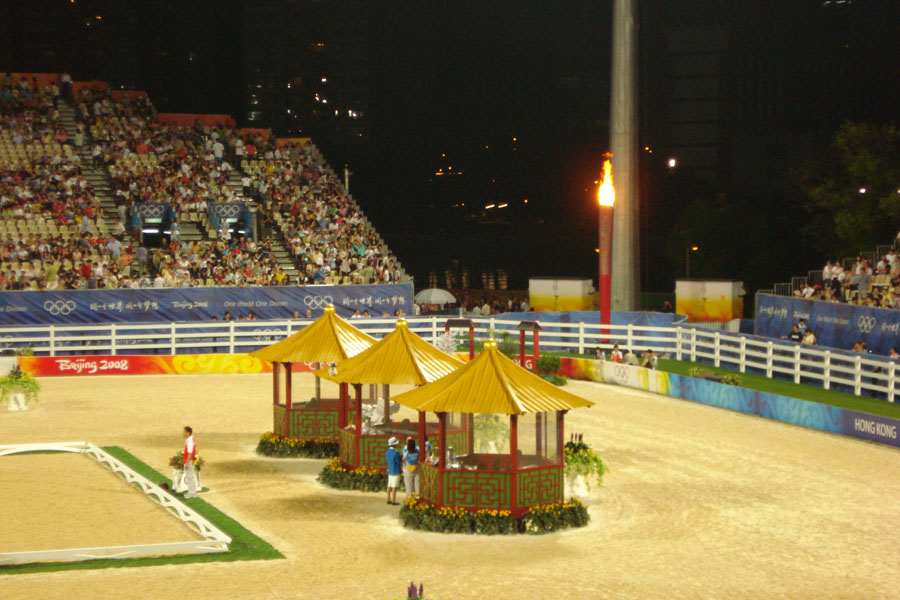

==== Individual events ====
Athlete	Horse	Event	Total	
Athlete	Horse	Event	Score	Rank
Annika Lykke Dalskov	Alfarvad April Z	Mixed individual championship test grade III	71.040	2nd place, silver medalist(s)
Annika Lykke Dalskov	Alfarvad April Z	Mixed freestyle test grade III	73.222	3rd place, bronze medalist(s)
Line Thorning Jørgensen	Colani-Star	Mixed individual championship test grade IV	61.677	9
Line Thorning Jørgensen	Colani-Star	Mixed individual freestyle test grade IV	66.045	8
Caroline Nielsen	Rostorn's Hatim-Tin	Mixed individual championship test grade II	68.182	3rd place, bronze medalist(s)
Caroline Nielsen	Rostorn's Hatim-Tin	Mixed freestyle test grade II	65.611	9
Henrik Sibbesen	Lock Fight	Mixed individual championship test grade IV	DNS	

==== Team ====
Athlete	Horse	Event	Individual score			Total	
Athlete	Horse	Event	TT	CT	Total	Score	Rank
Annika Lykke Dalskov	See above	Team	69.538	71.040	140.578*	401.603	4
Line Thorning Jørgensen	See above	Team	65.357	61.677	127.034*	401.603	4
Caroline Nielsen	See above	Team	65.809	68.182	133.991*	401.603	4
Henrik Sibbesen	See above	Team	60.786	Withdrawn	60.786	401.603	4

* - denotes individual score counted towards total score.

=== Goalball ===
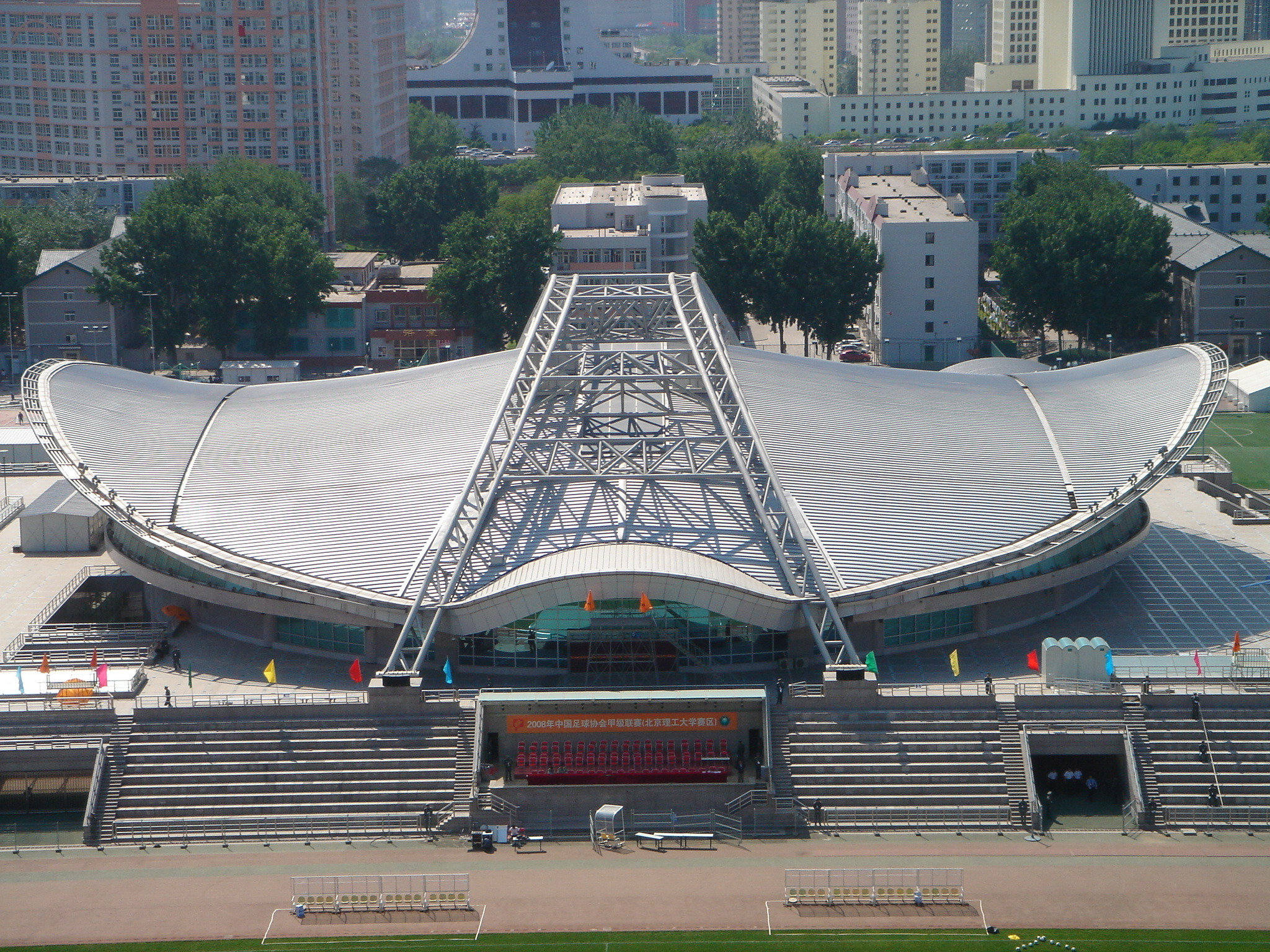

==== Men's team ====
The men's team didn't win any medals, they were 6th out of 12 teams.

Players

- Mads Brix Baulund
- Jonas Elkjær
- Kenneth Hansen
- Ricky Nielsen
- Martin Enggaard Pedersen
- Peter Weichel

Tournament

7 September 2008

Denmark	2 - 2	Spain

Beijing Institute of Technology Gymnasium
8 September 2008

Slovenia	4 - 2	Denmark

Beijing Institute of Technology Gymnasium
9 September 2008

Denmark	11 - 4	Finland

Beijing Institute of Technology Gymnasium
10 September 2008

Lithuania	10 - 1	Denmark

Beijing Institute of Technology Gymnasium
11 September 2008

Denmark	13 - 6	Belgium

Beijing Institute of Technology Gymnasium

Quarterfinals

12 September 2008

Sweden	4 - 2	Denmark

Beijing Institute of Technology Gymnasium

5-8th classification

13 September 2008

Denmark	6 - 4	Slovenia

Beijing Institute of Technology Gymnasium

5/6th classification

14 September 2008

Canada	8 - 5	Denmark

Beijing Institute of Technology Gymnasium

==== Women's team ====
The women's team won the bronze medal after defeating Sweden.

Players

- Karina Jørgensen
- Maria Larsen
- Mette Præstegaard Nissen
- Kamilla Bradt Ryding
- Ninna Marie Thomsen
- Lykke Vedsted

Tournament

7 September 2008

Denmark	4 - 1	Germany

Beijing Institute of Technology Gymnasium
8 September 2008

United States	2 - 0	Denmark

Beijing Institute of Technology Gymnasium
9 September 2008

Denmark	2 - 1	Sweden

Beijing Institute of Technology Gymnasium
10 September 2008

Japan	1 - 2	Denmark

Beijing Institute of Technology Gymnasium
11 September 2008

Denmark	2 - 2	Canada

Beijing Institute of Technology Gymnasium
12 September 2008

China	0 – 0	Denmark

Beijing Institute of Technology Gymnasium
13 September 2008

Denmark	3 - 2	Brazil

Beijing Institute of Technology Gymnasium

Semifinals

14 September 2008

United States	4 - 3	Denmark

Beijing Institute of Technology Gymnasium

Bronze medal match

15 September 2008

Denmark	3 - 2	Sweden

Beijing Institute of Technology Gymnasium

=== Rowing ===
Athlete	Event	Heats		Repechage		Final	
Athlete	Event	Time	Rank	Time	Rank	Time	Rank
Lin Gjerding; Kenneth Kronborg; Anders Olsen; Margit Pedersen; Lene van der Keur	Mixed coxed four	4:04.71	12 R	3:56.80	8 FB	3:59.73	5

=== Sailing ===
Athlete	Event	Race										Total points	Net points Total	Rank
Athlete	Event	1	2	3	4	5	6	7	8	9	10	Total points	Net points Total	Rank
Jens Als Andersen	2.4mR	(9)	7	6	1	2	6	3	5	(9)	9	57	39	6

=== Shooting ===
==== Men ====
Athlete	Event	Qualification		Final		
Athlete	Event	Score	Rank	Score	Total	Rank
Johnny Andersen	Mixed 10m air rifle prone SH2	599	5 Q	104.8	703.8	7
Johnny Andersen	Mixed 10m air rifle standing SH2	595	14	did not advance		
Kazimierz Mechula	Men's 10m air rifle standing SH1	574	21	did not advance		

==== Women ====
Athlete	Event	Qualification		Final		
Athlete	Event	Score	Rank	Score	Total	Rank
Lone Overbye	Mixed 10m air rifle prone SH2	597	15	did not advance		
Lone Overbye	Mixed 10m air rifle standing SH2	588	20	did not advance		

=== Swimming ===
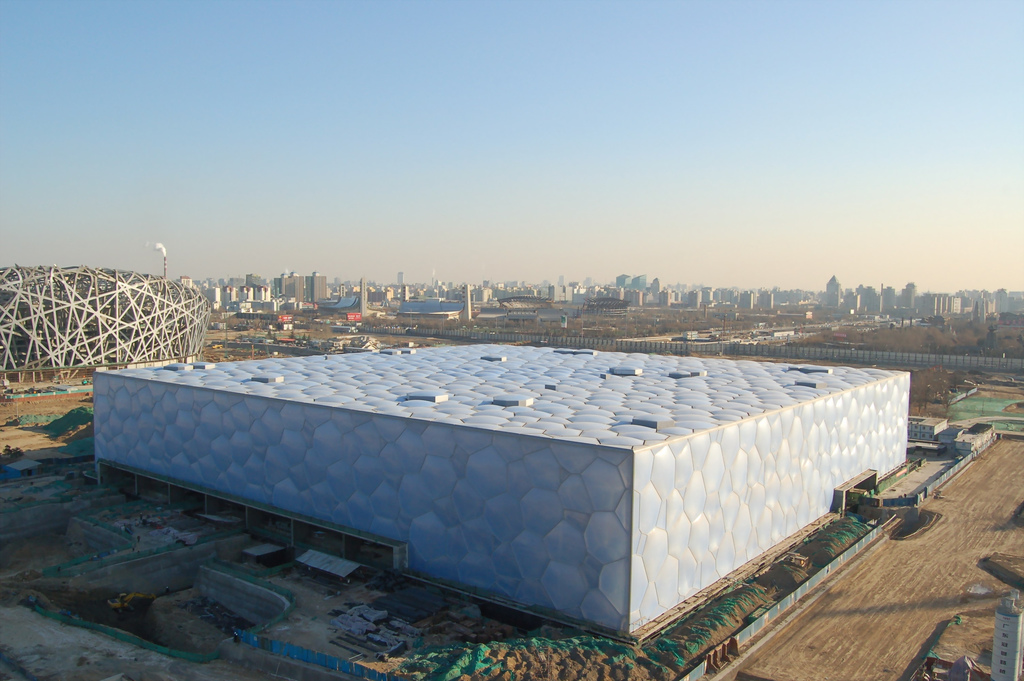

==== Men ====
Athlete	Class	Event	Heats		Final	
Athlete	Class	Event	Result	Rank	Result	Rank
Christian Bundgaard	SB11	100m breaststroke	1:17.37	3 Q	1:16.38	4
Christian Thomsen	S9	50m freestyle	27.50	16	did not advance	
Christian Thomsen	S9	100m freestyle	59.99	19	did not advance	

==== Women ====
Athlete	Class	Event	Heats		Final	
Athlete	Class	Event	Result	Rank	Result	Rank
Cecilie Kristiansen	S4	50m freestyle	—		1:04.48	7
Cecilie Kristiansen	S4	100m freestyle	2:22.42	9	did not advance	
Karina Lauridsen	S5	50m backstroke	45.12	3 Q	45.72	3rd place, bronze medalist(s)
Karina Lauridsen	S5	50m freestyle	44.90	8 Q	44.69	7
Karina Lauridsen	S6	100m backstroke	1:33.63	4 Q	1:34.41	5
Karina Lauridsen	SM4	150m individual medley	—		2:47.84 WR	1st place, gold medalist(s)

=== Table tennis ===
Athlete	Event	Preliminaries				Round of 16	Quarterfinals	Semifinals	Final / BM	
Athlete	Event	Opposition Result	Opposition Result	Opposition Result	Rank	Opposition Result	Opposition Result	Opposition Result	Opposition Result	Rank
Lars Hansen	Men's singles C2	Revucky (SVK); W 3–1	Vilsmaier (GER); W 3–0	Kovalski (BRA); W 3–0	1 Q	—		Molliens (FRA); L 1–3	Kim K-m (KOR); L 1-3	4
Michal Jensen	Men's singles C6	Blok (NED); L 2-3	Thainiyom (THA); W 3-1	Itkonen (SWE); W 3-1	2	did not advance				
Peter Rosenmeier	Men's singles C6	Buzin (RUS); W 3-1	P du Plooy (RSA); W 3-0	Arguello Garcia (CRC); W 3-0	1 Q	—		Schmidt (GER); W 3-2	Arnold (GER); W 3-1	1st place, gold medalist(s)
Michal Jensen; Peter Rosenmeier	Men's team C6-8	—				Poland (POL); L 1-3	did not advance			

=== Wheelchair tennis ===
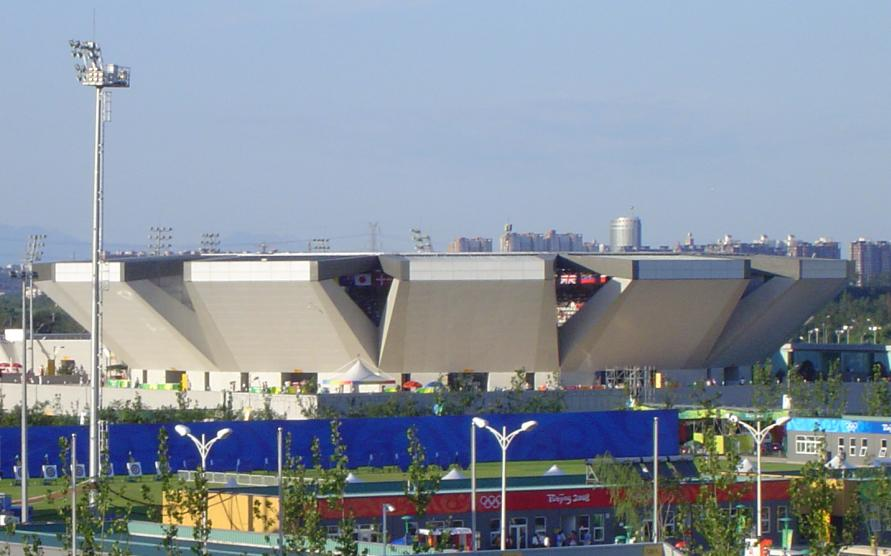

==== Men ====
Athlete	Event	Round of 64	Round of 32	Round of 16	Quarterfinals	Semifinals	Finals
Athlete	Event	Opposition Result	Opposition Result	Opposition Result	Opposition Result	Opposition Result	Opposition Result
Kenneth Kammersgaard	Men's singles	Rajakaruna (SRI); L 1-6, 1-6	did not advance				

== See also ==
- 2008 Summer Paralympics
- Denmark at the Paralympics
- Denmark at the 2008 Summer Olympics
