= Norway at the 2004 Summer Paralympics =

- IPC code: NOR
- NPC: Norwegian Olympic and Paralympic Committee and Confederation of Sports
- Website: www.idrett.no (in Norwegian)

in Athens
- Competitors: 34 in 8 sports
- Medals Ranked 38th: Gold 3 Silver 1 Bronze 1 Total 5

Summer Paralympics appearances (overview)
- 1960; 1964; 1968; 1972; 1976; 1980; 1984; 1988; 1992; 1996; 2000; 2004; 2008; 2012; 2016; 2020; 2024

Norway competed at the 2004 Summer Paralympics in Athens, Greece. The team included 34 athletes—21 men and 13 women. Norwegian competitors won five medals at the Games, three gold, one silver and one bronze, to finish joint 38th in the medal table.

== Medallists ==
Medal	Name	Sport	Event
Gold	Ann Cathrin Lubbe	Equestrian	Mixed individual championship dressage grade IV
Gold	Ann Cathrin Lubbe	Equestrian	Mixed individual freestyle dressage grade IV
Gold	Cecilie Drabsch	Swimming	Women's 50m freestyle S8
Silver	Roger Aandalen	Boccia	Mixed individual BC1
Bronze	Cecilie Drabsch	Swimming	Women's 100m freestyle S8

== Sports ==
=== Athletics ===
==== Men's track ====
Athlete	Class	Event	Heats		Semifinal		Final	
Athlete	Class	Event	Result	Rank	Result	Rank	Result	Rank
Mikkel Gaarder	T52	Marathon	N/A				3:54:32	6
Joerund Gaasemyr	T11	Marathon	N/A				3:22:41	9
Oeivind Sletten	T54	Marathon	N/A				1:54:37	26

==== Men's field ====
Athlete	Class	Event	Final		
Athlete	Class	Event	Result	Points	Rank
Runar Steinstad	F42	Javelin	44.58	-	6

==== Women's field ====
Athlete	Class	Event	Final		
Athlete	Class	Event	Result	Points	Rank
Elin Holen	F42	Long jump	3.29	-	6

=== Boccia ===
Athlete	Event	Preliminaries			Quarterfinals	Semifinals	Final	
Athlete	Event	Opponent	Opposition Score	Rank	Opposition Score	Opposition Score	Opposition Score	Rank
Roger Aandalen	Mixed individual BC1	Padtong (THA)	L 2-3	2 Q	Beltran (ESP); W 3-2	Grossmayer (AUT); W 4-3	Fernandez (POR); L 2-4	2nd place, silver medalist(s)
Roger Aandalen	Mixed individual BC1	Bak-Pedersen (DEN)	W 6-5	2 Q	Beltran (ESP); W 3-2	Grossmayer (AUT); W 4-3	Fernandez (POR); L 2-4	2nd place, silver medalist(s)
Roger Aandalen	Mixed individual BC1	Leung (HKG)	W 5-4	2 Q	Beltran (ESP); W 3-2	Grossmayer (AUT); W 4-3	Fernandez (POR); L 2-4	2nd place, silver medalist(s)
Roger Aandalen	Mixed individual BC1	Marques (POR)	W 8-4	2 Q	Beltran (ESP); W 3-2	Grossmayer (AUT); W 4-3	Fernandez (POR); L 2-4	2nd place, silver medalist(s)
Roger Aandalen	Mixed individual BC1	Wilhelmsen (NOR)	W 8-4	2 Q	Beltran (ESP); W 3-2	Grossmayer (AUT); W 4-3	Fernandez (POR); L 2-4	2nd place, silver medalist(s)
Elisabeth Wilhelmsen	Mixed individual BC1	Padtong (THA)	L 0-14	6	did not advance			
Elisabeth Wilhelmsen	Mixed individual BC1	Aandalen (NOR)	L 4-8	6	did not advance			
Elisabeth Wilhelmsen	Mixed individual BC1	Bak-Pedersen (DEN)	L 2-9	6	did not advance			
Elisabeth Wilhelmsen	Mixed individual BC1	Leung (HKG)	L 1-6	6	did not advance			
Elisabeth Wilhelmsen	Mixed individual BC1	Marques (POR)	L 0-11	6	did not advance			
Roar Femtegield	Mixed individual BC2	Murray (GBR)	L 0-5	3	did not advance			
Roar Femtegield	Mixed individual BC2	Hayes (IRL)	L 4-5	3	did not advance			
Roar Femtegield	Mixed individual BC2	Tsililkopoulou (GRE)	W 5-2	3	did not advance			
Alf Reidar Olsen	Mixed individual BC2	Silva (POR)	L 0-11	4	did not advance			
Alf Reidar Olsen	Mixed individual BC2	McLeod (CAN)	L 2-3	4	did not advance			
Alf Reidar Olsen	Mixed individual BC2	Maleemao (THA)	L 0-16	4	did not advance			
Roger Aandalen; Roar Femtegield; Alf Reidar Olsen; Elisabeth Wilhelmsen	Mixed team BC1-2	Spain (ESP)	L 0-14	6	did not advance			
Roger Aandalen; Roar Femtegield; Alf Reidar Olsen; Elisabeth Wilhelmsen	Mixed team BC1-2	Great Britain (GBR)	L 5-6	6	did not advance			
Roger Aandalen; Roar Femtegield; Alf Reidar Olsen; Elisabeth Wilhelmsen	Mixed team BC1-2	Austria (AUT)	L 0-13	6	did not advance			
Roger Aandalen; Roar Femtegield; Alf Reidar Olsen; Elisabeth Wilhelmsen	Mixed team BC1-2	Argentina (ARG)	W 7-6	6	did not advance			
Roger Aandalen; Roar Femtegield; Alf Reidar Olsen; Elisabeth Wilhelmsen	Mixed team BC1-2	Canada (CAN)	L 5-6	6	did not advance			

=== Cycling ===
==== Men's road ====
Athlete	Event	Time	Rank
Morten Jahr	Men's road race/time trial LC2	2:19:59	7
Lars Kristian Johnsen; Mattis Eriksen (pilot)	Men's road race/time trial tandem B1-3	-	15

==== Men's track ====
Athlete	Event	Qualification		1st round		Final	
Athlete	Event	Time	Rank	Time	Rank	Opposition Time	Rank
Morten Jahr	Men's individual pursuit LC2	5:31.26	6 Q	Martin (USA); L 5:23.08	6	did not advance	
Terje Tho; Mattis Eriksen (pilot)	Men's individual pursuit tandem B1-3	4:39.75	9	did not advance			

==== Women's road ====
Athlete	Event	Time	Rank
Ingunn Bollerud; Tone Gravvold (pilot)	Women's road race/time trial tandem B1-3	2:00:59	4

==== Women's track ====
Athlete	Event	Qualification		1st round		Final	
Athlete	Event	Time	Rank	Time	Rank	Opposition Time	Rank
May Britt Hartwell; Tone Gravvold (pilot)	Women's 1km time trial tandem B1-3	N/A				1:13.51	5
May Britt Hartwell; Tone Gravvold (pilot)	Women's individual pursuit tandem B1-3	3:46.58	4 Q	Fuchs (GER) / Fuenfgeld (GER); W 3:44.66	2 q	Shaw (AUS) / McCombie (AUS); L 3:46.18	4

=== Equestrian ===
==== Individual events ====
Athlete	Event	Total	
Athlete	Event	Score	Rank
Jens Lasse Dokkan	Mixed individual championship test grade I	66.842	8
Jens Lasse Dokkan	Mixed individual freestyle test grade I	68.875	7
Silje Gillund	Mixed individual championship test grade III	60.960	13
Silje Gillund	Mixed individual freestyle test grade III	62.944	12
Ann Cathrin Lubbe	Mixed individual championship test grade IV	70.839	1st place, gold medalist(s)
Ann Cathrin Lubbe	Mixed individual freestyle test grade IV	80.045	1st place, gold medalist(s)
Hanne Nesheim	Mixed individual championship test grade III	65.120	7
Hanne Nesheim	Mixed individual freestyle test grade III	68.722	8
Sigrid Rui	Mixed individual championship test grade IV	63.355	11
Sigrid Rui	Mixed individual freestyle test grade IV	72.136	6

==== Team ====
Athlete	Event	Total	
Athlete	Event	Total	Rank
Jens Lasse Dokkan; Silje Gillund; Ann Cathrin Lubbe; Sigrid Rui	Team	405.900	5

=== Powerlifting ===
==== Men ====
Athlete	Event	Result	Rank
Frank Gyland	90kg	187.5	8

=== Swimming ===
==== Men ====
Athlete	Class	Event	Heats		Final	
Athlete	Class	Event	Result	Rank	Result	Rank
Stian Helgeland	S6	50m butterfly	36.95	8 Q	37.05	8
Jorgen Tadvin	S6	400m freestyle	6:06.60	10	did not advance	

==== Women ====
Athlete	Class	Event	Heats		Final	
Athlete	Class	Event	Result	Rank	Result	Rank
Cecilie Drabsch	S8	50m freestyle	32.75	2 Q	31.51 WR	1st place, gold medalist(s)
Cecilie Drabsch	S8	100m freestyle	1:13.82	5 Q	1:12.69	3rd place, bronze medalist(s)
Hilde Saeves	S7	50m freestyle	37.30	9	did not advance	
Hilde Saeves	S7	100m freestyle	1:20.79	7 Q	1:20.66	7
Hilde Saeves	S7	50m butterfly	40.63	6 Q	39.63	6
Elise Soland Olsen	S3	50m freestyle	1:14.41	4 Q	1:13.68	5
Elise Soland Olsen	S3	100m freestyle	2:45.52	6 Q	2:44.23	6
Elise Soland Olsen	S3	50m backstroke	N/A		1:14.72	4
Elise Soland Olsen	S4	50m butterfly	N/A		1:21.26	7
Mariann Vestbostad	S8	50m freestyle	34.93	6 Q	34.71	6
Mariann Vestbostad	S8	100m freestyle	1:15.80	8 Q	1:16.26	8
Mariann Vestbostad	S8	100m backstroke	1:26.47	4 Q	1:25.74	4

=== Table tennis ===
==== Men ====
Athlete	Event	Preliminaries				Quarterfinals	Semifinals	Final / BM	
Athlete	Event	Opposition Result	Opposition Result	Opposition Result	Rank	Opposition Result	Opposition Result	Opposition Result	Rank
Christian Rosnes	Men's singles 3	Kim (KOR); L 0–3	Robinson (GBR); L 0–3	Rodríguez (ESP); L 0–3	4	did not advance			
Tommy Urhaug	Men's singles 5	Rosec (FRA); W 3-2	Taus (CZE); W 3-0	N/A	1 Q	Kwong (HKG); L 2-3	did not advance		
Christian Rosnes; Tommy Urhaug	Men's team 5	France (FRA); L 1-3	Brazil (BRA); W 3-2	N/A	2 Q	South Korea (KOR); L 1-3	did not advance		

== See also ==
- Norway at the Paralympics
- Norway at the 2004 Summer Olympics
