= Athletics at the 2008 Summer Paralympics – Men's shot put F44 =

The Men's Shot Put F44 had its Final held on September 8 at 18:50.

== Medalists ==
Gold	Jackie Christiansen; Denmark
Silver	Paul Raison; Australia
Bronze	Gerdan Fonseca; Cuba

== Results ==
Place	Athlete	1	2	3	4	5	6	Best	Points
1	Jackie Christiansen (DEN)	16.24	17.89	x	x	x	16.76	17.89 WR	1117
2	Paul Raison (AUS)	15.41	14.72	12.92	14.83	14.69	15.83	15.83	988
3	Gerdan Fonseca (CUB)	14.73	15.65	14.93	15.06	15.35	15.22	15.65	977
4	Georgios Pappas (GRE)	14.66	15.03	14.39	x	14.21	x	15.03	938
5	Josip Slivar (CRO)	13.50	14.12	14.67	14.11	14.35	x	14.67	916
6	Ed Cockrell (USA)	14.13	14.16	12.69	13.85	x	13.52	14.16	884
7	Jorg Frischmann (GER)	13.56	13.75	x	13.53	13.23	x	13.75	858
8	Tony Falelavaki (FRA)	12.47	11.86	11.95	11.78	-	-	12.47	778
