= Edwin Cockrell =

American Paralympic athlete

Medal record

Paralympic athletics

Representing United States

Paralympic Games
Silver medal – second place	2004 Athens	Shot Put - F44/46

Edwin Cockrell is a paralympic athlete from the United States competing mainly in category F44 shot put events.

Edwin has twice competed in the Paralympics in 2000 and in 2004 where he won a silver medal in the combined F44/46 category.
