= Denmark at the 2004 Summer Paralympics =

- IPC code: DEN
- NPC: Paralympic Committee Denmark
- Website: www.paralympic.dk

in Athens
- Competitors: 32 in 9 sports
- Medals Ranked 29th: Gold 5 Silver 3 Bronze 7 Total 15

Summer Paralympics appearances (overview)
- 1968; 1972; 1976; 1980; 1984; 1988; 1992; 1996; 2000; 2004; 2008; 2012; 2016; 2020; 2024

Denmark competed at the 2004 Summer Paralympics in Athens, Greece. The team included 32 athletes, 22 men and 10 women. Competitors from Denmark won 15 medals, including 5 gold, 3 silver and 7 bronze to finish 29th in the medal table.

== Medallists ==
Medal	Name	Sport	Event
Gold	Jackie Christiansen	Athletics	Men's Shot Put F44/46
Gold	Jakob Mathiasen	Athletics	Men's Javelin F42
Gold	Karen Jacobsen	Cycling	Women's Bicycle Time Trial LC1-4/CP 3/4
Gold	Martin Enggaard Pedersen; Kenneth Hansen; Soren Holgren Jensen; Ricky Neilsen; Peter Weichel	Goalball	Men's tournament
Gold	Sisse Grynet Egeborg	Swimming	Women's 100 m Breaststroke SB8
Silver	Jackie Christiansen	Athletics	Men's Discus F44/46
Silver	Karen Breumsoe	Swimming	Women's 100 m Freestyle S4
Silver	Karen Breumsoe	Swimming	Women's 200 m Freestyle S4
Bronze	Rene Nielsen	Athletics	Men's Pentathlon P54-58
Bronze	Rene Nielsen	Athletics	Men's Shot Put F56
Bronze	Johnny Andersen	Shooting	Mixed Air Rifle Prone SH2
Bronze	Kazimierz Mechula	Shooting	Mixed Air Rifle Prone SH1
Bronze	Peter Lund Andersen	Swimming	Men's 400 m Freestyle S6
Bronze	Karen Breumsoe	Swimming	Women's 50 m Freestyle S4
Bronze	Peter Rosenmeier	Table Tennis	Men's Singles 6

== Sports ==
=== Athletics ===
==== Men's field ====
Athlete	Class	Event	Final		
Athlete	Class	Event	Result	Points	Rank
Thomas Bradal	F55-56	Javelin	27.83	952	6
Jackie Christiansen	F44/46	Discus	51.90	1038	2nd place, silver medalist(s)
Jackie Christiansen	F44/46	Shot put	15.74 WR	1083	1st place, gold medalist(s)
Jakob Mathiasen	F42	Javelin	49.57	-	1st place, gold medalist(s)
Rene Nielsen	F55-56	Javelin	33.99	1061	4
Rene Nielsen	F56	Shot put	11.27	-	3rd place, bronze medalist(s)
Rene Nielsen	P54-58	Pentathlon	5495		3rd place, bronze medalist(s)

=== Boccia ===
Athlete	Event	Preliminaries			Round of 16	Quarterfinals	Semifinals	Final	
Athlete	Event	Opponent	Opposition Score	Rank	Opposition Score	Opposition Score	Opposition Score	Opposition Score	Rank
Lone Bak-Pedersen	Mixed individual BC1	Padtong (THA)	L 5-6	3	did not advance				
Lone Bak-Pedersen	Mixed individual BC1	Aandalen (NOR)	L 5-6	3	did not advance				
Lone Bak-Pedersen	Mixed individual BC1	Leung (HKG)	W 4-3	3	did not advance				
Lone Bak-Pedersen	Mixed individual BC1	Marques (POR)	W 6-0	3	did not advance				
Lone Bak-Pedersen	Mixed individual BC1	Wilhelmsen (NOR)	W 9-2	3	did not advance				
Henrik Jorgensen	Mixed individual BC1	Grossmayer (AUT)	W 7-0	1 Q	N/A	Fernandez (POR); L 1-6	did not advance		
Henrik Jorgensen	Mixed individual BC1	Ibarburen (ARG)	W 10-0	1 Q	N/A	Fernandez (POR); L 1-6	did not advance		
Henrik Jorgensen	Mixed individual BC1	Hawker (USA)	W 14-0	1 Q	N/A	Fernandez (POR); L 1-6	did not advance		
Henrik Jorgensen	Mixed individual BC1	Lanoix-Boyer (CAN)	W 16-0	1 Q	N/A	Fernandez (POR); L 1-6	did not advance		
Bent Lorenzen	Mixed individual BC2	Toon (NZL)	L 1-8	3	did not advance				
Bent Lorenzen	Mixed individual BC2	Cordero (ESP)	L 1-14	3	did not advance				
Bent Lorenzen	Mixed individual BC2	Wong (HKG)	W 5-3	3	did not advance				
Mansoor Siddiqi	Mixed individual BC2	Steirer (AUT)	L 0-16	2 Q	Toon (NZL); L 5-6	did not advance			
Mansoor Siddiqi	Mixed individual BC2	Mongkolpun (THA)	W 4-3	2 Q	Toon (NZL); L 5-6	did not advance			
Mansoor Siddiqi	Mixed individual BC2	Murphy (IRL)	W 10-4	2 Q	Toon (NZL); L 5-6	did not advance			
Lone Bak-Pedersen; Henrik Jorgensen; Bent Lorenzen; Mansoor Siddiqi	Team BC1-2	Portugal (POR)	L 1-10	6	did not advance				
Lone Bak-Pedersen; Henrik Jorgensen; Bent Lorenzen; Mansoor Siddiqi	Team BC1-2	New Zealand (NZL)	L 0-12	6	did not advance				
Lone Bak-Pedersen; Henrik Jorgensen; Bent Lorenzen; Mansoor Siddiqi	Team BC1-2	Hong Kong (HKG)	L 2-12	6	did not advance				
Lone Bak-Pedersen; Henrik Jorgensen; Bent Lorenzen; Mansoor Siddiqi	Team BC1-2	Ireland (IRL)	L 3-7	6	did not advance				
Lone Bak-Pedersen; Henrik Jorgensen; Bent Lorenzen; Mansoor Siddiqi	Team BC1-2	Thailand (THA)	L 3-11	6	did not advance				

=== Cycling ===
==== Women ====
Athlete	Event	Time	Rank
Karen Jacobsen	Women's road time trial LC1-4/CP 3/4	27:31.57	1st place, gold medalist(s)
Karen Jacobsen	Women's 1km time trial LC1-4/CP 3/4	1:19.91	5

=== Equestrian ===
==== Individuals ====
Athlete	Event	Total	
Athlete	Event	Score	Rank
Liselotte Rosenhart	Mixed individual championship test grade II	65.273	11
Liselotte Rosenhart	Mixed individual freestyle test grade II	67.111	15
Henrik Sibbesen	Mixed individual championship test grade IV	67.548	5
Henrik Sibbesen	Mixed individual freestyle test grade IV	67.909	9
Malene Sommerlund	Mixed individual championship test grade II	65.091	12
Malene Sommerlund	Mixed individual freestyle test grade II	67.889	12
Line Thorning Jørgensen	Mixed individual championship test grade IV	66.581	7
Line Thorning Jørgensen	Mixed individual freestyle test grade IV	67.091	11

==== Team ====
Athlete	Event	Total	
Athlete	Event	Total	Rank
Liselotte Rosenhart; Henrik Sibbesen; Malene Sommerlund; Line Thorning Jørgensen	Team	392.259	8

=== Goalball ===
The men's goalball team won the gold medal after defeating Sweden in the gold medal match.

==== Players ====
- Martin Enggaard Pedersen
- Kenneth Hansen
- Soren Holmgren Jensen
- Ricky Nielsen
- Peter Weichel

==== Tournament ====
Game	Match	Score	Rank
1	Denmark vs. Sweden (SWE)	3 - 3	1 Q
2	Denmark vs. United States (USA)	10 - 7	1 Q
3	Denmark vs. Canada (CAN)	10 - 1	1 Q
4	Denmark vs. Germany (GER)	9 - 3	1 Q
5	Denmark vs. Greece (GRE)	10 - 3	1 Q
Quarterfinals	Denmark vs. Hungary (HUN)	9 - 3	W
Semifinals	Denmark vs. United States (USA)	8 - 1	W
Gold medal final	Denmark vs. Sweden (SWE)	7 - 5	1st place, gold medalist(s)

=== Shooting ===
==== Men ====
Athlete	Event	Qualification		Final		
Athlete	Event	Score	Rank	Score	Total	Rank
Johnny Andersen	Mixed 10m air rifle prone SH2	599	8 Q	105.4	704.4	3rd place, bronze medalist(s)
Johnny Andersen	Mixed 10m air rifle standing SH2	598	4 Q	103.8	701.8	5
Kazimierz Mechula	Men's 10m air rifle standing SH1	588	6 Q	100.9	688.9	7
Kazimierz Mechula	Men's 50m rifle 3 positions SH1	1107	17	did not advance		
Kazimierz Mechula	Mixed 10m air rifle prone SH1	599	6 Q	105.3	704.3	3rd place, bronze medalist(s)
Kazimierz Mechula	Mixed 50m rifle prone SH1	572	28	did not advance		

==== Women ====
Athlete	Event	Qualification		Final		
Athlete	Event	Score	Rank	Score	Total	Rank
Lone Overbye	Mixed 10m air rifle prone SH2	594	20	did not advance		
Lone Overbye	Women's 10m air pistol SH1	351	12	did not advance		

=== Swimming ===
==== Men ====
Athlete	Class	Event	Heats		Final	
Athlete	Class	Event	Result	Rank	Result	Rank
Peter Lund Andersen	S6	50m freestyle	32.55	3 Q	32.01	4
Peter Lund Andersen	S6	100m freestyle	1:10.28	3 Q	1:09.72	4
Peter Lund Andersen	S6	400m freestyle	5:31.56	3 Q	5:23.72	3rd place, bronze medalist(s)
Soren Moller	S6	100m freestyle	1:15.49	11	did not advance	
Soren Moller	S6	400m freestyle	5:34.80	4 Q	5:40.84	6
Soren Moller	S6	100m backstroke	1:22.63	6 Q	1:22.91	6
Dennis Storgaard	S9	400m freestyle	4:39.24	8 Q	4:39.20	8
Dennis Storgaard	S9	100m butterfly	1:07.97	10	did not advance	
Claus Taudorf	S10	50m freestyle	26.71	9	did not advance	
Claus Taudorf	S10	100m freestyle	58.14	9	did not advance	
Claus Taudorf	SB9	100m breaststroke	1:15.97	8 Q	1:16.38	8

==== Women ====
Athlete	Class	Event	Heats		Final	
Athlete	Class	Event	Result	Rank	Result	Rank
Karen Breumsoe	S4	50m freestyle	53.80	4 Q	53.18	3rd place, bronze medalist(s)
Karen Breumsoe	S4	100m freestyle	1:50.96	2 Q	1:51.00	2nd place, silver medalist(s)
Karen Breumsoe	S4	200m freestyle	3:56.20	2 Q	3:50.92	2nd place, silver medalist(s)
Karen Breumsoe	S4	50m butterfly	N/A		DSQ	
Kathrine Gronkjaer	S9	100m butterfly	1:20.65	10	did not advance	
Kathrine Gronkjaer	SM9	200m individual medley	2:59.52	12	did not advance	
Sisse Grynet Egeborg	S9	50m freestyle	32.27	7 Q	32.19	8
Sisse Grynet Egeborg	S9	100m butterfly	1:18.44	7 Q	1:18.10	5
Sisse Grynet Egeborg	SB8	100m breaststroke	1:27.06	1 Q	1:23.85 PR	1st place, gold medalist(s)
Sisse Grynet Egeborg	SM9	200m individual medley	2:51.04	3 Q	2:53.01	7
Mia Juhl Mortensen	S10	50m freestyle	31.70	9	did not advance	
Mia Juhl Mortensen	S10	100m freestyle	1:08.95	10	did not advance	
Mia Juhl Mortensen	S10	400m freestyle	5:11.23	5 Q	5:11.30	6
Mia Juhl Mortensen	SM10	200m individual medley	2:51.93	7 Q	2:54.65	8

=== Table tennis ===
==== Men ====
Athlete	Event	Preliminaries				Quarterfinals	Semifinals	Final / BM	
Athlete	Event	Opposition Result	Opposition Result	Opposition Result	Rank	Opposition Result	Opposition Result	Opposition Result	Rank
Michal Jensen	Men's singles 6	Schmidt (GER); L 1-3	Itkonen (SWE); W 3–2	Solis (CHI); W 3–0	2 Q	Kowalski (POL); L 1–3	did not advance		
Peter Rosenmeier	Men's singles 6	Buzin (RUS); W 3-1	du Plooy (RSA); W 3-0	Ono (JPN); W 3-1	1 Q	Blok (NED); W 3-2	Schmidt (GER); L 0-3	Kowalski (POL); W 3-0	3rd place, bronze medalist(s)
Michal Jensen; Peter Rosenmeier	Men's team 6-7	France (FRA); L 1-3	Sweden (SWE); W 3-2	Netherlands (NED); W 3-2	3	did not advance			

== See also ==
- Denmark at the Paralympics
- Denmark at the 2004 Summer Olympics
