= Paul Raison (athlete) =

Australian Paralympic athlete

Medal record

Paralympic athletics

Representing Australia

Paralympic Games
Silver medal – second place	2008 Beijing	Shot Put – F44
Bronze medal – third place	2008 Beijing	4x100m – T42-46

Paul Raison (born 29 December 1977) is a Paralympian athlete from Australia competing in category F44 shot put, discus and 4 × 100 m relay events.

He was born in Townsville, Queensland. He had his leg amputated below the knee following a motorcycle accident in 2004.

His very first International Competition was in the Netherlands – September 2006 at the IPC World Championships where he finished 6th for Shot Put and 7th for discus. On 10–18 May 2007 in Darwin he competed at the IPC Oceania Championships. There he won two Gold Medals for Shot Put and Discus (IPC Oceania Championships). This event was combined with the ARAFURA Games where he won 2 Gold for Discus, Hammer and Silver for Shot Put (ARAFURA Games). In March 2008, he competed at the Australian National Championships and Olympic Trials where he won two Gold medals for Shot Put and Discus, his throws were also an 'A' Qualifier for the Beijing Paralympics 2008.

He competed in the 2008 Summer Paralympics in Beijing, China. Though he failed to win a medal in the F44 discus he did go on to win a silver medal in the men's F44 shot put event and was a member of the Australian Relay team that won the bronze medal in the T42-46 4 × 100 m relay. Paul Raison currently holds the Australian F44 records for; Shot Put, Discus and Hammer.

He was awarded the Sporting Wheelies' Queensland Amateur Athlete of the Year 2006 and North Queensland Athlete of the Year 2007.
