= Gerdán Fonseca =

Cuban Paralympic athlete

Medal record

Paralympic athletics

Representing Cuba

Paralympic Games
Bronze medal – third place	2004 Athens	Shot put F44/46
Bronze medal – third place	2008 Beijing	Shot put F44

Parapan American Games
Silver medal – second place	2011 Guadalajara	Javelin throw F44
Silver medal – second place	2015 Toronto	Javelin throw F44

Gerdán Fonseca is a Paralympian athlete from Cuba competing mainly in category F44 shot put events.

Gerdán won the bronze medal in the F44/46 shot put event in the 2004 Summer Paralympics in Athens, Greece. Four years later, in the F44 class, he repeated this feet in Beijing in the 2008 Summer Paralympics where he also competed in the F44 discus.
