= Jackie Christiansen =

Danish Paralympic athlete

Personal information
- Full name: Jackie Tony Christiansen
- Nationality: Danish
- Born: 5 March 1977 (age 49)

Sport
- Country: Denmark
- Sport: Paralympic athletics
- Disability class: F44
- Event: Throwing events
Medal record
Event	1st	2nd	3rd
Paralympic Games	3	2	0
World Championships	2	1	0
European Championships	1	0	0
Paralympic athletics
Representing Denmark
Paralympic Games
Gold medal – first place	2004 Athens	Shot Put – F44/46
Gold medal – first place	2008 Beijing	Shot Put – F44
Gold medal – first place	2012 London	Shot Put - F42-44
Silver medal – second place	2004 Athens	Discus Throw – F44/46
Silver medal – second place	2008 Beijing	Discus Throw - F44
IPC Athletics World Championships
Gold medal – first place	2011 Christchurch	Shot put F44
Gold medal – first place	2013 Lyon	Shot put F44
Silver medal – second place	2015 Doha	Shot put F44
IPC European Championships
Gold medal – first place	2012 Stadskanaal	Shot put - F44

Jackie Christiansen (born 5 March 1977) is a Paralympic athlete from Denmark. When he was 17, he broke his leg during a football game. Because of a medical error, he developed gangrene, and his left leg was amputated below the knee. He competes in throwing events in the F44 classification.

Christiansen has competed in four Paralympics starting in 2000 in Sydney, Australia where he finished sixth in the shot put for F44 athletes. He later improved on this, winning gold in 2004 in the F44/46 class and in 2008 in the F44 class. He also won two silver medals in the discus, in the F44/46 class in 2004 and the F44 class in 2008. He won the F42/44 shot put gold medal at the 2012 Summer Paralympics in London.

Jackie Christiansen holds the world shot put record in the F44 class with 18.38 m (60.3 ft) set 21 August 2011 in Olomouc, Czech Republic.

He was trained by E.G. Gregersen and from 2011 by Simon Stewart, and is a graduate orthopedist.

In February 2016, Christiansen announced the end of his active sports career as his shot put disability class wasn't on the programme for the Paralympic Games in Rio 2016.
