= Duane Strydom =

South African Paralympic athlete

Medal record

Paralympic athletics

Representing South Africa

Paralympic Games
Bronze medal – third place	2004 Athens	Discus Throw - F36

Duane Strydom is a paralympic athlete from South Africa competing mainly in category F36 shot put and discus events.

Duane competed in both shot and discus at the 2004 Summer Paralympics winning a bronze medal in the discus for class F36 athletes. He attempted to improve on his bronze in 2008 but in the combined F35/36 class could only manage to finish fourth.
