= David Roos =

South African Paralympic athlete

Medal record

Paralympic athletics

Representing South Africa

World Championships
Gold medal – first place	2011 Christchurch	4x100m T42-46

Paralympic Games
Silver medal – second place	2008 Beijing	Long Jump F46
Bronze medal – third place	2000 Sydney	High Jump F46

Commonwealth Games
Silver medal – second place	2006 Melbourne	200m T46

All Africa Games
Gold medal – first place	2007 Algiers	Long Jump F46
Bronze medal – third place	2007 Algiers	100m T46
Bronze medal – third place	2003 Abuja	100m T46

World Championships
Bronze medal – third place	2002 Lille	High Jump F46

World Championships
Gold medal – first place	1999 Barcelona	High Jump F46

David Roos (born 29 May 1982 in Queenstown) is a South African Paralympian athlete who competes mainly in category F46 sprints, long and high jump events.

Career

Roos has competed in three Paralympic Games:

2000 Summer Paralympics: Competed in the T46 100 metres and F46 long jump as well as winning a bronze medal in the F46 high jump.

2004 Summer Paralympics, Athens: Competed in the T46 200m, F46 long jump and F44/46 high jump but did not win any medals.

2008 Summer Paralympics: Won a silver medal in the F46 long jump and competed in the T46 100 and 200 metres and the F44/46 high jump.

In addition to his Paralympic achievements, Raos won a gold medal at the 2011 IPC World Championships as part of the South African team for the Men's 4 x 100 metres relay.
