= Nicholas Newman (athlete) =

South African Paralympic athlete

Medal record

Paralympic athletics

Representing South Africa

Paralympic Games
Gold medal – first place	2004 Athens	Javelin Throw – F36/38
Bronze medal – third place	2008 Beijing	Javelin Throw – F35/36

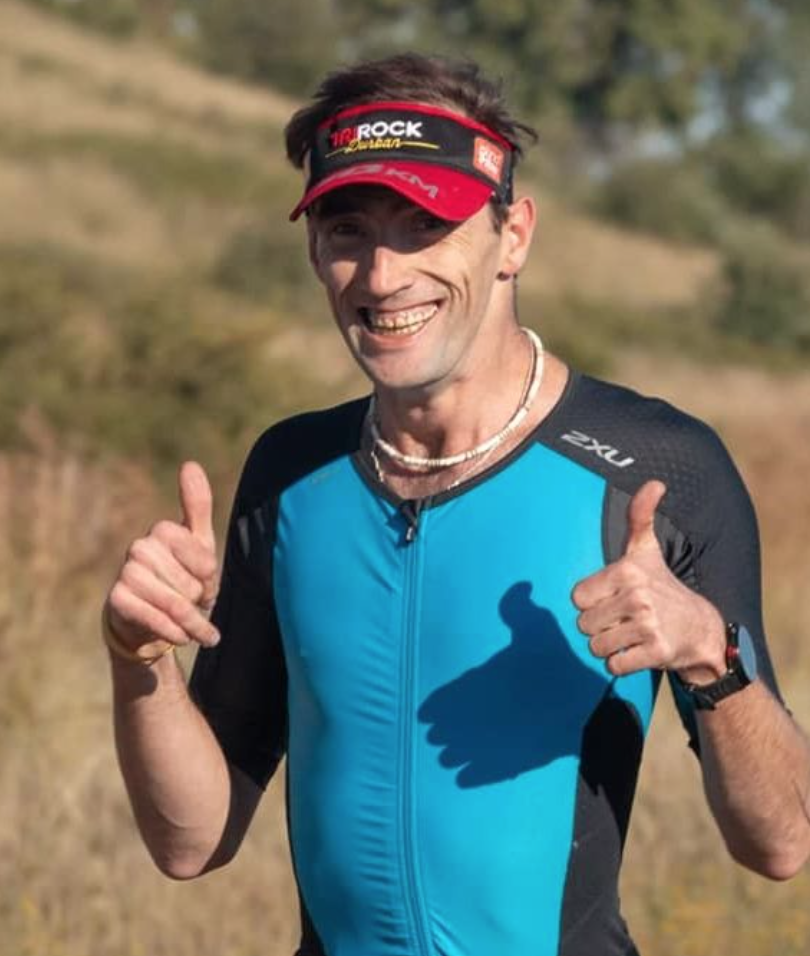
Nicholas Newman in May, 2019.

Nicholas Ian Newman is a Paralympian athlete from Bloemfontein, South Africa primarily competing in the category F36 javelin events. He was diagnosed with Cerebral palsy from birth.

== Sporting events of note ==
In the 2001 SA Games (in Stellenbosch, South Africa) he broke the Senior world record whilst a Junior, and in the 2003 SA Games (in Germiston, South Africa) he broke his world record.

In 2004, Newman competed in the 2004 Summer Paralympics in Athens, Greece in which he was not awarded a medal in the F36 shotput but continued to win the gold medal in the F36/38 javelin competition. Four years later in the 2008 Summer Paralympics in Beijing, China he finished third, awarded a bronze medal, whilst attempting to defend his title in the F36/38 javelin event.

In 2013 he competed in the ITU World Triathlon Grand Final, held in London, where he finished 13th. In 2015, he competed in the ITU World Paratriathlon Event held in Buffalo City, South Africa in which he finished 12th. One year later he competed again and placed 13th.

In 2014, 2015, 2017, and 2018, he competed in the RSA Paratriathlon National Championships placing fourth twice, second, and first respectively. In 2017, Newman placed second to Ryan Jarrett Willers, the sole other athlete in the PTS5 Men category. The time achieved in the 2017 event by Newman was 1 hour, 38 minutes, and 4 seconds.

He recently completed a 70.3 Ironman in Buffalo City, South Africa.

In 2019, Newman was selected to participate in the ITU World Triathlon Grand Final Lausanne in Lausanne, Switzerland from August 30, 2019, to September 1, 2019. He placed 96th in his category of 35-39 Male AG Sprint, with a time of 1 hour, 28 minutes, and 4 seconds.

On the 5th of September 2021, Newman completed a half Ironman 70.3 triathlon in 6 hours, 2 minutes and 5 seconds, finishing 236th overall, and 191st out of all males completing the race.

On the 21st of November 2021, Newman completed a full Ironman 140.6 African champs in Nelson Mandela Bay (in Port Elizabeth, South Africa) in 13 hours, 39 minutes, and 49 seconds, thereby placing 595th overall, 101st in his division, and 493rd out of all males.
