= Nathalie Bizet =

French para-equestrian Dressage rider

Personal information
- Born: 2 October 1966 (age 59) Beauvais, France

Sport
- Country: France
- Sport: Equestrianism
Medal record
Equestrianism
Representing France
Paralympic Games
Bronze medal – third place	1996 Atlanta	Mixed team

Nathalie Bizet (born 2 October 1966 in Beauvais) is a French Para-Equestrian Dressage rider. She won a bronze medal.

== Career ==
In 1982, at the age of 16, she began riding as an internship. Thereafter, she joined a club and began to ride regularly.

In 1988, she bought her first horse. Three years later, in 1991, she competed on the international circuit, and won a silver medal in compulsory test, at the World Championship.

At the 1996 Paralympic Games in Atlanta, she won a dressage team bronze medal. She competed in Mixed Dressage Grade IV finishing seventh, and in Mixed Kur Canter Grade IV finishing ninth. The medal allowed her in 1997, to join the Athletes SNCF system as an administrative agent at Paris Rive Gauche.

At the 2000 Paralympic Games, she competed in Mixed Dressage - Championship Grade IV, and Mixed Dressage - Freestyle Grade IV.

At the 2004 Paralympic Games in Athens, she competed in Mixed Dressage - Championship Grade IV, and Mixed Dressage - Freestyle Grade IV.

At the 2008 Paralympic Games, she competed in Mixed Dressage - Freestyle Grade IV, and Mixed Dressage - Championship Grade IV.

At the 2012 Paralympic Games, she competed in Dressage - Freestyle Grade IV, Dressage - Championship Grade IV, and Dressage - Team.

In 2002, she finished eighth in the European championship, sixth and eighth respectively in compulsory dressage and free dressage.

In 2005, she finished third in the European championship.

She also holds 26 French championship titles.

Nathalie has won more than 500 prizes, including around 80 victories among able-bodied riders.
