= Karen Brain =

Canadian Paralympic equestrian

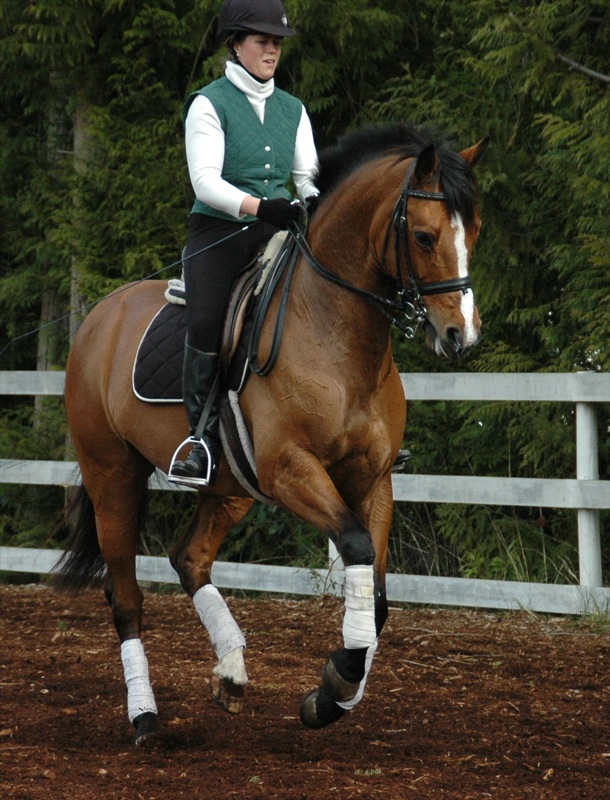

Personal information
- Nationality: Canadian
- Born: 26 April 1970 (age 56) Saanichton, British Columbia, Canada

Sport
- Country: Canada
- Sport: Equestrian

Achievements and titles
- Paralympic finals: 2004, 2008
Medal record
Representing Canada
Paralympic Games
Equestrian
Bronze medal – third place	2004 Athens	Individual championship dressage GIV
Bronze medal – third place	2004 Athens	Individual freestyle dressage GIV

Karen Brain (born 26 April 1970) is a Canadian Paralympic equestrian. She won two medals in the 2004 Summer Paralympics.

== Early life ==
Karen Brain was born in Victoria in 1970 to Darlene and Bill Brain. She began horseback riding with her sister at Oak Meadows Farm when she was 8 years old. By age 9, she was learning to jump. At 11 years old, Brain got her first horse, Patty, a 15.3 hh chestnut Thoroughbred. A year and a half later, Brain sold Patty and purchased Pumpkin, an American Quarter Horse. Brain continued to advance on Pumpkin, earning ribbons in various classes. In 1983, Brain met Alpine Renegade (Alpo), a 6 year old 15 hh gelding. The two had early successes, leading Brain to buy him in 1983. In 1984, Brain was deeply immersed in horseback riding, working and riding at Spring Ridge Farm. She began eventing on Alpo, winning her first pre-training event in 1985 in Maple Ridge, British Columbia. In 1987, Brain participated in the Western Canada Summer Games in Regina, Saskatchewan. She placed fifth in preliminary-level three day eventing. In 1988, at age 18, Brain moved to Ontario and began working for Nick Holmes-Smith. In November 1988, Brain was selected for a scholarship to train with Mark Phillips in England. In February 1989, Brain and Alpo flew to England. In April 1989, Brain's horse Alpo was injured at the Gatwick Horse Trials. This injury highlighted Alpo's limitations as a small horse. When Brain returned to Canada and began to seriously prepare for the Olympics, she made the decision to sell Alpo. In 1992, while working at Hunt Valley Farm in Victoria, Brain found Merlin, a 15.3 HH Thoroughbred she dubbed Double Take. The team competed at events across North America throughout the 1990s.

== Accident ==
On September 18, 2001, Karen Brain fell off her horse Miko, shattering her T12 vertebrae and puncturing a lung. The accident resulted in incomplete paraplegia.

== Paralympics ==
Karen Brain competed in the 2004 Summer Paralympics and the 2008 Summer Paralympics. She won bronze in individual championship dressage and individual freestyle dressage at the 2004 Paralympics. She placed 10th in the individual freestyle dressage and 7th in team dressage at the 2008 Paralympics

== Honours & Awards ==
- Awarded the 1989 Air Canada scholarship to train with Captain Mark Phillips in Scotland and England
- Won the Horse Trials Canada Scholarship in 1997
- Featured on the Cover of Horse & Sport Magazine in 1997
- Featured on the cover of Horse & Country Magazine in 1998
- Nominated for the Courage to Come Back Award in 2005
- Awarded the British Columbia Premier's Athletic Award in 2005
- Torchbearer at the 2010 Winter Olympics
- Won the Disabled Spelling Bee competition in 1998
