= Sjerstin Vermeulen =

Dutch swimmer and equestrian

Sjerstin de Vries-Vermeulen
Personal information
- Born: Sjerstin Vermeulen; 1972 or 1973 (age 52–53) Varik, Netherlands
- Years active: 1988-c.2009

Sport
- Sport: Swimming; Equestrian
- Disability class: L6 (swimming); Grade IV (equestrian)

Achievements and titles
- Paralympic finals: 1988, 2000, 2004, 2008
Medal record
Representing Netherlands
Paralympic Games
| Silver medal – second place | 1988 Seoul | 100m breaststroke L6 |
| Silver medal – second place | 1988 Seoul | 100m backstroke L6 |
| Silver medal – second place | 1988 Seoul | 400m freestyle L6 |
| Bronze medal – third place | 1988 Seoul | 100m freestyle L6 |
| Bronze medal – third place | 1988 Seoul | 200m medley L6 |
| Silver medal – second place | 2000 Sydney | Mixed dressage team |
| Bronze medal – third place | 2004 Athens | Mixed dressage team |

Sjerstin de Vries-Vermeulen (née Vermeulen, born 1972 or 1973) is a Dutch former swimmer and equestrian, who competed at four Paralympic Games. She won five swimming medals at the 1988 Summer Paralympics, and won equestrian medals at the 2000 and 2004 Summer Paralympics in the mixed team dressage event.

== Personal life ==
Vermuelen is from Varik, Netherlands, and now lives in Ermelo, Netherlands. She was born with only one hand.

== Career ==
Vermeulen won two silver medals and three bronze medals in L6 classification swimming events at the 1988 Summer Paralympics. She came second in the 100m breaststroke L6, 100m backstroke L6 and 400m freestyle L6 events, and third in the 100m freestyle L6 and 200m individual medley L6 races.

In dressage, Vermeulen competed in the Grade IV classification. She competed in the dressage events at the 2000 Summer Paralympics. She came seventh and eighth in the individual events, and won a silver medal in the team event, alongside Gert Bolmer, Joop Stokkel and Ineke de Groot. At the 2004 Summer Paralympics, she came fifth and eighth in the individual dressage events, and won a bronze medal in the team dressage events, alongside Stokkel and Bolmer. Vermuelen initially failed to qualify for the 2008 Summer Paralympics dressage events on her horse Kenzo. After being recommended to change to the horse Sultano, she qualified for the Games. It was her fourth appearance at the Paralympics. She finished fourth and seventh in the individual events, and fifth in the team event. Her seventh place in the freestyle event made her the highest Dutch finisher in the competition. In 2009, she competed in the Netherlands National Championships in Breda.

== Post-career ==
In 2017, Vermeulen supervised a 12-hour trampolining session in Ermelo, to raise money for a 15-year-old club member. She now works as a coach at Stal Ermelo (Ermelo stables).
