= Georgia Bruce =

Australian equestrian (born 1981)

Personal information
- Full name: Georgia Bruce
- Nationality: Australia
- Born: 7 May 1981 (age 45) Cairns, Queensland
- Height: 168 cm (5 ft 6 in)
Medal record
Equestrian
Paralympic Games
Bronze medal – third place	2008 Beijing	Mixed Dressage – Championship grade IV
Bronze medal – third place	2008 Beijing	Mixed Dressage – Freestyle grade IV

Georgia Bruce (born 7 May 1981) is an expert in equine behavior and psychology. She specializes in the positive reinforcement based training method known as "Clicker Training". Georgia has written two books about clicker training horses and has also produced an Online Training Course on equine clicker training. Bruce gives lessons, clinics, trick shows and clicker training demonstrations around Australia. Her broad repertoire of horse training skills includes training trick horses, liberty horses, wild horses, starting young horses and retraining horses with problem behaviours. Bruce also has extensive experience training horses for high level performance in both dressage and reining.

Bruce has represented Australia on 12 occasions in the equestrian sport of dressage. She competed at the 2004 Athens Games. She won a bronze medal at the 2008 Beijing Games in the Mixed Dressage – Championship grade IV event and a bronze medal in the Mixed Dressage – Freestyle grade IV event. She has no radial bone or thumb on her right hand.
