= Philippa Johnson =

South African equestrian

Philippa Johnson-Dwyer
Personal information
- Nationality: South African
- Born: Philippa Johnson; 9 December 1974 (age 51) Johannesburg, South Africa

Sport
- Country: South Africa
- Sport: Equestrianism
Medal record
Para-equestrian Dressage
Representing South Africa
Paralympic Games
Gold medal – first place	2008 Beijing	Championship IV
Gold medal – first place	2008 Beijing	Freestyle IV
Silver medal – second place	2004 Athens	Championship IV
Silver medal – second place	2004 Athens	Freestyle IV
World Equestrian Games
Silver medal – second place	2007 Hartpury	Individual IV
Bronze medal – third place	2007 Hartpury	Freestyle IV

Philippa Johnson-Dwyer (born 9 December 1974 Johannesburg, South Africa) is a South African para equestrian athlete and double Paralympic gold medallist. Johnson-Dwyer won two individual gold medals at the 2008 Paralympic Games and two individual silver medals at the 2004 Paralympic Games. In 2002 Philippa moved to Belgium to pursue a career in equestrian. Since 2002, Johnson-Dwyer has competed over 150 international competitions, including five Paralympic Games and three World Championships, making Johnson one of the most decorated equestrian athletes from South Africa.

Philippa became disabled after a traumatic car accident in the autumn of 1998. She lost all her strength in her right arm and 60% of the strength in her right leg.
