= Ann Cathrin Lübbe =

Norwegian paralympic equestrian

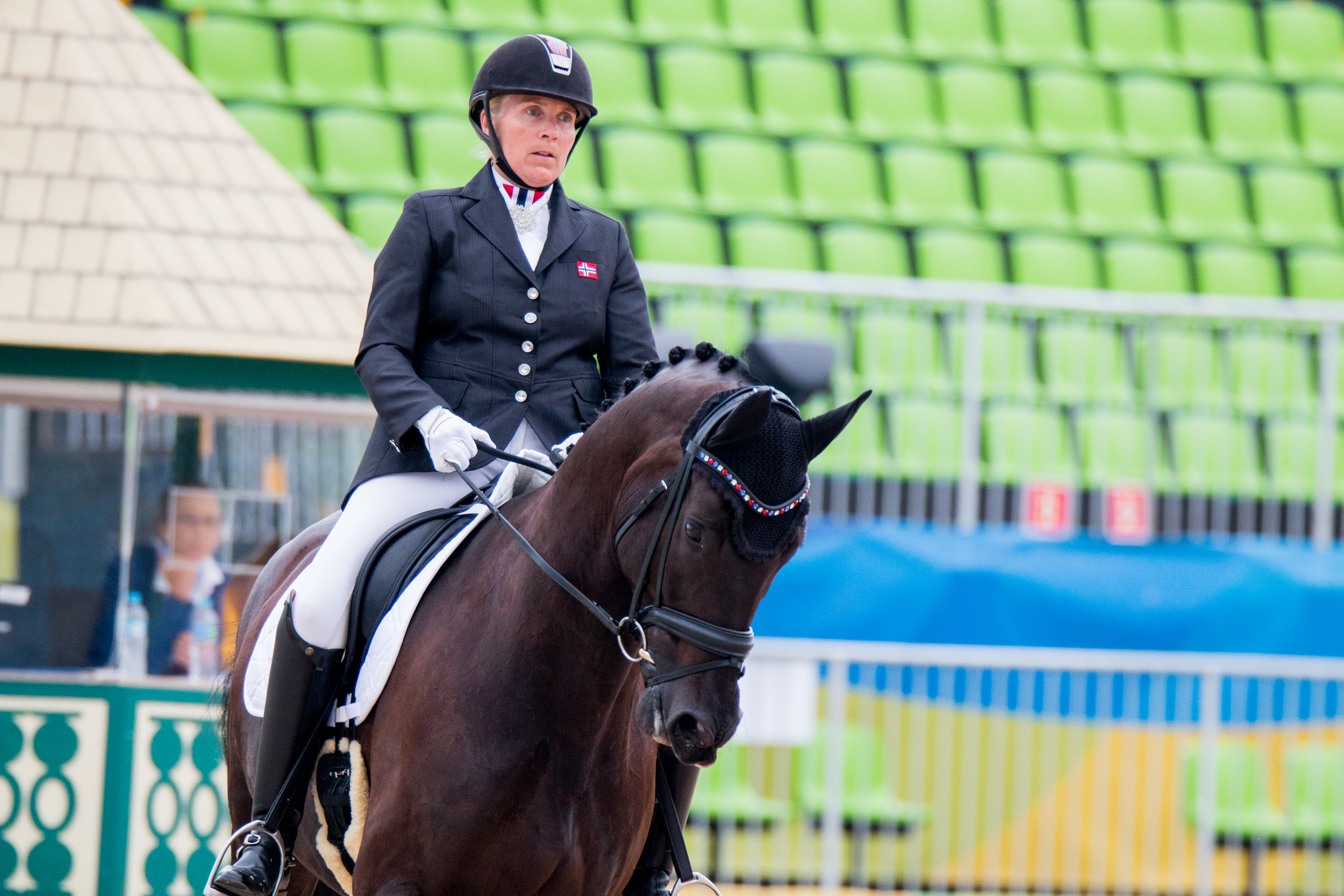
- 2016

Personal information
- Born: Ann Cathrin Evenrud; 23 January 1971 (age 55) Hamar, Norway\
Medal record
Para equestrian
Representing Norway
Paralympic Games
Gold medal – first place	2004 Athens	Individual championship dressage GIV
Gold medal – first place	2004 Athens	Individual freestyle dressage GIV
Gold medal – first place	2016 Rio de Janeiro	Individual Championship test grade III
Silver medal – second place	2008 Beijing	Individual championship test grade IV
Silver medal – second place	2008 Beijing	Individual freestyle test grade IV
Silver medal – second place	2016 Rio de Janeiro	Individual Freestyle test grade III
Bronze medal – third place	2008 Beijing	Mixed dressage team
Bronze medal – third place	2020 Tokyo	Individual freestyle test grade III

Ann Cathrin Lübbe (née Evenrud; born 23 January 1971) is a Norwegian Paralympic equestrian. She competed at the 2016 Summer Paralympics, winning a gold medal and silver medal. She competed at the 2020 Summer Paralympics, in Individual freestyle test grade III, winning a bronze medal.
