= Equestrian at the 2012 Summer Paralympics – Individual championship test grade Ib =

Equestrian – Individual championship test, grade Ib at the XIV Paralympic Games
- Venue: Greenwich Park
- Date: 1 September 2012
- Competitors: 15 from 13 nations
- Winning score: 75.826

Medalists
1st place, gold medalist(s)		Joann Formosa	Australia
2nd place, silver medalist(s)		Lee Pearson	Great Britain
3rd place, bronze medalist(s)		Pepo Puch	Austria

The individual championship test, grade Ib, para-equestrian dressage event at the 2012 Summer Paralympics was contested on 1 September at Greenwich Park in London.

The competition was assessed by a ground jury composed of five judges placed at locations designated E, H, C, M, and B. Each judge rated the competitors' performances with a percentage score. The five scores from the jury were then averaged to determine a rider's total percentage score.

== Ground jury ==
Judge at E	Kjell Myhre ( Norway)
Judge at H	Gudrun Hofinga ( Germany)
Judge at C	Sarah Rodger ( Great Britain), jury president
Judge at M	Carlos Lopes ( Portugal)
Judge at B	Anne Prain ( France)

== Results ==
T = Team Member (see Equestrian at the 2012 Summer Paralympics – Team).

Rank	Rider	Horse	Percentage score (and rank)					Total % score	Note
Rank	Rider	Horse	E	H	C	M	B	Total % score	Note
1st place, gold medalist(s)	Joann Formosa (AUS)	Worldwide PB	74.130 (2)	76.957 (1)	78.913 (1)	72.609 (2)	76.522 (2)	75.826	T
2nd place, silver medalist(s)	Lee Pearson (GBR)	Gentleman	77.826 (1)	74.348 (2)	77.174 (2)	72.391 (3)	75.217 (3)	75.391	T
3rd place, bronze medalist(s)	Pepo Puch (AUT)	Fine Feeling	73.913 (3)	74.348 (2)	75.435 (3)	73.478 (1)	78.043 (1)	75.043	
4	Jonathan Wentz (USA)	Richter Scale	66.957 (9)	66.087 (8)	73.696 (4)	72.174 (4)	72.826 (4)	70.348	T
5	Katja Karjalainen (FIN)	Rosie	69.565 (5)	68.913 (6)	67.609 (7)	71.087 (5)	71.522 (6)	69.739	
6	Ashley Gowanlock (CAN)	Maile	69.783 (4)	69.783 (5)	68.261 (6)	68.261 (7)	70.435 (7)	69.304	T
7	Jens Lasse Dokkan (NOR)	Leopold	67.391 (6)	68.913 (6)	69.130 (5)	67.609 (9)	71.957 (5)	69.000	T
8	Valerie Salles (FRA)	Menzana d'Hulm	66.304 (10)	70.217 (4)	67.391 (8)	67.826 (8)	68.696 (8)	68.087	T
9	Sara Duarte (POR)	Neapolitano Morella	67.391 (6)	63.478 (10)	67.174 (9)	70.217 (6)	63.043 (12)	66.261	
10	Jaana Kivimaki (FIN)	Grivis	65.870 (11)	65.000 (9)	65.652 (11)	66.304 (12)	66.957 (9)	65.957	
11	Davi Salazar Pessoa Mesquita (BRA)	Dauerbrenner	67.174 (8)	61.957 (13)	65.217 (12)	67.391 (10)	64.565 (10)	65.261	T
12	Nobumasa Asakawa (JPN)	Rosado	61.957 (12)	63.261 (11)	63.478 (14)	61.304 (14)	64.130 (11)	62.826	
13	Marion Milne (RSA)	Shadow	59.130 (15)	62.174 (12)	65.217 (12)	64.565 (13)	63.043 (12)	62.826	T
14	Marcos Fernandes Alves (BRA)	Luthenay de Vernay	61.087 (13)	58.043 (15)	65.870 (10)	66.957 (11)	61.087 (14)	62.609	T
15	Maximillian Tan (SIN)	Avalon	61.087 (13)	59.348 (14)	58.478 (15)	59.348 (15)	58.261 (15)	59.304	T
