= Equestrian at the 2012 Summer Paralympics – Team =

Equestrian – Team Championship at the XIV Paralympic Games
- Venue: Greenwich Park
- Date: 30 August – 2 September
- Competitors: 16
- Winning score: 468.817

Medalists
1st place, gold medalist(s)		Lee Pearson; Sophie Wells; Deborah Criddle; Sophie Christiansen	Great Britain
2nd place, silver medalist(s)		Angelika Trabert; Britta Napel; Steffen Zeibig; Hannelore Brenner	Germany
3rd place, bronze medalist(s)		Eilish Byrne; James Dwyer; Geraldine Savage; Helen Kearney	Ireland

The team championship, para-equestrian dressage event at the 2012 Summer Paralympics was decided by tests ridden at Greenwich Park in London. Each rider performed two tests, the Team Test on 30–31 August and the Individual Championship Test on 1–2 September (for which individual medals were also awarded). Team scores were the sum of the best 3 individual aggregates.

== Team ranking ==
TT = Team Test; CT = Championship Test; # = Score not counted in team total.
EL = Eliminated; WD = Withdrawn; RT = Retired.

Rank	Country	Rider	Grade	Horse	TT%	CT%	Total Score	Note	Team Score
1st place, gold medalist(s)	Great Britain	Lee Pearson	Ib	Gentleman	74.682	75.391	150.073		468.817
1st place, gold medalist(s)	Great Britain	Sophie Wells	IV	Pinocchio	75.906	76.323	152.229		468.817
1st place, gold medalist(s)	Great Britain	Deborah Criddle	III	LJT Akilles	72.926	71.267	144.193	#	468.817
1st place, gold medalist(s)	Great Britain	Sophie Christiansen	Ia	Janeiro 6	83.765	82.750	166.515		468.817
2nd place, silver medalist(s)	Germany	Angelika Trabert	II	Ariva-Avanti	67.143	76.000	143.143		440.970
2nd place, silver medalist(s)	Germany	Britta Napel	II	Aquilina 3	72.571	76.048	148.619		440.970
2nd place, silver medalist(s)	Germany	Steffen Zeibig	III	Waldemar	67.667	66.233	133.900	#	440.970
2nd place, silver medalist(s)	Germany	Hannelore Brenner	III	Women of the World	75.741	73.467	149.208		440.970
3rd place, bronze medalist(s)	Ireland	Eilish Byrne	II	Youri	67.714	73.429	141.143		428.313
3rd place, bronze medalist(s)	Ireland	James Dwyer	IV	Orlando	69.719	68.516	138.235		428.313
3rd place, bronze medalist(s)	Ireland	Geraldine Savage	Ia	Blues Tip Top Too	68.000	68.800	136.800	#	428.313
3rd place, bronze medalist(s)	Ireland	Helen Kearney	Ia	Mister Cool	72.235	76.700	148.935		428.313
4	Netherlands	Gert Bolmer	II	Vorman	66.143	70.143	136.286	#	428.253
4	Netherlands	Petra van de Sande	II	Valencia Z	68.095	74.476	142.571		428.253
4	Netherlands	Frank Hosmar	IV	Alphaville	71.781	73.097	144.878		428.253
4	Netherlands	Sanne Voets	III	Vedet PB	72.037	68.767	140.804		428.253
5	Belgium	Barbara Minneci	II	Barilla	68.571	70.095	138.666		427.000
5	Belgium	Ciska Vermeulen	IV	Whooney Tunes	66.750	71.613	138.363		427.000
5	Belgium	Michèle George	IV	Rainman	72.906	77.065	149.971		427.000
5	Belgium	Ulricke Dekeyzer	IV	Cleverboy van d'Abel	68.625	68.000	136.625	#	427.000
6	Denmark	Line Thorning Jørgensen	IV	Di Caprio	69.406	70.258	139.664		424.819
6	Denmark	Susanne Sunesen	III	Thy's Que Faire	71.333	69.700	141.033		424.819
6	Denmark	Annika Dalskov	III	Aros A Fenris	72.889	71.233	144.122		424.819
6	Denmark	Liselotte Rosenhart	Ia	Priors Lady Rawage	68.765	70.000	138.765	#	424.819
7	United States	Dale Dedrick	II	Bonifatius	60.286	64.619	124.905	#	417.528
7	United States	Rebecca Hart	II	Lord Ludger	69.095	68.286	137.381		417.528
7	United States	Jonathan Wentz	Ib	Richter Scale	70.364	70.348	140.712		417.528
7	United States	Donna Ponessa	Ia	Western Rose	70.235	69.200	139.435		417.528
8	Canada	Lauren Barwick	II	Off To Paris	72.095	71.857	143.952		416.125
8	Canada	Ashley Gowanlock	Ib	Maile	67.955	69.304	137.259		416.125
8	Canada	Eleonore Elstone	IV	Zareno	66.688	68.226	134.914		416.125
8	Canada	Jody Schloss	Ia	Inspector Rebus	63.882	67.700	131.582	#	416.125
9	France	Valerie Salles	Ib	Menzana d'Hulm	69.500	68.087	137.587		411.523
9	France	Nathalie Bizet	IV	Rubica III	67.281	67.581	134.862	#	411.523
9	France	Vladimir Vinchon	III	Flipper d'Or	69.333	67.433	136.766		411.523
9	France	Jose Letartre	III	Warina	69.370	67.800	137.170		411.523
10	Italy	Silvia Veratti	II	Zadok	62.476	69.905	132.381		405.855
10	Italy	Antonella Cecilia	II	Corlord	RT	EL	0.000	#	405.855
10	Italy	Francesca Salvade	II	Come On	67.619	67.381	135.000		405.855
10	Italy	Sara Morganti	Ia	Royal Delight	69.824	68.650	138.474		405.855
11	Singapore	Maximillian Tan	Ib	Avalon	63.364	59.304	122.668		404.191
11	Singapore	Gemma Rose Jen Foo	Ia	Avalon	68.588	65.050	133.638		404.191
11	Singapore	Laurentia Tan	Ia	Ruben James 2	74.235	73.650	147.885		404.191
12	Australia	Grace Bowman	II	Kirby Park Joy	57.048	EL	57.048	#	403.986
12	Australia	Joann Formosa	Ib	Worldwide PB	71.955	75.826	147.781		403.986
12	Australia	Hannah Dodd	IV	Waikiwi	66.156	65.161	131.317		403.986
12	Australia	Rob Oakley	Ia	Statford Mantovani	57.588	67.300	124.888		403.986
13	Brazil	Elisa Melaranci	II	Zabelle	59.905	66.952	126.857	#	399.287
13	Brazil	D Salazar Pessoa Mesquita	Ib	Dauerbrenner	66.682	65.261	131.943		399.287
13	Brazil	Marcos Fernandes Alves	Ib	Luthenay De Vernay	65.682	62.609	128.291		399.287
13	Brazil	Sergio Froes Ribeiro De Oliva	Ia	Emily	71.353	67.700	139.053		399.287
14	South Africa	Anthony Dawson	II	Roffelaar	62.143	64.571	126.714	#	387.972
14	South Africa	Wendy Moller	II	First Lady Van Prins	64.429	66.000	130.429		387.972
14	South Africa	Marion Milne	Ib	Shadow	65.818	62.826	128.644		387.972
14	South Africa	Philippa Johnson	IV	Lord Louis	63.125	65.774	128.899		387.972
15	Mexico	Fernando Figueroa Romero	II	Uwannabemine	54.905	58.810	113.715		369.858
15	Mexico	Maria F Otheguy Gonzalez	II	Welton Adonis	60.381	61.667	122.048		369.858
15	Mexico	Erika C Baitenmann Haakh	II	Casablanca	66.000	68.095	134.095		369.858
16	Norway	Jens Lasse Dokkan	Ib	Leopold	65.409	69.000	134.409		328.116
16	Norway	Marianne Muri	IV	Fantastico	64.906	64.097	129.003		328.116
16	Norway	Anne Cecilie Ore	III	Ballantine	64.704	WD	64.704		328.116

== Team Test – Grade Ia ==
The Grade Ia Team Test was ridden on 31 August.

Juror at E: Freddy Leyman ( Belgium); H: Anne Prain ( France); C: Carlos Lopes ( Portugal); M: Kjell Myhre ( Norway); B: Gudrun Hofinga ( Germany).

T = Team Member (non-team riders also participated).

Rank	Rider	Horse	Percentage score (and rank)					Total % score	Note
Rank	Rider	Horse	E	H	C	M	B	Total % score	Note
1	Sophie Christiansen (GBR)	Janeiro 6	93.824 (1)	87.353 (1)	77.647 (1)	77.353 (1)	82.647 (1)	83.765	T
2	Laurentia Tan (SIN)	Ruben James 2	77.647 (2)	76.765 (2)	69.412 (4)	72.059 (2)	75.294 (2)	74.235	T
3	Helen Kearney (IRL)	Mister Cool	70.588 (6)	74.118 (3)	69.706 (3)	71.471 (3)	75.294 (2)	72.235	T
4	Sergio Froes Ribeiro De Oliva (BRA)	Emily	72.647 (4)	71.471 (6)	72.059 (2)	70.294 (6)	70.294 (6)	71.353	T
5	Donna Ponessa (USA)	Western Rose	71.471 (5)	72.059 (4)	69.412 (4)	67.941 (8)	70.294 (6)	70.235	T
6	Sara Morganti (ITA)	Royal Delight	73.235 (3)	67.941 (11)	68.824 (6)	68.529 (7)	70.588 (5)	69.824	T
7	Liselotte Rosenhart (DEN)	Priors Lady Rawage	67.941 (9)	71.765 (5)	68.235 (8)	67.941 (8)	67.941 (10)	68.765	T
8	Gemma Rose Jen Foo (SIN)	Avalon	69.706 (7)	68.235 (10)	65.588 (10)	71.176 (5)	68.235 (9)	68.588	T
9	Rihards Snikus (LAT)	Chardonnay	66.471 (10)	70.588 (8)	65.000 (11)	66.471 (11)	72.059 (4)	68.118	
10	Geraldine Savage (IRL)	Blues Tip Top Too	68.824 (8)	68.824 (9)	66.765 (9)	67.059 (10)	68.529 (8)	68.000	T
11	Anita Johnsson (SWE)	Donar	65.882 (11)	70.882 (7)	64.412 (12)	71.471 (3)	67.059 (11)	67.941	
12	Jody Schloss (CAN)	Inspector Rebus	63.235 (12)	63.235 (12)	68.824 (6)	63.235 (12)	60.882 (12)	63.882	T
13	Tse Pui Ting Natasha (HKG)	Undulette	57.647 (14)	55.588 (14)	60.000 (13)	61.176 (13)	59.706 (14)	58.824	
14	Rob Oakley (AUS)	Statford Mantovani	62.059 (13)	56.176 (13)	52.941 (14)	56.176 (14)	60.588 (13)	57.588	T

== Team Test – Grade Ib ==
The Grade Ib Team Test was ridden on 30 August.

Juror at E: Gudrun Hofinga ( Germany); H: Kjell Myhre ( Norway); C: Lilian Iannone ( Argentina); M: Freddy Leyman ( Belgium); B: Carlos Lopes ( Portugal).

Rank	Rider	Horse	Percentage score (and rank)					Total % score	Note
Rank	Rider	Horse	E	H	C	M	B	Total % score	Note
1	Lee Pearson (GBR)	Gentleman	74.773 (2)	70.682 (3)	75.227 (1)	78.182 (1)	74.545 (1)	74.682	T
2	Pepo Puch (AUT)	Fine Feeling	76.591 (1)	72.500 (1)	72.955 (3)	72.273 (3)	73.864 (2)	73.636	
3	Joann Formosa (AUS)	Worldwide PB	70.227 (4)	69.318 (4)	72.727 (4)	75.909 (2)	71.591 (3)	71.955	T
4	Katja Karjalainen (FIN)	Rosie	71.364 (3)	71.136 (2)	71.591 (6)	72.273 (3)	68.182 (8)	70.909	
5	Jonathan Wentz (USA)	Richter Scale	68.409 (5)	68.182 (5)	74.318 (2)	70.227 (7)	70.682 (5)	70.364	T
6	Valerie Salles (FRA)	Menzana d'Hulm	67.273 (6)	65.909 (9)	72.273 (5)	70.682 (6)	71.364 (4)	69.500	T
7	Sara Duarte (POR)	Neapolitano Morella	66.364 (8)	67.273 (7)	69.545 (8)	67.955 (8)	70.682 (5)	68.364	
8	Ashley Gowanlock (CAN)	Maile	65.682 (9)	66.364 (8)	68.409 (9)	71.591 (5)	67.727 (10)	67.955	T
9	D Salazar Pessoa Mesquita (BRA)	Dauerbrenner	65.682 (9)	67.500 (6)	67.727 (11)	64.545 (13)	67.955 (9)	66.682	T
10	Marion Milne (RSA)	Shadow	65.000 (11)	64.318 (12)	68.182 (10)	66.364 (10)	65.227 (12)	65.818	T
11	Marcos Fernandes Alves (BRA)	Luthenay de Vernay	67.045 (7)	65.909 (9)	69.773 (7)	60.227 (15)	65.455 (11)	65.682	T
12	Jens Lasse Dokkan (NOR)	Leopold	63.636 (12)	65.000 (11)	66.818 (13)	67.727 (9)	63.864 (13)	65.409	T
13	Nobumasa Asakawa (JPN)	Rosado	63.409 (13)	64.318 (12)	67.045 (12)	66.364 (10)	61.136 (15)	64.455	
14	Jaana Kivimaki (FIN)	Grivis	58.864 (15)	61.364 (15)	63.182 (15)	65.000 (12)	70.227 (7)	63.727	
15	Maximillian Tan (SIN)	Avalon	61.818 (14)	63.864 (14)	65.682 (14)	62.727 (14)	62.727 (14)	63.364	T

== Team Test – Grade II ==
The Grade II Team Test was ridden on 30 August.

Juror at E: Sarah Rodger ( Great Britain); H: Freddy Leyman ( Belgium); C: Kjell Myhre ( Norway); M: Anne Prain ( France); B: Gudrun Hofinga ( Germany).

Rank	Rider	Horse	Percentage score (and rank)					Total % score	Note
Rank	Rider	Horse	E	H	C	M	B	Total % score	Note
1	Natasha Baker (GBR)	Cabral	76.190 (1)	79.762 (1)	75.238 (1)	76.429 (1)	72.857 (1)	76.095	
2	Britta Napel (GER)	Aquilina 3	72.381 (2)	74.762 (2)	71.905 (3)	72.857 (3)	70.952 (2)	72.571	T
3	Lauren Barwick (CAN)	Off To Paris	70.476 (4)	74.048 (3)	73.095 (2)	74.048 (2)	68.810 (3)	72.095	T
4	Rebecca Hart (USA)	Lord Ludger	67.619 (6)	70.714 (5)	70.714 (4)	70.238 (5)	66.190 (7)	69.095	T
5	Barbara Minneci (BEL)	Barilla	70.000 (5)	69.286 (6)	65.952 (10)	69.524 (8)	68.095 (4)	68.571	T
6	Petra van de Sande (NED)	Valencia Z	66.429 (10)	71.667 (4)	67.857 (7)	68.095 (10)	66.429 (6)	68.095	T
7	Eilish Byrne (IRL)	Youri	67.381 (7)	69.286 (6)	65.952 (10)	70.238 (5)	65.714 (9)	67.714	T
8	Francesca Salvade (ITA)	Come On	66.429 (10)	69.286 (6)	67.143 (8)	71.190 (4)	64.048 (11)	67.619	T
9	Angelika Trabert (GER)	Ariva-Avanti	71.905 (3)	64.762 (12)	69.048 (6)	65.714 (11)	64.286 (10)	67.143	T
10	Caroline Nielsen (DEN)	Leon	66.667 (9)	65.952 (11)	66.667 (9)	70.000 (7)	61.667 (16)	66.190	
11	Gert Bolmer (NED)	Vorman	67.381 (7)	66.667 (10)	65.238 (13)	65.238 (12)	66.190 (7)	66.143	T
12	Erika C Baitenmann Haakh (MEX)	Casablanca	61.429 (16)	67.857 (9)	69.762 (5)	68.810 (9)	62.143 (15)	66.000	T
13	Wendy Moller (RSA)	First Lady Van Prins	61.905 (13)	64.762 (12)	65.476 (12)	62.857 (15)	67.143 (5)	64.429	T
14	Silvia Veratti (ITA)	Zadok	61.667 (15)	62.619 (16)	62.381 (15)	64.762 (13)	60.952 (17)	62.476	T
15	Anthony Dawson (RSA)	Roffelaar	60.952 (17)	63.333 (14)	62.143 (17)	60.714 (19)	63.571 (12)	62.143	T
16	Anthea Gunner (NZL)	Huntingdale Incognito	61.905 (13)	61.429 (18)	60.238 (18)	63.095 (14)	62.857 (13)	61.905	
17	Thomas Haller (AUT)	Hallers Dessino	62.857 (12)	62.143 (17)	60.000 (19)	61.667 (16)	60.000 (19)	61.333	
18	Maria F Otheguy Gonzalez (MEX)	Welton Adonis	60.952 (17)	57.857 (20)	62.857 (14)	60.000 (20)	60.238 (18)	60.381	T
19	Dale Dedrick (USA)	Bonifatius	60.476 (19)	54.048 (22)	62.381 (15)	61.667 (16)	62.857 (13)	60.286	T
20	Elisa Melaranci (BRA)	Zabelle	57.143 (20)	63.333 (14)	58.571 (20)	61.190 (18)	59.286 (20)	59.905	T
21	Grace Bowman (AUS)	Kirby Park Joy	56.905 (21)	57.619 (21)	56.429 (22)	57.381 (21)	56.905 (21)	57.048	T
22	Fernando Figueroa Romero (MEX)	Uwannabemine	51.667 (22)	58.571 (19)	57.619 (21)	53.810 (22)	52.857 (22)	54.905	T
T	Antonella Cecilia (ITA)	Corlord	Retired						T

== Team Test – Grade III ==
The Grade III Team Test was ridden on 31 August.

Juror at E: Anne Prain ( France); H: Sarah Rodger ( Great Britain); C: Freddy Leyman ( Belgium); M: Gudrun Hofinga ( Germany); B: Lilian Iannone ( Argentina).

Rank	Rider	Horse	Percentage score (and rank)					Total % score	Note
Rank	Rider	Horse	E	H	C	M	B	Total % score	Note
1	Hannelore Brenner (GER)	Women of the World	79.074 (1)	77.037 (1)	73.148 (3)	79.074 (1)	70.370 (3)	75.741	T
2	Deborah Criddle (GBR)	LJT Akilles	78.704 (2)	69.444 (4)	73.148 (3)	71.481 (6)	71.852 (1)	72.926	T
3	Annika Dalskov (DEN)	Aros A Fenris	75.926 (3)	71.667 (2)	72.963 (5)	74.444 (2)	69.444 (5)	72.889	T
4	Sanne Voets (NED)	Vedet PB	70.370 (6)	68.519 (5)	76.852 (1)	72.593 (5)	71.852 (1)	72.037	T
5	Susanne Sunesen (DEN)	Thy's Que Faire	70.741 (5)	67.407 (8)	75.926 (2)	73.333 (3)	69.259 (6)	71.333	T
6	Jose Letartre (FRA)	Warina	69.815 (7)	67.963 (6)	69.630 (6)	69.630 (8)	69.815 (4)	69.370	T
7	Vladimir Vinchon (FRA)	Flipper d'Or	70.926 (4)	67.963 (6)	68.704 (7)	70.741 (7)	68.333 (7)	69.333	T
8	Steffen Zeibig (GER)	Waldemar	64.444 (10)	70.000 (3)	63.704 (9)	72.778 (4)	67.407 (8)	67.667	T
9	Rachel Stock (NZL)	Rimini Park Emmerich	67.407 (9)	64.630 (10)	63.519 (10)	67.778 (9)	64.074 (10)	65.481	
10	Anne Cecilie Ore (NOR)	Ballantine	68.333 (8)	64.815 (9)	62.222 (11)	63.519 (11)	64.630 (9)	64.704	T
11	Yonatan Dresler (ISR)	Ubelisk	63.148 (11)	62.963 (11)	64.815 (8)	65.185 (10)	63.333 (12)	63.889	
12	Patricio Guglialmelli Lynch (ARG)	Nirvana Pure Indulgence	57.037 (12)	57.963 (12)	57.407 (12)	61.667 (12)	63.519 (11)	59.519	

== Team Test – Grade IV ==
The Grade IV Team Test was ridden on 31 August.

Juror at E: Lilian Iannone ( Argentina); H: Carlos Lopes ( Portugal); C: Anne Prain ( France); M: Sarah Rodger ( Great Britain); B: Kjell Myhre ( Norway).

Rank	Rider	Horse	Percentage score (and rank)					Total % score	Note
Rank	Rider	Horse	E	H	C	M	B	Total % score	Note
1	Sophie Wells (GBR)	Pinocchio	74.375 (1)	73.281 (2)	81.406 (1)	72.031 (2)	78.438 (1)	75.906	T
2	Michèle George (BEL)	Rainman	67.500 (6)	76.875 (1)	74.375 (3)	72.813 (1)	72.969 (3)	72.906	T
3	Frank Hosmar (NED)	Alphaville	66.719 (8)	72.344 (3)	75.000 (2)	70.938 (3)	73.906 (2)	71.781	T
4	James Dwyer (IRL)	Orlando	70.313 (3)	67.969 (8)	70.625 (4)	67.656 (5)	72.031 (4)	69.719	T
5	Line Thorning Jørgensen (DEN)	Di Caprio	71.719 (2)	71.250 (4)	66.563 (10)	66.563 (6)	70.938 (6)	69.406	T
6	Ulricke Dekeyzer (BEL)	Cleverboy van d'Abel	69.844 (4)	69.688 (5)	70.625 (4)	65.313 (9)	67.656 (8)	68.625	T
7	Lena Weifen (GER)	Don Turner	67.031 (7)	69.688 (5)	67.813 (8)	65.469 (8)	71.406 (5)	68.281	
8	Nathalie Bizet (FRA)	Rubica III	66.250 (9)	66.406 (10)	68.906 (7)	67.813 (4)	67.031 (10)	67.281	T
9	Ciska Vermeulen (BEL)	Whooney Tunes	66.094 (10)	68.281 (7)	69.375 (6)	65.000 (10)	65.000 (13)	66.750	T
10	Eleonore Elstone (CAN)	Zareno	65.625 (12)	67.344 (9)	67.656 (9)	65.625 (7)	67.188 (9)	66.688	T
11	Hannah Dodd (AUS)	Waikiwi	66.094 (10)	65.000 (11)	66.563 (10)	63.594 (11)	69.531 (7)	66.156	T
12	Marianne Muri (NOR)	Fantastico	69.063 (5)	63.906 (12)	63.125 (13)	61.875 (13)	66.563 (11)	64.906	T
13	Philippa Johnson (RSA)	Lord Louis	65.000 (13)	60.313 (14)	62.188 (14)	62.969 (12)	65.156 (12)	63.125	T
14	Lee Frawley (ISV)	Rhapsody	61.406 (14)	60.469 (13)	63.594 (12)	60.781 (14)	62.500 (14)	61.750	
