= Norway at the 2000 Summer Paralympics =

- IPC code: NOR
- NPC: Norwegian Olympic and Paralympic Committee and Confederation of Sports
- Website: www.idrett.no (in Norwegian)

in Sydney
- Competitors: 39
- Medals Ranked 40th: Gold 2 Silver 6 Bronze 7 Total 15

Summer Paralympics appearances (overview)
- 1960; 1964; 1968; 1972; 1976; 1980; 1984; 1988; 1992; 1996; 2000; 2004; 2008; 2012; 2016; 2020; 2024

Norway competed at the 2000 Summer Paralympics in Sydney, Australia. 39 competitors from Norway won 15 medals, including 2 gold, 6 silver and 7 bronze to finish 40th in the medal table.

== Medal table ==
Medal	Name	Sport	Event
Gold	Rune Ulvang	Swimming	Men's 100m breaststroke SB8
Gold	Noel Pedersen	Swimming	Men's 100m breaststroke SB13
Silver	Mikkel Gaarder	Athletics	Men's 200m T51
Silver	Cathrine Noettingnes; Marianne Bruun	Cycling	Women's individual pursuit tandem open
Silver	Anne Cecilie Ore	Equestrian	Mixed dressage championship grade III
Silver	Ann Cathrin Evenrud	Equestrian	Mixed dressage championship grade IV
Silver	Anne Cecilie Ore	Equestrian	Mixed dressage freestyle grade III
Silver	Eva Nesheim	Swimming	Women's 100m backstroke S7
Bronze	Cathrine Noettingnes; Marianne Bruun	Cycling	Women's tandem open
Bronze	Cathrine Noettingnes; Marianne Bruun	Cycling	Women's 1 km time trial tandem open
Bronze	Jens Lasse Dokkan	Equestrian	Mixed dressage championship grade I
Bronze	Hanne Nesheim	Equestrian	Mixed dressage championship grade III
Bronze	Jens Lasse Dokkan	Equestrian	Mixed dressage freestyle grade I
Bronze	Silje Gillund; Anne Cecilie Ore; Jens Lasse Dokkan; Ann Cathrin Evenrud	Equestrian	Mixed dressage team open
Bronze	Noel Pedersen	Swimming	Men's 100m backstroke S13

== See also ==
- Norway at the Paralympics
- Norway at the 2000 Summer Olympics
