= Nicola Tustain =

Welsh Paralympic dressage rider (born 1977)

Personal information
- National team: Great Britain
- Born: 27 December 1977 (age 48) Corwen, Wales

Sport
- Country: Great Britain
- Sport: Para equestrian
- Disability: Hemiplegia
- Event: Para dressage
Medal record
Para equestrian
Representing Great Britain
Paralympic Games
Gold medal – first place	2000 Sydney	Mixed dressage – Freestyle grade II
Gold medal – first place	2000 Sydney	Mixed dressage team open
Gold medal – first place	2004 Athens	Mixed dressage team open
Bronze medal – third place	2000 Sydney	Mixed dressage – Championship grade II
Bronze medal – third place	2004 Athens	Mixed dressage – Championship grade II
Bronze medal – third place	2004 Athens	Mixed dressage – Freestyle grade II

Nicola Tustain MBE (born 27 December 1977) is a retired Welsh Paralympic dressage rider. During her career, Tustain won multiple para-dressage medals at the World Championships and Paralympic Games. She was named a Member of the Order of the British Empire in 2010.

== Early life and education ==
Tustain was born on 27 December 1977 in Corwen, Wales. She was born with hemiplegia that paralyzed her right side. She began riding competitively when she was ten years old and participated in a Riding for the Disabled Association championship when she was twelve. Tustain joined the British equestrian team in 1993. In 1996, she completed a certificate in healthcare at Yale College, Wrexham.

== Career ==
Tustain won her first para-dressage medals at the 1999 World Championships with three gold medals. While competing in the World Championships, Tustain won an additional three gold medals at the 2003 World Championships and a gold and a silver at the 2007 World Para Dressage Championships.

Alternatively, Tustain won six Paralympic medals in dressage. At the 2000 Summer Paralympics, Tustain won a gold medal in the team and freestyle events with a bronze in the individual event. At the following Paralympics, she won a gold in the team event while winning a bronze in the individual and freestyle events at the 2004 Summer Paralympics.

Other medals include two gold and one bronze at the 2005 European Championships and multiple British Dressage Championships. She retired in 2009.

== Awards and honours ==
In 2000, Tustain was awarded the British Equestrian Federation Medal of Honour. In 2003, she was named the best dressage rider by Animal Health Trust. The following year, Tustain was nominated for the Laureus World Sports Award for Sportsperson of the Year with a Disability in 2004 but lost to Earle Connor. In 2010, Tustain was named a Member of the Order of the British Empire at the 2010 Birthday Honours.
