= Joop Stokkel =

Dutch Paralympic equestrian

Personal information
- Born: 11 April 1967 (age 59) Aalsmeerderbrug, Netherlands
- Website: JoopStokkel.nl
Medal record
Para equestrian
Representing Netherlands
Paralympic Games
Gold medal – first place	2000 Sydney	Mixed dressage Championship grade II
Silver medal – second place	2000 Sydney	Mixed dressage Freestyle grade II
Silver medal – second place	2000 Sydney	Mixed dressage team open
Silver medal – second place	2004 Athens	Individual championship test grade II
Bronze medal – third place	1996 Atlanta	Dressage grade III
Bronze medal – third place	2004 Athens	Team dressage

Joop Stokkel (born 11 April 1967 in Aalsmeerderbrug) is a Dutch Paralympian and one of the leading equestrians with a physical challenge, in the world.

Stokkel had an accident at the age of seven causing him to lose his entire right arm and left leg. Despite the injury, he went on to start riding at the age of 15. Primarily a demonstration sport in the Netherlands prior to 1990, he participated in the first international competition in 1991, placing seventh. Stokkel earned the title of overall champion at the 1998 World Riding for Disabled Championships at Hartpury, England.

Stokkel began his athletic career as a swimmer, having first represented the Netherlands at the 1988 Seoul Paralympics, winning two golds and a silver. He later won four Dutch National Championships as well as three golds and two silvers at the 1992 Barcelona Paralympics. He received Dutch Knighthood the same year.
