= Norway at the 2012 Summer Paralympics =

- IPC code: NOR
- NPC: Norwegian Olympic and Paralympic Committee and Confederation of Sports
- Website: www.idrett.no (in Norwegian)

in London
- Competitors: 22 in 9 sports
- Medals Ranked 35th: Gold 3 Silver 2 Bronze 3 Total 8

Summer Paralympics appearances (overview)
- 1960; 1964; 1968; 1972; 1976; 1980; 1984; 1988; 1992; 1996; 2000; 2004; 2008; 2012; 2016; 2020; 2024

Norway competed at the 2012 Summer Paralympics in London, United Kingdom from August 29 to September 9, 2012.

== Medallists ==
Medals by sport
Sport	1st place, gold medalist(s)	2nd place, silver medalist(s)	3rd place, bronze medalist(s)	Total
Swimming	2	2	0	4
Table tennis	1	0	0	1
Athletics	0	0	1	1
Sailing	0	0	1	1
Boccia	0	0	1	1
Total	3	2	3	8

Medal	Name	Sport	Event	Date
Gold	Sarah Louise Rung	Swimming	Women's 200m Freestyle S5	1 September
Gold	Tommy Urhaug	Table Tennis	Men's Individual C5	2 September
Gold	Sarah Louise Rung	Swimming	Women's 50m butterfly S5	7 September
Silver	Sarah Louise Rung	Swimming	Women's 200m Individual Medley SM5	31 August
Silver	Sarah Louise Rung	Swimming	Women's 100m Breaststroke SB4	4 September
Bronze	Per Eugen Kristiansen; Marie Solberg; Aleksander Wang Hansen	Sailing	Sonar	6 September
Bronze	Runar Steinstad	Athletics	Men's Javelin Throw F42	7 September
Bronze	Roger Aandalen	Boccia	Individual BC1	8 September

== Archery ==
Men

Athlete	Event	Ranking round		Round of 32	Round of 16	Quarterfinals	Semifinals	Finals	
Athlete	Event	Score	Seed	Opposition score	Opposition score	Opposition score	Opposition score	Opposition score	Rank
John Olav Johansen	Ind. Compound Open	642	15	Aygan (TUR); L 0–6	did not advance				

== Athletics ==
Men's Field Events

Athlete	Event	Final	
Athlete	Event	Distance	Rank
Runar Steinstad	Javelin Throw F42	48.90	3rd place, bronze medalist(s)

== Boccia ==
Athlete	Event	Seeding Round	Round of 32	Round of 16	Quarterfinals	Semifinals	Final	
Athlete	Event	Opposition Result	Opposition Result	Opposition Result	Opposition Result	Opposition Result	Opposition Result	Rank
Roger Aandalen	Individual BC1	Soulanis (GRE); W 3–3	BYE	Ibarbure (ARG); W 5–1	Fernandes (POR); W 3–3	Smith (GBR); L 2–5	de Oliveria (BRA); W 6–4	3rd place, bronze medalist(s)

== Cycling ==
=== Road ===
Men

Athlete	Event	Time	Rank
Glenn Johansen	Road Race C1-3	1:42:51	9
Glenn Johansen	Time Trial C3	24:09.26	4
Morten Jahr	Road Race C4-5	did not finish	
Morten Jahr	Time Trial C4	38:14.24	14

=== Track ===
Time Trial

Athlete	Event	Time	Rank
Morten Jahr	Men's 1km Time Trial C4-5	1:16.043	20

Individual Pursuit

Athlete	Event	Heats		Final	
Athlete	Event	Time	Rank	Time	Rank
Morten Jahr	Men's Individual Pursuit C4	5:21.436	13	did not advance	

== Equestrian ==
Athlete	Horse	Event	First round	Final round	Total	
Athlete	Horse	Event	Score	Score	Score	Rank
Jens Lasse Dokkan	Leopold	Individual Championship Ib	—N/a		69.000	7
Jens Lasse Dokkan	Leopold	Individual Freestyle Ib	—N/a		68.450	8
Anne Cecilie Ore	Ballantine	Individual Championship III	—N/a		Withdrew	
Anne Cecilie Ore	Ballantine	Individual Freestyle III	—N/a		Withdrew	
Marianne Muri	Fantastico	Individual Championship IV	—N/a		64.097	13
Marianne Muri	Fantastico	Individual Freestyle IV	—N/a		67.000	13
Jens Lasse Dokkan; Anne Cecilie Ore; Marianne Muri	Leopold; Ballantine; Fantastico	Mixed team	65.409; 64.704; 64.906	69.000; 0 (WD); 64.097	328.116	16

== Sailing ==
Athlete	Event	Race											Net points	Rank
Athlete	Event	1	2	3	4	5	6	7	8	9	10	11	Net points	Rank
Bjørnar Erikstad	2.4mR	7	6	10	15	3	(17)	8	8	7	3	CAN	67	8
Per Eugen Kristiansen; Marie Solberg; Aleksander Wang Hansen	Sonar	10	4	5	4	(15)	1	8	1	8	1	CAN	42	3rd place, bronze medalist(s)

== Shooting ==
Athlete	Event	Qualification		Final	
Athlete	Event	Score	Rank	Score	Rank
Bjørn Morten Hagen	Men's 10m Air Pistol SH1	539	29	did not advance	
Bjørn Morten Hagen	Mixed 25m Pistol SH1	559	9	did not advance	
Bjørn Morten Hagen	Mixed 50m Pistol SH1	491	28	did not advance	
Paul Aksel Johansen	Mixed 50m Rifle Prone SH1	576	35	did not advance	
Paul Aksel Johansen	Mixed 10m Air Rifle Prone SH1	592	37	did not advance	
Sonja Tobiassen	Mixed 10m Air Rifle Prone SH2	599	13	did not advance	
Sonja Tobiassen	Mixed 10m Air Rifle Standing SH2	586	26	did not advance	

== Swimming ==
Women

Athletes	Event	Heat		Final	
Athletes	Event	Time	Rank	Time	Rank
Mariann Marthinsen	50m freestyle S8	35.25	17	did not advance	
Mariann Marthinsen	100m freestyle S8	1:16.17	14	did not advance	
Mariann Marthinsen	100m backstroke S8	1:23.05	4 Q	1:22.17	4
Sarah Louise Rung	100m freestyle S5	1:23.98	3 Q	1:23.15	4
Sarah Louise Rung	200m freestyle S5	2:56.22	1 Q	2:49.74	1st place, gold medalist(s)
Sarah Louise Rung	100m breaststroke SB4	1:45.58	2 Q	1:45.68	2nd place, silver medalist(s)
Sarah Louise Rung	50m butterfly S5	42.60	1 Q	41.76	1st place, gold medalist(s)
Sarah Louise Rung	200m individual medley SM5	3:19.59	2 Q	3:15.89	2nd place, silver medalist(s)
Mina Klausen	100m backstroke S7	1:38.75	14	did not advance	
Mina Klausen	100m breaststroke SB7	DSQ		did not advance	
Marianne Fredbo	100m breaststroke SB6	1:58.99	9	did not advance	
Marianne Fredbo	50m butterfly S7	43.41	13	did not advance	

== Table tennis ==
Men

Athlete	Event	Group Stage			Quarterfinals	Semifinals	Final	
Athlete	Event	Opposition Result	Opposition Result	Rank	Opposition Result	Opposition Result	Opposition Result	Rank
Tommy Urhaug	Individual C5	Segatto (BRA); W 3-0	Savant-Aira (FRA); W 3-0	1 Q	—N/a	Jung (KOR); W 3-0	Cao (CHN); W 3-1	1st place, gold medalist(s)
Andreas Aulie	Individual C9	Heijnen (NED); L 2-3	Nozdrunov (RUS); W 3-1	1 Q	Fraczyk (AUT); L 1-3	did not advance		

Women

Athlete	Event	Group Stage				Semifinals	Final	
Athlete	Event	Opposition Result	Opposition Result	Opposition Result	Rank	Opposition Result	Opposition Result	Rank
Aida Dahlen	Individual C8	Rodrigues (BRA); W 3-0	Mao (CHN); L 0-3	Medina (PHI); L 1-3	3	did not advance		

== See also ==
- 2012 Summer Paralympics
- Norway at the Paralympics
- Norway at the 2012 Summer Olympics
