= Norway at the Paralympics =

- IPC code: NOR
- NPC: Norwegian Olympic and Paralympic Committee and Confederation of Sports
- Website: www.idrett.no (in Norwegian)
- Medals Ranked 10th: Gold 256 Silver 213 Bronze 182 Total 651

Summer appearances
- 1960; 1964; 1968; 1972; 1976; 1980; 1984; 1988; 1992; 1996; 2000; 2004; 2008; 2012; 2016; 2020; 2024

Winter appearances
- 1976; 1980; 1984; 1988; 1992; 1994; 1998; 2002; 2006; 2010; 2014; 2018; 2022; 2026

Norway has participated in every edition of both the Summer and Winter Paralympics, except the second Summer Games in 1964. It was one of the seventeen countries to take part in the inaugural Paralympic Games in 1960 in Rome, where it sent a delegation of eleven athletes. Norway was the host country of both the 1980 Winter Paralympics, in Geilo, and the 1994 Winter Paralympics, in Lillehammer.

Norwegian athletes have won a total of 584 Paralympic medals, of which 234 were gold, 194 silver and 156 bronze. 315 of these (including 134 of the gold) have been won at the Winter Games. As of 2010, Norway is the most successful country of all time at the Winter Paralympics, and ranks twelfth on the all-time Paralympic Games medal table (for Summer and Winter Games combined).

Norway has topped the medal chart on four occasions at the Winter Games: in 1980, 1988, 1994 and 1998. It finished in the top ten in every edition of the Winter Games until 2002, included, then dropped to 12th in 2006 and 2010.

Norway boasts some of the world’s most successful Winter Paralympians of all time:

- Ragnhild Myklebust has won medals in every event she has ever participated in, in cross-country skiing, ice sledge speed racing and biathlon. Between 1988 and 2002, she won 27 medals, of which 22 were gold, 3 silver, and 2 bronze.
- Cato Zahl Pedersen has represented Norway at both the Summer and Winter Paralympics. He competed in both in 1980, making a perfect Paralympic début by entering four events in athletics, three in alpine skiing, one in cross-country skiing, and winning gold in all seven. Between 1980 and 1994, he won 14 medals in these sports, of which 13 were gold and 1 silver.
- Erling Trondsen competed in swimming from 1976 to 1992. He swam in 22 events, and won medals in 20 of them: 13 gold, 6 silver, and 1 bronze.
- Terje Loevaas took part in 13 events in cross-country skiing between 1980 and 1994, and won medals in all of them: 10 gold and 3 silver. During the same period, he also won 5 medals in athletics: 2 silver and 3 bronze.

== Medals ==
=== Summer Paralympics ===
Event	Gold	Silver	Bronze	Total	Ranking
1960 Summer Paralympics	9	3	4	16	6th
1964 Summer Paralympics	did not participate				
1968 Summer Paralympics	5	3	1	9	13th
1972 Summer Paralympics	1	5	4	10	22nd
1976 Summer Paralympics	9	6	4	19	16th
1980 Summer Paralympics	15	13	8	36	10th
1984 Summer Paralympics	30	30	30	90	10th
1988 Summer Paralympics	11	11	15	37	23rd
1992 Summer Paralympics	13	13	7	33	12nd
1996 Summer Paralympics	9	7	4	20	17th
2000 Summer Paralympics	2	6	7	15	40th
2004 Summer Paralympics	3	1	1	5	38th
2008 Summer Paralympics	1	3	3	7	43rd
2012 Summer Paralympics	3	2	3	8	35th
2016 Summer Paralympics	3	2	3	8	32nd
2020 Summer Paralympics	2	0	2	4	47th
2024 Summer Paralympics	1	3	3	7	54th
Total	117	108	99	324	20

=== Winter Paralympics ===
Event	Gold	Silver	Bronze	Total	Ranking
1976 Winter Paralympics	7	3	2	12	4th
1980 Winter Paralympics	23	21	10	54	1st
1984 Winter Paralympics	15	13	13	41	3rd
1988 Winter Paralympics	25	21	14	60	1st
1992 Winter Paralympics	5	5	4	14	7th
1994 Winter Paralympics	29	22	13	64	1st
1998 Winter Paralympics	18	9	13	40	1st
2002 Winter Paralympics	10	3	6	19	3rd
2006 Winter Paralympics	1	1	3	5	12th
2010 Winter Paralympics	1	3	2	6	12th
2014 Winter Paralympics	1	2	1	4	11th
2018 Winter Paralympics	1	3	4	8	14th
2022 Winter Paralympics	4	2	1	7	8th
2026 Winter Paralympics	2	4	2	7	12th
Total	142	112	88	342	1

== Multi-medalists ==
Norwegian athletes who have won at least three gold medals or five or more medals of any colour.

=== Summer Games ===
No.	Athlete	Sport	Years	Games	Gender	Gold	Silver	Bronze	Total
1	Erling Trondsen	Swimming	1976-1992	5	M	13	6	1	20
2	Sarah Louise Rung	Swimming	2012-2016	2	F	4	3	2	9
3	Eva Nesheim	Swimming	1992-1996	2	F	4	3	0	7
4	Helge Bjørnstad	Swimming	1992-1996	2	M	4	2	0	6
5	Ann Cathrin Lübbe	Equestrian	2004-2020	5	F	3	3	2	8
6	Mona Ullmann	Athletics	1984-1992	3	F	2	3	6	11
7	Anne Cecilie Ore	Equestrian	1996-2000, 2012	3	F	2	2	1	5

=== Winter Games ===
No.	Athlete	Sport	Years	Games	Gender	Gold	Silver	Bronze	Total
1	Ragnhild Myklebust	Biathlon; Cross-country skiing Ice sledge speed racing	1988-2002	5	F	22	3	2	27
2	Knut Lundstrøm	Cross-country skiing Ice sledge speed racing	1988-1998	4	M	14	5	2	21
3	Britt Mjaasund Øyen	Cross-country skiing Ice sledge speed racing	1980-1984, 1994	3	F	10	3	1	14
4	Hans Aalien	Cross-country skiing	1980-1988	3	M	7	1	1	9
5	Cato Zahl Pedersen	Alpine skiing Cross-country skiing	1980-1994	4	M	7	1	0	8
6	Svein Lilleberg	Biathlon	1984-1998, 2006	6	M	4	7	1	12
7	Erik Sandbraathen	Cross-country skiing Ice sledge speed racing Para ice hockey	1980-2002	6	M	5	7	2	14
8	Jesper Pedersen	Alpine skiing	2018-2022	2	M	5	1	1	7
9	Tone Gravvold	Cross-country skiing	1994-2006	4	F	4	1	3	8
10	Kjartan Haugen	Cross-country skiing	1998-2006, 2022	4	M	2	1	3	6
11	Eskil Hagen	Para ice hockey	1994-2014	6	M	1	3	1	5

== See also ==
- Norway at the Olympics
