= Norway at the 2016 Summer Paralympics =

- IPC code: NOR
- NPC: Norwegian Olympic and Paralympic Committee and Confederation of Sports
- Website: www.idrett.no (in Norwegian)

in Rio de Janeiro
- Competitors: 25 in 10 sports
- Flag bearer: Bjørnar Erikstad
- Medals Ranked 32nd: Gold 3 Silver 2 Bronze 3 Total 8

Summer Paralympics appearances (overview)
- 1960; 1964; 1968; 1972; 1976; 1980; 1984; 1988; 1992; 1996; 2000; 2004; 2008; 2012; 2016; 2020; 2024

Norway competed at the 2016 Summer Paralympics in Rio de Janeiro, Brazil, from 7 September to 18 September 2016. They won a total of eight medals; three gold, two silver and three bronze. Sarah Louise Rung led the team by winning five medals in swimming; two gold, one silver and two bronze.

== Disability classifications ==
Every participant at the Paralympics has their disability grouped into one of five disability categories; amputation, the condition may be congenital or sustained through injury or illness; cerebral palsy; wheelchair athletes, there is often overlap between this and other categories; visual impairment, including blindness; Les autres, any physical disability that does not fall strictly under one of the other categories, for example dwarfism or multiple sclerosis. Each Paralympic sport then has its own classifications, dependent upon the specific physical demands of competition. Events are given a code, made of numbers and letters, describing the type of event and classification of the athletes competing. Some sports, such as athletics, divide athletes by both the category and severity of their disabilities, other sports, for example swimming, group competitors from different categories together, the only separation being based on the severity of the disability.

== Medallists ==
Medal	Name	Sport	Event	Date
Gold	Sarah Louise Rung	Swimming	Women's 100 m breaststroke SB4	11 September
Gold	Ann Cathrin Lubbe	Equestrian	Individual Championship test grade III	13 September
Gold	Sarah Louise Rung	Swimming	Women's 200 m individual medley SM5	15 September
Silver	Sarah Louise Rung	Swimming	Women's 50 metre butterfly S5	10 September
Silver	Ann Cathrin Lubbe	Equestrian	Individual Freestyle test grade III	16 September
Bronze	Sarah Louise Rung	Swimming	Women's 200 metre freestyle S5	8 September
Bronze	Andreas Skår Bjørnstad	Swimming	Men's 400 m freestyle S7	14 September
Bronze	Sarah Louise Rung	Swimming	50 m backstroke S5	16 September

Medals by sport
Sport	Gold medal	Silver medal	Bronze medal	Total
Swimming	2	1	3	6
Equestrian	1	1	0	2
Total	3	2	3	8

== Archery ==
Athlete	Event	Ranking round		Round of 32	Round of 16	Quarterfinals	Semifinals	Finals	
Athlete	Event	Score	Seed	Opposition score	Opposition score	Opposition score	Opposition score	Opposition score	Rank
Morten Johannessen	Men's individual compound open	648	24	Milne (AUS); L 136–143	did not advance				17

== Athletics ==
Athlete	Event	Heat		Final	
Athlete	Event	Result	Rank	Result	Rank
Ida Yessica Nesse	Women's discus throw F44	—N/a		27.08	7
Runar Steinstad	Men's javelin throw F44	—N/a		50.78	11

== Boccia ==
Athlete	Event	Group				Quarterfinals	Semifinals	Final	Rank
Athlete	Event	Opposition Result	Opposition Result	Opposition Result	Rank	Opposition Result	Opposition Result	Opposition Result	Rank
Roger Aandalen	Individual BC1	Curinova (CZE); L 2–3	Yoo (KOR); L 2–7	Perez (NED); L 0–11	4	did not advance			15

== Cycling ==
=== Road ===
Athlete	Event	Time	Rank
Glenn Johansen	Men's road race C3	2:00:56	25
Glenn Johansen	Men's time trial C3	45:47.58	13

== Equestrian ==
The country qualified to participate in the team event at the Rio Games.

Individual

Athlete	Horse	Event	Final	
Athlete	Horse	Event	Result	Rank
Jens Lasse Dokkan	Cypres	Individual Championship test grade Ia	70.087	9
Heidi Løken	Armano	Individual Championship test grade IV	62.333	7
Heidi Løken	Armano	Individual Freestyle test grade IV	66.900	6
Ann Cathrin Lubbe	Donatello	Individual Championship test grade III	72.878	1st place, gold medalist(s)
Ann Cathrin Lubbe	Donatello	Individual Freestyle test grade III	73.800	2nd place, silver medalist(s)
Birgitte Reitan	Steffi Graf	Individual Championship test grade Ia	68.130	13

Team

Athlete	Horse	Event	Individual score			Total	
Athlete	Horse	Event	TT	CT	Total	Score	Rank
Jens Lasse Dokkan	See above	Team	70.652	70.087	140.739	422.375	6
Heidi Løken	See above	Team	64.238 #	62.333 #	126.571	422.375	6
Ann Cathrin Lubbe	See above	Team	72.237	72.878	145.115	422.375	6
Birgitte Reitan	See above	Team	68.391	68.130	136.521	422.375	6

"#" indicates that the score of this rider does not count in the team competition, since only the best three results of a team are counted.

== Rowing ==
One pathway for qualifying for Rio involved having a boat have top eight finish at the 2015 FISA World Rowing Championships in a medal event. Norway qualified for the 2016 Games under this criterion in the AS Women's Single Sculls event with a third-place finish in a time of 05:31.940.

Athlete(s)	Event	Heats		Repechage		Final	
Athlete(s)	Event	Time	Rank	Time	Rank	Time	Rank
Birgit Skarstein	Women's single sculls	5:26.07	3 R	5:28.28	1 FA	5:25.04	4

Qualification Legend: FA=Final A (medal); FB=Final B (non-medal); R=Repechage

== Sailing ==
Norway qualified a boat for two of the three sailing classes at the Games through their results at the 2014 Disabled Sailing World Championships held in Halifax, Nova Scotia, Canada. Places were earned in the solo 2.4mR event and a crew also qualified for the three-person Sonar class.

Athlete	Event	Race											Net points	Final rank
Athlete	Event	1	2	3	4	5	6	7	8	9	10	M*	Net points	Final rank
Bjørnar Erikstad	2.4mR	4	7	1	4	~~11~~	8	3	8	5	9	3	52	5
Per Eugen Kristiansen; Marie Solberg; Aleksander Wang-Hansen	Sonar	5	10	2	3	4	8	9	4	3	~~11~~	6	54	5

== Shooting ==
The first opportunity to qualify for shooting at the Rio Games took place at the 2014 IPC Shooting World Championships in Suhl. Shooters earned spots for their NPC. Norway earned a qualifying spot at this event in the R6 – 50m Air Pistol Mixed SH1 event as a result of the performance Ove Foss. Norway also earned a spot in the R5 – 10m Air Rifle Prone Mixed SH2 based on Heidi Kristin Sørlie-Rogne's performance. Norway's third spot was earned by Sonja Jennie Tobiassen in the R4 – 10m Air Rifle Standing Mixed SH2 event. Amanda Dybendal earned Norway's third spot for women and fourth overall after her performance in the R5 – 10m Air Rifle Prone Mixed SH2 event.

The last direct qualifying event for Rio in shooting took place at the 2015 IPC Shooting World Cup in Fort Benning in November. Monica Lillehagen earned a qualifying spot for their country at this competition in the R2 Women's 10m Air Rifle Standing SH1 event.

Athlete	Event	Qualification		Semifinal		Final	
Athlete	Event	Points	Rank	Points	Rank	Points	Rank
Amanda Dybendal	Mixed 10 m air rifle prone SH1	626.5	30	—N/a		did not advance	
Amanda Dybendal	Mixed 50 m air rifle prone SH1	606.9	27	—N/a		did not advance	
Paul Aksel Johansen	Mixed 10 m air rifle prone SH1	627.2	28	—N/a		did not advance	
Paul Aksel Johansen	Mixed 50 m air rifle prone SH1	611.3	16	—N/a		did not advance	
Anne-Cathrine Kruger	Women's 10 m air pistol SH1	362-5x	10	—N/a		did not advance	
Anne-Cathrine Kruger	Mixed 25 m pistol SH1	522-6x	29	did not advance			
Monica Lillehagen	Mixed 10 m air rifle prone SH1	618.5	41	—N/a		did not advance	
Monica Lillehagen	Women's 10 m air rifle standing SH1	402.9	8 Q	—N/a		119.3	6
Monica Lillehagen	Women's 50 m rifle 3 positions SH1	547-11x	13	—N/a		did not advance	
Heidi Kristin Sørlie-Rogne	Mixed 10 m air rifle prone SH2	629.2	19	—N/a		did not advance	
Sonja Jennie Tobiassen	Mixed 10 m air rifle prone SH2	627.7	25	—N/a		did not advance	
Sonja Jennie Tobiassen	Mixed 10 m air rifle standing SH2	624.0	21	—N/a		did not advance	

== Swimming ==
Men

Athlete	Event	Heat		Final	
Athlete	Event	Result	Rank	Result	Rank
Andreas Skår Bjørnstad	400 m freestyle S7	4:59.23	4 Q	4:53.61	3rd place, bronze medalist(s)
Andreas Skår Bjørnstad	50 m butterfly S7	34.77	12	did not advance	
Andreas Skår Bjørnstad	100 m breaststroke SB6	1:28.78	4 Q	1:26.07	4
Andreas Skår Bjørnstad	200 m individual medley SM7	2:50.76	8 Q	2:48.06	8
Adam Ismael Wenham	200 m freestyle S14	2:07.56	15	did not advance	
Adam Ismael Wenham	100 m breaststroke SB14	1:09.59	5 Q	1:08.44	5
Adam Ismael Wenham	200 m individual medley SM14	2:22.85	15	did not advance	

Women

Athlete	Event	Heat		Final	
Athlete	Event	Result	Rank	Result	Rank
Sarah Louise Rung	50 m freestyle S5	41.68	7 Q	40.42	7
Sarah Louise Rung	100 m freestyle S5	1:26.41	6 Q	1:25.04	6
Sarah Louise Rung	200 m freestyle S5	2:54.73	1 Q	2:51.37	3rd place, bronze medalist(s)
Sarah Louise Rung	50 m backstroke S5	49.37	6	45.40	3rd place, bronze medalist(s)
Sarah Louise Rung	50 m butterfly S5	50.63	7 Q	45.67	2nd place, silver medalist(s)
Sarah Louise Rung	100 m breaststroke SB4	1:45.46	1 Q	1:44.94	1st place, gold medalist(s)
Sarah Louise Rung	200 m individual medley SM5	3:19.54	1 Q	3:15.83	1st place, gold medalist(s)

== Table tennis ==
Men

Athlete	Event	Group			Round of 16	Quarterfinals	Semifinals	Final	Rank
Athlete	Event	Opposition Result	Opposition Result	Rank	Opposition Result	Opposition Result	Opposition Result	Opposition Result	Rank
Tommy Urhaug	Singles class 5	Fetir (EGY); W 3–0	Savant Aira (FRA); W 3–0	1 Q	Bye	Cheng (TPE); W 3–1	Cao (CHN); L 0–3	Palikuca (SRB); L 1–3	4

Women

Athlete	Event	Group			Round of 16	Quarterfinals	Semifinals	Final	Rank
Athlete	Event	Opposition Result	Opposition Result	Rank	Opposition Result	Opposition Result	Opposition Result	Opposition Result	Rank
Aida Husic Dahlen	Singles class 8	Mao (CHN); L 0–3	Medina (PHI); L 2–3	3	—N/a		did not advance		

== See also ==
- Norway at the 2016 Summer Olympics
