= Jayne Craike =

New Zealand Paralympian

Jayne Craike MNZM
Personal information
- Born: 21 September 1961 (age 64)

Sport
- Country: New Zealand
- Sport: Equestrian
- Event: Dressage

Achievements and titles
- World finals: 1999 World Para equestrian Games - MedalSilver Mixed Dressage - Grade IV
Medal record
Para equestrian
Representing New Zealand
Paralympic Games
Gold medal – first place	2000 Sydney	Mixed Dressage – Championship Grade IV
Silver medal – second place	2000 Sydney	Mixed Dressage – Freestyle Grade IV

Jayne Craike MNZM (born 21 September 1961) is a New Zealand para-equestrian. At the 2000 Summer Paralympics, she won a gold medal in the Mixed Dressage – Championship Grade IV, and a silver medal in the Mixed Dressage – Freestyle Grade IV. She also competed at the 1996 and 2004 Summer Paralympics.

in the 2001 New Year Honours, Craike was appointed a Member of the New Zealand Order of Merit, for services to equestrian sport.
