= Norway at the 1984 Summer Paralympics =

- IPC code: NOR
- NPC: Norwegian Olympic and Paralympic Committee and Confederation of Sports
- Website: www.idrett.no (in Norwegian)

in Stoke Mandeville/New York
- Competitors: 64 in 7 sports
- Medals Ranked 10th: Gold 30 Silver 30 Bronze 30 Total 90

Summer Paralympics appearances (overview)
- 1960; 1964; 1968; 1972; 1976; 1980; 1984; 1988; 1992; 1996; 2000; 2004; 2008; 2012; 2016; 2020; 2024

Norway competed at the 1984 Summer Paralympics in Stoke Mandeville, Great Britain and New York City, United States. 64 competitors from Norway won 90 medals including 30 gold, 30 silver and 30 bronze, and finished 10th in the medal table.

== Medalists ==
=== Gold medalists ===
Medal	Name	Sport	Event
Gold	Kjell Løvvold	Archery	Men's double FITA round division 3
Gold	Cato Zahl Pedersen	Athletics	Men's 1500m A5
Gold	Cato Zahl Pedersen	Athletics	Men's 5000m A5
Gold	Lauritz Ellefsen	Athletics	Men's club throw L1
Gold	Ragnar Anundsen	Athletics	Men's discus throw C4
Gold	Bjorn Tangen	Athletics	Men's discus throw C7
Gold	Lauritz Ellefsen	Athletics	Men's discus throw L1
Gold	Terje Hansen	Athletics	Men's javelin throw B1
Gold	Bjorn Tangen	Athletics	Men's javelin throw C7
Gold	Jone Grant Malmin	Athletics	Men's pentathlon 3
Gold	Tone Karlsen	Athletics	Women's javelin throw C6
Gold	Mona Ullmann	Athletics	Women's pentathlon B3
Gold	Morten Fromyr	Cycling	Men's bicycle 1500m CP div 3
Gold	Morten Fromyr	Cycling	Men's bicycle 5000m CP div 3
Gold	Johnny Kuiserud	Cycling	Men's tricycle 1500m CP div 2
Gold	Stig Osland	Swimming	Men's 50m freestyle C7
Gold	Erling Trondsen	Swimming	Men's 100m backstroke A3
Gold	Erling Trondsen	Swimming	Men's 100m breaststroke A3
Gold	Erling Trondsen	Swimming	Men's 100m butterfly A3
Gold	Erling Trondsen	Swimming	Men's 100m freestyle A3
Gold	Stig Osland	Swimming	Men's 100m freestyle C7
Gold	Stig Osland	Swimming	Men's 200m freestyle C7
Gold	Erling Trondsen	Swimming	Men's 200m individual medley A3
Gold	Vibeke Hagen	Swimming	Women's 50m freestyle C4
Gold	H. Pettersen	Swimming	Women's 100m backstroke 6
Gold	H. Pettersen	Swimming	Women's 100m butterfly 6
Gold	H. Pettersen	Swimming	Women's 100m freestyle 6
Gold	Vibeke Hagen	Swimming	Women's 100m freestyle C4
Gold	Vibeke Hagen	Swimming	Women's 200m freestyle C4
Gold	H. Pettersen	Swimming	Women's 400m freestyle 6

=== Silver medalists ===
Medal	Name	Sport	Event
Silver	Tofiri Kibuuka	Athletics	Men's 800m B1
Silver	Tofiri Kibuuka	Athletics	Men's 1500m B1
Silver	Sverre Fuglerud	Athletics	Men's 1500m B2
Silver	Tofiri Kibuuka	Athletics	Men's 5000m B1
Silver	Odd Lovseth	Athletics	Men's triple jump A6
Silver	Ragnar Anundsen	Athletics	Men's club throw C4
Silver	Mons Skjelvik	Athletics	Men's javelin throw C4
Silver	Jone Grant Malmin	Athletics	Men's shot put 3
Silver	Jan Bengston	Athletics	Men's shot put B1
Silver	Mons Skjelvik	Athletics	Men's shot put C4
Silver	Tone Karlsen	Athletics	Women's discus throw C6
Silver	Mona Ullmann	Athletics	Women's javelin throw B3
Silver	Birte Oddny Larsen	Athletics	Women's shot put C7
Silver	Johnny Kuiserud	Cycling	Men's tricycle 3000m CP div 2
Silver	Tom Pedersen	Equestrian	Dressage - Advanced walk/trot C7
Silver	Mixed team	Equestrian	Obstacle course - relay race open
Silver	Tom Nordtvedt	Swimming	Men's 50m backstroke A9
Silver	Per Ove Alsethaug	Swimming	Men's 50m freestyle C5
Silver	Kare Adler	Swimming	Men's 100m backstroke C4
Silver	Tom Bruer	Swimming	Men's 100m breaststroke L6
Silver	J. P. Sandbraaten	Swimming	Men's 100m freestyle 1A
Silver	M. Klaeth	Swimming	Women's 25m backstroke 1C
Silver	M. Klaeth	Swimming	Women's 25m freestyle 1C
Silver	Vibeke Hagen	Swimming	Women's 100m backstroke C4
Silver	Maj Berger	Swimming	Women's 100m breaststroke L4
Silver	Maj Britt Mastad	Swimming	Women's 200m individual medley A1
Silver	Helen Bendiksen	Swimming	Women's 200m individual medley B3
Silver	H. Pettersen	Swimming	Women's 4x50m individual medley 6
Silver	Marit Lysen	Table tennis	Women's singles 1B
Silver	E. Nesset	Table tennis	Women's singles C4-5

=== Bronze medalists ===
Medal	Name	Sport	Event
Bronze	Oddbjorn Stebekk	Archery	Men's double FITA round tetraplegic
Bronze	Joerund Gaasemyr	Athletics	Men's 5000m B1
Bronze	Terje Loevaas	Athletics	Men's 5000m B2
Bronze	Jone Grant Malmin	Athletics	Men's discus throw 3
Bronze	Jone Grant Malmin	Athletics	Men's javelin throw 3
Bronze	Lauritz Ellefsen	Athletics	Men's shot put L1
Bronze	Svein Andersen	Athletics	Men's pentathlon B1
Bronze	Mona Ullmann	Athletics	Women's long jump B3
Bronze	Tone Karlsen	Athletics	Women's club throw C6
Bronze	Birte Oddny Larsen	Athletics	Women's javelin throw C7
Bronze	Mona Ullmann	Athletics	Women's shot put B3
Bronze	Tone Karlsen	Athletics	Women's shot put C6
Bronze	Lauritz Ellefsen	Swimming	Men's 25m backstroke L1
Bronze	Tom Nordtvedt	Swimming	Men's 50m breaststroke A9
Bronze	Idar Hunstad	Swimming	Men's 100m backstroke B2
Bronze	Hans Anton Aalien	Swimming	Men's 100m breaststroke B1
Bronze	Tom Bruer	Swimming	Men's 100m freestyle L6
Bronze	Tom Nordtvedt	Swimming	Men's 150m individual medley A9
Bronze	Kare Adler	Swimming	Men's 200m freestyle C4
Bronze	Bente Gronli	Swimming	Women's 50m butterfly 4
Bronze	Maj Britt Mastad	Swimming	Women's 100m backstroke A1
Bronze	Mona Hovik	Swimming	Women's 100m breaststroke A2
Bronze	Helen Bendiksen	Swimming	Women's 100m breaststroke B3
Bronze	Helen Bendiksen	Swimming	Women's 100m butterfly B3
Bronze	Bente Gronli	Swimming	Women's 400m freestyle 4
Bronze	Helen Bendiksen	Swimming	Women's 400m freestyle B3
Bronze	Women's relay team	Swimming	Women's 4x50m freestyle relay L1-L6
Bronze	Bente Gronli	Swimming	Women's 4x50m individual medley 4
Bronze	Women's relay team	Swimming	Women's 4x50m medley relay L1-L6
Bronze	K. Naess	Table tennis	Women's singles L4

== See also ==
- Norway at the Paralympics
- Norway at the 1984 Summer Olympics
