= Archery at the 1984 Summer Paralympics – Men's double FITA round tetraplegic =

Men's double FITA round tetraplegic at the VII Paralympic Games
- Paralympic Archery
- Competitors: 3 from 3 nations

Medalists
1st place, gold medalist(s)		Felix Lettner	Austria
2nd place, silver medalist(s)		K. Koneman	Netherlands
3rd place, bronze medalist(s)		Oddbjorn Stebekk	Norway

The Men's double FITA round tetraplegic was an archery competition at the 1984 Summer Paralympics.

The Austrian archer Felix Lettner won the gold medal.

== Results ==
Rank	Athlete	Points
1st place, gold medalist(s)	Felix Lettner (AUT)	2093
2nd place, silver medalist(s)	K. Koneman (NED)	1712
3rd place, bronze medalist(s)	Oddbjorn Stebekk (NOR)	172
