= Bolmer =

Bolmer is a surname. Notable people with the surname include:

- Brandon Bolmer (born 1986), American vocalist
- Gert Bolmer (born 1983), Dutch dressage rider
