= Archery at the 1992 Summer Paralympics – Men's individual AR1 =

Men's individual AR1 at the IX Paralympic Games
- Paralympic Archery
- Venue: Camp Olímpic de Tir amb Arc
- Dates: September 1992
- Competitors: 10 from 8 nations

Medalists
1st place, gold medalist(s)		Koichi Minami	Japan
2nd place, silver medalist(s)		Richard Spizzirri	United States
3rd place, bronze medalist(s)		Giampiero Mercandelli	Italy

The Men's Individual AR1 was an archery competition in the 1992 Summer Paralympics.

Gold medalist, Koichi Minami, set a world record in the qualifying round. In the final he beat the US archer Richard Spizzirri.

== Results ==
=== Qualifying round ===
Rank	Archer	Points	Notes
1	Koichi Minami (JPN)	1186	WR
2	Walter Williams (USA)	1150	
3	Martti Rantavouri (FIN)	1098	
4	Giampiero Mercandelli (ITA)	1052	
5	Hannu Airaksinen (FIN)	1032	
6	Oddbjorn Stebekk (NOR)	933	
7	Richard Spizzirri (USA)	912	
8	Kurt MacCaferri (SUI)	890	
9	Ernest Arnold (GBR)	868	
10	Reiner Schneider (GER)	750	

=== Finals ===
Quarter-finals
1	Koichi Minami (JPN)	96
8	Kurt MacCaferri (SUI)	63
5	Hannu Airaksinen (FIN)	78
4	Giampiero Mercandelli (ITA)	79
3	Martti Rantavouri (FIN)	90
6	Oddbjorn Stebekk (NOR)	92
7	Richard Spizzirri (USA)	91
2	Walter Williams (USA)	71

Semi-finals
1	Koichi Minami (JPN)	91
4	Giampiero Mercandelli (ITA)	86
6	Oddbjorn Stebekk (NOR)	64
7	Richard Spizzirri (USA)	92

Gold medal match
1	Koichi Minami (JPN)	96
7	Richard Spizzirri (USA)	90
Bronze medal match
4	Giampiero Mercandelli (ITA)	92
6	Oddbjorn Stebekk (NOR)	67
