= Norway at the 2024 Summer Paralympics =

- Flag of Norway
- IPC code: NOR
- NPC: Norwegian Olympic and Paralympic Committee and Confederation of Sports
- Website: www.idrett.no (in Norwegian)

in Paris, 2024 August 28, 2024 – September 8, 2024
- Competitors: 13 in 7 sports
- Flag bearers: Salum Ageze Kashafali; Ida Nesse
- Medals Ranked 54th: Gold 1 Silver 3 Bronze 3 Total 7

Summer Paralympics appearances (overview)
- 1960; 1964; 1968; 1972; 1976; 1980; 1984; 1988; 1992; 1996; 2000; 2004; 2008; 2012; 2016; 2020; 2024

Norway competed at the 2024 Summer Paralympics in Paris, France, from 28 August to 8 September.

== Medalists ==
The following Norwegian competitors won medals at the games. In the discipline sections below, the medalists' names are bolded.

Medal	Name	Sport	Event	Date
Gold	Tommy Urhaug	Table tennis	Men's individual – Class 5	3 September
Silver	Salum Kashafali	Athletics	Men's 100 metres T13	1 September
Silver	Birgit Skarstein	Rowing	Women's PR1	1 September
Silver	Aida Dahlen	Table tennis	Women's Individual Class 8	7 September
Bronze	Aida Dahlen; Merethe Tveiten	Table tennis	Women's doubles WD14	29 August
Bronze	Helle Sofie Sagøy	Badminton	Women's singles SL4	2 September
Bronze	Fredrik Solberg	Swimming	Men's 50 metre freestyle S9	2 September

Medals by sport
Sport	1st place, gold medalist(s)	2nd place, silver medalist(s)	3rd place, bronze medalist(s)	Total
Table tennis	1	1	1	**3**
Athletics	0	1	0	**1**
Rowing	0	1	0	**1**
Badminton	0	0	1	**1**
Swimming	0	0	1	**1**
Total	1	3	3	7

Medals by day
Day	Date	1st place, gold medalist(s)	2nd place, silver medalist(s)	3rd place, bronze medalist(s)	Total
1	29 August	0	0	1	**1**
2	30 August	0	0	0	**0**
3	31 August	0	0	0	**0**
4	1 September	0	2	0	**2**
5	2 September	0	0	2	**2**
6	3 September	1	0	0	**1**
7	4 September	0	0	0	**0**
8	5 September	0	0	0	**0**
9	6 September	0	0	0	**0**
10	7 September	0	1	0	**1**
11	8 September	0	0	0	**0**
Total		1	3	3	7

Medals by gender
Gender	1st place, gold medalist(s)	2nd place, silver medalist(s)	3rd place, bronze medalist(s)	Total
Male	1	1	1	**3**
Female	0	2	2	**4**
Total	1	3	3	7

== Competitors ==
The following is the list of number of competitors in the Games.

Sport	Men	Women	Total
Athletics	1	0	1
Badminton	0	1	1
Cycling	1	1	2
Equestrian	TBD	TBD	4
Rowing	0	1	1
Swimming	1	0	1
Table tennis	1	2	3
Total	4	5	13

== Athletics ==
Norwegian track and field athletes achieved quota places for the following events based on their results at the 2023 World Championships, 2024 World Championships, or through high performance allocation, as long as they meet the minimum entry standard (MES).

Key

- Note–Ranks given for track events are within the athlete's heat only
- Q = Qualified for the next round
- q = Qualified for the next round as a fastest loser or, in field events, by position without achieving the qualifying target
- DQ = Disqualified
- PR = Paralympic Record
- AR = Area (or continental) Record
- NR = National Record
- SB = Season's Best
- N/A = Round not applicable for the event
- Bye = Athlete not required to compete in round

Men's track

Athlete	Event	Heat		Final	
Athlete	Event	Result	Rank	Result	Rank
Salum Ageze Kashafali	100 m T13	10.47	2	10.57	2nd place, silver medalist(s)
Vegard Sverd	100 m T13	11.20	9	Did not advance	

Men's field

Athlete	Event	Final	
Athlete	Event	Result	Rank
Vegard Sverd	Long jump T13	NM	-

Women's field

Athlete	Event	Final	
Athlete	Event	Result	Rank
Ida Yessica Nesse	Discus throw F64	32.73	9

== Badminton ==
Norway has qualified one para badminton player for the following events, through the release of BWF para-badminton Race to Paris Paralympic Ranking.

Athlete	Event	Group Stage				Semifinal	Final / BM	
Athlete	Event	Opposition Score	Opposition Score	Opposition Score	Rank	Opposition Score	Opposition Score	Rank
Helle Sofie Sagøy	Women's singles SL4							

== Cycling ==
Norway entered two para-cyclists (one in each gender) after finished the top eligible nation's at the 2022 UCI Nation's ranking allocation ranking.

== Equestrian ==
Norway entered a full squad of four para-equestrians into the Paralympic equestrian competition, as one of the top two teams, not yet qualified, through final world para dressage rankings.

Individual

Athlete	Horse	Event	Total	
Athlete	Horse	Event	Score	Rank
Christina Marcussen	Zorro Hoejris	Individual championship test grade V		
Christina Marcussen	Zorro Hoejris	Individual freestyle test grade V		
Anita Hennie Johnnsen	Lindegaard Lucky	Individual championship test grade IV		
Anita Hennie Johnnsen	Lindegaard Lucky	Individual freestyle test grade IV		
Kirsten Kristine Vik	Bonfire	Individual championship test grade V		
Kirsten Kristine Vik	Bonfire	Individual freestyle test grade V		
Jens Lasse Dokkan	Aladdin	Individual championship test grade I		
Jens Lasse Dokkan	Aladdin	Individual freestyle test grade I		

Team

Athlete	Horse	Event	Individual score	Total	
Athlete	Horse	Event	TT	Score	Rank
Christina Marcussen	See above	Team			
Anita Hennie Johnnsen	See above	Team			
Kirsten Kristine Vik	See above	Team			
Jens Lasse Dokkan	See above	Team			

== Rowing ==
Norwegian rowers qualified boats in each of the following classes at the 2023 World Rowing Championships in Belgrade, Serbia.

Athlete	Event	Heats		Repechage		Final	
Athlete	Event	Time	Rank	Time	Rank	Time	Rank
Birgit Skarstein	PR1 women's single sculls	10:13.55	2 R	10:40.46	1 FA		

Qualification Legend: FA=Final A (medal); FB=Final B (non-medal); R=Repechage

== Swimming ==
Norway secured one quotas at the 2023 World Para Swimming Championships after finishing in the top two places in Paralympic class disciplines.

Athlete	Event	Heats		Final	
Athlete	Event	Result	Rank	Result	Rank
Fredrik Solberg	Men's 50 m freestyle S9	25.26	2	25.33	3rd place, bronze medalist(s)

== Table tennis ==
Norway secure three singles spot for the Paralympic games. Aida Dahlen qualified for the games by virtue of her gold medal results, through the 2023 European Para Championships held in Sheffield, Great Britain; meanwhile the other athletes qualified for the games through the allocations of ITTF final world ranking.

Athlete	Event	Group Stage				Quarterfinals	Semifinals	Final / BM	
Athlete	Event	Opposition Result	Opposition Result	Opposition Result	Rank	Opposition Result	Opposition Result	Opposition Result	Rank
Tommy Urhaug	Men's individual C5								
Nora Korneliussen	Women's individual C7								
Aida Dahlen	Women's individual C8								
Aida Husic Dahl; Merethe Tveiten	Women's doubles WD14	Elsayed / Hammad (EGY); W 3–0							

== See also ==
- Norway at the 2024 Summer Olympics
- Norway at the Paralympics
