= Equestrian at the 2016 Summer Paralympics – Individual championship test grade Ia =

Equestrian – Individual championship test, grade Ia at the XV Paralympic Games
- Venue: Olympic Equestrian Centre
- Date: 15 September 2016
- Competitors: 26 from 19 nations
- Winning score: 78.217

Medalists
1st place, gold medalist(s)		Sophie Christiansen	Great Britain
2nd place, silver medalist(s)		Anne Dunham	Great Britain
3rd place, bronze medalist(s)		Sérgio Fróes Oliva	Brazil

The individual championship test, grade Ia, para-equestrian dressage event at the 2016 Summer Paralympics was contested on the afternoon of 15 September 2016 at the Olympic Equestrian Centre in Rio de Janeiro.

The competition was assessed by a ground jury composed of five judges placed at locations designated E, H, C, M, and B. Each judge rated the competitors' performances with a percentage score. The five scores from the jury were then averaged to determine a rider's total percentage score.

Sophie Christiansen of Great Britain defended her title, holding off 2008 Champion and compatriot Anne Dunham. This was Christensen's 4th medal in the event, having also won a silver behind Dunham in 2008, and a bronze in 2004.

== Results ==
Individual championship test - Class 1a
Rank	Rider	Horse	Team	Scores					Final Total
Rank	Rider	Horse	Team	E	H	C	M	B	Final Total
1st place, gold medalist(s)	Sophie Christiansen	on ATHENE LINDEBJERG	Great Britain	78.478	76.522	77.826	79.565	78.696	78.217
2nd place, silver medalist(s)	Anne Dunham	on LJT LUCAS NORMARK	Great Britain	74.13	72.174	72.609	77.174	75.652	74.348
3rd place, bronze medalist(s)	Sérgio Fróes Oliva	on COCO CHANEL	Brazil	73.043	73.913	73.478	75	73.696	73.826
4	Elke Philipp	on REGALIZ	Germany	73.696	73.478	70	75.87	75.435	73.696
5	Laurentia Tan	on FUERST SHERLOCK	Singapore	73.696	72.174	72.174	76.087	73.478	73.522
6	Rihards Snikus	on KING OF THE DANCE	Latvia	73.478	74.783	73.261	71.304	73.043	73.174
7	Katja Karjalainen	on HIGH FLOW	Finland	70.87	70.87	71.522	71.087	70.87	71.043
8	Anita Johnsson	on DEAR FRIEND	Sweden	72.826	67.391	71.304	71.739	71.087	70.87
9	Jens lasse Dokkan	on CYPRES	Norway	71.087	69.783	69.13	72.609	67.826	70.087
10	Roxanne Trunnell	on ROYAL DANCER	United States	69.348	70	67.826	69.348	71.304	69.565
11	Thibault Stoclin	on UNIEK	France	68.696	70.435	66.087	68.913	70.435	68.913
12	Helen Kearney	on ROCK AND ROLL 2	Ireland	69.348	68.043	68.261	69.348	69.348	68.87
13	Birgitte Reitan	on STEFFI GRAF	Norway	70.217	67.391	63.913	70	69.13	68.13
14	Michael Martin Knauder	on CONTESSA 15	Austria	68.261	68.261	67.826	70.217	65.87	68.087
15	Luigi Ferdinando Acerbi	on QUASIMODO DISANPATRIGNANO	Italy	70.435	66.304	66.304	68.261	67.826	67.826
16	Anastasja Vistalova	on LATA BRANDIS	Czech Republic	66.957	68.261	67.826	68.261	66.957	67.652
17	Eveline Van Looveren	on EXELENT	Belgium	65.87	68.261	68.696	64.565	70.435	67.565
18	Vera lucia Mazzilli	on BALLANTINE	Brazil	67.826	68.478	64.783	68.478	66.087	67.13
19	Julia Sciancalepore	on POMMERY 4	Austria	64.13	65.87	67.391	68.478	65.652	66.304
20	Margaret Mcintosh	on RIO RIO	United States	65.652	66.304	66.087	68.478	64.565	66.217
21	Ana Veiga	on CONVICTO	Portugal	63.913	70.217	65.435	61.522	67.391	65.696
22	Robyn Andrews	on FANCIANNA	Canada	62.391	65.435	62.174	66.087	65.217	64.261
23	Natasha Tse Pui Ting	on NEW WASHINGTONS EDITION	Hong Kong	63.261	62.609	62.174	62.609	65.652	63.261
24	Gemma Rose Foo	on CASSIS ROYAL	Singapore	61.957	62.609	61.522	60	63.913	62
25	Katarina Jobbagyova	on STERNGREIFER	Slovakia	62.609	61.957	59.565	63.261	58.913	61.261
26	Sara Morganti	on ROYAL DELIGHT	Italy	0	0	0	0	0	WD
Ground Jury:									
E	Kjell Myhre		Norway						
C	Marc Urban, President.		Belgium						
B	Hanneke Gerritsen		Netherlands						
H	Anne Prain		France						
M	Sarah Leitch		United Kingdom						

- WD : withdrawn
