= Norway at the 1996 Summer Paralympics =

- IPC code: NOR
- NPC: Norwegian Olympic and Paralympic Committee and Confederation of Sports
- Website: www.idrett.no (in Norwegian)

in Atlanta
- Competitors: 42 (35 men and 7 women)
- Medals Ranked 17th: Gold 9 Silver 7 Bronze 4 Total 20

Summer Paralympics appearances (overview)
- 1960; 1964; 1968; 1972; 1976; 1980; 1984; 1988; 1992; 1996; 2000; 2004; 2008; 2012; 2016; 2020; 2024

42 athletes (35 men and 7 women) from Norway competed at the 1996 Summer Paralympics in Atlanta, United States.

== Medallists ==
Medal	Name	Sport	Event
Gold	Anne Cecilie Ore	Equestrian	Mixed dressage grade III
Gold	Anne Cecilie Ore	Equestrian	Mixed kur canter grade III
Gold	Helge Bjoernstad	Swimming	Men's 100m backstroke S9
Gold	Noel Pedersen	Swimming	Men's 100m breaststroke B3
Gold	Rune Ulvang	Swimming	100m breaststroke SB8
Gold	Noel Pedersen	Swimming	Men's 200m breaststroke B3
Gold	Helge Bjoernstad	Swimming	Men's 200m medley SM9
Gold	Eva Nesheim	Swimming	Women's 50m butterfly S7
Gold	Eva Nesheim	Swimming	Women's 200m medley SM6
Silver	Noel Pedersen	Swimming	Men's 50m freestyle B3
Silver	Noel Pedersen	Swimming	Men's 100m backstroke B3
Silver	Helge Bjoernstad	Swimming	Men's 100m breaststroke SB8
Silver	Noel Pedersen	Swimming	Men's 200m medley B3
Silver	Eva Nesheim	Swimming	Women's 100m backstroke S7
Silver	Eva Nesheim	Swimming	Women's 100m breaststroke SB5
Silver	Lars Jensen; Oeivind Olsen; Andreas Vennesland; Erik Halvorsen; Kaare Lyse; Tomas Nesheim; Ole Hodnemyr; Oeyvind Strand; Gaute Rostrup; Bjarne Abrahamsen	Volleyball	Men's sitting volleyball team
Bronze	Aage Joensberg	Cycling	Mixed 65/75k bicycle LC1
Bronze	Aage Joensberg	Cycling	Mixed omnium LC1
Bronze	Frank Gyland	Powerlifting	Men's 90kg
Bronze	Stig Morten Sandvik	Swimming	Men's 150m medley SM3

== See also ==
- Norway at the Paralympics
- Norway at the 1996 Summer Olympics
