= Norway at the 2008 Summer Paralympics =

- IPC code: NOR
- NPC: Norwegian Olympic and Paralympic Committee and Confederation of Sports
- Website: www.idrett.no (in Norwegian)

in Beijing
- Competitors: 24 in 9 sports
- Medals Ranked 43rd: Gold 1 Silver 3 Bronze 3 Total 7

Summer Paralympics appearances (overview)
- 1960; 1964; 1968; 1972; 1976; 1980; 1984; 1988; 1992; 1996; 2000; 2004; 2008; 2012; 2016; 2020; 2024

Norway sent a delegation of 24 competitors, (14 men and 10 women,) to compete at the 2008 Summer Paralympics in Beijing, from September 6 to September 17, 2008.

Norwegian competitors took part in nine different sports: archery, athletics, boccia, cycling, equestrian, sailing, shooting, swimming and table tennis.

== Medalists ==
Medal	Name	Sport	Event
Gold	Cecilie Drabsch Norland	Swimming	individual
Silver	Ann Cathrin Lübbe	Equestrian	individual
Silver	Ann Cathrin Lübbe	Equestrian	individual
Silver	Jens Lasse Dokkan	Equestrian	individual
Bronze	Jens Lasse Dokkan, Mariette Garborg, Ann Cathrin Lubbe, Sigrid Rui	Equestrian	team
Bronze	Tommy Urhaug	Table tennis	individual
Bronze	Mariann Vestbøstad	Swimming	individual

== Archery ==
1 competitor:

Men

Athlete	Event	Ranking round		Round of 32	Round of 16	Quarterfinals	Semifinals	Finals	
Athlete	Event	Score	Rank	Opposition Result	Opposition Result	Opposition Result	Opposition Result	Opposition Result	Rank
Tom Vangen	Ind. compound open	654	19	Pemberton (USA); L 103:106	did not advance				

== Athletics ==
2 competitors:

Men

Athlete	Event	Heat		Semifinal		Final	
Athlete	Event	Result	Rank	Result	Rank	Result	Rank
Runar Steinstad	Javelin throw F42/44	N/A				44.55	10

Women

Athlete	Event	Heat		Semifinal		Final	
Athlete	Event	Result	Rank	Result	Rank	Result	Rank
Elin Holen	Long jump F42	N/A				3.38	7

== Boccia ==
Paralympic Boccia is open to players with cerebral palsy and other major physical disabilities. There were no separate events for men and women.

3 competitors:

Individual

Athlete	Event	Match 1	Match 2	Match 3	Match 4	Quarterfinals	Semifinals	Final	
Athlete	Event	Opposition Result	Opposition Result	Opposition Result	Opposition Result	Opposition Result	Opposition Result	Opposition Result	Rank
John Nørsterud	Mixed individual - BC2	Wong (HKG); W 6–1	Goncalves (POR); L 2–5	Martin (ESP); L 0–10	N/A	did not advance			
Elisabeth Wilhelmsen	Mixed individual - BC2	Kwok (HKG); L 0–15	Toon (NZL); L 0–21	Morriss (NZL); L 1–10	N/A	did not advance			
Roger Aandalen	Mixed individual - BC1	Marques (POR); L 3–11	Sanders (NZL); W 5–2	Smith (GBR); L 1–6	Moran (IRL); L 2–4	did not advance			

Team

Athlete	Event	Match 1	Match 2	Match 3	Match 4	Quarterfinals	Semifinals	Final	
Athlete	Event	Opposition Result	Opposition Result	Opposition Result	Opposition Result	Opposition Result	Opposition Result	Opposition Result	Rank
John Nørsterud, Elisabeth Wilhelmsen, Roger Aandalen	Mixed team - BC1-2	Japan (JPN); W 7–4	Portugal (POR); L 1–19	Great Britain (GBR); L 1–11	N/A	did not advance			

== Cycling ==
1 competitor:

=== Track ===
Men

Pursuits

Athlete	Event	Qualifying		Final/ Bronze medal race	
Athlete	Event	Time Speed (km/h)	Rank	Opposition Time Speed (km/h)	Rank
Morten Jahr	Men's individual pursuit - LC2	5:23.921; 44.455	8	did not advance	

Time Trials

Athlete	Event	Time	Rank
Morten Jahr	Men's 1 km time trial - LC2	1:17.050	10

=== Road ===
Men

Athlete	Event	Time	Rank
Morten Jahr	Men's Individual Time Trial - LC2	37:53.80 (+4.17.10)	7
Morten Jahr	Men's Individual Road Race - LC1/LC2/CP4	1:50:15 (+4:12)	18

== Equestrian ==
Equestrian in the Paralympic Games is Dressage only. Anne Cecilie Ore was replaced by Silje Gillund, as Ore's horse received an injury before the Paralympic Games. There were no separate events for men and women. 5 competitors:

Individual

Athlete	Horse	Event	Points	Result
Ann Cathrin Lübbe	Zanko	Individual championship test - grade IV	68,516	Silver medal
Ann Cathrin Lübbe	Zanko	Individual freestyle test - grade IV	75.046	Silver medal
Sigrid Rui	Nanof	Individual championship test - grade IV	60,064	10
Sigrid Rui	Nanof	Individual freestyle test - grade IV	69.498	4
Mariette Garborg	Luthar	Individual championship test - grade II	64.182	10
Mariette Garborg	Luthar	Individual freestyle test - grade II	63.554	12
Silje Gillund	Dundee Klint	Individual championship test - grade III	58.720	9
Silje Gillund	Dundee Klint	Individual freestyle test - grade III	61.056	11
Jens Lasse Dokkan	Lacour	Individual championship test - grade Ib	68.857	Silver medal
Jens Lasse Dokkan	Lacour	Individual freestyle test - grade Ib	65.555	5

Team

Athletes	Horses	Event	Team Test			Championship Test			Total	Rank
Athletes	Horses	Event	Result	Team Total	Rank	Result	Team Total	Rank	Total	Rank
Jens Lasse Dokkan, Mariette Garborg, Ann Cathrin Lubbe, Sigrid Rui	Lacour, Luthar; Zanko; Nanof	Team	69.765; 65.238; 67.785; 63.357#	202.788	3	68.857; 64.182; 68.516; 60.064#	201.555	3	404.343	Bronze medal

'#' denotes scores that did not count toward the team total.

== Sailing ==
4 competitors:

Athlete	Event	Race											Score	Rank
Athlete	Event	1	2	3	4	5	6	7	8	9	10	11	Score	Rank
Bjørnar Erikstad	1Person Keelboat - 2.4mR	6	8	~~16~~	~~13~~	8	2	9	6	13	12	CAN	64	8
Per Eugen Kristiansen, Jostein Stordahl, Aleksander Wang-Hansen	3-Person Keelboat (Sonar)	6	2	5	8	1	~~15~~; OCS	~~9~~	1	5	3	6	37	4

- CAN - Race cancelled
- OCS - On the course side

== Shooting ==
1 competitor:

Women

Athlete	Event	Qualification		Final		Rank
Athlete	Event	Score	Rank	Score	Total	Rank
Monica Lillehagen	R2-10m air rifle standing - SH1	389	3 Q	99.3	488,3	5

== Swimming ==
5 competitors:

Athlete	Events	Heat		Final	
Athlete	Events	Time	Rank	Time	Rank
Stian Helgeland	Men's 50 m butterfly - S6	37.41	6	did not advance	
Stian Helgeland	Men's 50 m freestyle - S6	35.07	6	did not advance	
Stian Helgeland	Men's 100 m freestyle - S6	1:15.68	6	did not advance	
Stian Helgeland	Men's 400 m freestyle - S6	5:32.26	4 Q	5:32.24	8
Cecilie Drabsch Norland	Women's 50 m freestyle - S8	32.11	1 Q	32.09	Gold medal
Cecilie Drabsch Norland	Women's 100 m freestyle - S8	1:11.68	3 Q	1:11.88	5
Marianne Mæland	Women's 100 m breaststroke - SB6	2:10.55	6	did not advance	
Jørgen Tadvin	Men's 400 m freestyle - S6	6:03.36	5	did not advance	
Mariann Vestbøstad	Women's 100 m backstroke - S8	1:21.77	1 Q	1:20.86	Bronze medal
Mariann Vestbøstad	Women's 100 m freestyle - S8	1:14.62	3	did not advance	
Mariann Vestbøstad	Women's 400 m freestyle - S8	5:38.47	4 Q	5:39.73	7

Key

- Q = Qualifiers for the final as decided on a time only basis. Ranks shown are overall rank against competitors in all heats

== Table tennis ==
2 competitors:

Men

Individual

Athlete	Event	Group Match 1	Group Match 2	Group Match 3	1/8 Finals	Quarterfinals	Semifinals	Final/ Bronze medal match	
Athlete	Event	Opposition Result	Opposition Result	Opposition Result	Opposition Result	Opposition Result	Opposition Result	Opposition Result	Rank
Rolf Erik Paulsen	Individual; Class 4/5	Meszaros (SVK); W 3-0	Cetin (GER); W 3-2	N/A	Jung (KOR); L 1-3	did not advance			
Tommy Urhaug	Individual; Class 4/5	Durasinovic (SRB); W 3-0	Starl (AUT); W 3-0	N/A		Zhang (CHN); W 3-2	Durand (FRA); L 2-3	Saleh (EGY); W 3-0	Bronze medal

Team

Athlete	Event	Group Match 1	Group Match 2	Group Match 3	1/8 Finals	Quarterfinals	Semifinals	Final/ Bronze medal match	
Athlete	Event	Opposition Result	Opposition Result	Opposition Result	Opposition Result	Opposition Result	Opposition Result	Opposition Result	Rank
Rolf Erik Paulsen, Tommy Urhaug	Team Class 4/5	N/A				Serbia (SRB); W 3-0	China (CHN); L 1-3	France (FRA); L 0-3	4

== See also ==
- 2008 Summer Paralympics
- Norway at the Paralympics
- Norway at the 2008 Summer Olympics
