= Equestrian events at the 2000 Summer Paralympics =

Equestrian at the XI Paralympic Games
- Paralympic Equestrian
- Venue: Sydney International Equestrian Centre
- Competitors: 72 from 24 nations

Paralympic symbol (1994-2004)

Equestrian events at the 2000 Summer Paralympics consisted of mixed individual and team dressage events.

== Medal table ==
Rank	Nation	Gold	Silver	Bronze	Total
1	Great Britain (GBR)	5	0	2	7
2	Australia (AUS)	2	0	2	4
3	Netherlands (NED)	1	2	1	4
4	New Zealand (NZL)	1	1	0	2
5	Norway (NOR)	0	3	4	7
6	Denmark (DEN)	0	2	0	2
7	Belgium (BEL)	0	1	0	1
8	Finland (FIN)	0	0	1	1
Totals (8 entries)		9	9	10	28

=== Participating nations ===
- Australia (7)
- Austria (2)
- Belgium (3)
- Bermuda (2)
- Croatia (1)
- Denmark (4)
- Finland (2)
- France (5)
- Germany (6)
- Great Britain (7)
- Ireland (2)
- Israel (1)
- Italy (1)
- Japan (3)
- Netherlands (4)
- New Zealand (1)
- Norway (5)
- Peru (1)
- Russia (1)
- South Africa (1)
- Spain (1)
- Sweden (5)
- United States (6)
- Zimbabwe (1)

== Medalists ==
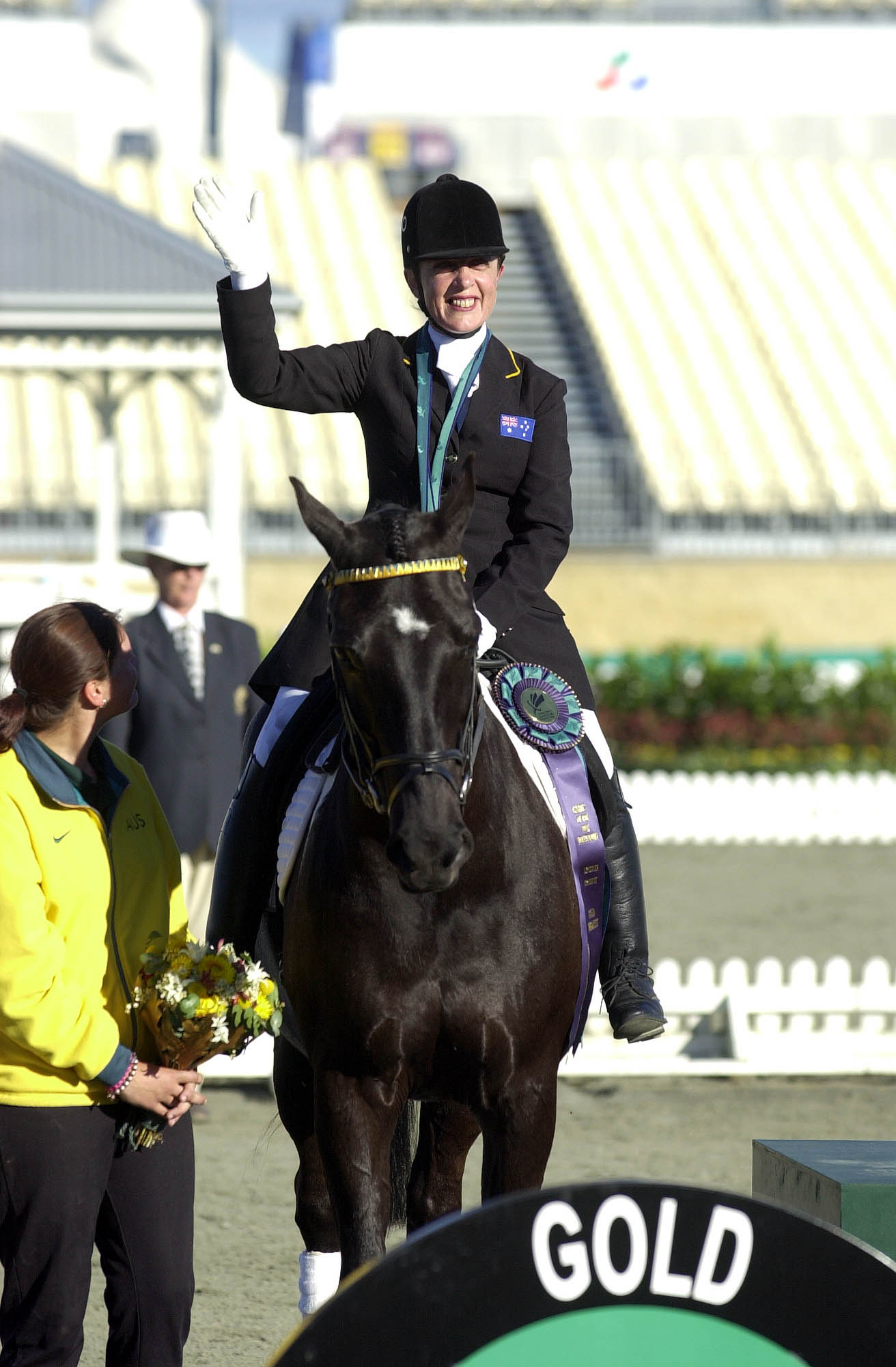
Higgins waves to the crowd from the gold medal podium. She won gold in the 2000 Summer Paralympics Individual Dressage Grade 3.

Event	Gold	Silver	Bronze
Mixed dressage Championship grade I	Lee Pearson; Great Britain	Brita Andersen; Denmark	Rosalie Fahey; Australia
Mixed dressage Championship grade I	Lee Pearson; Great Britain	Brita Andersen; Denmark	Jens Lasse Dokkan; Norway
Mixed dressage Championship grade II	Joop Stokkel; Netherlands	Francis de Baerdemaeker; Belgium	Nicola Tustain; Great Britain
Mixed dressage Championship grade III	Julie Higgins; Australia	Anne Cecilie Ore; Norway	Hanne Nesheim; Norway
Mixed dressage Championship grade IV	Jayne Craike; New Zealand	Ann Cathrin Evenrud; Norway	Kay Gebbie; Great Britain
Mixed dressage Freestyle grade I	Lee Pearson; Great Britain	Brita Andersen; Denmark	Jens Lasse Dokkan; Norway
Mixed dressage Freestyle grade II	Nicola Tustain; Great Britain	Joop Stokkel; Netherlands	Gert Bolmer; Netherlands
Mixed dressage Freestyle grade III	Julie Higgins; Australia	Anne Cecilie Ore; Norway	Marita Hird; Australia
Mixed dressage Freestyle grade IV	Kay Gebbie; Great Britain	Jayne Craike; New Zealand	Marita Tevali; Finland
Mixed dressage team open	Great Britain (GBR); Lee Pearson; Anne Dunham; Nicola Tustain; Kay Gebbie	Netherlands (NED); Sjerstin Vermeulen; Ineke de Groot; Joop Stokkel; Gert Bolmer	Norway (NOR); Silje Gillund; Anne Cecilie Ore; Jens Lasse Dokkan; Ann Cathrin Evenrud
