= Norway at the 2020 Summer Paralympics =

- Flag of Norway
- IPC code: NOR
- NPC: Norwegian Olympic and Paralympic Committee and Confederation of Sports
- Website: www.idrett.no (in Norwegian)

in Tokyo, Japan August 25, 2020 – September 6, 2020
- Competitors: 15 in 7 sports
- Medals: Gold 2 Silver 0 Bronze 2 Total 4

Summer Paralympics appearances (overview)
- 1960; 1964; 1968; 1972; 1976; 1980; 1984; 1988; 1992; 1996; 2000; 2004; 2008; 2012; 2016; 2020; 2024

Norway competed at the 2020 Summer Paralympics in Tokyo, Japan, from 25 August to 6 September 2020.

== Medalists ==
Medal	Name	Sport	Event	Date
Gold	Birgit Skarstein	Rowing	Women's single sculls	29 August
Gold	Salum Ageze Kashafali	Athletics	Men's 100 metres T12	29 August
Bronze	Aida Dahlen	Table tennis	Women's individual class 8	28 August
Bronze	Ann Cathrin Lubbe	Equestrian	Individual freestyle test grade III	30 August

== Competitors ==
Sport	Men	Women	Total
Athletics	1	1	2
Badminton	0	1	1
Equestrian	0	1	1
Rowing	0	1	1
Shooting	1	3	4
Swimming	2	1	3
Table tennis	1	2	3
Total	5	10	15

== Athletics ==
Salum Ageze Kashafali qualified to represent Norway after winning the gold medal in the men's 100 metres T12 event at the 2019 World Para Athletics Championships held in Dubai, United Arab Emirates.

== Badminton ==
Athlete	Event	Group Stage				Semifinal	Final / BM	
Athlete	Event	Opposition Score	Opposition Score	Opposition Score	Rank	Opposition Score	Opposition Score	Rank
Helle Sofie Sagøy	Women's singles SL4	Dransfield (AUS); W (21–17, 21–13)	Meier (CAN); W (21–6, 21–8)	Srinavakul (THA); W (21–14, 21–8)	1 Q	Cheng (CHN); L (15–21, 10–21)	Ma (CHN); L (12–21, 5–21)	4

== Equestrian ==
Norway sent one athlete after qualified.

== Rowing ==
Norway qualified one boat in the women's single sculls for the games by winning the gold medal at the 2019 World Rowing Championships in Ottensheim, Austria and securing one of seventh available place.

Athlete	Event	Heats		Repechage		Final	
Athlete	Event	Time	Rank	Time	Rank	Time	Rank
Birgit Skarstein	Women's single sculls	14:27.48	1 FA	N/A		10:56.88	1st place, gold medalist(s)

Qualification Legend: FA=Final A (medal); FB=Final B (non-medal); R=Repechage

== Shooting ==
Norway entered four athletes into the Paralympic competition. All of them successfully break the Paralympic qualification at the 2019 WSPS World Championships which was held in Sydney, Australia.

Athlete	Event	Qualification		Final	
Athlete	Event	Score	Rank	Score	Rank
Sonja Jennie Tobiassen	Mixed R4 – 10 m air rifle standing SH2				
Paul Aksel Johansen	Mixed R6 – 50 m rifle prone SH1				
Monica Lillehagen	Women's R8 – 50 m rifle three position				
Heidi Kristin Soerlie-Rogne	Mixed R9 – 50 m rifle prone SH2				

== Swimming ==
Sarah Louise Rung and Andreas Skaar Bjornstad qualified to represent Norway at the 2020 Summer Paralympics. But Norway qualified one more to represent.

== Table tennis ==
Norway entered three players into the table tennis competition at the games. Tommy Urhaug and Aida Dahlen qualified via World Ranking allocation and Nora Korneliussen who won a gold medal at the World Qualification Tournament.

Men

Athlete	Event	Group Stage			Round 1	Quarterfinals	Semifinals	Final	
Athlete	Event	Opposition Result	Opposition Result	Rank	Opposition Result	Opposition Result	Opposition Result	Opposition Result	Rank
Tommy Urhaug	Men's individual C5	Depergola (ARG); W 3–0	Palikuća (SRB); L 0–3	2 Q	Hunter-Spivey (GBR); L 2–3	Did not advance			
Nora Korneliussen	Women's individual C7	Korkut (TUR); L 0–3	Safonova (RPC); L 0–3	3	Did not advance				
Aida Dahlen	Women's individual C8	Lacerda (BRA); W 3–0	Wenjuan (CHN); L 2–3	2 Q	N/A	Arlóy (HUN); W 3–1	Jingdian (CHN); L 0–3	did not advance	3rd place, bronze medalist(s)

== See also ==
- Norway at the Paralympics
- Norway at the 2020 Summer Olympics
