= Julie Higgins =

Australian equestrian

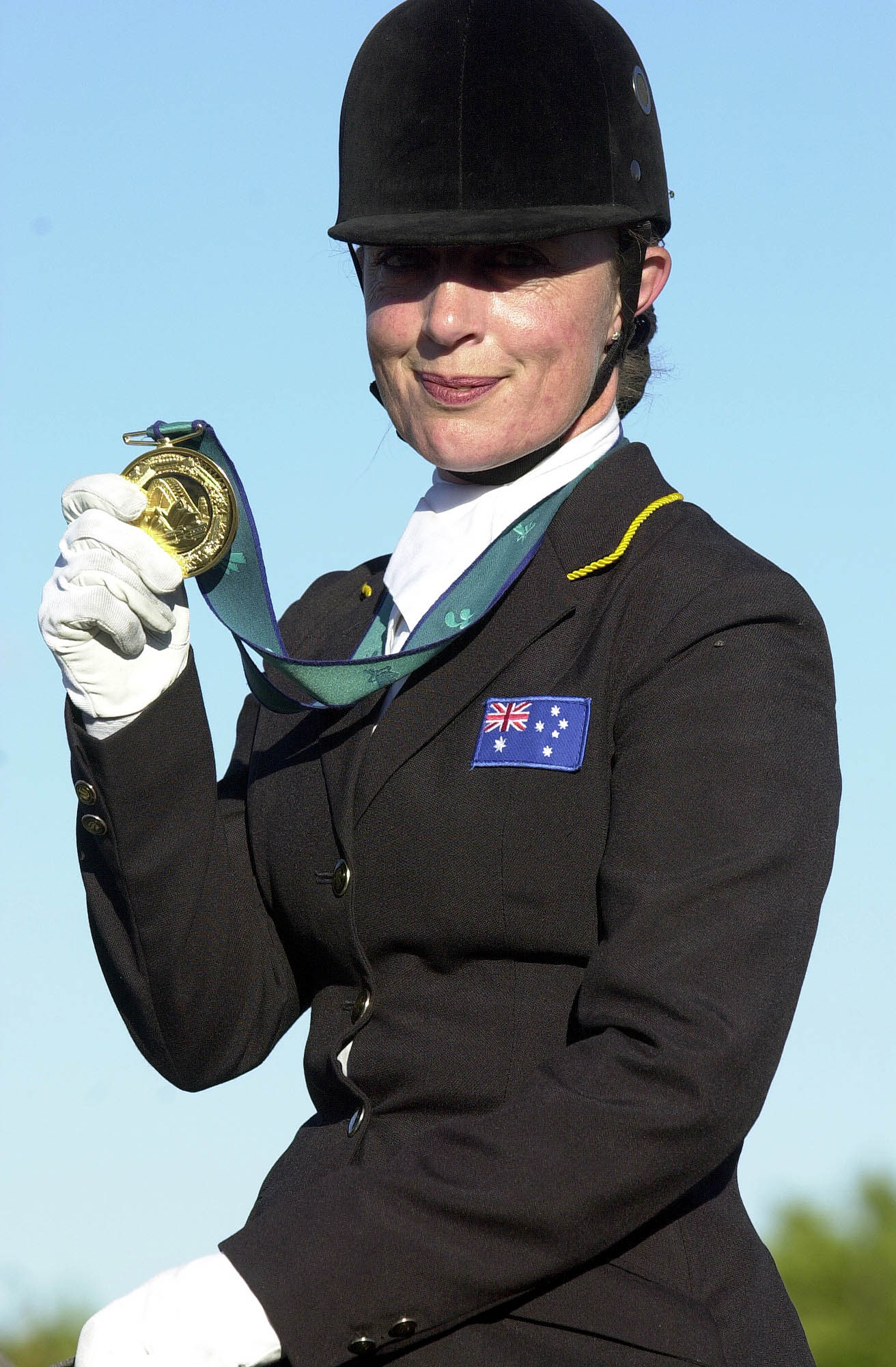
- Higgins shown with her gold medal won at the 2000 Summer Paralympics for Individual Dressage Grade III

Personal information
- Full name: Julie Elizabeth Higgins
- Nationality: Australia
- Born: 28 February 1958 (age 68)
Medal record
Para equestrian
Representing Australia
Paralympic Games
Gold medal – first place	2000 Sydney	Mixed Dressage; Championship grade III
Gold medal – first place	2000 Sydney	Mixed Dressage; Freestyle grade III

Julie Elizabeth Higgins, OAM (née Fowler, born 28 February 1958) is an Australian equestrian rider who won two gold medals at the 2000 Summer Paralympics in Sydney.

== Personal ==
Higgins was born in Sydney on 28 February 1958. She was born with Fanconi syndrome, which robs the bones of calcium and causes malabsorption of phosphate, vitamins, and sugar. Doctors did not expect her to live beyond the age of ten. She never crawled, and when she began to walk at the age of nearly three, she experienced severe bowing in both legs.

She took up horseriding at the age of eight, because it was the only sport at which she could compete; as a result, her soft bones re-moulded themselves around the shape of a horse. She later said that "The horse became my legs and I could ride better than I could ever walk." At the age of 22, she found that she could no longer ride because she had worn out her hip joints, and underwent her first hip replacement when she was 25. During her sixteen-year hiatus from the sport, she taught her husband, Phillip, how to ride, and was his coach and groom when he competed in eventing and show jumping. As of 2012, she works as an associate to Justice Peter Hidden of the Supreme Court of New South Wales.

== Career ==
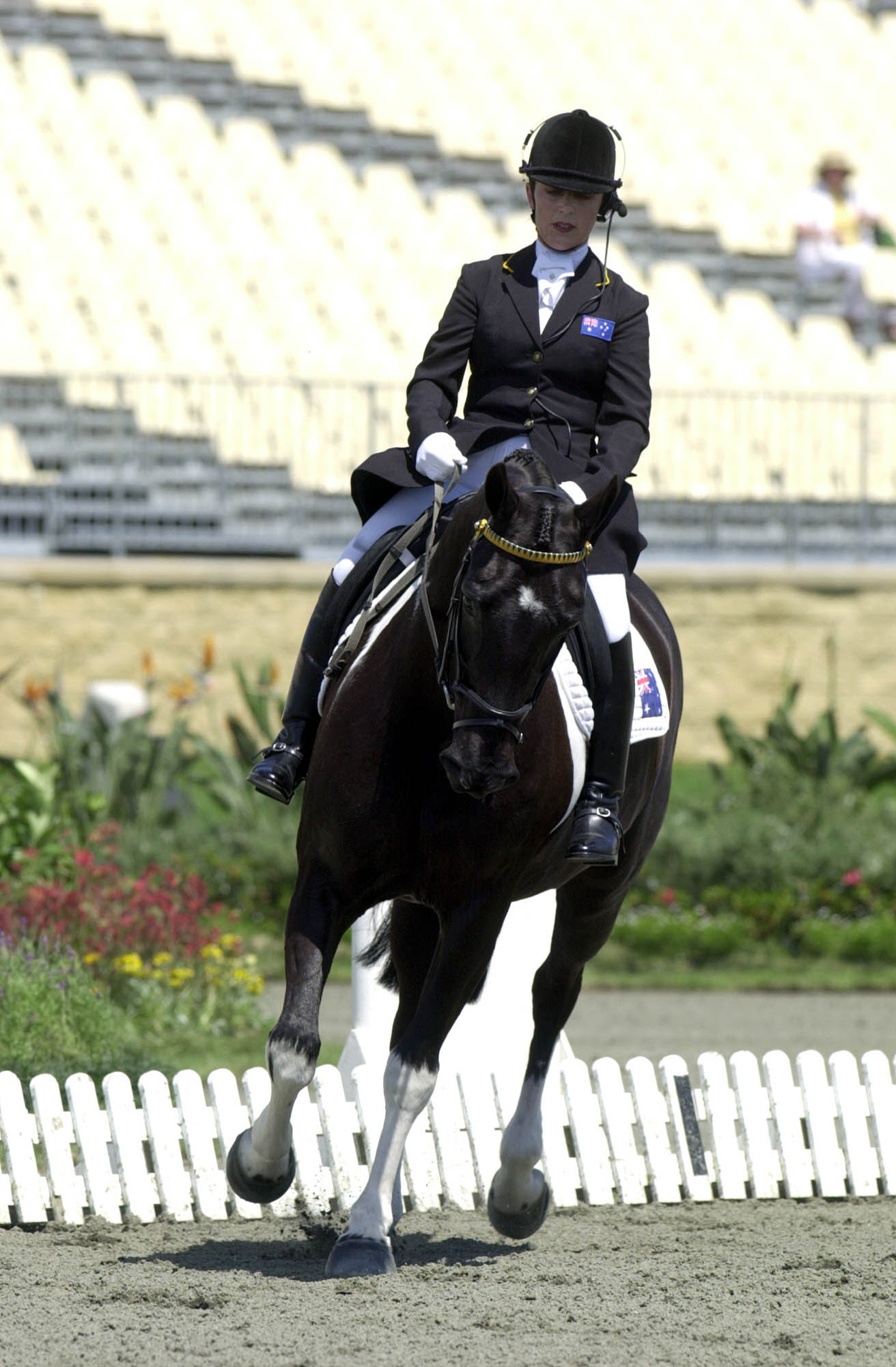
Action shot of Higgins during the 2000 Summer Paralympics Individual Dressage Grade III event in which she won gold

Inspired by television footage of the inaugural equestrian event at the 1996 Atlanta Paralympics, Higgins took horseriding up again, with the aim of competing at the 2000 Paralympics in Sydney. Her family and friends were concerned about the impact that the sport would have on her deteriorating hip joints, and she made a pact with her husband that she would give up the sport if she did not do well at the next British national Championships for Riders with Disabilities, which were to be held six months later. She won the British championships at both the national and international level in the Grade 3 classification from 1997 to 1999. After her first British championships win, her husband put aside his riding career to be her coach and motivator. In August 1999, she won two bronze medals at the 4th World Dressage Championships for Riders with Disabilities in Denmark, one in the individual grade 3 championship and the other as part of the Australian dressage team.

Three months before the 2000 Sydney Paralympics, Higgins' hip began to fail and she could no longer ride with stirrups; she had a saddle especially made for her for the competition. She had postponed a hip replacement to compete in the games. Although she was in serious pain, she could not take painkillers during the games in case they led to her being tested positive for drugs. She was randomly selected to work with a 14-year-old pinto gelding named Kaleidoscope for the games, formerly known as Magpie, who she admired "more than any other horse". She had previously seen him at showjumping events and had competed against the horse at state and national championships, as he had been working with riders with disabilities since 1998. He had hoof trouble two days after Higgins first met him; however, his hoof was fixed in time for the competition. Higgins won two gold medals in the Mixed Dressage – Championship grade III and Mixed Dressage – Freestyle grade III events, for which she received a Medal of the Order of Australia, and was part of the team that came fifth in the Mixed Dressage Team open event. She was Australia's first equestrian Paralympic gold medallist. She had her sixth hip replacement in February 2001 and returned to riding, once again winning the New South Wales State Championship Dressage title for Riders With Disabilities and the perpetual trophy for the highest point score.

== Recognition ==
Higgins was named the Australian Paralympic Committee's female paralympic athlete of the year in 2000. That year, she received an Australian Sports Medal, and in 2001, she received a Centenary Medal. She also received an Award of Excellence for International Competition from the Equestrian Federation of Australia, a Sir Roden Cutler Award, and the 2002 Australia Day Sportsperson of the Year award from the City of Hawkesbury. She was also named Horse Magazine's Rider of the Year. She has served as an Australia Day Ambassador for various local government areas of New South Wales.
