= Gert Bolmer =

Dutch Paralympic equestrian

Personal information
- Born: April 25, 1983 (age 43) Almelo, Netherlands
Medal record
Para equestrian
Representing Netherlands
Paralympic Games
Silver medal – second place	2000 Sydney	Mixed Dressage; Team Open
Bronze medal – third place	2000 Sydney	Mixed Dressage; Freestyle Grade II
Bronze medal – third place	2004 Athens	Mixed Dressage; Championship Grade II
Bronze medal – third place	2004 Athens	Mixed Dressage; Team Open

Gert Bolmer (born April 25, 1983, in Almelo, Netherlands) is a professional horse rider competing in dressage. He is grade II disabled.

== Career ==
Apart from numerous participations in national as well as international contests, he is best known for his participation in the Equestrian events of recent Paralympic Games:

- 2000 Summer Paralympics in Sydney, Australia
- 2004 Summer Paralympics in Athens, Greece.

In the 2000 Summer Paralympics he earned a silver medal for the team test and a bronze medal for the freestyle to music. In the 2004 Summer Paralympics he won two bronze medals for both team and individual dressage.

He also participated in the 1999 world championship where he finished third in the team test, individual dressage and freestyle to music. In the following 2003 world championship he also finished third in the same categories except the team test where he finished fifth. The European championship of 2003 again yielded him two third places in the same categories as well as a fourth place for the team test.
