= Equestrian events at the 1996 Summer Paralympics =

Equestrian at the X Paralympic Games
- Paralympic Equestrian
- Competitors: 61 from 16 nations

Paralympic symbol (1994-2004)

Equestrian events at the 1996 Summer Paralympics consisted of nine events. All events were mixed, meaning that men and women competed together.

== Medal table ==
Rank	Nation	Gold	Silver	Bronze	Total
1	Great Britain (GBR)	3	3	2	8
2	United States (USA)	2	0	1	3
3	Norway (NOR)	2	0	0	2
4	Denmark (DEN)	1	3	2	6
5	Germany (GER)	1	2	0	3
6	France (FRA)	0	1	1	2
7	Ireland (IRL)	0	0	1	1
7	Netherlands (NED)	0	0	1	1
7	Sweden (SWE)	0	0	1	1
Totals (9 entries)		9	9	9	27

=== Participating nations ===
- Australia (5)
- Bermuda (2)
- Canada (4)
- Denmark (5)
- Finland (2)
- France (5)
- Germany (6)
- Great Britain (6)
- Ireland (2)
- Israel (4)
- Italy (1)
- Netherlands (3)
- New Zealand (1)
- Norway (4)
- Sweden (5)
- United States (6)

== Medal summary ==
Event	Gold	Silver	Bronze
Dressage grade I	Brita Andersen; Denmark	Dianne Tubbs; Great Britain	Sarah Rydh; Sweden
Dressage grade II	Vicki Sweigart; United States	Angelika Trabert; Germany	Lauren McDevitt (now Howard); United States
Dressage grade III	Anne Cecilie Ore; Norway	Elizabeth Stone; Great Britain	Joop Stokkel; Netherlands
Dressage grade IV	Joanna Jackson; Great Britain	Patricia Straughan; Great Britain	Britta Sorensen; Denmark
Kur canter grade III	Anne Cecilie Ore; Norway	Frederic Aguillaume; France	Joan Salmon; Ireland
Kur canter grade IV	Joanna Jackson; Great Britain	Charlotte Jensen; Denmark	Britta Sorensen; Denmark
Kur trot grade I	Birgit Dreiszis; Germany	Brita Andersen; Denmark	Dianne Tubbs; Great Britain
Kur trot grade II	Vicki Sweigart; United States	Angelika Trabert; Germany	Anne Dunham; Great Britain
Team	Great Britain (GBR)	Denmark (DEN)	France (FRA)

== See also ==
- Equestrian events at the 1996 Summer Olympics
