= Aalsmeerderbrug =

- Hamlet
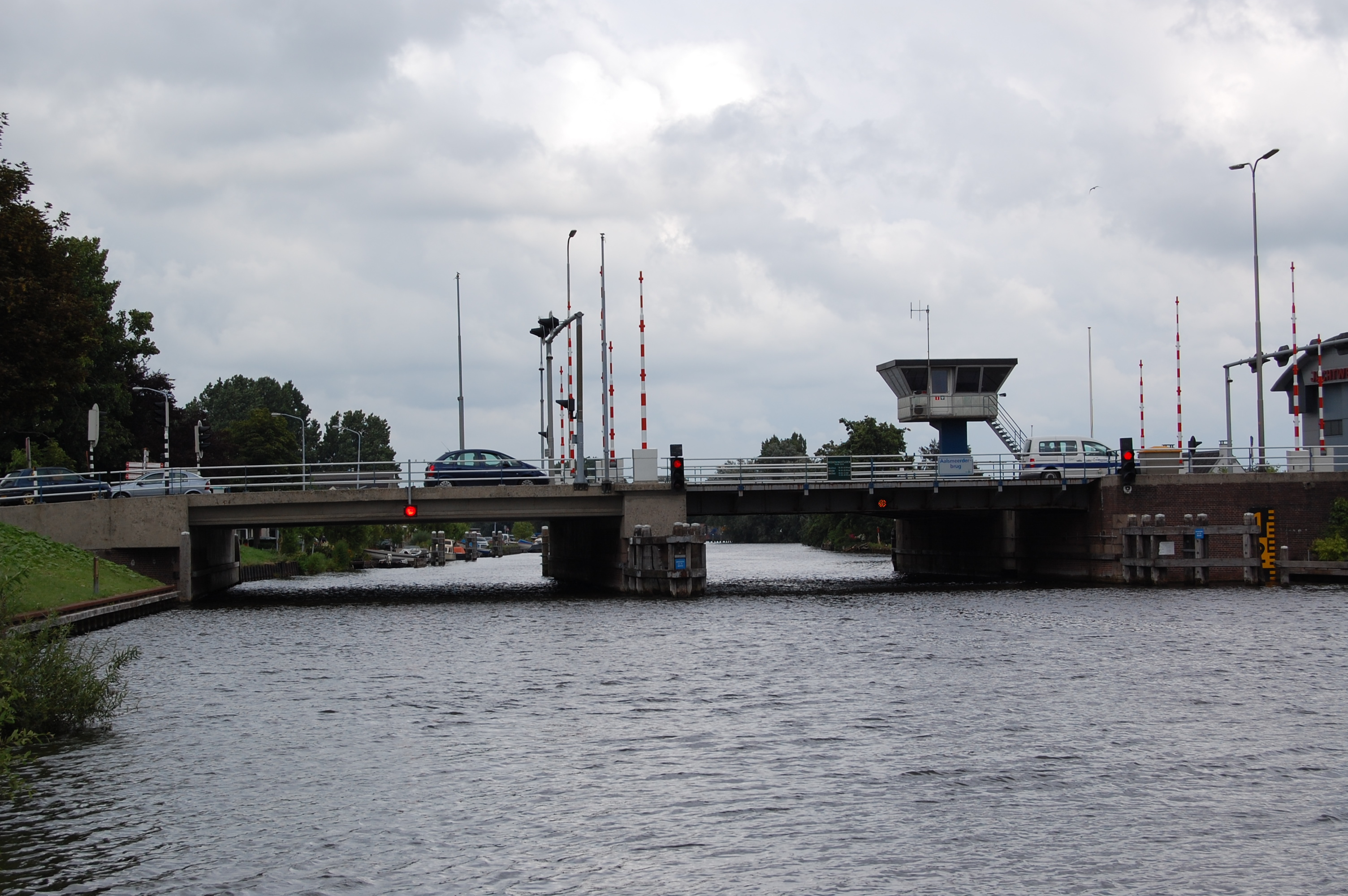

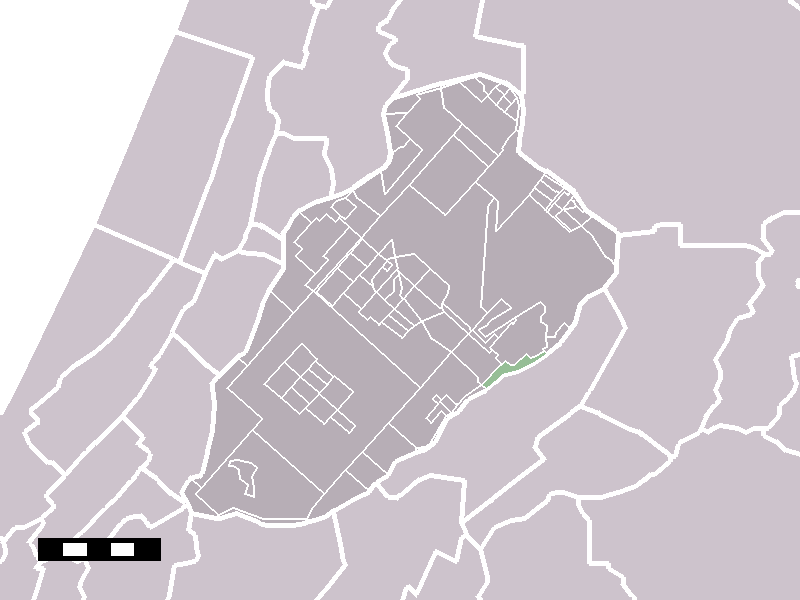
- Aalsmeerderbrug in the municipality of Haarlemmermee

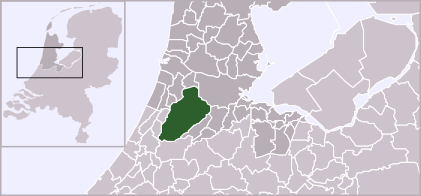

- Location within North Holland Location within Netherlands Location within Europe
- Coordinates: 52°16′N 4°45′E
- Country: Netherlands
- Province: North Holland
- Municipality: Haarlemmermeer

Population (2004)
  - Total: 500

Aalsmeerderbrug (Dutch pronunciation: [ˈaːlsmeːrdərˌbrʏx]) is a hamlet in the Dutch province of North Holland. It is a part of the municipality of Haarlemmermeer, and lies about 6 kilometres (3.7 mi) southeast of Hoofddorp.

Aalsmeerderbrug has a population of around 500.
