= Riding for the Disabled Association =

Disability organisation based in the United Kingdom

- "It's what you can do that counts."
- Formation: 1969
- Legal status: Charity
- Headquarters: Shrewley, Warwickshire
- President: Princess Anne
- CEO: Michael Bishop
- Affiliations: British Equestrian
- Website: rda.org.uk

The Riding for the Disabled Association (RDA) is a United Kingdom based charity founded in 1969 focused on providing therapeutic horse-riding, equestrian vaulting and carriage driving lessons to people with developmental and physical disabilities as well seeking to improve the lives of those with mental health difficulties. Princess Anne has been the organisation's President since 1985.

The RDA is a federation of about 500 independent groups and serves over 26,500 adults and children each year and is one of 16 members that make up British Equestrian.

Since 2013, the RDA in partnership with British Equestrian, accredits commercial riding schools with the Accessibility Mark.

== History ==
=== Beginnings of therapeutic riding ===
The first known mentions of the benefits of horse riding for disabled people are found in 600BC Greek literature. The first study ascribed with value on the merits of equine-assisted therapy is then found in 1895 by French physician Cassaign who concluded that equine therapy helped certain neurological disorders.

=== Founding of the RDA ===
In the 20th century, therapeutic horseback riding or equine-assisted therapy, became popular across Europe after Dane Lis Hartel, despite being paralyzed from the knees down by polio, won the silver medal for Individual Dressage at the 1952 Summer Olympics.

Her success inspired therapeutic horseback riding organisations to be created across Europe and by 1964, a loose organisation called the Advisory Council on Riding for the Disabled was formed to coordinate these groups.

By 1966, 23 of these were present in the United Kingdom and by 1969 were organised formally in to Riding for the Disabled Association with Lavinia Fitzalan-Howard, Duchess of Norfolk as its first president. In 1985 Princess Anne became RDA President, a position she still holds.

Billy Strachan, one of the pioneers of black civil rights in Britain, served as the secretary of the Harrow Branch.

In 2019, the RDA celebrated its 50th anniversary.

== Riding for the Disabled National Championships ==
Since 1985 regional qualifiers lead up to the Riding for the Disabled National Championships which are held every year at Hartpury University and Hartpury College, Gloucester. The events include ridden and non-ridden classes featuring dressage, carriage driving, the Countryside Challenge, showjumping, vaulting and showing.

== Milestones ==
Year	Milestone
1969	The RDA is formally created.
1971	Princess Anne becomes RDA patron.
1975	Carriage driving becomes an RDA activity.
1985	The first National RDA Dressage Championships take place.
1985	Princess Anne becomes RDA President.
1996	Para dressage is included in the olympics.
2010	Showjumping is included as an activity.
2013	Endurance is added as an activity.
2013	Creation of Accessibility Mark accreditation for commercial stables.
2014	RDA features on a collection of Royal Mail stamps called 'Working Horses'.
2019	The RDA celebrates its 50th anniversary.
2022	Human Equine Interaction Register (HEIR) is launched as part of wider group.

== Notable successes ==
At the London 2012, Rio 2016 and Tokyo 2020 Paralympic Games all of the Team GB Para riders started out with RDA. The team consisted of Natasha Baker MBE, Sophie Christiansen, Sir Lee Pearson and Sophie Wells MBE. For the Tokyo 2020 games Georgia Wilson joined the team in place of Sophie Christiansen.
