= Norway at the 1992 Summer Paralympics =

- IPC code: NOR
- NPC: Norwegian Olympic and Paralympic Committee and Confederation of Sports
- Website: www.idrett.no (in Norwegian)

in Barcelona
- Competitors: 38
- Medals Ranked 12th: Gold 13 Silver 13 Bronze 7 Total 33

Summer Paralympics appearances (overview)
- 1960; 1964; 1968; 1972; 1976; 1980; 1984; 1988; 1992; 1996; 2000; 2004; 2008; 2012; 2016; 2020; 2024

Norway competed at the 1992 Summer Paralympics in Barcelona, Spain. 38 competitors from Norway won 33 medals, including 13 gold, 13 silver and 7 bronze and finished 10th in the medal table.

== See also ==
- Norway at the Paralympics
- Norway at the 1992 Summer Olympics
