= Tom Nordtvedt =

Norwegian Paralympic swimmer

Tom Andreas Nordtvedt (born 15 July 1963) is a retired Paralympic swimmer from Norway. He was born and raised in Trondheim but is now living in Ørland Municipality. Nordtvedt has won medals at two Paralympics as well as other European and World championships events.

When he was nine years old he was injured and disabled in an accident with electric power. He lost his right hand and left foot below the knee. 80% of his body were burnt but today he enjoys a good health. He has five children and three grandchildren. Nordtvedt used to be right-handed, but when he lost his hand he had to learn how to write with his left hand.

Nordtvedt competed at the 1980 Summer Paralympics in Arnhem, Netherlands, winning silver in the 50 metre breaststroke event. At the 1984 Summer Paralympics he won silver in the 50 metre backstroke, as well as two bronze medals in the 50 metre breaststroke and 150 metre individual medley.
