= Jonathan Wentz =

American Paralympic equestrian

Personal information
- Full name: Jonathan Michael Wentz
- Nationality: American
- Born: November 15, 1990 Austin, Texas
- Died: September 30, 2012 (aged 21) Dallas, Texas
- Height: 6 ft 3 in (1.91 m) (2012)

Sport
- Country: United States
- Sport: Equestrian

Jonathan Michael Wentz (November 15, 1990 – September 30, 2012) was an American Paralympic equestrian competitor. He competed at the 2012 Summer Paralympics, where he finished fourth in the Grade 1b individual championship event.

== Personal ==
Wentz was born on November 15, 1990, in Austin, Texas to James and Christina Wentz. He had cerebral palsy since birth. He was 6 feet 3 inches (1.91 m) tall. When not competing in equestrian, he played soccer, football, golf and baseball.

In 2008, while he was in high school, he was featured on the television show The Real Winning Edge, where the episode focused on overcoming challenges to compete at the highest level. He had a partial scholarship to Southern Methodist University and was a senior in 2012.

Wentz died September 30, 2012, at age 21. A cause of death was not immediately established. News of his death was first shared by his parents on Facebook. At the time of his death, he was living in Highland Park, Texas.

== Equestrian ==
Wentz was an American Paralympic equestrian. He was coached by Kai Handt from 2009 to 2012. He started riding for therapy at age 2. In 2008 he began riding at the North Texas Equestrian Center and trained six days a week under Kai Handt.

Wentz competed at the 2010 World Equestrian Games, where he finished 11th in the freestyle event and 15th in the team test event. He competed at the 2011 USEF Para-Equestrian Dressage National Championships, where he finished first.

Wentz competed at the 2012 Summer Paralympics in September, where he finished fourth in the Grade 1b individual championship event. He was narrowly defeated by Austrian Pep Puch who finished with 4.695 points ahead of Wentz in earning a bronze medal. He also had a fifth-place finish in London in the individual freestyle event. He was the country's only male representative in the sport and his performance was the best of any American competitor in the sport at the Olympic and Paralympic Games. Friends and family made the trip from the United States to watch him compete.

Going into the Paralympics, Wentz was ranked tenth in the world. He earned his selection to the Paralympic Games at the Gladstone, New Jersey-hosted 2012 USEF Para-Equestrian Dressage National Championships where he rode his horse, Richter Scale, in the freestyle event and scored 72.899% for a first-place finish. He also rode a horse called Silvano and finished second in the event with a score of 72.101%.
