= Mona Ullmann =

Norwegian paralympic athlete

Personal information
- Born: 14 April 1967 (age 59) Tønsberg, Norway

Sport
- Country: Norway
- Sport: Paralympic athletics
- Disability class: B3
Medal record
Paralympic athletics
Representing Norway
Paralympic Games
Gold medal – first place	1984 Stoke Mandeville/New York	Pentathlon B3
Gold medal – first place	1988 Seoul	Javelin throw B2
Silver medal – second place	1984 Stoke Mandeville/New York	Javelin throw B3
Silver medal – second place	1988 Seoul	Pentathlon B2
Silver medal – second place	1988 Seoul	Shot put B2
Bronze medal – third place	1984 Stoke Mandeville/New York	Long jump B3
Bronze medal – third place	1984 Stoke Mandeville/New York	Shot put B3
Bronze medal – third place	1988 Seoul	Long jump B2
Bronze medal – third place	1992 Barcelona	Discus throw B2
Bronze medal – third place	1992 Barcelona	Javelin throw B1-3
Bronze medal – third place	1992 Barcelona	Shot put B2

Mona Ullmann (born 14 May 1967) is a Norwegian paralympic athlete. She competed in athletics, including javelin throw, shot put, discus throw, long jump and combined events.

She represented Tønsberg Athletics Club nationally and Norway internationally. She is the leader of the Vestfold county team of the Norwegian Association of the Blind and is involved in matters for the blind and partially sighted. In 1991, she was appointed Tønsberg Knight by Vestfold Market Forum.

== Career ==
Ullmann competed at the 1984 Paralympic Summer Games, winning a gold medal in Women's Pentathlon B3, silver medal in Women's Javelin B3, and bronze medal in Women's Long Jump B3, and Women's Shot Put B3.

At the 1988 Paralympic Summer Games, she won a gold medal in Women's Javelin B2, silver medal in Women's Shot Put B2, silver medal in Women's Pentathlon B2, and bronze medal in Women's Long Jump B2.

At the 1992 Paralympic Summer Games, she won bronze medals in Women's Discus Throw B2, Women's Shot Put B2, and Women's Javelin B1>3.
