= Anne Cecilie Ore =

Norwegian paralympic athlete

Personal information
- Born: 11 October 1978 (age 47) Oslo, Norway

Sport
- Country: Norway
- Sport: Equestrianism
Medal record
Equestrianism
Representing Norway
Paralympic Games
Gold medal – first place	1996 Atlanta	Dressage Grade III
Gold medal – first place	1996 Atlanta	Kur canter Grade III
Silver medal – second place	2000 Sydney	Dressage Championship Grade III
Silver medal – second place	2000 Sydney	Dressage Freestyle Grade III
Bronze medal – third place	2000 Sydney	Team Open

Anne Cecilie Ore (born 11 October 1978) is a Norwegian paralympic athlete. She participated in two Summer Paralympic Games, where she has won five medals in horse riding. She also competes among able-bodied riders.

== Career ==
She competed at the 1996 Paralympic Summer Games, winning a gold medal in riding, dressage, grade 3, and gold medal in riding, kur, grade 3.

She competed at the 2000 Paralympic Summer Games, winning a silver medal in riding, dressage, grade 3, Silver medal in riding, kur, grade 3, and bronze medal in riding, team (together Ann Cathrin Lübbe, Jens Lasse Dokkan and Silje Gillund).
