= Jens Lasse Dokkan =

Norwegian paralympic equestrian (born 1961)

Personal information
- Born: 14 February 1961 (age 65) Røa, Norway

Sport
- Country: Norway
- Sport: Para equestrian
Medal record
Para equestrian
Representing Norway
Paralympic Games
Silver medal – second place	2008 Beijing	Individual championship test grade I
Bronze medal – third place	2008 Beijing	Mixed dressage team
Bronze medal – third place	2000 Sydney	Individual championship test grade I
Bronze medal – third place	2000 Sydney	Individual championship test grade I
Bronze medal – third place	2000 Sydney	Mixed dressage team

Jens Lasse Dokkan (born 14 February 1961) is a Norwegian Paralympic para-equestrian rider.

== Career ==
Dokkan represented Norway at the Paralympic Games in 1996, 2000, 2004, 2008, 2012, 2016, 2020 and in 2024. At the Paralympic Games in 2000 he won a bronze team medal and two individual bronze medals. At the 2008 Paralympic Games he won also a bronze team medal and a silver individual medal. He won also several medals at World Championships and European Championships, including double individual gold at the 2019 FEI European Championships in Rotterdam.
