= Para equestrian =

Type of disability sport

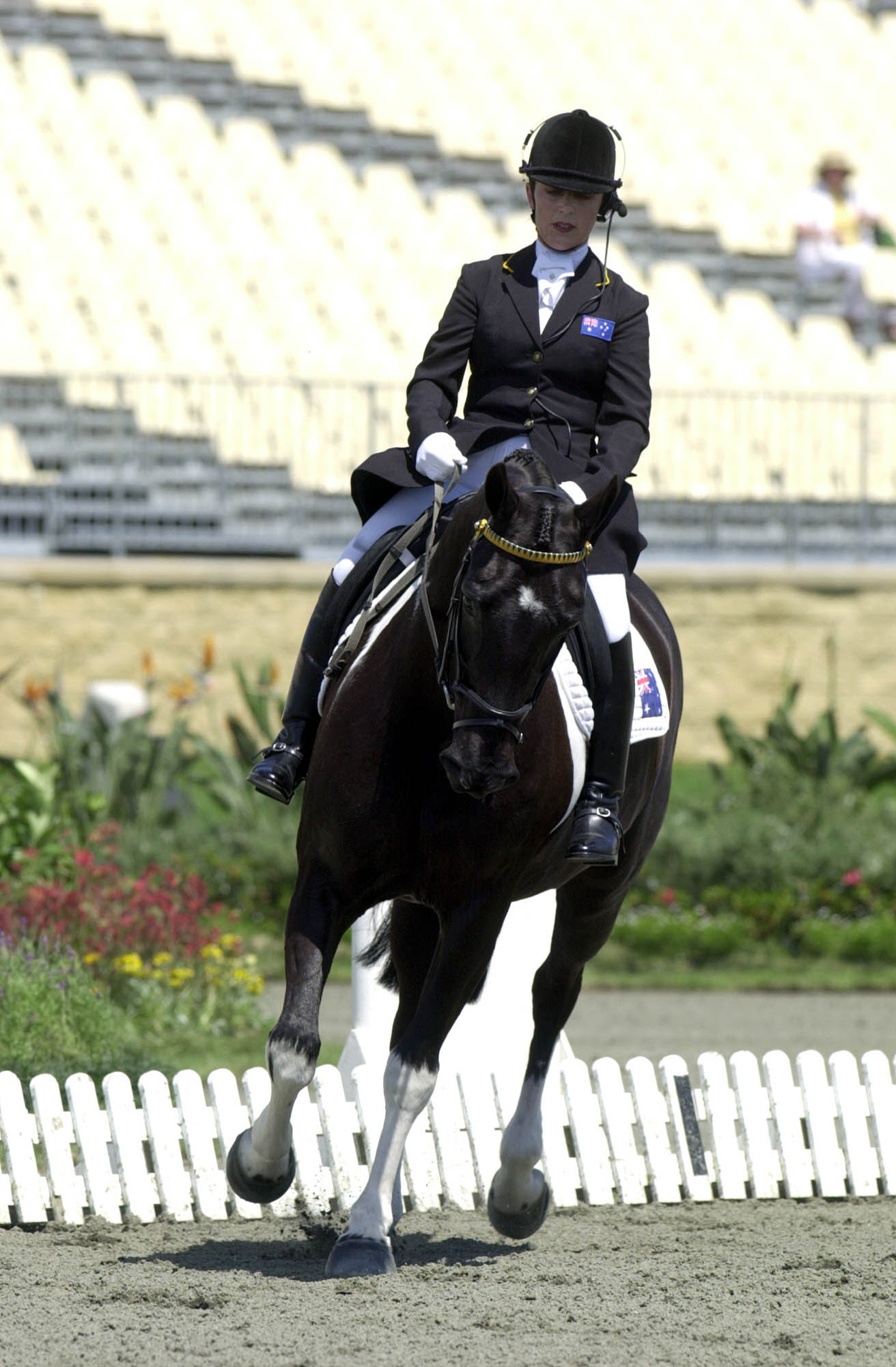
- Julie Higgins and Kaleidoscope (Magpie) at the 2000 Summer Paralympics
- Highest governing body: International Federation for Equestrian Sports (FEI)

Characteristics
- Contact: No
- Team members: Individual and team at international levels
- Mixed-sex: Yes
- Type: Indoor or outdoor
- Equipment: Horse and horse tack
- Venue: Para dressage: arena, indoor or outdoor; Para driving: outdoor

Presence
- Country or region: Worldwide
- Paralympic: 1996 (Para dressage)

Para equestrian is an equestrian sport governed by the International Federation for Equestrian Sports (FEI), and includes two competitive events. One is Para equestrian dressage, which is conducted under the same basic rules as conventional dressage, but with riders divided into different competition grades based on their functional abilities. The other is Para equestrian driving, which operates under the same basic rules as combined driving but places competitors in various grades based on their functional abilities.

== History ==
The first official Paralympic Games was held in Rome in 1960 and Para equestrian dressage was added to the Paralympic Games program in 1996. The FEI brought Para equestrian sport under its umbrella in 2006. Riders with physical disabilities may compete on the same team as people with vision impairment.

== Events ==
There are two separate Para equestrian events sanctioned by FEI, the sport's governing body: they are Para dressage and Para driving. There is also Para showjumping, but it is not sanctioned by FEI. All class events are mixed gendered.

=== Para dressage ===
Dressage events include "Walk Only Tests" for Grade 1, with trot work allowed in freestyle, and "Walk and Trot tests" for Grade 2. The dressage events open to Grade 3 classification included "Walk and Trot but Canter allowed in Freestyle". The dressage events open to Grade 4 classification included "Walk, Trot and Canter and may show lateral work in Freestyle". In these three grades, participants use a 40 x 20 metre arena. The dressage events open to Grade 5 classification included "Walk, Trot, Canter, Canter Half-Pirouettes, 3 and 4 sequence changes and lateral work." At Grade 5 participants move up to the 60 x 20 metre arena. All class events are mixed gendered.

For national team competitions such as the Paralympics, each team consists of three riders, one of whom must be a Grade 1, Grade 2 or Grade 3 rider. As of 2012, people with physical and visual disabilities are eligible to compete.

=== Para driving ===
The other Para equestrian is Para driving. It was first introduced in 1989 in Great Britain, and has been sanctioned by FEI since 2006. It was previously called Carriage Driving.

=== Para showjumping ===
Para showjumping, or Para jumping, is a show jumping event sanctioned by the British Showjumping Association, which runs the Para Jumping League in collaboration with the Riding for the Disabled Association (RDA). As of 2024, para-jumping is not sanctioned by FEI.

== Equipment ==
The sport is the one with one of the highest rates of injury and illness among all Paralympic sports. For this reason, much of the equipment for the sport is developed with this in mind. Much of the equipment uses Velcro and rubber bands so that things can easily breakaway and protect the rider during a fall. There is also a constant balance in developing equipment for Para equestrian to assure that the rider remains in control, and that they are not dragged along by the horse. One of the adaptions made to saddles for Para equestrian is extra padding. One of the companies that specializes in making saddles for people with disabilities is Superacor, Inc. In addition to saddles, Para equestrian riders may use some other form of padding such as a fleece covering for the saddle.

Para equestrian competitors have both a class and a disability profile number. The profile number impacts which equipment a rider can use, with equipment differences existing in the same class.

== Major competitions ==
=== Paralympic Games ===
The Paralympic games host a Para equestrian dressage competition, and have done so since 1996. The Paralympic Games are the second largest equestrian event in the world, only behind the Olympic Games.

It is the only sport on the Paralympic program that includes a live animal.

== Media depiction ==
Historically, Para equestrian riders have been treated by the media as "super-crips". Media coverage suggests that these riders excel at their sport despite the fact that they have a disability. Their riding abilities are rarely considered on their own merits given their disability type. When pictured in media reports, they are rarely depicted in competition on their horses. Instead, they are depicted in tack rooms, outside of a competitive setting.

== In able-bodied equestrian ==
Liz Hartel was 1952 Summer Olympics competitor who was post polio and had a disability. She won a silver at those Games in the dressage competition.

Para equestrian competitors, such as gold medalist Lee Pearson, have expressed frustration when competing against able-bodied competitors because these able-bodied competitors often do not want to compete in the same class as some one with a disability.

== Para equestrian classification ==
The classification system for Para equestrian sport is a graded system based on the degree of physical or visual disability and handled at the international level by the FEI. The sport has eligible classifications for people with physical and vision disabilities. The sport is open to competitors with impaired muscle power, athetosis, impaired passive range of movement, hypertonia, limb deficiency, ataxia, leg length difference, short stature, and vision impairment. They are grouped into five different classes to allow fair competition. These classes are Grade I, Grade II, Grade III, Grade IV and Grade V. The Para equestrian classification does not consider the gender of the rider, as equestriennes compete in mixed gender competitions. Internationally, classification is handled by FEI.

=== History ===
In 1983, classification for cerebral palsy competitors in this sport was done by the Cerebral Palsy-International Sports and Recreation Association (CP-ISRA). They defined cerebral palsy as a non-progressive brain lesion that results in impairment. People with cerebral palsy or non-progressive brain damage were eligible for classification by them. The organisation also dealt with classification for people with similar impairments. For their classification system, people with spina bifida were not eligible unless they had medical evidence of loco-motor dysfunction. People with cerebral palsy and epilepsy were eligible provided the condition did not interfere with their ability to compete. People who had strokes were eligible for classification following medical clearance. Competitors with multiple sclerosis, muscular dystrophy and arthrogryposis were not eligible for classification by CP-ISRA, but were eligible for classification by International Sports Organisation for the Disabled for the Games of Les Autres. The system used for equestrian by the CP-ISRA was originally created for field athletics events.

Because of issues in objectively identifying functionality that plagued the post Barcelona Games, the IPC unveiled plans to develop a new classification system in 2003. This classification system went into effect in 2007, and defined ten different disability types that were eligible to participate on the Paralympic level. It required that classification be sport specific, and served two roles. The first was that it determined eligibility to participate in the sport and that it created specific groups of sportspeople who were eligible to participate and in which class. The IPC left it up to International Federations, in this case FEI, to develop their own classification systems within this framework, with the specification that their classification systems use an evidence based approach developed through research. The fourth edition of FEI's classification system guide was published in January 2015.

=== Classification process and governance ===
Classification at the national level is handled by different organizations. For example, Australian Para equestrian sport and classification is managed by the national sport federation with support from the Australian Paralympic Committee. There are three types of classification available for Australian competitors: provisional, national and international. The first is for club level competitions, the second for state and national competitions, and the third for international competitions.

During classification, classifiers look at several things including a rider's mobility, strength and coordination. After riders are classified, they are giving both a classification and a profile. This profile a number 1 to 39 for Para dressage and 1 to 32 for Para driving. This profile impacts what adaptive equipment riders can use.

=== Para dressage classification ===
Para dressage has five different classes: Grade 1, Grade 2, Grade 3, Grade 4 and Grade 5

The FEI defines this classification as "Grade I. At this level the rider will ride a walk only test. Grade 2, the rider will ride walk with some trot work excluding medium trot." Federation Equestre International (FEI) defines Grade 3 as "At this level the rider will ride a novice level test excluding canter." FEI defines Grade 4 as "At this level the rider will ride a novice level test." The Australian Paralympic Committee (APC) defined this classification as: "Grade 4: Athletes with a physical disability or vision impairment. Riders with moderate unilateral impairment, moderate impairment in four limbs or severe arm impairment. In day to day life, riders are usually ambulant but some may use a wheelchair for longer distances or due to lack of stamina. Riders with a vision impairment who compete in this class have total loss of sight in both eyes (B1)." FEI defines Grade 5 as "At this level the rider will ride an elementary/medium level test" APC defined this classification as: "Grade V:, Athletes with a physical disability or vision impairment. Riders have a physical impairment in one or two limbs (for example limb loss or limb deficiency), or some degree of visual impairment (B2)."

=== Para driving classification ===
Para driving utilizes a different classification system than Para dressage events, and includes only two classes: Grade I and Grade II. Grade 1 is for people who use a wheelchair on a daily basis, and have limited trunk functionality and impairments in their upper limbs. It also includes people who have the ability to walk but have impairments in all of their limbs. The third class of riders it includes is people with severe arm impairments Grade II is for riders who are higher functioning than Grade I riders but who would otherwise be at disadvantage when competing against able-bodied competitors.

== See also ==
- Equestrian events at the Summer Paralympics
- Riding for the Disabled Association
- Therapeutic horseback riding
