= Table tennis at the 2004 Summer Paralympics – Women's individual – Class 6–8 =

Table Tennis - Women's Singles 6-8 at the XII Paralympic Games
- Paralympic Table Tennis
- Venue: Galatsi Olympic Hall
- Dates: 18–21 September 2004
- Competitors: 10 from 8 nations

Medalists
1st place, gold medalist(s)		Zhang Xiaoling	China
2nd place, silver medalist(s)		Marléen Bengtsson-Kovacs	Sweden
3rd place, bronze medalist(s)		Julija Ovsjannikova	Russia

The Women's Singles 6-8 table tennis competition at the 2004 Summer Paralympics was held from 18 to 21 September at the Galatsi Olympic Hall.

Classes 6–10 were for athletes with a physical impairment who competed from a standing position; the lower the number, the greater the impact the impairment had on an athlete’s ability to compete.

The event was won by Zhang Xiaoling, representing China.

== Results ==
=== Preliminaries ===
Qualified for final round

==== Group A ====
Rank	Competitor	MP	W	L	Points	CHN	SVK	POL
1	Zhang Xiaoling (CHN)	2	2	0	6:1	x	3:1	3:0
2	Olga Barbušová (SVK)	2	1	1	4:5	1:3	x	3:2
3	Teresa Glińska (POL)	2	0	2	2:6	0:3	2:3	x

==== Group B ====
Rank	Competitor	MP	W	L	Points	POL	CZE	RUS
1	Mirosława Turowska (POL)	2	2	0	6:1	x	3:1	3:0
2	Jaroslava Janeckova (CZE)	2	1	1	4:5	1:3	x	3:2
3	Raisa Tchebanika (RUS)	2	0	2	2:6	0:3	2:3	x

==== Group C ====
Rank	Competitor	MP	W	L	Points	SWE	RUS	FRA	ARG
1	Marléen Bengtsson-Kovacs (SWE)	3	3	0	9:0	x	3:0	3:0	3:0
2	Julija Ovsjannikova (RUS)	3	2	1	6:3	0:3	x	3:0	3:0
3	Bernadette Darvand (FRA)	3	1	2	3:6	0:3	0:3	x	3:0
4	Giselle Munoz (ARG)	3	0	3	0:9	0:3	0:3	0:3	x

=== Competition bracket ===
Quarterfinals
Jaroslava Janeckova (CZE)	1
Julija Ovsjannikova (RUS)	3
Marléen Bengtsson-Kovacs (SWE)	3
Olga Barbušová (SVK)	0

Semifinals
Zhang Xiaoling (CHN)	3
Julija Ovsjannikova (RUS)	0
Marléen Bengtsson-Kovacs (SWE)	3
Mirosława Turowska (POL)	2

Finals
Zhang Xiaoling (CHN)	3
Marléen Bengtsson-Kovacs (SWE)	1
Third place
Julija Ovsjannikova (RUS)	3
Mirosława Turowska (POL)	1
