= Swimming at the 2004 Summer Paralympics – Men's 50 metre freestyle S6 =

Men's 50m Freestyle S6 at the XII Paralympic Games
- Paralympic Swimming
- Venue: Olympic Aquatic Centre
- Dates: 27 September 2004
- Competitors: 15 from 11 nations
- Winning time: 30.80

Medalists
1st place, gold medalist(s)		Yin Jianhua	China
2nd place, silver medalist(s)		Daniel Vidal	Spain
3rd place, bronze medalist(s)		Anders Olsson	Sweden

The Men's 50 metre freestyle S6 swimming event at the 2004 Summer Paralympics was competed on 27 September. It was won by Yin Jianhua, representing China.

== 1st round ==
Qualified for final round

Heat 1

27 Sept. 2004, morning session

Rank	Athlete	Time	Notes
1	Daniel Vidal (ESP)	32.33	
2	Anders Olsson (SWE)	32.71	
3	Igor Plotnikov (RUS)	33.47	
4	Danijel Pavlinec (SLO)	33.87	
5	Luis Silva (BRA)	34.12	
6	Daisuke Maeda (JPN)	35.14	
7	Tang Yuan (CHN)	40.31	

Heat 2

27 Sept. 2004, morning session

Rank	Athlete	Time	Notes
1	Yin Jianhua (CHN)	31.29	
2	Peter Lund Andersen (DEN)	32.55	
3	Sebastian Iwanow (GER)	32.79	
4	Adriano Lima (BRA)	33.01	
5	Andreas Potamitis (CYP)	33.72	
6	Zhang Jinbo (CHN)	34.27	
7	Swen Michaelis (GER)	34.99	
8	Alastair Smales (AUS)	35.11	

== Final round ==
27 Sept. 2004, evening session

Rank	Athlete	Time	Notes
1st place, gold medalist(s)	Yin Jianhua (CHN)	30.80	WR
2nd place, silver medalist(s)	Daniel Vidal (ESP)	31.37	
3rd place, bronze medalist(s)	Anders Olsson (SWE)	31.90	
4	Peter Lund Andersen (DEN)	32.01	
5	Sebastian Iwanow (GER)	32.30	
6	Adriano Lima (BRA)	33.06	
7	Andreas Potamitis (CYP)	33.41	
8	Igor Plotnikov (RUS)	34.49	
