= Swimming at the 2004 Summer Paralympics – Men's 50 metre freestyle S10 =

Paralympic Swimming Event

Men's 50m Freestyle S10 at the XII Paralympic Games
- Paralympic Swimming
- Venue: Olympic Aquatic Centre
- Dates: 26–24 September 2004
- Competitors: 16 from 12 nations

The Men's 50 metre freestyle S10 swimming event at the 2004 Summer Paralympics was competed from 26 to 24 September.Benoît Huot won the competition representing Canada with a world record time of 24.71 seconds.

== 1st round ==
Qualified for final round

Heat 1

26 Sept. 2004, morning session

Rank	Athlete	Time	Notes
1	Justin Zook (USA)	25.83	
2	Danilo Glasser (BRA)	25.89	
3	Daniel Bell (AUS)	26.54	
4	Claus Taudorf (DEN)	26.71	
5	Robert Welbourn (GBR)	26.74	
6	Filip Coufal (CZE)	26.94	
7	Jody Cundy (GBR)	27.14	
8	Andriy Kovalyov (UKR)	27.81	

Heat 2

26 Sept. 2004, morning session

Rank	Athlete	Time	Notes
1	Benoît Huot (CAN)	25.32	PR
2	David Levecq (ESP)	25.98	
3	Alexandre Shchelotchkov (RUS)	26.23	
4	Graham Edmunds (GBR)	26.27	
5	Mike van der Zanden (NED)	26.63	
6	Rod Welsh (AUS)	26.71	
7	Priyadharshana Kalugala (SRI)	27.39	
8	Marcelo Collet (BRA)	27.71	

Swim off

Rank	Athlete	Time	Notes
1	Claus Taudorf (DEN)	26.66	
2	Rod Welsh (AUS)	27.49	

== Final ==
Rank	Athlete	Time	Notes
1st place, gold medalist(s)	Benoît Huot (CAN)	24.71	WR
2nd place, silver medalist(s)	David Levecq (ESP)	25.52	
3rd place, bronze medalist(s)	Justin Zook (USA)	25.61	
4	Alexandre Shchelotchkov (RUS)	25.83	
5	Danilo Glasser (BRA)	25.86	
6	Graham Edmunds (GBR)	26.23	
7	Mike van der Zanden (NED)	26.49	
8	Daniel Bell (AUS)	26.62	
