= Swimming at the 2004 Summer Paralympics – Men's 100 metre freestyle S10 =

Men's 100m Freestyle S10 at the XII Paralympic Games
- Paralympic Swimming
- Venue: Olympic Aquatic Centre
- Dates: 21 September 2004
- Competitors: 17 from 12 nations
- Winning time: 53.73

Medalists
1st place, gold medalist(s)		Benoît Huot	Canada
2nd place, silver medalist(s)		David Levecq	Spain
3rd place, bronze medalist(s)		Mike van der Zanden	Netherlands

The Men's 100 metre freestyle S10 swimming event at the 2004 Summer Paralympics was competed on 21 September. It was won by Benoît Huot, representing Canada.

== 1st round ==
Qualified for final round

Heat 1

21 Sept. 2004, morning session

Rank	Athlete	Time	Notes
1	Robert Welbourn (GBR)	57.12	
2	Daniel Bell (AUS)	57.56	
3	Piotr Pijanowski (POL)	57.86	
4	Claus Taudorf (DEN)	58.14	
5	Marc Woods (GBR)	59.97	

Heat 2

21 Sept. 2004, morning session

Rank	Athlete	Time	Notes
1	David Levecq (ESP)	56.87	
2	Mike van der Zanden (NED)	57.14	
3	Lukas Urbanek (CZE)	58.64	
4	Alexandre Shchelotchkov (RUS)	58.76	
5	Marcelo Collet (BRA)	58.92	
6	Yu Qi Min (CHN)	1:02.48	

Heat 3

21 Sept. 2004, morning session

Rank	Athlete	Time	Notes
1	Benoît Huot (CAN)	55.28	
2	Justin Zook (USA)	56.95	
3	Rod Welsh (AUS)	57.35	
4	Filip Coufal (CZE)	58.13	
5	Graham Edmunds (GBR)	58.33	
6	Danilo Glasser (BRA)	59.04	

== Final round ==
21 Sept. 2004, evening session

Rank	Athlete	Time	Notes
1st place, gold medalist(s)	Benoît Huot (CAN)	53.73	WR
2nd place, silver medalist(s)	David Levecq (ESP)	56.32	
3rd place, bronze medalist(s)	Mike van der Zanden (NED)	56.47	
4	Justin Zook (USA)	56.50	
5	Robert Welbourn (GBR)	56.68	
6	Rod Welsh (AUS)	57.06	
7	Daniel Bell (AUS)	57.31	
8	Piotr Pijanowski (POL)	57.32	
