= Swimming at the 2004 Summer Paralympics – Men's 50 metre butterfly S6 =

Men's 50m Butterfly S6 at the XII Paralympic Games
- Paralympic Swimming
- Venue: Olympic Aquatic Centre
- Dates: 25 September 2004
- Competitors: 13 from 9 nations
- Winning time: 32.82

Medalists
1st place, gold medalist(s)		Li Peng	China
2nd place, silver medalist(s)		Igor Plotnikov	Russia
3rd place, bronze medalist(s)		Daniel Vidal	Spain

The Men's 50 metre butterfly S6 swimming event at the 2004 Summer Paralympics was competed on 25 September. It was won by Li Peng, representing China.

== 1st round ==
Qualified for final round

Heat 1

25 Sept. 2004, morning session

Rank	Athlete	Time	Notes
1	Alastair Smales (AUS)	34.49	
2	Daniel Vidal (ESP)	34.53	
3	Sascha Kindred (GBR)	35.50	
4	Luis Silva (BRA)	36.37	
5	Stian Helgeland (NOR)	36.95	
6	Xu Qing Qing (CHN)	37.08	

Heat 2

25 Sept. 2004, morning session

Rank	Athlete	Time	Notes
1	Igor Plotnikov (RUS)	32.51	WR
2	Li Peng (CHN)	33.09	
3	Xia Kai (CHN)	34.26	
4	Mateusz Michalski (POL)	37.20	
5	Daisuke Maeda (JPN)	38.31	
6	Adriano Lima (BRA)	38.78	
7	Pablo Cimadevilla (ESP)	40.78	

== Final round ==
25 Sept. 2004, evening session

Rank	Athlete	Time	Notes
1st place, gold medalist(s)	Li Peng (CHN)	32.82	
2nd place, silver medalist(s)	Igor Plotnikov (RUS)	33.07	
3rd place, bronze medalist(s)	Daniel Vidal (ESP)	33.56	
4	Xia Kai (CHN)	34.20	
5	Alastair Smales (AUS)	34.34	
6	Sascha Kindred (GBR)	35.17	
7	Luis Silva (BRA)	35.96	
8	Stian Helgeland (NOR)	37.05	
