= Swimming at the 2004 Summer Paralympics – Men's 100 metre breaststroke SB9 =

Men's 100m Breaststroke SB9 at the XII Paralympic Games
- Paralympic Swimming
- Venue: Olympic Aquatic Centre
- Dates: 22 September 2004
- Competitors: 14 from 9 nations
- Winning time: 1:11.13

Medalists
| 1st place, gold medalist(s) | | Dmitri Poline | Russia |
| 2nd place, silver medalist(s) | | Daniel Bell | Australia |
| 3rd place, bronze medalist(s) | | Denis Dorogaev | Russia |

The Men's 100 metre breaststroke SB9 swimming event at the 2004 Summer Paralympics was competed on 22 September. It was won by Dmitri Poline, representing Russia.

== 1st round ==
| Qualified for next round |

Heat 1

22 Sept. 2004, morning session

| Rank | Athlete | Time | Notes |
|---|---|---|---|
| 1 | Daniel Bell (AUS) | 1:12.10 | WR |
| 2 | Huang Zhaohang (CHN) | 1:14.17 | |
| 3 | Sven Decaesstecker (BEL) | 1:14.54 | |
| 4 | Rick Pendleton (AUS) | 1:14.98 | |
| 5 | Pablo Galindo (ESP) | 1:18.04 | |
| 6 | Callum Lawson (GBR) | 1:18.22 | |
| 7 | Javier Crespo (ESP) | 1:18.95 | |

Heat 2

22 Sept. 2004, morning session

| Rank | Athlete | Time | Notes |
|---|---|---|---|
| 1 | Dmitri Poline (RUS) | 1:13.30 | |
| 2 | Denis Dorogaev (RUS) | 1:13.57 | |
| 3 | Benoît Huot (CAN) | 1:15.17 | |
| 4 | Claus Taudorf (DEN) | 1:15.97 | |
| 5 | Li Jun (CHN) | 1:17.39 | |
| 6 | Andriy Kovalyov (UKR) | 1:18.79 | |
| 7 | Matthew Cowdrey (AUS) | 1:18.92 | |

== Final round ==
22 Sept. 2004, evening session

| Rank | Athlete | Time | Notes |
|---|---|---|---|
| 1st place, gold medalist(s) | Dmitri Poline (RUS) | 1:11.13 | WR |
| 2nd place, silver medalist(s) | Daniel Bell (AUS) | 1:11.79 | |
| 3rd place, bronze medalist(s) | Denis Dorogaev (RUS) | 1:11.91 | |
| 4 | Huang Zhaohang (CHN) | 1:13.74 | |
| 5 | Sven Decaesstecker (BEL) | 1:14.12 | |
| 6 | Benoît Huot (CAN) | 1:14.48 | |
| 7 | Rick Pendleton (AUS) | 1:14.75 | |
| 8 | Claus Taudorf (DEN) | 1:16.38 | |
