= Sweden at the 2004 Summer Paralympics =

- IPC code: SWE
- NPC: Swedish Parasports Federation

in Athens
- Competitors: 41 in 10 sports
- Flag bearer: Lars Löfström
- Medals Ranked 21st: Gold 8 Silver 7 Bronze 6 Total 21

Summer Paralympics appearances (overview)
- 1960; 1964; 1968; 1972; 1976; 1980; 1984; 1988; 1992; 1996; 2000; 2004; 2008; 2012; 2016; 2020; 2024

Sweden competed at the 2004 Summer Paralympics in Athens, Greece. The team included 41 athletes, 32 men and 9 women. Competitors from Sweden won 21 medals, including 8 gold, 7 silver and 6 bronze to finish 21st in the medal table.

== Medalists ==
Medal	Name	Sport	Event
Gold	Sandra Erikson	Swimming	Women's 50 m butterfly S4
Gold	Jonas Jacobsson	Shooting	Men's air rifle standing SH1
Gold	Jonas Jacobsson	Shooting	Men's free rifle 3x40 SH1
Gold	Jonas Jacobsson	Shooting	Mixed air rifle prone SH1
Gold	Jonas Jacobsson	Shooting	Mixed free rifle prone SH1
Gold	Anders Olsson	Swimming	Men's 400 m freestyle S6
Gold	Iréne Slättengren	Equestrian	Individual championship dressage GII
Gold	Iréne Slättengren	Equestrian	Individual freestyle dressage GII
Silver	Fredrik Andersson	Table tennis	Men's singles class 10
Silver	Mikael Aspegren; Jimmy Björkstrand; Niklas Hultgvist; Oskar Kuus; Mikael Rendahl; Boris Samuelsson	Goalball	Men's tournament
Silver	Marléen Bengtsson-Kovacs	Table tennis	Women's singles class 6–8
Silver	Anders Grönberg	Archery	Men's W1
Silver	Thomas Johansson	Shooting	Mixed air rifle standing SH2
Silver	Tim Johansson	Athletics	Men's 200 metres T51
Silver	Madelene Nordlund	Athletics	Women's 400 metres T53
Bronze	Fredrik Andersson; Magnus Andrée	Table tennis	Men's teams class 6–7
Bronze	Simon Itkonen; Linus Lönnberg	Table tennis	Men's teams class 10
Bronze	Madelene Nordlund	Athletics	Women's 800 metres T53
Bronze	Anders Olsson	Swimming	Men's 50 m freestyle S6
Bronze	Anders Olsson	Swimming	Men's 100 m freestyle S6
Bronze	Viktoria Wedin	Shooting	Mixed air rifle standing SH2

== Sports ==
=== Archery ===
==== Men ====
Athlete	Event	Ranking round		Round of 32	Round of 16	Quarterfinals	Semifinals	Finals	
Athlete	Event	Score	Seed	Opposition score	Opposition score	Opposition score	Opposition score	Opposition score	Rank
Anders Groenberg	Men's individual W1	661	2	N/A	Bye	Hassberg (GER); W 102-102*	Sebek (CZE); W 99-96	Cavanagh (GBR); L 102-108	2nd place, silver medalist(s)

- Anders Groenberg's quarterfinal against Germany's Eric Hassberg was decided by additional arrows. Anders won 9:9, 8:8, 8:x and went through to the semifinals.

=== Athletics ===
==== Men's track ====
Athlete	Class	Event	Heats		Semifinal		Final	
Athlete	Class	Event	Result	Rank	Result	Rank	Result	Rank
Tim Johansson	T51	200m	N/A				40.15	2nd place, silver medalist(s)
Tim Johansson	T51	Marathon	N/A				DNF	
Christer Lenander	T38	100m	12.64	9	did not advance			
Per Vesterlund	T52	800m	2:12.66	9	did not advance			
Per Vesterlund	T52	1500m	4:05.49	7 q	N/A		4:04.32	6
Per Vesterlund	T52	5000m	N/A				14:30.33	7
Per Vesterlund	T52	Marathon	N/A				2:26:09	5

==== Men's field ====
Athlete	Class	Event	Final		
Athlete	Class	Event	Result	Points	Rank
Christer Lenander	F36-38	Long jump	5.59	929	8
Harald von Koch	P44	Pentathlon	3324		8

==== Women's track ====
Athlete	Class	Event	Heats		Semifinal		Final	
Athlete	Class	Event	Result	Rank	Result	Rank	Result	Rank
Madelene Nordlund	T53	400m	57.37 PR	1 Q	N/A		58.32	2nd place, silver medalist(s)
Madelene Nordlund	T53	800m	1:58.03	4 q	N/A		2:00.30	3rd place, bronze medalist(s)

=== Cycling ===
==== Men's road ====
Athlete	Event	Time	Rank
Michael Lindgren	Men's road race/time trial LC1	2:39:17	6

=== Equestrian ===
Athlete	Event	Total	
Athlete	Event	Score	Rank
Kerstin Englund	Mixed individual championship test grade II	68.091	6
Kerstin Englund	Mixed individual freestyle test grade II	71.389	8
Gabriella Loef	Mixed individual championship test grade III	64.720	8
Gabriella Loef	Mixed individual freestyle test grade III	71.778	6
Irene Slaettengren	Mixed individual championship test grade II	72.636	1st place, gold medalist(s)
Irene Slaettengren	Mixed individual freestyle test grade II	78.944	1st place, gold medalist(s)
Berit Svensson	Mixed individual championship test grade III	64.560	9
Berit Svensson	Mixed individual freestyle test grade III	68.500	10

==== Team ====
Athlete	Event	Total	
Athlete	Event	Total	Rank
Kerstin Englund; Gabriella Loef; Irene Slaettengren; Berit Svensson	Team	410.148	4

=== Goalball ===
The men's goalball team won the silver medal after being defeated by Denmark in the gold medal final.

==== Players ====
- Mikael Aspergen
- Jimmy Bjoerkstrand
- Niklas Hultqvist
- Oskar Kuus
- Mikael Rendahl
- Boris Samuelsson

==== Tournament ====
Game	Match	Score	Rank
1	Sweden vs. Denmark (DEN)	3 – 3	2 Q
2	Sweden vs. United States (USA)	1 – 1	2 Q
3	Sweden vs. Canada (CAN)	4 – 4	2 Q
4	Sweden vs. Germany (GER)	3 – 1	2 Q
5	Sweden vs. Greece (GRE)	10 – 5	2 Q
Quarterfinals	Sweden vs. Finland (FIN)	5 – 1	W
Semifinals	Sweden vs. Canada (CAN)	5 – 3	W
Gold medal final	Sweden vs. Denmark (DEN)	5 – 7	2nd place, silver medalist(s)

=== Shooting ===
==== Men ====
Athlete	Event	Qualification		Final		
Athlete	Event	Score	Rank	Score	Total	Rank
Jonas Jacobsson	Men's 10m air rifle standing SH1	593 =WR	1 Q	100.4	693.4	1st place, gold medalist(s)
Jonas Jacobsson	Men's 50m rifle 3 positions SH1	1162 WR	1 Q	99.1	1261.1 WR	1st place, gold medalist(s)
Jonas Jacobsson	Mixed 10m air rifle prone SH1	600 =WR	1 Q	105.3	705.3	1st place, gold medalist(s)
Jonas Jacobsson	Mixed 50m rifle prone SH1	597 WR	1 Q	104.4	701.4 WR	1st place, gold medalist(s)
Thomas Johansson	Mixed 10m air rifle prone SH1	600 =WR	1 Q	103.9	703.9	4
Thomas Johansson	Mixed 10m air rifle standing SH2	598	4 Q	105.4	703.4	2nd place, silver medalist(s)
Thomas Johansson	Mixed 50m rifle prone SH1	577	23	did not advance		
Kenneth Pettersson	Men's 10m air pistol SH1	558	10	did not advance		
Kenneth Pettersson	Mixed 25m pistol SH1	560	8 Q	88.5	648.5	8
Kenneth Pettersson	Mixed 50m pistol SH1	495	24	did not advance		
Bjorn Samuelsson	Men's 10m air rifle standing SH1	555	22	did not advance		
Bjorn Samuelsson	Men's 50m rifle 3 positions SH1	1092	20	did not advance		
Bjorn Samuelsson	Mixed 50m rifle prone SH1	572	29	did not advance		

==== Women ====
Athlete	Event	Qualification		Final		
Athlete	Event	Score	Rank	Score	Total	Rank
Lotta Helsinger	Mixed 10m air rifle prone SH1	599	5 Q	103.7	702.7	8
Lotta Helsinger	Women's 10m air rifle standing SH1	381	10	did not advance		
Viktoria Wedin	Mixed 10m air rifle prone SH2	599	6 Q	104.5	703.5	7
Viktoria Wedin	Mixed 10m air rifle standing SH2	599	2 Q	103.7	702.7	3rd place, bronze medalist(s)

=== Swimming ===
==== Men ====
Athlete	Class	Event	Heats		Final	
Athlete	Class	Event	Result	Rank	Result	Rank
Anders Olsson	S6	50m freestyle	32.71	4 Q	31.90	3rd place, bronze medalist(s)
Anders Olsson	S6	100m freestyle	1:09.22	2 Q	1:09.47	3rd place, bronze medalist(s)
Anders Olsson	S6	400m freestyle	5:11.63 PR	1 Q	5:03.76 WR	1st place, gold medalist(s)
Anders Olsson	SB5	100m breaststroke	1:45.69	8 Q	1:44.68	8
Anders Olsson	SM6	200m individual medley	3:12.14	9	did not advance	
Alex Racoveanu	S9	100m butterfly	1:06.53	8 Q	1:05.77	5
Alex Racoveanu	SB8	100m breaststroke	1:23.74	8 Q	1:23.30	6
Alex Racoveanu	SM9	200m individual medley	2:38.40	10	did not advance	

==== Women ====
Athlete	Class	Event	Heats		Final	
Athlete	Class	Event	Result	Rank	Result	Rank
Sandra Erikson	S4	50m freestyle	57.09	8 Q	56.54	7
Sandra Erikson	S4	100m freestyle	2:12.11	8 Q	2:09.49	8
Sandra Erikson	S4	50m butterfly	N/A		56.36 WR	1st place, gold medalist(s)
Sandra Erikson	SM4	150m individual medley	4:15.07	10	did not advance	

=== Table tennis ===
==== Men ====
Athlete	Event	Preliminaries				Round of 16	Quarterfinals	Semifinals	Final / BM	
Athlete	Event	Opposition Result	Opposition Result	Opposition Result	Rank	Opposition Result	Opposition Result	Opposition Result	Opposition Result	Rank
Fredrik Andersson	Men's singles 10	Gaspar (SVK); L 1-3	Puglisi (ITA); W 3-0	Bereczki (HUN); W 3-0	2 Q	N/A	de la Bourdonnaye (FRA); W 3-1	Ruiz (ESP); W 3-2	Gaspar (SVK); L 1-3	2nd place, silver medalist(s)
Ernst Bolldén	Men's singles 5	Robles (ESP); L 0-3	Nilsen (RSA); W 3-1	Kalyvas (GRE); W 3-0	2 Q	Chang (TPE); L 1-3	did not advance			
Patrik Hoegstedt	Men's singles 5	Kim (KOR); L 0-3	Djurasinovic (SCG); L 2-3	Pazaran (MEX); L 1-3	4	did not advance				
Simon Itkonen	Men's singles 6	Schmidt (GER); L 2-3	Jensen (DEN); L 2-3	Solis (CHI); W 3-0	3	did not advance				
Oerjan Kylevik	Men's singles 3	Piñas (ESP); L 2–3	Wu (TPE); W 3–1	Valka (SVK); W 3–1	2 Q	Robin (FRA); L 0–3	did not advance			
Linus Loennberg	Men's singles 7	Wollmert (GER); L 0-3	Qin (CHN); L 0-3	Popov (UKR); L 1-3	4	did not advance				

==== Women ====
Athlete	Event	Preliminaries				Quarterfinals	Semifinals	Final / BM	
Athlete	Event	Opposition Result	Opposition Result	Opposition Result	Rank	Opposition Result	Opposition Result	Opposition Result	Rank
Marléen Bengtsson-Kovacs	Women's singles 6-8	Ovsjannikova (RUS); W 3–0	Darvand (FRA); W 3–0	Munoz (ARG); W 3–0	1 Q	Barbusova (SVK); W 3–0	Turowska (POL); W 3-2	Zhang (CHN); L 1-3	2nd place, silver medalist(s)

==== Teams ====
Athlete	Event	Preliminaries				Quarterfinals	Semifinals	Final / BM	
Athlete	Event	Opposition Result	Opposition Result	Opposition Result	Rank	Opposition Result	Opposition Result	Opposition Result	Rank
Ernst Bolldén; Patrik Hoegstedt; Oerjan Kylevik	Men's team 5	Chinese Taipei (TPE); L 0-3	Greece (GRE); W 3-0	N/A	2 Q	Czech Republic (CZE); L 1-3	did not advance		
Simon Itkonen; Linus Loennberg	Men's team 6-7	France (FRA); W 3-2	Denmark (DEN); L 2-3	Netherlands (NED); W 3-0	3	did not advance			3rd place, bronze medalist(s)
Magnus Andree; Fredrik Andersson	Men's team 10	Czech Republic (CZE); L 1-3	Italy (ITA); W 3-0	Hungary (HUN); W 3-1	2 Q	N/A	China (CHN); L 1-3	Czech Republic (CZE); W 3-1	3rd place, bronze medalist(s)

=== Wheelchair tennis ===
Athlete	Class	Event	Round of 64	Round of 32	Round of 16	Quarterfinals	Semifinals	Finals
Athlete	Class	Event	Opposition Result	Opposition Result	Opposition Result	Opposition Result	Opposition Result	Opposition Result
Niclas Larsson	Open	Men's singles	Ammerlaan (NED); L 0–6, 0–6	did not advance				
Stefan Olsson	Open	Men's singles	Kumarasiri (SRI); W 6–1, 6–0	Brychta (CZE); L 5–7, 2–6	did not advance			
Peter Wikstrom	Open	Men's singles	Krieghofer (AUT); W 6–3, 6–1	Plowman (GBR); W 6–2, 6–0	Kunieda (JPN); L 3–6, 6–4, 3–6	did not advance		
Stefan Olsson; Peter Wikstrom	Open	Men's doubles	N/A	Onasie (INA) / Sugiharto (INA); W 6–0, 6–0	Baumgartner (AUT) / Legner (AUT); W 6–4, 6–4	Jérémiasz (FRA) / Majdi (FRA); L 1–6, 2–6	did not advance	

== See also ==
- Sweden at the Paralympics
- Sweden at the 2004 Summer Olympics
