= Swimming at the 2004 Summer Paralympics – Men's 100 metre backstroke S6 =

Men's 100m Backstroke S6 at the XII Paralympic Games
- Paralympic Swimming
- Venue: Olympic Aquatic Centre
- Dates: 21 September 2004
- Competitors: 13 from 10 nations
- Winning time: 1:13.99

Medalists
1st place, gold medalist(s)		Igor Plotnikov	Russia
2nd place, silver medalist(s)		Tang Yuan	China
3rd place, bronze medalist(s)		Mateusz Michalski	Poland

The Men's 100 metre backstroke S6 swimming event at the 2004 Summer Paralympics was competed on 21 September. It was won by Igor Plotnikov, representing Russia.

== 1st round ==
Qualified for next round

Heat 1

21 Sept. 2004, morning session

Rank	Athlete	Time	Notes
1	Tang Yuan (CHN)	1:19.71	
2	Adam Purdy (CAN)	1:19.92	
3	Swen Michaelis (GER)	1:21.46	
4	Yang Yuan Run (CHN)	1:25.53	
5	Sebastian Iwanow (GER)	1:26.98	
6	Prajim Rieangsantien (THA)	1:28.62	

Heat 2

21 Sept. 2004, morning session

Rank	Athlete	Time	Notes
1	Igor Plotnikov (RUS)	1:14.71	WR
2	Mateusz Michalski (POL)	1:19.40	
3	Soren Moller (DEN)	1:22.63	
4	Diego Pastore (ARG)	1:30.08	
5	Kasper Engel (NED)	1:31.09	
6	Yin Jianhua (CHN)	1:34.54	
7	Ivanildo Vasconcelos (BRA)	1:34.85	

== Final round ==
21 Sept. 2004, evening session

Rank	Athlete	Time	Notes
1st place, gold medalist(s)	Igor Plotnikov (RUS)	1:13.99	WR
2nd place, silver medalist(s)	Tang Yuan (CHN)	1:17.91	
3rd place, bronze medalist(s)	Mateusz Michalski (POL)	1:18.52	
4	Adam Purdy (CAN)	1:18.97	
5	Swen Michaelis (GER)	1:20.62	
6	Soren Moller (DEN)	1:22.91	
7	Yang Yuan Run (CHN)	1:24.21	
8	Sebastian Iwanow (GER)	1:28.27	
