= Swimming at the 2008 Summer Paralympics – Men's 100 metre breaststroke SB9 =

Men's 100m breaststroke event

Men's 100m Breaststroke SB9 at the XIII Paralympic Games
- Venue: Beijing National Aquatics Center
- Dates: 10 September
- Competitors: 13 from 9 nations
- Winning time: 1:08.58

Medalists
1st place, gold medalist(s)		Kevin Paul	South Africa
2nd place, silver medalist(s)		Lin Furong	China
3rd place, bronze medalist(s)		Denis Dorogaev	Russia

The men's 100m breaststroke SB9 event at the 2008 Summer Paralympics took place at the Beijing National Aquatics Center on 10 September. There were two heats; the swimmers with the eight fastest times advanced to the final.

== Results ==
=== Heats ===
Competed from 09:00.

==== Heat 1 ====
Rank	Name	Nationality	Time	Notes
1	Kevin Paul	South Africa	1:08.70	Q, WR
2	Lin Furong	China	1:09.97	Q
3	Denis Dorogaev	Russia	1:11.28	Q
4	Vincent Rupp	France	1:14.31	Q
5	Jeremy Tidy	Australia	1:16.04	
6	Kendall Bailey	United States	1:20.82	

==== Heat 2 ====
Rank	Name	Nationality	Time	Notes
1	Rick Pendleton	Australia	1:12.34	Q
2	Dmitry Polin	Russia	1:12.47	Q
3	Javier Crespo	Spain	1:12.87	Q
4	Sven Decaesstecker	Belgium	1:14.30	Q
5	Daniel Bell	Australia	1:14.33	
6	Christoph Weber	Germany	1:15.97	
	Cody Bureau	United States		DQ

=== Final ===
Competed at 17:00.

Rank	Name	Nationality	Time	Notes
1st place, gold medalist(s)	Kevin Paul	South Africa	1:08.58	WR
2nd place, silver medalist(s)	Lin Furong	China	1:09.58	
3rd place, bronze medalist(s)	Denis Dorogaev	Russia	1:10.16	
4	Rick Pendleton	Australia	1:10.88	
5	Dmitry Polin	Russia	1:11.74	
6	Javier Crespo	Spain	1:12.31	
7	Vincent Rupp	France	1:14.54	
8	Sven Decaesstecker	Belgium	1:15.29	

Q = qualified for final. WR = World Record. DQ = Disqualified.
