= Swimming at the 2008 Summer Paralympics – Men's 100 metre butterfly S10 =

Men's 100m Butterfly S10 at the XIII Paralympic Games
- Venue: Beijing National Aquatics Center
- Dates: 8 September
- Competitors: 13 from 10 nations
- Winning time: 56.47

Medalists
1st place, gold medalist(s)		André Brasil	Brazil
2nd place, silver medalist(s)		David Julian Levecq	Spain
3rd place, bronze medalist(s)		Mike van der Zanden	Netherlands

The men's 100m butterfly S10 event at the 2008 Summer Paralympics took place at the Beijing National Aquatics Center on 8 September. There were two heats; the swimmers with the eight fastest times advanced to the final.

== Results ==
=== Heats ===
Competed from 09:00.

==== Heat 1 ====
Rank	Name	Nationality	Time	Notes
1	David Julian Levecq	Spain	59.80	Q
2	Mike van der Zanden	Netherlands	59.97	Q
3	Rick Pendleton	Australia	1:00.96	Q
4	Jeremy Tidy	Australia	1:01.73	
4	Justin Zook	United States	1:01.73	
6	Robert Welbourn	Great Britain	1:03.41	

==== Heat 2 ====
Rank	Name	Nationality	Time	Notes
1	André Brasil	Brazil	59.13	Q, PR
2	Benoît Huot	Canada	59.68	Q
3	Roy Tobis	Germany	1:00.18	Q
4	Daniel Bell	Australia	1:00.24	Q
5	Lucas Ludwig	Germany	1:01.14	Q
6	Achmat Hassiem	South Africa	1:01.61	
7	Denys Graniuk	Ukraine	1:05.86	

=== Final ===
Competed at 17:00.

Rank	Name	Nationality	Time	Notes
1st place, gold medalist(s)	André Brasil	Brazil	56.47	WR
2nd place, silver medalist(s)	David Julian Levecq	Spain	58.53	
3rd place, bronze medalist(s)	Mike van der Zanden	Netherlands	59.39	
4	Benoît Huot	Canada	59.68	
5	Daniel Bell	Australia	59.85	
6	Rick Pendleton	Australia	59.87	
7	Lucas Ludwig	Germany	1:00.46	
8	Roy Tobis	Germany	1:00.65	

Q = qualified for final. WR = World Record. PR = Paralympic Record.
