= Table tennis at the 2008 Summer Paralympics – Women's individual – Class 8 =

Women's Individual Class 8 at the XIII Paralympic Games
- Venue: Peking University Gymnasium
- Dates: 7 – 11 September 2008
- Competitors: 8 from 6 nations

Medalists
| 1st place, gold medalist(s) | | Thu Kamkasomphou | France |
| 2nd place, silver medalist(s) | | Josefin Abrahamsson | Sweden |
| 3rd place, bronze medalist(s) | | Zhang Xiaoling | China |

The Women's Individual Class 8 table tennis competition at the 2008 Summer Paralympics was held between 7 September and 11 September at the Peking University Gymnasium.

Classes 6–10 were for athletes with a physical impairment who competed from a standing position; the lower the number, the greater the impact the impairment had on an athlete's ability to compete.

The event was won by Thu Kamkasomphou, representing France.

== Results ==
=== Preliminary round ===
| Qualified for the knock-out stages |

==== Group A ====
| Rank | Competitor | MP | W | L | Points | FRA | SWE | SVK | CZE |
|---|---|---|---|---|---|---|---|---|---|
| 1 | Thu Kamkasomphou (FRA) | 3 | 3 | 0 | 9:0 | x | 3:0 | 3:0 | 3:0 |
| 2 | Josefin Abrahamsson (SWE) | 3 | 2 | 1 | 6:4 | 0:3 | x | 3:0 | 3:1 |
| 3 | Olga Barbusova (SVK) | 3 | 1 | 2 | 3:7 | 0:3 | 0:3 | x | 3:1 |
| 4 | Jaroslava Janeckova (CZE) | 3 | 0 | 3 | 2:9 | 0:3 | 1:3 | 1:3 | x |

7 September, 13:20

| Thu Kamkasomphou (FRA) | 11 | 11 | 11 | |
| Olga Barbusova (SVK) | 6 | 5 | 8 | |
| Josefin Abrahamsson (SWE) | 11 | 11 | 7 | 11 |
| Jaroslava Janeckova (CZE) | 7 | 6 | 11 | 6 |

7 September, 20:40

| Olga Barbusova (SVK) | 8 | 11 | 11 | 16 |
| Jaroslava Janeckova (CZE) | 11 | 7 | 9 | 14 |
| Thu Kamkasomphou (FRA) | 11 | 11 | 11 | |
| Josefin Abrahamsson (SWE) | 7 | 6 | 7 | |

8 September, 17:20

| Thu Kamkasomphou (FRA) | 11 | 11 | 11 |
| Jaroslava Janeckova (CZE) | 4 | 5 | 7 |
| Josefin Abrahamsson (SWE) | 11 | 11 | 11 |
| Olga Barbusova (SVK) | 6 | 7 | 8 |

==== Group B ====
| Rank | Competitor | MP | W | L | Points | CHN | FRA | SWE | BRA |
|---|---|---|---|---|---|---|---|---|---|
| 1 | Zhang Xiaoling (CHN) | 3 | 3 | 0 | 9:1 | x | 3:1 | 3:0 | 3:0 |
| 2 | Claire Mairie (FRA) | 3 | 2 | 1 | 7:3 | 1:3 | x | 3:0 | 3:0 |
| 3 | Marleen Bengtsson (SWE) | 3 | 1 | 2 | 3:6 | 0:3 | 0:3 | x | 3:0 |
| 4 | Jane Karla Rodrigues (BRA) | 3 | 0 | 3 | 0:9 | 0:3 | 0:3 | 0:3 | x |

7 September, 13:20

| Claire Mairie (FRA) | 11 | 11 | 11 |
| Marleen Bengtsson (SWE) | 9 | 4 | 4 |
| Zhang Xiaoling (CHN) | 11 | 11 | 11 |
| Jane Karla Rodrigues (BRA) | 7 | 9 | 7 |

7 September, 20:40

| Claire Mairie (FRA) | 11 | 11 | 11 |
| Jane Karla Rodrigues (BRA) | 6 | 7 | 8 |
| Zhang Xiaoling (CHN) | 11 | 11 | 11 |
| Marleen Bengtsson (SWE) | 8 | 9 | 8 |

8 September, 17:20

| Marleen Bengtsson (SWE) | 12 | 11 | 11 | |
| Jane Karla Rodrigues (BRA) | 10 | 8 | 8 | |
| Zhang Xiaoling (CHN) | 11 | 11 | 7 | 16 |
| Claire Mairie (FRA) | 9 | 6 | 11 | 14 |

=== Competition bracket ===
Semifinals: 10 Sep 10:45
Thu Kamkasomphou (FRA) | 11 | 9 | 11 | 11
Claire Mairie (FRA) | 3 | 11 | 8 | 9
Josefin Abrahamsson (SWE) | 1 | 11 | 5 | 11 | 11
Zhang Xiaoling (CHN) | 11 | 7 | 11 | 8 | 9

Gold medal match: 11 Sep 10:00
Thu Kamkasomphou (FRA) | 11 | 15 | 11
Josefin Abrahamsson (SWE) | 1 | 13 | 5
Bronze medal match: 11 Sep 10:00
Claire Mairie (FRA) | 9 | 2 | 8
Zhang Xiaoling (CHN) | 11 | 11 | 11
