= Swimming at the 2012 Summer Paralympics – Men's 100 metre breaststroke SB9 =

Event at the 2012 Summer Paralympics

Men's 100m Breaststroke SB9 at the XIV Paralympic Games
- Venue: London Aquatics Centre
- Dates: 8 September 2012
- Competitors: 17 from 13 nations
- Winning time: 1:04.02

Medalists
1st place, gold medalist(s)		Pavel Poltavtsev	Russia
2nd place, silver medalist(s)		Kevin Paul	South Africa
3rd place, bronze medalist(s)		Lin Furong	China

The men's 100m breaststroke SB9 event at the 2012 Summer Paralympics took place at the London Aquatics Centre on 8 September. There were three heats; the swimmers with the eight fastest times advanced to the final.

== Results ==
=== Heats ===
Competed from 09:30.

==== Heat 1 ====
Rank	Lane	Name	Nationality	Time	Notes
1	4	Lin Furong	China	1:09.35	Q, AS
2	6	Shahin Izadyar	Iran	1:12.23	Q
3	3	Adriano Nascimento	Portugal	1:12.32	Q
4	2	Cody Bureau	United States	1:17.02	
	5	Nathan Stein	Canada	DNS	

==== Heat 2 ====
Rank	Lane	Name	Nationality	Time	Notes
1	4	Pavel Poltavtsev	Russia	1:08.96	Q
2	3	Jack Bridge	Great Britain	1:10.01	Q
3	5	Denis Dorogaev	Russia	1:10.68	Q
4	6	Tamas Toth	Hungary	1:13.41	
5	2	Isaac Bouckley	Canada	1:15.99	
6	7	Matthew Sultana	Malta	1:36.89	

==== Heat 3 ====
Rank	Lane	Name	Nationality	Time	Notes
1	4	Kevin Paul	South Africa	1:06.21	Q, PR
2	3	Rick Pendleton	Australia	1:11.94	Q
3	5	Iurii Martynov	Ukraine	1:12.43	
4	6	Javier Crespo	Spain	1:13.97	
5	7	Joe Wise	United States	1:16.44	
6	2	Dmitry Grigorev	Russia	1:19.34	

=== Final ===
Competed at 17:30.

Rank	Lane	Name	Nationality	Time	Notes
1st place, gold medalist(s)	5	Pavel Poltavtsev	Russia	1:04.02	WR
2nd place, silver medalist(s)	4	Kevin Paul	South Africa	1:05.70	AF
3rd place, bronze medalist(s)	3	Lin Furong	China	1:07.40	AS
4	6	Jack Bridge	Great Britain	1:10.40	
5	7	Rick Pendleton	Australia	1:10.96	
6	8	Adriano Nascimento	Portugal	1:11.87	
7	2	Denis Dorogaev	Russia	1:12.09	
8	1	Shahin Izadyar	Iran	1:12.47	

'Q = qualified for final. WR = World Record. PR = Paralympic Record. AS = Asian Record. AF = African Record. DNS = Did not start.
