= Mateusz Michalski =

Mateusz Michalski may refer to:

- Mateusz Michalski (athlete), Polish Paralympic athlete
- Mateusz Michalski (swimmer), Polish Paralympic swimmer
- Mateusz Michalski (footballer) (born 29 June 1991), Polish professional footballer
- Mateusz Michalski (ice hockey) (born 29 July 1992), Polish international ice hockey player
