= Equestrian at the 2004 Summer Paralympics – Individual freestyle test grade II =

Paralympic equestrian event

Mixed Dressage - Freestyle grade II at the XII Paralympic Games
- Paralympic Equestrian
- Venue: Markopoulo Olympic Equestrian Centre
- Dates: 24 September 2004
- Competitors: 20 from 12 nations
- Winning points: 78.944

Medalists
1st place, gold medalist(s)		Irene Slaettengren	Sweden
2nd place, silver medalist(s)		Hannelore Brenner	Germany
3rd place, bronze medalist(s)		Nicola Tustain	Great Britain

The Individual freestyle test grade II equestrian event at the 2004 Summer Paralympics was competed on 24 September. It was won by Irene Slaettengren, representing Sweden.

== Final round ==
24 Sept. 2004, 10:00

Rank	Athlete	Points	Notes
1st place, gold medalist(s)	Irene Slaettengren (SWE)	78.944	
2nd place, silver medalist(s)	Hannelore Brenner (GER)	76.056	
3rd place, bronze medalist(s)	Nicola Tustain (GBR)	75.000	
4	Joop Stokkel (NED)	74.333	
5	Gert Bolmer (NED)	73.389	
6	Lauren Barwick (CAN)	73.056	
7	Britta Naepel (GER)	72.167	
8	Kerstin Englund (SWE)	71.389	
9	Angelika Trabert (GER)	71.000	
10	Jo Pitt (GBR)	70.444	
11	Itai Zuck (ISR)	70.333	
12	Malene Sommerlund (DEN)	67.889	
13	Ilya Shulga (RUS)	67.500	
14	Thomas Haller (AUT)	67.333	
15	Liselotte Rosenhart (DEN)	67.111	
16	Dax Adam (CAN)	64.556	
17	Aneta Matysiak (POL)	64.056	
18	Eyal Shahar (ISR)	62.389	
19	Breda Bernie (IRL)	61.833	
20	Wendy Olivier (RSA)	57.278	
