= Shooting at the 2004 Summer Paralympics – Mixed 10 metre air rifle standing SH2 =

Mixed 10m Air Rifle Standing SH2 at the XII Paralympic Games
- Paralympic Shooting
- Venue: Markopoulo Olympic Shooting Centre
- Dates: 22 September 2004
- Competitors: 23 from 15 nations
- Winning points: 704.3

Medalists
1st place, gold medalist(s)		Mike Johnson	New Zealand
2nd place, silver medalist(s)		Thomas Johansson	Sweden
3rd place, bronze medalist(s)		Viktoria Wedin	Sweden

The Mixed 10m Air Rifle Standing SH2 shooting event at the 2004 Summer Paralympics was competed on 22 September. It was won by Mike Johnson, representing New Zealand.

== Preliminary ==
Qualified for next round

22 Sept. 2004, 14:00

Rank	Athlete	Points	Notes
1	Mike Johnson (NZL)	600	WR Q
2	Viktoria Wedin (SWE)	599	Q
2	Damjan Pavlin (SLO)	599	Q
4	Thomas Johansson (SWE)	598	Q
4	Johnny Andersen (DEN)	598	Q
6	Liu Jie (CHN)	598	Q
7	Christiane Latzke (GER)	598	Q
8	Ho Gyoung You (KOR)	597	Q
9	Yukiko Kinoshita (JPN)	594	
10	Wolfgang Stoeckl (GER)	594	
11	Srecko Majcenovic (SLO)	593	
12	Tanguy de la Forest (FRA)	592	
13	Luc Dessart (BEL)	591	
14	Bruce Heidt (CAN)	591	
15	Mike Larochelle (CAN)	591	
16	Panagiotis Giannoukaris (GRE)	590	
17	Kalevi Kaipainen (FIN)	589	
18	Akiko Sakuraoka (JPN)	589	
19	Hans Peter Stamper (BEL)	589	
20	Juan Antonio Saavedra (ESP)	586	
21	Peter Worsley (AUS)	583	
22	Chris Trifonidis (CAN)	580	
23	Hitomi Suzuki (JPN)	575	

== Final round ==
22 Sept. 2004, 17:30

Rank	Athlete	Points	Notes
1st place, gold medalist(s)	Mike Johnson (NZL)	704.3	=WR
2nd place, silver medalist(s)	Thomas Johansson (SWE)	703.4	
3rd place, bronze medalist(s)	Viktoria Wedin (SWE)	702.7	
4	Damjan Pavlin (SLO)	702.1	
5	Johnny Andersen (DEN)	701.8	
6	Christiane Latzke (GER)	701.2	
7	Ho Gyoung You (KOR)	700.4	
8	Liu Jie (CHN)	700.2	
