= Judo at the 2004 Summer Paralympics – Women's +70 kg =

Judo - Women's over 70 kg at the XII Paralympic Games
- Paralympic Judo
- Venue: Ano Liossia Olympic Hall
- Dates: 20 September 2004
- Competitors: 4 from 4 nations

Medalists
1st place, gold medalist(s)		Xue Lan Mei	China
2nd place, silver medalist(s)		Maria Olmedo	Spain
3rd place, bronze medalist(s)		Beate Bischler	Germany
3rd place, bronze medalist(s)		Nina Ivanova	Russia

The Women's over 70 kg judo competition at the 2004 Summer Paralympics was held on 20 September at the Ano Liossia Olympic Hall.

The tournament bracket consisted of a single-elimination contest culminating in a gold medal match and the two losers of the semifinais won automatic the two bronze medals.

The event was won by Xue Lan Mei, representing China.

== Results ==
The four digits represent scores of ippon, waza-ari, yuko and koka (which was still used at the time).

=== Competition bracket ===
Semi-finals
Xue Lan Mei (CHN)	0200
Beate Bischler (GER)	0000
Maria Olmedo (ESP)	0200
Nina Ivanova (RUS)	0000

Final
Xue Lan Mei (CHN)	1000
Maria Olmedo (ESP)	0000
Third place
Beate Bischler (GER)	0210
Nina Ivanova (RUS)	0000
