= Swimming at the 2008 Summer Paralympics – Men's 100 metre backstroke S6 =

Men's 100m Backstroke S6 at the XIII Paralympic Games
- Venue: Beijing National Aquatics Center
- Dates: 9 September
- Competitors: 10 from 9 nations
- Winning time: 1:14.45

Medalists
1st place, gold medalist(s)		Igor Plotnikov	Russia
2nd place, silver medalist(s)		Yang Yuanrun	China
3rd place, bronze medalist(s)		Tang Yuan	China

The men's 100m backstroke S6 event at the 2008 Summer Paralympics took place at the Beijing National Aquatics Center on 9 September. There were two heats; the swimmers with the eight fastest times advanced to the final.

== Results ==
=== Heats ===
Competed from 09:11.

==== Heat 1 ====
Rank	Name	Nationality	Time	Notes
1	Tang Yuan	China	1:20.59	Q
2	Yang Yuanrun	China	1:21.89	Q
3	Diego Pastore	Argentina	1:26.04	Q
4	Naing Sit Aung	Myanmar	1:30.75	
5	Prajim Rieangsantiea	Thailand	1:31.55	

==== Heat 2 ====
Rank	Name	Nationality	Time	Notes
1	Igor Plotnikov	Russia	1:15.58	Q
2	Mateusz Michalski	Poland	1:21.80	Q
3	Swen Michaelis	Germany	1:25.09	Q
4	Iaroslav Semenenko	Ukraine	1:25.55	Q
5	Johnny Cummings	Ireland	1:29.92	Q

=== Final ===
Competed at 17:07.

Rank	Name	Nationality	Time	Notes
1st place, gold medalist(s)	Igor Plotnikov	Russia	1:14.45	
2nd place, silver medalist(s)	Yang Yuanrun	China	1:16.35	
3rd place, bronze medalist(s)	Tang Yuan	China	1:17.05	
4	Mateusz Michalski	Poland	1:21.69	
5	Iaroslav Semenenko	Ukraine	1:23.13	
6	Swen Michaelis	Germany	1:23.83	
7	Diego Pastore	Argentina	1:24.49	
8	Johnny Cummings	Ireland	1:29.26	

Q = qualified for final.
