= Equestrian at the 2004 Summer Paralympics – Individual championship test grade II =

Mixed Dressage - Championship grade II at the XII Paralympic Games
- Paralympic Equestrian
- Venue: Markopoulo Olympic Equestrian Centre
- Dates: 22 September 2004
- Competitors: 20 from 12 nations
- Winning points: 72.636

Medalists
1st place, gold medalist(s)		Irene Slaettengren	Sweden
2nd place, silver medalist(s)		Joop Stokkel	Netherlands
3rd place, bronze medalist(s)		Nicola Tustain	Great Britain
3rd place, bronze medalist(s)		Gert Bolmer	Netherlands

The Individual championship test grade II equestrian event at the 2004 Summer Paralympics was competed on 22 September. It was won by Irene Slaettengren, representing Sweden. Two bronze medals were awarded for tied scores.

== Final round ==
22 Sept. 2004, 10:00

Rank	Athlete	Points	Notes
1st place, gold medalist(s)	Irene Slaettengren (SWE)	72.636	
2nd place, silver medalist(s)	Joop Stokkel (NED)	70.545	
3rd place, bronze medalist(s)	Nicola Tustain (GBR)	68.727	
3rd place, bronze medalist(s)	Gert Bolmer (NED)	68.727	
5	Angelika Trabert (GER)	68.545	
6	Kerstin Englund (SWE)	68.091	
7	Lauren Barwick (CAN)	68.000	
8	Britta Naepel (GER)	67.091	
8	Jo Pitt (GBR)	67.091	
10	Itai Zuck (ISR)	66.000	
11	Liselotte Rosenhart (DEN)	65.273	
12	Malene Sommerlund (DEN)	65.091	
13	Ilya Shulga (RUS)	63.000	
14	Dax Adam (CAN)	60.727	
15	Thomas Haller (AUT)	60.091	
16	Eyal Shahar (ISR)	57.818	
17	Breda Bernie (IRL)	55.000	
18	Aneta Matysiak (POL)	54.636	
19	Wendy Olivier (RSA)	53.727	
	Hannelore Brenner (GER)	DNS	
