= Kevin Paul =

South African Paralympic swimmer

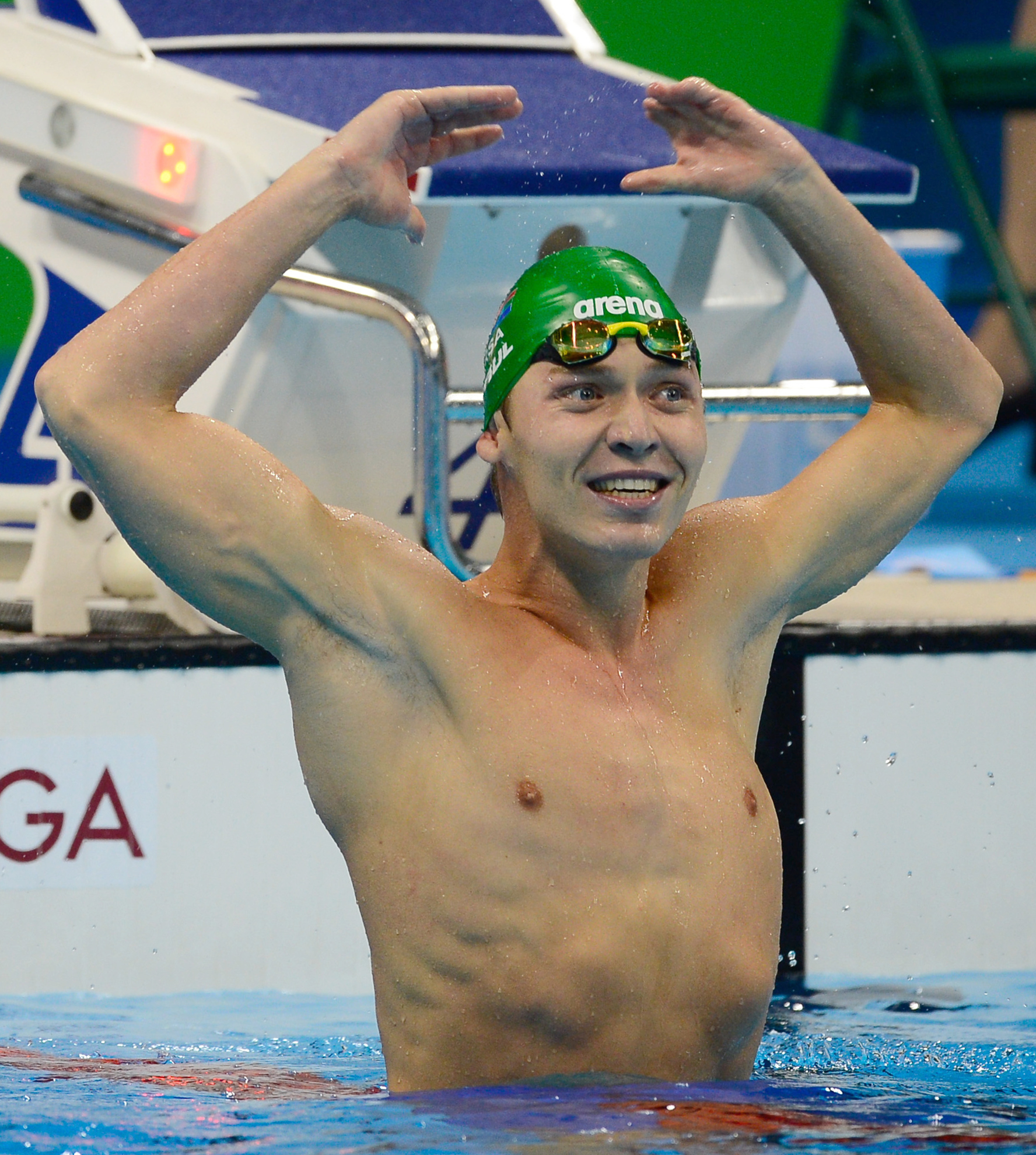
- Paul at the 2016 Paralympics

Personal information
- Nationality: South Africa
- Born: 30 June 1991 (age 35) Gqeberha, South Africa

Sport
- Sport: Swimming
- Strokes: Breaststroke
- Classifications: S10, SB9, SM10
Medal record
Men's paralympic swimming
Representing South Africa
Paralympic Games
Gold medal – first place	2008 Beijing	100m breaststroke SB9
Silver medal – second place	2012 London	100m breaststroke SB9
Gold medal – first place	2016 Rio	100m breaststroke SB9
World Championships
Silver medal – second place	2010 Eindhoven	100m breaststroke SB9
Gold medal – first place	2013 Montreal	100m breaststroke SB9
Gold medal – first place	2015 Glasgow	100 m breaststroke SB9

Kevin Paul (born 30 June, 1991) is a South African Paralympic swimmer. Competing in the SB9-class 100m breaststroke, he won gold medals at the 2008 and 2016 Paralympic Games and a silver medal at the 2012 London Paralympic Games.

Further to setting breaststroke world records, Paul also competed in S10 and SM10 categories of freestyle and the individual medley.

== Early life and education ==
Paul was born in Gqeberha (formerly Port Elizabeth), South Africa. He started swimming at 4 years old. As a teenager, Paul was a head prefect at Grey High School and consistently achieved top academic marks while training. In 2014, Paul moved to Durban, South Africa to further dedicate himself to his training. He went on to pursue a law degree at the Nelson Mandela Metropolitan University during his international swimming career.

== Swimming career ==
Paul qualified for the 2008 Beijing Paralympic Games in the Men's 200m individual medley SM10, the Men's 400m freestyle S10, and the Men's 100m breaststroke S9. In the latter, Paul won the gold by breaking his own world record time with a new Paralympic world record time of 1:08.58. He was 17 years old.

In 2010, Paul continued his momentum as a sprint swimmer by competing in the Swimming World Championships in the Netherlands.

In 2012, Paul competed in the South Africa National Swimming Championships and Paralympic Trials, setting another 100m breaststroke world record time of 1:05.94. Paul went on to swim in freestyle, individual medley, and breaststroke categories at the 2012 London Paralympic Games. Paul earned a silver medal in the Men's 100m breaststroke S9.

A portion of the South African Paralympic Team at the 2016 Rio Paralympic Games Opening Ceremony

In 2015, Paul again competed in the South Africa National Swimming Championships and claimed a World No. 1 ranking, lowering his 200m breaststroke world record to a 2:22.27. In July 2015, Paul competed in the International Paralympic Committee Swimming World Championships.

Kevin Paul celebrating his win at the 2016 Rio Paralympic Games

In the 2016 Rio Paralympic Games, Paul once again reached the finals in the Men's 200m individual medley SM10 and the Men's 100m breaststroke S9. At 25 years old, Paul repeated his 2008 Paralympic gold, winning his signature 100m breaststroke event with a time of 1:04.86. This was South Africa's first gold medal earned at the 2016 Rio Paralympic Games. South Africa's government and President Jacob Zuma recognized Paul for his achievement.

== Personal life ==
Paul was born with Poland Syndrome, with no pectoral major or minor muscles on the left side of his chest. As Paul's left arm was impacted by the condition, he adapted his swimming stroke to engage his shoulder muscles and regularly competed with able-bodied swimmers as a child.

Since his professional swimming success, Paul has gone on to move to Dubai and Jeddah to support youth sports initiatives.
