= Dmitri Poline =

Russian Paralympic swimmer

Medal record

Swimming

Representing Russia

Paralympic Games
Gold medal – first place	2004 Athens	100 metre breaststroke - SB9

Dmitri Poline is a paralympic swimmer from Russia competing mainly in category SB9 events.

Dmitri competed in one event in the 2004 Summer Paralympics in Athens, he won the gold medal in the 100m breaststroke in a world record time of 1:11.13
