= Viktoria Wedin =

Swedish Paralympic sport shooter

Personal information
- Nationality: Swedish

Sport
- Country: Sweden
- Sport: Paralympic shooting
Medal record
Paralympic Games
Bronze medal – third place	2004 Athens	Mixed 10 metre air rifle standing SH2
Bronze medal – third place	2008 Beijing	Mixed 10 metre air rifle prone SH2

Viktoria Wedin is a Swedish Paralympic sport shooter.

Wedin has impaired muscle power and competes in SH2 classification events.

Wedin competed at the Paralympic Games in 1996, 2004, where she won a bronze medal in the Mixed 10 metre air rifle standing SH2 event, and in 2008, where she won a bronze medal in the Mixed 10 metre air rifle prone SH2 event.
