= Beate Bischler =

German Paralympic judoka

Personal information
- Born: 17 June 1968 (age 58) Villingen-Schwenningen, Germany
- Occupation: Judoka

Sport
- Country: Germany
- Sport: Para judo
Medal record
Paralympic judo
Representing Germany
Paralympic Games
Bronze medal – third place	2004 Athens	Women's +70kg

Profile at external databases
- JudoInside.com: 33557

Beate Bischler (born 17 June 1968) is a retired German Paralympic judoka who competed in international level events. She was a bronze medalist at the 2004 Summer Paralympics after defeating Nina Ivanova in the bronze medal match.
