= Iréne Slättengren =

Swedish equestrian

Personal information
- Born: 18 May 1952 (age 74) Linköping, Sweden
- Years active: 1997-c.2008

Sport
- Country: Sweden
- Sport: Para equestrian
- Disability class: Grade II
- Event: Dressage

Achievements and titles
- Paralympic finals: 2004
- World finals: 2007
Medal record
Representing Sweden
Paralympic Games
Gold medal – first place	2004 Athens	Individual championship
Gold medal – first place	2004 Athens	Individual freestyle

Iréne Slättengren (born 18 May 1952) is a Swedish former equestrian and audiologist. She won gold medals in the individual championship test grade II and individual freestyle test grade II dressage events at the 2004 Summer Paralympics in Athens.

== Personal life ==
Slättengren is from Linköping, Sweden. As a youngstar, she contracted polio which caused a spinal cord injury. Aside from equestrianism, Slättengren has worked as an audiologist at Linköping University Hospital.

== Career ==
Slättengren started competing in 1997, and trained at Linköpings RS. At the 2004 Summer Paralympics, Slättengren competed on the horse Larino, as her own horse was injured. She won both the individual championship test grade II and individual freestyle test grade II events. She was the first Paralympic medallist from Linköping, and was aged 52 at the time. Slättengren also had the third best individual performance in the team event, and the Swedish team finished fourth.

Slättengren competed at the 2007 World Para Dressage Championships, and was considered one of the favourites. She failed to qualify for the 2008 Summer Paralympics as her horse Mauritz was injured during the selection trials. Carolin Rutberg was selected instead.
