= David Levecq =

Spanish Paralympic swimmer (born 1984)

Personal information
- Full name: David Julián Levecq Vives
- Nationality: Spain
- Born: 15 August 1984 (age 41) Béziers, France

Sport
- Sport: Swimming
Medal record
Men's swimming
Representing Spain
Paralympic Games
Silver medal – second place	2004 Athens	50m freestyle S10
Silver medal – second place	2004 Athens	100m freestyle S10
Silver medal – second place	2008 Beijing	100m butterfly S10
IPC World Championships
Silver medal – second place	2002 Mar del Plata	100m freestyle S10
Silver medal – second place	2002 Mar del Plata	4x100m medley relay 34pts
Silver medal – second place	2006 Durban	100m butterfly S10
Bronze medal – third place	2002 Mar del Plata	50m freestyle S10
Bronze medal – third place	2006 Durban	50m freestyle S10
Bronze medal – third place	2006 Durban	100m freestyle S10
Bronze medal – third place	2010 Eindhoven	100m butterfly S10
Bronze medal – third place	2013 Montreal	100m butterfly S10
IPC European Championships
Gold medal – first place	2009 Reykjavik	50 m freestyle – S10
Gold medal – first place	2009 Reykjavik	100 m freestyle – S10
Silver medal – second place	2009 Reykjavik	4x100m freestyle relay 34pts
Silver medal – second place	2014 Eindhoven	100m butterfly S10
Silver medal – second place	2016 Funchal	50m freestyle S10
Bronze medal – third place	2014 Eindhoven	4x100m medley 34pts
Bronze medal – third place	2014 Eindhoven	50m freestyle S10
Bronze medal – third place	2014 Eindhoven	100m freestyle S10
Bronze medal – third place	2016 Funchal	100 m butterfly – S10
Mediterranean Games
Silver medal – second place	2018 Tarragona	100 m freestyle S10

David Julián Levecq Vives (born 15 August 1984 in Béziers, France) is a swimmer from Spain.

== Personal ==
Levecq was born 15 August 1984 in Béziers, France. He has a mild physical disability. In 2012, he lived in Sant Cugat del Vallès, Barcelona.

== Swimming ==
Levecq is an S10 classification swimmer. He is affiliated with the Spanish Federation of Sports for the Physically Disabled (FEDDF).

Levecq competed at the 2004 Summer Paralympics, earning a silver in the 50 meter freestyle and the 100 meter freestyle. In 2007, he competed at the IDM German Open. He raced at the 2008 Summer Paralympics, and earned a silver medal in the 100 meter butterfly. In 2010, he competed at the Tenerife International Open. He competed at the 2010 Adapted Swimming World Championship in the Netherlands. Twice during the competition, he set new European records in the 50 meter freestyle event. In advance of the competition, he attended a swimming camp with the national team that was part of the Paralympic High Performance Program (HARP Program). He competed at the 2011 IPC European Swimming Championships in Berlin, Germany, where he earned a gold medal in the 100 meter freestyle. He raced at the 2012 Summer Paralympics. He competed at the 2013 Swimming Championship of Catalonia, hosted by the Sabadell Swimming Club, where he was one of nine Spanish swimmers to set a qualifying time for the World Championships. From the Catalan region of Spain, he was a recipient of a 2012 Plan ADO scholarship. He competed at the 2013 IPC Swimming World Championships.
