= Russia at the 2004 Summer Paralympics =

- IPC code: RUS
- NPC: Russian Paralympic Committee
- Website: www.paralymp.ru (in Russian)

in Athens
- Competitors: 84 in 13 sports
- Medals Ranked 11th: Gold 16 Silver 8 Bronze 17 Total 41

Summer Paralympics appearances (overview)
- 1996; 2000; 2004; 2008; 2012; 2016–2024

Other related appearances
- Soviet Union (1988); Unified Team (1992); RPC (2020)

Russia competed at the 2004 Summer Paralympics in Athens, Greece. The team included 84 athletes—49 men and 35 women. Russian competitors won forty-one medals, sixteen gold, eight silver and seventeen bronze, to finish eleventh in the medal table.

== Medallists ==
| Medal | Name | Sport | Event |
|---|---|---|---|
| Gold | Artem Arefyev | Athletics | Men's 400m T36 |
| Gold | Artem Arefyev | Athletics | Men's 1500m T36 |
| Gold | Ildar Pomykalov | Athletics | Men's marathon T13 |
| Gold | Olga Semenova | Athletics | Women's 100m T13 |
| Gold | Evgenia Trushnikova | Athletics | Women's 200m T37 |
| Gold | Olga Semenova | Athletics | Women's 400m T13 |
| Gold | Elena Pautova | Athletics | Women's 1500m T12 |
| Gold | Madina Kazakova | Judo | Women's 63 kg |
| Gold | Tamara Podpalnaya | Powerlifting | Women's 52 kg |
| Gold | Andrey Lebedinskiy | Shooting | Mixed free pistol SH1 |
| Gold | Andrey Strokin | Swimming | Men's 50m freestyle S13 |
| Gold | Andrey Strokin | Swimming | Men's 100m freestyle S13 |
| Gold | Dmitri Poline | Swimming | Men's 100m breaststroke SB9 |
| Gold | Andrey Strokin | Swimming | Men's 100m breaststroke SB13 |
| Gold | Igor Plotnikov | Swimming | Men's 100m backstroke S6 |
| Gold | Olga Sokolova | Swimming | Women's 200m individual medley SM11 |
| Silver | Vladimir Andryushchenko | Athletics | Men's discus throw F12 |
| Silver | Rima Batalova | Athletics | Women's 800m T12 |
| Silver | Natalia Goudkova | Athletics | Women's javelin throw F42-46 |
| Silver | Oleg Kretsul | Judo | Men's 90 kg |
| Silver | Igor Plotnikov | Swimming | Men's 50m butterfly S6 |
| Silver | Albert Bakaev | Swimming | Men's 50m backstroke S3 |
| Silver | Irina Grazhdanova | Swimming | Women's 50m freestyle S9 |
| Silver | Oxana Guseva | Swimming | Women's 400m freestyle S7 |
| Bronze | Sergey Sevostianov | Athletics | Men's long jump F11 |
| Bronze | Sergey Sevostianov | Athletics | Men's triple jump F11 |
| Bronze | Elena Chistilina | Athletics | Women's 100m T46 |
| Bronze | Elena Chistilina | Athletics | Women's 200m T46 |
| Bronze | Elena Pautova | Athletics | Women's 800m T12 |
| Bronze | Rima Batalova | Athletics | Women's 1500m T12 |
| Bronze | Pavel Borisov; Evgeny Chubko; Marat Fatiakhdinov; Alexander Frolov; Aleksandr Glushonok; Anton Kalachev; Andrey Kuvaev; Andrey Lozhechnikov; Lasha Murvanidze; Ivan Potekhin; Oleg Smirnov; Alexei Tchesmine | Football 7-a-side | Men's team |
| Bronze | Viktoriya Potapova | Judo | Women's 48 kg |
| Bronze | Alexandra Vlasova | Judo | Women's 52 kg |
| Bronze | Ekaterina Buzmakova | Judo | Women's 57 kg |
| Bronze | Tatiana Savostyanova | Judo | Women's 70 kg |
| Bronze | Nina Ivanova | Judo | Women's +70 kg |
| Bronze | Andrey Lebedinskiy | Shooting | Mixed sport pistol SH1 |
| Bronze | Andrey Strokin | Swimming | Men's 100m butterfly S13 |
| Bronze | Denis Dorogaev | Swimming | Men's 100m breaststroke SB9 |
| Bronze | Olga Sokolova | Swimming | Women's 100m breaststroke SB11 |
| Bronze | Olga Sokolova | Swimming | Women's 100m backstroke S11 |
| Bronze | Julija Ovsjannikova | Table tennis | Women's singles class 6-8 |

== Sports ==
=== Athletics ===
==== Men's track ====
| Athlete | Class | Event | Heats | | Semifinal | | Final | |
| Athlete | Class | Event | Result | Rank | Result | Rank | Result | Rank |
|---|---|---|---|---|---|---|---|---|
| Artem Arefyev | T36 | 400m | 56.99 PR | 1 Q | —N/a | | 55.28 WR | 1st place, gold medalist(s) |
| Artem Arefyev | T36 | 1500m | —N/a | | | | 4:37.75 WR | 1st place, gold medalist(s) |
| Sergey Budanov | T12 | 800m | 2:02.55 | 7 | Did not advance | | | |
| Sergey Budanov | T13 | 1500m | 4:16.93 | 18 | Did not advance | | | |
| Andrey Koptev | T12 | 100m | 11.45 | 13 | Did not advance | | | |
| Andrey Koptev | T12 | 200m | 23.12 | 8 q | 23.71 | 12 | Did not advance | |
| Andrey Koptev | T12 | 400m | DNS | | Did not advance | | | |
| Ildar Pomykalov | T13 | Marathon | —N/a | | | | 2:38:45 | 1st place, gold medalist(s) |
| Mikhail Popov | T46 | 100m | 11.57 | 7 q | —N/a | | 11.64 | 6 |
| Mikhail Popov | T46 | 200m | 23.04 | 8 q | —N/a | | 23.73 | 8 |
| Mikhail Popov | T46 | 400m | 53.50 | 7 q | —N/a | | 52.23 | 6 |
| Sergey Shilov | T53 | 100m | 16.67 | 17 | Did not advance | | | |
| Sergey Shilov | T53 | 200m | 27.61 | 10 | Did not advance | | | |
| Sergey Shilov | T53 | 800m | 1:41.73 | 7 q | —N/a | | 1:40.41 | 7 |
| Valeriy Stephanskoy | T38 | 400m | 53.45 | 5 Q | —N/a | | 53.19 | 5 |
| Valeriy Stephanskoy | T38 | 800m | —N/a | | | | 2:04.43 | 4 |
| Mikhail Terentiev | T53 | 200m | 28.70 | 16 | Did not advance | | | |

==== Men's field ====
| Athlete | Class | Event | Final | | |
| Athlete | Class | Event | Result | Points | Rank |
|---|---|---|---|---|---|
| Vladimir Andryushchenko | F12 | Discus | 44.49 | - | 2nd place, silver medalist(s) |
| Vladimir Andryushchenko | F12 | Javelin | 41.32 | - | 12 |
| Vladimir Andryushchenko | F13 | Shot put | 14.00 | - | 8 |
| Evgeny Gudkov | F44/46 | Discus | 42.18 | 843 | 5 |
| Evgeny Gudkov | F44/46 | Javelin | 53.34 | 992 | 4 |
| Alexei Ivanov | F56 | Shot put | 10.05 | - | 9 |
| Alexei Ivanov | P54-58 | Pentathlon | 5306 | | 5 |
| Sergey Sevostianov | F11 | Long jump | 6.10 | - | 3rd place, bronze medalist(s) |
| Sergey Sevostianov | F11 | Triple jump | 12.63 | - | 3rd place, bronze medalist(s) |

==== Women's track ====
| Athlete | Class | Event | Heats | | Semifinal | | Final | |
| Athlete | Class | Event | Result | Rank | Result | Rank | Result | Rank |
|---|---|---|---|---|---|---|---|---|
| Rima Batalova | T12 | 800m | 2:22.86 | 5 q | —N/a | | 2:16.56 | 2nd place, silver medalist(s) |
| Rima Batalova | T12 | 1500m | —N/a | | | | 4:42.61 | 3rd place, bronze medalist(s) |
| Elena Chistilina | T46 | 100m | 12.87 | 4 Q | —N/a | | 12.76 | 3rd place, bronze medalist(s) |
| Elena Chistilina | T46 | 200m | 26.50 | 3 Q | —N/a | | 25.93 | 3rd place, bronze medalist(s) |
| Elena Chistilina | T46 | 400m | 1:02.49 | 4 Q | —N/a | | 1:56.61 | 8 |
| Irina Dezhurova | T53 | 800m | 2:15.86 | 8 q | —N/a | | 2:17.98 | 8 |
| Irina Dezhurova | T54 | Marathon | —N/a | | | | 2:09:36 | 12 |
| Elena Frolova | T11 | 100m | 12.80 | 2 Q | DSQ | | Did not advance | |
| Elena Frolova | T11 | 200m | 31.07 | 9 | Did not advance | | | |
| Elena Jdanova | T12 | 100m | 13.11 | 4 Q | 13.12 | 4 Q | 13.01 | 4 |
| Elena Jdanova | T12 | 200m | 28.72 | 8 Q | 26.12 | 4 q | 26.82 | 4 |
| Elena Jdanova | T12 | 400m | 1:00.27 | 4 q | 58.88 | 5 B | 1:01.24 | 5 |
| Alexandra Moguchaya | T46 | 200m | 27.99 | 8 q | —N/a | | 28.41 | 8 |
| Alexandra Moguchaya | T46 | 400m | 1:04.14 | 6 Q | —N/a | | 1:02.74 | 5 |
| Elena Pautova | T12 | 800m | 2:18.36 | 2 q | —N/a | | 2:16.86 | 3rd place, bronze medalist(s) |
| Elena Pautova | T12 | 1500m | —N/a | | | | 4:36.29 WR | 1st place, gold medalist(s) |
| Olga Semenova | T13 | 100m | —N/a | | | | 12.56 | 1st place, gold medalist(s) |
| Olga Semenova | T13 | 400m | —N/a | | | | 57.79 | 1st place, gold medalist(s) |
| Victoria Tchernova | T12 | 800m | 2:36.60 | 9 | Did not advance | | | |
| Victoria Tchernova | T12 | 1500m | —N/a | | | | 5:13.71 | 6 |
| Evgenia Trushnikova | T37 | 100m | —N/a | | | | 14.96 | 4 |
| Evgenia Trushnikova | T37 | 200m | —N/a | | | | 30.14 | 1st place, gold medalist(s) |
| Evgenia Trushnikova | T38 | 400m | —N/a | | | | 1:07.99 | 4 |

==== Women's field ====
| Athlete | Class | Event | Final | | |
| Athlete | Class | Event | Result | Points | Rank |
|---|---|---|---|---|---|
| Natalia Goudkova | F42-46 | Discus | NMR | | |
| Natalia Goudkova | F42-46 | Javelin | 37.58 WR | 1012 | 2nd place, silver medalist(s) |
| Tatiana Mezinova | F42-46 | Discus | 23.01 | 711 | 15 |
| Tatiana Mezinova | F42-46 | Javelin | 28.82 | 776 | 8 |

=== Equestrian ===
| Athlete | Event | Total | |
| Athlete | Event | Score | Rank |
|---|---|---|---|
| Ilya Shulga | Mixed individual championship test grade II | 63.000 | 13 |
| Ilya Shulga | Mixed individual freestyle test grade II | 67.500 | 13 |
| Natalya Zhavoronkova | Mixed individual championship test grade IV | 62.000 | 12 |
| Natalya Zhavoronkova | Mixed individual freestyle test grade IV | 66.545 | 13 |

=== Football 7-a-side ===
The men's football 7-a-side team won a bronze medal after defeating Argentina.

==== Players ====
- Pavel Borisov
- Evgeny Chubko
- Marat Fatiakhdinov
- Alexander Frolov
- Aleksandr Glushonok
- Anton Kalachev
- Andrey Kuvaev
- Andrey Lozhechnikov
- Lasha Murvanidze
- Ivan Potekhin
- Oleg Smirnov
- Alexei Tchesmine

==== Tournament ====
| Game | Match | Score | Rank |
| 1 | Russia vs. Brazil (BRA) | 1 - 2 | 2 Q |
| 2 | Russia vs. Netherlands (NED) | 7 - 1 | 2 Q |
| 3 | Russia vs. United States (USA) | 3 - 0 | 2 Q |
| Semifinals | Russia vs. Ukraine (UKR) | 1 - 4 | L |
| Bronze medal final | Russia vs. Argentina (ARG) | 5 - 0 | 3rd place, bronze medalist(s) |

=== Judo ===
==== Men ====
| Athlete | Event | Preliminary | Quarterfinals | Semifinals | Repechage round 1 | Repechage round 2 | Final/ Bronze medal contest |
| Athlete | Event | Opposition Result | Opposition Result | Opposition Result | Opposition Result | Opposition Result | Opposition Result |
|---|---|---|---|---|---|---|---|
| Osman Akaev | Men's +100kg | Bye | Amakawa (JPN); W 0002S-0001S | Rose (GBR); L 0001K-0201S | —N/a | | Torres Pompa (CUB); L 0000-1000 |
| Ravkhat Atnabaev | Men's 73kg | Wang Y F (CHN); L 0000-1000 | —N/a | | A M Gonzalez (CUB); W 1000-0000 | Asakereh (IRI); L 0000-1000 | Did not advance |
| Oleg Kretsul | Men's 90kg | Bye | Clarke (AUS); W 1000-0000 | Park J M (KOR); W 1010-0000 | —N/a | | Nine (ALG); L 0001-0120S (silver) |
| Veniamin Michurin | Men's 60kg | Zasyadkovych (UKR); L 0000–0021 | Did not advance | | | | |
| Grigory Shneyderman | Men's 100kg | Bye | Dahmen (GER); L 0000-1000 | —N/a | Montero (VEN); W 1000-0000 | Hokmabad (IRI); W 0201S-0001S | Szott (USA); L 0000-0001 |
| Anatoly Vlasov | Men's 81kg | Morgan (CAN); W 1000-0000 | S Gonzalez (ESP); W 0001-0000S | Jonard (FRA); L 0000-0200 | —N/a | | Junk (GER); L 1000-0000 |

==== Women ====
| Athlete | Event | Quarterfinals | Semifinals | Repechage | Final/ Bronze medal contest |
| Athlete | Event | Opposition Result | Opposition Result | Opposition Result | Opposition Result |
|---|---|---|---|---|---|
| Ekaterina Buzmakova | Women's 57kg | Lei L P (CHN); L 0000-0200 | —N/a | | Keramida (GRE); W 1000-0000 (bronze) |
| Nina Ivanova | Women's +70kg | —N/a | Olmedo (ESP); L 0000-0200 | —N/a | Bischler (GER); L 0000-0210 |
| Madina Kazakova | Women's 63kg | Quessandier (FRA); W 1001S-0001S | Zhang Q H (CHN); W 1000-0000 | —N/a | Huettler (GER); W 1000-0000 (gold) |
| Viktoriya Potapova | Women's 48kg | Guo H P (CHN); W 1000-0000 | Medjeded (FRA); L 0010–1000 | —N/a | Akatsuka (JPN); W 1010-0000 (bronze) |
| Tatiana Savostyanova | Women's 70kg | Bye | Herrera (ESP); L 0010-1030 | —N/a | Trachu (THA); W 1000-0000 (bronze) |
| Alexandra Vlasova | Women's 52kg | Bye | Aurières (FRA); L 0000-1010 | —N/a | Allan (AUS); W 1000-0000 (bronze) |

=== Powerlifting ===
==== Men ====
| Athlete | Event | Result | Rank |
|---|---|---|---|
| Andrey Podpalnyy | 56kg | 132.5 | 9 |
| Sergey Istomin | 100kg | 190.0 | 8 |
| Vadim Rakitin | 75kg | 180.0 | 9 |

==== Women ====
| Athlete | Event | Result | Rank |
|---|---|---|---|
| Marina Dyakonova | +82.5kg | 107.5 | 8 |
| Olga Kisseleva | 75kg | 100.0 | 5 |
| Tamara Podpalnaya | 52kg | 127.5 | 1st place, gold medalist(s) |
| Olga Serguienko | 67.5kg | 90.0 | 4 |

=== Shooting ===
==== Men ====
| Athlete | Event | Qualification | | Final | | |
| Athlete | Event | Score | Rank | Score | Total | Rank |
|---|---|---|---|---|---|---|
| Victor Firsov | Men's 50m rifle 3x40 positions SH1 | 1055 | 23 | Did not advance | | |
| Victor Firsov | Mixed 50m rifle prone SH1 | 578 | 22 | Did not advance | | |
| Andrey Lebedinsky | Men's 10m air pistol SH1 | 554 | 14 | Did not advance | | |
| Andrey Lebedinsky | Mixed 25m pistol SH1 | 567 | 3 Q | 99.6 | 666.6 | 3rd place, bronze medalist(s) |
| Andrey Lebedinsky | Mixed 50m pistol SH1 | 533 | 2 Q | 88.7 | 621.7 WR | 1st place, gold medalist(s) |
| Lev Makarov | Mixed 50m rifle prone SH1 | 570 | 31 | Did not advance | | |
| Victor Stepanov | Men's 10m air pistol SH1 | 553 | 20 | Did not advance | | |
| Victor Stepanov | Mixed 25m pistol SH1 | 539 | 18 | Did not advance | | |
| Victor Stepanov | Mixed 50m pistol SH1 | 496 | 23 | Did not advance | | |

==== Women ====
| Athlete | Event | Qualification | | Final | | |
| Athlete | Event | Score | Rank | Score | Total | Rank |
|---|---|---|---|---|---|---|
| Tatiana Biryukova | Women's 10m air pistol | 360 | 8 Q | 90.7 | 450.7 | 7 |
| Anastasia Panteleeva | Women's 10m air pistol | 363 | 4 Q | 93.6 | 456.6 | 4 |

=== Swimming ===
==== Men ====
| Athlete | Class | Event | Heats | | Final | |
| Athlete | Class | Event | Result | Rank | Result | Rank |
|---|---|---|---|---|---|---|
| Albert Bakaev | S3 | 50m freestyle | 54.15 | 5 Q | 54.02 | 4 |
| Albert Bakaev | S3 | 100m freestyle | 1:58.84 | 4 Q | 1:57.85 | 6 |
| Albert Bakaev | S3 | 50m backstroke | 55.83 | 1 Q | 53.98 | 2nd place, silver medalist(s) |
| Denis Dorogaev | SB9 | 100m breaststroke | 1:13.57 | 3 Q | 1:11.91 | 3rd place, bronze medalist(s) |
| Igor Lukin | S7 | 50m freestyle | 30.74 | 7 Q | 30.96 | 7 |
| Igor Lukin | S7 | 100m freestyle | 1:08.86 | 8 Q | 1:07.64 | 7 |
| Igor Lukin | SM7 | 200m individual medley | 3:06.53 | 11 | Did not advance | |
| Igor Plotnikov | S6 | 50m freestyle | 33.47 | 7 Q | 34.49 | 8 |
| Igor Plotnikov | S6 | 100m backstroke | 1:14.71 WR | 1 Q | 1:13.99 WR | 1st place, gold medalist(s) |
| Igor Plotnikov | S6 | 50m butterfly | 32.51 WR | 1 Q | 33.07 | 2nd place, silver medalist(s) |
| Dmitri Poline | SB9 | 100m breaststroke | 1:13.30 | 2 Q | 1:11.13 WR | 1st place, gold medalist(s) |
| Alexandre Shchelotchkov | S10 | 50m freestyle | 26.23 | 5 Q | 25.83 | 4 |
| Alexandre Shchelotchkov | S10 | 100m freestyle | 58.76 | 13 | Did not advance | |
| Kirill Sokolov | SB6 | 100m breaststroke | N/A | | 1:35.12 | 4 |
| Kirill Sokolov | SM7 | 200m individual medley | 3:08.14 | 14 | Did not advance | |
| Andrey Strokin | S13 | 50m freestyle | 26.28 | 4 Q | 24.88 | 1st place, gold medalist(s) |
| Andrey Strokin | S13 | 100m freestyle | 57.54 | 2 Q | 55.27 PR | 1st place, gold medalist(s) |
| Andrey Strokin | S13 | 100m butterfly | 1:03.97 | 4 Q | 1:02.82 | 3rd place, bronze medalist(s) |
| Andrey Strokin | SB13 | 100m breaststroke | 1:17.65 | 5 Q | 1:12.09 | 1st place, gold medalist(s) |

==== Women ====
| Athlete | Class | Event | Heats | | Final | |
| Athlete | Class | Event | Result | Rank | Result | Rank |
|---|---|---|---|---|---|---|
| Anastasia Diodorova | S6 | 100m backstroke | 1:39.68 | 5 Q | 1:37.06 | 4 |
| Anastasia Diodorova | S6 | 50m butterfly | 42.81 | 4 Q | 42.62 | 4 |
| Irina Grazhdanova | S9 | 50m freestyle | 31.14 | 2 Q | 30.63 | 2nd place, silver medalist(s) |
| Irina Grazhdanova | S9 | 100m freestyle | 1:09.26 | 5 Q | 1:09.23 | 7 |
| Irina Grazhdanova | S9 | 100m butterfly | 1:23.19 | 14 | Did not advance | |
| Irina Grazhdanova | SM9 | 200m individual medley | 2:56.00 | 9 | Did not advance | |
| Oxana Guseva | S7 | 50m freestyle | 37.97 | 10 | Did not advance | |
| Oxana Guseva | S7 | 100m freestyle | 1:18.41 | 4 Q | 1:17.68 | 6 |
| Oxana Guseva | S7 | 400m freestyle | 5:40.26 | 3 Q | 5:32.10 | 2nd place, silver medalist(s) |
| Oxana Guseva | S7 | 50m butterfly | 43.42 | 8 Q | 41.61 | 8 |
| Oxana Guseva | SM7 | 200m individual medley | 3:22.64 | 4 Q | 3:19.32 | 4 |
| Yulia Nikitina | SB9 | 100m breaststroke | 1:27.76 | 4 Q | 1:28.74 | 6 |
| Tatiana Outekina | S9 | 100m backstroke | 1:19.34 | 6 Q | 1:19.55 | 6 |
| Tatiana Outekina | S9 | 100m butterfly | 1:25.20 | 17 | Did not advance | |
| Tatiana Outekina | SM9 | 200m individual medley | 2:59.17 | 11 | Did not advance | |
| Natalia Popova | S4 | 50m freestyle | 1:00.70 | 9 | Did not advance | |
| Natalia Popova | S4 | 50m backstroke | 59.35 | 4 Q | 57.18 | 4 |
| Natalia Popova | SB3 | 50m breaststroke | 1:15.68 | 7 Q | 1:14.07 | 6 |
| Natalia Popova | SM4 | 150m individual medley | 3:39.67 | 6 Q | 3:42.84 | 8 |
| Olga Sokolova | S11 | 50m freestyle | 34.91 | 5 Q | 34.72 | 7 |
| Olga Sokolova | S11 | 100m backstroke | 1:25.45 | 2 Q | 1:23.68 | 3rd place, bronze medalist(s) |
| Olga Sokolova | SB11 | 100m breaststroke | 1:38.09 | 3 Q | 1:38.23 | 3rd place, bronze medalist(s) |
| Olga Sokolova | SM11 | 200m individual medley | N/A | | 3:04.24 | 1st place, gold medalist(s) |
| Irina Grazhdanova; Oxana Guseva; Yulia Nikitina; Tatiana Outekina | N/A | 4 × 100 m medley relay (34pts) | N/A | | 5:25.14 | 4 |

=== Table tennis ===
==== Men ====
| Athlete | Event | Preliminaries | | | | Quarterfinals | Semifinals | Final / BM | |
| Athlete | Event | Opposition Result | Opposition Result | Opposition Result | Rank | Opposition Result | Opposition Result | Opposition Result | Rank |
|---|---|---|---|---|---|---|---|---|---|
| Vadim Buzin | Men's singles 6 | Rosemeier (DEN); L 1–3 | du Plooy (RSA); W 3–0 | Ono (JPN); W 3–0 | 2 Q | Arnold (GER); L 0–3 | Did not advance | | |

==== Women ====
| Athlete | Event | Preliminaries | | | | Quarterfinals | Semifinals | Final / BM | |
| Athlete | Event | Opposition Result | Opposition Result | Opposition Result | Rank | Opposition Result | Opposition Result | Opposition Result | Rank |
|---|---|---|---|---|---|---|---|---|---|
| Olga Komleva | Women's singles 9 | Lei L (CHN); L 1-3 | Kavas (TUR); W 3-2 | Mairie (FRA); W 3-0 | 2 Q | —N/a | Liu M L (CHN); L 0-3 | Kamkasomphou (FRA); L 2-3 | 4 |
| Julija Ovsjannikova | Women's singles 6-8 | Bengtsson Kovacs (SWE); L 0–3 | Darvan (FRA); W 3–0 | Munoz (ARG); W 3–0 | 2 Q | Janeckova (CZE); W 3–1 | Zhang X (CHN); L 0-3 | Turowska (POL); W 3-1 | 3rd place, bronze medalist(s) |
| Raisa Tchebanika | Women's singles 6-8 | Turowska (POL); L 0-3 | Janeckova (CZE); L 2-3 | —N/a | 3 | Did not advance | | | |

=== Wheelchair tennis ===
| Athlete | Class | Event | Round of 64 | Round of 32 | Round of 16 | Quarterfinals | Semifinals | Finals |
| Athlete | Class | Event | Opposition Result | Opposition Result | Opposition Result | Opposition Result | Opposition Result | Opposition Result |
|---|---|---|---|---|---|---|---|---|
| Leonid Shevchick | Open | Men's singles | Sugiharto (INA); W 6–2, 6–1 | Majdi (FRA); L 6–4, 1–6, 1-6 | Did not advance | | | |

== See also ==
- Russia at the Paralympics
- Russia at the 2004 Summer Olympics
