= Jo Pitt =

Scottish equestrian Paralympian

Personal information
- Born: 22 February 1979 Huntly, Aberdeenshire, Great Britain
- Died: 2 May 2013 (aged 34) Dereham, Norfolk, Great Britain

Sport
- Sport: Para equestrian

Jo Pitt (22 February 1979 – 2 May 2013) was a Scottish equestrian Paralympian.

== Early life ==
Pitt came from Huntly, Aberdeenshire, and studied at Oatridge College, West Lothian. She had right-sided hemiplegic cerebral palsy.

== Career ==
Pitt represented Great Britain at the 2004 Athens Paralympics. She won British Dressage's winter championship title in April 2013. She was in the para-equestrian dressage team that won gold at the 2010 World Equestrian Games.

== Death ==
Pitt died 2 May 2013. She had been living with pulmonary veno-occlusive disease. She had recently moved to Dereham, Norfolk to live with her fiancé, Rory.
