= Denis Dorogaev =

Russian Paralympic swimmer

Medal record

Swimming

Representing Russia

Paralympic Games
Silver medal – second place	2012 London	4 x 100 metre medley relay 34pts
Bronze medal – third place	2004 Athens	100 metre breaststroke - SB9
Bronze medal – third place	2008 Beijing	100 metre breaststroke - SB9

IPC European Championships
Silver medal – second place	2009 Reykjavik	100m breaststroke - SB9

Denis Dorogaev is a Paralympic swimmer from Russia competing mainly in category SB9 events.

Denis competed in both the 2004 and 2008 Summer Paralympics. On both occasions he won a bronze medal in the 100m breaststroke for SB9 swimmers, he also swam as part of the Russian 4x100 medley team in the 2004 games where they finished sixth.
