= Igor Plotnikov =

Russian Paralympic swimmer

Personal information
- National team: Russia
- Born: October 7, 1982 (age 43) Megion, Russia

Sport
- Sport: Swimming
- Strokes: Backstroke, Butterfly, Freestyle
- Classifications: S6
Medal record
Swimming
Representing Russia
Paralympic Games
| Gold medal – first place | 2004 Athens | 100 metre backstroke - S6 |
| Gold medal – first place | 2008 Beijing | 100 metre backstroke - S6 |
| Silver medal – second place | 2004 Athens | 50 metre butterfly - S6 |
IPC European Championships
| Silver medal – second place | 2009 Reykjavik | 100 m backstroke – S6 |
| Bronze medal – third place | 2009 Reykjavik | 50 m butterfly – S6 |

Igor Plotnikov is a paralympic swimmer from Russia competing mainly in category S6 events.

== Career ==
Igor travelled with the Russian Paralympic swimming team to two Paralympics games, first in 2004 and then in 2008. At the 2004 games he competed in the 50m freestyle finishing eighth in the final, won silver in the 50m Butterfly despite being the fastest in the heats with a new world record and broke the world record in the heats and final on his way to winning gold in the 100m backstroke. At the 2008 games he was part of the Russian team that finished sixth in the 4 × 100 m medley, he also finished in the same position in the 50m butterfly, failed to make the final of the 400m freestyle but did defend his title in the 100m backstroke
