= Alastair Smales =

Personal information
- Born: 8 May 1962 (age 64) Redcliffe, Queensland, Australia

Sport
- Country: Australia
- Sport: Paralympic swimming
- Disability class: S6
Medal record
Paralympic swimming
Representing Australia
World Championships
Silver medal – second place	2002 Mar del Plata	50m butterfly S6

Alastair Smales (born 8 May 1962) is an Australian Paralympian who competed in swimming. He lost the use of his legs in 1992 becoming a paraplegic after a four-wheel drive he was fixing slipped off a jack and fell on him. Due to this injury, Smales is now classified a S6 wheelchair grade in swimming competitions.

Smales has represented Australia in three consecutive Paralympics in swimming, held a world record at the IPC Swimming World Championships Mar de Plata in 2002 and ranked 1 in his classification. Smales swimming career started in 1996 and ended in 2004 due to his age and inability to keep up with the other swimmers. He was a member of the Sporting Wheelies and Disabled Association and trained at the Redcliffe Leagues Lawnton Club.

After retiring from swimming, Smales pursued a career in air traffic control.

== Personal life ==
Alastair Smales was born in Australia on 8 May 1962. He currently lives in Redcliffe, Queensland with his wife Wanda, and works as an air traffic controller. They have two children.

Smales started his swimming career when he was at the age of 42, which is more than twice the average age of the rest of the Australian swimming team. Since competing at the Atlanta and Sydney Paralympics Smales has ranked number one in the world and has also held a 50m butterfly world record. Despite Smales’ age he was able to make an impact on Paralympic swimming and hopefully influencing other aspiring athletes.

Smales ended up retiring from swimming after eight years due to his inability to handle travelling overseas. He would spend months in hospital after travelling overseas and decided for his health it would be best to retire. Also, due to his age Smales wouldn't have been able to keep up for much longer compared to the younger athletes he was competing with, "It gets harder and harder as you get older," (Age No Barrier in Pool Quest, 2004).

Smales was a role model to the rest of the swimming team and helped the younger swimmers deal with the excitement and stress of their first games.

== Disability ==
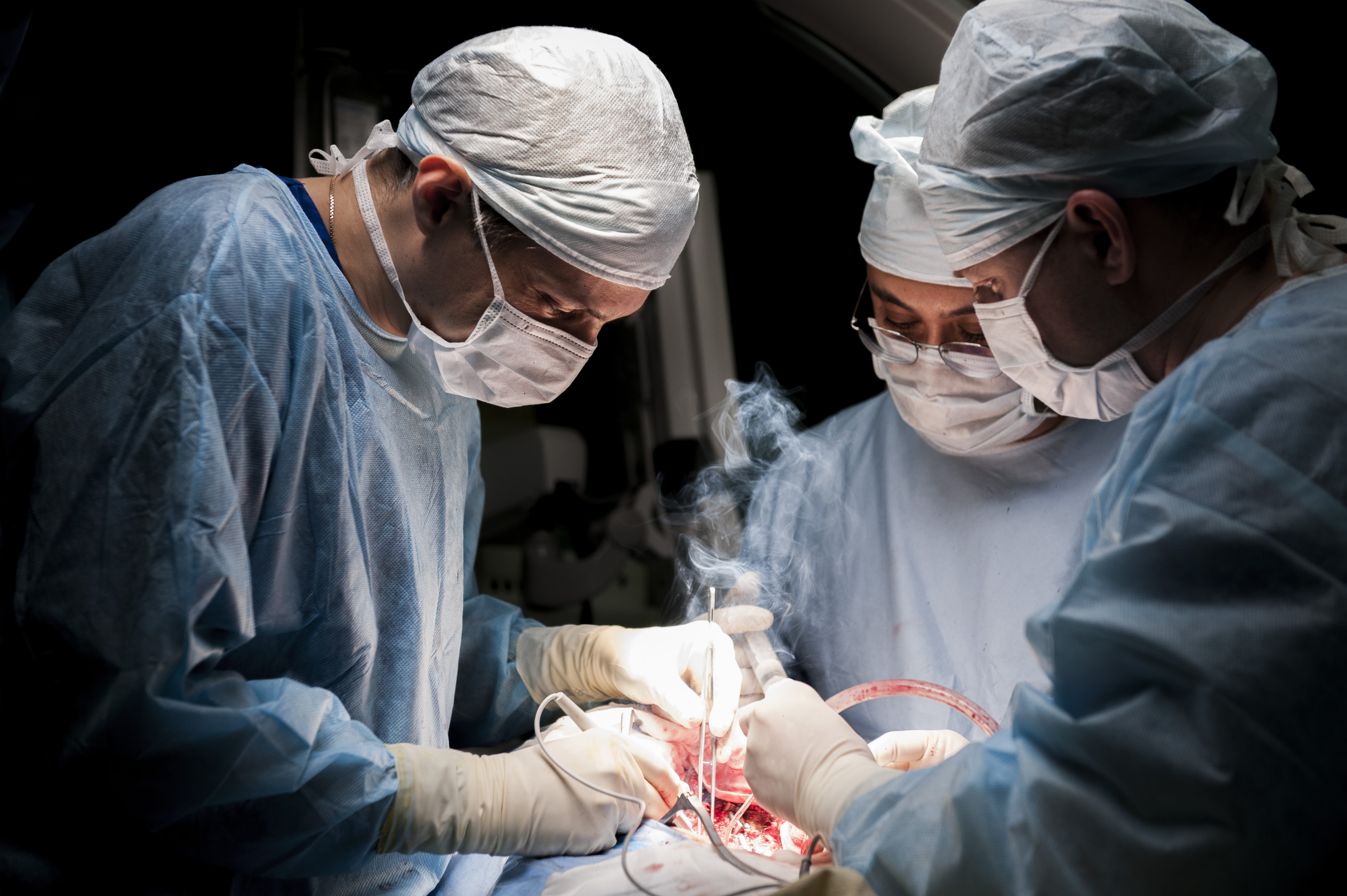
The joint operation of neurosurgeons and traumatologists of the Sklifosovsky Research Institute For Emergency Medicine on the reconstruction of the thoracic and lumbar spine.

Alastair Smales’ injury resulted in him being paraplegic which is when either both legs or hips and organs are paralysed. It is the “impairment or loss of motor and/or sensory function in the thoracic lumbar or sacral segments of the spinal cord, secondary to damage to neural elements within the spinal canal” (Nas, 2015). This is a possible result of damage to the spinal cord when the four-wheel drive fell onto Smales. Spinal cord damage is the most common cause of paraplegia and has no cure, but the individual may recover partial muscle control.

Complete paraglegia is when the individual has no feeling or function in their legs. Resulting in the inability to use both legs and sometimes may experience other issues like loss of bladder/bowel control. These symptoms are common with spinal cord injuries in the thoracic and lumbar regions of the spine, which is the same as Smales’ injury.

Even with this disability Smales decided to pursue a career in swimming. Smales swims in the s6 (wheelchair) grade in competition. This grade includes “swimmers with short stature or amputation of both arms, or moderate co-ordination problems on one side of their body” (“World Para Swimming Classification & Categories - SB9, SM8,” 2020).

== Swimming ==
Smales started his swimming career in 1996 and ended it in 2004. During these years, he competed disability swimming became more mainstream which resulted in more opportunities for disabled people to participate in competitive swimming in Australia. Policies led to Australian society to become more accepting and inclusive during this time.

Paralympic swimming races are organised according to a functional classification system. A class system is used to help determine paralympic swimmer's categorisation based on their scores on muscle testing, range of motion tests, co-ordination and/or level of amputation. This ensures that all swimmers are equal when racing and that winning is determined by sporting factors such as “skill, fitness, power, endurance, tactical ability and mental focus” (World Para Swimming Classification & Categories - SB9, SM8, 2020). Minimising the impact an athlete's impairment has on their performance so their sporting excellence is what determines the athlete's or team's victory.

=== Races ===
According to the International Paralympic Committee these are the games/championships that Alastair Smales swam during his Paralympic swimming career.

==== Atlanta Paralympic Games ====
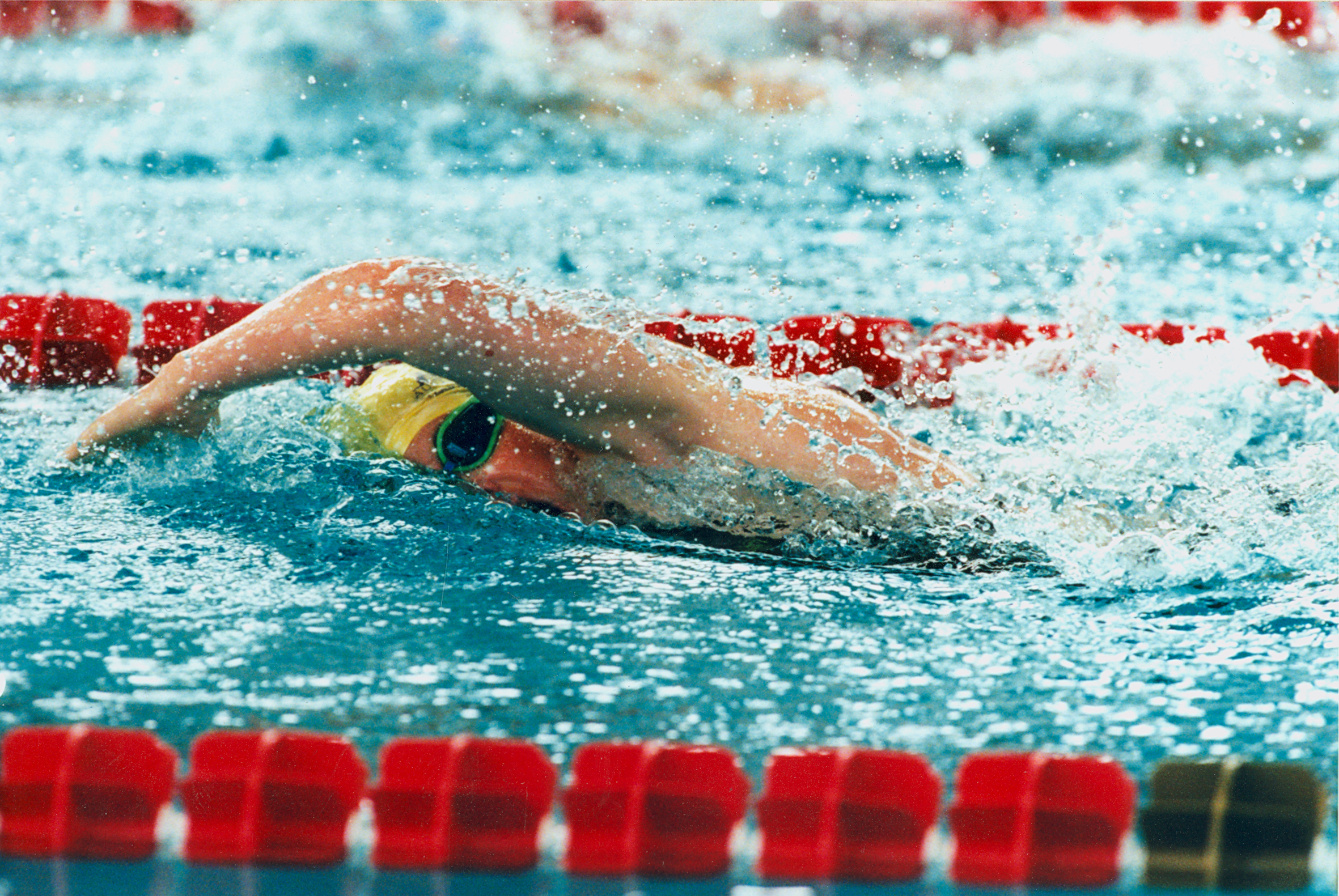
Australian athletes at the Atlanta 1996 Paralympic Games.

The Atlanta Paralympics was held in Georgia, United States from 16 to 25 August. The host USA won the most medals with 46 gold medals and Australia came second with a total of 42 gold medals. The Atlanta games showcased 19 different sporting events, one of them being paralympic swimming.

Smales’ first games was the Atlanta 1996 Paralympic games.

Name	Swimming Stroke	Place	Time
Alastair Smales	50m Butterfly	12th - Heat	0:45:74
Duane Kale	50m Butterfly	1st - Final Round	0:34:37

==== Sydney Paralympic Games ====
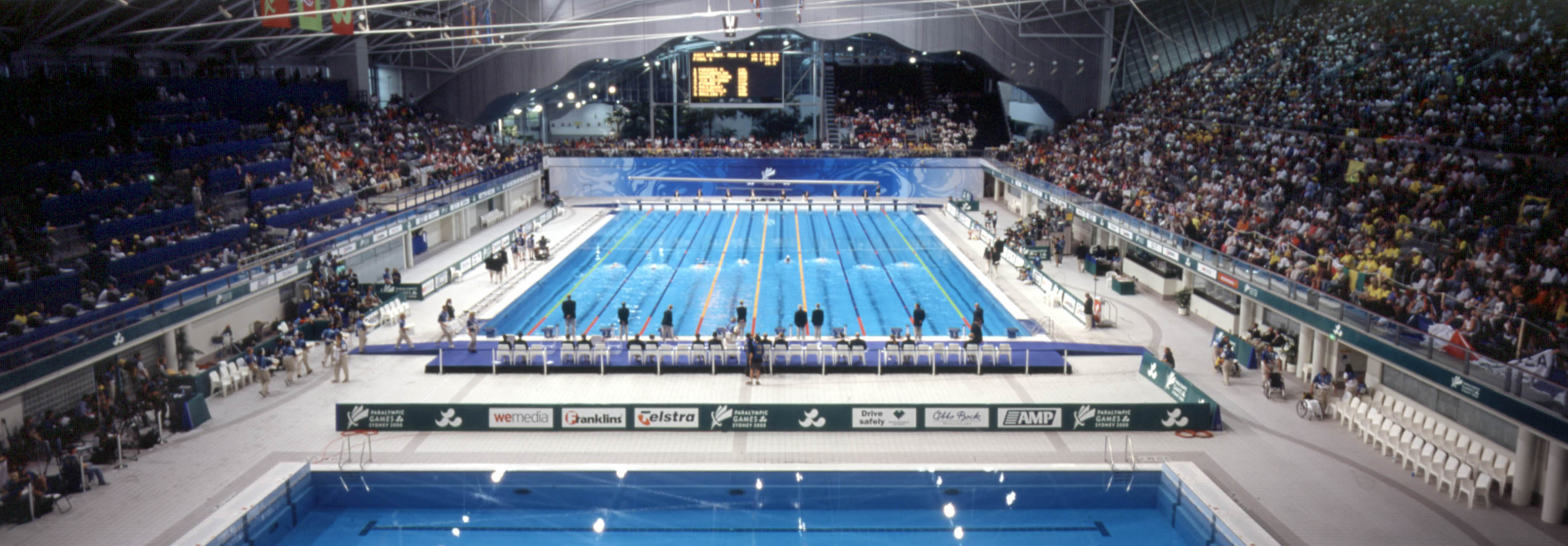
Panoramic view of the Aquatic Centre, Sydney Olympic Park: the venue for swimming competition at the 2000 Sydney Paralympics Games.

The Sydney Paralympics was held in Australia from 18 to 29 October. This Paralympics game was held in an era when the Paralympics movement was growing and more visible so it was more mainstreamed and popular. There was 3,879 Paralympians from 123 different countries. The Sydney games showcased 18 different sporting events, one less than the previous Paralympic games. “Australia dominated the Sydney Paralympics, winning most golds (63) and overall medals (149)” (Phillips & Naar, 2020). The Sydney Paralympic Organising Committee (SPOC) decided to use the same venues as the Olympic Games which led to a more seamless Paralympic event that had the same quality of presentation as the Olympics. The organisers also introduced a $15 day pass to attract big crowds to the Paralympic events which resulted in 1.16 million spectators. To increase awareness and support for the games SPOC also implemented a Paralympic national education program and delivered it to schools around Australia. “This increased awareness about the Paralympics in schools resulted in 340, 000 school kids from every state and territory” (Phillips & Naar, 2020). This year, Smales swam in three different races.

Name	Swimming Stroke	Place	Time
Alastair Smales	50m Butterfly	2nd - Heat	0:35:14
Alastair Smales	50m Butterfly	5th - Final Round	0:35:03
Daniel Vidal	50m Butterfly	1st - Final Round	0:34:01
Alastair Smales	50m Freestyle	6th - Heat	0:45:74
Jianhua Yin	50m Freestyle	1st - Final Round	0:31:31
Alastair Smales	100m Freestyle	7th - Heat	1:27:85
Jianhua Yin	100m Freestyle	1st - Final Round	1:08:10

==== IPC Swimming World Championships Mar de Plata ====
The flag of the International Paralympic Committee from 2004 to 2008.

The IPC Swimming Championships was held from 3 to 12 December. This championship is believed to have marginalised the disabled by not abiding by the classification systems developed by the International Organisations of Sport for the Disabled. The IPCs though were the first international partner of the local Paralympic Games in 1992. Resulting in IPC becoming a strong influence on the organisation of the Paralympic Games. “Before the establishment of the IPC, sport for the disabled was organised internationally by a number of sporting federations” (Howe & Jones, 2006). The IPC has an integrated functional swimming classification which has 10 classes instead of 31 which reduces the cancellation of events and number of races swimmers in several classes take part in.

Name	Swimming Stroke	Place
Alastair Smales	200m Individual Medley	10th - Heat
Alastair Smales	50m Butterfly	12th - Heat
Alastair Smales	50m Butterfly	12th - Heat
Alastair Smales	100m Freestyle	12th - Heat

==== Athens 2004 Paralympic Games ====
The Athens Paralympics was held in Greece from 17 to 28 September. The total of 19 sporting events made up the Athens Games. China dominated the medal tally and gold medal standings. Great Britain finished with the second-highest amount of gold medal and Australia had the second-highest medal tally overall (“Athens 2004,” 2020). More than 140 countries were represented at the games which was the largest representation in the history of the event.

Name	Swimming Stroke	Place	Time
Alastair Smales	50m Butterfly	1st - Heat	0:34:49
Alastair Smales	50m Butterfly	5th - Final Round	0:34:34
Peng Li	50m Butterfly	1st - Final Round	0:32:82
Alastair Smales	100m Freestyle	7th - Heat	1:24:23
Jianhua Yin	100m Freestyle	1st - Final Round	1:07:60
Alastair Smales	50m Freestyle	8th - Heat	1:24:23
Jianhua Yin	50m Freestyle	1st - Final Round	0:30:80

== Work ==
After Smales retired from swimming he went and pursued a career in air traffic control. Smales would’ve had to either complete a diploma of Aviation with Air services in Australia or alternatively complete training with the Royal Australian Air Force, which will require you to have completed year 12 or enrolment as an existing officer. (Air Traffic Controller, 2019)
