= Zhang Xiaoling =

Chinese para table tennis player

Personal information
- Born: 20 July 1957 (age 69) Qinzhou, Guangxi, China

Sport
- Sport: Table tennis
- Playing style: Right-handed penhold
- Disability class: 8
- Highest ranking: 1
Medal record
Women's para table tennis
Representing China
Paralympic Games
Gold medal – first place	1988 Seoul	Open singles
Gold medal – first place	1992 Barcelona	Singles C9
Gold medal – first place	1992 Barcelona	Teams C10
Gold medal – first place	1996 Atlanta	Teams C6–10
Gold medal – first place	1996 Atlanta	Open singles C6–10
Gold medal – first place	2000 Sydney	Singles C6–8
Gold medal – first place	2000 Sydney	Teams C6–10
Gold medal – first place	2004 Athens	Singles C6–8
Gold medal – first place	2004 Athens	Teams C6–10
Silver medal – second place	1992 Barcelona	Open singles C6–10
Bronze medal – third place	1996 Atlanta	Singles C6–8
Bronze medal – third place	2008 Beijing	Singles C8
World Championships
Gold medal – first place	2002 Taipei	Singles C8
Bronze medal – third place	2002 Taipei	Open singles standing
Bronze medal – third place	2006 Montreux	Singles C8
FESPIC Games
Gold medal – first place	1999 Bangkok	Singles C8
Gold medal – first place	1999 Bangkok	Teams C6–10
Gold medal – first place	2006 Kuala Lumpur	Singles C6–8
Silver medal – second place	1999 Bangkok	Open singles standing
Silver medal – second place	2002 Busan	Open singles standing
Silver medal – second place	2006 Kuala Lumpur	Open singles standing
Bronze medal – third place	2002 Busan	Singles C7–10
Asia and Oceania Championships
Gold medal – first place	2005 Kuala Lumpur	Singles C6–8
Gold medal – first place	2007 Seoul	Singles C8
Bronze medal – third place	2005 Kuala Lumpur	Open singles standing
FESPIC Championships
Gold medal – first place	1999 Taipei	Singles C6–8
Gold medal – first place	1999 Taipei	Doubles C6–10
Bronze medal – third place	1999 Taipei	Open singles standing

Zhang Xiaoling
- Traditional Chinese: 張小玲
- Simplified Chinese: 张小玲
Transcriptions
Standard Mandarin
- Hanyu Pinyin: Zhāng Xiǎolíng

Zhang Xiaoling (Chinese: 张小玲, born 20 July 1957) is a Chinese retired para table tennis player who won 12 Paralympic medals from 1988 to 2008.

She laboured as a sent-down youth during the Cultural Revolution. While toiling one day in 1973, she seriously sprained her right foot, which was subsequently amputated due to no timely treatment. In 1987, she won a gold medal at a national women's singles table tennis competition.

Zhang represented China for the first time at the 1988 Summer Paralympics in Seoul, and won gold in the open event. She competed in every subsequent edition of the Summer Paralympics, and won at least two medals – one in the singles event, one in the team event, and in 1992 and 1996 one in the open event – on every occasion. She represented China again at the 2008 Summer Paralympics in Beijing, but, for the first time, she only competed in the singles.
