= María Del Mar Olmedo Justicia =

Spanish Paralympic judoka (born 1983)

María Del Mar Olmedo Justicia (born August 10, 1983, in Almería) is a judo athlete from Spain. She has a disability: she is blind and a B3 type athlete. She competed in judo at the 2004 Summer Paralympics. She was the number two judo athlete in the women's + 70 Kilogram group.
