= Mike van der Zanden =

Dutch paraplegic swimmer

Medal record

Representing Netherlands

Men's swimming

Paralympic Games
Bronze medal – third place	2004 Athens	100m freestyle S10
Bronze medal – third place	2008 Beijing	100m butterfly S10

IPC European Championships
Silver medal – second place	2009 Reykjavik	100 m butterfly S10

Mike van der Zanden (born 9 March 1987 in Tilburg) is a Dutch paraplegic swimmer.

Van der Zanden represented the Netherlands at the 2004 and 2008 Summer Paralympics in Athens and Beijing. In Athens he won the bronze medal at the 100 m freestyle in the S10 class. Four years later in Beijing he finished second in his qualification heat at the 100m butterfly behind David Julian Levecq. His time of 59.97 seconds was the fourth time overall and he qualified for the final. In the final Andre Brasil from Brazil swam a new world record of 56.47 seconds, but Van der Zanden improved his time to 59.39 seconds, again behind Levocq, but in front of Benoît Huot to win his second Paralympic bronze medal.
