= Olga Barbušová =

Slovak para table tennis player

Oľga Barbušová
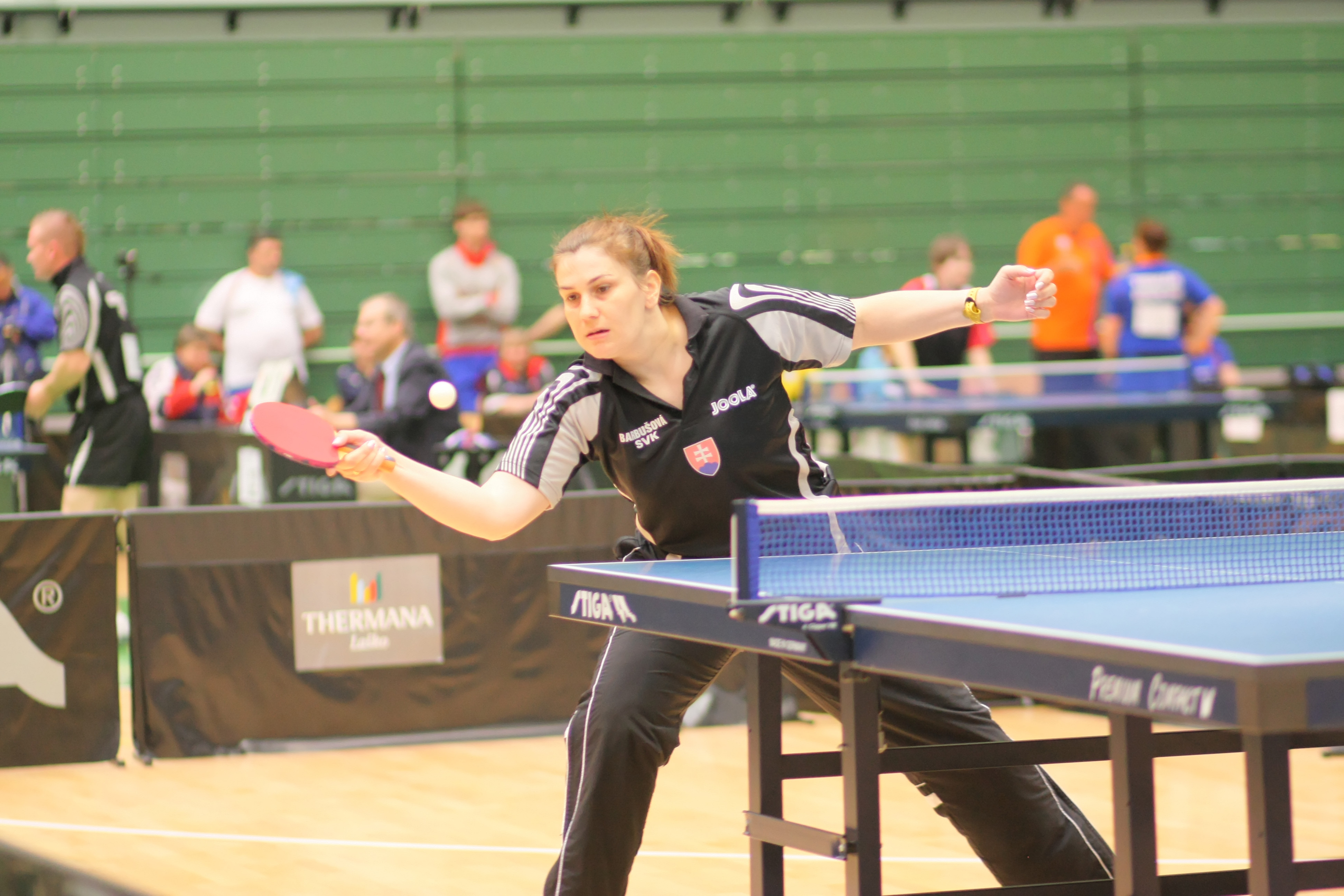
- Barbušová in 2011

Personal information
- Born: 1975 (age 50–51) Krompachy, Czechoslovakia

Sport
- Country: Slovakia
- Sport: Para table tennis
Medal record
Para table tennis
Representing Slovakia
World Championships
Silver medal – second place	2010 Gwangju	Women's singles C8
European Championships
Silver medal – second place	2007 Kranjska Gora	Women's singles C8

Oľga Barbušová (born 1975) is a Slovak former para table tennis player who competed in international table tennis competitions. She is a World and European silver medalist in the singles and has competed at the 2004 and 2008 Summer Paralympics.

== Life-changing accident ==
When Barbušová was six years old, she was walking with a friend to visit her mother and they were waiting to cross a busy road, her friend pushed her onto the road as she told her to run across the road. A truck carrying a trailer full of wood braked suddenly and Barbušová was run over and dragged by the vehicle, her left leg was severely crushed by the impact of the accident. She was taken to hospital to amputate her leg.
