= Marléen Bengtsson-Kovacs =

Swedish para table tennis player

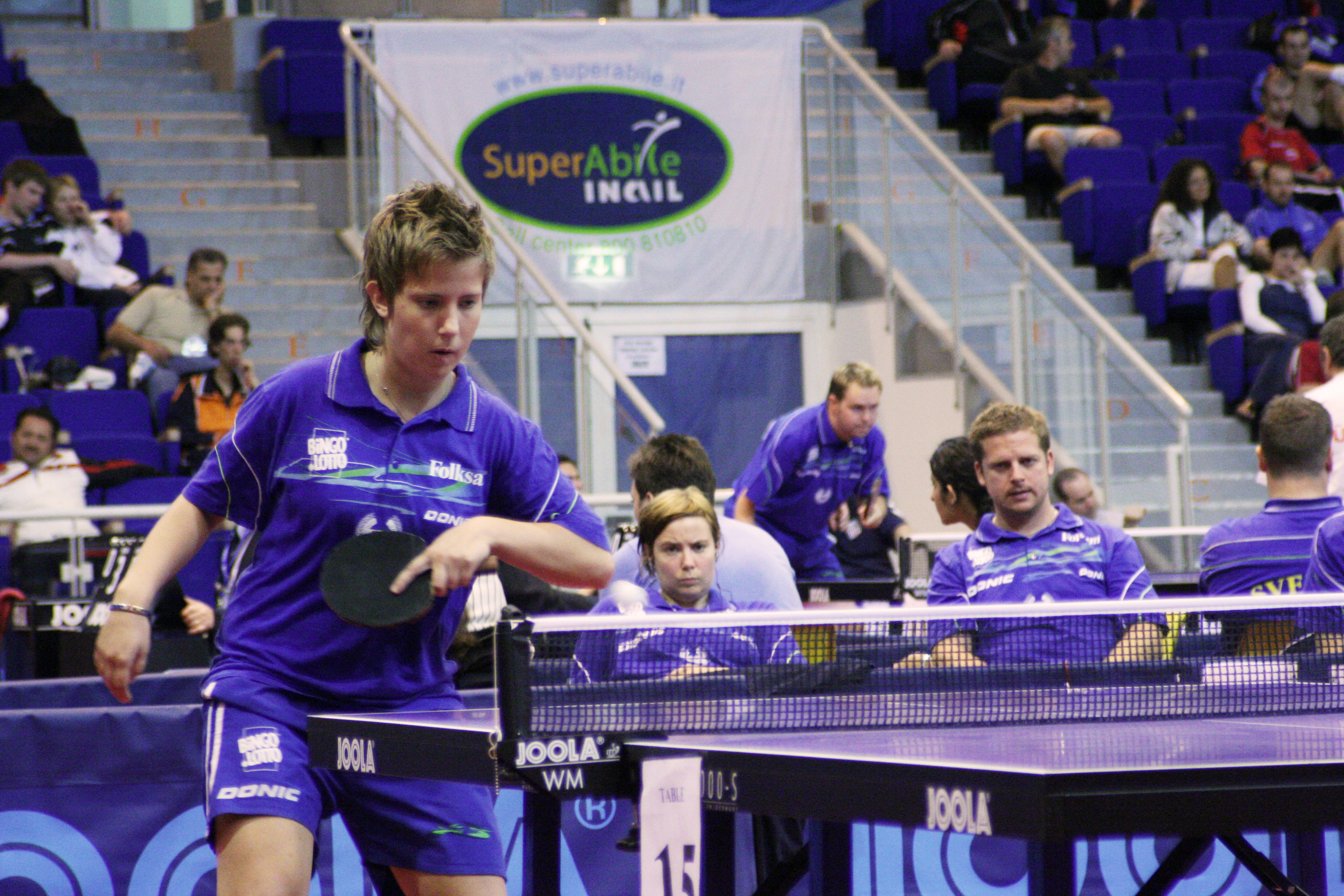
- Bengtsson-Kovacs in 2005

Personal information
- Born: 8 November 1986 (age 39) Kristianstad, Sweden

Sport
- Sport: Para table tennis
Medal record
Representing Sweden
Paralympic Games
| Silver medal – second place | 2004 Athens | Singles C6-8 |
World Championships
| Gold medal – first place | 2006 Montreux | Teams C6-8 |
| Silver medal – second place | 2006 Montreux | Singles C8 |
European Championships
| Gold medal – first place | 2005 Jesolo | Teams C6-8 |
| Gold medal – first place | 2005 Jesolo | Singles C8 |
| Gold medal – first place | 2011 Split | Teams C8 |
| Silver medal – second place | 2003 Zagreb | Singles C6-8 |
| Silver medal – second place | 2007 Kranjska Gora | Teams C8 |
| Silver medal – second place | 2013 Lignano | Teams C6-8 |
| Bronze medal – third place | 2001 Frankfurt | Teams C9 |
| Bronze medal – third place | 2007 Kranjska Gora | Singles C8 |
| Bronze medal – third place | 2015 Vejle | Singles C8 |

Eva Linnea Marléen Rosenmeier (née Bengtsson-Kovacs, born 8 November 1986) is a Swedish retired para table tennis player. She is a Paralympic silver medalist, World champion and three-time European champion. She is married to Danish para table tennis player Peter Rosenmeier.
