= Javier Crespo =

Spanish Paralympic swimmer

Personal information
- Nationality: Spanish

Sport
- Country: Spain
- Sport: Swimming

Javier Crespo is a Spanish SB9 classified swimmer who has represented Spain at the 2004, 2008 and 2012 Summer Paralympics.

== Personal ==
Crespo is from Madrid. In September 2012, he was honored at his hometown Alcobendas's townhall for his participation in the London Games. In May 2013, he participated in a charity swimming event organized by Club Natación Alcobendas that raised funds for UNICEF programs in Niger.

== Swimming ==
Crespo is an SB9 classified swimmer. He is a member of Club Natación Alcobendas, and is affiliated with the Spanish Sports Federation for Persons with Physical Disabilities (FEDDF).

Crespo competed at the 2004 Summer Paralympics. In 2007, he competed at the IDM German Open. He was one of thirteen Spanish swimmers who competed at the 2008 French Championships as part of the 2008 Paralympic qualifying process. He competed at the 2008 Summer Paralympics, finishing sixth in the 100 meter breaststroke. He set a pair of Spanish records at the 2008 Games in the 100 meter breaststroke with a time of 1:12.31 and the 4x100 Medlay event with a time of 4:21.81. He competed at the 2009 Spanish national championships, winning the 200 meter breaststroke event and setting a European record with a time of 2:41.20 and setting a Spanish record in the 50 meter breaststroke with a time of 33.26. Crespo broke the European record in the 200 meter breaststroke with a time 2:39.77 during the national championship at the 2010. He competed at the 2011 European Championships, earning a fourth-place finish in the 100 meter SB9 breaststroke event with a time of 1:12.65.

Crespo competed at the 2012 Summer Paralympics. He was one of three sportspeople from Alcobendas competing at the Games. He competed at the 2013 European Championships. He was one of fourteen swimmers from the Club Natación Alcobendas swimming club to participate in a competition at South Park Rivas Vaciamadrid in December 2013. In 2013, he was the club's most experienced swimmer with a disability.
