= Mateusz Michalski (swimmer) =

Polish Paralympic swimmer

Personal information
- Born: 12 December 1988 (age 37) Knurów, Poland

Sport
- Country: Poland
- Sport: Paralympic swimming
- Disability: Polio
- Disability class: S6
Medal record
Paralympic swimming
Representing Poland
Paralympic Games
Bronze medal – third place	2004 Athens	100m backstroke S6
Bronze medal – third place	2004 Athens	4x100m medley relay 34pts
World Championships
Silver medal – second place	2002 Mar del Plata	100m backstroke S6
Bronze medal – third place	2006 Durban	100m backstroke S6
Bronze medal – third place	2010 Eindhoven	100m breaststroke SB5

Mateusz Michalski (born 12 December 1988) is a Polish Paralympic swimmer. He won two bronze medals for swimming at the 2004 Summer Paralympics.
