= Daniel Bell (Australian swimmer) =

Australian swimmer

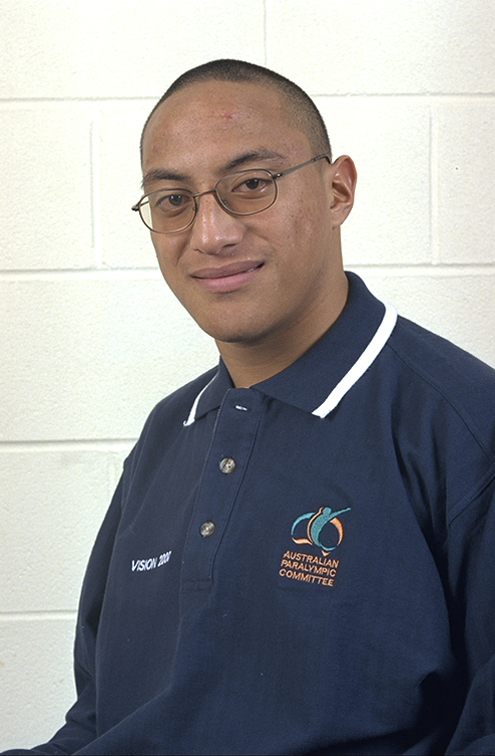
- 2000 Australian Paralympic team portrait of Bell

Personal information
- Nationality: Australia
- Born: 31 August 1984 (age 41) Pago Pago, American Samoa
Medal record
Swimming
Paralympic Games
Gold medal – first place	2004 Athens	Men's 4x100 m Medley Relay 34 pts
Silver medal – second place	2004 Athens	100m Butterfly S10
Silver medal – second place	2004 Athens	100m Breaststroke SB9
Silver medal – second place	2004 Athens	Men's 4x100 m Freestyle 34 pts
Bronze medal – third place	2000 Sydney	Men's 4x100 m Medley Relay 34 pts
IPC Swimming World Championships
Gold medal – first place	2006 Durban	Men's 4x100 m Medley Relay 34 Points
Silver medal – second place	2002 Mar Del Plata	Men's 100 m Freestyle Relay 34 pts
Bronze medal – third place	2002 Mar Del Plata	Men's 100 m Butterfly S10

Daniel Bell (born 31 August 1984) is an Australian swimmer from American Samoa who won five Paralympic medals between 2000 and 2008.

== Early life ==
Bell was born in Pago Pago, American Samoa. He was adopted by Liz Bell, a volunteer in a Samoan hospital, at the age of six months. Doctors informed her that he had cerebral palsy and brain damage, and was blind. His adoptive mother brought him back to Ocean Grove, near Geelong, determined to get support for his disabilities. He attended Christian College, Geelong, where he took up swimming.

== Career ==
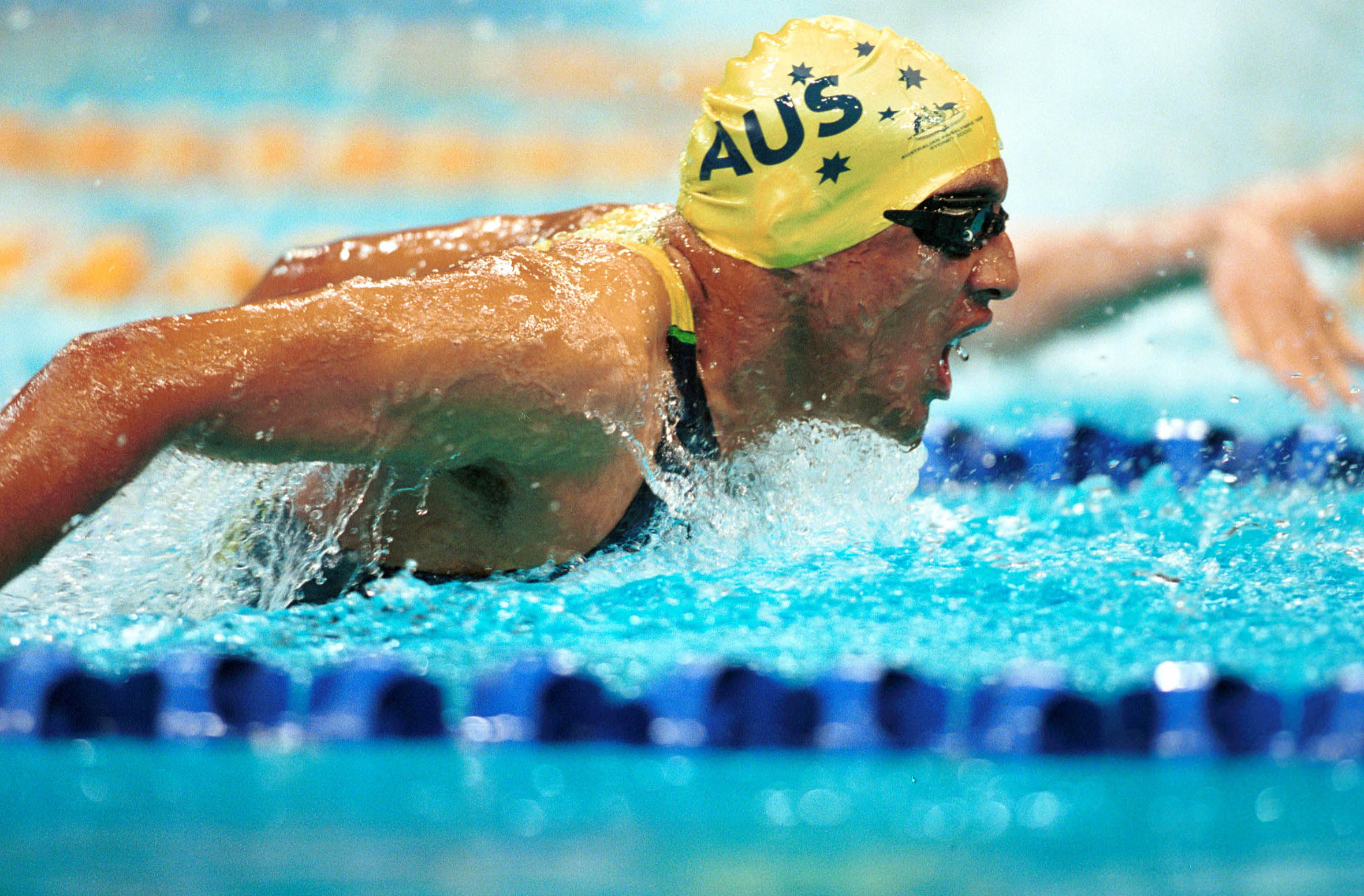
Close up action shot of Bell at the 2000 Sydney Paralympics

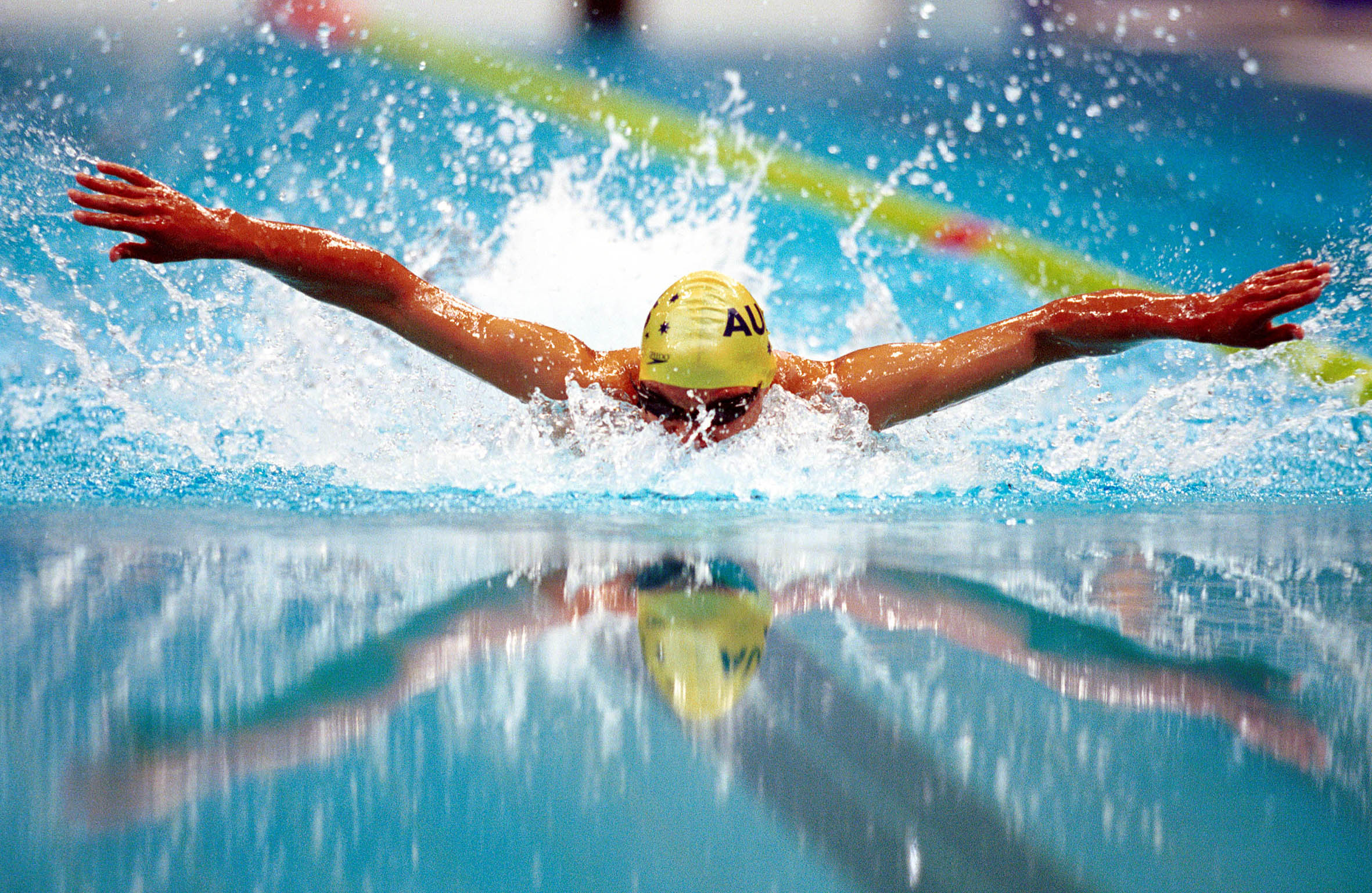
Bell in the pool at the 2000 Sydney Paralympics

Bell began his international career with a bronze medal at the 1999 FESPIC Games in Bangkok, Thailand. He competed in five events at the 2000 Sydney Paralympics and one a bronze medal in the men's 4x100 m medley relay 34 pts event. At the 2004 Athens Games, he won a gold medal in the men's 4 x 100 m medley relay 34 points and three silver medals in the men's 100 m butterfly S10, men's 100 m breaststroke SB9 and men's 4 x 100 m freestyle relay 34 points events.

He was awarded a Medal of the Order of Australia for winning the gold medal, but resigned as a member of the Order and returned the medal on 8 July 2013. He competed in four events at the 2008 Beijing Games but did not win a medal.

At the 2002 IPC Swimming World Championships in Mar Del Plata, Argentina, he won a bronze medal in the men's 100 m butterfly S10 and at the 2006 Championships in Durban, South Africa he won a gold medal in men's 4 x100 m medley relay S34 points.

From 2003 to 2008, he held an Australian Institute of Sport paralympic swimming scholarship. He is coached at Geelong City Aquatic Club by Lucky Weerakkody.

Bell now works as a commercial diver.

== Personal life ==
On 30 August 2012, Bell pleaded guilty to stalking and burglary charges in the Geelong Magistrates' Court. The charges related to offences that Bell had committed in December 2011 and January 2012; in both instances, Bell trespassed into the home of a woman while she was out, took his clothes off and entered her bed. His defence lawyer attributed his behaviour to an adverse reaction to a prescription drug, saying: "He was hearing voices and ... was no longer in control of himself." Bell was placed on an 18-month community corrections order that required him to undergo mental health treatment and rehabilitation, along with programs to prevent re-offending.
