= Australian Paralympic Equestrian Team =

Equestrian was first introduced to in the 1984 Summer Paralympics and consisted of 12 events, all of which were mixed.

Australia first started participating Equestrian in the 1996 Summer Paralympics

== Medal tally ==
Games	Gold	Silver	Bronze	Total
1996 Atlanta	0	0	0	0
2000 Sydney	2	0	2	4
2004 Athens	0	1	1	2
2008 Beijing	0	0	2	2
2012 London	1	0	0	1
2016 Rio	0	0	0	0
2020 Tokyo	0	0	0	0
2024 Paris	0	0	0	0
Totals (8 entries)	3	1	5	9

== Summer Paralympic Games ==
=== 1996 Atlanta ===
Australia represented by:
Women – Susan Haydon, Sharon Konemann, Sue Lee, Margaret Reynolds, Mandy Waalwyk
Coach - Mary Longden;

Officials - Manager – – Sally Francis

=== 2000 Sydney ===
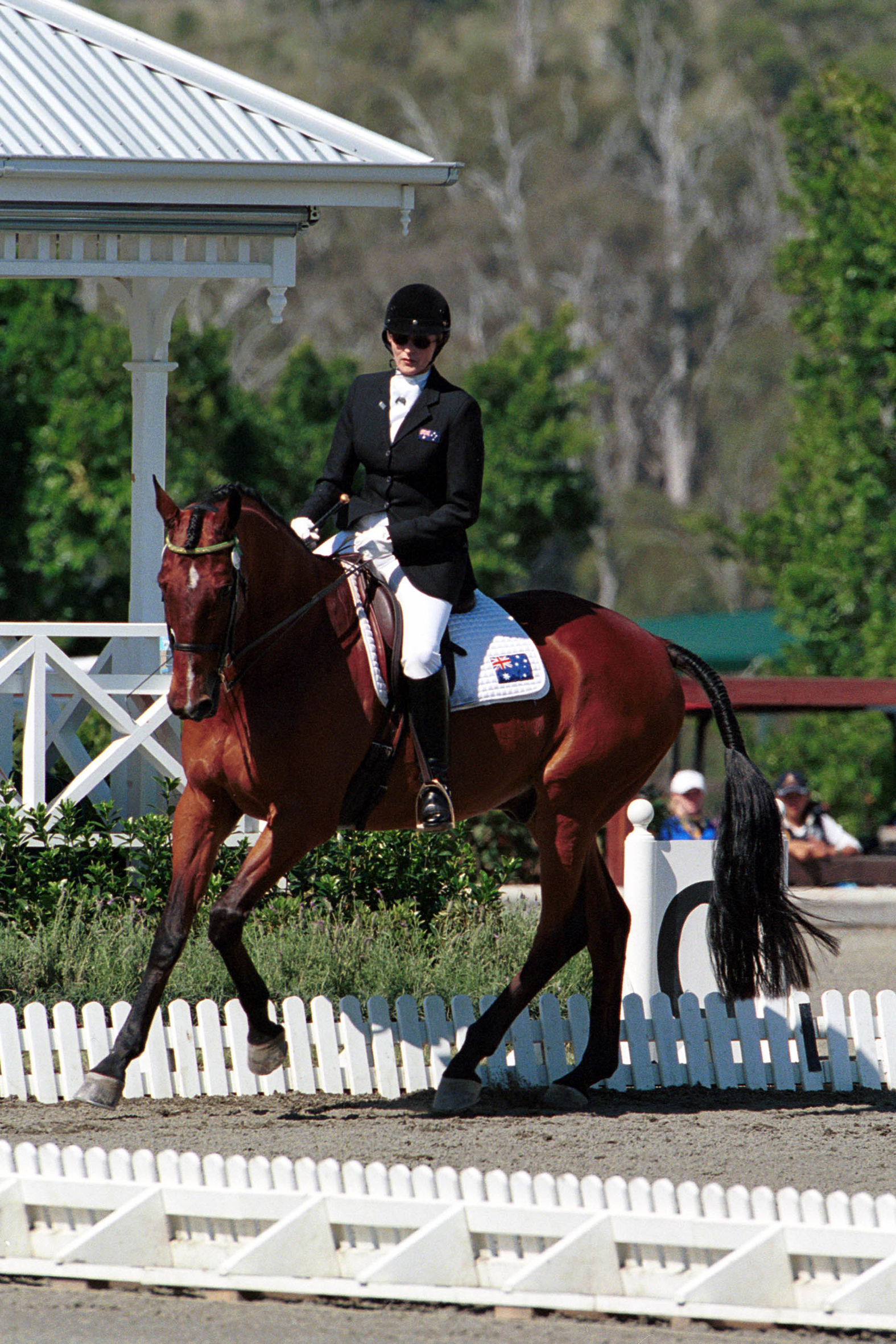
Sue-Ellen Lovett at the 2000 Paralympics, Sydney

Australia represented by:
Women - Rosalie Fahey, Sue Haydon, Julie Higgins, Marita Hird, Judy Hogan, Sue-Ellen Lovett, Anne Skinner
Coaches - Carolyn Lieutenant (Head), Gillian Rickard
Officials - Judy Cubitt (Chef d'Equipe), Dinah Barron

Australia won 2 gold and 2 bronze medals in its second Paralympic competition. It came second to Great Britain in the overall medal tally. Due to the team's results, Head Coach Carolyn Lieutenant won the Australian Coaching Council's Female Coach of the Year award.

=== 2004 Athens ===
Australia represented by:
Women – Georgia Bruce, Marita Hird, Jan Pike, Anne Skinner
Coaches - Gillian Rickard (Head), Anne Hall
Officials - Manager – Sue Cusack, Judy Fyfe
Jan Pike on her horse Dr Doolittle won a silver and bronze medal in dressage events.

Detailed Australian Results at the 2004 Paralympics - Individual and Team Competitions

=== 2008 Beijing ===
Australia represented by:
Women – Grace Bowman, Georgia Bruce, Sharon Jarvis, Nicole Kullen, Jan Pike
Coaches - Mary Longden (Head Coach), David Bowman, Sally Francis
Officials – Ken Dagley (Section Manager), Doug Denby, Nicola Reynoldson, Michelle Goodrick, Judy Fyfe, Margaret Keyes, Emma Bardot, Ebony Tucker, Terrina Fairbrother, Liz Wright-Smith, Chris Elliott, Carolyn Lieutenant.
Australia won 2 bronze medals through Georgia Bruce's performances. The competition was held in Hong Kong.
Detailed Australian Results at the 2008 Paralympics - Individual and Team Competitions

=== 2012 London ===
Australia represented by:
Women - Grace Bowman, Hannah Dodd, Joann Formosa
Men - Rob Oakley
Head coach - Julia Battams
Officials - Section Manager – Sally Francis, Physioptherapist – Victoria Kahn, Veterinarian – Janine Dwyer, Grooms – Elsa Davis, Nicole King, Fay Mendez, Kate O'Brien
Three athletes attended Games for the first time. Australia won its first gold medal since the 2000 Sydney Games with Joann Formosa's medal.

Detailed Australian Results at 2012 Paralympics - Individual and Team Competitions

=== 2016 Rio ===
Australia represented by:

Women' - Emma Booth, Sharon Jarvis, Lisa Martin, Katie Umback
Head coach - Julia Battams
Officials - Team Leader - Sally Francis, Physiotherapist - Victoria Kahn, Veterinarian - Denis Goulding, Grooms - Shahira Ameen, Emma Bardot, Sam Moran, Maddison McAndrew, Carer - Raelene Booth
Detailed Australian Results at the 2016 Paralympics - Individual and Team Competitions

=== 2020 Tokyo ===
Australia represented by:
Women – Emma Booth (groom Shahira Ameen), Sharon Jarvis (groom Ashleigh Campton), Victoria Davies (groom Shae Herwig), Amelia White (groom Anke Wilming)
Head coach - Lone Joergensen
Officials - Team Leader - Stefanie Maraun, Sports Science & Medicine Manager – Alison Alcock, Veterinarian - Janine Dwyer, Carer (Emma Booth) - Raelene Booth

Detailed Australian Results at 2020 Paralympics - Individual and Team Competitions

=== 2024 Paris ===
Australia represented by:
Women – Dianne Barnes, Stella Barton, Lisa Martin, Bridget Murphy
Officials – Team Leader - Nick Hunter, Assistant Team Leader / Chef d’Equipe - Michelle Battams, Technical Lead - Julia Battams, Personal coaches - Monica Bird, Sally Francis Grooms - Katherin Arton, Ashleigh Campton, Rebecca Haythorpe, Maddison McAndrew, Personal carer - Sarah Barton, Sarah Barton Veterinarian - Janine Dwyer

Detailed Australian Results at 2024 Paralympics - Individual and Team Competitions

(d) Paralympic Games debut
