= List of Australian equestrians =

This is a list of Australian equestrians across all disciplines.

== B ==
- Kevin Bacon (1932–2020)
- Mervyn Bennet (born 1944)
- Emma Booth (born 1991)
- Grace Bowman (born 1990)
- Georgia Bruce (born 1981)
- Olivia Bunn (born 1979)
- Chris Burton (born 1981)

== C ==
- Brien Cobcroft (1934–2010)

== D ==
- Hannah Dodd (born 1992)
- Phillip Dutton (born 1963)

== F ==
- Rosalie Fahey
- Joann Formosa (born 1961)
- Clayton Fredericks (born 1967)
- Lucinda Fredericks (born 1965)

== G ==
- David Green (born 1960)
- Sam Griffiths (born 1972)

== H ==
- Mary Hanna (born 1954)
- Julia Hargreaves (born 1986)
- Sue Hearn (born 1956)
- Julie Higgins (born 1958)
- Marita Hird (born 1971)
- Andrew Hoy (born 1959)

== J ==
- Sharon Jarvis (born 1978)
- Vaughn Jefferis (born 1961)
- Sonja Johnson (born 1967)
- Megan Jones (born 1976)

== K ==
- Scott Keach (born 1965)
- Nicole Kullen (1980–2018)

== L ==
- Neale Lavis (1930–2019)
- Kelly Layne (born 1975)
- Laurie Lever (born 1947)
- Sue-Ellen Lovett (born 1959)

== M ==
- Lisa Martin (born 1972)
- Lawrence Morgan (1915–1997)
- Rebel Morrow (born 1977)

== O ==
- Rob Oakley (born 1962)
- Kristy Oatley (born 1978)
- Lyndal Oatley (born 1980)

== P ==
- James Paterson-Robinson (born 1978)
- Denis Pigott (born 1946)
- Jan Pike (born 1952)

== R ==
- Gillian Rolton (1956–2017)
- Shane Rose (born 1973)
- Bill Roycroft (1915–2011)
- Vicki Roycroft (born 1953)
- Wayne Roycroft (born 1946)
- Heath Ryan (born 1958)
- Matthew Ryan (born 1964)

== S ==
- Wendy Schaeffer (born 1974)
- Janine Shepherd (born 1962)
- Anne Skinner (born 1954)
- Wayne Slattery (born 1970)

== T ==
- Bunty Thompson (1925–2017)
- Stuart Tinney (born 1964)
- Maree Tomkinson (born 1968)
- Edwina Tops-Alexander (born 1974)

== U ==
- Katie Umback (born 1973)
- Art Uytendaal (born 1931)

== W ==
- Meg Wade (born 1961)
- Matt Williams (born 1985)
- May Wirth (1894–1978)
