= GRRRR!! (Girl Monstar album) =

Studio album by Girl Monstar
- Released: January 2026
- Recorded: 2025
- Genre: Rock
- Length: 36:28
- Label: Vicious Kitten Records

GRRRR!! is the second studio album by Australian rock band Girl Monstar, released on 27 January 2026. It marked the band's first new music since 1992. Its release was also announced on Australian online music news website Noise11. The album’s release was also noted by Australian music publication Rhythms, which reported that GRRRR!! marked Girl Monstar’s first new album in 34 years.

== Track listing ==
No.	Title	Writer(s)	Length
1.	"Hate Train"	Sherry Rich, Anne McCue, Ros Zimmerman
2.	"Control Babe"	Anne McCue
3.	"Blue Cats with Green Eyes"	Sherry Rich, Anne McCue
4.	"Rats"	Sherry Rich, Anne McCue
5.	"Love Song for a Street Kid"	Sherry Rich, Anne McCue
6.	"I Don’t Wanna Know"	Sherry Rich
7.	"Soul Position"	Anne McCue
8.	"Mohawk Wig"	Sherry Rich, Anne McCue, Susan Shaw, Janene Abbott
9.	"Slippin’ Through The Cracks"	Sherry Rich
10.	"Rain is Coming"	Anne McCue

== Personnel ==
Girl Monstar

- Anne McCue: lead guitar, keyboards, lead vocals (tracks 2, 5, 7, 10)
- Sherry Rich: guitar, lead vocals (tracks 1, 3, 4, 6, 8, 9)
- Susan Shaw: drums, backing vocals
- Janene Abbott: bass, backing vocals

== Reception ==
In a review for I-94 Bar, GRRRR!! was praised for its groove-driven sound and melodic strength. The reviewer highlighted the rhythm section's "smooth 'n' slinky" feel and noted the band's blend of neo-garage rock with pop sensibilities. Tracks such as Hate Train, Soul Position, Control Babe, and Blue Cats With Green Eyes were singled out, while the rawer songs Mohawk Wig and Rats were cited as energetic highlights. The review concluded that GRRRR!! represents "a great return that holds up."

Music blog The Rearview Mirror noted that the band's new material on GRRRR!!, led by tracks such as Hate Train and Blue Cat With Green Eyes, showed Girl Monstar "poised to make you want to rock out with them all over again".

The release of the second single from the album, Hate Train, along with its accompanying video, was noted by online music news sites Backseat Mafia and The Rockpit.
