= Monstereo Delicio =

Studio album by Girl Monstar
- Released: July 1992
- Recorded: 1990–1991
- Studio: Sing Sing Studios, Melbourne; Periscope Studios, Melbourne; Platinum Studios, Melbourne
- Genre: Rock
- Length: 42:00
- Label: Timberyard/MDS
- Producer: Kevin "Caveman" Shirley; Paul Kosky; Darren McCormack

Monstereo Delicio is a rock album by Australian all-girl group, Girl Monstar, which was released in July 1992 via Timberyard Records. Its name references the tropical flowering plant, Monstera deliciosa, or fruit salad plant. The album was recorded by the line-up of Damian Child on bass guitar and backing vocals; Anne McCue on lead guitar, lead vocals and piano; Sherry Valier (a.k.a. Sherry Rich) on guitar, lead vocals and harmonica; and Susie World on drums, percussion and backing vocals. Prior to its release Child was replaced by Janene Abbott, who appears on the cover art but did not provide any recorded material. Tracks 1 to 10 were co-produced by Paul Kosky and Darren McCormack (a.k.a. Jedd Starr). Their earlier single, "Joe Cool", had been released in June 1990 and, with its B-side, provides two bonus tracks on this album.

== Track listing ==
No.	Title	Writer(s)	Length
1.	"Are You Ever?"	Sherry Rich	3:14
2.	"Teenage Dinosaur"	Rich	3:01
3.	"Higher Than High"	Anne McCue	3:25
4.	"Jason, Please"	Rich	4:38
5.	"Don't Blame Me"	Rich	3:39
6.	"Johnny"	McCue	3:04
7.	"Maneater"	Rich	3:06
8.	"He's So Cruel"	McCue	2:51
9.	"My Baby Makes Me (Stay Up All Night)"	Rich	2:35
10.	"Head Banger (I Love You)"	Rich, Russell Berther, J Bowers	3:24
11.	"Joe Cool" (bonus track)	Rich	3:23
12.	"Egomaniac" (bonus track)	McCue	3:38

== Personnel ==
Girl Monstar

- Sherry Valier: guitar, lead vocals (tracks 1, 2, 4, 5, 7, 9, 11), harmonica
- Anne McCue: guitars (lead, acoustic, slide), lead vocals (tracks 3, 6, 8, 12), piano
- Susie World: drums, percussion, backing vocals, lead vocals (track 10)
- Damian Child: bass (played bass on all tracks)
- Janene Abbott: bass (did not play on this album)

== Reception ==
On the 2XX Canberra radio station's Independent Album Chart for Thursday, 1 October 1992, the album was at number 3.

== Miscellaneous ==
Original bass player, Damian Child, recorded all bass parts on the album – though her replacement Janene Abbott appears on the cover art. Monstereo Delicio first ten tracks were recorded in 1991 at Periscope and Platinum Studios in Melbourne. Russell "Rusty" Berther (Rich's brother) from Australian comedy duo, Scared Weird Little Guys, co-wrote 'Headbanger - I Luv U' with Rich and J Bowers. The two bonus tracks, originally released on a 7" single, "Joe Cool" in June 1990, were produced by Kevin "Caveman" Shirley and were recorded at Sing Sing Studios in Melbourne.
