= Timber Yard =

Timber yard may refer to:

- Lumber yard in British English variants
- Timberyard Records
