= Timberyard (disambiguation) =

Timberyard may refer to:

- Lumber yard, a place for selling lumber or timber
- Timberyard Records, an Australian record label
- Timberyard Social Housing in Dublin, Ireland, a winner of the RIBA International Award
- Timberyard Layout, a neighborhood of Bangalore
