= Joe Cool =

Joe Cool may refer to:

== People ==
- Joe Burrow (born 1996), American football quarterback
- John Dorahy (born 1954), Australian rugby league footballer and coach
- Joe Flacco (born 1985), American football quarterback
- Joe Montana (born 1956), American football quarterback
- Joe Namath (born 1943), American football quarterback

== Other uses ==
- "Joe Cool" (song), a 1991 single by Girl Monstar
- Snoopy, who adopts the alias in the comic strip Peanuts
- A song by Vince Guaraldi and Desirée Goyette performed by B. B. King singing about Snoopy's personna on the Happy Anniversary, Charlie Brown album

== See also ==
- Joe Chill, a fictional criminal from the Batman franchise
- Joe Kuhel, American baseball player and manager
