= Is That All You Wanted =

EP by Sherry Rich
- Released: 1997
- Recorded: January 1997, Quad Studios, Vortex Studios, Nashville, Tennessee, USA
- Genres: Alternative, Country
- Labels: Rubber Records, BMG

Sherry Rich chronology
Sherry Rich & Courtesy Move (1997)	Is That All You Wanted (1997)	Polite Kisses (1998)

Is That All You Wanted is Sherry Rich's third EP, released in 1997. The title track is lifted from her 1997 studio album Sherry Rich & Courtesy Move

== Background ==
'Is That All You Wanted' is from the Sherry Rich and Courtesy Move studio album released in 1997. The song was recorded by Robb Earls at Quad and Vortex studios in Nashville, Tennessee in January 1997. The song was mixed by Jonathan Pines and Jay Bennett at Private studios, Urbana, Illinois in March, 1997.

== Track listing ==
1. Is That All You Wanted
2. Jetstream Over Nashville
3. Young Love Drives
4. Lonely and Far From Home

== Release history ==
Tracks 2, 3 and 4 were recorded by Cal Orr in Melbourne in October, 1997. To promote the release of this song, Rich made an appearance on the Australian music TV show Recovery.

== Personnel ==
- Sherry Rich - lead vocal, acoustic guitar
- Jay Bennett - lead guitar, background vocals
- John Stirratt - bass, background vocals
- Ken Coomer - drums

Guest Musicians

The songs 'Jetstream Over Nashville', 'Young Love Drives' and 'Lonely and Far From Home' featured:

- Nick Volk - bass guitar, pedal steel
- Sherry Rich - acoustic guitar, vocals, harmonica
- Cal Orr - drums, additional guitar
- James Dixon - additional backing vocals
