= Joe Cool (song) =

Single by Girl Monstar

from the album Monstereo Delicio
- A-side: "Joe Cool"
- B-side: "Egomaniac"
- Released: June 1990
- Recorded: Sing Sing Studios, Melbourne
- Genre: rock
- Length: 3:23
- Label: Timberyard Records
- Songwriter(s): Sherry Rich
- Producer(s): Kevin Shirley

Girl Monstar singles chronology
"Surfin' on a Wave of Love" (1989)	"Joe Cool" (1990)

"Joe Cool" is the second single by Australian rock band Girl Monstar. Both songs from the single were included as bonus tracks on the band's 1992 debut album, Monstereo Delicio.

Both songs were produced, arranged and engineered by Kevin Shirley (Iron Maiden, Journey, Rush, Led Zeppelin). This was also the debut recording of Anne McCue who wrote and sung lead vocals on the B-side track "Egomaniac". The single was released on blue 7" vinyl.

The single was released in June 1990 and received heavy rotation on national broadcaster, Triple J, ultimately reaching No. 1 on Australia's independent charts. In late 1990 Girl Monstar performed the song "Joe Cool" on the nationally broadcast Countdown Revolution. It was also subsequently nominated for Best Independent Release at the 1991 ARIA Music Awards.

The release was also available as a cassette single.

== Track listing ==
No.	Title	Writer(s)	Length
1.	"Joe Cool"	Sherry Rich	3:23
2.	"Egomaniac"	Anne McCue	3:38

== Personnel ==
Band members

- Sherry Valier – lead vocals ("Joe Cool"), guitar
- Anne McCue – guitar, lead vocals ("Egomaniac")
- Damian Child – bass, backing vocals
- Sue World – drums, backing vocals

Recording process

- Producer – Kevin Shirley
- Engineer – Kevin Shirley
  - Assistant engineer – Peter 'Bruce' Lees, Miranda McCauley
- Mastering – Leon Zervos
- Recording Studio – Sing Sing Studios, Melbourne
  - Mixing studio – Rich Studios, Sydney
