= Helicopter (disambiguation) =

A helicopter is an aircraft which is lifted and propelled by one or more horizontal rotors.

Helicopter may also refer to:

== In music ==
- Helicopters (band), an Australian new wave band of the 1980s
- The Helicopters, a South African pop rock band of the 1980s
- The Hellacopters, a Swedish garage rock band active from 1994 to 2008
- Helicopter (album), a 2009 album by Download

=== Songs ===
- "Helicopter" (ASAP Rocky song), 2026, also known as "Helicopter$"
- "Helicopter" (Bloc Party song), 2004
- "Helicopter" (CLC song), 2020
- "Helicopter" (Martin Garrix and Firebeatz song), 2014
- "Helicopter", a song by The Feeling from Twelve Stops and Home, 2006
- "Helicopter", a song by Deerhunter from Halcyon Digest, 2010
- "Helicopter", a song by Maisie Peters from the soundtrack of Trying: Season 2, 2021
- "Helicopter", a song by M. Ward from Transfiguration of Vincent, 2003
- "Helicopter", a song by XTC from Drums and Wires, 1979
- "Helicopters", a song by the Barenaked Ladies from Maroon, 2000
- "The Helicopter Song", a song by the Irish band the Wolfe Tones
- "Helikopter", a song by Bosnian singer Fazlija, popular on TikTok

== In television ==
- "Helicopter", an episode of the television series Drake & Josh
- "Helicopter", an episode of the television series Teletubbies
- Helicopter (Bluey), an episode of the animated television series Bluey

== In plants ==
- Helicopter, a Samara fruit falling in spiral
- Helicopter tree (Gyrocarpus americanus)

== Other uses ==
- "Helicopter", a style of delivery in ten-pin bowling
- Helicopter parents, a pejorative term for parents who excessively monitor or intervene in their children's lives
- Helicopters (NZ), a New Zealand–based helicopter operator
