= The Dubrovniks =

Australian rock band

- Also known as: The Adorable Ones
- Origin: Sydney, New South Wales, Australia
- Genres: Rock
- Years active: 1986–1995, 2015–present
- Labels: Citadel, Timberyard, Mushroom/Festival, Normal/MDS
- Past members: James Baker; Roddy Radalj; Peter Simpson; Boris Sujdovic; Christopher Flynn; Glenn Armstrong
- Website: thedubrovniks.com

The Dubrovniks were an Australian rock band which formed in August 1986 as The Adorable Ones. Early in 1987 they changed their name to The Dubrovniks in acknowledgement to the city of Dubrovnik in Croatia, which was the birthplace of two founding members, Roddy Radalj, and Boris Sujdovic. Both Radalj and fellow founder James Baker had previously founded Hoodoo Gurus (as Le Hoodoo Gurus) in 1981. All three had earlier associations in the Perth punk scene of the late 1970s. The group issued four albums, before disbanding in 1995.

== History ==
The Dubrovniks were established in August 1986 as The Adorable Ones with the line up of James Baker on drums (ex-The Victims, The Scientists, Hoodoo Gurus, Beasts of Bourbon, James Baker Experience); Roddy Radalj on guitar and vocals (ex-Exterminators, The Scientists, Rockets, Le Hoodoo Gurus, The Johnnys, Love Rodeo, James Baker Experience); Peter Simpson on guitar and vocals (ex-Teeny Weenies, Super K, Spectre's Revenge, Hoi Polloi); and Boris Sujdovic on bass guitar (ex-Exterminators, The Scientists, Rockets, Beasts of Bourbon). Early in the next year The Adorable Ones renamed themselves as The Dubrovniks to honour the birthplace of Radalj and Sujdovic – the historical Croatian city of Dubrovnik. They had to change their name due to a Brisbane band of that name. Australian musicologist, Ian McFarlane, described their sound as "clattering, yet accessible rock'n'roll was drawn along the lines of The Troggs meets T-Rex by way of New York Dolls".

Citadel Records issued the group's debut single, "Fireball of Love", in April 1988. It was produced by Rob Younger (Lime Spiders, Died Pretty, The Stems). Their second single was a cover version of Alvin Stardust's "My Coo Ca Choo" in November. A third single, "Speedway Girls" appeared in June 1989, followed by their debut album, Dubrovnik Blues, in August. It was produced by Chris Masuak for Timberyard Records. By that time Radalj had left and formed a new band, The Punjabbers, with Brett Ford on drums (ex-Kryptonics, Lubricated Goat); Tony Robertson on bass guitar (ex-The Hitmen, New Christs, Naked Lunch); and Tony Thewlis on guitar (ex-Helicopters, The Scientists).

Chris Flynn on guitar and vocals (ex-Headstones) replaced Radalj and the band signed to Mushroom Records. The band's first album on Mushroom, Audio Sonic Love Affair appeared in September 1990. It was produced by Kevin Shirley (Hoodoo Gurus, The Angels, Cold Chisel) and was preceded by the single, "She Got no Love" in June. Another single, "Love Is on the Loose", followed in October. In between albums, Baker and Sujdovic toured and recorded with Beasts of Bourbon. In early 1991 they severed their commitments to that group to concentrate on The Dubrovniks. Also in that year Glenn Armstrong (ex-Horny Toads, The Girlies) replaced Simpson on guitar.

The band issued their third album, Chrome in June 1992, which was also produced by Shirley. The album provided two singles, "Saigon Rose" (February 1992) and "French Revolution" (June). McFarlane noted that both albums with Mushroom "maintained the revved-up, trashy rock'n'roll tradition". However, Mushroom dropped the group in 1993. German label, Normal, issued their fourth album, Medicine Wheel in Europe, while Mushroom Distribution Services (MDS) distributed it in Australia.

The Dubrovniks broke up in 1995. Afterwards Baker returned to Perth, where he joined a power pop band, Satellite 5. Flynn and Sujdovic formed a new band, Black Dirt, together with Chris Collins and Paul Loughhead. The Dubrovniks reformed in 2015 to play a series of shows in Australia, Greece, Spain and Austria.

== Members ==
Alphabetical list:

- Glenn Armstrong – guitar, backing vocals (1990–1994)
- James Baker – drums, percussion (1988–1994) (died 2025)
- Christopher Flynn – guitar, vocal (1989–1993)
- Roddy Radalj – guitar, bass, vocals (1988–1989)
- Peter Simpson – guitar, piano, vocals (1988–1990), (1993–1994)
- Boris Sujdovic – bass, guitar, vocals (1988–1994)
- Tony Thewlis – guitar (late 1980s)

== Discography ==
=== Albums ===
Title	Album details
Dubrovnik Blues	Released: August 1989; Label: Timberyard (SAW 003)
Audio Sonic Love Affair	Released: September 1990; Label: Festival Records (L30369)
Chrome	Released: June 1992; Label: Mushroom (MUSH32093.2)
Medicine Wheel	Released: 1994; Label: Normal/MDS (NORMAL 167 CD)

=== Singles ===
- "Fireball of Love" (Sujdovic) / "If I Had a Gun" (Baker, Simpson, Sujdovic, Radalj) – Citadel (CIT036) (April 1988)
- "My Coo Ca Choo" (Peter Shelley) / "Girls Go Maniac" (Radalj, Sujdovic) – Citadel (CIT043) (November 1988)
- "Speedway Girls" (Sujdovic) / "Freezing Rain" (Simpson, Sujdovic, Radalj) – Timberyard (BUZZ 005) (June 1989)
- "She Got No Love"/"Got This Far" - Mushroom (K10088) (June 1990)
- "Love is on the Loose Tonight"/"Something's Not Right in This World" - Normal/Mushroom (NORMAL 137)/(K 10176) (October 1990)
- "Saigon Rose" - Mushroom (D11031) (February 1992)
- "French Revolution" (Flynn) – Survival (SUR 707 CD) (June 1992)

== Awards and nominations ==
=== ARIA Music Awards ===
The ARIA Music Awards is an annual awards ceremony held by the Australian Recording Industry Association. They commenced in 1987.

Year	Nominee / work	Award	Result	Ref.
1990	Dubrovnik Blues	Best Independent Release	Nominated	
