= Too Late for Love =

Too Late for Love may refer to:

- Too Late for Love (film), a 1968 Hong Kong film
- "Too Late for Love" (Def Leppard song), a 1983 song by Def Leppard
- "Too Late for Love" (John Lundvik song), a 2019 song, Swedish entry to Eurovision Song Contest 2019
- "Too Late for Love", a song by Anne McCue from East of Electric
- "Too Late for Love", a song by Fair Warning from Rainmaker
- "2 Late 4 Love", a song by Tesla from Mechanical Resonance

== See also ==
- "Too Late for Lovers", a song by Gin Wigmore
