= Black helicopter (disambiguation) =

A black helicopter is a symbol related to conspiracy theories.

Black Helicopter or Black Helicopters may refer to:

- Black Helicopter (band), a band in Massachusetts, USA
- Black Helicopters, a band from Leeds, UK, members from which went on to form ¡Forward, Russia!
- "Black Helicopters," a song by Non Phixion from the 2002 album The Future Is Now

== See also ==
- Helicopter (disambiguation)
- Black (disambiguation)
