= Kevin K =

American musical artist

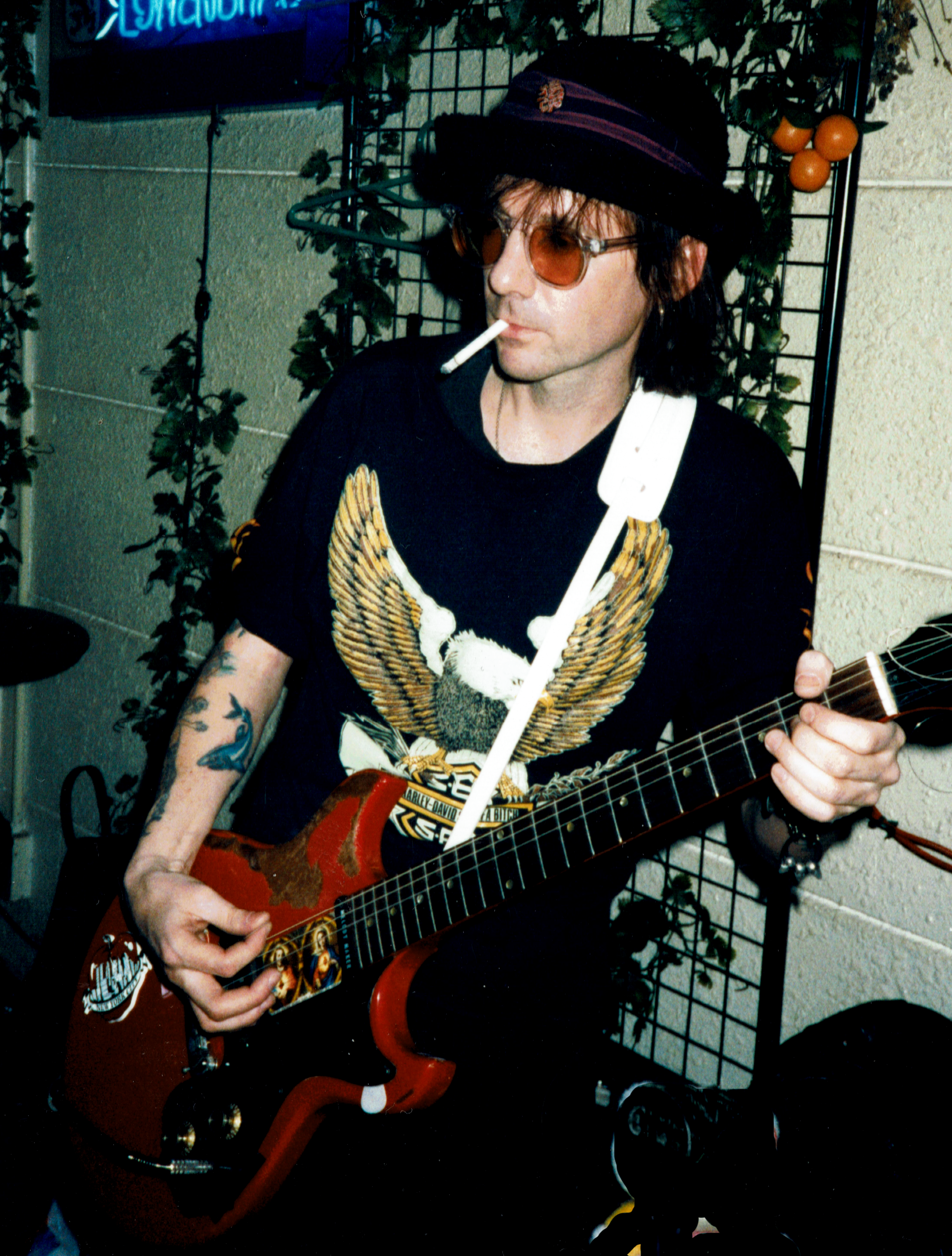
- Kevin K performing live at Let It Be livehouse, Tokyo, Japan – Sunday, 20 December 1998

Background information
- Born: Kevin Kalicki; 1957 (age 68–69); Buffalo, New York, U.S.
- Origin: Pendleton, New York, U.S.
- Genres: Punk rock, rock and roll, glam punk
- Occupations: Musician, songwriter, author
- Years active: 1978–present
- Labels: Rock Starr Records, Maxwell Music, Playtime Records, Caroline Records, Circumstantial Records, 13th Street Records, Vicious Kitten Records

Kevin K (born Kevin Kalicki in 1957) is an American punk rock musician, songwriter, and author. He is known for his prolific solo career and for playing in a number of underground punk and rock bands since the late 1970s. His music spans punk rock, glam, and street rock, and he has released more than 38 albums.

== Early life ==
Kevin K was born and raised in Pendleton, New York, a rural town outside Buffalo. He is the son of World War II veteran Alvin Kalicki. Alongside his older brother Alan Kalicki (also known as Alan K), Kevin began playing music in his teens.

== Career ==
=== Early bands ===
Kevin K’s first notable band was Grimm Reaper, followed by Aunt Helen. In 1978, Aunt Helen released their debut single "Big Money" on Rock Starr Records.

In 1979, Kevin and Alan K formed The Toys, one of Buffalo's pioneering punk bands. The Toys released a 7" single titled "Say It" in 1980 on Maxwell Music. After relocating to New York City, the band changed their name to The New Toys, releasing a full-length LP, also titled Say It, in 1982 on Playtime Records. The group remained active until 1984.

=== Lone Cowboys and international recognition ===
Following the breakup of The New Toys, the Kalicki brothers formed Lone Cowboys. The band gained international attention with a punk remake of Debbie Boone's "You Light Up My Life", which charted at number 20 on Sweden’s independent music chart. They signed to Caroline Records and released the album Voodoo Dolls & Cadillac Fins in 1986. The Lone Cowboys disbanded in 1989.

=== Road Vultures and collaborations ===
From 1990 to 1996, Kevin and Alan K fronted the band Road Vultures. The group supported ex-New York Dolls members Sylvain Sylvain and Jerry Nolan’s band, The Ugly Amerikans, at the Continental Divide club in New York City. Road Vultures released two albums on Circumstantial Records: Fire It Up and Ride. Notably, Fire It Up features guitarist Cheetah Chrome of the Dead Boys.

Alan K died on November 10, 1996.

=== Solo career ===
Kevin K launched his solo career in 1995 with the album Nightlife, released on Circumstantial Records. Since then, he has released more than 38 albums across various labels. His music continues to draw from New York punk, glam rock, and street-level storytelling.

In December 1998, Kevin K and his band toured Japan, performing in cities such as Yokohama and Kyoto. Notably, they played at 7th Avenue in Yokohama on December 14, 1998.

In 2014, Kevin K and Texas Terri released the album Firestorm on Real Kat Records, which received favorable reviews praising its gritty punk and rock sound.

In 2022, he released Cadallac Man, which received positive reviews highlighting its raw energy and rock influences.

In 2024, Kalicki relocated to Columbia, South Carolina, and released a new album titled Rosewood.

His 2025 album, Shadow Work 38, was released on Australian label Vicious Kitten Records.

In November 2026, The I-94 Bar published a favourable review of More by Kevin K and The Bowery Kats. The review praised Kevin's songwriting, strong melodies, distinctive rock sound and guitar playing, describing his lead guitar work as "economical and effective". The reviewer also commended the album's raw, unpolished rock aesthetic and highlighted the re-recording of two Road Vultures songs, "She" and "Call", as a tribute to Kevin's late brother and former bandmate Alan K. The review further acknowledged Kevin's association with New York's Lower East Side rock scene.

Kalicki is also an author and has published three books. His memoir Hey Aunt Helen ! Livin' Fast On The Road to CBGB documents his early years in the Buffalo and New York punk scenes. His 2010 book, How to Become a Successful Loser, offers autobiographical reflections on life in underground rock and the challenges of staying true to oneself. In addition, his children's book, The Adventures of Alvin the Seahorse, was published in 2023.

== Community Engagement and Veteran Support ==
In 2014, Kevin K performed a benefit concert for local military veterans in Pendleton, New York. The event aimed to support area veterans and was part of his ongoing commitment to community service and support for those who have served in the armed forces.
