= Koala Motel =

Studio album by Anne McCue
- Released: 2006
- Genre: Alternative country
- Label: Messenger Records

Anne McCue chronology
Roll (2003)	Koala Motel (2006)	East of Electric (2008)

Koala Motel is the fourth album by Australian alternative country musician Anne McCue. It was released in 2006 by Messenger Records.

The album was rated 3.5 out of 5 stars by AllMusic.

== Track listing ==
All tracks composed by Anne McCue; except where noted.

1. "Driving Down Alvarado" (A.McCue, J.Robin)
2. "From Bakersfield to Saigon"
3. "Bright Light of Day"
4. "Hellfire Raiser"
5. "Sweet Burden of Youth"
6. "Coming to You"
7. "Any Minute Now" (A.McCue D.Raven, M.McCue)
8. "Jesus' Blood"
9. "Shivers"
10. "As The Crow Flies" (T.J. White)
11. "Lay Me Down"
12. "Koala Motel" (A.McCue, M.McCue)
