= Snake Tide =

EP by You Am I
- Released: May 1991
- Recorded: February 1991
- Studio: Electric Avenue Studios, Sydney, Australia
- Genre: Alternative rock
- Label: Timberyard
- Producer: Phil Punch

You Am I chronology
Snake Tide (1991)	Goddamn (EP) (1992)

Snake Tide is the debut EP by You Am I, released in May 1991. It is the last You Am I recording to feature original bassist Nik Tischler.

== Background ==
After signing with Sydney-based independent label Timberyard Records in 1990, You Am I recorded the tracks for their first EP during February 1991 with Phil Punch at Electric Avenue Studios. Guitarist and vocalist Tim Rogers was emerging as the group's primary songwriter, though he is now somewhat dismissive of his early output: "I knew I wasn't a good songwriter. It was all dynamics: soft bit, heavy bit, soft bit, heavy bit."

Snake Tide was released in May 1991, with the official launch held at the Lansdowne Hotel on 3 June 1991.

== Track listing ==
All songs: Rogers/Tischler/Tunaley

Side one
No.	Title	Length
1.	"Drink It Dry"	3:56
2.	"New Face"	3:20
3.	"Conscience"	2:30

Side two
No.	Title	Length
1.	"Inspiral"	3:16
2.	"Home"	3:17
3.	"Snake Tide"	5:31

== Release history ==
The original 12" vinyl EP was released in May 1991.

In May 1992, four of the tracks ("Drink It Dry", "New Face", "Conscience" and "Snake Tide") were issued on CD for the first time on You Am I's second EP, Goddamn (Timberyard SAW027CD). The same four tracks appear on the European release of Goddamn, which was titled, somewhat confusingly, Snake Tide (Survival sur522cd).

In 2006, all tracks from the original Snake Tide EP appeared on the re-issue of Goddamn (Timberyard SAW522CD). This marked the first appearance on CD of the tracks "Inspiral" and "Home", although they have been taken from a vinyl source rather than the original master tape.

== Alternative versions ==
An alternative version of "Snake Tide" appears on the 7" vinyl EP Self Mutilation Volume One (Hippy Knight creep004), later re-issued on CD as Self Mutilation: one, two, three, and more (Hippy Knight CREEP 015). This recording pre-dates the version released on the Snake Tide EP.

== Personnel ==
You Am I

- Tim Rogers - vocals, guitar
- Mark Tunaley - drums
- Nik Tischler - bass

Production

- Phil Punch - engineer
- Ski - photography
- Tracey Tunaley - artwork and layout
