= Laughing (EP) =

EP by Anne McCue
- Released: 1996
- Recorded: August 1995 and September 1996
- Studio: Periscope Studios, Melbourne, Australia
- Genre: alternative country
- Length: 20:50
- Producer: Laurence Maddy and Anne McCue

Laughing was the first release by Australian alternative country musician Anne McCue. It was released in 1996. This independent release received limited airplay on the Australian airwaves via ABC's Radio National and 'Always' appeared in the Aussie indie film 'This Space Between Us' (this info courtesy www.girlmonstar.com).

== Track listing ==
All tracks are written by Anne McCue except "Angeline".

No.	Title	Writer(s)	Length
1.	"Waiting For The Son"		3:27
2.	"Always"		3:15
3.	"My Only One"		3:07
4.	"Laughing"		3:04
5.	"Angeline"	McCue, Laurence Maddy, Kevin Hunt	3:27
6.	"These Things"		4:30
Total length:			20:50

== Personnel ==
- Anne McCue
- Jonathan Russell
- Helen Mountford
- Susan Powell
- Ray Pereira
- Geoff Cain
- Simon Dawe
- Laurence Maddy
- Rob McCormack
- Michael Flynn
- Kevin Hunt
- Jeremy Rasmussen

Additional Personnel

- David Briggs (American musician) – mastering
- Laurence Maddy – engineer and mixer
- Zahren Handley, Aaron Humphrey – assistants
