= Gina Villalobos =

American singer-songwriter and composer (born 1970)

- Born: Gina Villalobos; May 26, 1970 (age 55); Los Angeles, California
- Origin: California, U.S.
- Genres: Indie pop; rock; Americana; folk rock; country rock; alternative country
- Occupations: Musician; singer; songwriter; engineer/producer; composer
- Instruments: Vocals; guitar; keyboards
- Years active: 1990–present
- Labels: Laughing Outlaw Records; Face West Records; Kick Music
- Website: ginavillalobos.com

Gina Villalobos is an American singer-songwriter and composer. From 1992 thorough 2013, she extensively toured and recorded in the US, UK and Europe, writing songs and making music in bands and as a solo artist. Villalobos has released five solo studio albums, the most recent of which is Sola (2014). She continues to sing and compose in her work as a music creator at Feverpitch, where she services the motion picture industry, specifically those companies making movie trailer music. She creates sound effects, produces music, and composes original scores.

== Early life, family and education ==
Villalobos spent her childhood in Lake Sherwood, California, a Santa Monica Mountains community. She was inspired by her mother's passion for music and her father Reynaldo Villalobos's work as an acclaimed cinematographer and director. By the time she was seven years old, Villalobos was teaching herself guitar. She began her music career at the end of college in Santa Barbara, California.

== Musical career ==
In her early 20s, Villalobos fronted and played guitar in the acoustic folk trio Liquid Sunshine. They recorded a self-titled EP and the albums Sweet Commitment and Barbary Lane before disbanding in 1996. Between 1997 and 2001, Villalobos fronted the band The Mades, with whom she recorded two albums. The start of her solo career was signified with her album Beg From Me (2002).

In 2004, she caught the attention of US publications like Paste, No Depression, Acoustic Guitar, and Harp. In anticipation of her sophomore studio album, Live from KXLU Radio was released, containing a live recording with songs off the new album. With her second outing, Rock 'N' Roll Pony, the European press and radio praised the CD, which reached No. 3 on the Euro-Americana charts, and by 2005, Villalobos was performing in Europe, Australia, and New Zealand. She toured with Laura Veirs in 2005 on her UK tour. Her 2007 self-release Miles Away received exposure in the UK and on BBC Radio 2. Around that time, the alternative rock band World Party invited Villalobos to tour the US with them. Her songs began appearing in movies and TV shows like One Tree Hill and Army Wives. Two years later, Gina delivered another album, Days on Their Side, exploring the Americana music genre.

Villalobos has been associated with Anne McCue, and has been recognized for her contribution to California songs.

In 2014, after an extended hiatus and having taken the time to produce the album since January 2012, Sola was released. Villalobos produced, and Erik Colvin engineered, which he did for her previous three albums. Augmenting Gina's vocals and guitar are guitarist Kevin Haaland (Andy Grammer), back for his fourth Gina Villalobos album, and returning guitarist Josh Grange. Also credited are Eric Heywood (Son Volt, Ray LaMontagne, The Pretenders, Alejandro Escovedo) on pedal steel. Upright bass was performed by Ian Walker. Quinn was the drummer.

In late 2015, the Golden Globe Award and Emmy Award-winning Amazon Studios TV show Transparent selected the arrangement featuring the Gina Villalobos/Eric Colvin produced version of the 1971 Sly and the Family Stone hit "Family Affair" featuring the vocals of Ruby Friedman for use in the trailer promoting the launch of Season 2.

== Personal life ==
Villalobos resides in Los Feliz, Los Angeles, California.

In October 2003, halfway through the sessions for Rock 'N Roll Party, production was halted when Villalobos sustained serious injury to her right eye. After numerous retinal surgeries, she was informed she would be permanently blind in her right eye.

== Discography ==
=== Studio albums ===
Year	Title	Label
2002	Beg from Me	Kick Music
2004	Rock 'N' Roll Pony	Laughing Outlaw Records
2007	Miles Away	Laughing Outlaw Records
2009	Days on Their Side	Face West Records
2014	Sola	Self-released

=== Live albums ===
Year	Title	Label
2004	Live from KXLU Radio	Kick Music

=== Singles ===
Year	Title	Label
2008	Can't Find My Way Home	Face West Records
2011	The Ghost in You	Face West Records
2016	World Keeps Turning	Self-released

== CD compilations ==
- Paste Magazine Sampler Number 32
- Sin City Social Cub Compilation Volume 9

== TV and film music ==
- Army Wives "Great Expectations" (Season 2, Episode 12): "I'm Alright"
- Real Sex
