= Roll (Anne McCue album) =

Studio album by Anne McCue
- Released: 2003
- Genre: Alternative country
- Label: Messenger

Anne McCue chronology
Live: Ballad of an Outlaw Woman (2002)	Roll (2003)	Koala Motel (2003)

Roll is the third album by Australian alternative country musician Anne McCue. Her first album for Messenger Records The album was released in 2004 and was picked by Bob Harris (BBC, Old Grey Whistle Test) as the best album of that year.

The song "Stupid" was included on the Time-Life box set Four decades of Folk Rock with Bob Dylan and the Byrds.

== Track listing ==
All tracks composed by Anne McCue; except where noted.

1. "I Want You Back" - 4:29
2. "Nobody's Sleeping" (A.McCue, M.McCue) - 4:41
3. "Stupid" - 4:36
4. "Crazy Beautiful Child" (A.McCue, J.Yates) - 3:48
5. "Hangman" - 6:17
6. "50 Dollar Whore" - 2:54
7. "Tiny Little Song" - 4:31
8. "Milkman's Daughter" - 5:19
9. "Roll" - 5:55
10. "Gandhi" - 3:05
11. "Where the Darkness Grows" - 6:35
12. "Ballad of an Outlaw Woman" - 6:24
13. "Machine Gun" (Jimi Hendrix) - 9:21
