= Amelia White =

Amelia White may refer to:

- Amelia White (equestrian) (born 1992), Australian para-equestrian
- Amelia White (soccer) (born 2003), American professional soccer player
- Amelia Elizabeth White (1878–1972), American philanthropist and socialite
