= Live: Ballad of an Outlaw Woman =

Live album by Anne McCue
- Released: 13 November 2002
- Recorded: 2001
- Venue: The Fillmore, San Francisco
- Genre: Alternative country
- Length: 41:20
- Label: CD Baby/Nightshade Records

Anne McCue chronology
Amazing Ordinary Things (2001)	Live: Ballad of an Outlaw Woman (2002)	Roll (2003)

Live: Ballad of an Outlaw Woman is the second album by Australian alternative country musician Anne McCue, and released in November 2002. It was recorded during an opening set for Lucinda Williams at The Fillmore in San Francisco, California. McCue provides solo vocals and unaccompanied plays both electric and acoustic guitar. Of its nine tracks, six were not previously released, she includes cover versions of "Voodoo Chile (Slight Return)" (originally by Jimi Hendrix) and "Empty Bed Blues" (Bessie Smith), and seven original tracks. The album was re-issued on Nightshade Records in the United States in 2003. McCue gave a copy of this live album to Dusty Wakeman who became her bass guitarist and co-producer of her next album, Roll (2003). In 2004 McCue planned to record a music video for "Ballad of an Outlaw Woman" at Wakeman's farm near the Joshua Tree National Park. She is currently writing a novella of the same name.

== Track listing ==
All tracks are written by Anne McCue except where noted.

No.	Title	Writer(s)	Length
1.	"Ballad of an Outlaw Woman"		5:33
2.	"My Only One"		3:23
3.	"These Things"		5:32
4.	"Voodoo Chile (Slight Return)"	Jimi Hendrix	3:59
5.	"Tiny Little Song"		4:38
6.	"Empty Bed Blues"	Jay Cee Johnson	3:31
7.	"Riding Away"	McCue; Jonathan Merrill	6:58
8.	"Fitzroy Blues"		4:08
9.	"Let It Glow"		3:38
Total length:			41:23
