= Girl Monstar =

Australian rock band

- Left to right: Damian Child, Sue World, Sherry Valier and Anne McCue in 1990

Background information
- Origin: Melbourne, Victoria, Australia
- Genre: Indie rock
- Years active: 1988–1993, 2025–present
- Label: Timberyard
- Members: Anne McCue; Sherry Valier (aka Sherry Rich); Janene Abbott; Sue World
- Past members: Damian Child; Ritchie Hine

Girl Monstar are an all female Australian rock band formed in 1988 with the line-up of Anne McCue on lead guitar and vocals; Sherry Valier (aka Sherry Rich) on vocals and rhythm guitar (ex-Cactus Fever); Sue World on drums and vocals (ex-The Wet Ones) and Damian Child on bass. Both of their singles, "Surfing on a Wave of Love" / "He's Hell" (1989) and "Joe Cool" (1990), topped the Australian Independent charts. They released one album, Monstereo Delicio, in July 1992 on Timberyard Records. Child was replaced by Janene Abbott in 1992, however the group disbanded in 1993. Australian musicologist, Ian McFarlane, described their sound "trash pop style mixed tough guitar riffs with strong harmonies". Valier as Rich, is a country rock artist and has issued solo material as well as performing in bands. McCue is also an alternative country artist, she relocated to Nashville and has released several solo albums.
In 2025, the band reunited with members Rich, McCue, Abbott, and World to record new material, which was released as the album GRRRR!!

== History ==
Girl Monstar formed in 1988 in Melbourne with the line-up of Damian Child (Feline Touch) on bass guitar and vocals; Anne McCue (Vertigo) on lead guitar, slide guitar and vocals; Sherry Valier (aka Sherry Rich)(Obscure Alternatives, Cactus Fever) on lead vocals, harmonica and rhythm guitar; and Ritchie Hine on drums. After a few months Hine left the band to join a new line-up of the Screaming Tribesmen and was replaced by Sue World (Wet Ones). The group signed with Timberyard Records and in October 1989 issued their debut double-A-sided single, "Surfing on a Wave of Love" / "He's Hell". Both tracks are written by Valier.

Early in 1990 Girl Monstar supported the Australian leg of a tour by Danish hard rock group, D. A. D., which was followed by a similar support for United States heavy metal band, Skid Row. Later that year they issued a second single, "Joe Cool", which is also written by Valier.

Both of their singles, "Surfing on a Wave of Love" / "He's Hell" and "Joe Cool", topped the Australian Independent charts. The single "Joe Cool", was produced by Kevin 'Cavemen' Shirley. The band provided a support show for The Buzzcocks and then The Ramones.

In July 1992 Girl Monstar released their debut album, Monstereo Delicio, which was produced by Paul Kosky (Not Drowning, Waving) and Jedd Starr. After it was recorded but before it was issued Child was replaced on bass guitar by Janene Abbott. The group disbanded in early 1993. Valier has a recording career as a country rock artist, Sherry Rich, which has included an album recorded with members of Wilco. She formed the groups, Sherry Rich and the Grievous Angels and Sherry Rich and Courtesy Move. Rich performed as part of The Grapes with Ash Naylor on guitar, and from 2004 in The Mudcakes, which included former Girl Monstar bandmate, Sue World and Rich's husband, Rick Plant. Anne McCue is based in Nashville and has a recording career as an alternative country solo artist.

In 2010, Girl Monstar were featured in 'Rock Chicks' – an exhibition held at Melbourne's Arts Centre, which highlighted the achievements of women in the Australian music scene.

== Reunion ==
In April 2025, it was announced via singer Sherry Rich's Instagram page that Girl Monstar had reformed. A new single, "Blue Cats with Green Eyes", was released in July 2025, with a forthcoming album of new material to follow on Vicious Kitten Records. The reformation of Girl Monstar was also reported by the Australian music website i94bar.

On 14 July 2025, Sherry Rich and Anne McCue were interviewed on the program Sound Decisions on radio station WXNAFM out of Nashville, an interview which included the airing of the single Blue Cats with Green Eyes.

In November 2025, Girl Monstar released a second single titled "Hate Train", taken from their album GRRRR!!.

The band's long-awaited second album, GRRRR!!, was released on 27 January 2026 and immediately received positive reviews, with rock n roll website i94bar describing it as "a great return that holds up".

On 29 January 2026, Sherry Rich was interviewed by Neil Rogers on The Australian Mood, a program broadcast on Melbourne radio station Triple R (3RRR).

On 13 February 2026, Girl Monstar released the music video for their protest‑infused single “Hate Train,” the second single from their new album GRRRR!!.

On 24 February 2026, Anne McCue and Sherry Rich were interviewed by Dave Graney on his radio program Banana Lounge Broadcasting on Melbourne community radio station Triple R (3RRR).

In a 9 April 2026 interview on PBS FM’s Radio City, Sherry Rich said the band’s reunion “felt like the right time,” and was prompted by the song “Blue Cats with Green Eyes.”

A third digital single, "Mohawk Wig", taken from the album GRRRR!!, was released on 21 July 2026.

== Members ==
- Damian Child – bass guitar, vocals (1988–91)
- Ritchie Hine – drums (1988)
- Anne McCue – lead guitar, vocals (1988–93, 2025 - present)
- Sherry Valier – lead vocals, guitar (1988–93, 2025 - present)
- Sue World – drums, vocals (1988–93, 2025 - present)
- Paddy Chong – bass guitar (1991)
- Janene Abbott – bass guitar (1992–93, 2025 - present)

== Discography ==
=== Albums ===
Title	Album details
Monstereo Delicio	Released: July 1992; Label: Timberyard (SAW029); Format: CD
GRRRR!!	Released: January 2026; Label: Vicious Kitten (VKR020); Format: CD

=== Singles ===
Title	Year	Album
"Surfing on a Wave of Love" / "He's Hell"	1989	non album single
"Joe Cool"	1990	Monstereo Delicio (bonus track)
"Blue Cats with Green Eyes"	2025	GRRRR!!
"Hate Train"	2025	GRRRR!!
"Mohawk Wig"	2026	GRRRR!!

=== Other appearances ===
- "Dead by Christmas" on Rockin Bethlehem – Timberyard (SAW025) (1989)
- "Is that You?" on Hard to Believe: Kiss Covers Compilation – Waterfront Records (DAMP121) (1990)

== Awards and nominations ==
=== ARIA Music Awards ===
The ARIA Music Awards are a set of annual ceremonies presented by Australian Recording Industry Association (ARIA), which recognise excellence, innovation, and achievement across all genres of the music of Australia. They commenced in 1987.

Year	Nominee / work	Award	Result	Ref.
1990	"Surfing on a Wave"/"He's Hell"	Best Independent Release	Nominated	
1991	"Joe Cool"	Best Independent Release	Nominated	
