= Vicious Kitten Records =

- Founded: 1999
- Founder: Colin Gray, Denis Gray
- Genre: Punk rock, rock and roll, garage rock
- Country of origin: Australia
- Location: Canberra
- Official website: viciouskittenrecords.com

Vicious Kitten Records is an independent Australian record label founded in 1999 by brothers Colin and Denis Gray. Based in Canberra, the label earned a reputation for championing underground punk, garage rock, and rock and roll artists from both Australia and overseas.

Formed after the demise of the music fanzine Vicious Kitten—also launched by the Grays—the label helped to spotlight cult musicians and lesser-known acts, especially those in the punk and underground rock scenes. In the early days of the label, a print newsletter titled Cat Scratch Fever was also produced. Copies of both Vicious Kitten fanzine and Cat Scratch Fever are held with The National Library of Australia.

The launch of the label was mentioned by journalist Vince Lovegrove in his UK-based news column Lovegrove's Ear On London.

After a hiatus of several years, during which the brothers focused on music blogs and producing The Australian Rock Show podcast, the label was relaunched in 2021.

In August 2023, the Gray brothers were interviewed on the *Endless Summer* radio show broadcast on the FREIRAD station in Austria.

Notable artists on the label include Kevin K, Nikki Sudden, The Ballbusters, and The Golden Arms.

== Notable releases ==
Among the label’s most significant releases are:

- Red Brocade by Nikki Sudden
- Tonight We Ride! – a bootleg live album featuring Hitmen DTK with guest guitarist Deniz Tek. For the week beginning 11 March 2024, the album debuted at No. 7 on the 100% Independent Albums chart published by the Australian Recording Industry Association (ARIA). The long-lost recording was unearthed and officially released by Vicious Kitten Records in 2024. It received positive critical response, including reviews from Loud Mag and I-94 Bar.
- Rock 'N' Roll War (An International Collection of Rock 'N' Roll Action) a compilation album released in 2000. The album features a diverse lineup of artists, including The Dictators, Sylvain Sylvain (New York Dolls), Deniz Tek (Radio Birdman), Jeff Dahl, Peter Wells (Rose Tattoo), and Hitmen DTK. A second volume, *Rock 'N' Roll War Volume II*, was released in 2002 through Vicious Kitten USA, a subsidiary label based in Boston, featuring artists such as Cheetah Chrome (Dead Boys), Jeff Crane, Walter Lure (The Heartbreakers), Dave Kusworth (Jacobites), The Streetwalkin' Cheetahs, Michael Thimren (ex-Johnny Thunders), and The Bullys.
- Calling from Nowhereland (Live in Vancouver 1994) a live album by Pillbox NYC, released in October 2025. It was originally recorded on cassette at The Town Pump and also includes a set of rare 1992 demos. A review on the online music site Veglam noted that Pillbox NYC "was the real deal!"
- Multiple albums by American underground rocker Kevin K, including Magic Touch, Shadow Work 38, Cadallac Man, 13th Street and Broken.
- GRRRR!! the second studio album by Melbourne outfit Girl Monstar, who reunited in 2025

== Discography ==
Cat. No.	Year	Artist	Title	Format
VKR 001	1999	Sheek The Shayk	I Want Her So Bad	7", EP
VKR 002	1999	Freddy Lynxx & The Corner Gang	Have Faith	7"
VKR 003	1999	Kevin K Band	Midnight Dragon	7"
VKR 004	1999	Nikki Sudden	Red Brocade	CD, Album
VKR 005	1999	Rick Blaze and the Ballbusters	Manhattan Babylon	CD
VKR 006	2000	Kevin K	Magic Touch	CD, Album
VKR 007	2000	The Golden Arms	Oriental Junk Sick	7"
VKR 008	2000	Various Artists	Rock 'N' Roll War (An International Collection Of Rock 'N' Roll Action)	CD, Compilation
VKR 009	2001	The Ballbusters	People's Republic Of Rock And Roll	CD, Album
VKR 010	2001	Kevin K	13 Street	CD, Album
VKR 011	2021	Kevin K and Ricky Rat	Identity Crisis	7"
VKR 012	2022	Aunt Helen	Hey Aunt Helen!	CD
VKR 013	2022	Kevin K	Cadallac Man	CD, Album
VKR 014	2022	The Golden Rat	We Got A Right	CD, Album
VKR 015	2023	Kevin K	Broken	CD, Album
VKR 016	2024	Hitmen D.T.K. with Deniz Tek	Tonight We Ride! (Official Bootleg Release Live In Sydney: 13 November 1991)	CD, Album
VKR 017	2024	Kevin K and the Bowery Kats	Rosewood	CD, Album
VKR 017LP	2026	Kevin K and the Bowery Kats	Rosewood	LP, Album, Lathe Cut
VKR 018	2024	The Ballbusters	Keepin’ Up With The Jones	7", 33⅓ RPM, EP
VKR 019	2025	Kevin K and the Bowery Kats	Shadow Work 38	CD, Album, Digipak
VKR 019LP	2025	Kevin K and the Bowery Kats	Shadow Work 38	LP, Album, Lathe Cut
VKR 020	2026	Girl Monstar	GRRRR!!	CD, Album, Digipak
VKR 021	2025	Pillbox NYC	Calling from Nowhereland (Live in Vancouver 1994)	CD, Album, Digipak
VKR 022	2026	Kevin K and the Bowery Kats	More	CD, Album
VKR 022LP	2026	Kevin K and the Bowery Kats	More	LP, Album, Lathe Cut

== See also ==
- List of record labels
- Independent music
- Punk rock
- List of record labels: R–Z
