= The Helicopters =

South African Pop Rock Band

The Helicopters were a South African pop rock band active in the 1980s. They formed in 1981 in Vereeniging and were stylistically similar to the new wave bands Duran Duran and A Flock of Seagulls. Benjy Mudie signed the group to Warner Bros. Records in 1984, where they released one album and several singles; in 1987 they moved to Epic and released a second full-length before disbanding. The band scored several hit singles in South Africa, including "Mysteries and Jealousy". The group was a popular concert draw, able to fill stadiums in its home country.

After the band's breakup, lead singer Bernard Binns moved to England, where he has released several solo albums.

== Discography ==
Albums

- Love Attack (1985, WEA)
1. Mysteries and Jealousies – 4:15
2. In Love – 3:32
3. Don't Vanish, It's a Love Attack – 3:33
4. Night Vision Girl – 3:46
5. Say That Again – 2:56
6. Come and Dance – 3:26
7. Kissing For Pleasure – 3:40
8. Only For You – 4:05
9. Miles Apart – 4:45
10. Chased – 3:11
- In the Flesh (1987, Epic)
1. Television – 6:14
2. Western Skies – 4:46
3. In the Flesh – 4:43
4. Hi-Tech Man – 3:42
5. Whisper Your Secret – 4:34
6. Terror in the Attic – 5:27
7. Yesterday Was Never – 4:16
8. Television Part II – 1:04
- What Affair EP (1988, Gallo)
- The Best of The Helicopters (2002, RetroFresh)

Singles

- "Flying High" (Klingel, 1981)
- "Mysteries and Jealousy" (Warner, 1984)
- "Miles and Miles Apart" (Warner, 1984)
- "Kissing For Pleasure" (Warner, 1984)
- "Only for You" (Warner, 1985)
- "Come and Dance" (Warner, 1985)
- "I Wanna Live in Hollywood" (Warner, 1986)
- "Whisper Your Secret" (1987, Epic)
