= Sherry Rich =

Australian alternative country singer-songwriter

- Sherry Rich performing at the Bridge Hotel, Rozelle in May 1995

Background information
- Also known as: Sherry Valier; Sherry Rich Plant
- Born: Sherry Leanne Rich; Lismore, New South Wales, Australia
- Origin: Melbourne, Victoria, Australia
- Genres: Pop; rock; folk; alt country
- Occupations: Singer-songwriter; teacher
- Instruments: Vocals; guitar; bass guitar; harmonica; ukulele
- Years active: 1994–present
- Labels: Rubber; BMG; Vitamin
- Website: sherryrich.com

Sherry Rich or Sherry Rich-Plant is an Australian alternative country singer-songwriter, guitarist and music teacher. As Sherry Valier, she formed an all-girl garage rock band, Girl Monstar (1988–93), on lead vocals, harmonica and rhythm guitar. She has worked as a solo artist fronting Sherry Rich and the Grievous Angels (1994–96), The Rich Family with her mother Noelene Rich, brother Rusty and husband Rick Plant, and a member of various ensembles including the Grapes (1997–2004, 2009–13), a duo with Ashley Naylor; the Mudcakes (2004–present), a children's music group with her husband.

== Early life and education ==
Rich was born in Lismore, New South Wales and raised on Bribie Island, situated off the coast of Queensland, and nearby Caboolture, with her brother, Russell Rich (a.k.a. Rusty Berther). Their mother, Noelene Rich, was a country music artist during the early 1960s; she had appeared on radio and television and toured supporting Reg Lindsay.

Whilst attending high school, Rich played bass guitar in a band, Obscure Alternatives – named after an album by United Kingdom pop outfit, Japan. The group included Rusty and Keith Urban. They performed at the Bribie Island Festival and also at the Caboolture State High School Social. During her tertiary education Rich (with Rusty), formed a Brisbane-based country, rockabilly outfit, Cactus Fever (1986-7). They were popular on the local live circuit and undertook a one-off tour to Sydney supporting the Johnnys.

== Career ==
Rich relocated to Melbourne in 1988 and as Sherry Valier on lead vocals, harmonica and rhythm guitar, she formed an all-girl garage rock band, Girl Monstar, with Damian Child on bass guitar and vocals; Anne McCue on lead guitar and vocals and Ritchie Hine on drums. Girl Monstar (1988–93) developed a presence on the indie music scene. Rich wrote two of their singles, "Surfin' on a Wave of Love" (October 1989) and "Joe Cool" (June 1990), which both topped the Australian indie charts. They released an album, Monstereo Delicio (1992), before splitting in early 1993.

After leaving Girl Monstar, Rich focused on her solo career and formed a backing band, the Grievous Angels, in 1994 with Steve Connolly on lead guitar (ex-Paul Kelly and the Coloured Girls/Messengers), Matt Heydon on keyboards (ex-Nick Barker and the Reptiles), Steve Morrison on drums and Douglas Robertson on bass guitar (ex-Ice Cream Hands). They released an extended play, Sherry Rich and the Grievous Angels in January 1995 via Rubber Records with Charlie Owen on guitar (ex-New Christs, Tex, Don and Charlie) and Jen Anderson on violin (ex-the Black Sorrows) joining. Trying to Write a Love Song, their second EP, followed in January 1996.

Rich gained a following in the mid-1990s – as the new country genre reached a wider audience, touring much of east coast Australia including a spot at Tamworth. Her debut album, Sherry Rich & Courtesy Move (October 1997), was recorded in Nashville earlier that year, with three members of alt rockers, Wilco, working under the name, Courtesy Move: Jay Bennett on lead guitar and producer, Ken Coomer on drums and John Stirratt on bass guitar. A single, "Polite Kisses", from the album was issued in August. Daniel Aloi of Consummable opined "she made a pop-meets-country debut album that blows away, aesthetically at least, the current crop of stars with big hits and big hair." He observed while "Bar-hopping with the band [in Nashville] and in Chicago between rehearsals and recording sessions, she cemented a landmark collaboration on a par with that of Linda Ronstadt and the fledgling Eagles."

Rich worked as a singer-songwriter in Nashville from 1998 to 2008. Song writing collaborators include Paul Kelly, Michael Thomas, Walt Wilkins, Gwil Owen, Bob DiPiero, Bennett, Dan Brodie, Tim Carroll, Tammy Rogers, Amy Rigby, Will Kimbrough, Jim Lauderdale and Garth Porter.

Rich teamed up with Ashley Naylor on guitar from Melbourne band, Even, to form a psych folk pop duo, the Grapes, and they released a self-titled album in 1999. In 2000 she released an album of country cover versions with her husband, Rick Plant, her mother, Noelene, and her brother, Rusty Berther, of Scared Weird Little Guys under the name 'The Rich Family'.

Rich returned to live in Melbourne in 2006 and released three children's albums as The Mudcakes, collaborating with her husband Rick.

In 2012, Rich released the album, Dakota Avenue, composed of material recorded in 1999–2001 in Chicago, with Bennett. The album was selected as Radio Australia's Album of the Week in August 2012. Dakota Avenue was also nominated for 'Best Album' in the 2012 EG Music Awards, which are the largest reader-voted music awards in Australia. Rich was also nominated under the 'Best Female Artists' category. In July 2013, Rich appeared as the Guest Artist on the Australian TV program Rockwiz.

In 2017, Rich completed a Creative Arts Industries Degree at Victoria University.

== Discography ==
=== Albums ===
List of albums with selected details
| Title | Details |
|---|---|
| Sherry Rich & Courtesy Move | Released: October 1997; Label: Rubber, BMG Australia (74321517542); Format: CD |
| Dakota Avenue | Released: 2012; Label: Pandora Mink Records; Format: CD, digital |
| The Divine Crimson V | Released: August 2021; Label: Sherry Rich (CAT 999); Format: LP (100 copies), digital |

=== Extended plays ===
List of EPs with selected details
| Title | Details |
|---|---|
| Sherry Rich & The Grievous Angels | Released: 1995; Label: Rubber (RUB 038); Format: CD |
| Trying to Write a Love Song | Released: 1996; Label: Rubber; Format: CD |

== Awards and nominations ==
=== EG Awards / Music Victoria Awards ===
The EG Awards (known as Music Victoria Awards since 2013) are an annual awards night celebrating Victorian music. They commenced in 2006.

| Year | Nominee / work | Award | Result | Ref. |
|---|---|---|---|---|
| 2012 | Dakota Avenue | Best Album | Nominated | |
| 2012 | Sherry Rich | Best Female | Nominated | |
| 2022 | Sherry Rich | Best Country Work | Nominated | |
