= East of Electric =

2008 Anne McCue Album

Studio album by Anne McCue
- Released: 2008
- Genre: Alternative country
- Label: self-released

Anne McCue chronology
| Koala Motel (2006) | East of Electric (2008) | Broken Promise Land (2010) |

East of Electric is the fifth album by Nashville-based Australian alternative country musician Anne McCue. It was self-released in 2008.

== Track listing ==
1. "Too Late for Love"
2. "All I Need (Don't Try)"
3. "Love's Not Passing Us By"
4. "We Are The Same"
5. "Psychadelica II"
6. "Money in the Morning"
7. "Beautiful Thing"
8. "Do It The Right Way"
9. "Straight to the Heart"
10. "Say Bye Bye"
11. "East of Electric"
