= Joann Formosa =

Australian equestrian

Joann Formosa OAM
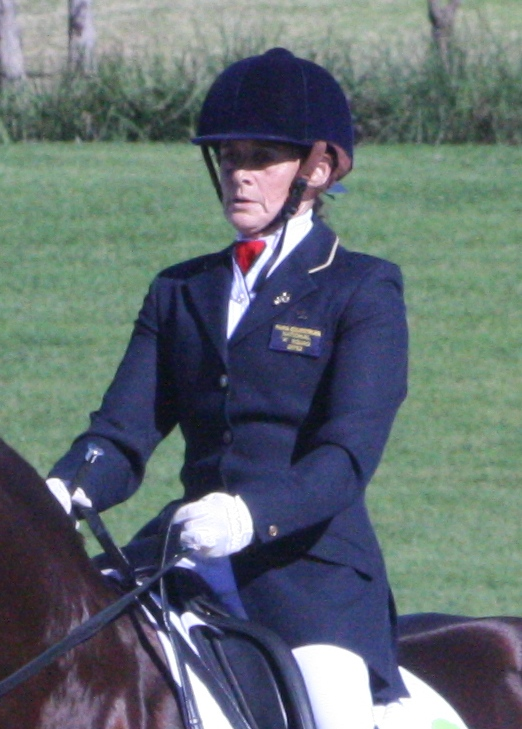
- Formosa on the field in 2012

Personal information
- Nationality: Australian
- Born: 19 February 1961 (age 65)

Sport
- Country: Australia
- Sport: Equestrian
Medal record
Equestrian
Paralympic Games
Gold medal – first place	2012 London	Mixed Dressage - Championship grade Ib

Joann Formosa (born 19 February 1961) is an Australian Para-equestrian, who won a gold medal at the 2012 London Paralympics.

== Personal ==
Joann Helen Formosa was born on 19 February 1961, and is from Broadford in central Victoria. She attended university, where she studied art.

Formosa has spinal cord and nerve damage, caused by an accident following an attempt to open a gate while she was riding a horse. She can walk with the aid of crutches, though she is not self-sufficient, and requires assistance from nursing staff at Mitchell Community Health Services. She has severe allergies to substances including horse feed and hay.

== Equestrian ==
Formosa started competing in equestrian in 1980. Before her accident, she competed in dressage and show jumping events. She helped found Kilmore Adult Riding Club, the first adult pony club in her region.

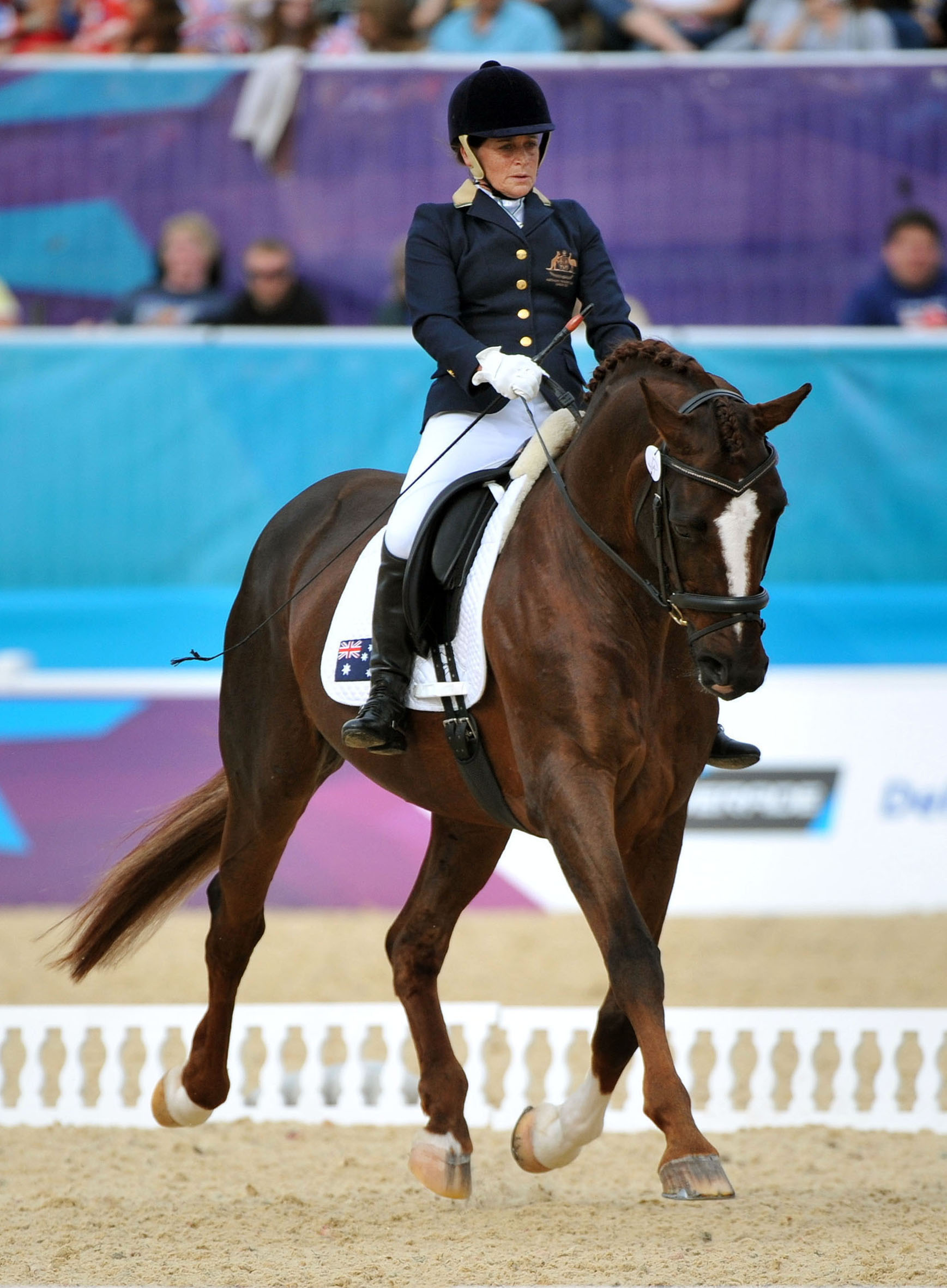
Formosa at the 2012 London Paralympics

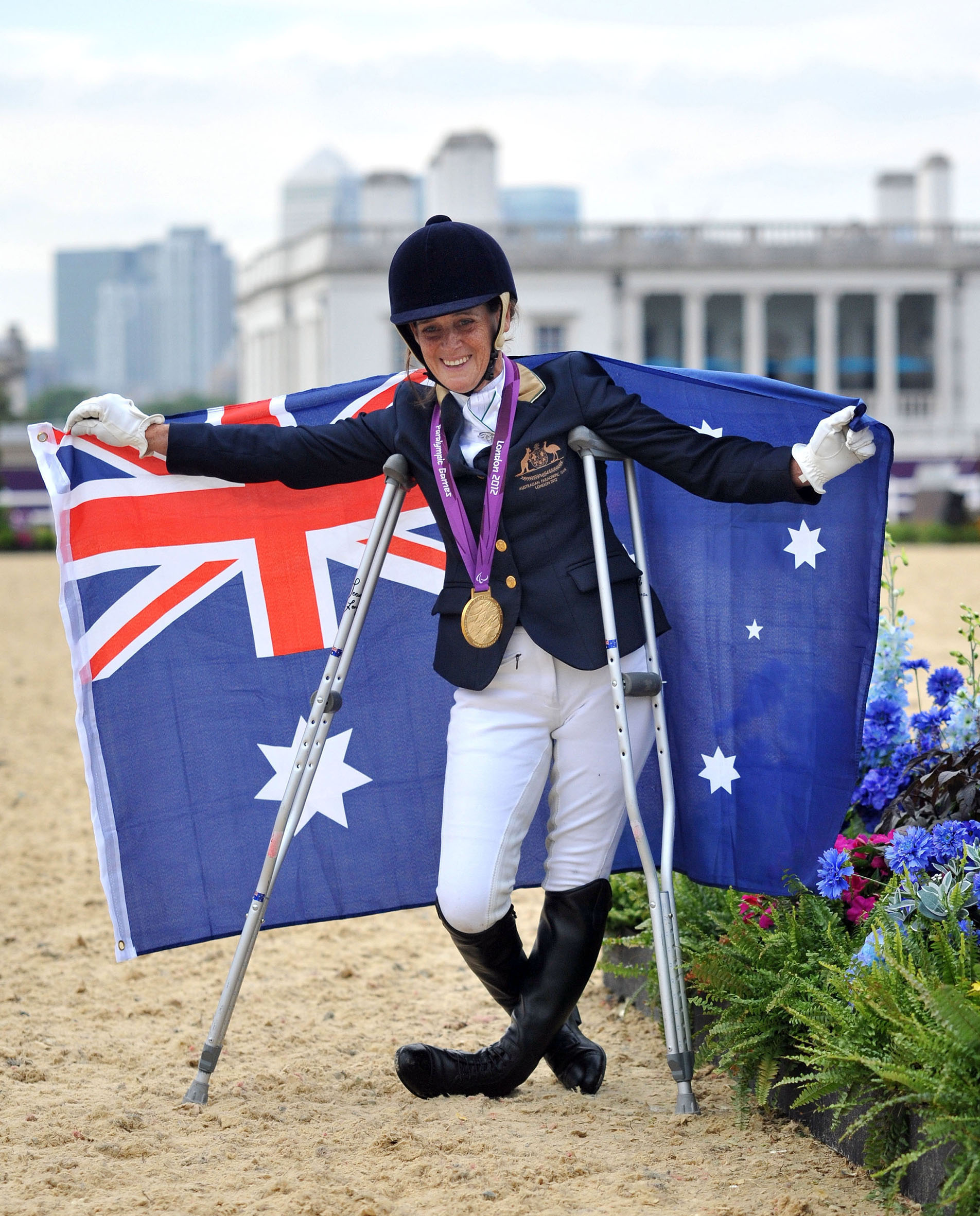
Formosa wearing her gold medal at the 2012 London Paralympics

Formosa is a Grade 1B equestrian dressage competitor. As a competitor in this class, she is required to perform a "dressage test involving medium to collected walk, a quarter walk pirouette and a long rein walk, as well as working trot and lengthening in the trot." She competes without stirrups as she does not have enough leg control to justify them. She has been coached by Manuela McLeans since 2011. She is a member of Riding for the Disabled Victoria, and is based at the Australian Equine Behaviour Centre at Clonbinane. As of 2012, she has a scholarship with the Victorian Institute of Sport.

At the 2006 Victorian State Dressage Championships, Formosa finished first in the Grade 1B event while riding Greenhill Chromes Reflection. She competed in the 2006 World Equestrian Games, where she made her national team debut and competed in her first competition outside Australia. After returning from this competition, Formosa had an accident while riding her horse. She was a member of Australia's 2009 National High Performance Squad. In 2009, she competed in the Australian Masters Game. She finished first in the 2011 National Championship in the Grade 1B category. At the Victorian-hosted 2011 Oceania Championships, she won two gold medals. At the 2012 London Paralympics, she won a gold medal in the Mixed Dressage - Championship grade Ib event. She qualified on Worldwide PB, a "former Wanganui-owned Hanoverian stallion" that she acquired in December 2011.

== Recognition ==
In November 2013, Formosa was awarded the Federation Equestre Internationale (FEI) Against All Odds award. She was awarded an Order of Australia Medal in the 2014 Australia Day Honours "for service to sport as a Gold Medallist at the London 2012 Paralympic Games."
