= Rob Oakley (equestrian) =

Australian equestrian (born 1962)

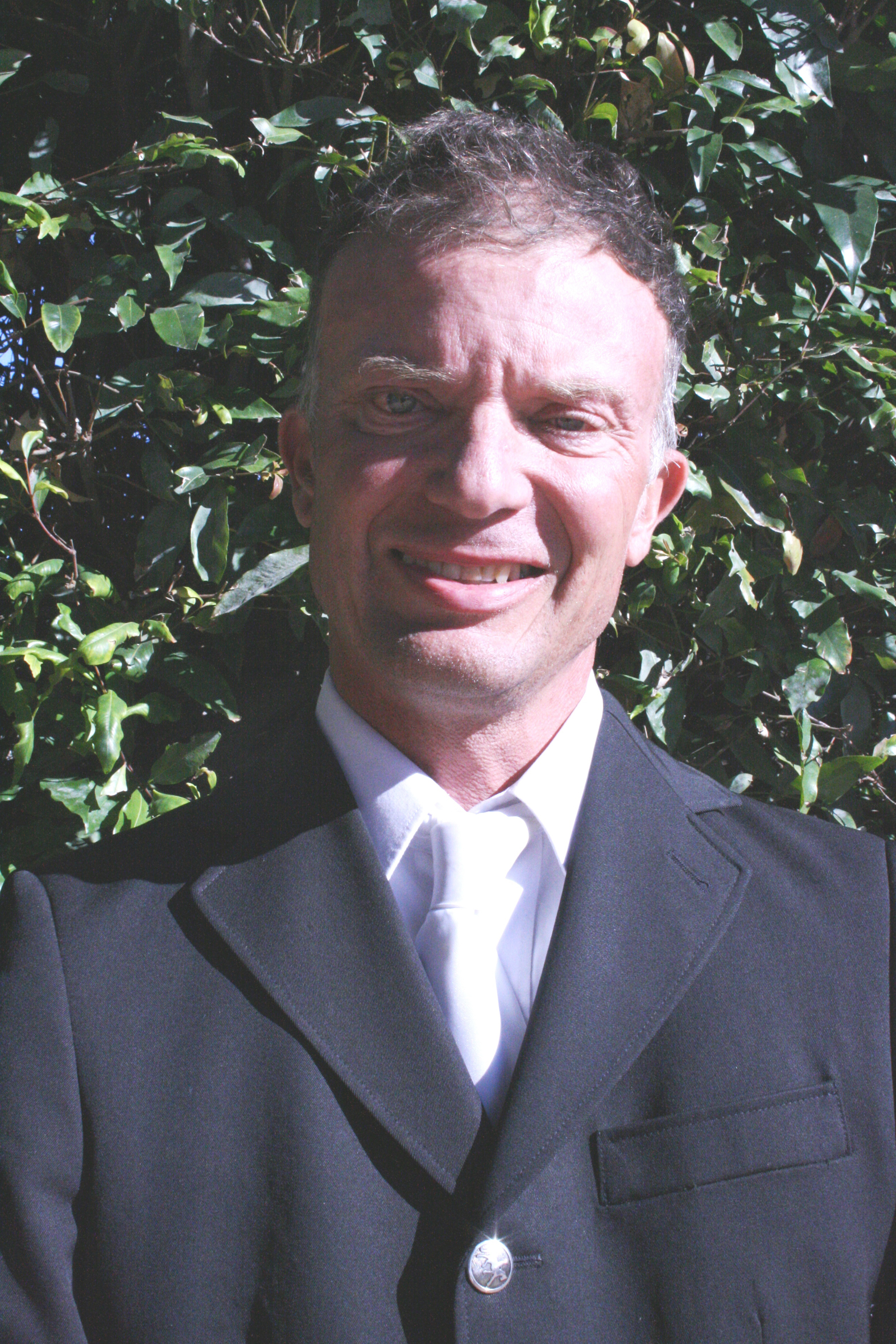
- Portrait of Australian Paralympic equestrian Oakley in 2012

Personal information
- Nationality: Australian
- Born: 18 April 1962 (age 64)

Sport
- Country: Australia
- Sport: Equestrian

Rob Oakley (born 18 April 1962) is an Australian equestrian. He represented Australia in equestrian at the 2012 Summer Paralympics but did not medal.

== Personal ==
Oakley was born on 18 April 1962 in Primrose Valley, New South Wales. He has muscular dystrophy. In 2007, he was based in the Australian Capital Territory. In 2012, he lived in Bungendore and had two teenage daughters.

== Equestrian ==
Oakley is a Grade 1B equestrian competitor. As of 2012, his coach is Jose Mendez and his groom is Faye Mendez, and he trained in Marulan, New South Wales. He has been involved with horse related sport since he was a teenager, starting in the sport as a way to impress a girl. In 2011 and 2012, he had a scholarship with the ACT Academy of Sport.

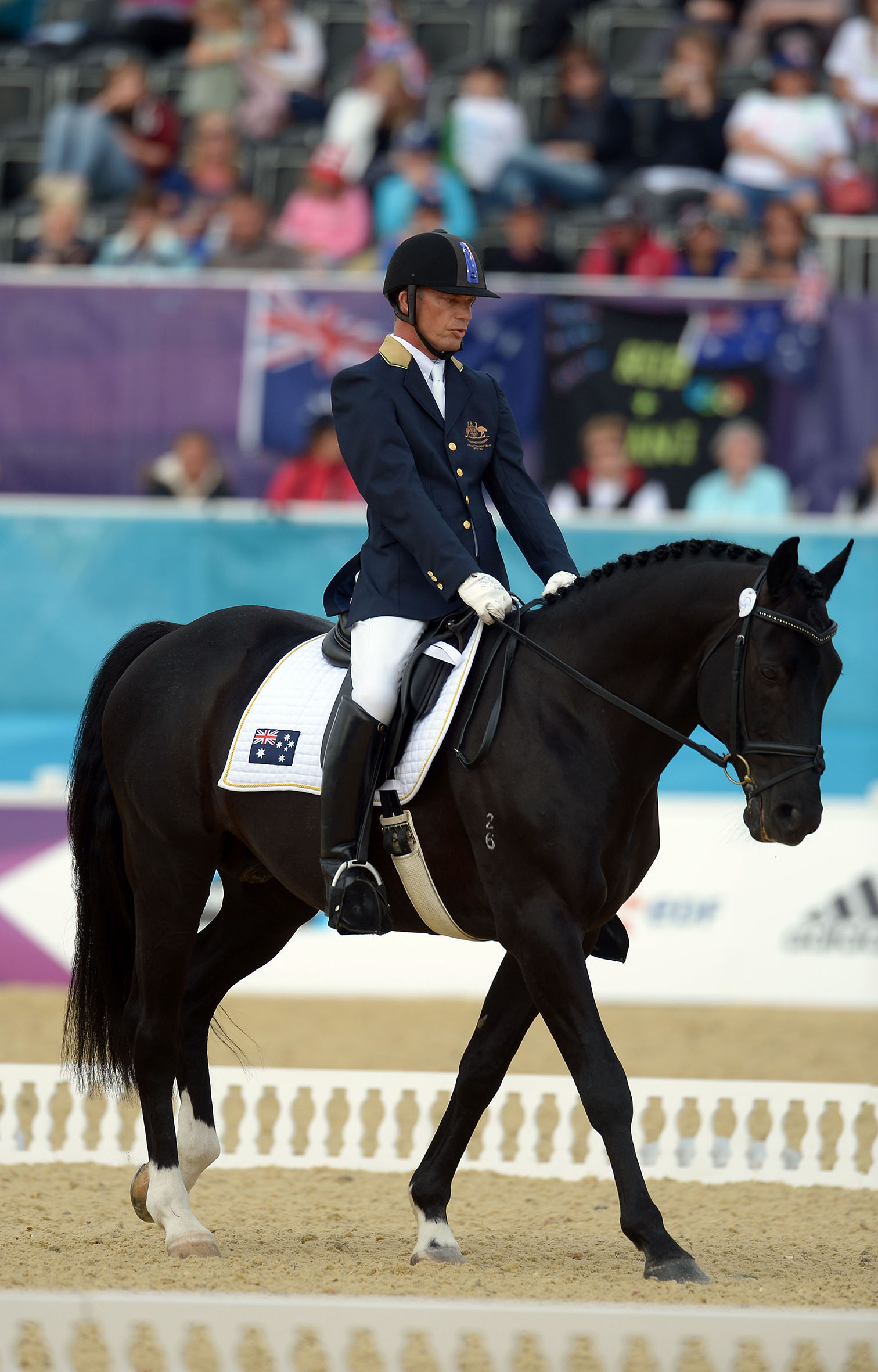
Oakley at the 2012 London Paralympics

Initially, before the onset of muscular dystrophy, Oakley played polocrosse. He started doing dressage in 2002. He first represented Australia in 2005. That year, he finished first at the International Derby in the United Kingdom and second at the Hartpury International Festival of Dressage. He competed at the Hartpury International Festival of Dressage again in 2006. In December 2006, he acquired a 17 hands high horse called Peaceful Warrior. In 2007, 2008 and 2012, he trained and volunteered at the Pegasus Riding for the Disabled Centre in Canberra. In late 2007, he was attempting to get horse flu vaccinations for his two horses because he believed if he did not get them, his chances of making the Paralympic team would be diminished. In 2007, he was a member of Australia's dressage shadow Paralympic team and competed in the World Championships. In April 2008, he was one of three riders trying to earn Australia's fifth and final spot on the country's 2008 Summer Paralympic team. He did not get selected. He was a member of Australia's 2009 National High Performance Squad. At the 2011 Oceania Championships, he finished second in the team and individual events. He was selected to represent Australia at the 2012 Summer Paralympics in equestrian riding Statford Manny Mantivani as a fifty-year-old. He did not medal at the 2012 Games.
