= Rosalie Fahey =

Australian equestrian

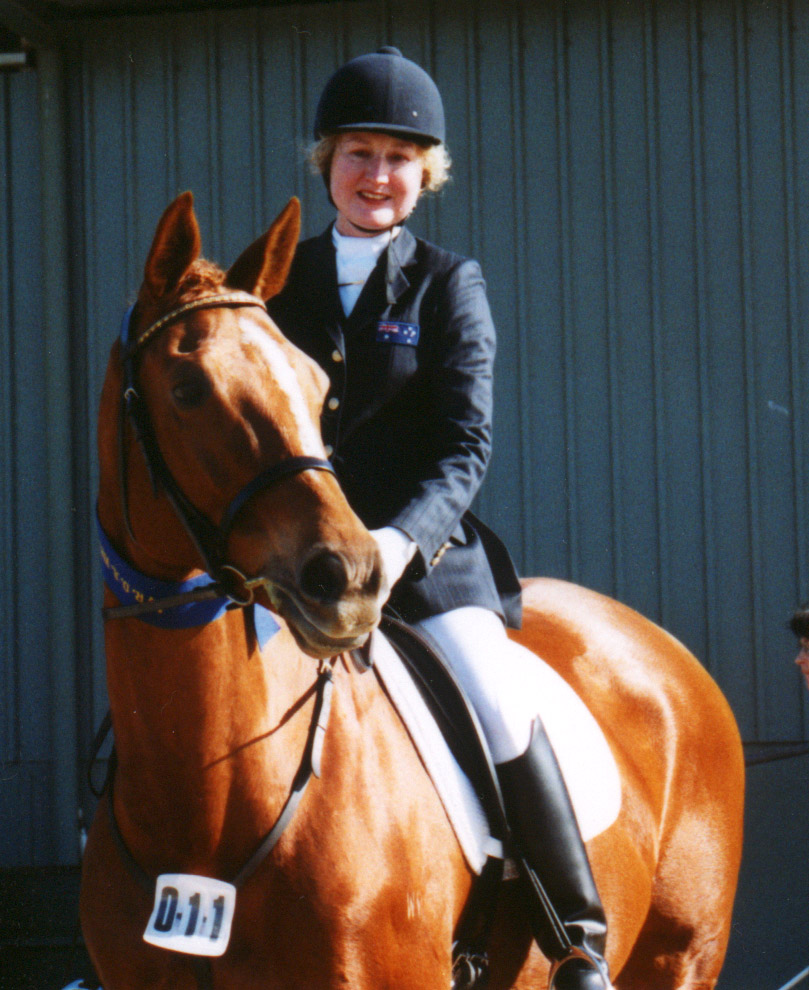

Personal information
- Nationality: Australia
- Born: Adelaide, South Australia
Medal record
Para equestrian
Representing Australia
Paralympic Games
Bronze medal – third place	2000 Sydney	Mixed Dressage; Championship grade I

Rosalie Fahey is a Paralympic equestrian competitor from Australia. She won a bronze medal at the 2000 Sydney Games in the Mixed Dressage – Championship grade I event.

== Personal ==
Fahey was born in Adelaide, South Australia. From as long as she can remember, Fahey loved horses but was not given opportunity to begin riding until the age of 11 when she was given her first horse. She then went on to join the Pony Club in Adelaide, competing in eventing, dressage and show jumping. Since the age of twelve Fahey has had serious Crohn's disease but continued to ride until her early 20s, until complications, caused her to be hospitalised for 9 months. After multiple surgeries she developed a subsequent muscle myopathy which resulted in her being in a wheelchair for a time and for eight years Fahey was forced to give up riding. Prior to the onset of the muscle myopathy, Fahey had been a professional dancer. During her years of forced retirement from riding, Fahey studied music and teaching at the University of Melbourne. She then went on to become a teacher and professional musician – mastering twelve instruments. Fahey was inspired, from a very young age, to represent Australia at the Olympic Games after being told of a relative, John Fahey, who represented Australia in show jumping at the 1964 and 1968 Olympics. After struggles with significant illness and disability Fahey changed her lifelong directional plans and instead of becoming an Olympian, she says she became "a very proud Australian Paralympian".

== Sporting career ==
In 2000, at the 2000 Summer Paralympics Fahey won bronze in the mixed dressage championship grade 1 and also competed in both the mixed dressage freestyle grade 1 and team open where Australia placed in overall fifth position. Fahey competed at the 2003 World Cup in Belgium, placing seventh in the Individual Grade 1b Para Equestrian Dressage and competed as a member of the Australian team. In 2008, she sustained severe spinal injuries as a result of a show jumping accident. Fahey went on to win silver in the Canadian FEI 3* in 2010. In 2011, Oceania FEI 3* Fahey won the gold medal on a last minute "catch ride" (Sienna Taylor Made loaned by Morgan Webb Liddle) after her own horse was scratched on the first day of competition. This competition was held in conjunction with the Saddleworld Dressage Festival.
