= Sharon Jarvis =

Australian para-equestrian (born 1978)

Sharon Jarvis OAM
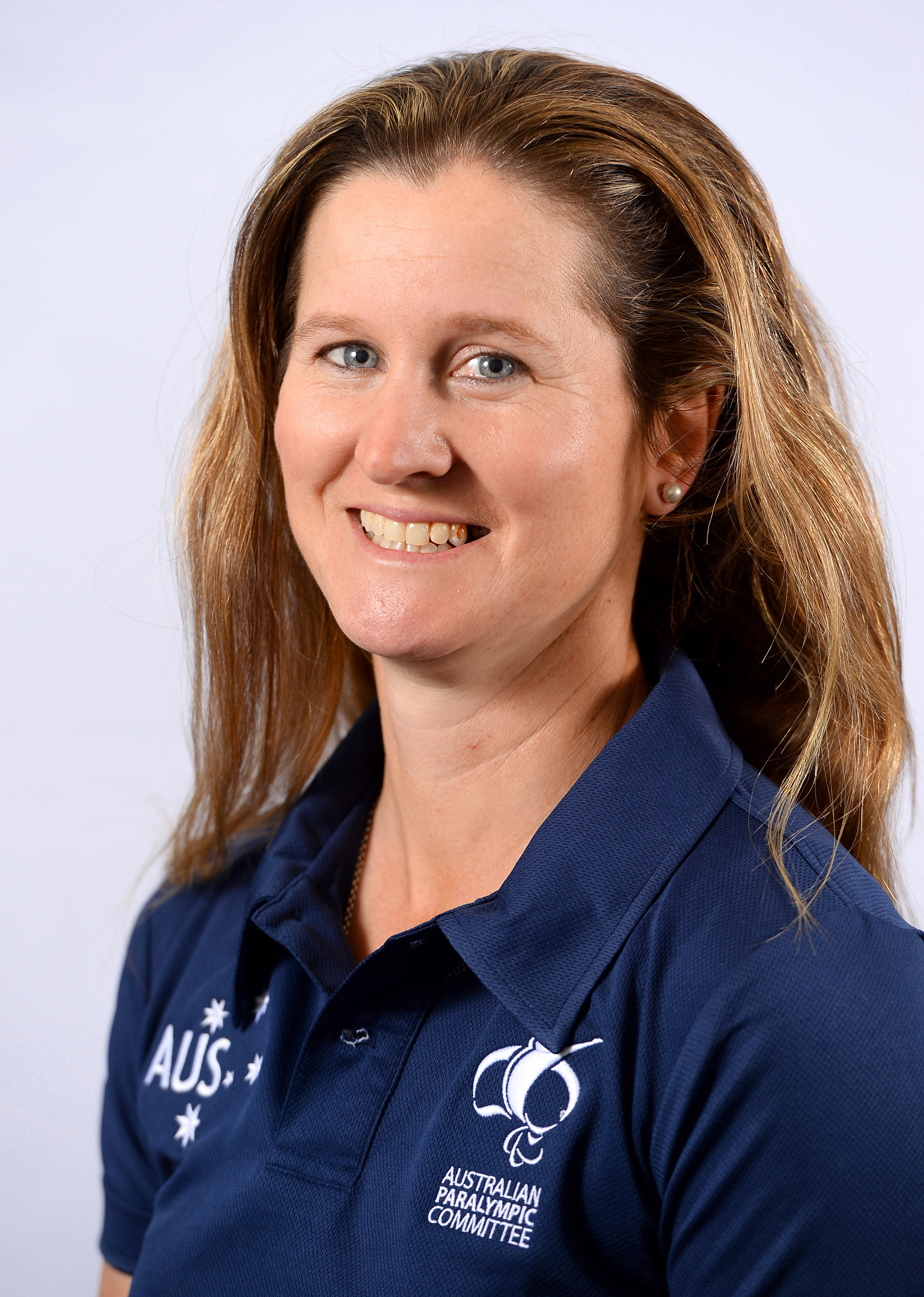
- 2016 Australian Paralympic team portrait

Personal information
- Born: 31 October 1978 (age 47)

Sport
- Country: Australia
- Sport: Para-equestrian
Medal record
Equestrian
World Equestrian Games
Bronze medal – third place	2010 Kentucky	Individual Test Grade III
Bronze medal – third place	2010 Kentucky	Freestyle Test Grade III

Sharon Jarvis (born 31 October 1978) is an Australian para-equestrian. She represented Australia at the three Summer Paralympics - 2008 Beijing, 2016 Rio and 2020 Tokyo .

== Personal ==
Jarvis was born on 31 October 1978. At the age of seven, she was diagnosed with bone cancer (Ewing sarcoma) in her left femur and given an only 20 per cent chance of surviving. She survived the cancer through twelve months of chemotherapy and radiation therapy but a year later broke the same leg affected by cancer. This led to numerous operations and skin grafts and as a result she has severely limited movement on her left side. She operates a pony stud called Applewood in Donnybrook, Western Australia.

== Equestrian ==
Jarvis began riding at the age of three and her parents purchased her a pony when she was four. In 2006, she competed in her first para-equestrian event and is classed as a Grade III rider. Her first international event was the 2007 FEI World Para Dressage Championships in England where she finished sixth and eight. At the 2008 Beijing Paralympics, she finished fourth in the Mixed Dressage – Championship grade III, seventh in the Mixed Dressage – Freestyle grade III and sixth in the Mixed Dressage Team Open. Jarvis won bronze medals in the individual test and freestyle test events at the 2010 World Equestrian Games at Lexington, Kentucky. She was unable to attend the 2012 London Paralympics and 2014 World Equestrian Games due to transportation and horse injury problems.

At the 2016 Rio Paralympics, she rode Ceasy, a 9-year-old Dutch Warmblood mare. In the lead up to Rio she has been assisted by the Western Australian Institute of Sport. She finished ninth in the Individual Championship Test Grade III and 15th in the Dressage Individual Team Test Grade III and was a member of the Australian team that finished ninth in the Team Competition.

At the 2020 Tokyo Paralympics, Jarvis rode 18-year-old gelding Romanos and finished 10th in the Individual championship test grade III. She was a member of the Australian team competition with Emma Booth and Amelia White that finished thirteenth.

Jarvis has stated that Tokyo 2020 will be her final Paralympics.

== Recognition ==
- 2010 – Equimac Rider of the Year (Australia)
- 2011 – Equestrian Athlete of the Year (Western Australia)
- 2025 - Medal of the Order of Australia (OAM) for service to paralympic equestrian sports.
