= Emma Booth (equestrian) =

Australian para-equestrian

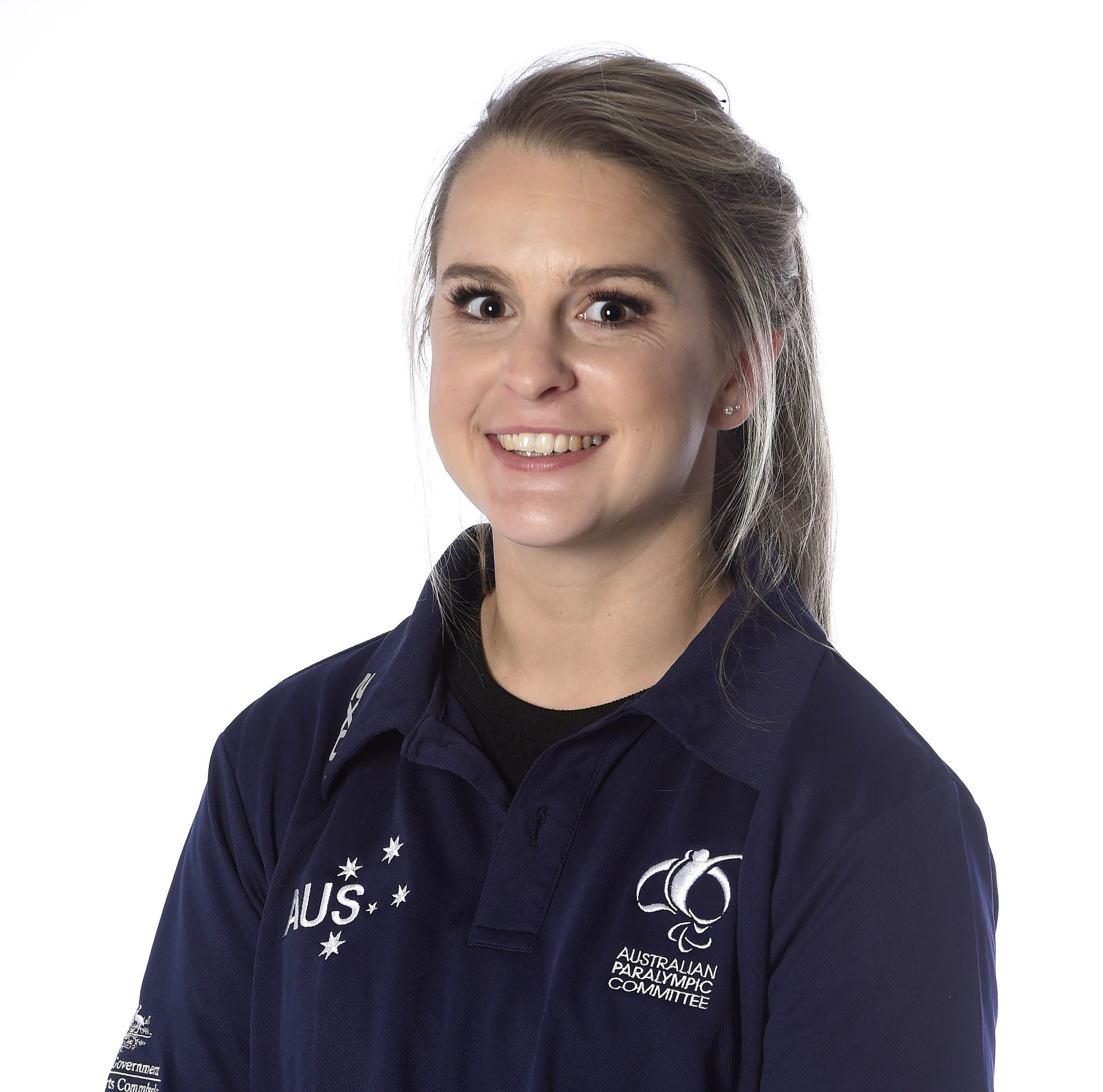

Personal information
- Born: 8 June 1991 (age 35)

Sport
- Country: Australia
- Sport: Equestrian

Emma Booth (born 8 June 1991) is an Australian Paralympic equestrian. She represented Australia at the 2016 Rio Paralympics and the 2020 Tokyo Paralympics.

== Personal ==
Booth was born on 8 June 1991. She lives in Langwarrin, Victoria. On 7 April 2013, she was involved in a car accident on the way back to Melbourne after a competing in the Albury Horse Trials with her friend Courtney Fraser. A truck jackknifed and hit two cars. The woman driving one of the cars was killed, as were Fraser's two horses in the float that her car was towing. Both Fraser and Booth suffered near fatal injuries. Besides head, abdominal and leg injuries, Booth's spinal cord was damaged and she was left a paraplegic, from the L2 vertebra. Fraser suffered a fractured knee cap, ribs and sternum. They were treated at Royal Melbourne Hospital.

== Equestrian ==
Booth's riding career began at a young age with ponies. At the age of eleven, she won a competition on The Saddle Club and the prize was a horse with the expenses fully paid for a year. She called her horse Zidane. In 2011, she moved to Germany to work with international dressage rider Holger Schulze in riding and training his horses. Seven months after her accident in 2013, she returned to riding with the aim of competing in the Paralympics. She uses a whip and voice commands to guide the horse's movements. Her international debut was at the 2014 CPEID3* in Hartpury, England, where she finished fifth twice and sixth. She was a reserve rider for the Australian team at the 2014 World Equestrian Games.

At the 2016 Rio Paralympics, she rode Danish-bred horse called Zidane. She finished fifth in the Individual Championship Test Grade II and 13th in the Dressage Individual Team Test Grade II and member of the Australian team that finished ninth in the Team Competition.

At the 2020 Tokyo Paralympics, she rode Mogelvangs Zidane and finished eighth in the Individual Championship Test Grade II and fifth in the Dressage Individual Team Test Grade II. She was a member of the Australian team together with Amelia White and Sharon Jarvis that finished 13th in the Team Competition.
