= Amelia White (equestrian) =

Australian equestrian (born 1992)

Personal information
- Full name: Amelia Antje White
- Born: 16 February 1992 (age 34) Camperdown, NSW Australia

Sport
- Country: Australia
- Sport: Para-equestrian
- Event: Para Dressage
- Coached by: Helen Langehanenberg

Achievements and titles
- Paralympic finals: Tokyo 2020

Amelia White (born 16 February 1992) is an Australian para-equestrian. She represented Australia at the 2020 Tokyo Paralympics.

== Personal ==
White was born on 16 February 1992. She was born and raised in Sydney before moving west to a cattle farm during her teenage years. In 2010, she was involved in a near-fatal head-on motor vehicle accident, where her car was hit by another car that was mistakenly on her side of the road. The accident left her with a broken left foot, broken left ankle, compound fractures of the tibia and fibula, shattered left and right knee caps, broken femur, broken hip, broken ribs, broken collarbone, broken wrist, nose and six vertebrae in her spine. She further had internal injuries, resulting in a damaged kidney, hematoma and extensive scarring. The injuries led to "a loss of movement and feeling in my left leg, knee, ankle and foot due to nerve damage, steel plates/pins and issues with tendons" and '"reduced range of motion and feeling in my right wrist, which also has some steel pins, reduced mobility in my right shoulder, as well as issues with my spine due to the broken vertebrae". The recovery was extensive, requiring multiple surgeries and rehabilitation.

In 2018, she has completed a bachelor's degree in Law and a bachelor's degree in Criminology, graduating with Honours at University of New England. In 2020, she graduated with a Masters in Law specialising in International Criminal Law and in 2021, completed a Diploma of Legal Practice with a Distinction+ average. In 2023, she started a second Masters in Law at the Frankfurt School of Finance and Management, specialising in Mergers and Acquisitions. She now works in Germany as a corporate lawyer, specialising in international M&A transactions.

She holds dual citizenships with Australia and Germany and is fluent in both English and German. White also gained her student pilot's licence at the age of 15, intent on becoming a fighter pilot with the RAAF. This dream was cut short after a riding fall in 2008 left her in a coma with permanent brain damage, during which White says she lost her ability to do complex mathematical calculations and could no longer pursue her dream of flying full time, though she still flies recreationally.

== Equestrian ==
White commenced riding at the age of eight. She competed around Sydney and greater NSW in Equestrian Showjumping and Eventing. White won her first Eventing start in 2008, with Roma Point, finishing on their dressage score of 27.4.

After her motor vehicle accident, she was encouraged to take up para equestrian by Olympian Megan Jones. She is classified as Grade V. Her first para competition was in 2015. She moved to Germany in 2015 and is based at the stable of German dressage rider Helen Langehanenberg.

In February 2021, White and her horse Genius 60, a 10-year-old Dutch warmblood gelding, won the CPEDI3* Dressage freestyle competition at Al Shaqab, Doha with a new personal best of 73.733 percent, after taking second in two other events.

At the 2020 Summer Paralympics, White rode Genius to eighth in the Individual championship test grade V, and sixth in the Dressage individual team test grade V. In the team competition she rode with Emma Booth and Sharon Jarvis. They finished thirteenth.

In 2022, White and Genius were named as the reserve combination for the Australian World Championship Team. Two weeks later at CPEDI Riesenback, the pair placed 2nd in two events and won the Grand Prix B class. White and Genius also set a new personal best in the Para Grand Prix Freestyle, scoring 74.892%.
