= Helicopters (band) =

Australian musical group

- Origin: Perth, Western Australia, Australia
- Genres: New wave, ska
- Years active: 1980–1985
- Label: Warped/Tempo
- Past members: see Members list

Helicopters were an Australian new wave, ska-influenced pop band which formed in Perth in August 1980. They released two albums, a self-titled album in 1982 and a career retrospective, Great Moments in Aviation (1985). Founding mainstays were Deidre Baude (aka Deidre Baude de Bunnetat) on lead vocals and bass guitar; and Kevin Rooney (aka Kevin Kavanah) on drums. The group disbanded in 1985, Baude and Rooney relocated to the United Kingdom.

== History ==
Helicopters, also seen as The Helicopters, were a new wave music group formed in Perth in August 1980 with the line up of Deidre Baude (aka Deidre Baude de Bunnetat) on lead vocals and bass guitar; Kevin Rooney (aka Kevin Kavanah) on drums; and Peter Stafford on lead guitar. In April 1981 Stafford was replaced by Phil Bennett on vocals and keyboards; and Tony Thewlis on guitar. A track, "Tag Along", was included on the West Australian compilation album, West, released by radio station, 96FM, in 1981. Initially the band played cover versions of United Kingdom groups: U2, Altered Images, and Siouxsie and the Banshees.

By September 1981, Thewlis had left to join post-punk group, The Scientists. He was replaced on guitar by George O'Brien (aka George B. Rushmore). The line up of Baude, Bennett, O'Brien and Rooney recorded the band's debut self-titled album, which appeared in 1982. In August O'Brien left and the remaining members took a year off. They formed a side project, a glam rock cover band, Lazer Blades for six months. In early 1983 Helicopters re-formed with Vic Renolds (ex-Change Alley) on guitar and vocals joining Baude, Bennett, and Rooney. They played a harder, though still pop-oriented, sound.

Helicopters were one of Perth's most successful new wave bands, they managed to attract crowds at their own venues, despite the Western Australian capital's reputation as "cover city". They supported visiting artists such as Stray Cats, Elvis Costello and Duran Duran. The group disbanded in 1985 and issued a career retrospective, Great Moments in Aviation. Baude and Rooney moved to the UK, Renolds recorded solo material, while Bennett joined Lick the Lizard, Love Bites and then Pillbox. Rooney briefly joined The Scientists (which had relocated to London), appearing on their 1986-recorded album, Human Jukebox (October 1987) alongside former bandmate Thewlis. A Helicopters' track "Elevator Phobia", written by Baude and Rooney, was compiled on United Rock (1995).

== Members ==
- Deidre Baude (aka Deidre Baude de Bunnetat) – bass guitar, lead vocals (1980–85)
- Kevin Rooney (aka Kevin Kavanah) – drums (1980–85)
- Peter Stafford – lead guitar (1980–81)
- Phil Bennett – keyboards, vocals (1981–85)
- George O'Brien (aka George B. Rushmore) – lead guitar (1981–82)
- Tony Thewlis – lead guitar (1981)
- Vic Renolds – lead guitar, vocals (1983–85)

== Discography ==
- The Helicopters – Warped/Tempo, Home Grown (1982)
- Great Moments in Aviation – self-released cassette (1984)
