= Sue-Ellen Lovett =

Australian para-equestrian (born 1959)

Sue Ellen-Lovett OAM
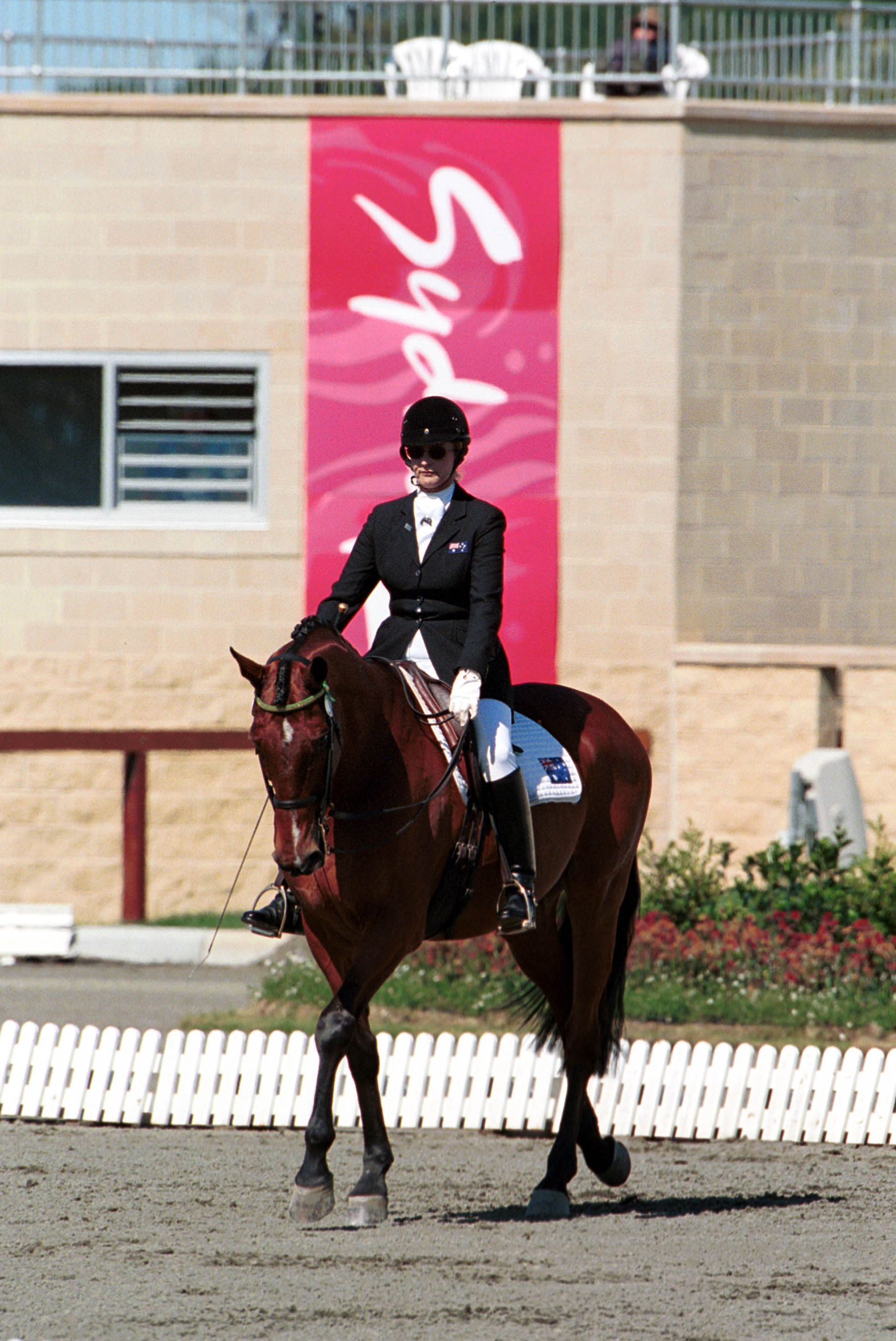
- Sue-Ellen Lovett at 2000 Sydney Paralympics.

Personal information
- Born: 12 October 1959 (age 67) Mudgee, New South Wales

Sport
- Country: Australia
- Sport: Para-equestrian

Sue-Ellen Lovett (née Lee; born 12 October 1959) is an Australian para-equestrian. She represented Australia at the 1996 and 2000 Sydney Paralympics. She has raised over $3 million for Guide Dogs NSW/ACT, cancer and other charities.

== Personal life ==
Lovett was born on 12 October 1959 in Mudgee, New South Wales. She grew up on a 21,000 acre property outside Mudgee in NSW. At the age of 12, she was diagnosed with the hereditary condition retinitis pigmentosa. Her mother Mary had the same eyesight disease. Since 1981, she has used a guide dog. In 1989, she was diagnosed with cervical cancer and underwent three operations. In 2000, she married agricultural teacher, Matthew Lovett, and they live on his family's property outside Dubbo. In 2012, she filed a complaint with the Australian Human Rights Commission after being asked to leave two restaurants and a hotel in Picton because of her guide dog. She is now completely blind.

== Equestrian ==
Lovett grew up riding horses on her family's property. She took up dressage in 1994. At the 1996 Atlanta Summer Paralympics, she finished 13th in the Mixed Dressage Grade IV and 11th in the Mixed Kur Canter Grade IV.

Between 1995 and 2000, she was National RDA Grade 4 Champion. At the 1999 World Dressage Championships in Denmark, she was a member of the Australian team that won the bronze medal.

At the 2000 Sydney Summer Paralympics, she finished eighth Mixed Dressage - Championship Grade IV, fifth in the Mixed Dressage - Freestyle Grade IV and as a member of the Australian team fifth in the Mixed Dressage Team Open. After representing, Australia at the Sydney Paralympics, Lovett turned her focus to able-bodied competition and mentoring successful junior riders. She qualified for the Competition Dressage International in Sydney from 2009 to 2013.

In 2018, she was competing in dressage competitions by using six to eight "living markers" friends and volunteers who call out letters of the alphabet, directing her around the course. In 2018, she was being sponsored by businessman Terry Snow.

== Fund raising ==
In October 2018, she completed her tenth fund raising ride when she rode Australian Stock horses with her guide dog Armani, over more than 800 km, starting in Dubbo then travelling through Central West NSW and finishing at Dubbo Racecourse to raise funds for new Integrated Wellness Centre to be located within the Oncology Department of Dubbo Base Hospital. She has raised over $3 million for Guide Dogs NSW/ACT, cancer and other charities.

== Recognition ==
- 2000 - Life Member of Equestrian Australia
- 2000 - Australian Sports Medal for excellence in dressage competition both in the able bodied field as well as the disabled arena.
- 2024 -Medal of the Order of Australia for service to horse sports, and to the community.
