= Anne McCue =

Australian singer-songwriter

Anne Monica McCue is an Australian singer-songwriter, guitarist, music-recording producer, video director, and radio host, more recently (as of 2007) based in Nashville, Tennessee, United States.

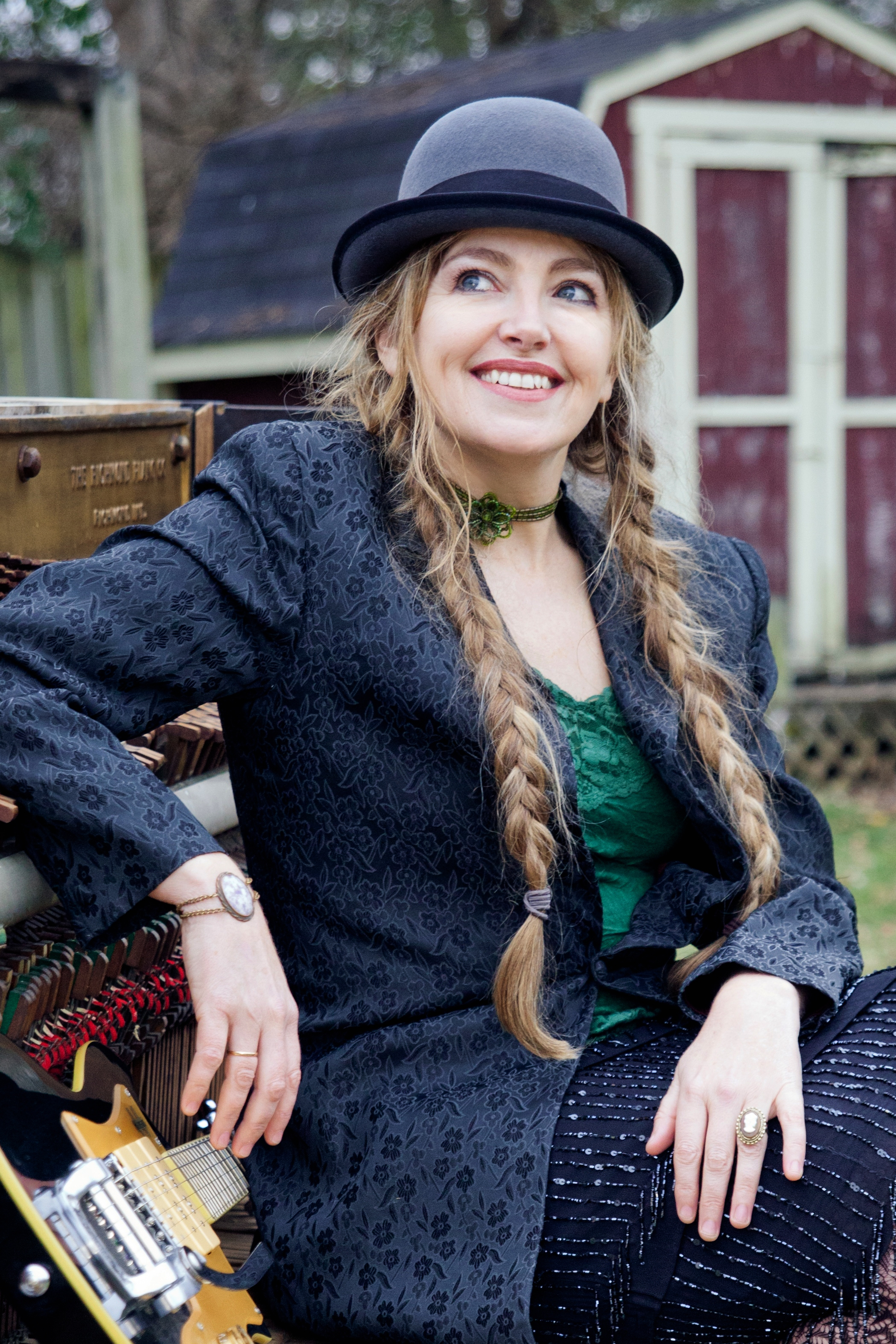
McCue in 2015

== Early life and education ==
McCue grew up in Campbelltown, an area southwest of Sydney and graduated from Saint Patrick's college and the University of Technology, Sydney with a degree in Film Production and Film Studies. In 1988, McCue moved to Melbourne and took guitar lessons from Bruce Clarke.

== Music career ==
McCue is a singer, songwriter, guitarist, multi-instrumentalist, music-recording producer, engineer, and video director.

=== Early bands ===
McCue's first band was based in Sydney and was called Vertigo after the Alfred Hitchcock film.

In 1988 in Melbourne, answering an advertisement in the local press, she joined all-female rock band Girl Monstar as lead guitarist (1988–1993). The band had two Number One hits on the Australian Independent Charts and eventually received an ARIA nomination for best independent act.

Following her stint with Girl Monstar, she played acoustically around Melbourne, later performing in Vietnam for a year before returning to Melbourne to record her Laughing EP (1996). She then joined Australian female trio Eden A.K.A., who signed to Columbia Records in the USA. Eden A.K.A. released the album Eden in 1998, and performed in Canada and the US at the Lilith Fair in 1998 and 1999.

=== Solo and band-leader success ===
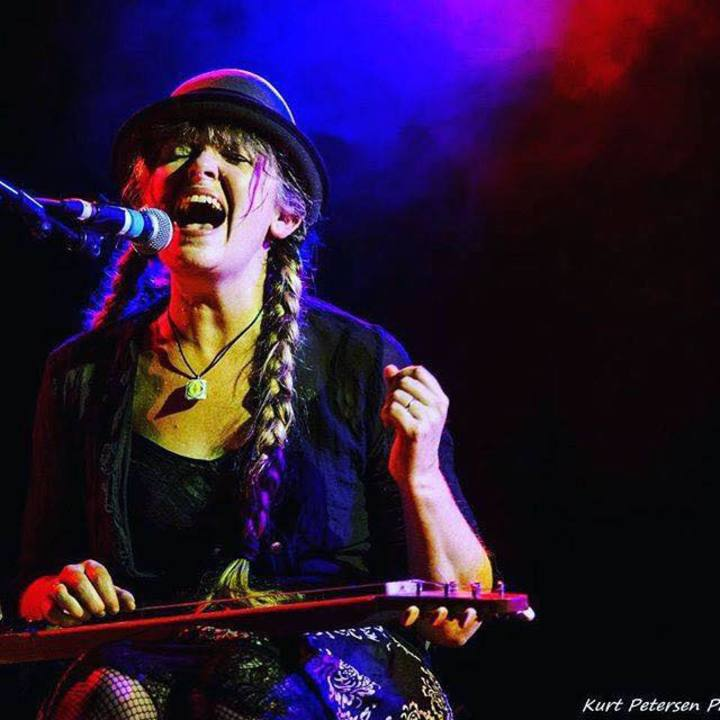
Anne McCue plays lapsteel

After signing with L.A. based manager, Mike Gormley, McCue's first solo album, Amazing Ordinary Things, was released in 1999 in Canada and Japan, and she toured with a number of well-known musicians, including a US tour with Lucinda Williams, who would often introduce McCue as "my new favorite artist... and an amazing guitarist". Williams later included McCue on her Starbucks' 'Artist's Choice' compilation alongside Paul Westerberg, John Coltrane, Ryan Adams, Patti Griffin and Leonard Cohen.

McCue's success on the Lucinda Williams tour prompted the release of a live album, Live: Ballad of an Outlaw Woman, recorded at The Fillmore in San Francisco, California, and her first Messenger Records release, Roll.

Roll also received numerous critical accolades, with Los Angeles Weekly stating that the Australian performer had more "all-American authenticity than a dozen Martina McBrides" and Entertainment Weekly drawing comparisons to Lucinda Williams and Canadian alt-country singer Kathleen Edwards. Bob Harris from the BBC went as far as to call it his album of the year, and she toured internationally to promote the album.

McCue released her album Koala Motel on Messenger Records in 2006. She completed an international tour to promote the album. She relocated from Los Angeles to Nashville. In August 2007, McCue was invited by Deborah Conway to take part in the Broad Festival project, which toured major Australian cities including performing at the Sydney Opera House. With McCue and Conway were Sally Seltmann, Jade Macrae and Abbe May – they performed their own and each other's songs.

Her song "Stupid" (from Roll) is included in the Time Life Collection, "4 Decades of Folk Rock." She was voted Folk Artist of 2008 by the Roots Music Association. McCue recorded and produced her next album herself at her Flying Machine Studio. It was East of Electric, released in August 2008. The first single from her next album, Broken Promise Land, 'Don't Go To Texas' was made available on iTunes and released in November 2009. The new album 'Broken Promise Land' was released on 18 May 2010.

The DVD "Live in Nashville" was released on Flying Machine in 2011. In 2011 McCue released two cover version singles, Leonard Cohen's 'Bird on a Wire' and The Divinyls' 'Pleasure And Pain'. She formed the band 'Yeah No Yeah' with Simon Kerr and they released their first single and video, 'Happy Alone'.

In 2013 McCue released her version of Bruce Springsteen's 'Born to Run' and began recording her new album Blue Sky Thinkin.

In February 2015, McCue released Blue Sky Thinkin' a collection or original songs reminiscent of swing era jazz. The album is a return to her early days in music. In an interview, she noted, "In my earlier existence as a young guitar player in Melbourne, I wanted to be a jazz guitar player. I was studying jazz guitar. I was making my living playing jazz music, more like singing and playing guitar. ... So for me [Blue Sky Thinkin'] was more like going back to that. ... I love the guitar tone of that era. I love the sound of the recordings. To me it’s very warm sounding. I don’t think it’s ever sounded better than that. So I was trying to get those sounds. I’ve listened to Charlie Christian a lot. And also to Django [Reinhardt ]. It was just natural. I didn’t force it. I didn’t tell myself I’m going to make a Charlie Christian type song or do a Django song. I just wanted to do it. I’ve played that stuff a lot and I wanted to write songs in that style."

Anne McCue's 8th studio album 'Wholly Roller Coaster' was released on vinyl and CD in August 2025 with a streaming release in September. Premier Guitar featured the album stating that "... it feels remarkably original and contemporary, thanks to the gentility of McCue’s relaxed, virtuosic playing and singing, and a dappling of pop, rock, and folk flavors from the pre- and post-lysergic days that inform the swirling melodies and strong-boned harmonies, and guitar solos that could as easily be sung as played." The album entered the Americana Top 100 Chart in August 2025.

=== Assisting other musicians ===
McCue produced and recorded two albums for other artists in 2009 – Tracey Bunn's "By The Wayside" and Denise DeSimone's "Pray Peace". She also directed the videos for Amelia White's "Even Angels" and Tracey Bunn's "Shut Up And Let Me Breathe". She produced albums released in 2018, for Ellen Starski (The Days When Peonies Prayed For The Ants) and Scott Miller (Ladies Auxiliary).

McCue played guitar on Robyn Hitchcock's 2017 release Robyn Hitchcock.

== Radio host ==
Since March 2014, McCue has hosted the radio show "Songs on the Wire", which features an eclectic program of music and live interviews, on internet-based "East Nashville Radio". Starting at some time between 2016 and 2018, and as of 2019, her show has been broadcast on low-power FM station WXNA in Nashville. The show is also rebroadcast on two Australian radio stations - Bay and Basin FM in Sanctuary Point, New South Wales, and MainFM 94.9 in Castlemaine, Victoria, as of 2019.

== Solo discography ==
- Laughing EP (EP) – self-released 1996
- Amazing Ordinary Things (CD) – Relentless Records 2000
- Live: Ballad of an Outlaw Woman (CD) – Nightshade Records 2002
- Roll (CD) – Messenger Records 2004
- Koala Motel (CD) – Messenger Records 2006
- East of Electric (CD) – Flying Machine Recordings 2008
- Broken Promise Land (CD) – Flying Machine Recordings 2010
- Pleasure And Pain (Single) – Flying Machine Recordings 2011
- Bird on the Wire (Single) – Flying Machine Recordings 2011
- Born to Run (Single) – Flying Machine Recordings 2013
- Yo-Yos, Marbles and a Piece Of String – Flying Machine Recordings 2014
- Blue Sky Thinkin' - Flying Machines Recordings 2015
- Sister Of The Mainline/Remembory' - Flying Machine Recordings 2020
- The Loneliest Saturday Night' - Flying Machine Recordings 2023
- Wholly Roller Coaster' - Flying Machine Recordings 2025

== Americana Radio Chart ==
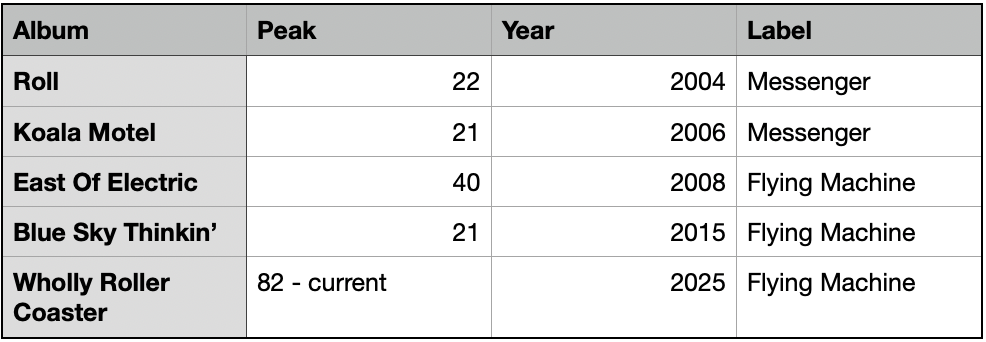
Americana Radio Charts Peak Positions Anne McCue

== Compilations ==
- Artist Choice: Lucinda Williams – (CD) – Starbucks/Hear Music 2002
- This Is Americana (CD) – Narm Recordings 2004
- East Nashville Vol. 3 – (CD) – Red Beet Records 2009
- 4 Decades of Folk Rock (CD Box Set) – Time Life 2007

== As Guitarist and/or Singer ==
- Meryl Bainbridge – Between Days 2001
- Gina Villalobos – Rock'n'Roll Pony 2004
- Michelle Shocked – Mexican Standoff 2005
- Gina Villalobos – Miles Away 2006
- Tracey Bunn – By The Wayside 2011
- Yeah No Yeah – Happy Alone 2011
- Emma Swift – Emma Swift 2015
- Robyn Hitchcock – Robyn Hitchcock 2017 (Yep Roc)
- Ellen Starski – The Days Peonies Prayed For The Ants 2018
- Scott Miller – Ladies' Auxiliary 2018
- Jesse Correll – Inner Shibori 2021

== As Producer and/or Engineer ==
- Denise DeSimone – Pray Peace 2009
- Tracey Bunn – By The Wayside 2010
- Anne McCue – East of Electric 2008
- Anne McCue – Broken Promise Land 2010
- Anne McCue – Pleasure And Pain 2011
- Audrey Auld – Resurrection Moon 2012
- Anne McCue – Born to Run 2013
- Emma Swift – Emma Swift 2015
- Anne McCue – Blue Sky Thinkin' 2015
- Ellen Starski – The Days Peonies Prayed For The Ants 2018
- Scott Miller – Ladies' Auxiliary 2018
- Jesse Correll – Inner Shibori 2022

== As Video Director and/or Editor ==
- Anne McCue – Money In The Morning 2008
- Anne McCue – My New Piano 2009 (short film)
- Anne McCue – All I Need 2008
- Amelia White – Even Angels 2013
- Yeah No Yeah – Happy Alone 2011
- Anne McCue – Things You Left Out In The Rain 2014
- Anne McCue – Cowgirl Blues 2015
- Tracey Bunn - Shutup and Let Me Breathe 2010
