= Timberyard Records =

- Founded: 1985
- Founder: Michael Danias
- Country of origin: Australia
- Location: Marrickville, New South Wales

Timberyard Records is a pioneering record label in the Australian independent music movement of the 1980s.

Timberyard Records was established in 1985 in Newtown, New South Wales by Michael Danias. Initially releasing prominent underground Sydney acts such as Box the Jesuit, Candy Harlots, The Dubrovniks, Girl Monstar, Johnny Teen and the Broken Hearts and the Zen Genies.

In 1989 the label released a Christmas compilation, Rockin' Bethlehem, which featured a number of bands from the label, including The Dubrovniks, Ratcat, Girl Monstar, Steve Kilbey (The Church), Damien Lovelock (The Celibate Rifles), The Jackson Code and Lime Spiders. Proceeds from the sales of the album went to the Camperdown Children's Hospital. In 1990 the label released a second Christmas compilation album, Rockin' Bethlehem - The Second Coming, which featured The Falling Joys, Painters and Dockers, Ed Kuepper, The Screaming Tribesmen, Archie Roach and Paul Kelly. Also that year You Am I signed with Timberyard, with the label subsequently releasing the band's first two EPs, Snake Tide in May 1991 and Goddamn in May 1992. The band then signed to Ra Records, a sub-branch of rooArt Records.

Timberyard took an extended break for many years before becoming active in the mid-2000s, with releases from Melbourne bands, Ripe, Cosmic Psychos and Damn Arms as well as Sydney artists Warhorse, Circle Pit and Atrocities.

In 2004 the label started working with Teenager, a band composed of Nick Littlemore from Pnau and Empire of the Sun and Pip Brown known as Ladyhawke, on an art rock album titled Thirteen. It was recorded in many countries in collaboration with many artists. The album was released in 2006. The first single from the album was titled "Pony".

== See also ==
- List of record labels
