= Boccia at the 2024 Summer Paralympics – Men's individual BC2 =

Boccia – Men's individual BC2 at the XVII Paralympic Games
- Venue: South Paris Arena
- Date: 28 August - 1 September 2024
- Competitors: 24

Medalists
1st place, gold medalist(s)		Worawut Saengampa	Thailand
2nd place, silver medalist(s)		Muhammad Herlangga	Indonesia
3rd place, bronze medalist(s)		Watcharaphon Vongsa	Thailand

The men's individual BC2 boccia event at the 2024 Summer Paralympics will be contested between 28 August and 2 September 2024 at the South Paris Arena.

The event structure begins with pool stages. The top two players from each of six pools then entered into the single-elimination stage, with the losing semifinalists playing off for bronze.

== Classification ==
The BC2 classification is described as follows:

BC2M/F – Players in this class throw the ball with the hand. They are not eligible for assistance.

== Results ==
=== Pool stages ===
The pool stage will be played between 29 and 31 August 2024. The top two players in each pool will qualify to the elimination rounds. The best four group winners will bye pass the first elimination round.

==== Pool A ====
Pos	Player	Pld	W	D	L	PF	PA	PD	Pts	Qualification	(Slovakia)	(Thailand)	(El Salvador)	(France)
1	Robert Mezik (SVK) Q	3	3	0	0	19	2	+17	6	Qualification for quarterfinal or playoff round	—	5–1	6–1	8–0
2	Watcharaphon Vongsa (THA) Q	3	2	0	1	17	10	+7	4	Qualification for playoff round	1–5	—	11–0	5*-5
3	Mario Sayes (ESA)	3	1	0	2	6	19	−13	2	Eliminated	1–6	0–11	—	5–2
4	Fayçal Meguenni (FRA)	3	0	0	3	7	18	−11	0	Eliminated	0–8	5–5*	2–5	—

Updated to match(es) played on 30 August 2024. Source: Paris 2024

Match 1:
Player/End	1	2	3	4	Result	Report
Watcharaphon Vongsa (THA)	0	1	0	0	1	Report
Robert Mezik (SVK)	2	0	2	0	5	Report
Match 2:
Player/End	1	2	3	4	Result	Report
Mario Sayes (ESA)	2	0	2	1	5	Report
Fayçal Meguenni (FRA)	0	2	0	0	2	Report
Match 3:
Player/End	1	2	3	4	Result	Report
Fayçal Meguenni (FRA)	0	0	2	3	5	Report
Watcharaphon Vongsa (THA)	4	1	0	0	5^{tb}	Report
Match 4:
Player/End	1	2	3	4	Result	Report
Mario Sayes (ESA)	0	1	0	0	1	Report
Robert Mezik (SVK)	2	0	1	3	6	Report
Match 5:
Player/End	1	2	3	4	Result	Report
Watcharaphon Vongsa (THA)	3	3	2	3	11	Report
Mario Sayes (ESA)	0	0	0	0	0	Report
Match 6:
Player/End	1	2	3	4	Result	Report
Robert Mezik (SVK)	1	2	4	1	8	Report
Fayçal Meguenni (FRA)	0	0	0	0	0	Report

==== Pool B ====
Pos	Player	Pld	W	D	L	PF	PA	PD	Pts	Qualification	(Thailand)	(South Korea)	(Belgium)	(Tunisia)
1	Worawut Saengampa (THA) Q	3	3	0	0	29	4	+25	6	Qualification for quarterfinal or playoff round	—	5–3	11–0	13–1
2	Seo Minkyu (boccia) (KOR) Q	3	1	0	2	12	13	−1	2	Qualification for playoff round	3–5	—	5–2	4–6
3	Francis Rombouts (BEL)	3	1	0	2	9	16	−7	2	Eliminated	0–11	2–5	—	7–0
4	Ayed ben Youb (TUN)	3	1	0	2	7	24	−17	2	Eliminated	1–13	6–4	0–7	—

Updated to match(es) played on 30 August 2024. Source: Paris 2024

Match 1:
Player/End	1	2	3	4	Result	Report
Worawut Saengampa (THA)	1	6	1	5	13	Report
Ayed ben Youb (TUN)	1	0	0	0	1	Report
Match 2:
Player/End	1	2	3	4	Result	Report
Francis Rombouts (BEL)	0	0	0	2	2	Report
Seo Minkyu (boccia) (KOR)	2	1	2	0	5	Report
Match 3:
Player/End	1	2	3	4	Result	Report
Worawut Saengampa (THA)	3	1	0	1	5	Report
Seo Minkyu (boccia) (KOR)	0	0	3	0	3	Report
Match 4:
Player/End	1	2	3	4	Result	Report
Francis Rombouts (BEL)	1	2	3	1	7	Report
Ayed ben Youb (TUN)	0	0	0	0	0	Report
Match 5:
Player/End	1	2	3	4	Result	Report
Worawut Saengampa (THA)	3	4	2	2	11	Report
Francis Rombouts (BEL)	0	0	0	0	0	Report
Match 6:
Player/End	1	2	3	4	Result	Report
Ayed ben Youb (TUN)	1	5	0	0	6	Report
Seo Minkyu (boccia) (KOR)	1	0	1	2	4	Report

==== Pool C ====
Pos	Player	Pld	W	D	L	PF	PA	PD	Pts	Qualification	(Brazil)	(Israel)	(Netherlands)	(Tunisia)
1	Maciel Santos (BRA) Q	3	3	0	0	23	2	+21	6	Qualification for quarterfinal or playoff round	—	8–0	7–2	8–0(w/o)
2	Nadav Levi (ISR) Q	3	2	0	1	15	10	+5	4	Qualification for playoff round	0–8	—	7–2	8–0(w/o)
3	Marco Dekker (NED)	3	1	0	2	12	14	−2	2	Eliminated	2–7	2–7	—	8–0(w/o)
4	Achraf Tayahi (TUN)	3	0	0	3	0	24	−24	0	Eliminated	0–8(dns)	0–8(dns)	0–8(dns)	—

Updated to match(es) played on 30 August 2024. Source: Paris 2024

Match 1:
Player/End	1	2	3	4	Result	Report
Maciel Santos (BRA)					8	Report
Achraf Tayahi (TUN)					0 DNS	Report
Match 2:
Player/End	1	2	3	4	Result	Report
Marco Dekker (NED)	1	0	0	1	2	Report
Nadav Levi (ISR)	1	2	4	0	7	Report
Match 3:
Player/End	1	2	3	4	Result	Report
Marco Dekker (NED)	0	0	2	0	2	Report
Maciel Santos (BRA)	1	3	0	3	7	Report
Match 4:
Player/End	1	2	3	4	Result	Report
Nadav Levi (ISR)					8	Report
Achraf Tayahi (TUN)					0 DNS	Report
Match 5:
Player/End	1	2	3	4	Result	Report
Maciel Santos (BRA)	1	1	4	2	8	Report
Nadav Levi (ISR)	0	0	0	0	0	Report
Match 6:
Player/End	1	2	3	4	Result	Report
Marco Dekker (NED)					8	Report
Achraf Tayahi (TUN)					0 DNS	Report

==== Pool D ====
Pos	Player	Pld	W	D	L	PF	PA	PD	Pts	Qualification	(Indonesia)	(China)	(Japan)	(Canada)
1	Felix Ardi Yudha (INA) Q	3	3	0	0	21	5	+16	6	Qualification for quarterfinal or playoff round	—	5–2	5–2	11–1
2	Yan Zhiqiang (CHN) Q	3	2	0	1	28	5	+23	4	Qualification for playoff round	2–5	—	17–0	9–0
3	Takayuki Hirose (JPN)	3	1	0	2	8	24	−16	2	Eliminated	2–5	0–17	—	6–2
4	Danik Allard (CAN)	3	0	0	3	3	26	−23	0	Eliminated	1–11	0–9	2–6	—

Updated to match(es) played on 30 August 2024. Source: Paris 2024

Match 1:
Player/End	1	2	3	4	Result	Report
Felix Ardi Yudha (INA)	1	0	4	0	5	Report
Yan Zhiqiang (CHN)	0	1	0	1	2	Report
Match 2:
Player/End	1	2	3	4	Result	Report
Takayuki Hirose (JPN)	0	3	1	2	6	Report
Danik Allard (CAN)	2	0	0	0	2	Report
Match 3:
Player/End	1	2	3	4	Result	Report
Felix Ardi Yudha (INA)	0	4	4	3	11	Report
Danik Allard (CAN)	1	0	0	0	1	Report
Match 4:
Player/End	1	2	3	4	Result	Report
Takayuki Hirose (JPN)	0	0	0	0	0	Report
Yan Zhiqiang (CHN)	2	6	4	5	17	Report
Match 5:
Player/End	1	2	3	4	Result	Report
Felix Ardi Yudha (INA)	0	2	0	3	5	Report
Takayuki Hirose (JPN)	1	0	1	0	2	Report
Match 6:
Player/End	1	2	3	4	Result	Report
Yan Zhiqiang (CHN)	1	3	2	3	9	Report
Danik Allard (CAN)	0	0	0	0	0	Report

==== Pool E ====
Pos	Player	Pld	W	D	L	PF	PA	PD	Pts	Qualification	(Indonesia)	(Japan)	(Malaysia)	(China)
1	Muhammad Herlangga (INA) Q	3	3	0	0	23	5	+18	6	Qualification for quarterfinal or playoff round	—	3–2	11–2	9–1
2	Hidetaka Sugimura (JPN) Q	3	2	0	1	13	8	+5	4	Qualification for playoff round	2–3	—	6–5	5–0
3	Lee Chee Hoong (MAS)	3	1	0	2	10	18	−8	2	Eliminated	2–11	5–6	—	3–1
4	Lan Zhijian (CHN)	3	0	0	3	2	175	−173	0	Eliminated	1–9	0–5	1–3	—

Updated to match(es) played on 30 August 2024. Source: Paris 2024

Match 1:
Player/End	1	2	3	4	Result	Report
Lan Zhijian (CHN)	0	0	0	0	0	Report
Hidetaka Sugimura (JPN)	1	1	2	1	5	Report
Match 2:
Player/End	1	2	3	4	Result	Report
Lee Chee Hoong (MAS)	0	0	2	0	2	Report
Muhammad Herlangga (INA)	2	5	0	4	11	Report
Match 3:
Player/End	1	2	3	4	Result	Report
Lee Chee Hoong (MAS)	3	2	0	0	5	Report
Hidetaka Sugimura (JPN)	0	0	4	2	6	Report
Match 4:
Player/End	1	2	3	4	Result	Report
Muhammad Herlangga (INA)	2	1	6	0	9	Report
Lan Zhijian (CHN)	1	0	0	0	1	Report
Match 5:
Player/End	1	2	3	4	Result	Report
Muhammad Herlangga (INA)	0	0	1	2	3	Report
Hidetaka Sugimura (JPN)	1	1	0	0	2	Report
Match 6:
Player/End	1	2	3	4	Result	Report
Lan Zhijian (CHN)	0	1	0	0	1	Report
Lee Chee Hoong (MAS)	1	0	1	1	3	Report

==== Pool F ====
Pos	Player	Pld	W	D	L	PF	PA	PD	Pts	Qualification	(Portugal)	(Argentina)	(France)	(Brazil)
1	David Araujo (POR) Q	3	2	0	1	16	6	+10	4	Qualification for quarterfinal or playoff round	—	6–2	2–4	8–0
2	Luis Cristaldo (ARG) Q	3	2	0	1	13	11	+2	4	Qualification for playoff round	2–8	—	6–1	5–2
3	Aurélien Fabre (FRA)	3	1	0	2	7	14	−7	2	Eliminated	4–2	1–6	—	2–6
4	Iuri Tauan Silva (BRA)	3	1	0	2	8	15	−7	2	Eliminated	0–8	2–5	6–2	—

Updated to match(es) played on 30 August 2024. Source: Paris 2024

Match 1:
Player/End	1	2	3	4	Result	Report
Aurélien Fabre (FRA)	0	1	0	0	1	Report
Luis Cristaldo (ARG)	2	0	2	2	6	Report
Match 2:
Player/End	1	2	3	4	Result	Report
Iuri Tauan Silva (BRA)	0	0	0	0	0	Report
David Araujo (POR)	1	3	3	1	8	Report
Match 3:
Player/End	1	2	3	4	Result	Report
Iuri Tauan Silva (BRA)	0	0	1		2	Report
Luis Cristaldo (ARG)	2	3	0	0	5	Report
Match 4:
Player/End	1	2	3	4	Result	Report
Aurélien Fabre (FRA)	0	1	2	1	4	Report
David Araujo (POR)	2	0	0	0	2	Report
Match 5:
Player/End	1	2	3	4	Result	Report
Luis Cristaldo (ARG)	0	0	0	2	2	Report
David Araujo (POR)	2	1	3	0	6	Report
Match 6:
Player/End	1	2	3	4	Result	Report
Aurélien Fabre (FRA)	0	1	1	0	2	Report
Iuri Tauan Silva (BRA)	4	0	0	2	6	Report

=== Elimination stage ===
The final stage (or knockout stage) will be played between 31 August and 1 September. The Men's individual BC2 is the only event in the 2024 programme which will include a play-off, or play-in, round before the quarterfinals.

Elimination bracket

Play-off rounds
31 August, South Paris Arena
L Cristaldo (ARG)	4*
N Levi (ISR)	4
31 August, South Paris Arena
M Herlangga (INA)	7
F Rombouts (BEL)	1
31 August, South Paris Arena
H Sugimura (JPN)	5
Yan Zhiqiang (CHN)	2
31 August, South Paris Arena
D Araujo (POR)	1
W Vongsa (THA)	6

Quarter-finals
31 August, South Paris Arena
R Mezik (SVK)	5
L Cristaldo (ARG)	4
31 August, South Paris Arena
F A Yudha (INA)	2
M Herlangga (INA)	3
31 August, South Paris Arena
H Sugimura (JPN)	3
W Saengampa (THA)	5
31 August, South Paris Arena
M Santos (BRA)	3
W Vongsa (THA)	3*

Semi-finals
1 September, South Paris Arena
R Mezik (SVK)	1
M Herlangga (INA)	6
1 September, South Paris Arena
W Saengampa (THA)	9
W Vongsa (THA)	1

Final
1 September, South Paris Arena
W Saengampa (THA)	6
M Herlangga (INA)	1
Bronze medal
1 September, South Paris Arena
W Vongsa (THA)	3
R Mezik (SVK)	2

Round of 16

Match 16R1:
Player/End	1	2	3	4	Result	Report
M Herlangga (INA)	0	5	1	1	7	Report
F Rombouts (BEL)	1	0	0	0	1	Report
Match 16R2:
Player/End	1	2	3	4	Result	Report
D Araujo (POR)	0	1	0	0	1	Report
W Vongsa (THA)	1	0	4	1	6	Report
Match 16R3:
Player/End	1	2	3	4	Result	Report
H Sugimura (JPN)	1	3	0	1	5	Report
Yan Zhiqiang (CHN)	0	0	2	0	2	Report
Match 16R4:
Player/End	1	2	3	4	Result	Report
L Cristaldo (ARG)	0	2	0	2	4*	Report
N Levi (ISR)	3	0	1	0	4	Report

Quarterfinals

Match QF1:
Player/End	1	2	3	4	Result	Report
R Mezik (SVK)	0	2	1	2	5	Report
L Cristaldo (ARG)	3	0	1	0	4	Report
Match QF2:
Player/End	1	2	3	4	Result	Report
W Saengampa (THA)	0	0	1	4	5	Report
H Sugimura (JPN)	2	1	0	0	3	Report
Match QF3:
Player/End	1	2	3	4	Result	Report
M Santos (BRA)	3	0	0	0	3	Report
W Vongsa (THA)	0	1	1	1	3*	Report
Match QF4:
Player/End	1	2	3	4	Result	Report
F A Yudha (INA)	0	1	0	1	2	Report
M Herlangga (INA)	1	1	1	0	3	Report

Semifinals

Match SF1:
Player/End	1	2	3	4	Result	Report
R Mezik (SVK)	0	1	0	0	1	Report
M Herlangga (INA)	4	0	1	1	6	Report
Match SF2:
Player/End	1	2	3	4	Result	Report
W Vongsa (THA)	0	0	0	0	1	Report
W Saengampa (THA)	4	4	1	0	9	Report

Finals

Bronze medal match:
Player/End	1	2	3	4	Result	Report
W Vongsa (THA)	0	0	1	2	3	Report
R Mezik (SVK)	1	1	0	0	2	Report
Gold medal match:
Player/End	1	2	3	4	Result	Report
W Saengampa (THA)	2	2	0	2	6	Report
M Herlangga (INA)	0	0	1	0	1	Report
