= Boccia at the 2024 Summer Paralympics – Mixed team BC1–2 =

Boccia – Team BC1/BC2 at the XVII Paralympic Games
- Venue: South Paris Arena
- Date: 2–4 September 2024
- Competitors: 36 from 12 nations

Medalists
1st place, gold medalist(s)		Lan Zhijian; Yan Zhiqiang; Zhang Qi	China
2nd place, silver medalist(s)		Muhamad Afrizal Syafa; Felix Ardi Yudha; Gischa Zayana	Indonesia
3rd place, bronze medalist(s)		Hiromi Endo; Takayuki Hirose; Hidetaka Sugimura	Japan

The mixed team BC1–2 boccia event in the 2024 Summer Paralympics was played between 2 and 4 September 2024 at the South Paris Arena. 36 athletes from 12 nations, each team containing 3 athletes, participated in the competition.

The BC1 and BC2 classifications are described as follows:

- BC1M/F – Players in this class throw the ball with the hand or foot. They may compete with an assistant who stays outside the competitor's playing box, to stabilize or adjust their playing chair and give the ball to the player when requested.
- BC2M/F – Players in this class throw the ball with the hand. They are not eligible for assistance.

== Team rosters ==
The following are the 12 rosters for the teams in Mixed Team BC1-2 event.

Team	Athletes	Team	Athletes
Brazil	Andreza de Oliveira; Maciel Santos; Iuri Tauan Silva	France	Aurelie Aubert; Aurelien Fabre; Faycal Meguenni
Great Britain	Kayleigh Haggo; David Smith; Claire Taggart	Indonesia	Muhamad Afrizal Syafa; Felix Ardi Yudha; Gischa Zayana
Japan	Hiromi Endo; Takayuki Hirose; Hidetaka Sugimura	Netherlands	Marco Dekker; Daniel Perez; Chantal van Engelen
China	Zhijian Lan; Zhiqiang Yan; Qi Zhang	Portugal	David Araujo; Cristina Goncalves; Andre Ramos
South Korea	Soyeong Jeong; Sungjoon Jung; Minkyu Seo	Slovakia	Eliska Jankechova; Tomas Kral; Robert Mezik
Thailand	Witsanu Huadpradit; Satanan Phromsiri; Watcharaphon Vongsa	Tunisia	Maha Aounallah; Ayed Ben Youb; Achraf Tayahi

== Results ==
=== Pools ===
The pool stage will be played between 3 and 4 September where the top 2 teams in each pool will qualify for the quarterfinals.

Pool A

Pos	Player	Pld	W	D	L	PF	PA	PD	Pts	Qualification	(Japan)	(South Korea)	(Tunisia)
1	Japan	2	2	0	0	16	4	+12	4	Qualification for quarterfinal	—	5–3	11–1
2	South Korea	2	1	0	1	22	6	+16	2	Qualification for quarterfinal	3–5	—	19–1
3	Tunisia	2	0	0	2	2	30	−28	0	Eliminated	1–11	1–19	—

Updated to match(es) played on 31 August 2024. Source: Paris 2024

Pool B

Pos	Player	Pld	W	D	L	PF	PA	PD	Pts	Qualification	(Slovakia)	(Brazil)	(Thailand)
1	Slovakia	2	2	0	0	15	7	+8	4	Qualification for quarterfinal	—	6–5	9–2
2	Brazil	2	1	0	1	12	9	+3	2	Qualification for quarterfinal	5–6	—	7–3
3	Thailand	2	0	0	2	5	16	−11	0	Eliminated	2–9	3–7	—

Updated to match(es) played on 31 August 2024. Source: Paris 2024

Pool C

Pos	Player	Pld	W	D	L	PF	PA	PD	Pts	Qualification	(China)	(United Kingdom)	(Portugal)
1	China	2	2	0	0	21	4	+17	4	Qualification for quarterfinal	—	13–1	8–3
2	Great Britain	2	1	0	1	6	17	−11	2	Qualification for quarterfinal	1–13	—	5–4
3	Portugal	2	0	0	2	8	13	−5	0	Eliminated	3–8	4–5	—

Updated to match(es) played on 31 August 2024. Source: Paris 2024

Pool D

Pos	Player	Pld	W	D	L	PF	PA	PD	Pts	Qualification	(Indonesia)	(France)	(Netherlands)
1	Indonesia	2	2	0	0	17	6	+11	4	Qualification for quarterfinal	—	8–3	9–3
2	France	2	1	0	1	11	10	+1	2	Qualification for quarterfinal	3–8	—	8–2
3	Netherlands	2	0	0	2	7	17	−10	0	Eliminated	3–9	2–8	—

Updated to match(es) played on 31 August 2024. Source: Paris 2024

=== Elimination stage ===
The final stage (or knockout stage) will be played between 4 and 5 September

Quarter-finals
4 September, South Paris Arena
Japan	4*
Brazil	4
4 September, South Paris Arena
Indonesia	7*
Great Britain	7
4 September, South Paris Arena
Slovakia	4
South Korea	8
4 September, South Paris Arena
China	7
France	4

Semi-finals
4 September, South Paris Arena
Japan	0
Indonesia	9
4 September, South Paris Arena
South Korea	3
China	7

Final
5 September, South Paris Arena
Indonesia	6
China	7
Bronze medal
5 September, South Paris Arena
Japan	8
South Korea	3

Elimination Matches

Quarterfinals

Match QF1:
Player/End	1	2	3	4	5	6	Result	Report
Japan	1	0	0	0	0	3	4*	Report
Brazil	0	1	1	1	1	0	4	Report
Match QF2:
Player/End	1	2	3	4	5	6	Result	Report
South Korea	3	2	2	0	0	1	8	Report
Slovakia	0	0	0	3	1	0	4	Report
Match QF3:
Player/End	1	2	3	4	5	6	Result	Report
France	1	0	2	0	0	1	4	Report
China	0	2	0	2	2	1	7	Report
Match QF4:
Player/End	1	2	3	4	5	6	Result	Report
Indonesia	2	2	0	1	0	2	7*	Report
Great Britain	0	0	3	0	4	0	7	Report

Semifinals

Match SF1:
Player/End	1	2	3	4	5	6	Result	Report
Indonesia	1	1	2	1	2	2	9	Report
Japan	0	0	0	0	0	0	0	Report
Match SF2:
Player/End	1	2	3	4	5	6	Result	Report
China	3	1	3	0	0	0	7	Report
South Korea	0	0	0	1	1	1	3	Report

Finals

Bronze medal match:
Player/End	1	2	3	4	5	6	Result	Report
South Korea	0	0	3	0	0	0	3	Report
Japan	1	3	0	1	2	1	8	Report
Gold medal match:
Player/End	1	2	3	4	5	6	Result	Report
China	1	3	2	1	0	0	7	Report
Indonesia	0	0	0	0	3	3	6	Report
