= Felix Ardi Yudha =

Indonesian Paralympic boccia player

Personal information
- Born: 7 July 1993 (age 33) Grobogan, Indonesia

Sport
- Sport: Boccia
- Disability class: BC2
Medal record
Men's boccia
Representing Indonesia
Paralympic Games
| Silver medal – second place | 2024 Paris | Team BC1–2 |
World Championships
| Gold medal – first place | 2026 Seoul | Team BC1–2 |
| Silver medal – second place | 2026 Seoul | Individual BC2 |
Asian Para Games
| Gold medal – first place | 2022 Hangzhou | Individual BC2 |
| Gold medal – first place | 2026 Aichi–Nagoya | Individual BC2 |
| Gold medal – first place | 2026 Aichi–Nagoya | Team BC1–2 |
| Silver medal – second place | 2022 Hangzhou | Team BC1–2 |
ASEAN Para Games
| Gold medal – first place | 2025 Nakhon Ratchasima | Team BC1–2 |
| Silver medal – second place | 2022 Surakarta | Team BC1–2 |
| Bronze medal – third place | 2022 Surakarta | Individual BC2 |

Felix Ardi Yudha (born 7 July 1993) is an Indonesian boccia player. He represented Indonesia at the 2024 Summer Paralympics.

== Early life ==
Yudha's impairment is classified as mild to moderate locomotor dysfunction affecting the trunk and limbs, qualifying him for the BC2 category in para-sports, where athletes exhibit greater functional ability in the upper body compared to more severe classes but still face limitations in overall movement. Growing up in the rural area of Grobogan, he encountered significant hurdles in daily life, such as navigating uneven terrain and limited access to specialized medical or rehabilitation services typical of rural Indonesian settings. Initial interventions focused on coping strategies reflecting limited resources in his hometown, until his classification for para-sports in 2017 provided structured evaluation and support.

== Career ==
Yudha career breakthrough came at the 2022 Asian Para Games in Hangzhou, China, where he secured Indonesia's first-ever gold medal in boccia by excelling in individual and team competitions, contributing to the nation's strong sixth-place overall finish with 29 gold, 30 silver, and 36 bronze medals. Building on this success, Yudha made his Paralympic debut at the 2024 Summer Paralympics in Paris, France, as part of Indonesia's inaugural boccia team. Teaming up with teammates Muhammad Afrizal Syafa and Gischa Zayana, he won a silver medal in the mixed BC1/BC2 event after defeating Great Britain 7–7 (tiebreak) in the quarterfinals and Japan 9–0 in the semifinals, before narrowly losing 7–6 to China in the final; this marked Indonesia's first boccia medal at the Paralympics and highlighted the rapid rise of the sport in the country.

== Achievements ==
=== Paralympic Games ===
Team BC1–2

| Year | Venue | Partner | Opponent | Score | Result | Ref |
|---|---|---|---|---|---|---|
| 2024 | South Paris Arena, Paris, France | (Indonesia) Muhamad Syafa (Indonesia) Gischa Zayana | (China) Lan Zhijian (China) Yan Zhiqiang (China) Zhang Qi | 6–7 | (silver) Silver | |

=== World Championships ===
Team BC1–2

| Year | Venue | Partner | Opponent | Score | Result | Ref |
|---|---|---|---|---|---|---|
| 2026 | Seoul Olympic Park, Seoul, South Korea | (Indonesia) Muhamad Syafa (Indonesia) Gischa Zayana | (Portugal) André Ramos (Portugal) Cristina Gonçalves (Portugal) David Araújo | 9–4 | (gold) Gold | |

=== Asian Para Games ===
Individual BC2

| Year | Venue | Opponent | Score | Result | Ref |
|---|---|---|---|---|---|
| 2022 | Hangzhou Gymnasium, Hangzhou, China | (Malaysia) Lee Chee Hong | 5–3 | (gold) Gold | |

=== World Boccia Cup ===
Individual BC2

| Year | Venue | Opponent | Score | Result | Ref |
|---|---|---|---|---|---|
| 2024 | Montreal, Canada | (Japan) Hidetaka Sugimura | 1–5 | (silver) Silver | |
| 2026 | Astana, Kazakhstan | (South Korea) Seo Min-kyu | 5–3 | (gold) Gold | |
| 2026 | Póvoa de Varzim, Portugal | (Indonesia) Muhammad Herlangga | 3–2 | (gold) Gold | |

Team BC1–2

| Year | Venue | Partner | Opponent | Score | Result | Ref |
|---|---|---|---|---|---|---|
| 2024 | Montreal, Canada | (Indonesia) Muhamad Syafa (Indonesia) Gischa Zayana | (South Korea) Jeong So-yeong (South Korea) Seo Min-kyu (South Korea) Jung Sung-joon | 10–3 | (gold) Gold | |
| 2026 | Astana, Kazakhstan | (Indonesia) Muhamad Syafa (Indonesia) Gischa Zayana | (Portugal) André Ramos (Portugal) Cristina Gonçalves (Portugal) David Araújo | 7–3 | (gold) Gold | |
