= Boccia at the 2024 Summer Paralympics =

Boccia at the XVII Paralympic Games
- Boccia pictogram for the 2024 Summer Paralympics
- Venue: South Paris Arena
- Dates: 29 August – 5 September
- Competitors: 124 from 36 nations

Boccia at the 2024 Summer Paralympics in Paris, France took place at the Paris Expo Porte de Versailles. There were 124 qualification slots (48 female, 48 male, 28 gender free) across eleven events. It was the first time that individual events were held in two separate categories for men and women; in previous Paralympics, men and women took part together in mixed individual events. Team and pairs events were mixed, where one man and one woman took part.

== Qualification ==
A total of 48 male, 48 female and 28 gender-free quotas are allocated via championships and World rankings.

Means of qualification	Date	Venue	Qualified											Total
Means of qualification	Date	Venue	Men's BC1	Men's BC2	Men's BC3	Men's BC4	Women's BC1	Women's BC2	Women's BC3	Women's BC4	Team BC1-2	Pairs BC3	Pairs BC4	Total
2023 African Championships	2–10 July 2023	(Egypt) Cairo	—N/a								Tunisia	South Africa	Egypt	7
2023 European Championships	6–14 August 2023	(Netherlands) Rotterdam	—N/a								Netherlands	Czech Republic	Ukraine	7
2023 Parapan American Games	17–25 November 2023	(Chile) Santiago	—N/a								Brazil	Argentina	Canada	7
2023 Asia/Oceania Championships	1–9 December 2023	Hong Kong	—N/a								Thailand	South Korea	China	7
2024 Paralympic Tournament	22–28 March 2024	(Portugal) Coimbra	—N/a								China; Indonesia; Slovakia	Great Britain; Greece; Japan	Brazil; Malaysia; Spain	21
World Boccia rankings	1 January – 31 December 2023	—	John Loung (HKG); Eduardo Sanchez Reyes (MEX)	Luis Claudio Cristaldo Diaz (ARG); Nadav Levi (ISR)	José Gonçalves (POR); Damian Iskrzycki (POL)	Boris Nicolai (GER); Shunsuke Uchida (JPN)	Jeralyn Tan (SGP); Yushae Desilva-Andrade (BER)	Hiu Lam Yeung (HKG); Rebeca Duarte (ESA)	Ana Costa (POR); Edyta Owczarz (POL)	Carla Oliveira (POR); Alexandra Szabo (HUN)	South Korea; Great Britain; Portugal; Japan	Australia; Hong Kong; Thailand; Brazil	Colombia; Hong Kong; Thailand; Slovakia; Croatia	46
Host country allocation	13 September 2017	(Peru) Lima	—N/a								France	France		5
Bipartite invitation allocation	17 June 2024	—	José Carlos Chagas (BRA); Lance Cryderman (CAN); Dohyun Kim (KOR); Witsanu Huadpradit (THA)	Francis Rombouts (BEL); Danik Allard (CAN); Mario Sayes (ESA); Muhammad Herlangga (INA); Chee Hoong Lee (MAS)	Jesús Romero (COL); Patrick Wilson (GBR)	Euclides Grisales (COL); Stephen McGuire (GBR)	Ailén Flores (ARG); Dora Basic (CRO); Amagoia Arrieta (ESP); Kinga Koza (POL)	Joselyn Leon (ECU); Viven Nagy (HUN); Ana Catarina Correia (POR)	Evani Calado (BRA); Niurka Callupe (PER)	Anita Raguwaran (GER); Chrysi Morfi Metzou (GRE)	—N/a			24
Total														124

== Medal table ==
This is the final medal table at the conclusion of the Boccia competition at the 2024 Summer Paralympics. Hong Kong led the table with three gold medals. The eleven competitions led to eight different gold medalist winning countries. * Host nation (France)

Rank	NPC	Gold	Silver	Bronze	Total
1	Hong Kong	3	2	0	5
2	China	2	0	0	2
3	South Korea	1	3	1	5
4	Colombia	1	1	1	3
5	Thailand	1	0	2	3
6	France*	1	0	0	1
6	Great Britain	1	0	0	1
6	Portugal	1	0	0	1
9	Indonesia	0	2	2	4
10	Australia	0	2	0	2
11	Singapore	0	1	0	1
12	Japan	0	0	2	2
13	Argentina	0	0	1	1
13	Greece	0	0	1	1
13	Ukraine	0	0	1	1
Totals (15 entries)		11	11	11	33

== Medalists ==
=== Men ===
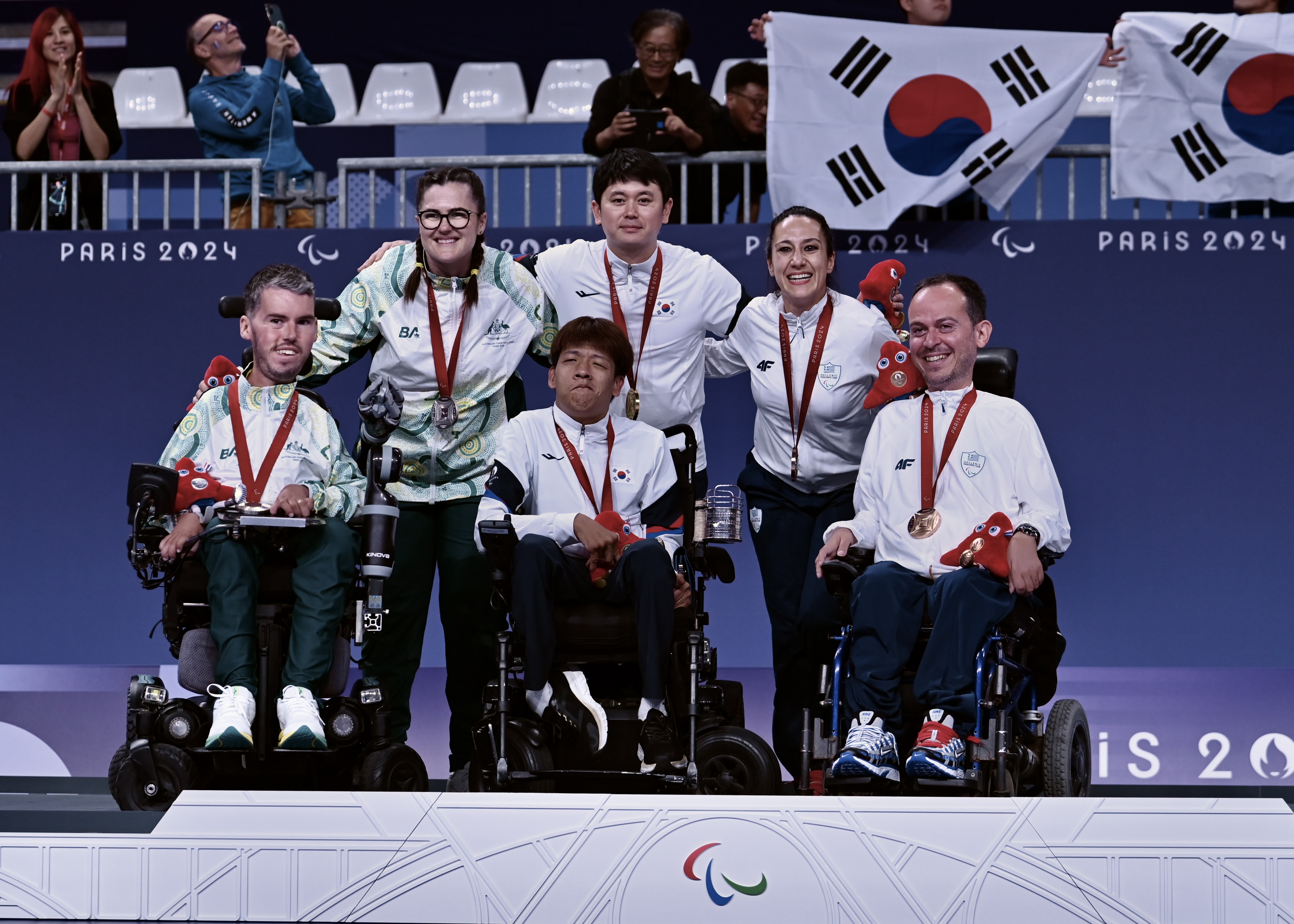
BC3 winners (left to right): Daniel Michel (Australia), Jeong Ho-won (Korea) and Grigorios Polychronidis (Greece)

Event	Class	Gold	Silver	Bronze
Individual	BC1	John Loung; Hong Kong	Jung Sung-joon; South Korea	Muhamad Afrizal Syafa; Indonesia
Individual	BC2	Worawut Saengampa; Thailand	M. Bintang Satria Herlangga; Indonesia	Watcharaphon Vongsa; Thailand
Individual	BC3	Jeong Ho-won; South Korea	Daniel Michel; Australia	Grigorios Polychronidis; Greece
Individual	BC4	Stephen McGuire; Great Britain	Edilson Chica; Colombia	Artem Kolinko; Ukraine

=== Women ===
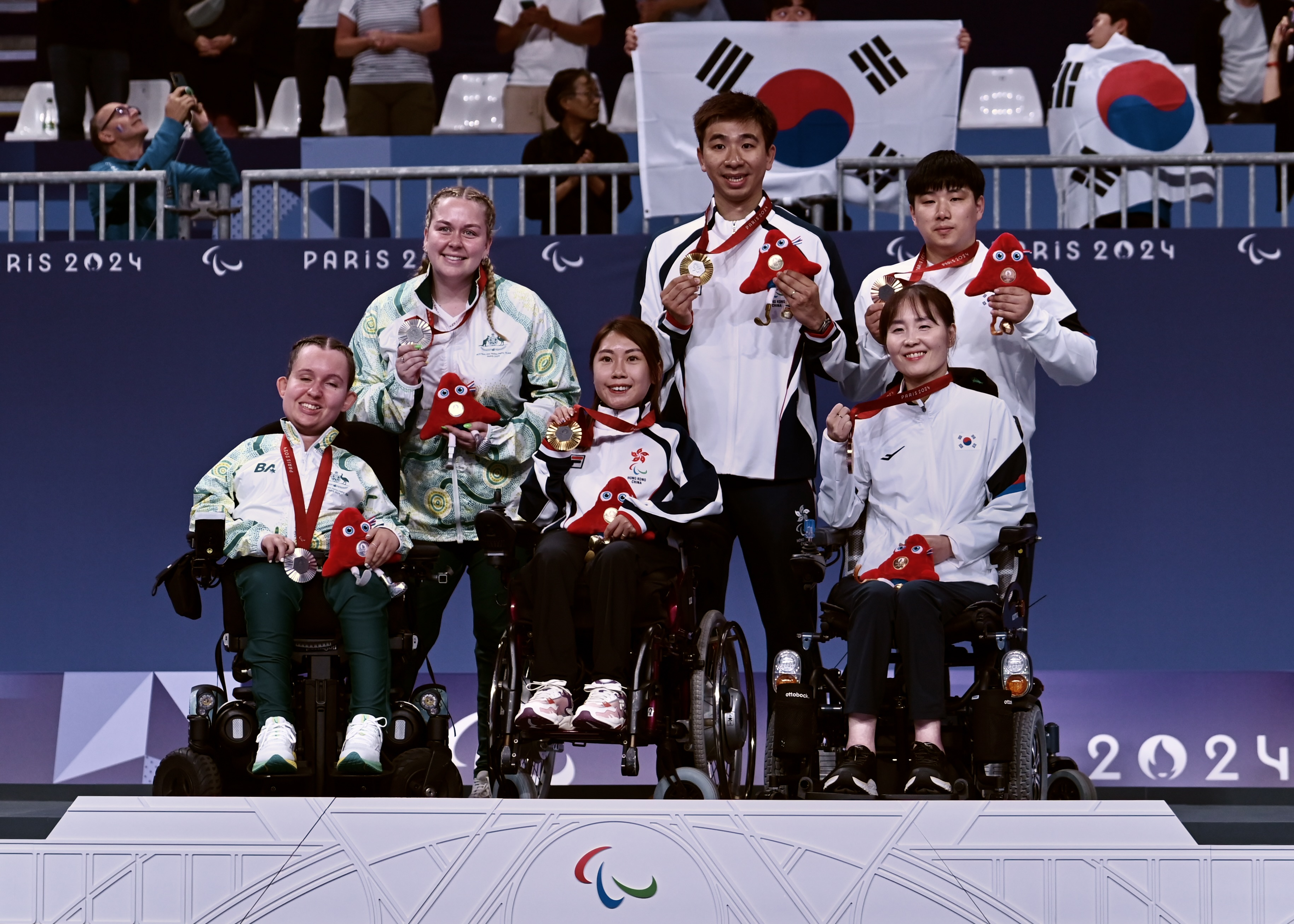
BC3 winners (left to right): Jamieson Leeson (Australia), Ho Yuen Kei (Hong Kong) and Kang Sun-hee (Korea)

Event	Class	Gold	Silver	Bronze
Individual	BC1	Aurélie Aubert; France	Jeralyn Tan; Singapore	Hiromi Endo; Japan
Individual	BC2	Cristina Gonçalves; Portugal	Jeong So-yeong; South Korea	Gischa Zayana; Indonesia
Individual	BC3	Ho Yuen Kei; Hong Kong	Jamieson Leeson; Australia	Kang Sun-hee; South Korea
Individual	BC4	Lin Ximei; China	Cheung Yuen; Hong Kong	Leidy Chica; Colombia

=== Mixed ===
Event	Class	Gold	Silver	Bronze
Pair	BC3	Hong Kong; Ho Yuen Kei; Tse Tak Wah	South Korea; Jeong Ho-won; Kang Sun-hee	Argentina; Stefanía Ferrando; Rodrigo Romero
Pair	BC4	Colombia; Edilson Chica; Leidy Chica	Hong Kong; Leung Yuk Wing; Cheung Yuen	Thailand; Pornchok Larpyen; Nuanchan Phonsila
Team	BC1/BC2	China; Zhang Qi; Yan Zhiqiang; Lan Zhijian	Indonesia; Gischa Zayana; Felix Ardi Yudha; Muhamad Afrizal Syafa	Japan; Hiromi Endo; Takayuki Hirose; Hidetaka Sugimura
