= Boccia at the 2016 Summer Paralympics – Individual BC2 =

Boccia – Individual BC2 at the XV Paralympic Games
- Venue: Sambodromo
- Dates: 13 September 2016 – 6 September 2016
- Competitors: 24

Medalists
1st place, gold medalist(s)		Watcharaphon Vongsa	Thailand
2nd place, silver medalist(s)		Worawut Saengampa	Thailand
3rd place, bronze medalist(s)		Yan Zinqiang	China

The mixed individual BC2 boccia event at the 2016 Summer Paralympics was contested from 13 September to 16 September at Sambodromo in Rio de Janeiro. 24 competitors took part.

The event structure was amended from the 2012 event, with the final eight drawn from group stages. The top players from each of eight pools of three entered into a quarter final single elimination stage, with the losing semifinalists playing off for bronze.

Watcharaphon Vongsa of Thailand defeat compatriot Worawut Saengampa 5-4 in the final match to win the gold medal, the sixth for Thailand at the 2016 Games. In doing so, it ensured the 2016 Paralympic Games were the most successful enjoyed by Thailand since it first entered in 1984

== Elimination rounds ==
Quarter finals
Yan Zinqiang (CHN)	4
Sohn Jeong Min (KOR)	2
Watcharaphon Vongsa (THA)	6
Takayuki Hirose (JPN)	1
Worawut Saengampa (THA)	12
Abilio Valente (POR)	1
Jeong So Yeong (KOR)	5*
Hidetaka Sugimura (JPN)	5

Semi finals
Yan Zinqiang (CHN)	0
Watcharaphon Vongsa (THA)	11
Worawut Saengampa (THA)	10
Jeong So Yeong (KOR)	1

Gold medal match
Watcharaphon Vongsa (THA)	5 (gold)
Worawut Saengampa (THA)	4 (silver)
Bronze medal match
Yan Zinqiang (CHN)	5 (bronze)
Jeong So Yeong (KOR)	4

== Pool stages ==
=== Pool A ===
Boccia at the 2016 Summer Paralympics – Individual BC2 pool A
Pos	Player	Pld	W	D	L	PF	PA	PD	Pts	H2H	Player	(China)	(Portugal)	(Hong Kong)
1 Q	Yan Zhiqiang (CHN)	2	2	0	0	16	1	+15	6	H2H	(China)		8-1	8-0
2	Fernando Ferreira (POR)	2	1	0	1	6	10	-4	4	H2H	(Portugal)	1-8		5-2
3	Yeung Hiu Lam (HKG)	2	0	0	2	2	13	−11	2	H2H	(Hong Kong)	0-8	2-5	

=== Pool B ===
Boccia at the 2016 Summer Paralympics – Individual BC2 pool B
Pos	Player	Pld	W	D	L	PF	PA	PD	Pts	H2H	Player	(South Korea)	(Brazil)	(Argentina)
1 Q	Jeong So Yeong (KOR)	2	2	0	0	8	5	+3	6	H2H	(South Korea)		4-3	4-2
2	Maciel Santos (BRA)	2	1	0	1	10	6	+4	4	H2H	(Brazil)	3-4		7-2
3	Sebastian Gonzalez (ARG)	2	0	0	2	4	11	−7	2	H2H	(Argentina)	2-4	2-7	

=== Pool C ===
Boccia at the 2016 Summer Paralympics – Individual BC2 pool C
Pos	Player	Pld	W	D	L	PF	PA	PD	Pts	H2H	Player	(Thailand)	(Portugal)	(United Kingdom)
1 Q	Worawut Saengampa (THA)	2	2	0	0	17	4	+13	6	H2H	(Thailand)		7-4	10-0
2	Cristina Goncalves (POR)	2	1	0	1	11	9	+2	4	H2H	(Portugal)	4-7		7-2
3	Joshua Rowe (GBR)	2	0	0	2	2	17	−15	2	H2H	(United Kingdom)	0-10	2-7	

=== Pool D ===
Boccia at the 2016 Summer Paralympics – Individual BC2 pool D
Pos	Player	Pld	W	D	L	PF	PA	PD	Pts	H2H	Player	(Thailand)	(Spain)	(United Kingdom)
1 Q	Watcharaphon Vongsa (THA)	2	2	0	0	20	3	+17	6	H2H	(Thailand)		12-2	8-1
2	Manuel Martin Perez (ESP)	2	1	0	1	10	14	-4	4	H2H	(Spain)	2-12		8-2
3	Nigel Murray (GBR)	2	0	0	2	3	16	−13	2	H2H	(United Kingdom)	1-8	2-8	

=== Pool E ===
Boccia at the 2016 Summer Paralympics – Individual BC2 pool E
Pos	Player	Pld	W	D	L	PF	PA	PD	Pts	H2H	Player	(Japan)	(Slovakia)	(Hong Kong)
1 Q	Takayuki Hirose (JPN)	2	2	0	0	13	2	+11	6	H2H	(Japan)		4-2	9-0
2	Robert Mezic (SVK)	2	1	0	1	12	4	+8	4	H2H	(Slovakia)	2-4		10-0
3	Kwok Hoi Ying (HKG)	2	0	0	2	0	19	−19	2	H2H	(Hong Kong)	0-9	0-10	

=== Pool F ===
Boccia at the 2016 Summer Paralympics – Individual BC2 pool F
Pos	Player	Pld	W	D	L	PF	PA	PD	Pts	H2H	Player	(Portugal)	(Brazil)	(China)
1 Q	Abilio Valente (POR)	2	1	1	0	6	3	+3	5	H2H	(Portugal)		4-1	2-2
2	Lucas de Araújo (BRA)	2	1	0	1	10	4	+6	4	H2H	(Brazil)	1-4		9-0
3	Zhong Kai (CHN)	2	0	1	1	2	11	−9	3	H2H	(China)	2-2	0-9	

=== Pool G ===
Boccia at the 2016 Summer Paralympics – Individual BC2 pool G
Pos	Player	Pld	W	D	L	PF	PA	PD	Pts	H2H	Player	(Japan)	(Netherlands)	(Mexico)
1 Q	Hidetaka Sugimura (JPN)	2	2	0	0	13	2	+11	6	H2H	(Japan)		7-1	6-1
2	Bernd Meints (NED)	2	1	0	1	4	9	-5	4	H2H	(Netherlands)	1-7		3-2
3	Damian Oseguara (MEX)	2	0	0	2	3	9	−6	2	H2H	(Mexico)	1-6	2-3	

=== Pool H ===
Boccia at the 2016 Summer Paralympics – Individual BC2 pool H
Pos	Player	Pld	W	D	L	PF	PA	PD	Pts	H2H	Player	(South Korea)	(Israel)	(Bermuda)
1 Q	Sohn Jeong Min (KOR)	2	2	0	0	12	2	+10	6	H2H	(South Korea)		5-2	7-0
2	Schlomo Nadav Levi (ISR)	2	0	1	1	4	7	-3	3	H2H	(Israel)	2-5		2-2
3	Yushae Desilva-Andrade (BER)	2	0	1	1	2	9	−7	3	H2H	(Bermuda)	0-7	2-2	
