= Boccia at the 2012 Summer Paralympics – Individual BC2 =

Boccia – Individual BC2 at the XIV Paralympic Games
- Venue: ExCeL London
- Dates: 5 September 2012 – 8 September 2012
- Competitors: 29 from 15 nations

Medalists
1st place, gold medalist(s)		Maciel Sousa Santos	Brazil
2nd place, silver medalist(s)		Yan Zhiqiang	China
3rd place, bronze medalist(s)		So-Yeong Jeong	South Korea

The individual BC2 boccia event at the 2012 Summer Paralympics was contested from 5 to 8 September at ExCeL London.

== Seeding matches ==
Two preliminary matches were held to determine the participants' seed for the tournament bracket.

Match 59
1	Tomas Kral (SVK)	5*
2	Alexandros Papadakis (GRE)	5

Match 60
1	Robert Mezik (SVK)	7
2	Frantisek Serbus (CZE)	2

== Draw ==
=== Finals ===
Semifinals
Kai Zhong (CHN)	1
Maciel Sousa Santos (BRA)	7
So-Yeong Jeong (KOR)	2
Zhiqiang Yan (CHN)	5

Gold medal match
Maciel Sousa Santos (BRA)	8
Zhiqiang Yan (CHN)	0
Bronze medal match
Kai Zhong (CHN)	1
So-Yeong Jeong (KOR)	5

=== 5th–8th place matches ===
Semifinals
Nigel Murray (GBR)	0
Hiu Lam Yeung (HKG)	11
Jeong-Min Sohn (KOR)	2
Abilio Valente (POR)	3

5th–6th place match
Hiu Lam Yeung (HKG)	1
Abilio Valente (POR)	4
7th–8th place match
Nigel Murray (GBR)	7
Jeong-Min Sohn (KOR)	2

=== Top half ===
First round
Natali Mello de Faria (BRA)	0
Takayuki Hirose (JPN)	12
Dan Bentley (GBR)	1
Cristina Gonçalves (POR)	4
Kai Zhong (CHN)	3
Karen (hoi Ying) Kwok (HKG)	2
Adam Dukovich (CAN)	5*
Zoe Robinson (GBR)	5
Pedro Cordero Martin (ESP)	1
Maciel Sousa Santos (BRA)	9
Jeong-Min Sohn (KOR)	5
Mongkol Jitsa-Ngiem (THA)	4
Hidetaka Sugimura (JPN)	5
Watcharaphon Vongsa (THA)	5*

Second round
Nigel Murray (GBR)	8
Takayuki Hirose (JPN)	0
Cristina Gonçalves (POR)	3
Kai Zhong (CHN)	4
Adam Dukovich (CAN)	3
Maciel Sousa Santos (BRA)	9
Jeong-Min Sohn (KOR)	7
Watcharaphon Vongsa (THA)	2

Quarterfinals
Nigel Murray (GBR)	1
Kai Zhong (CHN)	3
Maciel Sousa Santos (BRA)	5*
Jeong-Min Sohn (KOR)	5

Semifinals
Kai Zhong (CHN)	1
Maciel Sousa Santos (BRA)	7

=== Bottom half ===
First round
Fernando Ferreira (POR)	5
Pablo Cortez (ARG)	4
Hiu Lam Yeung (HKG)	3
Dave Richer (CAN)	2
Frantisek Serbus (CZE)	5
Tomas Kral (SVK)	1
Abilio Valente (POR)	6
Tom Leahy (IRL)	1
Alexandros Papadakis (GRE)	3
Manuel Martin Perez (ESP)	4
Roberta Connolly (IRL)	2
Robert Mezik (SVK)	5

Second round
So-Yeong Jeong (KOR)	5
Fernando Ferreira (POR)	4
Hiu Lam Yeung (HKG)	12
Frantisek Serbus (CZE)	0
Abilio Valente (POR)	3*
Manuel Martin Perez (ESP)	3
Robert Mezik (SVK)	5
Zhiqiang Yan (CHN)	6

Quarterfinals
So-Yeong Jeong (KOR)	5
Hiu Lam Yeung (HKG)	4
Abilio Valente (POR)	5
Zhiqiang Yan (CHN)	7

Semifinals
So-Yeong Jeong (KOR)	2
Zhiqiang Yan (CHN)	5

== Final ranking ==
1st place, gold medalist(s)	Maciel Sousa Santos (BRA)
2nd place, silver medalist(s)	Yan Zhiqiang (CHN)
3rd place, bronze medalist(s)	So-Yeong Jeong (KOR)
4	Kai Zhong (CHN)
5	Abilio Valente (POR)
6	Hiu Lam Yeung (HKG)
7	Nigel Murray (GBR)
8	Jeong-Min Sohn (KOR)
