= Boccia at the 2020 Summer Paralympics – Mixed team BC1–2 =

Boccia – Team BC1/BC2 at the XVI Paralympic Games
- Venue: Ariake Gymnastics Centre
- Date: 2–4 September 2021
- Competitors: 40 from 10 nations

Medalists
1st place, gold medalist(s)		Witsanu Huadpradit; Subin Tipmanee; Worawut Saengampa; Watcharaphon Vongsa	Thailand
2nd place, silver medalist(s)		Zhang Qi; Yan Zhiqiang; Lan Zhijian	China
3rd place, bronze medalist(s)		Takumi Nakamura; Yuriko Fujii; Hidetaka Sugimura; Takayuki Hirose	Japan

The mixed team BC1/BC2 boccia event in the 2020 Summer Paralympics was played between 2 and 4 September 2021. 40 athletes from 10 nations, each team containing 4 athletes, participated in the competition.

== Team rosters ==
Each roster/team has 3 or 4 athletes. All team having both genders, male (M) and female (F).

- Argentina:
  - Mauricio Ibarbure (M)
  - Ailen Flores (F)
  - Luis Cristaldo (M)
  - Jonathan Aquino (M)
- Brazil:
  - José Carlos Chagas de Oliveira (M)
  - Andreza Vitoria de Oliveira (F)
  - Maciel Santos (M)
  - Natali de Faria (F)
- China:
  - Zhang Qi (F)
  - Yan Zhiqiang (M)
  - Lan Zhijian (M)
- Great Britain:
  - David Smith (M)
  - Claire Taggart (F)
  - Will Hipwell (M)
- Japan:
  - Takumi Nakamura (M)
  - Yuriko Fujii (F)
  - Hidetaka Sugimura (M)
  - Takayuki Hirose (M)

- South Korea:
  - Jung Sung-joon (M)
  - Lee Yong-jin (M)
  - Jeong So-yeong (F)
- Portugal:
  - André Ramos (M)
  - Abílio Valente (M)
  - Cristina Gonçalves (F)
  - Nelson Fernandes (M)
- RPC:
  - Mikhail Gutnik (M)
  - Olga Dolgova (F)
  - Dmitry Kozmin (M)
  - Diana Tsyplina (F)
- Slovakia:
  - Tomas Kral (M)
  - Robert Mezik (M)
  - Rastislav Kurilak (M)
  - Kristina Kudlacova (F)
- Thailand:
  - Witsanu Huadpradit (M)
  - Subin Tipmanee (F)
  - Worawut Saengampa (M)
  - Watcharaphon Vongsa (M)

== Results ==
=== Pools ===
The pool stage will be played between 2 and 3 September where the top 2 teams in each pool will qualify for the quarterfinals.

==== Pool A ====
Athlete	Pld	W	L	PW	PA	Diff	Qualification
China	4	4	0	31	17	+14	Advance to semi-finals
Thailand	4	3	1	36	10	+26	Advance to semi-finals
RPC	4	2	2	23	29	-6	
Great Britain	4	1	3	18	34	-16	
Argentina	4	0	4	14	32	-18	

Date	Time	Team 1	Score	Team 2
2 September	9:30	Thailand	11–2	Argentina
2 September	9:30	China	11–7	(United Kingdom) Great Britain
2 September	14:25	Thailand	9–2	(United Kingdom) Great Britain
2 September	14:25	RPC (Russia)	7 (2)–7 (0)	Argentina
2 September	18:05	Thailand	13–0	(Russia) RPC
2 September	18:05	China	8–1	Argentina
3 September	11:15	China	6 (1)–6 (0)	(Russia) RPC
3 September	11:15	Great Britain (United Kingdom)	6–4	Argentina
3 September	16:10	Thailand	3–6	China
3 September	16:10	RPC (Russia)	10–3	(United Kingdom) Great Britain

==== Pool B ====
Athlete	Pld	W	L	PW	PA	Diff	Qualification
Japan	4	3	1	24	16	+8	Advance to semi-finals
Portugal	4	2	2	22	17	+5	Advance to semi-finals
Brazil	4	2	2	17	22	-5	
South Korea	4	2	2	16	20	-4	
Slovakia	4	1	3	15	19	-4	

Date	Time	Team 1	Score	Team 2
2 September	9:30	Brazil	2–9	Portugal
2 September	9:30	Japan	8–2	Slovakia
2 September	14:25	Japan	5–4	Portugal
2 September	14:25	South Korea	3 (1)–3 (0)	Slovakia
2 September	18:05	Japan	5–6	South Korea
2 September	18:05	Brazil	5–4	Slovakia
3 September	11:15	Brazil	6–3	South Korea
3 September	11:15	Portugal	3–6	Slovakia
3 September	16:10	Japan	6–4	Brazil
3 September	16:10	South Korea	4–6	Portugal

== Knockout stage ==
The knockout stage will be played on 4 September.

Semi-finals
China	6
Portugal	2
Japan	3
Thailand	8

Finals
China	2
Thailand	8
Third place match
Portugal	3
Japan	4
