= Boccia at the 2024 Summer Paralympics – Women's individual BC2 =

Boccia – Women's individual BC2 at the XVII Paralympic Games
- Venue: South Paris Arena
- Date: 29 August - 2 September 2024
- Competitors: 12 from 10 nations
- Winning time: Final score : 4-1

Medalists
1st place, gold medalist(s)		Cristina Gonçalves	Portugal
2nd place, silver medalist(s)		Jeong So-yeong	South Korea
3rd place, bronze medalist(s)		Gischa Zayana	Indonesia

The women's individual BC2 boccia event at the 2024 Summer Paralympics will be contested between 28 August and 2 September 2024 at the South Paris Arena.

The event structure begins with pool stages. The top two players from each of four pools then entered into a quarter-final single-elimination stage, with the losing semifinalists playing off for bronze.

== Classification ==
The BC2 classification is described as follows:

BC2M/F – Players in this class throw the ball with the hand. They are not eligible for assistance.

== Results ==
=== Pool stages ===
The pool stage will be played between 29 and 31 August 2024. The top two players in each pool will qualify to the quarterfinals.

Pool A

Pos	Player	Pld	W	D	L	PF	PA	PD	Pts	Qualification	(Portugal)	(United Kingdom)	(Ecuador)
1	Cristina Gonçalves (POR) Q	2	2	0	0	7	4	+3	4	Qualification for quarterfinal	—	4–3	3–1
2	Claire Taggart (GBR) Q	2	1	0	1	13	5	+8	2	Qualification for quarterfinal	3–4	—	10–1
3	Joselyn León (ECU)	2	0	0	2	2	13	−11	0	Eliminated	1–3	1–10	—

Updated to match(es) played on 29 August 2024. Source: Paris 2024

Pool B

Pos	Player	Pld	W	D	L	PF	PA	PD	Pts	Qualification	(Hong Kong)	(El Salvador)	(Slovakia)
1	Yeung Hiu Lam (HKG) Q	2	2	0	0	11	3	+8	4	Qualification for quarterfinal	—	3^-3	8–0
2	Rebeca Duarte (ESA) Q	2	1	0	1	15	3	+12	2	Qualification for quarterfinal	3–3*	—	12–0
3	Eliska Jankechova (SVK)	2	0	0	2	0	20	−20	0	Eliminated	0–8	0–12	—

Updated to match(es) played on 29 August 2024. Source: Paris 2024

Pool C

Pos	Player	Pld	W	D	L	PF	PA	PD	Pts	Qualification	(South Korea)	(United Kingdom)	(Portugal)
1	Jeong So-yeong (KOR)	2	2	0	0	7	4	+3	4	Qualification for quarterfinal	—	3–1	4–3
2	Kayleigh Haggo (GBR)	2	1	0	1	7	5	+2	2	Qualification for quarterfinal	1–3	—	6–2
3	Ana Correia (POR)	2	0	0	2	5	10	−5	0	Eliminated	3–4	2–6	—

Updated to match(es) played on 29 August 2024. Source: Paris 2024

Pool D

Pos	Player	Pld	W	D	L	PF	PA	PD	Pts	Qualification	(Indonesia)	(Netherlands)	(Hungary)
1	Gischa Zayana (INA)	2	2	0	0	15	2	+13	4	Qualification for quarterfinal	—	9–1	6–1
2	Chantal van Engelen (NED)	2	1	0	1	5	12	−7	2	Qualification for quarterfinal	1–9	—	4–3
3	Vivien Nagy (HUN)	2	0	0	2	4	10	−6	0	Eliminated	1–6	3–4	—

Updated to match(es) played on 29 August 2024. Source: Paris 2024

=== Elimination stage ===
The final stage (or knockout stage) will be played between 1 August and 2 September.

Quarter-finals
1 September, South Paris Arena
Cristina Gonçalves (POR)	5
Rebeca Duarte (ESA)	4
1 September, South Paris Arena
Gischa Zayana (INA)	8
Kayleigh Haggo (GBR)	2
1 September, South Paris Arena
Yeung HL (HKG)	2
Claire Taggart (GBR)	3
1 September, South Paris Arena
Jeong So-yeong (KOR)	4
C v. Engelen (NED)	1

Semi-finals
1 September, South Paris Arena
C Goncalves (POR)	7
Gischa Zayana (INA)	3
1 September, South Paris Arena
Claire Taggart (GBR)	2
Jeong S (KOR)	3

Final
2 September, South Paris Arena
C Goncalves (POR)	4
Jeong S (KOR)	1
Bronze medal
2 September, South Paris Arena
Gischa Zayana (INA)	5
Claire Taggart (GBR)	2

Elimination Matches

Quarterfinals

Match QF1:
Player/End	1	2	3	4	Result	Report
Rebeca Duarte (ESA)	0	2	0	2	4	Report
Cristina Gonçalves (POR)	2	0	3	0	5	Report
Match QF2:
Player/End	1	2	3	4	Result	Report
Yeung HL (HKG)	2	0	0	0	2	Report
Claire Taggart (GBR)	0	1	1	1	3	Report
Match QF3:
Player/End	1	2	3	4	Result	Report
C v. Engelen (NED)	0	1	0	2	3	Report
Jeong So-yeong (KOR)	1	0	3	0	4	Report
Match QF4:
Player/End	1	2	3	4	Result	Report
Kayleigh Haggo (GBR)	0	0	0	2	2	Report
Gischa Zayana (INA)	4	3	1	0	8	Report

Semifinals

Match SF1:
Player/End	1	2	3	4	Result	Report
Gischa Zayana (INA)	1	1	0	1	3	Report
Cristina Gonçalves (POR)	3	1	3	0	7	Report
Match SF2:
Player/End	1	2	3	4	Result	Report
Jeong So-yeong (KOR)	1	0	1	1	3	Report
Claire Taggart (GBR)	0	2	0	0	2	Report

Finals

Bronze medal match:
Player/End	1	2	3	4	Result	Report
Claire Taggart (GBR)	0	0	1	1	2	Report
Gischa Zayana (INA)	2	2	0	1	5	Report
Gold medal match:
Player/End	1	2	3	4	Result	Report
Jeong So-yeong (KOR)	0	0	0	1	1	Report
Cristina Gonçalves (POR)	1	2	1	0	4	Report
