= Boccia at the 2016 Summer Paralympics – Team BC1–2 =

Boccia – Team BC1–2 at the XV Paralympic Games
- Paralympic Boccia
- Venue: Riocentro, Barra Cluster
- Dates: 10 September 2016 – 12 September 2016
- Competitors: 48
- Teams: 12

Medalists
1st place, gold medalist(s)		Pattaya Tadtong; Watcharaphon Vongsa; Worawut Saengampa; Subin Tipmanee	Thailand
2nd place, silver medalist(s)		Takayuki Kitani; Takayuki Hirose; Yuriko Fujii; Hidetaka Sugimura	Japan
3rd place, bronze medalist(s)		Abilio Valente; Antonio Marques; Cristina Goncalves; Fernando Ferreira	Portugal

The mixed team BC1–2 boccia event at the 2016 Summer Paralympics was held from 10 to 12 September at Riocentro, an exhibition and convention center located in Rio de Janeiro, part of the Games' Barra Cluster of venues.

== Final rounds ==
Quarter-finals
Thailand	11
Great Britain	0
Argentina	6
Hong Kong	4
Japan	5*
China	5
Brazil	5
Portugal	6

Semi-finals
Thailand	14
Argentina	1
Japan	8
Portugal	5

Gold medal match
Thailand	9
Japan	4
Bronze medal match
Argentina	2
Portugal	6

== Pool stages ==
=== Pool A ===
Pool A : Pool Matches
Thailand	16
South Korea	1
China	5
South Korea	5
Thailand	11
China	4

Pool A Table
Q	Thailand	6
Q *	China	3
South Korea	3

- China progressed on points difference.

=== Pool B ===
Pool B : Pool Matches
Japan	10
Great Britain	4
Japan	6
Netherlands	3
Great Britain	11
Netherlands	2

Pool B Table
Q	Japan	6
Q	Great Britain	4
Netherlands	2

=== Pool C ===
Pool C : Pool Matches
Brazil	8
Spain	1
Hong Kong	6
Spain	3
Brazil	5
Hong Kong	4

Pool C Table
Q	Brazil	6
Q	Hong Kong	4
Spain	2

=== Pool D ===
Pool D : Pool Matches
Argentina	5
Slovakia	4
Portugal	12
Slovakia	1
Argentina	7
Portugal	1

Pool D Table
Q	Argentina	6
Q	Portugal	4
Slovakia	2

== Rosters ==
The twelve competing nations each entered a team of four athletes with no specifications on the athlete's gender.

Thailand
Pattaya Tadtong
Watcharaphon Vongsa
Worawut Saengampa
Subin Tipmanee

China
Sun Kai
Zhang Qi
Yan Zhiqiang
Zhong Kai

South Korea
Lee Dong Won
Yoo Won Jeong
Sohn Jeong Min
Jeong So Yeong

Japan
Takayuki Kitani
Takayuki Hirose
Yuriko Fujii
Hidetaka Sugimura

Great Britain
David Smith
Nigel Murray
Joshua Rowe
Claire Taggart

Netherlands

Brazil

Hong Kong

Spain

Argentina
Mauricio Barbure
Sebastian Gonzalez
Maria Sahonero
Luis Cristaldo

Portugal
Abilio Valente
Antonio Marques
Cristina Goncalves
Fernando Ferreira

Slovakia
