= Bermuda at the 2024 Summer Paralympics =

2024 sporting event delegation in Paris

- Flag of Bermuda
- IPC code: BER
- NPC: Bermuda Paralympic Association

in Paris, France August 28, 2024 – September 8, 2024
- Competitors: 2 (2 women) in 2 sports
- Flag bearer: Jessica Cooper Lewis
- Medals: Gold 0 Silver 0 Bronze 0 Total 0

Summer Paralympics appearances (overview)
- 1996; 2000; 2004; 2008; 2012; 2016; 2020; 2024

Bermuda competed at the 2024 Summer Paralympics in Paris, France, from 28 August to 8 September 2024.

== Competitors ==
The following is the list of number of competitors in the Games, including game-eligible alternates in team sports.

Sport	Men	Women	Total
Athletics	0	1	1
Boccia	0	1	1
Total	0	2	2

== Athletics ==
Key

- Note–Ranks given for track events are within the athlete's heat only
- Q = Qualified for the next round
- q = Qualified for the next round as a fastest loser or, in field events, by position without achieving the qualifying target
- DQ = Disqualified
- PR = Paralympic Record
- AR = Area (or continental) Record
- NR = National Record
- SB = Season's Best
- N/A = Round not applicable for the event
- Bye = Athlete not required to compete in round

Track & road events
Women

Athlete	Event	Heat		Final	
Athlete	Event	Result	Rank	Result	Rank
Jessica Cooper Lewis	Women's 100 m T53	—N/a		16.83	5
Jessica Cooper Lewis	Women's 400 m T53	—N/a		1:00.82	7

== Boccia ==
Athlete	Event	Pool matches			Quarterfinals	Semifinals	Final / BM	
Athlete	Event	Opposition Score	Opposition Score	Rank	Opposition Score	Opposition Score	Opposition Score	Rank
Yushae DeSilva-Andrade	Women's individual BC1	Koza (POL); W 4–1	Endo (JPN); L 1–5	2 Q	Zhang (CHN); W 4–2	Aubert (FRA); L 2–2*	Endo (JPN); L 0–7	4

== See also ==
- Bermuda at the 2024 Summer Olympics
- Bermuda at the Paralympics
