= Boccia at the 2024 Summer Paralympics – Women's individual BC1 =

Boccia – Women's individual BC1 at the XVII Paralympic Games
- Venue: South Paris Arena
- Date: 29 August - 2 September 2024
- Competitors: 12 from 11 nations
- Final score: 5-4

Medalists
1st place, gold medalist(s)		Aurélie Aubert	France
2nd place, silver medalist(s)		Jeralyn Tan	Singapore
3rd place, bronze medalist(s)		Hiromi Endo	Japan

The women's individual BC1 boccia event at the 2024 Summer Paralympics will be contested between 28 August and 2 September 2024 at the South Paris Arena.

The event structure begins with pool stages. The top two players from each of four pools then entered into a quarter-final single-elimination stage, with the losing semifinalists playing off for bronze.

== Classification ==
The BC1 classification is described as follows:

BC1M/F – Players in this class throw the ball with the hand or foot. They may compete with an assistant who stays outside the competitor's playing box, to stabilize or adjust their playing chair and give the ball to the player when requested.

== Results ==
=== Pool stages ===
The pool stage will be played between 29 and 31 August 2024. The top two players in each pool will qualify to the quarterfinals.

==== Pool A ====
Pos	Player	Pld	W	D	L	PF	PA	PD	Pts	Qualification	(Japan)	(Brazil)	(Argentina)
1	Yuriko Fujii (JPN) Q	2	2	0	0	10	3	+7	4	Qualification for quarterfinal	—	6–1	4–2
2	Andreza de Oliveira (BRA) Q	2	1	0	1	6	8	−2	2	Qualification for quarterfinal	1–6	—	5–2
3	Ailén Flores (ARG)	2	0	0	2	3	9	−6	0	Eliminated	1–4	2–5	—

Updated to match(es) played on 31 August 2024. Source: Paris 2024

Pool A boxscores

Match A1:
Player/End	1	2	3	4	Result	Report
(Brazil) de Oliveira	0	0	0	1	1	Report
(Japan) Funii	2	1	3	0	6	Report
Match A2:
Player/End	1	2	3	4	Result	Report
(Argentina) Flores	0	2	0	0	2	Report
(Japan) Funii	1	0	1	2	4	Report
Match A3:
Player/End	1	2	3	4	Result	Report
(Argentina) Flores	1	0	1	0	2	Report
(Brazil) de Oliveira	0	3	0	2	5	Report

==== Pool B ====
Pos	Player	Pld	W	D	L	PF	PA	PD	Pts	Qualification	(Singapore)	(France)	(Spain)
1	Jeralyn Tan (SGP) Q	2	2	0	0	11	2	+9	4	Qualification for quarterfinal	—	6–1	5–1
2	Aurélie Aubert (FRA) Q	2	1	0	1	4	9	−5	2	Qualification for quarterfinal	1–6	—	3^{(TB)}-3
3	Amagoia Arrieta (ESP)	2	0	0	2	4	8	−4	0	Eliminated	1–5	3–3^{(TB)}	—

Updated to match(es) played on 31 August 2024. Source: Paris 2024

Matches
Pool B

Match B1:
Player/End	1	2	3	4	Result	Report
(Singapore) Tan	3	0	1	1	5	Report
(Spain) Arrieta	0	1	0	0	1	Report
Match B2:
Player/End	1	2	3	4	Result	Report
(France) Aubert	1	0	0	0	1	Report
(Singapore) Tan	0	1	3	2	6	Report
Match B3:
Player/End	1	2	3	4	Result	Report
(Spain) Arrieta	0	0	3	0	3	Report
(France) Aubert	1	1	0	1	3^{(TB)}	Report

==== Pool C ====
Pos	Player	Pld	W	D	L	PF	PA	PD	Pts	Qualification	(Japan)	(Bermuda)	(Poland)
1	Hiromi Endo (JPN) Q	2	2	0	0	10	5	+5	4	Qualification for quarterfinal	—	5–1	5–4
2	Yushae DeSilva-Andrade (BER) Q	2	1	0	1	5	6	−1	2	Qualification for quarterfinal	1–5	—	4–1
3	Kinga Koza (POL)	2	0	0	2	5	9	−4	0	Eliminated	4–5	1–4	—

Updated to match(es) played on 31 August 2024. Source: Paris 2024

Matches
Pool C

Match C1:
Player/End	1	2	3	4	Result	Report
(Bermuda) Andrade	1	1	1	1	1	Report
(Japan) Hitomi	3	1	0	1	5	Report
Match C2:
Player/End	1	2	3	4	Result	Report
(Poland) Koza	0	1	0	0	1	Report
(Bermuda) Andrade	1	0	2	1	4	Report
Match C3:
Player/End	1	2	3	4	Result	Report
(Japan) Hitomi	0	1	0	4	5	Report
(Poland) Koza	2	0	2	0	4	Report

==== Pool D ====
Pos	Player	Pld	W	D	L	PF	PA	PD	Pts	Qualification	(China)	(Croatia)	(Tunisia)
1	Zhang Qi (CHN) Q	2	2	0	0	26	1	+25	4	Qualification for quarterfinal	—	7–1	19–0
2	Dora Basic (CRO) Q	2	1	0	1	20	7	+13	2	Qualification for quarterfinal	1–7	—	19–0
3	Maha Aounallah (TUN)	2	0	0	2	0	38	−38	0	Eliminated	0–19	0–19	—

Updated to match(es) played on 31 August 2024. Source: Paris 2024

Matches
Pool D

Match D1:
Player/End	1	2	3	4	Result	Report
(Croatia) Basic	0	0	0	0	0	Report
(China) Zhang	2	2	2	1	7	Report
Match D2:
Player/End	1	2	3	4	Result	Report
(Tunisia) Aounallah	0	0	0	0	0	Report
(Croatia) Basic	6	3	6	4	19	Report
Match D3:
Player/End	1	2	3	4	Result	Report
(China) Zhang	4	5	6	4	19	Report
(Tunisia) Aounallah	0	0	0	0	0	Report

=== Elimination stage ===
The final stage (or knockout stage) will be played between 1 August and 2 September.

Quarter-finals
1 September, South Paris Arena
A Aubert (FRA)	4
Fujii (JPN)	3
1 September, South Paris Arena
Zhang Qi (CHN)	2
Y d S-Andrade (BER)	4
1 September, South Paris Arena
A de Oliveira (BRA)	5
Tan YT (SGP)	7
1 September, South Paris Arena
H Endo (JPN)	7
Dora Basic (CRO)	0

Semi-finals
1 September, South Paris Arena
A Aubert (FRA)	2^{(TB)}
Y d S-Andrade (BER)	2
1 September, South Paris Arena
H Endo (JPN)	1
Tan YT (SGP)	5

Final
2 September, South Paris Arena
A Aubert (FRA)	5
Tan YT (SGP)	4
Bronze medal
2 September, South Paris Arena
Y d S-Andrade (BER)	0
H Endo (JPN)	7

Elimination Matches

Quarterfinals

Match QF1:
Player/End	1	2	3	4	Result	Report
Aurélie Aubert (FRA)	0	2	2	0	4	Report
Yuriko Fujii (JPN)	2	0	0	1	3	Report
Match QF2:
Player/End	1	2	3	4	Result	Report
Andreza de Oliveira (BRA)	0	1	0	4	5	Report
Jeralyn Tan (SGP)	1	0	6	0	7	Report
Match QF3:
Player/End	1	2	3	4	Result	Report
Hiromi Endo (JPN)	1	2	2	1	7	Report
Dora Basic (CRO)	0	0	0	0	0	Report
Match QF4:
Player/End	1	2	3	4	Result	Report
Yushae DeSilva-Andrade (BER)	1	2	1	0	4	Report
Zhang Qi (CHN)	0	0	0	2	2	Report

Semifinals

Match SF1:
Player/End	1	2	3	4	Result	Report
Aurélie Aubert (FRA)	0	1	0	1*	2*	Report
Yushae DeSilva-Andrade (BER)	1	0	1	0	2	Report
Match SF2:
Player/End	1	2	3	4	Result	Report
Hiromi Endo (JPN)	0	0	0	1	1	Report
Jeralyn Tan (SGP)	1	2	2	0	5	Report

Finals

Bronze medal match:
Player/End	1	2	3	4	Result	Report
Yushae DeSilva-Andrade (BER)	0	0	0	0	0	Report
Hiromi Endo (JPN)	1	3	2	1	7	Report
Gold medal match:
Player/End	1	2	3	4	Result	Report
Aurélie Aubert (FRA)	2	3	0	0	5	Report
Jeralyn Tan (SGP)	0	0	3	1	4	Report
