= Boccia at the 2023 European Para Championships =

Sport event

- Venue: Rotterdam Ahoy
- Location: Rotterdam, Netherlands
- Start date: 8 August
- End date: 13 August

Boccia at the 2023 European Para Championships in Rotterdam, Netherlands will be held between 8 and 13 August. There will be four men's and women's individual events, one mixed team event and two mixed pair events.

The winners of the mixed events will gain a qualification slot for the 2024 Summer Paralympics.

== Medalists ==
Event	Gold	Silver	Bronze
Men's individual BC1	Daniel Perez; Netherlands	David Smith; Great Britain	André Ramos; Portugal
Men's individual BC2	Nadav Levi; Israel	Róbert Mezík; Slovakia	Francis Rombouts; Belgium
Men's individual BC3	Grigorios Polychronidis; Greece	Will Arnott; Great Britain	Damian Iskrzycki; Poland
Men's individual BC4	Davor Komar; Croatia	Radek Prochazka; Czech Republic	Stephen McGuire; Great Britain
Women's individual BC1	Amagoia Arrieta; Spain	Kinga Koza; Poland	Bat-el Breitman Hacoen; Israel
Women's individual BC2	Chantal van Engelen; Netherlands	Ana Catarina Correia; Portugal	Claire Taggart; Great Britain
Women's individual BC3	Sonia Heckel; France	Edyta Owczarz; Poland	Maria Bjurström; Sweden
Women's individual BC4	Carla Oliveira; Portugal	Alexandra Szabo; Hungary	Chrysi Morfi Metzou; Greece
Mixed team BC1-BC2	Netherlands	Great Britain	Portugal
Mixed pairs BC3	Czech Republic	Poland	Greece
Mixed pairs BC4	Ukraine	Great Britain	Portugal

== Medal table ==
Rank	Nation	Gold	Silver	Bronze	Total
1	Netherlands	3	0	0	3
2	Portugal	1	1	3	5
3	Czech Republic	1	1	0	2
4	Greece	1	0	2	3
5	Israel	1	0	1	2
6	Croatia	1	0	0	1
6	France	1	0	0	1
6	Spain	1	0	0	1
6	Ukraine	1	0	0	1
10	Great Britain	0	4	2	6
11	Poland	0	3	1	4
12	Hungary	0	1	0	1
12	Slovakia	0	1	0	1
14	Belgium	0	0	1	1
14	Sweden	0	0	1	1
Totals (15 entries)		11	11	11	33
