= Kayleigh Haggo =

Scottish boccia player and para athlete

Personal information
- Born: 1 February 1999 (age 27) Irvine, North Ayrshire, Scotland, U.K.

Sport
- Sport: Para swimming (2014–2018); Para athletics (Frame running) (2012–2014, 2018–2020); Boccia (2022–present)
- Disability class: BC2
Medal record
Representing United Kingdom
Paralympic athletics
World Championships
| Gold medal – first place | 2019 Dubai | 100 m RR3 |

Kayleigh Haggo (born 1 February 1999) is a Scottish boccia player, frame runner, and para swimmer. She represented Great Britain at the 2024 Summer Paralympics in Paris in boccia in the women's individual and mixed team events.

== Early life and education ==
Haggo was born in Irvine and grew up in Ayr. Although she attended a mainstream school growing up, Haggo was not involved in school sports, as school staff were unsure how to accommodate her cerebral palsy.

She attended Ayrshire College, where she studied Coaching and Developing Sport.

== Athletic career ==
As of 2024, Haggo works as a Disability Inclusion Trainer for Scottish Disability Sport, and runs trainings for PE teachers on how to accommodate disabled students. She previously worked in South Ayrshire, where she was an Active Schools coordinator beginning in 2021. She also runs Inspire, an organization which serves disabled children and young adults involved with sport.

=== Para athletics ===
Haggo began frame running at age 12, and would travel to Glasgow weekly to train. By age 13, she was competing internationally in the sport. At the 2012 European Para Youth Games in Brno, Czech Republic, Haggo won three gold medals. She also attended the 2012 Summer Olympics in London as a spectator, which sparked her goal of competing at the Paralympics.

After several years as a para swimmer, Haggo returned to frame running in 2018, when the sport was taken up by World Para Athletics. She represented Great Britain at the 2018 European Para Athletics Championships. In 2019, she won the inaugural women's 100m RR3 event at the World Para Athletics Championships in Dubai with a time of 18:32. In 2021, she won a gold medal in frame running at the Para-athletics European Championships in Poland.

Haggo hoped to attend the Paralympics as a frame runner, but the event was not included in the 2024 Summer Paralympics lineup. As of 2024, she remains the world record holder for frame running in the 100, 200, 400, 800, 1500 and 5000 metre events.

=== Para swimming ===
Haggo took up para swimming for four years between 2014 and 2018, in part because the discipline was not included in World Para Athletics' program.

=== Boccia ===
Haggo began playing boccia in February 2022, driven by the desire to compete at the Paralympics after frame running was announced to not be included in the event's 2024 lineup. She competed in the Scottish Championship a few months later. She first competed internationally in Poznan in August 2022.

She became a full-time player in 2023 as part of the United Kingdom's World Class Programme, which provides funding to athletes, allowing them to train full-time. That year she competed in the Montreal World Cup, where she won bronze in the BC1/2 team event.

In 2024, Haggo won gold medals in the women's individual event and the BC1/2 Team event at the Lahti Challenger in Finland. She was named to Great Britain's Paralympic boccia team in June 2024. At the Paralympics, she reached the quarterfinals in the women's BC2 individual event and the mixed team BC1-2 event.

== Honours ==
In 2017, YMCA Scotland named her on their list of 30 most inspiring women under 30. In 2020, Haggo was nominated for Sports Personality of the Year at the South Ayrshire Sports Awards. She received the Young Scot Health & Wellbeing Award in 2021. In 2022 she was inducted into Ayrshire College's College Hall of Fame.

In September 2024, Haggo was one of the hundred recipients of an Eric Liddell Pin Badge.

== Personal life ==
Haggo has quadriplegic cerebral palsy with dystonia. In 2015, changed Department for Work and Pensions disability benefit rules meant Haggo might lose her motability vehicle. Around 2,900 people signed a Change.org petition in support of Haggo.

She lived in Maybole with her mother as of 2020. During the COVID-19 pandemic, town residents raised money to buy Haggo equipment so she could train at her home.

Haggo plans to marry her fiancé, Kevin, in late 2024.
