= Hiromi Endo (boccia) =

Japanese boccia player (born 1986)

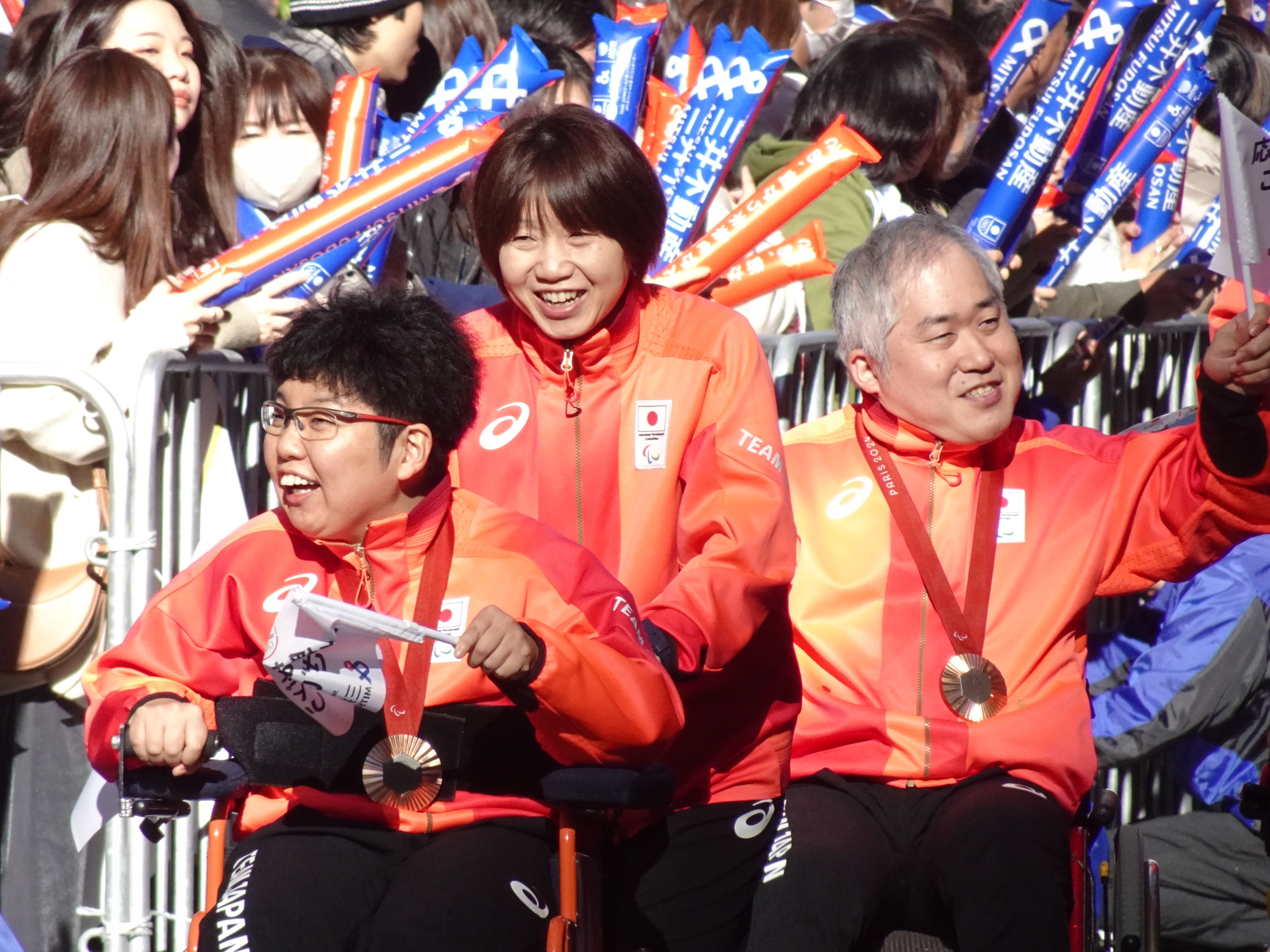
- Hiromi Endo (left) at Paris 2024 Summer Olympians and Paralympians Japan National Team parade event on November 30th, 2024, with her mother Satomi Endo (center)

Personal information
- Born: July 14, 1986 (age 39) Fukushima, Fukushima, Japan

Sport
- Country: Japan
- Sport: Boccia
- Disability class: BC1
Medal record
Boccia
Representing Japan
Paralympic Games
Bronze medal – third place	2024 Paris	Women's Individual BC1
World Championships
Bronze medal – third place	2022 Rio de Janeiro	Team BC1/2

Hiromi Endo (born 14 July 1986) is a Japanese boccia player. She is a bronze medalist at the Boccia World Championships and the Summer Paralympics.

Endo was a member of Japanese team that won bronze in the 2022 Boccia World Championships held in Rio de Janeiro, in the Team BC1/2 event. At the Montreal World Boccia Cup in 2024, Endo lost to Jeralyn Tan in the final. She competed in the 2024 Summer Paralympics in Paris. In the women's individual BC1 event, Endo was drawn to Pool C alongside Yushae DeSilva-Andrade. The two women advanced from their pool and reached the semifinals, where they had lost to Tan and Aurélie Aubert respectively. In the bronze medal match, Endo defeated DeSilva-Andrade, thus securing her first Paralympic medal.
