= Boccia at the 2020 Summer Paralympics – Mixed individual BC1 =

Boccia – Mixed individual BC1 at the XVI Paralympic Games
- Venue: Ariake Gymnastics Centre
- Date: 28 August - 1 September 2021
- Competitors: 19 from 13 nations

Medalists
1st place, gold medalist(s)		David Smith	Great Britain
2nd place, silver medalist(s)		Chew Wei Lun	Malaysia
3rd place, bronze medalist(s)		José Carlos Chagas de Oliveira	Brazil

The mixed individual BC1 boccia event at the 2020 Summer Paralympics will be contested between 28 August and 1 September 2021 at the Ariake Gymnastics Centre. This event is a mixed event; 19 male and female players from 13 nations will be competing.

The event structure is the same as the 2016 event, with pool stages. The top two players from each of four pools then entered into a quarter-final single-elimination stage, with the losing semifinalists playing off for bronze.

== Results ==
=== Final stage ===
The final stage (or knockout stage) will be played between 31 August and 1 September.

Quarter-finals
Jose Carlos Chagas (BRA)	6
Daniel Perez (NED)	2
David Smith (GBR)	6
Witsanu Huadpradit (THA)	1
Mikhail Gutnik (RPC)	2
Andre Ramos (POR)	4
Chew Wei Lun (MAS)	4
Zhang Qi (CHN)	2

Semi-finals
Jose Carlos Chagas (BRA)	4
David Smith (GBR)	7
Andre Ramos (POR)	5
Chew Wei Lun (MAS)	9

Finals
David Smith (GBR)	4
Chew Wei Lun (MAS)	2
Third place match
Jose Carlos Chagas (BRA)	8
Andre Ramos (POR)	2

=== Pool ===
The pools (or can be known as a group stage) will be played between 28 and 30 August 2021. The top two players in each pool will qualify to the quarterfinals.

==== Pool A ====
Athlete	Pld	W	L	PW	PA	Diff	Qualification
David Smith (GBR)	4	3	1	27	12	+15	Advance to quarter-finals
Zhang Qi (CHN)	4	3	1	17	13	+4	Advance to quarter-finals
Eduardo Sanchez Reyes (MEX)	4	2	2	23	16	+7	
Takumi Nakamura (JPN)	4	1	3	12	31	-19	
Mauricio Ibarbure (ARG)	4	1	3	14	21	-7	

Date	Time	Player 1	Score	Player 2
28 August	10:40	David Smith (United Kingdom)	7–1	(China) Zhang Qi
28 August	10:40	Takumi Nakamura (Japan)	8–5	(Argentina) Mauricio Ibarbure
29 August	10:40	David Smith (United Kingdom)	4–3	(Argentina) Mauricio Ibarbure
29 August	10:40	Eduardo Sanchez Reyes (Mexico)	3–5	(China) Zhang Qi
29 August	17:10	David Smith (United Kingdom)	5-7	(Mexico) Eduardo Sanchez Reyes
29 August	17:10	Takumi Nakamura (Japan)	2-6	(China) Zhang Qi
30 August	10:40	Takumi Nakamura (Japan)	1-9	(Mexico) Eduardo Sanchez Reyes
30 August	10:40	Mauricio Ibarbure (Argentina)	1-5	(China) Zhang Qi
30 August	17:10	David Smith (United Kingdom)	11-1	(Japan) Takumi Nakamura
30 August	17:10	Eduardo Sanchez Reyes (Mexico)	4-5	(Argentina) Mauricio Ibarbure

==== Pool B ====
Athlete	Pld	W	L	PW	PA	Diff	Qualification
Chew Wei Lun (MAS)	4	4	0	28	8	+20	Advance to quarter-finals
Witsanu Huadpradit (THA)	4	3	1	20	13	+7	Advance to quarter-finals
Jung Sung Joon (KOR)	4	2	2	17	16	+1	
Katerina Curinova (CZE)	4	1	3	9	29	-20	
Andreza Vitoria de Oliveira (BRA)	4	0	4	9	17	-8	

Date	Time	Player 1	Score	Player 2
28 August	10:40	Jung Sung Joon (South Korea)	8–2	(Czech Republic) Katerina Curinova
28 August	10:40	Andreza Vitoria de Oliveira (Brazil)	4–5	(Thailand) Witsanu Huadpradit
28 August	17:10	Andreza Vitoria de Oliveira (Brazil)	2–5	(Malaysia) Chew Wei Lun
28 August	17:10	Witsanu Huadpradit (Thailand)	9–4	(Czech Republic) Katerina Curinova
29 August	10:40	Jung Sung Joon (South Korea)	4–2	(Brazil) Andreza Vitoria de Oliveira
29 August	10:40	Chew Wei Lun (Malaysia)	3 (1)–3 (0)	(Thailand) Witsanu Huadpradit
29 August	17:10	Katerina Curinova (Czech Republic)	3-1	(Brazil) Andreza Vitoria de Oliveira
29 August	17:10	Chew Wei Lun (Malaysia)	9-3	(South Korea) Jung Sung Joon
30 August	17:10	Witsanu Huadpradit (Thailand)	3-2	(South Korea) Jung Sung Joon
30 August	17:10	Katerina Curinova (Czech Republic)	0-11	(Malaysia) Chew Wei Lun

==== Pool C ====
Athlete	Pld	W	L	PW	PA	Diff	Qualification
Mikhail Gutnik (RPC)	4	3	1	23	11	+12	Advance to quarter-finals
Daniel Perez (NED)	4	3	1	34	13	+21	Advance to quarter-finals
Olga Dolgova (RPC)	4	2	2	12	14	-2	
Guilherme Moraes (BRA)	4	1	3	9	22	-13	
Subin Tipmanee (THA)	4	1	3	8	26	-18	

Date	Time	Player 1	Score	Player 2
28 August	10:40	Daniel Perez (Netherlands)	13–1	(Brazil) Guilherme Moraes
28 August	10:40	Olga Dolgova (Russia)	3–1	(Russia) Mikhail Gutnik
28 August	17:10	Mikhail Gutnik (Russia)	11–1	(Thailand) Subin Tipmanee
28 August	17:10	Olga Dolgova (Russia)	5–6	(Netherlands) Daniel Perez
29 August	10:40	Olga Dolgova (Russia)	4–1	(Brazil) Guilherme Moraes
29 August	10:40	Subin Tipmanee (Thailand)	0–11	(Netherlands) Daniel Perez
30 August	10:40	Guilherme Moraes (Brazil)	3-4	(Russia) Mikhail Gutnik
30 August	10:40	Subin Tipmanee (Thailand)	6-0	(Russia) Olga Dolgova
30 August	17:10	Daniel Perez (Netherlands)	4-7	(Russia) Mikhail Gutnik
30 August	17:10	Guilherme Moraes (Brazil)	4-1	(Thailand) Subin Tipmanee

==== Pool D ====
Athlete	Pld	W	L	PW	PA	Diff	Qualification
Jose Carlos Chagas de Oliveira (BRA)	3	3	0	15	5	+10	Advance to quarter-finals
Andre Ramos (POR)	3	2	1	17	7	+10	Advance to quarter-finals
Tomáš Kráľ (SVK)	3	1	2	7	17	-10	
Yuriko Fujii (JPN)	3	0	3	5	15	-10	

Date	Time	Player 1	Score	Player 2
28 August	17:10	Jose Carlos Chagas de Oliveira (Brazil)	6–1	(Portugal) Andre Ramos
28 August	17:10	Yuriko Fujii (Japan)	2–5	(Slovakia) Tomáš Král
29 August	17:10	Jose Carlos Chagas de Oliveira (Brazil)	5-2	(Japan) Yuriko Fujii
29 August	17:10	Andre Ramos (Portugal)	11-0	(Slovakia) Tomáš Král
30 August	10:40	Yuriko Fujii (Japan)	1-5	(Portugal) Andre Ramos
30 August	10:40	Tomáš Král (Slovakia)	2-4	(Brazil) Jose Carlos Chagas de Oliveira
