= Francis Rombouts (boccia) =

Belgian Paralympic swimmer

Personal information
- Born: 11 February 1984 (age 42) India

Sport
- Sport: Boccia
- Disability class: BC2
- Coached by: Bas Van Dycke; Wesley Deleu
Medal record
Boccia
Representing Belgium
Boccia European Championships
Silver medal – second place	2005 Póvoa de Varzim	Men's individual BC2
European Para Championships
Bronze medal – third place	2023 Rotterdam	Men's individual BC2

Francis Rombouts (born 11 February 1984) is a Belgian Paralympic boccia player of Indian descent. He competes in classification BC2.

== Biography ==
Rombouts was born in India with cerebral palsy and was adopted at the age of 18 months by a Belgian family. He started playing Boccia at the age of 12 at Parantee-Psylosclub IE Sport at the insistence of club administrator Jo De Becker who was also a teacher at Rombouts's school, "VIBO De Brem", a special education school in Oud-Turnhout. He is a member of Spinnaker in Ekeren, Belgium, a sporting club associated with Heder, an institution for children, youngsters and adults with a mental or physical disability. His chosen nickname is "Blackjack", a reference to the white ball or "jack" associated with Boccia and the dark colour of his skin.

== Personal ==
Rombouts lives in Tielen.

== Competitions ==
His first international competition was in 1989 in Mar del Plata, Argentina.

Rombouts considers his 2nd place at the European Championships in 2005 to be his best performance ever.

He quit the sport in 2007 but, after a hiatus of 10 years, he returned to the sport and won a bronze medal at the 2023 European Para Championships in Rotterdam, the Netherlands.

His best result at the Boccia World Championships came in 2022 in Rio de Janeiro, Brazil when he finished just outside the medals losing in the bronze medal match to world number 2, Thailand's Watcharaphon Vongsa.

Rombouts' big dream, to qualify for Summer Paralympics, was thwarted in 2000 and 2004 but became a reality after he returned to the sport in 2017 when he was selected for the 2020 and 2024 Summer Paralympics. In Tokyo, he was eliminated at the group stage after losing his first two games, the second one against world number 1, Thailand's Worawut Saengampa.
