= Boccia at the 2015 ASEAN Para Games =

Boccia at the 2015 ASEAN Para Games was held at OCBC Arena, Singapore.

== Medal table ==
* Host nation (Singapore)

Rank	Nation	Gold	Silver	Bronze	Total
1	Thailand (THA)	7	2	3	12
2	Malaysia (MAS)	0	2	1	3
3	Singapore (SIN)*	0	2	0	2
4	Myanmar (MYA)	0	0	1	1
Totals (4 entries)		7	6	5	18

== Medalists ==
Event	Gold	Silver	Bronze
Individual BC1	Witsanu Huadpradit; Thailand	Chew Wei Lun; Malaysia	Pattaya Tadtong; Thailand
Individual BC2	Watcharaphon Vongsa; Thailand	Worawut Saengampa; Thailand	Mohammad Syafiq bin Mohd Noh; Malaysia
Team BC1/BC2	Thailand (THA); Pattaya Tadtong; Witsanu Huadpradit; Thinnakorn Thepdaeng; Watcharaphon Vongsa; Worawut Saengampa	Malaysia (MAS); Lee Chee Hoong; Lean Chin Kit; Mohammad Syafiq bin Mohd Noh; Chew Wei Lun; Mohamed Shahrul Rafiq Maula Mustafa	Myanmar (MYA); Yu Yatanar Tun; Aung San Myint; Min Min Htike
Individual BC3	Tanimpat Visaratanunta; Thailand	Toh Sze Ning; Singapore	Somboon Chaipanich; Thailand
Pair BC3	Thailand (THA); Tanimpat Visaratanunta; Somboon Chaipanich; Ekkarat Chaemchoi	Singapore (SIN); Nurulasyiqah binte Mohammad Taha; Toh Sze Ning; Lim Yu Fei Faye	-
Individual BC4	Chaloemphon Tanbut; Thailand	Ritthikrai Somsanuk; Thailand	Pornchok Larpyen; Thailand
Pair BC4	Thailand (THA); Pornchok Larpyen; Chaloemphon Tanbut; Ritthikrai Somsanuk	-	-
