= Bermuda at the 2004 Summer Paralympics =

- IPC code: BER
- NPC: Bermuda Paralympic Association

in Athens
- Competitors: 2 in 1 sport
- Flag bearer: Sandra Mitchell
- Medals: Gold 0 Silver 0 Bronze 0 Total 0

Summer Paralympics appearances (overview)
- 1996; 2000; 2004; 2008; 2012; 2016; 2020; 2024

Bermuda competed at the 2004 Summer Paralympics in Athens, Greece. The team included two athletes, both of them female, and won no medals.

== Sports ==
=== Equestrian ===
| Athlete | Event | Total | |
| Athlete | Event | Score | Rank |
|---|---|---|---|
| Kirsty Anderson | Mixed individual championship test grade IV | DNS | |
| Kirsty Anderson | Mixed individual freestyle test grade IV | DNS | |
| Sandra Mitchell | Mixed individual championship test grade I | 53.895 | 16 |
| Sandra Mitchell | Mixed individual freestyle test grade I | 55.188 | 15 |

== See also ==
- Bermuda at the Paralympics
- Bermuda at the 2004 Summer Olympics
