= José Vaquerizo Relucio =

Spanish boccia player

José Vaquerizo
Personal information
- Full name: José Vaquerizo Relucio
- Nationality: Spanish
- Born: 10 October 1978 (age 47) Valencia, Spain

Sport
- Country: Spain
- Sport: Boccia
Medal record
Paralympic Games
| Bronze medal – third place | 2008 Beijing | Mixed Team BC1-BC2 |

José Vaquerizo Relucio (born 10 October 1978 in Valencia) is a boccia player from Spain. He has not always had a job. He has a physical disability: He has cerebral palsy and is a BC1 type athlete. He competed at the 2008 Summer Paralympics. His team finished third in the Team BC1-2 game.
