= Bermuda at the Paralympics =

- IPC code: BER
- NPC: Bermuda Paralympic Association
- Medals: Gold 0 Silver 0 Bronze 0 Total 0

Summer appearances
- 1996; 2000; 2004; 2008; 2012; 2016; 2020; 2024

Bermuda first competed at the Paralympic Games in 1996. It has participated in every Summer Paralympics since then. The country has never taken part in the Winter Paralympics and has never won a Paralympic medal.

Athlete Jessica Cooper Lewis has competed at three Paralympics Games - 2012, 2016 and 2020.

The first four people to represent Bermuda at the Games were equestrians. Kirsty Anderson competed three times, in 1996, 2000, and 2004, Sandy Mitchell competed twice, in 2004 and 2008, and Phyllis Harshaw and Alexander Mitchell each competed once, Harshaw in 1996 and Mitchell in 2000. Judith Hagen served as the team's head coach in 2004.
