= Will Arnott =

British boccia player (1999–2024)

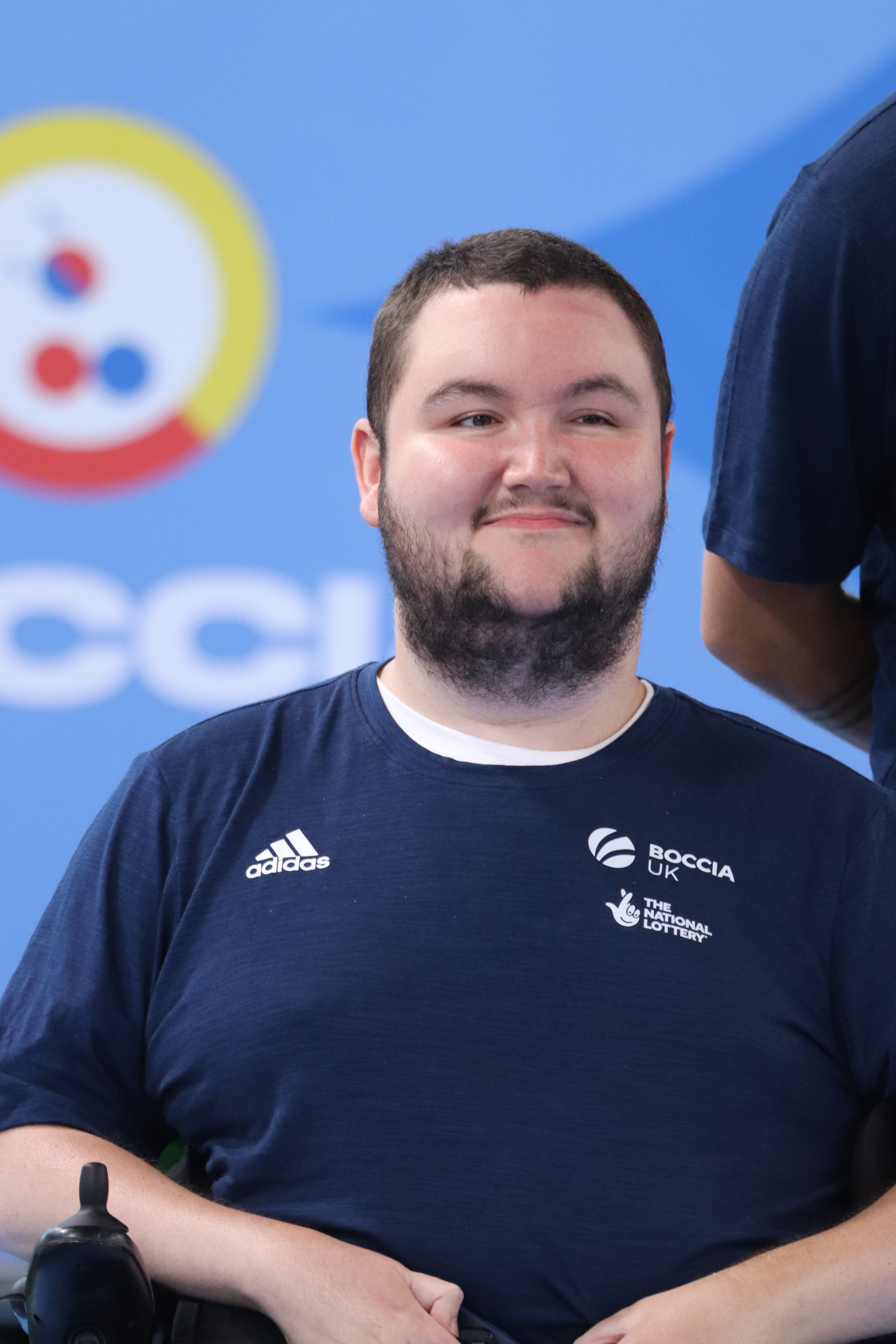
- Will Arnott at European Boccia Championship, 2023

Personal information
- Born: 12 March 1999 Reading, Berkshire, England
- Died: 9 December 2024 (aged 25) Arborfield, England

Sport
- Country: United Kingdom
- Sport: Boccia
- Disability class: BC3

Will Arnott (12 March 1999 – 9 December 2024) was a British Paralympian who made his Paralympic debut in boccia at the 2024 Summer Paralympics in Paris.

Arnott was diagnosed with muscular dystrophy at the age of five. He attended Treloar School.

Arnott initially competed in the BC4 classification, but after surgery at the age of 15 was unable to throw anymore so switched to compete in the BC3 classification using a ramp. He first represented the UK Boccia team at 2019 Zagreb Regional Open, where he won a silver medal alongside ramp assistant Connor Wellfare. The pair competed at the 2022 World Championships in Rio de Janeiro where they reached the quarter-finals, but were defeated by the Paralympic Champion Adam Peska of Czech Republic.

In August 2023 he won silver at the European Para Championships in the men's individual competition.

He secured a qualifying spot for the 2024 Paralympics by winning gold in the BC3 Pairs category at the qualifying tournament in Portugal alongside Sally Kidson in March 2024. The pair lost their opening two games, 7–0 to Greece and 4–3 to Peru, but then beat the hosts 4-1 and Singapore 4–1 to reach the semi-finals where they defeated Poland 5–4. In the final they defeated Japan 4–2.

Arnott died on 9 December 2024, at the age of 25, while ranked world number 7 and GB number 1.
