= Radek Procházka =

Czech ice hockey player

- Born: January 6, 1978 (age 48) Prostějov, Czechoslovakia
- Height: 5 ft 9 in (175 cm)
- Weight: 181 lb (82 kg; 12 st 13 lb)
- Position: Centre
- Shot: Left
- Played for: HC Olomouc; HC Karlovy Vary; HC Havířov Panthers; HC Plzeň; VHK Vsetín; HC Vítkovice; HC Znojemsti Orli; HC Kometa Brno
- Playing career: 1995–2015

Radek Procházka (born 6 January 1978 in Prostějov) is a Czech former professional ice hockey player.

Procházka played in the Czech Extraliga for HC Olomouc, HC Karlovy Vary, HC Femax Havířov, HC Keramika Plzeň, VHK Vsetín, HC Vítkovice, HC Znojemští Orli and HC Kometa Brno.
