= Beijing North Star =

State-owned conglomerate enterprise

Beijing North Star Company Limited 北京北辰实业股份有限公司
- Company type: public
Traded as
SSE: 601588	(A share)
SEHK: 588	(H share)
- Industry: Conglomerate
- Founded: 1997; 29 years ago
- Headquarters: Beijing, China
- Area served: China
- Key people: Chairman: Mr. He Jiangchuan
- Website: www.beijingns.com.cn

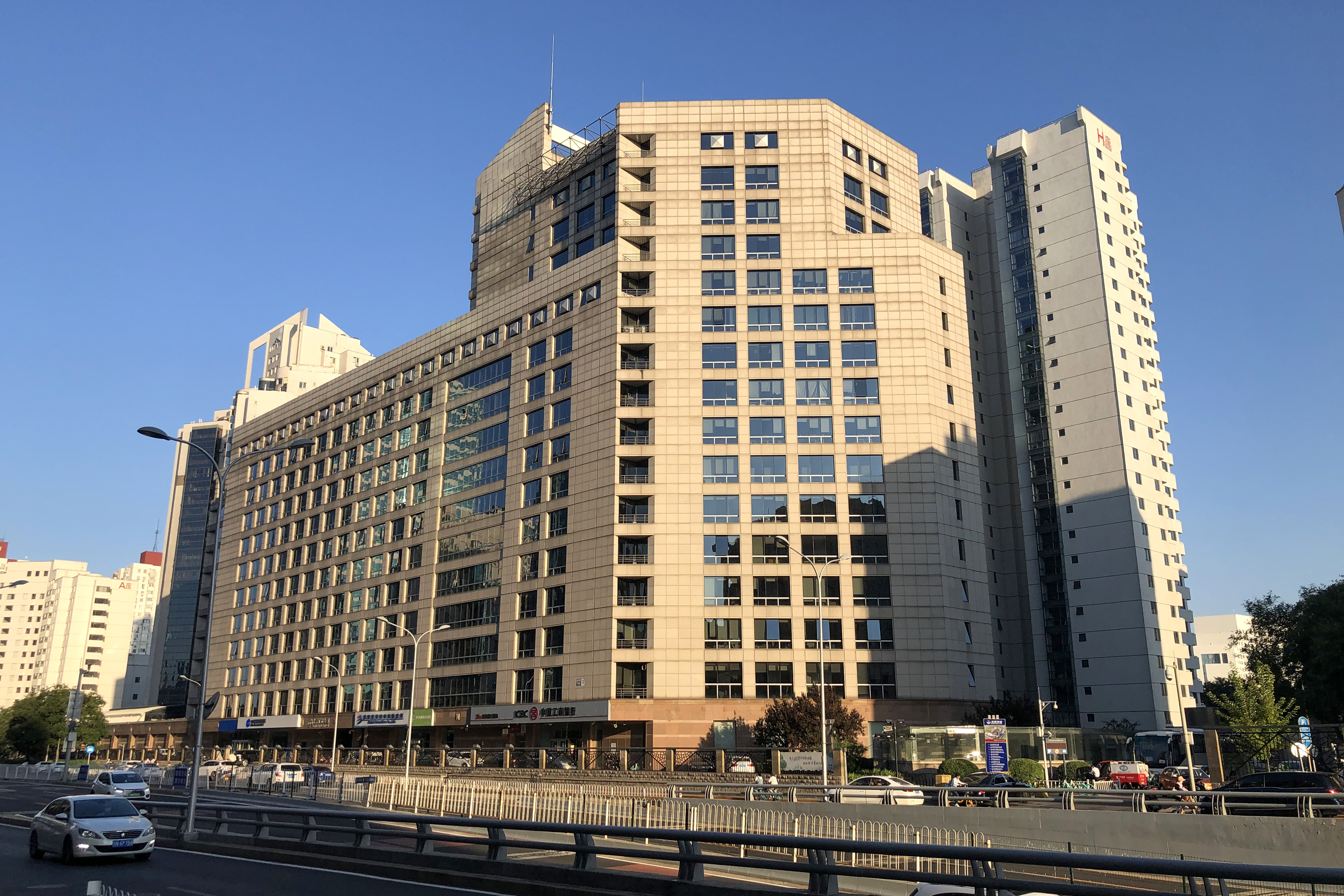
Headquarters of North Star Group

Beijing North Star Company Limited is a state-owned conglomerate enterprise in Beijing, China. It is engaged in property management, property development, and retailing. It was established in 1997. Its H shares were listed on the Hong Kong Stock Exchange in 1997 and its A shares were listed on the Shanghai Stock Exchange in 2006.
