= Bermuda at the 2012 Summer Paralympics =

- IPC code: BER
- NPC: Bermuda Paralympic Association

in London
- Competitors: 1 in 1 sport
- Medals: Gold 0 Silver 0 Bronze 0 Total 0

Summer Paralympics appearances (overview)
- 1996; 2000; 2004; 2008; 2012; 2016; 2020; 2024

Bermuda competed at the 2012 Summer Paralympics in London, United Kingdom from August 29 to September 9, 2012.

== Athletics ==
Women's track

Athlete	Event	Result	Rank
Jessica Cooper Lewis	100m T53	19.38	8
Jessica Cooper Lewis	200m T53	34.76	8
Jessica Cooper Lewis	400m T53	1:08.88	8

== See also ==
- Bermuda at the Paralympics
- Bermuda at the 2012 Summer Olympics
