= Bermuda at the 2020 Summer Paralympics =

- IPC code: BER
- NPC: Bermuda Paralympic Association
- Competitors: 1 in 1 sport
- Flag bearer: Jessica Cooper Lewis
- Medals: Gold 0 Silver 0 Bronze 0 Total 0

Summer Paralympics appearances (overview)
- 1996; 2000; 2004; 2008; 2012; 2016; 2020; 2024

Bermuda competed at the 2020 Summer Paralympics in Tokyo, Japan, from 25 August to 6 September 2020. This was their seventh consecutive appearance at the Summer Paralympics since 1996.

== Athletics ==
Bermuda have qualified quotas for athletics.

PB: Personal Best | DNA: Did not advance

Athlete	Heats	Qualification		Final	
Athlete	Heats	Score	Rank	Score	Rank
Jessica Cooper Lewis	Women's 100 m T53	N/A		16.90 SB	4
Jessica Cooper Lewis	Women's 400 m T53	1:01.71	5	DNA	10
Jessica Cooper Lewis	Women's 800 m T53	1:57.77 PB	6	DNA	10

== See also ==
- Bermuda at the Paralympics
- Bermuda at the 2020 Summer Olympics
