= Chew Wei Lun =

Malaysian boccia player (born 1995)

Personal information
- Nickname: Wei Lun
- Born: 26 August 1995 (age 30) Johor Bahru, Johor, Malaysia

Sport
- Sport: Boccia
- Disability class: BC1
- Coached by: Aiman Hafizi Abu Bakar
Medal record
Boccia
Representing Malaysia
Paralympic Games
Silver medal – second place	2020 Tokyo	Individual BC1
World Open
Silver medal – second place	2019 Hong Kong	Individual BC1
ASEAN Para Games
Silver medal – second place	2017 Kuala Lumpur	Team BC1/BC2
Silver medal – second place	2015 Singapore	Individual BC1
Silver medal – second place	2015 Singapore	Team BC1/BC2
Silver medal – second place	2014 Naypyidaw	Team BC1/BC2

Chew Wei Lun (simplified Chinese: 周伟伦; traditional Chinese: 周偉倫; pinyin: Zhōu Wěilún; Jyutping: Zau1 Wai5 Leon4; Pe̍h-ōe-jī: Chiu Úi-lûn; born 26 August 1995) is a Malaysian boccia player.

At the 2020 Summer Paralympics, he won the silver medal in the individual BC1 event, thus becoming the first Malaysian to win a medal in boccia.
