= Bermuda at the 2008 Summer Paralympics =

- IPC code: BER
- NPC: Bermuda Paralympic Association

in Beijing
- Competitors: 1 in 1 sport
- Medals: Gold 0 Silver 0 Bronze 0 Total 0

Summer Paralympics appearances (overview)
- 1996; 2000; 2004; 2008; 2012; 2016; 2020; 2024

Bermuda took part in the 2008 Summer Paralympics in Beijing, People's Republic of China. The country's delegation consisted of a single competitor, equestrian Sandy Mitchell. Mitchell participated in two events and did not win a medal.

== Equestrian ==
Athlete	Horse	Event	Points	Rank
Sandy Mitchell	Highland Fling	Mixed dressage - Championship grade Ia	56.600	10
Sandy Mitchell	Highland Fling	Mixed dressage - Freestyle grade Ia	59.500	11

== See also ==
- Bermuda at the Paralympics
- Bermuda at the 2008 Summer Olympics
