= Muhammad Bintang Satria Herlangga =

Indonesian boccia player

Muhammad Herlangga
Personal information
- Born: July 14, 2002 (age 24) Bekasi, Indonesia

Sport
- Country: Indonesia
- Sport: Boccia
- Disability class: BC2
Medal record
Boccia
Representing Indonesia
Paralympic Games
Silver medal – second place	2024 Paris	Individual BC2
Asian Para Games
Silver medal – second place	2022 Hangzhou	Team BC1–2
ASEAN Para Games
Silver medal – second place	2022 Surakarta	Team BC1–2
Silver medal – second place	2023 Cambodia	Team BC1–2

Muhammad Bintang Satria Herlangga (born 14 July 2002) is an Indonesian boccia player. He is a silver medalist at the ASEAN Para Games, Asian Para Games and at the Summer Paralympics.

Herlangga participated at the 2024 Summer Paralympics in the boccia competition. In the men's individual BC2 event, he reached the gold medal match.
