= Subin Tipmanee =

Thai Paralympic boccia player

Personal information
- Born: 11 March 1982 (age 44) Loei, Thailand

Sport
- Sport: Boccia
- Disability class: BC1
Medal record
Paralympic Games
Gold medal – first place	2016 Rio de Janeiro	Team BC1–2
Gold medal – first place	2020 Tokyo	Team BC1–2
Asian Para Games
Gold medal – first place	2018 Jakarta	Team BC1–2

Subin Tipmanee (Thai: สุบิน ทิพย์มะณี) is a Thai boccia player who represented Thailand at the 2016 Summer Paralympics. She, along with her 3 teammates, won a gold medal in Boccia in the Mixed Team BC1–2 event.
