= Gischa Zayana =

Indonesian boccia player (born 2005)

Personal information
- Born: 3 May 2005 (age 21) Surakarta, Central Java, Indonesia

Sport
- Sport: Boccia
- Disability class: BC2
Medal record
Women's boccia
Representing Indonesia
Paralympic Games
Silver medal – second place	2024 Paris	Team BC1–2
Bronze medal – third place	2024 Paris	Individual BC2
World Cup
Gold medal – first place	2024 Montreal	Team BC1–2
Asian Para Games
Gold medal – first place	2026 Aichi–Nagoya	Individual BC2
Gold medal – first place	2026 Aichi–Nagoya	Team BC1–2
ASEAN Para Games
Gold medal – first place	2023 Cambodia	Individual BC2
Silver medal – second place	2022 Surakarta	Individual BC2

Gischa Zayana (born 3 May 2005) is an Indonesian boccia player. She competed at the 2024 Summer Paralympics and won the bronze medal in the women's individual BC2 event.
