= Bermuda at the 2016 Summer Paralympics =

- IPC code: BER
- NPC: Bermuda Paralympic Association

in Rio de Janeiro
- Competitors: 2 in 2 sports
- Medals: Gold 0 Silver 0 Bronze 0 Total 0

Summer Paralympics appearances (overview)
- 1996; 2000; 2004; 2008; 2012; 2016; 2020; 2024

Bermuda competed at the 2016 Summer Paralympics in Rio de Janeiro, Brazil, from 7 September to 18 September 2016.

== Delegation ==
Bermuda sent a team of two athletes, both female, to the 2016 Summer Paralympics. Yushae Desilva-Andrade competed in boccia, while Jessica Cooper Lewis competed in athletics.

== Athletics ==
Women's Track

Athlete	Events	Heat		Final	
Athlete	Events	Time	Rank	Time	Rank
Jessica Cooper Lewis	100 m T53	17.42	4 Q	17.25	6
Jessica Cooper Lewis	400 m T53	1:00.25	6	did not advance	
Jessica Cooper Lewis	800 m T52-53	1:58.24	6	did not advance	

== Boccia ==
Athlete	Event	Pool matches			Quarterfinals	Semifinals	Final / BM	
Athlete	Event	Opposition Score	Opposition Score	Rank	Opposition Score	Opposition Score	Opposition Score	Rank
Yushae Desilva-Andrade	Mixed individual BC2	Sohn (KOR); L 0–7	Levi (ISR); D 2–2	3	did not advance			

== See also ==
- Bermuda at the 2016 Summer Olympics
