= Manuel Ángel Martín =

Spanish boccia player (born 1980)

Personal information
- Full name: Manuel Ángel Martín Pérez
- Nickname: Manolo
- Nationality: Spanish
- Born: January 30, 1980 (age 46) Pórtugos, Granada, Spain

Sport
- Country: Spain
- Sport: Boccia
- Disability class: BC2
Medal record
Paralympic Games
Bronze medal – third place	2008 Beijing	Individual BC2
Bronze medal – third place	2008 Beijing	Team BC1-BC2
World Championships
Bronze medal – third place	2010 Lisbon	Team
European Championships
Silver medal – second place	2009 Póvoa de Varzim	Individual
Bronze medal – third place	2009 Póvoa de Varzim	Team

Manuel Ángel Martín Pérez (born January 30, 1980, in Pórtugos, Granada) is a Spanish boccia player who is also known as Manolo Martín. He has cerebral palsy and is a BC2 type athlete.

Martín competed at the 2008 Summer Paralympics in Beijing, China, winning bronze medals in the Individual BC2 and Team BC1-BC2 events. He also competed at the 2012 Summer Paralympics in London, England.

At the 2009 European Championships in Póvoa de Varzim, Portugal, he won a silver medal in individual competition and a bronze in the team event. The following year he won a bronze medal in team competition at the World Championships in Lisbon.

== Boccia ==
Martín is a BC2 classified boccia player. Some of his boccia competition participation has been sponsored by Granada CF and by the sports foundation "Hazlo por todos". He is a member of the Amics de la Boccia club.

Lisbon hosted the World Championships in June 2010, and Martín picked up a bronze medal in the individual competition. Elche, Spain hosted the Spanish Boccia Club Championship in June 2011, with Martín participating in the event. He finished second in the individual BC2 event while representing ASPACE Granada, Andalucía.

The Boccia World Championships were held in August 2011, and he participated. The event was part of the ranking process to qualify for the London Paralympic Games. Around Christmas time in 2011, he injured himself and doctors had a hard time identifying the injury because of existing medical conditions. The injury made it difficult for him to compete. In January 2012, he participated in a boccia training camp organized by the Spanish Cerebral Palsy Federation of Sports (FEDPC) and the Spanish Sports Federation for Persons with Physical Disabilities (FEDDF) along with 24 other boccia players from around Spain held at CRE San Andrés. The camp was part of national team preparations for the London Paralympics. Club ADM and the Sociocultural Disability Association (ASCM) organized the June 2012 Spanish national championships which he competed in. He competed at the 2012 Summer Paralympics. He lost 4–5 in the round of 16.

The third edition of the International Boccia Championships Pecanins Roser took place in 2013, with a team representing the Catalan region of Spain, a team representing the rest of Spain and a team representing Great Britain. He competed on the rest of Spain team. The event was a warm up for the European Championships. Martin won the BC2 individual event against Zoe Robinson of Great Britain by a score of 11–4 and against Benito Sánchez of Catalonia. The pair of victories qualified him for the final where he played against Spain national team teammate Pedro Cordero Martin whom he be 3-2 He was a member of Spain's delegation at the European Championships contested in June 2013 in Guimaraes, Portugal. In October 2013, he was ranked the Spain's best competitor in his classification. His team, which includes Vicente Lletí, Raul Martí and Sabrina Balen, was ranked number one.
