= Worawut Saengampa =

Thai Paralympic boccia player (born 1992)

Personal information
- Born: 23 December 1992 (age 33) Bangkok, Thailand

Sport
- Sport: Boccia
- Disability class: BC2
Medal record
Paralympic Games
Gold medal – first place	2016 Rio de Janeiro	Team BC1–2
Gold medal – first place	2020 Tokyo	Team BC1–2
Gold medal – first place	2024 Paris	Individual BC2
Silver medal – second place	2016 Rio de Janeiro	Individual BC2
Asian Para Games
Gold medal – first place	2014 Incheon	Individual BC2
Gold medal – first place	2014 Incheon	Team BC1-2
Gold medal – first place	2018 Jakarta	Team BC1–2
Gold medal – first place	2018 Jakarta	Individual BC2
Bronze medal – third place	2022 Hangzhou	Team BC1–2

Worawut Saengampa (Thai: วรวุฒิ แสงอำภา; born 23 December 1992) is a Thai boccia player who represented Thailand at the 2016 and 2020 Summer Paralympics. He, along with his three teammates, won a gold medal in Boccia in the Mixed Team BC1–2 event. He also won another silver medal in the individual event.
