= Lan Zhijian =

Chinese Paralympic boccia player

Personal information
- Born: 12 August 1991 (age 34) Yunfu, China

Sport
- Sport: Boccia
- Disability class: BC2
Medal record
Men's boccia
Representing China
Paralympic Games
Gold medal – first place	2024 Paris	Team BC1–2
Silver medal – second place	2020 Tokyo	Team BC1–2

Lan Zhijian (born 12 August 1991) is a Chinese boccia player.

== Career ==
Lan represented China at the 2020 Summer Paralympics and won a silver medal in the mixed team BC1–2 event. He again competed at the 2024 Summer Paralympics and won a gold medal in the mixed team BC1–2 event.
