= Jeralyn Tan =

Singaporean boccia player (born 1989)

Personal information
- Native name: Jeralyn Tan Yee Ting
- Born: 1 February 1989 (age 37)

Sport
- Country: Singapore
- Sport: Boccia
Medal record
Boccia
Representing Singapore
Paralympic Games
Silver medal – second place	2024 Paris	Women's individual BC1
ASEAN Para Games
Bronze medal – third place	2008 Nakhon Ratchasima	Women's individual BC2
Bronze medal – third place	2017 Kuala Lumpur	Mixed Team BC1/BC2
Bronze medal – third place	2022 Solo	Women's individual BC1
Silver medal – second place	2023 Phnom Penh	Women's individual BC1
Bronze medal – third place	2025 Nakhon Ratchasima	Women's individual BC1

Jeralyn Tan Yee Ting (born 1 February 1989) is a Singaporean Paralympian and boccia player. She competed at the 2024 Summer Paralympics, reaching the finals of the women's individual BC1 event and winning a silver medal.

In 2021, Tan won the World Boccia Asia-Oceania Regional Championship and another two World Boccia Cup titles in 2023. In 2024, Tan successfully defended her World Boccia Cup title in Montreal, Canada. However, Tan was eliminated in the quarter-finals at the World Boccia Cup in Portugal in July.

== Early life and education ==
Tan studied at the Cerebral Palsy Alliance Singapore (CPAS) School when she was eight and picked up boccia as a co-curricular activity in 2002. In 2003, she participated in the National Disability Games.

== Boccia career ==
=== 2008 ASEAN Para Games ===
In 2008, Tan competed in the 4th ASEAN Para Games in Thailand and won the bronze medal in the individual BC2 category.

Despite the small success, Tan struggled in the category and kept losing in competition. In 2015, she was reclassified as BC1, where the athlete compete with an assistant. In 2016, Yurnita Omar, who was originally the ramp assistant for former Paralympian Toh Sze Ning, who competed in the BC3 category, was transferred to the BC1 category and started working with Tan.

=== 2017 ASEAN Para Games ===
In 2017, Tan competed in the 9th ASEAN Para Games in Kuala Lumpur, Malaysia, earning a bronze medal in the Mixed Team BC1/BC2 event.

=== 2022 ASEAN Para Games ===
In 2022, Tan competed in the 11th ASEAN Para Games in Surakarta, Indonesia, earning a bronze medal in the Women's individual BC1 event.

=== 2023 ASEAN Para Games ===
In 2023, Tan competed in the 12th ASEAN Para Games in Phnom Penh, Cambodia, earning a silver medal in the Women's individual BC1 event.

=== 2024 Summer Paralympics ===
At the 2024 Summer Paralympics, Tan won the silver medal at the individual BC1 event, ranking second in the world and first in Asia. For her medal, Tan was awards S$300,000 at the Singapore National Paralympic Council's Athletes Achievement Awards on 15 October. By November 2024, Tan was ranked first in the women's BC1 category.

=== 2025 ASEAN Para Games ===
In 2025, Tan competed in the 13th ASEAN Para Games in Nakhon Ratchasima, Thailand, earning a bronze medal in the Women's individual BC1 event.
