= Aurélie Aubert =

French boccia player

Personal information
- Born: 9 June 1997 (age 29) Dreux, France

Sport
- Country: France
- Sport: Boccia
- Disability class: BC1
Medal record
Boccia
Representing France
Paralympic Games
Gold medal – first place	2024 Paris	Women's Individual BC1

Aurélie Aubert (born 9 June 1997) is a French boccia player. She is a Paralympic champion at the Summer Paralympics in 2024.

== Career ==
Aubert began playing boccia in 2010, at the age of 12 or 13. Not liking sports at that age, she says she came to boccia because the educators at the Richebourg rehabilitation center, where she was a resident, had promised her, in exchange, "lots of squares" of chocolate. There she also met Claudine Llop Cliville, then a nurse, who became her playing assistant and coach. Aubert trains twice a week, for about ten hours. She is supported in her practice by a mental trainer, video analysis and physiotherapy.

In 2023, Aubert took part in the European Boccia Championships in Rotterdam. She finished fourth in the BC1 category. Captaining the French team, she competed in the 2024 Summer Paralympics in Paris. She qualified for the women's individual BC1 final by eliminating Bermudian Yushae DeSilva-Andrade in a tie-break. She then won the gold medal by beating Singaporean Jeralyn Tan in the final, despite an error at the end of the match; she refused the last three balls, wrongly believing that her opponent had no more. She still won the game 2–0, 5-0 and 5–3. This was the very first French Paralympic medal in the sport and the first international title of her career for Aubert. She said she hoped that her victory would give more visibility to boccia. She was named flag bearer of the French delegation for the closing ceremony of the Paralympic Games alongside shooter Tanguy de La Forest.

Aubert is a member of the Win'27 disabled sports club in Aubevoye, Eure.

== Personal life ==
Aubert has cerebral palsy due to a lack of oxygen at birth. She lives in a foster family.
