= Yuriko Fujii =

Japanese boccia player

Personal information
- Born: 1 December 1972 (age 53)

Sport
- Sport: Boccia
Medal record
Representing Japan
Paralympic Games
Silver medal – second place	2016 Rio de Janeiro	Mixed pairs BC1-2
Bronze medal – third place	2020 Tokyo	Mixed team BC1-2
Asian Para Games
Bronze medal – third place	2018 Jakarta	Mixed team BC1-2

Yuriko Fujii (born 1 December 1972) is a Japanese boccia player. She won a silver medal at the 2016 Summer Paralympics in the mixed pairs BC1-2 boccia event and a bronze medal at the 2020 Summer Paralympics in the mixed team BC1-2 boccia event.

== Career ==
Fujii and her teammates Takayuki Hirose, Takayuki Kitani, and Hidetaka Sugimura helped secure Japan's first ever silver medal in Boccia at the 2016 Summer Paralympics. The following Paralympic Games, Fujii, Hirose, and Takumi Nakamura won a bronze medal in the mixed team BC1-2 boccia event. Fujii won another bronze medal the following year at the 2022 Boccia World Championships.
