= Jeong So-yeong =

South Korean boccia player

Personal information
- Native name: 정소영
- Born: 12 December 1988 (age 37) Cheonan, South Korea

Sport
- Country: South Korea
- Sport: Boccia
Medal record
Representing South Korea
Paralympic Games
Silver medal – second place	2024 Paris	Women's individual BC2
Asian Para Games
Gold medal – first place	2022 Hangzhou	Mixed team BC1/BC2
Silver medal – second place	2022 Hangzhou	Women's individual BC2

Jeong So-yeong (Korean: 정소영; born 12 December 1988) is a South Korean boccia player. She competed at the 2024 Summer Paralympics, reaching the finals of the women's individual BC2 event.
