= Muhamad Afrizal Syafa =

Indonesian boccia player

Personal information
- Born: 21 June 2003 (age 23) Surakarta, Indonesia

Sport
- Sport: Boccia
- Disability class: BC1
Medal record
Men's boccia
Representing Indonesia
Paralympic Games
Silver medal – second place	2024 Paris	Team BC1–2
Bronze medal – third place	2024 Paris	Individual BC1
World Cup
Gold medal – first place	2024 Montreal	Individual BC1
Gold medal – first place	2024 Montreal	Team BC1–2
Asian Para Games
Gold medal – first place	2026 Aichi–Nagoya	Team BC1–2
Bronze medal – third place	2022 Hangzhou	Individual BC1
ASEAN Para Games
Gold medal – first place	2023 Cambodia	Individual BC1
Bronze medal – third place	2022 Surakarta	Individual BC1

Muhamad Afrizal Syafa (born 21 June 2003) is an Indonesian boccia player. He represented Indonesia at the 2024 Summer Paralympics.

== Career ==
Syafa represented Indonesia at the 2024 Summer Paralympics and won a silver medal in the mixed team BC1–2 event, and a bronze medal in the individual BC1 event.
