= Takayuki Hirose =

Japanese Paralympic boccia player

Personal information
- Born: 31 August 1984 (age 41) Kimitsu, Japan

Sport
- Sport: Boccia
- Disability class: BC2
Medal record
Men's boccia
Representing Japan
Paralympic Games
Silver medal – second place	2016 Rio de Janeiro	Team BC1–2
Bronze medal – third place	2020 Tokyo	Team BC1–2
Bronze medal – third place	2024 Paris	Team BC1–2
Asian Para Games
Bronze medal – third place	2018 Jakarta	Team BC1–2

Takayuki Hirose (born 31 August 1984) is a Japanese boccia player.

== Career ==
Hirose represented Japan at the 2024 Summer Paralympics and won a bronze medal in the mixed team BC1–2 event.
