= Watcharaphon Vongsa =

Thai Paralympic boccia player

Personal information
- Born: 15 October 1990 (age 35) Loei Province, Thailand
- Height: 168 cm (5 ft 6 in)
- Weight: 45 kg (99 lb)

Sport
- Sport: Boccia
- Disability class: BC2
Medal record
Event	1st	2nd	3rd
Paralympic Games	4	1	1
Asian Para Games	3	2	1
Paralympic Games
Gold medal – first place	2012 London	Team BC1–2
Gold medal – first place	2016 Rio de Janeiro	Individual BC2
Gold medal – first place	2016 Rio de Janeiro	Team BC1–2
Gold medal – first place	2020 Tokyo	Team BC1–2
Silver medal – second place	2020 Tokyo	Individual BC2
Bronze medal – third place	2024 Paris	Individual BC2
Asian Para Games
Gold medal – first place	2010 Guangzhou	Individual BC2
Gold medal – first place	2014 Incheon	Team BC1–2
Gold medal – first place	2018 Jakarta	Team BC1–2
Silver medal – second place	2014 Incheon	Individual BC2
Silver medal – second place	2018 Jakarta	Individual BC2
Bronze medal – third place	2022 Hangzhou	Team BC1–2

Watcharaphon Vongsa (Thai: วัชรพล วงษา, born 15 October 1990) is a Thai boccia player who represented Thailand at the 2012, 2016, 2020 and 2024 Summer Paralympics, and won four Paralympic gold medals in total.
