= Maciel Santos =

Brazilian boccia player

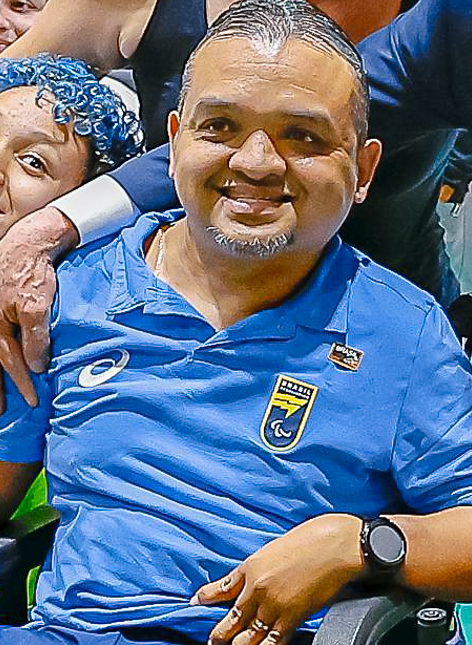
- Santos in May 2025

Personal information
- Full name: Maciel de Sousa Santos
- Born: 5 September 1985 (age 40) Crateús, Ceará, Brazil

Sport
- Sport: Boccia
- Disability class: BC2
Medal record
Boccia
Representing Brazil
Paralympic Games
Gold medal – first place	2012 London	Individual BC2
Bronze medal – third place	2020 Tokyo	Individual BC2

Maciel de Sousa Santos (Note: This name uses Portuguese naming customs: the first or maternal family name is Sousa and the second or paternal family name is Santos.) (born 5 September 1985) is a Brazilian boccia player.

Santos started playing boccia at the age of eleven and was already competing internationally at fourteen. He trains daily for six to eight hours. At the 2012 Summer Paralympics in London, he won the gold medal by defeating Yan Zhiqiang in the Individual BC2 event. At the 2020 Summer Paralympics in Tokyo, he won the bronze medal in the same event.

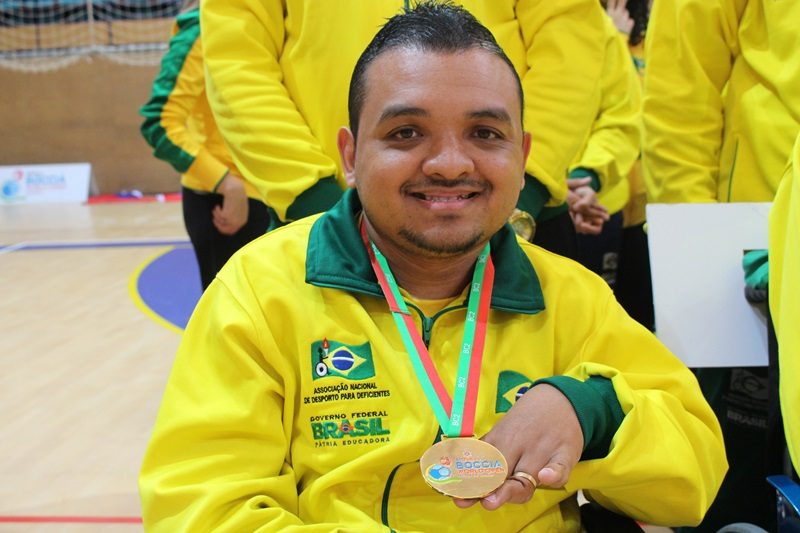
Santos in 2016
