= Claire Taggart =

UK Paralympic boccia player and stationer

Claire Taggart MBE
- Born: 11 February 1995 (age 31); Larne Northern Ireland
- Occupations: stationer and paralympic boccia player
- Known for: Boccia Paralympian

Claire Taggart MBE (born 11 February 1995) is a UK Paralympic Boccia player and stationer from Larne, Northern Ireland.

As of 2023 Claire is ranked 1st in the BC2 rankings, She is also a fan of local association football team Larne F.C. and regularly does speeches and interviews at Half Time of matches talking about her triumphs in Boccia

== Life ==
Taggart is from Larne in Northern Ireland. She was identified as a BC2 boccia player in 2014.

She was named with David Smith, Nigel Murray and Joshua Rowe as part of the UK's Boccia team. She was 21 when competed at the Rio Paralympics in 2016. No one from Northern Ireland had competed in a Paralympic boccia event before. She would later call her dog Rio.

Taggart runs her own stationery business.

She won a silver medal at the European Championships in Seville in 2019 where she was beaten by Francis Rombouts from Belgium. Taggart was in the three person team with Reegan Stevenson and David Smith that received gold medals. The three of them beat the team from Slovakia 4–3 in the final. During the COVID-19 pandemic she had to keep fit by training in her hallway for four months.

In January 2020 she was appointed as the accessibility officer at Larne F.C. initially in an advisory role.

In 2022, Taggert secured two gold medals at the Boccia World Cup in Portugal. and later the same year, gold in the Boccia World Championships in Rio. Taggart is supported by the Mary Peters Trust.

Taggart was awarded an MBE in the 2024 New Year Honours for services to Boccia.
