= Hidetaka Sugimura =

Japanese Paralympic boccia player

Personal information
- Born: March 1, 1982 (age 44) Itō, Shizuoka, Japan

Sport
- Sport: Boccia
- Disability class: BC2
Medal record
Paralympic Games
Gold medal – first place	2020 Tokyo	Individual BC2
Silver medal – second place	2016 Rio de Janeiro	Team BC1–2
Bronze medal – third place	2020 Tokyo	Mixed team BC1–2
Asian Para Games
Silver medal – second place	2018 Jakarta	Team BC1–2

Hidetaka Sugimura (杉村英孝, Sugimura Hidetaka; born March 1, 1982) is a Japanese boccia player. He has represented Japan since 2010 and in the Summer Paralympics since 2012.

== Career ==
Sugimura and his teammates Yuriko Fujii, Takayuki Hirose and Takayuki Kitani helped secure Japan's first ever silver medal in Boccia at the 2016 Summer Paralympics. During the 2020 Summer Paralympics, he won the gold medal in the individual BC1 event and a bronze medal at the mixed team event.
