= Yan Zhiqiang =

Chinese paralympic boccia player

Personal information
- Born: 22 October 1987 (age 38) Chongqing, China

Sport
- Country: China
- Sport: Boccia
Medal record
Representing China
Paralympic Games
Gold medal – first place	2024 Paris	Team BC1-2
Silver medal – second place	2012 London	Individual BC2
Silver medal – second place	2012 London	Team BC1–2
Silver medal – second place	2020 Tokyo	Team BC1-2
Bronze medal – third place	2016 Rio de Janeiro	Individual BC2
Asian Para Games
Silver medal – second place	2014 Incheon	Team BC1-2
Bronze medal – third place	2014 Incheon	Individual BC2

Yan Zhiqiang (born 22 October 1987) is a Chinese paralympic boccia player. He participated at the 2012 Summer Paralympics in the boccia competition, being awarded the silver medal in the individual BC2 event. Zhiqiang also participated in the team BC1–2 event, being awarded the silver medal with his teammates Weibo Yuan, Zhang Qi and Kai Zhong. He participated at the 2016 Summer Paralympics in the boccia competition, being awarded the bronze medal in the individual BC2 event. Zhiqiang also participated at the 2008 Summer Paralympics in the boccia competition, winning no medal.
