= Zhang Qi (boccia) =

Chinese boccia player

Personal information
- Born: 24 November 1990 (age 35) Beijing, China

Sport
- Sport: Boccia
- Disability class: BC1
Medal record
Boccia
Representing China
Paralympic Games
Silver medal – second place	2012 London	Team
Silver medal – second place	2020 Tokyo	Team
Boccia World Cup
Silver medal – second place	2011 Belfast	Individual
Asian Para Games
Gold medal – first place	2022 Hangzhou	Individual BC1

Zhang Qi (Chinese: 张琦; pinyin: Zhāng Qí; born 24 November 1990) is a Chinese boccia player competing in the BC1 classification.

== Career ==
Zhang finished 23rd at the 2007 World Cup Championships in Belfast. She finished ninth individually at the 2008 Summer Paralympics in Beijing. There, she also participated in the team competition, where she was the team's youngest participant. China finished in 4th place in the team competition, after losing 4–5 to Spain in the bronze medal match.

Zhang finished in 12th place in the 2010 Asian Para Games, where she was eliminated in the group stage with one win and two losses. In the 2011 World Cup in Belfast, she came in 2nd place individually, having lost 2–3 to Kwang Min Ji in the final. At the 2012 Summer Paralympics in London, she won a silver medal in the team event, China won silver after losing 10–5 against Thailand in the final. Individually, she came in 6th place. She lost 2–3 to João Paulo Fernandes in the fifth place match. She also participated in both individual and team competitions at the 2016 Summer Paralympics. She lost the individual match with 1 win and 2 losses in the pool stage. She advanced to the final tournament in team competitions, but lost to Japan in a tiebreaker in the quarterfinals.

At the 2020 Summer Paralympics, Zhang won another silver in the team event.
