= Boccia at the 2020 Summer Paralympics – Pairs BC4 =

Boccia – Mixed pairs BC4 at the XVI Paralympic Games
- Venue: Ariake Gymnastics Centre
- Date: 2–4 September 2021

Medalists
1st place, gold medalist(s)		Samuel Andrejčík; Michaela Balcová; Martin Streharsky	Slovakia
2nd place, silver medalist(s)		Leung Yuk Wing; Lau Wai Yan Vivian; Wong Kwan Hang	Hong Kong
3rd place, bronze medalist(s)		Sergey Safin; Ivan Frolov; Daria Adonina	RPC

The mixed pairs BC4 boccia event at the 2020 Summer Paralympics was contested between 2 and 4 September 2021 at the Ariake Gymnastics Centre. Since this event is a mixed event, both genders, male and female, competed in the event.

The competition started off with a pools stage, containing 2 pools with 5 teams each, and was followed by the semifinals where the winners moved to the finals to fight for gold and the losers went to the bronze medal match to fight for bronze.

== Rosters ==
Each team contains three athletes but only two will be used when play. All team has a male (M) and female (F) athlete.

- Brazil:
  - Eliseu dos Santos (M)
  - M. dos Santos (M)
  - Ercileide da Silva (F)
- Canada:
  - Alison Levine (F)
  - Iulian Ciobanu (M)
  - Marco Dispaltro (M)
- Colombia:
  - Euclides Grisales (M)
  - Duban Cely (M)
  - Leidy Chica (F)
- Great Britain:
  - Stephen McGuire (M)
  - Louis Saunders (M)
  - Evie Edwards (F)
- Hong Kong:
  - Leung Yuk Wing (M)
  - Lau Wai Yan Vivian (F)
  - Wong Kwan Hang (M)

- Japan:
  - Shun Esaki (M)
  - Wataru Furumitsu (M)
  - Juri Kimura (F)
- Portugal:
  - Pedro Carla (M)
  - Manuel Cruz (M)
  - Carla Oliveira (F)
- RPC:
  - Sergey Safin (M)
  - Ivan Frolov (M)
  - Daria Adonina (F)
- Slovakia:
  - Samuel Andrejčík (M)
  - Michaela Balcová (F)
  - Martin Streharsky (M)
- Thailand:
  - Pornchok Larpyen (M)
  - Ritthikrai Somsanuk (M)
  - Nuanchan Phonsila (F)

== Pools ==
The pools (or can be known as a group stage) were played between 2 and 3 September 2021. The top two teams in each pool qualified for the semi-finals.

=== Pool A ===
Pos	Team	Pld	W	L	PF	PA	PD	Qualification	SVK	POR	GBR	BRA	CAN
1	Slovakia	4	4	0	29	7	+22	Advance to semi-finals	—	10–1	8–0	7–3	4–3
2	Portugal	4	2	2	11	22	−11	Advance to semi-finals	—	—	—	3–2	—
3	Great Britain	4	2	2	12	17	−5		—	1–3	—	—	6–4
4	Brazil	4	1	3	13	19	−6		—	—	—	—	—
5	Canada	4	1	3	17	17	0		—	9–4	2–5	3–4	—

Source: olympics.com
Rules for classification: 1) Wins; 2) Head-to-head wins; 3) Points difference; 4) Points for; 5) Ends won; 6) Highest positive points difference in a single match; 7) Highest positive points difference in a single end; 8) Lowest seeding position;

Date	Time	Team 1	Score	Team 2
2 September	9:30	Slovakia	7–3	Brazil
2 September	9:30	Canada	9–4	Portugal
2 September	14:25	Slovakia	10–1	Portugal
2 September	14:25	Great Britain (United Kingdom)	6–4	Brazil
2 September	18:05	Slovakia	8–0	(United Kingdom) Great Britain
2 September	18:05	Canada	3–4	Brazil
3 September	11:15	Canada	2–5	(United Kingdom) Great Britain
3 September	11:15	Portugal	3–2	Brazil
3 September	16:10	Slovakia	4–3	Canada
3 September	16:10	Great Britain (United Kingdom)	1–3	Portugal

=== Pool B ===
Pos	Team	Pld	W	L	PF	PA	PD	Qualification	HKG	RPC	THA	JPN	COL
1	Hong Kong	4	4	0	26	6	+20	Advance to semi-finals	—	8–2	5–1	7–1	6–2
2	RPC	4	3	1	21	16	+5	Advance to semi-finals	—	—	—	7–3	7–3
3	Thailand	4	2	2	14	14	0		—	2–5	—	8–2	3–2
4	Japan	4	1	3	13	23	−10		—	—	—	—	—
5	Colombia	4	0	4	8	23	−15		—	—	—	1–7	—

Source: olympics.com
Rules for classification: 1) Wins; 2) Head-to-head wins; 3) Points difference; 4) Points for; 5) Ends won; 6) Highest positive points difference in a single match; 7) Highest positive points difference in a single end; 8) Lowest seeding position;

Date	Time	Team 1	Score	Team 2
2 September	11:25	Hong Kong	7–1	Japan
2 September	11:25	Thailand	3–2	Colombia
2 September	16:20	Hong Kong	6–2	Colombia
2 September	16:20	RPC (Russia)	7–3	Japan
3 September	9:30	Thailand	8–2	Japan
3 September	9:30	Hong Kong	8–2	(Russia) RPC
3 September	14:25	Thailand	2–5	(Russia) RPC
3 September	14:25	Colombia	1–7	Japan
3 September	18:05	Hong Kong	5–1	Thailand
3 September	18:05	RPC (Russia)	7–3'	Colombia

== Knockout stage ==
The knockout stage was played on 4 September.

Semi-finals
Slovakia	5
RPC	2
Hong Kong	4
Portugal	2

Finals
Slovakia	3
Hong Kong	2
Third place match
RPC	5
Portugal	1
