= Boccia at the 2020 Summer Paralympics – Mixed individual BC4 =

Boccia at the XVI Paralympic Games
- Venue: Ariake Gymnastics Centre
- Dates: 28 August - 4 September
- Competitors: 24 from 13 nations

Medalists
1st place, gold medalist(s)		Samuel Andrejčík	Slovakia
2nd place, silver medalist(s)		Pornchok Larpyen	Thailand
3rd place, bronze medalist(s)		Leung Yuk Wing	Hong Kong

The mixed individual BC4 boccia event at the 2020 Summer Paralympics took place between 28 August to 4 September at the Ariake Gymnastics Centre in Tokyo. 24 competitors took part.

== Final stage ==
The knockout stage was played between 30 August to 1 September.

Quarter-finals
Wai Yan Vivian Lau (HKG)	1
Samuel Andrejčík (SVK)	4
Zheng Yuansen (CHN)	3*
Eliseu dos Santos (BRA)	3
Michaela Balcová (SVK)	0
Leung Yuk Wing (HKG)	8
Euclides Grisales (COL)	3
Pornchok Larpyen (THA)	6

Semi-finals
Samuel Andrejčík (SVK)	5
Zheng Yuansen (CHN)	2
Leung Yuk Wing (HKG)	3
Pornchok Larpyen (THA)	6

Finals
Samuel Andrejčík (SVK)	4
Pornchok Larpyen (THA)	0
Third place match
Zheng Yuansen (CHN)	4
Leung Yuk Wing (HKG)	5

== Pool stages ==
=== Pool A ===
Boccia at the 2020 Summer Paralympics - Individual BC4 Pool A
Pos	Player	Pld	W	L	PF	PA	PD	H2H	Player	(Hong Kong)	(Croatia)	(Canada)	(Slovakia)
1 Q	W.Y.V. Lau (HKG)	3	3	0	15	6	+9	H2H	(Hong Kong)		4-3	3-2	8-1
2	Davor Komar (CRO)	3	2	1	16	8	+8	H2H	(Croatia)	3-4		8-2	5-2
3	Alison Levine (CAN)	3	1	2	8	14	-6	H2H	(Canada)	2-3	2-8		4-3
4	M. Strehársky (SVK)	3	0	3	6	17	-11	H2H	(Slovakia)	1-8	2-5	3-4	

=== Pool B ===
Boccia at the 2020 Summer Paralympics - Individual BC4 Pool B
Pos	Player	Pld	W	L	PF	PA	PD	H2H	Player	(Slovakia)	(Germany)	(Colombia)	(Colombia)
1 Q	M. Balcová (SVK)	3	3	0	23	7	+16	H2H	(Slovakia)		6-1	10-2	7-4
2	Boris Nicolai (GER)	3	2	1	11	12	-1	H2H	(Germany)	1-6		3-5	7-1
3	Duban Cely (COL)	3	1	2	9	15	−6	H2H	(Colombia)	2-10	5-3		2-2*
4	Leidy Chica (COL)	3	1	2	7	16	-9	H2H	(Colombia)	4-7	1-7	2*-2	

=== Pool C ===
Boccia at the 2020 Summer Paralympics - Individual BC4 Pool C
Pos	Player	Pld	W	L	PF	PA	PD	H2H	Player	(Colombia)	(Hong Kong)	(United Kingdom)	(Japan)
1 Q	Euclides Grisales (COL)	3	3	0	17	5	+12	H2H	(Colombia)		7-3	6-0	4-2
2	K.H. Wong (HKG)	3	2	1	12	11	+1	H2H	(Hong Kong)	3-7		4-1	5-3
3	S. McGuire (GBR)	3	1	2	4	12	-8	H2H	(United Kingdom)	0-6	1-4		3-2
4	Shun Esaki (JPN)	3	0	3	7	12	−5	H2H	(Japan)	2-4	3-5	2-3	

=== Pool D ===
Boccia at the 2020 Summer Paralympics - Individual BC4 Pool D
Pos	Player	Pld	W	L	PF	PA	PD	H2H	Player	(China)	(Canada)	(China)	(Portugal)
1 Q	Zheng Yuansen (CHN)	3	3	0	23	9	+14	H2H	(China)		8-2	5*-5	10-2
2	Iulian Ciobanu (CAN)	3	2	1	11	15	-4	H2H	(Canada)	2-8		6-4	3*-3
3	Ximei Lin (CHN)	3	1	2	15	13	+2	H2H	(China)	5-5*	4-6		6-2
4	Carla Oliveira (POR)	3	0	3	7	19	−12	H2H	(Portugal)	2-10	3-3*	2-6	

=== Pool E ===
Boccia at the 2020 Summer Paralympics - Individual BC4 Pool E
Pos	Player	Pld	W	L	PF	PA	PD	H2H	Player	(Brazil)	(Hong Kong)	RPC	(Brazil)
1 Q	E. dos Santos (BRA)	3	3	0	16	10	+6	H2H	(Brazil)		6-4	7-3	3*-3
2 Q	Leung Yuk Wing (HKG)	3	2	1	21	7	+14	H2H	(Hong Kong)	4-6		3-1	14-0
3	Sergey Safin (RPC)	3	1	2	15	17	-2	H2H	RPC	3-7	1-3		11-7
4	M. dos Santos (BRA)	3	0	3	10	28	−18	H2H	(Brazil)	3-3*	0-14	7-11	

=== Pool F ===
Boccia at the 2020 Summer Paralympics - Individual BC4 Pool F
Pos	Player	Pld	W	L	PF	PA	PD	H2H	Player	(Thailand)	(Slovakia)	(Thailand)	(United Kingdom)
1 Q	P. Larpyen (THA)	3	3	0	15	3	+12	H2H	(Thailand)		4-1	4-1	7-1
2 Q	Samuel Andrejčík (SVK)	3	2	1	16	7	+9	H2H	(Slovakia)	1-4		8-0	7-3
3	R. Somsanuk (THA)	3	1	2	15	17	−2	H2H	(Thailand)	1-4	0-8		9-0
4	Louis Saunders (GBR)	3	0	3	4	23	-19	H2H	(United Kingdom)	1-7	3-7	0-9	
