= Hong Kong at the 2020 Summer Paralympics =

- IPC code: HKG
- NPC: Hong Kong Paralympic Committee and Sports Association for the Physically Disabled
- Website: www.hkparalympic.org

in Tokyo
- Competitors: 24 in 8 sports
- Flag bearers (opening): Yam Kwok Fan and Hui Ka Chun
- Flag bearer (closing): Chu Man Kai
- Medals: Gold 0 Silver 2 Bronze 3 Total 5

Summer Paralympics appearances (overview)
- 1972; 1976; 1980; 1984; 1988; 1992; 1996; 2000; 2004; 2008; 2012; 2016; 2020; 2024

Hong Kong competed at the 2020 Summer Paralympics in Tokyo, Japan, from 24 August to 5 September 2021. These were the last games contested by Hong Kong under the Hong Kong Paralympic Committee and Sports Association for the Physically Disabled umbrella, before the organisation separated into two independent entities namely the Hong Kong Paralympic Committee and Hong Kong Sports Association for the Physically Disabled on 1 April 2022.

== Medalists ==
Medal	Name	Sport	Event	Date
Silver	Leung Yuk Wing; Lau Wai Yan Vivian; Wong Kwan Hang	Boccia	Mixed pairs BC4	4 September
Silver	Chu Man Kai	Badminton	Men's singles SH6	5 September
Bronze	Wong Ting Ting	Table tennis	Women's individual C11	28 August
Bronze	Leung Yuk Wing	Boccia	Mixed individual BC4	1 September
Bronze	Chan Ho Yuen	Badminton	Men's singles WH2	5 September

== Competitors ==
The following is the list of number of competitors participating in the Games:

Sport	Men	Women	Total
Archery	1	0	1
Athletics	1	1	2
Badminton	2	0	2
Boccia	3	4	7
Equestrian	1	2	3
Swimming	2	2	4
Table Tennis	0	2	2
Wheelchair fencing	0	3	3
Total	10	14	24

== Archery ==
Hong Kong has entered one archer at Men's Individual Compound Open.

Athlete	Event	Ranking round		Round of 32	Round of 16	Quarterfinals	Semifinals	Finals	
Athlete	Event	Score	Seed	Opposition score	Opposition score	Opposition score	Opposition score	Opposition score	Rank
Ngai Ka Chuen	Men's individual compound	667	30	Sulaiman Sulaiman (IRQ); W 140–138	Rakesh Kumar (IND); L 131–144	Did not advance			

== Athletics ==
Two Hong Kong athletes has successfully entered the paralympic slot in athletics.

Track events
Women

Athlete	Events	Heat		Final	
Athlete	Events	Time	Rank	Time	Rank
Yam Kwok Fan	100 metres T36	16.15	10	Did not advance	
Yam Kwok Fan	200 metres T36	34.79	10	Did not advance	

Field events
Men

Athlete	Events	Result	Rank
Nikki Tang	Long jump T20	5.74	11

== Badminton ==
Hong Kong has qualified a total of two para-badminton players for each of the following events into the Paralympic tournament based on the Para Badminton World Rankings.

Men

Athlete	Event	Group stage			Quarterfinal	Semifinal	Final / BM	
Athlete	Event	Opposition Score	Opposition Score	Rank	Opposition Score	Opposition Score	Opposition Score	Rank
Chan Ho Yuen	Singles WH2	Jakobs (FRA); W (21–10, 21–8)	Kajiwara (JPN); L (21–13, 12–21, 13–21)	2 Q	Rooke (GBR); W (21–9, 21–11)	Kim J-j (KOR); L (21–15, 15–21, 15–21)	Kim K-h (KOR); W (24–22, 21–10)	3rd place, bronze medalist(s)
Chu Man Kai	Singles SH6	Coombs (GBR); W (21–15, 21–10)	Shephard (GBR); L (11–21, 24–22, 10–21)	1 Q	—N/a	Tavares (BRA); W (15–21, 21–18, 21–10)	Nagar (IND); L (17–21, 21–16, 17–21)	2nd place, silver medalist(s)

== Boccia ==
Six Hong Kong athletes get a ticket in Individual BC3, BC4 & Individual BC2 events.

Individual

Athletes	Events	Pool matches				Quarterfinals	Semifinals	Final / BM	
Athletes	Events	Opposition Score	Opposition Score	Opposition Score	Rank	Opposition Score	Opposition Score	Opposition Score	Rank
Yeung Hiu Lam	Mixed BC2	Kurilák (SVK); W 7−1	Hirose (JPN); W 6−1	Valente (POR); W 4−3	1 Q	Santos (BRA); L 5−6	Did not advance		5
Ho Yuen Kei	Mixed BC3	Kim (KOR); L 2−4	Soares da Silva Calado (BRA); W 8−1	Macedo (POR); W 3−1	2	Did not advance			9
Tse Tak Wah	Mixed BC3	Jeong (KOR); L 1−8	Carvalho (BRA); W 3*−3	Kawamoto (JPN); W 3−2	2	Did not advance			12
Lau Wai Yan Vivian	Mixed BC4	Komar (CRO); W 4−3	Levine (CAN); W 3−2	Strehársky (SVK); W 8−1	1 Q	Andrejčík (SVK); L 1−4	Did not advance		7
Leung Yuk Wing	Mixed BC4	Safin (RPC); W 3−1	M dos Santos (BRA); W 14−0	E dos Santos (BRA); L 4−6	2 Q	Balcová (SVK); W 8−0	Larpyen (THA); L 3−6	Zheng (CHN); W 5−4	3rd place, bronze medalist(s)
Wong Kwan Hang	Mixed BC4	McGuire (GBR); W 4−1	Grisales (COL); L 3−7	Esaki (JPN); W 5−3	2	Did not advance			10

Pairs

Athletes	Events	Pool matches					Semifinals	Final / BM	
Athletes	Events	Opposition Score	Opposition Score	Opposition Score	Opposition Score	Rank	Opposition Score	Opposition Score	Rank
Ho Yuen Kei; Liu Wing Tung; Tse Tak Wah	Mixed BC3	Portugal; W 4–1	Japan; W 4*–4	Brazil; L 3–5	Australia; W 3*–3	1 Q	South Korea; L 2–5	Greece; L 0–7	4
Lau Wai Yan Vivian; Leung Yuk Wing; Wong Kwan Hang	Mixed BC4	Japan; W 7–1	Colombia; W 6–2	RPC; W 8–2	Thailand; W 5–1	1 Q	Portugal; W 4–2	Slovakia; L 2–3	2nd place, silver medalist(s)

== Equestrian ==
Hong Kong sent two athlete after qualified.

Individual

Athlete	Horse	Event	Total	
Athlete	Horse	Event	Score	Rank
Tse Pui Ting Natasha	Baxo	Individual championship test grade I	63.786	16
Tse Pui Ting Natasha	Baxo	Individual freestyle test grade I	Did not advance	
Fleur Schrader	Caraat	Individual championship test grade III	67.706	14
Fleur Schrader	Caraat	Individual freestyle test grade III	Did not advance	
Tsang Tin Chi Timothy	Cethegus M	Individual championship test grade III	Did not start	
Tsang Tin Chi Timothy	Cethegus M	Individual freestyle test grade III	Did not advance	

== Swimming ==
Four Hong Kong swimmer has successfully entered the paralympic slot after breaking the MQS.

Men's events

Athlete	Events	Heats		Final	
Athlete	Events	Time	Rank	Time	Rank
Hui Ka Chun	100 m backstroke S14	1:02.74	11	Did not advance	
Tang Wai Lok	100 m butterfly S14	1:02.53	18	Did not advance	
Tang Wai Lok	200 m freestyle S14	1:59.77	10	Did not advance	
Tang Wai Lok	200 m individual medley SM14	2:18.87	14	Did not advance	

Women's events

Athlete	Events	Heats		Final	
Athlete	Events	Time	Rank	Time	Rank
Chan Yui-lam	100 m backstroke S14	1:12.57	6 Q	1:12.49	6
Chan Yui-lam	100 m breaststroke SB14	1:25.02	11	Did not advance	
Chan Yui-lam	100 m butterfly S14	1:07.20	3 Q	1:06.65	4
Chan Yui-lam	200 m freestyle S14	2:20.37	9	Did not advance	
Chan Yui-lam	200 m individual medley SM14	2:37.70	10	Did not advance	
Cheung Ho Ching	100 m butterfly S14	1:10.68	8 Q	1:11.29	8
Cheung Ho Ching	200 m individual medley SM14	2:38.46	11	Did not advance	

== Table tennis ==
Hong Kong entered two athletes into the table tennis competition at the games. Ng Mui Wui qualified from 2019 ITTF Asian Para Championships which was held in Taichung, Taiwan and Wong Ting Ting qualified via World Ranking allocation.

Women

Athlete	Event	Group stage				Round 1	Quarterfinals	Semifinals	Final	
Athlete	Event	Opposition Result	Opposition Result	Opposition Result	Rank	Opposition Result	Opposition Result	Opposition Result	Opposition Result	Rank
Ng Mui Wui	Individual C11	Maki Ito (JPN); W 3–1	Elena Prokofeva (RPC); L 0–3	Krystyna Lysiak (POL); L 2–3	3	—N/a		Did not advance		
Wong Ting Ting	Individual C11	Léa Ferney (FRA); W 3–1	Natalya Kosmina (UKR); W 3–1	Kanami Furukawa (JPN); L 1–3	2 Q	—N/a		Elena Prokofeva (RPC); L 1–3	Did not advance	3rd place, bronze medalist(s)

== Wheelchair fencing ==
Women

Athlete	Event	Pool round		Round of 16	Quarterfinal	Semifinal	Final / BM	
Athlete	Event	Result	Rank	Opposition Score	Opposition Score	Opposition Score	Opposition Score	Rank
Ng Justine Charissa	Épée A	2–2	9	Krajnyak (HUN); L 12–15	Did not advance			
Yu Chui Yee	Épée A	3–1	6	Mandryk (UKR); W 15–10	Rong (CHN); L 11–15	Did not advance		
Chung Yuen Ping	Épée B	1–5	13	Did not advance				
Ng Justine Charissa; Yu Chui Yee; Chung Yuen Ping	Team épée	Poland W 45–40; RPC L 22–45	2 Q	—N/a		Ukraine; L 27–45	RPC; L 34–45	4
Ng Justine Charissa	Foil A	1–3	11	Hajmasi (HUN) L 10–15	Did not advance			
Yu Chui Yee	Foil A	4–1	6	—N/a	Rong (CHN); L 10–15	Did not advance		
Chung Yuen Ping	Foil B	1–5	13	Did not advance				
Ng Justine Charissa; Yu Chui Yee; Chung Yuen Ping	Team foil	Ukraine W 45–34; United States W 45–14; Italy L 32–45	2 Q	—N/a		China; L 33–45	Hungary; L 44–45	4

== See also ==
- Hong Kong at the Paralympics
- Hong Kong at the 2020 Summer Olympics
