= Boccia at the 2020 Summer Paralympics – Qualification =

Qualification for boccia at the 2020 Summer Paralympics begin from 1 January 2018 to 31 December 2019. There are seven mixed events where 82 quotas are gender free and 34 are for females to make a total of 116 athletes.

== Timeline ==
The following is a timeline of the qualification events for the boccia events at the 2020 Summer Paralympics.

Event	Date	Venue	Berths
Pairs and team (NPC allocation)
2019 BISFed Boccia Asia/Oceania Championships	2–9 July 2019	(South Korea) Seoul	10 athletes
2019 BISFed Boccia European Championships	25 August–1 September 2019	(Spain) Sevilla	10 athletes
2019 BISFed Boccia Africa/Americas Championships	29 September–6 October 2019	(Brazil) São Paulo	10 athletes
2019 BISFed Pairs and Teams World Ranking	1 January 2018 – 31 December 2019	—	60 athletes
Host nation (subject to BISFed World Ranking)	1 January 2018 – 31 December 2019	—	10 athletes
Individual (NPC allocation)
2019 BISFed Boccia Asia/Oceania Championships	2–9 July 2019	(South Korea) Seoul	4 athletes
2019 BISFed Boccia European Championships	25 August–1 September 2019	(Spain) Sevilla	4 athletes
2019 BISFed Boccia Africa/Americas Championships	29 September–6 October 2019	(Brazil) São Paulo	4 athletes
Pairs and team athletes	—	—	40 athletes
Individual (athlete allocation)
2019 BISFed Individual World Ranking	1 January 2018 – 31 December 2019	—	40 athletes

== Quotas ==
The qualification slots are allocated to the NPC not to the individual athlete or team. Individual World Ranking List slots are allocated to the individual athlete not to the NPC.

- An NPC can allocated one pair or team in a BC1/BC2 team, BC3 or BC4 pairs events.
- An NPC can qualify a maximum of two athletes per individual medal event.
- In each pair or team event, an NPC must have at least one female athlete in their pair or team.

== Entry systems ==
=== Individuals ===
	BC1	BC2	BC3	BC4
2019 Regional; Championships	3	3	3	3
Individual World Ranking (No team/pair)*'	3	3	3	3
Individual World Ranking (In team/pair)*	3	7	7	7
Individual Female World Ranking (No team/pair)	1	1	1	1
From teams/pairs	10	10	10	10
Total	20	24	24	24

* up to the maximum entry per NPC.

=== Pairs and teams ===
	BC1/2 Team	BC3 Pairs	BC4 Pairs
Athlete numbers	40 (4 per NPC)	30 (3 per NPC)	30 (3 per NPC)
Host country	1	1	1
Direct qualification Top rank in Regionals	3	3	3
Ranking qualification	6	6	6
Total	10	10	10

== Qualification summary ==
As of December 2019.

=== Pairs and team ===
Event	Pair		Team
Event	BC3	BC4	BC1/BC2
Host nation	Japan	Japan	Japan
European Championship	France	Slovakia	RPC
Asian/Oceanian Championship	Hong Kong	Hong Kong	Thailand
American/African Championship	Brazil	Brazil	Brazil
Pairs/Team World Ranking	Greece	Thailand	China
Pairs/Team World Ranking	Australia	Canada	South Korea
Pairs/Team World Ranking	South Korea	Great Britain	Portugal
Pairs/Team World Ranking	Great Britain	RPC	Great Britain
Pairs/Team World Ranking	Thailand	Colombia	Argentina
Pairs/Team World Ranking	Portugal	Portugal	Slovakia

=== Individual ===
Event	BC1	BC2	BC3	BC4
European Championship	Great Britain	Portugal	Greece	Slovakia
Asian/Oceanian Championship	South Korea	Thailand	Hong Kong	Hong Kong
American/African Championship	Mexico^{1}	Brazil	Argentina^{2}	Brazil
Individual from Pairs/Team	Argentina	Argentina	Australia	Brazil
Individual from Pairs/Team	Brazil	Brazil	Brazil	Canada
Individual from Pairs/Team	China	China	France	Colombia
Individual from Pairs/Team	Great Britain	Great Britain	Great Britain	Great Britain
Individual from Pairs/Team	Japan	Japan	Greece	Hong Kong
Individual from Pairs/Team	Portugal	Portugal	Hong Kong	Japan
Individual from Pairs/Team	RPC	RPC	Japan	Portugal
Individual from Pairs/Team	Slovakia	Slovakia	Portugal	RPC
Individual from Pairs/Team	South Korea	South Korea	South Korea	Slovakia
Individual from Pairs/Team	Thailand	Thailand	Thailand	Thailand
Female World Ranking (No Team/Pair)	Katerina Curinova (CZE)	Hiu Lam Yeung (HKG)	Maria Bjurström (SWE)	Ximei Lin (CHN)
World Ranking (No Team/Pair)	Daniel Perez (NED)	Nadav Levi (ISR)	Aleksander Legostaev (RUS)	Boris Nicolai (GER)
World Ranking (No Team/Pair)	Wei Lun Chew (MAS)	Francis Rombouts (BEL)	Adam Peska (CZE)	Zheng Yuansen (CHN)
World Ranking (No Team/Pair)		Danik Allard (CAN)		Davor Komar (CRO)
World Ranking (From Team/Pair)	David Smith (GBR)	Worawut Saengampa (THA)	Grigorios Polychronidis (GRE)	Alison Levine (CAN)
World Ranking (From Team/Pair)	Witsanu Huadpradit (THA)	Hidetaka Sugimura (JPN)	Yuen Kei Ho (HKG)	Euclides Grisales (COL)
World Ranking (From Team/Pair)	Tomas Kral (SVK)	Maciel Santos (BRA)	Howon Jeong (KOR)	Yuk Wing Leung (HKG)
World Ranking (From Team/Pair)	José Carlos Oliveira (BRA)	Zhiqiang Yan (CHN)	Daniel Michel (AUS)	Samuel Andrejcik (SVK)
World Ranking (From Team/Pair)		Abílio Valente (POR)	Jamie McCowan (GBR)	Pornchok Larpyen (THA)
World Ranking (From Team/Pair)		Dmitry Kozmin (RUS)	Junyup Kim (KOR)	Eliseu dos Santos (BRA)
World Ranking (From Team/Pair)		Claire Taggart (GBR)	Evelyn de Oliveira (BRA)	Stephen McGuire (GBR)
World Ranking (From Team/Pair)			Mateus Carvalho (BRA)	

Note
^{1} Mexico did not qualify for the BC1/BC2 team event, so Eduardo Sanchez Reyes represents as Mexico for NPC allocation and BISFed World Ranking for NPC that did not qualify for pairs and team events will be reduced by one.
^{2} Argentina did not qualify for the BC3 pairs event, so Stefania Ferrando represents as Argentina for NPC allocation and BISFed World Ranking for NPC that did not qualify for pairs and team events will be reduced by one.
