= Boccia at the 2016 Summer Paralympics – Individual BC4 =

Boccia – Individual BC4 at the XV Paralympic Games
- Venue: Sambodromo
- Dates: 13 September 2016 – 16 September 2016
- Competitors: 16

Medalists
1st place, gold medalist(s)		Leung Yuk Wing	Hong Kong
2nd place, silver medalist(s)		Samuel Andrejcik	Slovakia
3rd place, bronze medalist(s)		Pornchok Larpyen	Thailand

The mixed individual BC4 boccia event at the 2016 Summer Paralympics was contested from 13 September to 16 September at Sambodromo in Rio de Janeiro. 16 competitors took part.

The event structure was amended from the 2012 event, with pool stages added. The top two players from each of four round robin pools of four entered into a quarterfinal single-elimination stage, with the losing semifinalists playing off for bronze.

== Elimination rounds ==
Quarter finals
1	Stephen McGuire (GBR)	2
8	Leung Yuk Wing (HKG)	4
4	Pornchok Larpyen (THA)	3
5	Alison Levine (CAN)	2
2	Seo Hyeonseok (KOR)	5
7	Pedro Clara (POR)	2
3	Zheng Yuansen (CHN)	0
6	Samuel Andrejcik (SVK)	5

Semi finals
Leung Yuk Wing (HKG)	7
Pornchok Larpyen (THA)	4
Seo Hyeonseok (KOR)	0
Samuel Andrejcik (SVK)	6

Gold medal match
Leung Yuk Wing (HKG)	4
Samuel Andrejcik (SVK)	3
Bronze medal match
Pornchok Larpyen (THA)	8
Seo Hyeonseok (KOR)	1

== Pool stages ==
=== Pool A ===
Boccia at the 2016 Summer Paralympics - Individual BC4 Pool A
Pos	Player	Pld	W	D	L	PF	PA	PD	Pts	H2H	Player	(South Korea)	(Hong Kong)	(Portugal)	(Greece)
1 Q	Seo Hyeonseok (KOR)	3	3	0	0	21	8	+13	9	H2H	(South Korea)		6-4	5-3	10-1
2 Q	Leung Yuk Wing (HKG)	3	2	0	1	22	11	+11	7	H2H	(Hong Kong)	4-6		5-3	13-2
3	Domingos Vieira (POR)	3	1	0	2	12	11	+1	5	H2H	(Portugal)	3-5	3-5		6-1
4	Chrysi MetZou-Morfi (GRE)	3	0	0	3	4	31	-27	3	H2H	(Greece)	1-10	2-15	1-6	

=== Pool B ===
Boccia at the 2016 Summer Paralympics - Individual BC4 Pool B
Pos	Player	Pld	W	D	L	PF	PA	PD	Pts	H2H	Player	(United Kingdom)	(Portugal)	(Hong Kong)	(Brazil)
1 Q	Stephen McGuire (GBR)	3	2	0	1	11	13	-2	7	H2H	(United Kingdom)		4-3	5-4	2-6
2 Q	Pedro Clara (POR)	3	2	0	1	14	12	+2	7	H2H	(Portugal)	3-4		5-3	6-5
3	Lau Wai Yan (HKG)	3	1	0	2	16	12	+4	5	H2H	(Hong Kong)	4-5	3-5		9-2
4	Dirceu Pinto (BRA)	3	1	0	2	13	17	-4	5	H2H	(Brazil)	6-2	5-6	2-9	

=== Pool C ===
Boccia at the 2016 Summer Paralympics - Individual BC4 Pool C
Pos	Player	Pld	W	D	L	PF	PA	PD	Pts	H2H	Player	(Thailand)	(Slovakia)	(Brazil)	(United Kingdom)
1 Q	Pornchok Larpyen (THA)	3	3	0	0	13	3	+10	9	H2H	(Thailand)		3-1	5-2	5-0
2 Q	Samuel Andrejcik (SVK)	3	2	0	1	17	7	+10	7	H2H	(Slovakia)	1-3		7-1	9-3
3	Eliseu dos Santos (BRA)	3	1	0	2	13	12	+1	5	H2H	(Brazil)	2-5	1-7		10-0
4	Kieran Steer (GBR)	3	0	0	3	3	24	-21	3	H2H	(United Kingdom)	0-5	3-9	0-10	

=== Pool D ===
Boccia at the 2016 Summer Paralympics - Individual BC4 Pool D
Pos	Player	Pld	W	D	L	PF	PA	PD	Pts	H2H *	Player	(China) Zheng	(Canada) Levine	(China) Lin	(Canada) D'tro
1 Q	Zheng Yuanseng (CHN)	3	3	0	0	18	5	+13	9	H2H *	(China) - Z		5-2	4-3	9-0
2 Q	Alison Levine (CAN)	3	1	0	2	10	11	-1	5	H2H *	(Canada) - L	2-5		6-1	2-5
3	Lin Ximei (CHN)	3	1	0	2	10	11	-1	5	H2H *	(China) - L	3-4	1-6		6-1
4	Marco Dispaltro (CAN)	3	1	0	2	6	17	-11	5	H2H *	(Canada) - D	0-9	5-2	1-6	

* Note : As this pool featured two athletes per nation, names/initials are given in the 'Head to head' section to avoid ambiguity
