= Slovakia at the 2020 Summer Paralympics =

- IPC code: SVK
- NPC: Slovak Paralympic Committee
- Website: www.spv.sk

in Tokyo
- Competitors: 27 in 8 sports
- Flag bearers: Veronika Vadovičová; Samuel Andrejčík
- Medals: Gold 5 Silver 2 Bronze 4 Total 11

Summer Paralympics appearances (overview)
- 1996; 2000; 2004; 2008; 2012; 2016; 2020; 2024

Other related appearances
- Czechoslovakia (1972–1992)

Slovakia competed at the 2020 Summer Paralympics in Tokyo, Japan, from 24 August to 5 September 2021.

== Medalists ==
Medal	Name	Sport	Event	Date
Gold	Jozef Metelka	Cycling	Men's individual pursuit C4	27 August
Gold	Patrik Kuril	Cycling	Men's road time trial C4	31 August
Gold	Samuel Andrejčík	Boccia	Mixed individual BC4	1 September
Gold	Samuel Andrejčík; Michaela Balcová; Martin Strehársky	Boccia	Mixed pairs BC4	4 September
Gold	Veronika Vadovičová	Shooting	Mixed R6 50 metre rifle prone SH1	5 September
Silver	Alena Kánová	Table Tennis	Women's individual C3	29 August
Silver	Jozef Metelka	Cycling	Men's road time trial C4	31 August
Bronze	Jozef Metelka	Cycling	Men's 1000 m time trial C4-5	26 August
Bronze	Boris Trávníček; Peter Mihálik	Table Tennis	Men's team – Class 4–5	1 September
Bronze	Martin Ludrovský; Ján Riapoš	Table tennis	Men's team – Class 1–2	1 September
Bronze	Marián Kuřeja	Athletics	Men's club throw F51	1 September

Medals by sport
Sport	1	2	3	Total
Athletics	0	0	1	1
Boccia	2	0	0	2
Cycling	2	1	1	4
Shooting	1	0	0	1
Table tennis	0	1	2	3
Total	5	2	4	11

== Competitors ==
The following is the list of number of competitors in the Games.

Sport	Men	Women	Total
Archery	3	0	3
Athletics	3	0	3
Boccia	5	2	7
Cycling	3	1	4
Shooting	1	2	3
Swimming	0	1	1
Table tennis	4	1	5
Wheelchair tennis	1	0	1
Total	20	7	27

== Archery ==
Slovakia has entered two archer at Men's Individual Compound Open, and one archer in Men's Individual recurve.

=== Men ===
Athlete	Event	Ranking round		Round of 32	Round of 16	Quarterfinals	Semifinals	Finals	
Athlete	Event	Score	Seed	Opposition score	Opposition score	Opposition score	Opposition score	Opposition score	Rank
Dávid Ivan	Men's individual recurve	609	14	Wang (CHN); W 6-2	Smirnov (ROC); L 0-4	did not advance			
Marián Marečák	Men's individual compound	686	14	Stubbs (GBR); W 138-138	Kumar (IND); L 137-140	did not advance			
Marcel Pavlík	Men's individual compound	696	5	Cancelli (ITA); W 142-139	Stutzman (USA); W 143-137	Forsberg (FIN); W 144-141	He (CHN); L 146-148	Ai (CHN); L 142-144	4

== Athletics ==
Two Slovak athletes (Marián Kuřeja & Adrián Matušík) successfully to break through the qualifications for the 2020 Paralympics after breaking the qualification limit.

=== Men's field ===
Athlete	Events	Mark (m)	Rank
Dušan Laczkó	Discus throw F56	41.37	5
Ladislav Čuchran	Javelin throw F54	29.03	5
Marián Kuřeja	Club throw F51	30.66	3rd place, bronze medalist(s)

== Boccia ==
Four athletes get a ticket for Slovakia in BC1/BC2 & BC4 events. The team is composed of Samuel Andrejčík, Michaela Balcová, Tomáš Kráľ, Kristína Kudláčová, Rastislav Kurilák, Róbert Mezík and Martin Strehársky.

Individual

Athlete	Event	Pool matches				Quarterfinals	Semifinals	Final / BM	
Athlete	Event	Opposition Score	Opposition Score	Opposition Score	Rank	Opposition Score	Opposition Score	Opposition Score	Rank
Tomáš Kráľ	Individual BC1	Fujii (JPN); W 5-2	Ramos (POR); L 0-11	de Oliveira (BRA); L 2-4	3	did not advance			
Rastislav Kurilák	Individual BC2	Yeung (HKG); L 1-7	Valente (POR); W 7-2	Hirose (JPN); L 3-4	3	did not advance			
Róbert Mezík	Individual BC2	Rombouts (BEL); W 10-1	Hipwell (GBR); W 6-3	Saengampa (THA); L 4-10	2 Q	Sugimura (JPN); L 8-1	did not advance		
Martin Strehársky	Individual BC4	Levine (CAN); L 3-4	Komar (CRO); L 2-5	Lau (HKG); L 1-8	4	did not advance			
Samuel Andrejčík	Individual BC4	Saunders (GBR); W 7-3	Somsanuk (THA); W 8-0	Larpyen (THA); L 1-4	2 Q	Lau (HKG); W 4-1	Yuansen (CHN); W 5-2	Larpyen (THA); W 4-0	1st place, gold medalist(s)
Michaela Balcová	Individual BC4	Nicolai (GER); W 6-1	Cely (COL); W 10-2	Chica (COL); W 7-4	1 Q	Leung (HKG); L 0-8	did not advance		

Pairs and teams

Athlete	Event	Pool matches					Quarterfinals	Semifinals	Final / BM	
Athlete	Event	Opposition Score	Opposition Score	Opposition Score	Opposition Score	Rank	Opposition Score	Opposition Score	Opposition Score	Rank
Martin Strehársky; Samuel Andrejčík; Michaela Balcová	Mixed pairs BC4	Brazil (BRA); W 7-3	Portugal (POR); W 10-1	Great Britain (GBR); W 8-0	Canada (CAN); W 4-3	1 Q	—N/a	RPC (RPC); W 5-2	Hong Kong (HKG); W 3-2	1st place, gold medalist(s)
Tomáš Kráľ; Kristína Kudláčová; Rastislav Kurilák; Róbert Mezík	Team BC1/BC2	Japan (JPN); L 2-8	South Korea (KOR); L 3-3*	Brazil (BRA); L 4-5	Portugal (POR); W 6-3	4	—N/a	did not advance		

== Cycling ==
Slovakia sent one male and one female cyclist after successfully getting a slot in the 2018 UCI Nations Ranking Allocation quota for the European.

=== Road ===
Athlete	Event	Time	Rank
Patrik Kuril	Men's road race C4-5	2:22:35	7
Patrik Kuril	Men's time trial C4	45:47.10	1st place, gold medalist(s)
Jozef Metelka	Men's road race C4-5	DNF	
Jozef Metelka	Men's time trial C4	46:05.05	2nd place, silver medalist(s)
Ondrej Strečko	Men's road race C4-5	2:20:07	12
Ondrej Strečko	Men's time trial C5	48:07.86	8
Anna Oroszová	Women's road race H1-4	59:48	8
Anna Oroszová	Women's time trial H1-3	35:36.37	4

=== Track ===
Athlete	Event	Qualification		Final	
Athlete	Event	Time	Rank	Opposition Time	Rank
Jozef Metelka	Men's 1000 m time trial C4-5	N/A		1:04.786	3rd place, bronze medalist(s)
Jozef Metelka	Men's 4000 m individual pursuit C4	4:22.772 WR	1 Q	OVL	1st place, gold medalist(s)

== Shooting ==
Three Slovak shooters will compete after qualified in Men's 10m Air Rifle Standing SH1, Women's 10m Air Rifle Standing SH2 & Mixed 50m Rifle Prone SH2 events. The shooters names are Radoslav Malenovský, Veronika Vadovičová and Kristína Funková.

Athlete	Event	Qualification		Final	
Athlete	Event	Score	Rank	Score	Rank
Kristína Funková	Mixed R5 10m Air Rifle Prone SH2	632.9	15	did not advance	
Kristína Funková	Mixed R9 50m Rifle Prone SH2	617.1	19	did not advance	
Radoslav Malenovský	Men's R1 10m Air Rifle Standing SH1	618.5	3 Q	181.4	5
Radoslav Malenovský	Men's R7 50m Rifle 3 Positions SH1	1156-39x	7 Q	401.3	7
Radoslav Malenovský	Mixed R3 10m Air Rifle Prone SH1	629.1	29	did not advance	
Radoslav Malenovský	Mixed R6 50m Rifle Prone SH1	609.3	35	did not advance	
Veronika Vadovičová	Women's R2 10m Air Rifle Standing SH1	624.9	3 Q	206.0	4
Veronika Vadovičová	Women's R8 50m Rifle 3 Positions SH1	1163-59x	5 Q	412.0	6
Veronika Vadovičová	Mixed R3 10m Air Rifle Prone SH1	634.6	5 Q	167.7	6
Veronika Vadovičová	Mixed R6 50m Rifle Prone SH1	620.3	4 Q	248,9 PR	1st place, gold medalist(s)

== Swimming ==
One Slovak swimmer has successfully entered the paralympic slot after breaking the MQS.

Women

Athlete	Event	Heats		Final	
Athlete	Event	Result	Rank	Result	Rank
Tatiana Blattnerová	50 m freestyle S11	34.88	13	did not advance	
Tatiana Blattnerová	100 m freestyle S11	1:17.14	11	did not advance	
Tatiana Blattnerová	400 m freestyle S11	5:49.16	9	did not advance	
Tatiana Blattnerová	100 m backstroke S11	1:34.66	12	did not advance	
Tatiana Blattnerová	100 m breaststroke S11	1:36.52	9	did not advance	

== Table tennis ==
Slovakia entered five athletes into the table tennis competition at the games. All of them qualified via World Ranking allocation.

Men

Athlete	Event	Group Stage			Round 1	Quarterfinals	Semifinals	Final	
Athlete	Event	Opposition Result	Opposition Result	Rank	Opposition Result	Opposition Result	Opposition Result	Opposition Result	Rank
Martin Ludrovský	Individual C2	Chueawong (THA); W 3-1	Flores (CHI); L 2-3	2 Q	Molliens (FRA)} W 3-1	Park (KOR); L 2-3	did not advance		
Ján Riapoš	Individual C2	Cha (KOR); L 0-3	Minami (JPN); W 3-0	2 Q	Suchánek (CZE); L 2-3	did not advance			
Boris Trávníček	Individual C4	Chaiwut (THA); W 3-2	Guo (CHN); W 3-2	1 Q	Kim (KOR); W 3-1	Turan (TUR); L 0-3	did not advance		
Peter Mihálik	Individual C4	Kim (KOR); L 2-3	Lopez (ESP); L 1-3	3	did not advance				
Martin Ludrovský; Ján Riapoš	Team C1-2	—N/a				Borgato (ITA)/ Falco (ITA); W 2-0	Lamirault (FRA)/ Molliens (FRA); L 0-2	did not advance	3rd place, bronze medalist(s)
Boris Trávníček; Peter Mihálik	Team C4	—N/a			Saleh (EGY)/ Zenaty (EGY); W 2-0	Ozturk (TUR)/ Turan (TUR); W 2-0	Cao (CHN)/ Guo (CHN); L 0-2	did not advance	3rd place, bronze medalist(s)

Women

Athlete	Event	Group Stage			Round 1	Quarterfinals	Semifinals	Final	
Athlete	Event	Opposition Result	Opposition Result	Rank	Opposition Result	Opposition Result	Opposition Result	Opposition Result	Rank
Alena Kánová	Individual C3	Yoon (KOR); L 0-3	Santos (BRA); W 3-0	2 Q	Karić (CRO); W 3-1	Ahlquist (SWE); W 3-0	Lee (KOR); W 3-1	Juan (CHN); L 0-3	2nd place, silver medalist(s)

== Wheelchair tennis ==
Slovakia qualified one player entry for wheelchair tennis. Marek Gergely qualified under the bipartite commission invitation allocation quota.

Athlete	Event	Round of 64	Round of 32	Round of 16	Quarterfinals	Semifinals	Final / BM	
Athlete	Event	Opposition Result	Opposition Result	Opposition Result	Opposition Result	Opposition Result	Opposition Result	Rank
Marek Gergely	Men's singles	Diamantis (GRE); W 7-6, 3-6, 6-0	Kuneida (JPN); L 0-6, 1-6	did not advance				

== See also ==
- Slovakia at the Paralympics
- Slovakia at the 2020 Summer Olympics
