= Boccia at the 2016 Summer Paralympics – Pairs BC4 =

Boccia – Pairs BC4 at the XV Paralympic Games
- Venue: Sambodromo
- Dates: 13 September 2016 – 6 September 2016
- Competitors: 8 teams

Medalists
1st place, gold medalist(s)		Robert Durkovic; Michaela Balcova; Samuel Andrejcik	Slovakia
2nd place, silver medalist(s)		Dirceu Pinto; Eliseu dos Santos; Marcelo dos Santos	Brazil
3rd place, bronze medalist(s)		Pornchok Larpyen; Nuanchan Phonsila; Chaloemphon Tanbut	Thailand

The mixed pairs BC4 boccia event at the 2016 Summer Paralympics was contested from 13 September to 16 September at Sambodromo in Rio de Janeiro. 8 teams of competitors took part.... The event structure was amended from the 2012 event, with pool stages added. The top two teams from each of two pools then entered into a quarterfinal single-elimination stage, with the losing semifinalists playing off for bronze.

== Elimination stages ==
Semi finals
1	Great Britain	2
4	Brazil	4
3	Slovakia	6
2	Thailand	1

Gold medal match
4	Brazil	2
3	Slovakia	4
Bronze medal match
2	Thailand	3
1	Great Britain	2

== Pool stages ==
=== Pool A ===
Boccia at the 2016 Summer Paralympics - Mixed pairs BC4 - Pool A
Pos	Country	Player	Pld	W	D	L	PF	PA	PD	Pts	H2H	Player	(United Kingdom)	(Slovakia)	(Hong Kong)	(Portugal)
1 Q	Great Britain	Stephen Maguire; Evie Edwards; Kieran Steer	3	2	1	0	17	8	+29	8	H2H	(United Kingdom)		4-2	2-2	11-4
2 Q	Slovakia	Robert Durkovic; Michaela Balcova; Samuel Andrejcik	3	2	0	1	14	9	+5	7	H2H	(Slovakia)	2-4		4-1	8-4
3	Hong Kong	Wong Kwan Hang; Leung Yuk Wing; Lau Wai Yan	3	1	1	1	9	8	−1	6	H2H	(Hong Kong)	2-2	1-4		6-2
4	Portugal	Pedro Clara; Domingos Vieira; Carla Oliveira	3	0	0	3	10	25	−15	3	H2H	(Portugal)	4-11	4-8	2-6	

=== Pool B ===
Boccia at the 2016 Summer Paralympics - Mixed pairs BC4 - Pool B
Pos	Country	Player	Pld	W	D	L	PF	PA	PD	Pts	H2H	Player	(Thailand)	(Brazil)	(Canada)	(China)
1 Q	Thailand	Pornchok Larpyen; Nuanchan Phonsila; Chaloemphon Tanbut	3	3	0	0	17	8	+9	9	H2H	(Thailand)		4-2	7-3	6-2
2 Q	Brazil	Dirceu Pinto; Eliseu dos Santos; Marcelo dos Santos	3	1	1	1	10	11	-5	6	H2H	(Brazil)	2-4		4-3	4-4
3	Canada	Marco Dispaltro; Alsion Levine; Iulian Ciobanu	3	1	0	2	9	13	−4	5	H2H	(Canada)	3-7	3-4		3-2
4	China	Lin Ximei; Zheng Yuansen	3	0	1	2	8	13	−5	4	H2H	(China)	2-6	4-4	2-3	
