= Boccia at the 2012 Summer Paralympics – Pairs BC4 =

Boccia – Pairs BC4 at the XIV Paralympic Games
- Venue: ExCeL London
- Dates: 2 September 2012 – 4 September 2012
- Teams: 8

Medalists
1st place, gold medalist(s)		Dirceu José Pinto; Eliseu dos Santos	Brazil
2nd place, silver medalist(s)		Radek Procházka; Leoš Lacina	Czech Republic
3rd place, bronze medalist(s)		Marco Dispaltro; Josh Vander Vies	Canada

The mixed pairs BC4 boccia event at the 2012 Summer Paralympics was contested from 2 to 4 September at ExCeL London.

== Group stage ==
=== Group A ===
Team	Pld	W	L	PF	PA	PD
Eliseu dos Santos / Dirceu José Pinto (BRA)	3	3	0	26	4	22
Leos Lacina / Radek Procházka (CZE)	3	2	1	12	15	-3
Vivian (wai Yan) Lau / Yuk Wing Leung (HKG)	3	1	2	16	14	2
Susana Barroso / Domingos Vieira (POR)	3	0	3	2	23	-21

=== Group B ===
Team	Pld	W	L	PF	PA	PD
Marco Dispaltro / Josh vander Vies (CAN)	3	3	0	14	5	9
Peter McGuire / Stephen McGuire (GBR)	3	2	1	20	4	16
Pornchok Larpyen / Sataporn Yoojaroen (THA)	3	1	2	11	14	-3
Robert Durkovic / Martin Streharsky (SVK)	3	0	3	3	25	-22

== Knockout stage ==
Semifinals
A1	Brazil (BRA)	3
B2	Great Britain (GBR)	2
B1	Canada (CAN)	3
A2	Czech Republic (CZE)	3*

Gold medal match
A1	Brazil (BRA)	5
A2	Czech Republic (CZE)	3
Bronze medal match
B2	Great Britain (GBR)	2
B1	Canada (CAN)	8
