= Boccia at the 2016 Summer Paralympics =

Boccia at the XV Paralympic Games
- Venue: Riocentro, Barra Cluster
- Dates: 10–16 September 2016
- Competitors: 104

Boccia at the 2016 Summer Paralympics was held in Riocentro, in the Barra district of Rio de Janeiro in September 2016, with a maximum of 104 athletes (24 women, 80 gender unspecified) competing in seven events. The programme consisted of four individual events, two pairs events, and one team event, spread across four classifications.

== Classification ==
When competing in boccia at national or international level, the athletes were competing in events with different classifications, based on level of physical disability.

- BC1 - Cerebral palsy.
  - Locomotor dysfunction affecting the whole body.
  - Use hands or feet to propel the ball into play
  - May be assisted by an aide.
- BC2 - Cerebral palsy.
  - Locomotor dysfunction affecting the whole body
  - Use hands to propel the ball into play
  - Not assisted by an aide.
- BC3 - Cerebral palsy or another disability.
  - Locomotor dysfunction in all four limbs.
  - Use the help of a ramp to propel the ball into play.
  - Assisted by an aide (ramper).
- BC4 - Not cerebral palsy, but another disability, for example muscular dystrophy or tetraplegia.
  - Locomotor dysfunction in all four limbs
  - Use hands to propel the ball into play
  - Not assisted by an aide.

== Events ==
All events in boccia are mixed gender. there are four individual events, two pairs events and a combined classification team event.

Boccia at the 2016 Summer Paralympics - Events
| Classification | Events | | |
| Classification | Individual | Pairs | Team |
|---|---|---|---|
| BC1 | ● | —N/a | ● |
| BC2 | ● | —N/a | ● |
| BC3 | ● | ● | —N/a |
| BC4 | ● | ● | —N/a |

== Qualification ==
An NPC can enter one BC1/BC2 Team consisting of four athletes of which a minimum of one must be in the BC1 sport class. An NPC can enter one BC3 Pair consisting of three athletes. An NPC can enter one BC4 Pair consisting of three athletes.

The number of female athletes representing an NPC must be: - at least one female athlete for NPCs qualifying one Team or Pair; - at least two female athletes for NPCs qualifying two or three Team/Pairs.

An NPC can enter a maximum of three athletes in each of the Individual medal events.

=== Qualified teams ===
| Competition | | BC1/BC2 Team | | BC3 Pairs | | BC4 Pairs | |
| Competition | | Qualified Teams | Quota | Qualified Teams | Quota | Qualified Teams | Quota |
|---|---|---|---|---|---|---|---|
| Host Nation | | Brazil (BRA) | 4 | Brazil (BRA) | 3 | Brazil (BRA) | 3 |
| BISFED 2015 Boccia Regional Championships | Europe (United Kingdom) London | Great Britain (GBR) | 4 | Belgium (BEL) | 3 | Slovakia (SVK) | 3 |
| BISFED 2015 Boccia Regional Championships | Asia Hong Kong | Thailand (THA) | 4 | South Korea (KOR) | 3 | China (CHN) | 3 |
| BISFED 2015 Boccia Regional Championships | Americas (Canada) Montreal | Argentina (ARG) | 4 | ~~Brazil (BRA)~~; Canada (CAN) | 3 | Canada (CAN) | 3 |
| BISFED 2015 Boccia World Team Rankings 30 April 2016 | | Slovakia (SVK); Portugal (POR); Spain (ESP); Japan (JPN); China (CHN); South Korea (KOR); Hong Kong (HKG); Netherlands (NED) | 32 | Greece (GRE); Portugal (POR); Great Britain (GBR); Singapore (SIN) | 12 | Hong Kong (HKG); Great Britain (GBR); Thailand (THA); Hungary (HUN) | 12 |
| BISFED 2015 Boccia World Individual Rankings 30 April 2016 | | BC1; Greece (GRE); Norway (NOR) BC2; Israel (ISR); Mexico (MEX); Canada (CAN) | 5 | Japan (JPN); Hong Kong (HKG); Czech Republic (CZE); Sweden (SWE); Australia (AUS) | 5 | South Korea (KOR); Portugal (POR) | 2 |
| Total Athletes - 108 | | | 53 | | 29 | | 26 |

== Competition schedule ==
Competition lasts from 10 to 16 September. Each day contains a morning and afternoon session.

| OC | Opening ceremony | Preliminaries | ● | finals | CC | Closing ceremony |

| September 2016 | 7 Wed | 8 Thu | 9 Fri | 10 Sat | 11 Sun | 12 Mon | 13 Tue | 14 Wed | 15 Thu | 16 Fri | 17 Sat | 18 Sun | Gold medals |
|---|---|---|---|---|---|---|---|---|---|---|---|---|---|
| Boccia | OC | | | | | ● ● ● | | | | ● ● ● ● | | CC | 7 |

== Participating nations ==
103 athletes from 23 nations competed.

- Argentina (4)
- Australia (1)
- Belgium (3)
- Bermuda (1)
- Brazil (10)
- Canada (6)
- China (6)
- Czech Republic (2)
- Great Britain (10)
- Greece (5)
- Hong Kong (8)
- Israel (1)
- Japan (5)
- Mexico (1)
- Netherlands (3)
- Norway (1)
- Portugal (10)
- Singapore (2)
- Slovakia (7)
- South Korea (8)
- Spain (4)
- Sweden (1)
- Thailand (7)

== Medal summary ==
The Boccia tournament in Rio 2016 was dominated by the traditional Asian powers, with four golds, three of the four individual titles, and nine medals in total, shared between Thailand, South Korea and Hong Kong. Great Britain took the other individual gold in the Individual BC1 class through David Smith, while Slovakia and hosts Brazil shared the two pairs titles on offer.

=== Medalists ===
| Event | Class | Gold | Silver | Bronze |
|---|---|---|---|---|
| Individual | BC1 | David Smith; Great Britain | Daniel Perez; Netherlands | Yoo Won-jeong; South Korea |
| Individual | BC2 | Watcharaphon Vongsa; Thailand | Worawut Saengampa; Thailand | Yan Zhiqiang; China |
| Individual | BC3 | Jeong Ho-won; South Korea | Grigorios Polychronidis; Greece | José Carlos Macedo; Portugal |
| Individual | BC4 | Leung Yuk Wing; Hong Kong | Samuel Andrejcik; Slovakia | Pornchok Larpyen; Thailand |
| Pairs | BC3 | Brazil; Evelyn de Oliveira; Evani Soares da Silva; Antônio Leme | South Korea; Jeong Ho-won; Kim Han-soo; Choi Ye-jin | Greece; Anna Ntenta; Nikolaos Pananos; Grigorios Polychronidis |
| Pairs | BC4 | Slovakia; Róbert Ďurkovič; Michaela Balcová; Samuel Andrejčík | Brazil; Dirceu Pinto; Eliseu dos Santos; Marcelo dos Santos | Thailand; Pornchok Larpyen; Nuanchan Phonsila; Chaloemphon Tanbut |
| Team | BC1–2 | Thailand; Pattaya Tadtong; Watcharaphon Vongsa; Worawut Saengampa; Supin Tipmanee | Japan; Takayuki Kitani; Takayuki Hirose; Yuriko Fujii; Hidetaka Sugimura | Portugal; Abílio Valente; António Marques; Cristina Gonçalves; Fernando Ferreira |

=== Medal table ===
* Host nation (Brazil)

| Rank | NPC | Gold | Silver | Bronze | Total |
|---|---|---|---|---|---|
| 1 | Thailand | 2 | 1 | 2 | 5 |
| 2 | South Korea | 1 | 1 | 1 | 3 |
| 3 | Brazil* | 1 | 1 | 0 | 2 |
| 3 | Slovakia | 1 | 1 | 0 | 2 |
| 5 | Great Britain | 1 | 0 | 0 | 1 |
| 5 | Hong Kong | 1 | 0 | 0 | 1 |
| 7 | Greece | 0 | 1 | 1 | 2 |
| 8 | Japan | 0 | 1 | 0 | 1 |
| 8 | Netherlands | 0 | 1 | 0 | 1 |
| 10 | Portugal | 0 | 0 | 2 | 2 |
| 11 | China | 0 | 0 | 1 | 1 |
| Totals (11 entries) | | 7 | 7 | 7 | 21 |
