= Boccia at the 2014 Asian Para Games =

- Location: South Korea

Boccia at the 2014 Asian Para Games were held in South Korea.

== Medals ==
Rank	Nation	Gold	Silver	Bronze	Total
1	Thailand (THA)	3	3	1	7
2	Hong Kong (HKG)	2	1	2	5
3	South Korea (KOR)	2	1	1	4
4	China (CHN)	0	1	3	4
5	Japan (JPN)	0	1	0	1
Totals (5 entries)		7	7	7	21

== Medalists ==
Event	Gold	Silver	Bronze
Individual BC1	Pattaya Tadtong; Thailand	Witsanu Huadpradit; Thailand	Sun Kai; China
Individual BC2	Worawut Saengampa; Thailand	Watcharaphon Vongsa; Thailand	Yan Zhiqiang; China
Individual BC3	Kim Jun-yup; South Korea	Jeong Ho-won; South Korea	Kim Han-soo; South Korea
Individual BC4	Leung Yuk Wing; Hong Kong	Vivian Lau Wai-yan; Hong Kong	Pornchok Larpyen; Thailand
Pairs BC3	South Korea (KOR); Jeong Ho-won; Kim Han-soo; Kim Jun-yup	Japan (JPN); Keita Kato; Kaede Matsunaga; Junpei Nara	Hong Kong (HKG); Ho Yuen Kei; Liu Wing Tung; Tsang Ling Yan
Pairs BC4	Hong Kong (HKG); Vivian Lau Wai-yan; Leung Yuk Wing; Wong Kwan Hang	Thailand (THA); Akom Hoythong; Pornchok Larpyen; Chaloemphon Tanbut	China (CHN); Lin Ximei; Zheng Yuansen
Team BC1-2	Thailand (THA); Witsanu Huadpradit; Mongkol Jitsa-Ngiem; Worawut Saengampa; Pattaya Tadtong; Watcharaphon Vongsa	China (CHN); Sun Kai; Yan Zhiqiang; Zhang Qi; Zhong Kai	Hong Kong (HKG); Kwok Hoi Ying Karen; Leung Mei Yee; Ng Chi Hang; Wong Kam Lung; Yeung Hiu Lam
