= Boccia at the 2015 Parapan American Games =

- Venue: Abilities Centre
- Dates: August 8 to 11
- Competitors: 48 from 8 nations

Boccia competitions at the 2015 Parapan American Games in Toronto were held from August 8 to 11 at the Abilities Centre, in Whitby, Ontario. All Boccia competitions were mixed (men and women competed together equally).

== Medal table ==
* Host nation (Canada)

Rank	Nation	Gold	Silver	Bronze	Total
1	Brazil	6	0	3	9
2	Canada*	1	4	1	6
3	Colombia	0	2	0	2
4	Argentina	0	1	2	3
5	Mexico	0	0	1	1
Totals (5 entries)		7	7	7	21

== Medalists ==
Event	Gold	Silver	Bronze
Team BC1/BC2	Brazil; José Carlos Chagas; Maciel De Souza Santos; Lucas Ferreira De Araujo; Guilherme Germano Moraes	Argentina; Jonatan Aquino; Sebastián Gonzalez; Mauricio Ibarbure; Roberto Leglise	Canada; Adam Dukovich; Chris Halpen; Hanif Mawji; Tammy McLeod
Pairs BC3	Canada; Eric Bussiere; Bruno Garneau; Paul Gauthier	Colombia; Angie Aya Cardozo; Juan Rodriguez Rivera; Jesús Romero	Brazil; Antonio Leme; Daniele Martins; Richardson Santos
Pairs BC4	Brazil; Eliseu Dos Santos; Marcelo Dos Santos; Dirceu Pinto	Canada; Marco Dispaltro; Alison Levine; Caroline Vietnieks	Argentina; José Buzzo; Ivan Costa; Tadeo Villagra
Individual BC1	José Carlos Chagas; Brazil	Hanif Majwi; Canada	Eduardo Ventura; Mexico
Individual BC2	Maciel de Souza Santos; Brazil	Adam Dukovich; Canada	Sebastián Gonzalez; Argentina
Individual BC3	Richardson Santos; Brazil	Eric Bussiere; Canada	Antônio Leme; Brazil
Individual BC4	Eliseu dos Santos; Brazil	Euclides Grisales; Colombia	Marcelo dos Santos; Brazil

== Participating nations ==
A total of 8 nations qualified athletes.

- Argentina (10 athletes)
- Bermuda (2)
- Brazil (10)
- Canada (10)
- Colombia (4)
- Mexico (6)
- United States (5)
- Venezuela (1)

== 2016 Summer Paralympics qualification ==
This event served as a ranking event for the individual events. The rankings would eventually determine who qualified for the Games.

== See also ==
- Boccia at the 2016 Summer Paralympics
