= Alison Levine (boccia) =

Canadian boccia competitor

Personal information
- Born: May 11, 1990 (age 36)
- Home town: Côte Saint-Luc, Quebec, Canada
- Website: alisonlevine.ca

Sport
- Sport: Boccia
- Disability class: BC4
Medal record
Women's boccia
Representing Canada
Parapan American Games
| Gold medal – first place | 2023 Santiago | Individual BC4 |
| Gold medal – first place | 2023 Santiago | Pairs BC4 |
| Silver medal – second place | 2015 Toronto | Pairs BC4 |
| Bronze medal – third place | 2019 Lima | Pairs BC4 |

Alison Levine (born May 11, 1990) is a Canadian boccia competitor.

== Early life and education ==
Levine grew up in Côte Saint-Luc, Quebec. She attended JPPS Elementary School and Bialik High School. She was diagnosed with idiopathic muscular dystrophy as a teenager. She graduated from Vanier College's Special Care Counselling program in 2013.

== Career ==
Levine threw boccia for the first time in December 2012. Her first medal was won in pairs with Marco Dispaltro at the 2013 national championship in Montreal. In 2014, she won a bronze medal in pairs at the Masters in Portugal. She won an individual silver medal at the European World Open in Poland in 2015, where she also won silver in the pairs competition. That same year, she won pairs silver at the Parapan American Games in Toronto. Going into her Paralympic debut in 2016, Levine was ranked 15th in the world in individual mixed BC4 boccia. She placed fifth at the 2016 Summer Paralympics in individuals BC4 boccia and sixth in pairs BC4, with Dispaltro and Iulian Ciobanu.

She won her first gold medal at a Boccia World Open event at the Montreal World Open in 2019. In 2019, she was ranked number one in the world by the Boccia International Sports Federation in the BC4 division, the first woman to be ranked first in the world in her disability class in the then mixed-sex sport. She entered the 2020 Summer Paralympics as the top ranked player in the world in the BC4 class, as well as being the top ranked female in the world. Levine competed in the boccia mixed BC4 individual event at the 2020 Summer Paralympics. She did not qualify for the quarter-finals after the group play stage. Levine and Ciobanu did not advance to the semi-finals in pairs BC4 at the Paralympics.

In 2022, Levine won gold she won at the São Paulo Americas Regional Championships, silver at the Rio de Janeiro World Cup, and Povoa de Varzim World Cup. She placed fourth in singles BC4 and won bronze with Ciobanu in BC4 pairs at the Rio de Janeiro 2022 World Boccia Championships. At the 2023 Parapan American Games, Levine won gold medals in BC4 pairs with Ciobanu and BC4 singles. She was chosen as Canada's flag bearer for the Games' closing ceremony.

Levine is the namesake of the Alison pant, a type of pants designed by Lululemon Athletica for use by the Canadian Olympic and Paralympic teams in 2024. At the 2024 Summer Paralympics, she made it to the women’s individual BC4 quarterfinals, but was eliminated after losing to Leidy Chica, the world number one ranked women’s BC4 boccia athlete. In mixed pairs BC4, Ciobanu and Levine placed fourth, losing to Thailand in the bronze medal match.
