= Boccia at the 2020 Summer Paralympics =

Boccia at the XVI Paralympic Games
- Boccia pictogram of the 2020 Summer Paralympics
- Venue: Ariake Gymnastics Centre
- Dates: 28 August – 4 September 2021
- Competitors: 116 in 7 events

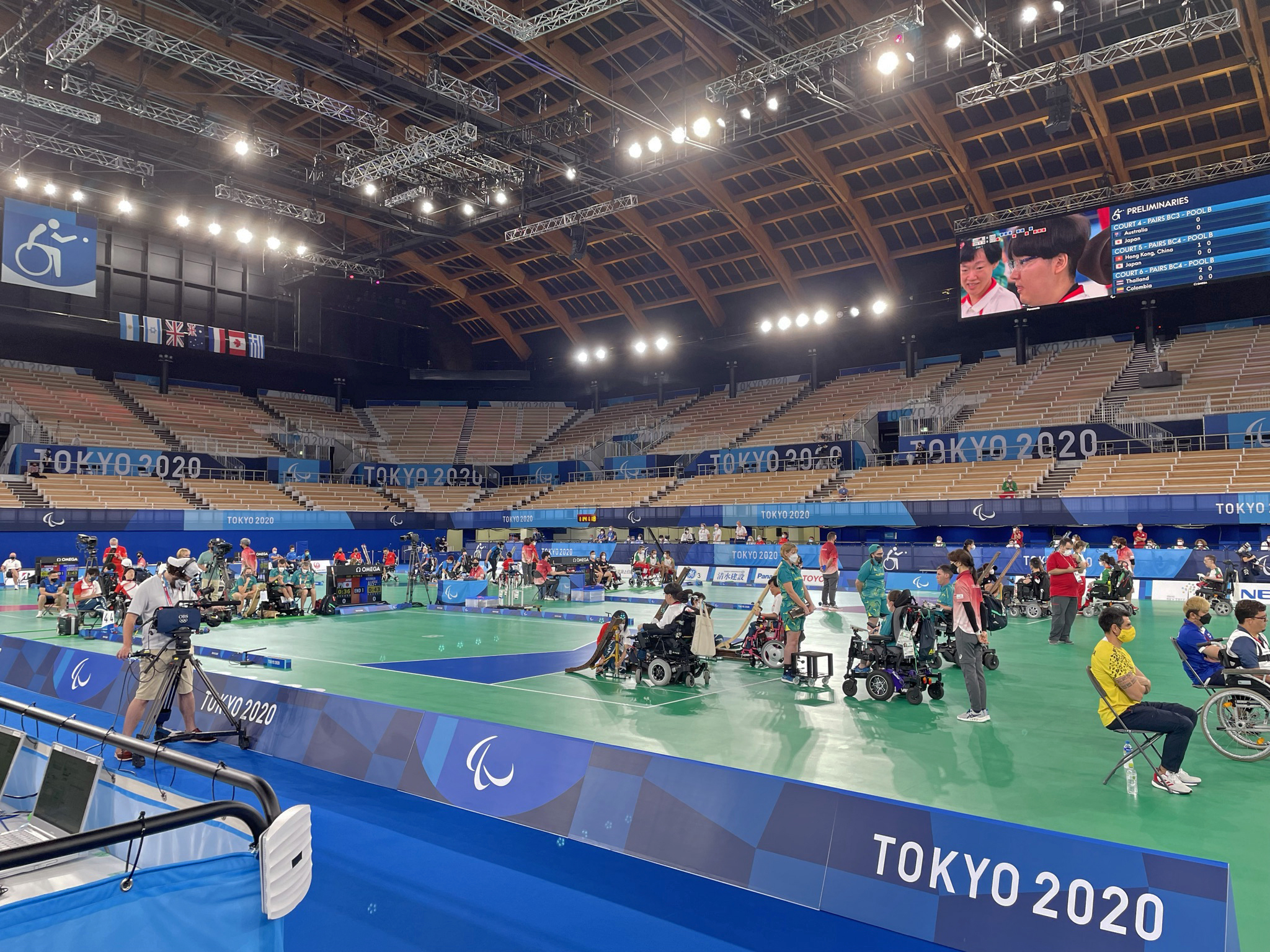
A mixed pairs BC3 match at the Tokyo 2020 Paralympic Games.

Boccia at the 2020 Summer Paralympics in Tokyo, Japan, took place at the Ariake Gymnastics Centre. There were expected to be 116 qualification slots (34 females, 82 gender free) across seven mixed events: four individual events, two pairs events and one team event.

While the 2020 Summer Olympic and Paralympic Games were postponed to 2021 due to the COVID-19 pandemic, they kept the 2020 name and were held from 24 August to 5 September 2021.

== Classification ==
When competing in boccia at national or international level, the athletes were competing in events with different classifications, based on level of physical disability.

- BC1 - Cerebral palsy.
  - Locomotor dysfunction affecting the whole body.
  - Use hands or feet to propel the ball into play
  - May be assisted by an aide.
- BC2 - Cerebral palsy.
  - Locomotor dysfunction affecting the whole body
  - Use hands to propel the ball into play
  - Not assisted by an aide.
- BC3 - Cerebral palsy or another disability.
  - Locomotor dysfunction in all four limbs.
  - Use the help of a ramp to propel the ball into play.
  - Assisted by an aide (ramper).
- BC4 - Not cerebral palsy, but another disability, for example muscular dystrophy or tetraplegia.
  - Locomotor dysfunction in all four limbs
  - Use hands to propel the ball into play
  - Not assisted by an aide.

== Schedule ==
| P | Preliminaries | ¼ | Quarter-finals | ½ | Semi-finals | F | Final |

| Event | Date | | | | | | | | | | | | | | |
| Event | Wed 25 Aug | Thu 26 Aug | Fri 27 Aug | Sat 28 Aug | Sun 29 Aug | Mon 30 Aug | Tue 31 Aug | | | Wed 1 Sep | Thu 2 Sep | Fri 3 Sep | Sat 4 Sep | | Sun 5 Sep |
|---|---|---|---|---|---|---|---|---|---|---|---|---|---|---|---|
| Individual BC1 | | | | P | | | | ¼ | ½ | F | | | | | |
| Individual BC2 | | | | P | | | ¼ | ½ | | F | | | | | |
| Individual BC3 | | | | P | | | ¼ | ½ | | F | | | | | |
| Individual BC4 | | | | P | | | ¼ | ½ | | F | | | | | |
| Pairs BC3 | | | | | | | | | | | P | | ½ | F | |
| Pairs BC4 | | | | | | | | | | | P | | ½ | F | |
| Team BC1/BC2 | | | | | | | | | | | P | | ½ | F | |

== Medals ==
* Host nation (Japan)

| Rank | NPC | Gold | Silver | Bronze | Total |
|---|---|---|---|---|---|
| 1 | Slovakia | 2 | 0 | 0 | 2 |
| 2 | Thailand | 1 | 2 | 0 | 3 |
| 3 | Japan* | 1 | 1 | 1 | 3 |
| 4 | Czech Republic | 1 | 0 | 0 | 1 |
| 4 | Great Britain | 1 | 0 | 0 | 1 |
| 4 | South Korea | 1 | 0 | 0 | 1 |
| 7 | Greece | 0 | 1 | 1 | 2 |
| 7 | Hong Kong | 0 | 1 | 1 | 2 |
| 9 | China | 0 | 1 | 0 | 1 |
| 9 | Malaysia | 0 | 1 | 0 | 1 |
| 11 | Brazil | 0 | 0 | 2 | 2 |
| 12 | Australia | 0 | 0 | 1 | 1 |
| 12 | RPC | 0 | 0 | 1 | 1 |
| Totals (13 entries) | | 7 | 7 | 7 | 21 |

== Medalists ==
| Event | Class | Gold | Silver | Bronze |
|---|---|---|---|---|
| Mixed individual | BC1 | David Smith; Great Britain | Chew Wei Lun; Malaysia | José Carlos Chagas de Oliveira; Brazil |
| Mixed individual | BC2 | Hidetaka Sugimura; Japan | Watcharaphon Vongsa; Thailand | Maciel Santos; Brazil |
| Mixed individual | BC3 | Adam Peška; Czech Republic | Grigorios Polychronidis; Greece | Daniel Michel; Australia |
| Mixed individual | BC4 | Samuel Andrejčík; Slovakia | Pornchok Larpyen; Thailand | Leung Yuk Wing; Hong Kong |
| Mixed pairs | BC3 | South Korea; Jeong Ho-won; Kim Han-soo; Choi Ye-jin | Japan; Kazuki Takahashi; Keisuke Kawamoto; Keiko Tanaka | Greece; Grigorios Polychronidis; Anna Ntenta; Anastasia Pyrgiotis |
| Mixed pairs | BC4 | Slovakia; Samuel Andrejčík; Michaela Balcová; Martin Strehársky | Hong Kong; Leung Yuk Wing; Vivian Lau Wai-yan; Wong Kwan Hang | RPC; Sergey Safin; Ivan Frolov; Daria Adonina |
| Mixed team | BC1–2 | Thailand; Witsanu Huadpradit; Watcharaphon Vongsa; Worawut Saengampa; Subin Tipmanee | China; Zhang Qi; Yan Zhiqiang; Lan Zhijian | Japan; Takumi Nakamura; Yuriko Fujii; Hidetaka Sugimura; Takayuki Hirose |
