= Boccia at the 2024 Summer Paralympics – Pairs BC4 =

Event at the 2024 Summer Paralympics

Boccia – Mixed pairs BC4 at the XVII Paralympic Games
- Venue: South Paris Arena
- Date: 2–4 September 2024
- Competitors: 24 from 12 nations

Medalists
1st place, gold medalist(s)		Edilson Chica; Leidy Chica	Colombia
2nd place, silver medalist(s)		Leung Yuk Wing; Cheung Yuen	Hong Kong
3rd place, bronze medalist(s)		Pornchok Larpyen; Nuanchan Phonsila	Thailand

The mixed pairs BC4 boccia event at the 2024 Summer Paralympics will be contested between 2 and 4 September 2024 at the South Paris Arena. Since this event is a mixed event, both genders, male and female, compete in the event.

The competition starts with a pools stage, containing four pools with three teams each, followed by an eight-team elimination stage.

== Rosters ==
Each team contains two athletes. All team have a male (M) and female (F) athlete.

Team	Athletes	Team	Athletes	Team	Athletes
Brazil	Andre Costa; Laissa Polyana Teixeira	Canada	Iulian Ciobanu; Alison Levine	Colombia	Edilson Chica; Leidy Chica
Croatia	Anamaria Arambasic; Davor Komar	Egypt	Mahmoud Allam; Hanaa Elfar	Hong Kong, China	Cheung Yuen; Leung Yuk Wing
Malaysia	Abdul Rahman; Noor Askuzaimey Mat Salim	China	Lin Ximei; Zheng Yuansen	Slovakia	Martin Streharsky; Kristina Vozarova
Spain	Vasile Agache; Sara Aller Mayo	Thailand	Pornchok Larpyen; Nuanchan Phonsila	Ukraine	Artem Kolinko; Nataliia Konenko

== Classification ==
The BC4 classification is described as follows:

BC4M/F – Players in this class have severe locomotor dysfunction of all four extremities as well as poor trunk control. They can demonstrate sufficient dexterity to throw the ball onto the court. Players are not eligible for assistance.

== Results ==
=== Pools ===
The pool stage will be played between 3 and 4 September where the top 2 teams in each pool will qualify for the quarterfinals.

Pool A

Pos	Player	Pld	W	D	L	PF	PA	PD	Pts	Qualification	(Colombia)	(Ukraine)	(Malaysia)
1	Colombia	1	1	0	0	5	2	+3	2	Qualification for quarterfinal	—		5–2
2	Ukraine	1	0	0	1	4	5	−1	0	Qualification for quarterfinal		—	4–5
3	Malaysia	2	1	0	1	7	9	−2	2	Eliminated	2–5	5–4	—

Updated to match(es) played on 27 August 2024. Source: team---bc1-2 Paris 2024

Pool B

Pos	Player	Pld	W	D	L	PF	PA	PD	Pts	Qualification	(Canada)	(Croatia)	(China)
1	Canada	1	1	0	0	8	5	+3	2	Qualification for quarterfinal	—		8–5
2	Croatia	1	0	0	1	0	7	−7	0	Qualification for quarterfinal		—	0–7
3	China	2	1	0	1	12	8	+4	2	Eliminated	5–8	7–0	—

Updated to match(es) played on 27 August 2024. Source: Paris 2024

Pool C

Pos	Player	Pld	W	D	L	PF	PA	PD	Pts	Qualification	(Hong Kong)	(Brazil)	(Egypt)
1	Hong Kong	1	1	0	0	8	1	+7	2	Qualification for quarterfinal	—		8–1
2	Brazil	1	0	0	1	2	3	−1	0	Qualification for quarterfinal		—	2–2*
3	Egypt	2	1	0	1	4	10	−6	2	Eliminated	1–8	2*–2	—

Updated to match(es) played on 27 August 2024. Source: Paris 2024

Pool D

Pos	Player	Pld	W	D	L	PF	PA	PD	Pts	Qualification	(Thailand)	(Slovakia)	(Spain)
1	Thailand	1	1	0	0	8	2	+6	2	Qualification for quarterfinal	—		8–2
2	Slovakia	1	1	0	0	6	2	+4	2	Qualification for quarterfinal		—	6–2
3	Spain	2	0	0	2	4	14	−10	0	Eliminated	2–8	2–6	—

Updated to match(es) played on 27 August 2024. Source: Paris 2024

=== Elimination stage ===
The final stage (or knockout stage) will be played between 4 and 5 September>

Quarter-finals
4 September, South Paris Arena
Colombia	7
China	3
4 September, South Paris Arena
Thailand	11
Egypt	0
4 September, South Paris Arena
Canada	6
Ukraine	0
4 September, South Paris Arena
Hong Kong	10
Slovakia	2

Semi-finals
4 September, South Paris Arena
Colombia	4
Thailand	1
4 September, South Paris Arena
Canada	4
Hong Kong	6

Final
5 September, South Paris Arena
Colombia	6
Hong Kong	1
Bronze medal
5 September, South Paris Arena
Canada	1
Thailand	6

Elimination Matches

Quarterfinals

Match QF1:
Player/End	1	2	3	4	Result	Report
Colombia	1	4	2	0	7	Report
China	0	0	1	2	3	Report
Match QF2:
Player/End	1	2	3	4	Result	Report
Thailand	5	2	3	1	11	Report
Egypt	0	0	0	0	0	Report
Match QF3:
Player/End	1	2	3	4	Result	Report
Canada	1	2	2	1	6	Report
Ukraine	0	0	0	0	0	Report
Match QF4:
Player/End	1	2	3	4	Result	Report
Hong Kong	0	5	5	0	10	Report
Slovakia	1	0	0	1	2	Report

Semifinals

Match SF1:
Player/End	1	2	3	4	Result	Report
Colombia	2	1	1	0	4	Report
Thailand	0	0	0	1	1	Report
Match SF2:
Player/End	1	2	3	4	Result	Report
Canada	3	0	0	1	4	Report
Hong Kong	0	4	2	0	6	Report

Finals

Bronze medal match:
Player/End	1	2	3	4	Result	Report
Canada	0	1	0	0	1	Report
Thailand	1	1	3	1	6	Report
Gold medal match:
Player/End	1	2	3	4	Result	Report
Hong Kong	0	0	0	1	1	Report
Colombia	1	1	4	0	6	Report
