= Boccia at the 2020 Summer Paralympics – Mixed individual BC2 =

Boccia at the XVI Paralympic Games
- Venue: Ariake Gymnastics Centre
- Dates: 28 August - 4 September
- Competitors: 24 from 14 nations

Medalists
1st place, gold medalist(s)		Hidetaka Sugimura	Japan
2nd place, silver medalist(s)		Watcharaphon Vongsa	Thailand
3rd place, bronze medalist(s)		Maciel Santos	Brazil

The mixed individual BC2 boccia event at the 2020 Summer Paralympics is taking place between 28 August to 4 September at Ariake Gymnastics Centre in Tokyo. 24 competitors took part.

== Final stage ==
The knockout stage will be played between 30 August to 1 September.

Quarter-finals
Worawut Saengampa (THA)	8
Zhijian Lan (CHN)	5
Watcharaphon Vongsa (THA)	6
Dmitry Kozmin (RPC)	4
Hidetaka Sugimura (JPN)	8
Róbert Mezík (SVK)	1
Maciel Santos (BRA)	6
Hiu Lam Yeung (HKG)	5

Semi-finals
Worawut Saengampa (THA)	3
Watcharaphon Vongsa (THA)	4
Hidetaka Sugimura (JPN)	3
Maciel Santos (BRA)	2

Finals
Watcharaphon Vongsa (THA)	0
Hidetaka Sugimura (JPN)	5
Third place match
Worawut Saengampa (THA)	3
Maciel Santos (BRA)	4

== Pool stages ==
=== Pool A ===
Boccia at the 2020 Summer Paralympics – Individual BC2 pool A
Pos	Player	Pld	W	L	PF	PA	PD	H2H	Player	(Thailand)	(Slovakia)	(Belgium)	(United Kingdom)
1 Q	W. Saengampa (THA)	3	3	0	28	6	+22	H2H	(Thailand)		10-4	2*-2	16-0
2 Q	Róbert Mezík (SVK)	3	2	1	20	15	+5	H2H	(Slovakia)	4-10		10-2	6-3
3	F. Rombouts (BEL)	3	1	2	12	13	-1	H2H	(Belgium)	2-2*	2-10		8-1
4	Will Hipwell (GBR)	3	0	3	4	30	−26	H2H	(United Kingdom)	0-16	3-6	1-8	

=== Pool B ===
Boccia at the 2020 Summer Paralympics – Individual BC2 pool B
Pos	Player	Pld	W	L	PF	PA	PD	H2H	Player	(Japan)	(Portugal)	(Canada)	(Russia)
1 Q	H. Sugimura (JPN)	3	3	0	24	5	+19	H2H	(Japan)		6-1	6-4	12-0
2	C. Goncalves (POR)	3	2	1	17	13	+4	H2H	(Portugal)	1-6		8-4	8-3
3	Danik Allard (CAN)	3	1	2	20	15	+5	H2H	(Canada)	4-6	4-8		12-1
4	Diana Tsyplina (RPC)	3	0	3	4	32	−28	H2H	(Russia)	0-16	3-8	1-12	

=== Pool C ===
Boccia at the 2020 Summer Paralympics – Individual BC2 pool C
Pos	Player	Pld	W	L	PF	PA	PD	H2H	Player	(Brazil)	(Argentina)	(South Korea)	(United Kingdom)
1 Q	Maciel Santos (BRA)	3	3	0	25	2	+23	H2H	(Brazil)		6-1	11-0	8-1
2	Luis Cristaldo (ARG)	3	2	1	12	8	+4	H2H	(Argentina)	1-6		6-0	5-2
3	Yongjin Lee (KOR)	3	1	2	3	19	−16	H2H	(South Korea)	0-11	0-6		3-2
4	Claire Taggart (GBR)	3	0	3	5	16	-11	H2H	(United Kingdom)	1-8	2-5	2-3	

=== Pool D ===
Boccia at the 2020 Summer Paralympics – Individual BC2 pool D
Pos	Player	Pld	W	L	PF	PA	PD	H2H	Player	(Thailand)	(Israel)	(Portugal)	(Brazil)
1 Q	W. Vongsa (THA)	3	3	0	33	0	+33	H2H	(Thailand)		10-0	9-0	14-0
2	Nadav Levi (ISR)	3	2	1	13	12	+1	H2H	(Israel)	0-10		5-2	8-0
3	N. Fernandez (POR)	3	1	2	5	15	-10	H2H	(Portugal)	0-9	2-5		3-1
4	Natali de Faria (BRA)	3	0	3	1	25	−24	H2H	(Brazil)	0-14	0-8	1-3	

=== Pool E ===
Boccia at the 2020 Summer Paralympics – Individual BC2 pool E
Pos	Player	Pld	W	L	PF	PA	PD	H2H	Player	RPC	(China)	(Argentina)	(China)
1 Q	Dmitry Kozmin (RPC)	3	3	0	13	5	+8	H2H	RPC		4-3	3-2	6-0
2 Q	Zhijian Lan (CHN)	3	2	1	13	7	+6	H2H	(China)	3-4		4-3	6-0
3	Jonatan Aquino (ARG)	3	1	2	11	7	+4	H2H	(Argentina)	2-3	3-4		6-0
DSQ	Zhiqiang Yan (CHN)	3	0	3	0	18	-18	H2H	(China)	0-6	0-6	0-6	

=== Pool F ===
Boccia at the 2020 Summer Paralympics – Individual BC2 pool F
Pos	Player	Pld	W	L	PF	PA	PD	H2H	Player	(Hong Kong)	(Japan)	(Slovakia)	(Portugal)
1 Q	Hiu Lam Yeung (HKG)	3	3	0	17	5	+12	H2H	(Hong Kong)		6-1	7-1	4-3
2	Takayuki Hirose (JPN)	3	2	1	13	7	+6	H2H	(Japan)	1-6		4-3	7-0
3	Rastislav Kurilák (SVK)	3	1	2	11	13	-2	H2H	(Slovakia)	1-7	3-4		7-2
4	Abilio Valente (POR)	3	0	3	7	18	−11	H2H	(Portugal)	3-4	2-7	2-7	
