= Wong Kwan Hang =

Hong Kong boccia player

Personal information
- Born: 19 May 1992 (age 34) Hong Kong

Sport
- Sport: Boccia
- Disability class: BC4
Medal record
Boccia
Representing Hong Kong
Paralympic Games
Silver medal – second place	2020 Tokyo	Pairs BC4
World Championships
Gold medal – first place	2014 Beijing	Pairs BC4
Bronze medal – third place	2018 Liverpool	Pairs BC4
Asian Para Games
Gold medal – first place	2014 Incheon	Pairs BC4

Wong Kwan Hang (born 19 May 1992) is a Hong Kong boccia player.

At the 2020 Summer Paralympics, he won the silver medal in the pairs event alongside Leung Yuk Wing and Vivian Lau Wai-yan.
