= Daria Adonina =

Russian Boccia player (born 2002)

Medal record

Representing Russia

Boccia

Paralympic Games
Bronze medal – third place	2020 Tokyo	Mixed pairs BC4

Daria Adonina (born 13 November 2002) is a Russian Boccia player, who won bronze medal in the Mixed pairs BC4 event at the 2020 Summer Paralympics.
