= Nuanchan Phonsila =

Thai Paralympic boccia player

Personal information
- Born: 20 July 1977 (age 48) Kalasin, Thailand

Sport
- Sport: Boccia
- Disability class: BC4
Medal record
Men's boccia
Representing Thailand
Paralympic Games
Bronze medal – third place	2016 Rio de Janeiro	Pairs BC4
Bronze medal – third place	2024 Paris	Pairs BC4
Asian Para Games
Bronze medal – third place	2018 Jakarta	Pairs BC4
Bronze medal – third place	2022 Hangzhou	Pairs BC4

Nuanchan Phonsila (born 20 July 1977) is a Thai boccia player.

== Career ==
Phonsila represented Thailand at the 2024 Summer Paralympics and won a bronze medal in the pairs BC4 event.
