= Ivan Frolov =

Russian Boccia player (born 1992)

Medal record

Representing Russia

Boccia

Paralympic Games
Bronze medal – third place	2020 Tokyo	Mixed pairs BC4

Ivan Frolov (born 21 September 1992) is a Russian Boccia player, who won bronze medal in the Mixed pairs BC4 event at the 2020 Summer Paralympics.

He competed at the 2019 Olbia Boccia Regional Open, winning a gold medal.
