= Marcelo dos Santos (boccia) =

Paralympic boccia player

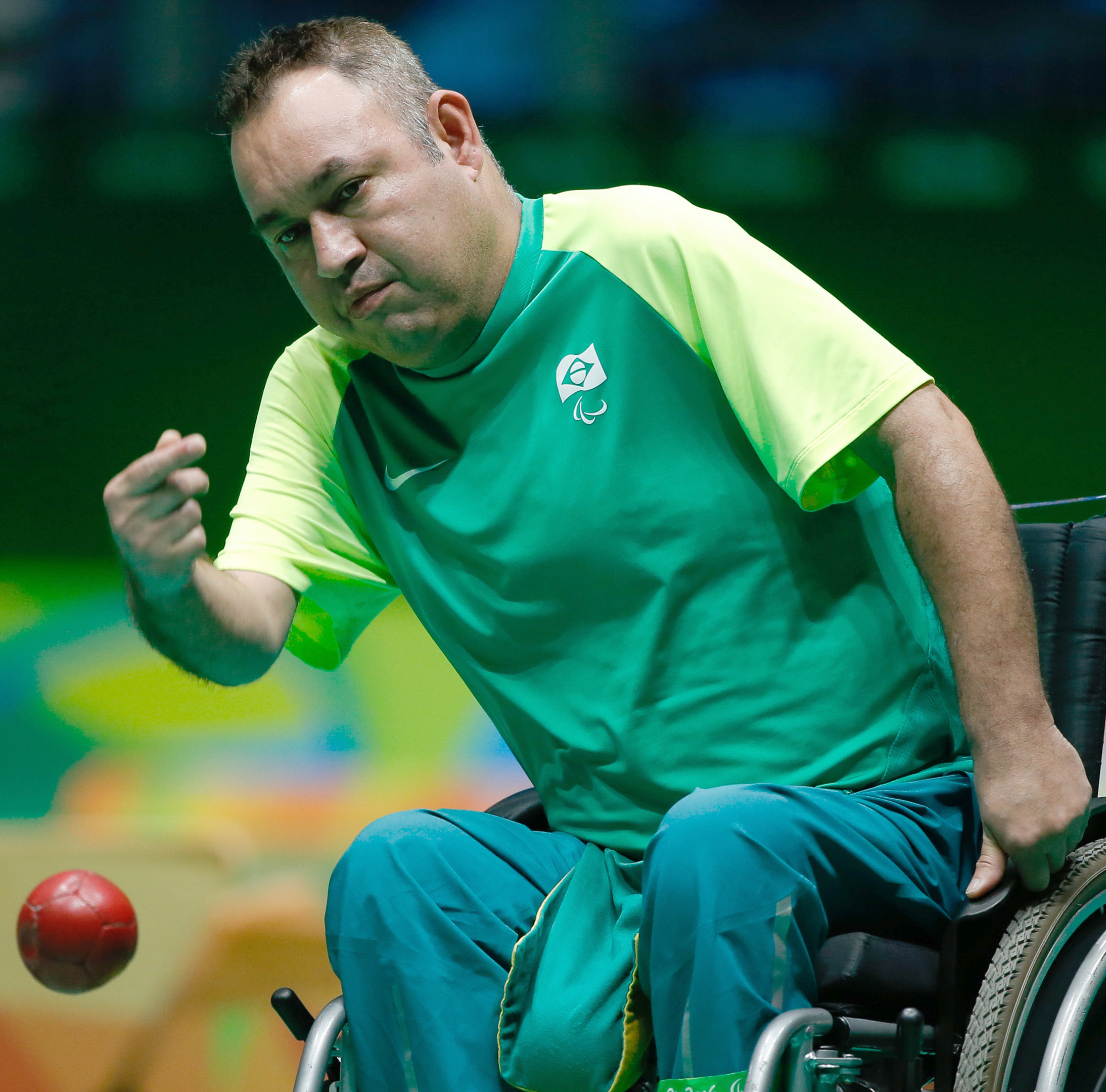
- Marcelo dos Santos at the 2016 Paralympics

Personal information
- Born: 10 September 1972 (age 53)

Sport
- Sport: Boccia
- Disability class: BC4
Medal record
Representing Brazil
Paralympic Games
Silver medal – second place	2016 Rio	Mixed pairs BC4
Parapan American Games
Gold medal – first place	2015 Toronto	Pairs BC4
Silver medal – second place	2019 Lima	Pairs BC4
Bronze medal – third place	2015 Toronto	Individual BC4

Marcelo dos Santos (born 10 September 1972 in Telêmaco Borba) is a Paralympic boccia player from Brazil who competes in the BC4 category. He took up the sport at the 2016 Paralympics he won individual bronze medals and shared gold medals in pairs with Dirceu Pinto and Eliseu dos Santos.
