= Vivian Lau Wai-yan =

Hong Kong boccia player (born 1979)

Personal information
- Born: 5 February 1979 (age 47) Hong Kong

Sport
- Sport: Boccia
- Disability class: BC4
Medal record
Boccia
Representing Hong Kong
Paralympic Games
Silver medal – second place	2020 Tokyo	Pairs BC4
World Championships
Gold medal – first place	2014 Beijing	Pairs BC4
Bronze medal – third place	2006 Rio de Janeiro	Pairs BC4
Bronze medal – third place	2010 Lisbon	Pairs BC4
Bronze medal – third place	2018 Liverpool	Pairs BC4
Asian Para Games
Gold medal – first place	2014 Incheon	Pairs BC4
Silver medal – second place	2014 Incheon	Individual BC4

Vivian Lau Wai-yan (Chinese: 劉慧茵; born 5 February 1979) is a Hong Kong boccia player.

At the 2020 Summer Paralympics, she won the silver medal in the pairs event alongside Leung Yuk Wing and Wong Kwan Hang.
