= José Carlos Chagas de Oliveira =

Brazilian paralympic boccia player

José Carlos Chagas
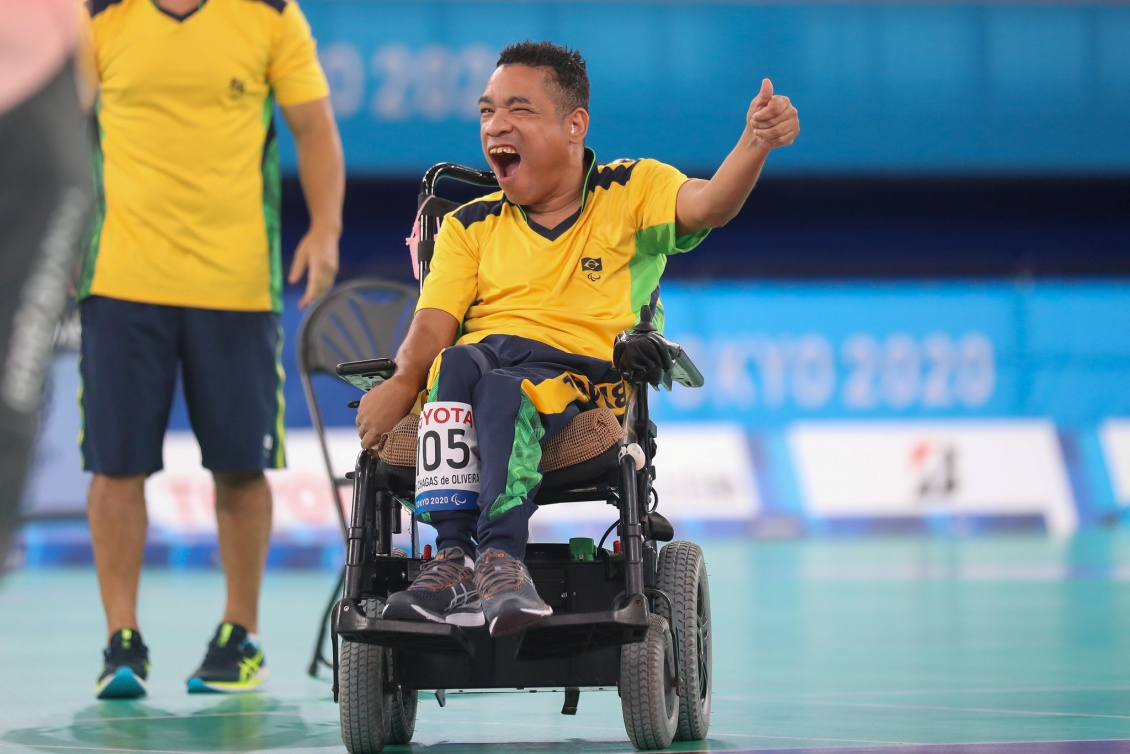
- Chagas de Oliveira at the 2020 Summer Paralympics

Personal information
- Full name: José Carlos Chagas de Oliveira
- Born: 4 August 1977 (age 48) Ribeirão Preto, Brazil

Sport
- Country: Brazil
- Sport: Boccia
- Disability: Cerebral palsy
- Disability class: BC1
Medal record
Boccia
Representing Brazil
Paralympic Games
Bronze medal – third place	2020 Tokyo	Mixed individual BC1
Parapan American Games
Bronze medal – third place	2023 Santiago	Men's individual BC1

José Carlos Chagas de Oliveira (born 4 August 1977) is a Brazilian paralympic boccia player. He participated at the 2020 Summer Paralympics in the boccia competition, being awarded the bronze medal in the mixed individual BC1 event. He also competed at the 2012 and 2016 Summer Paralympics in the boccia competition.
