= World Boccia =

International sports governing body

- Formation: 2012
- Type: Sport federation
- Location: London, UK
- Secretary General: Sandy Hermiston
- President: David Hadfield
- Website: www.worldboccia.com

The World Boccia (formerly Boccia International Sports Federation (BISFed)) is the international governing body for the sport of boccia. World Boccia is the brand used by BISFed at competitions to reflect growing importance of the sport.

It formally assumed governance of the sport on 1 January 2013 from the Cerebral Palsy International Sports and Recreation Association (CPISRA).
