= Leidy Chica =

Colombian boccia player (born 1990)

Personal information
- Born: 8 June 1990 (age 36)

Sport
- Country: Colombia
- Sport: Boccia
- Disability class: BC4
Medal record
Women's boccia
Representing Colombia
Paralympic Games
Gold medal – first place	2024 Paris	Pairs BC4
Bronze medal – third place	2024 Paris	Individual BC4
Parapan American Games
Gold medal – first place	2019 Lima	Pairs BC4
Silver medal – second place	2023 Santiago	Individual BC4
Silver medal – second place	2023 Santiago	Pairs BC4
South American Para Games
Gold medal – first place	2026 Valledupar	Individual BC4
Gold medal – first place	2026 Valledupar	Pairs BC4

Leidy Chica (born 8 June 1990) is a Colombian boccia player. She competed at the 2024 Summer Paralympics and won a bronze medal.

She is the sister of Edilson Chica, who also won a medal in boccia at the 2024 Paralympics.
