= Carla Oliveira =

Portuguese boccia player

Personal information
- Born: 20 December 1988 (age 37) Lourosa, Portugal

Sport
- Sport: Boccia
- Disability: Muscular dystrophy
Medal record
Representing Portugal
World Championships
Gold medal – first place	2015 Beijing	Individual BC4
European Para Championships
Gold medal – first place	2023 Rotterdam	Individual BC4
Bronze medal – third place	2023 Rotterdam	Pairs BC4

Carla Oliveira (born 20 December 1988) is a boccia player who competes internationally for Portugal. She is a European Para champion and has competed at the 2016, 2020 and 2024 Summer Paralympics.
