= Dirceu Pinto =

Brazilian Paralympic boccia player (1980–2020)

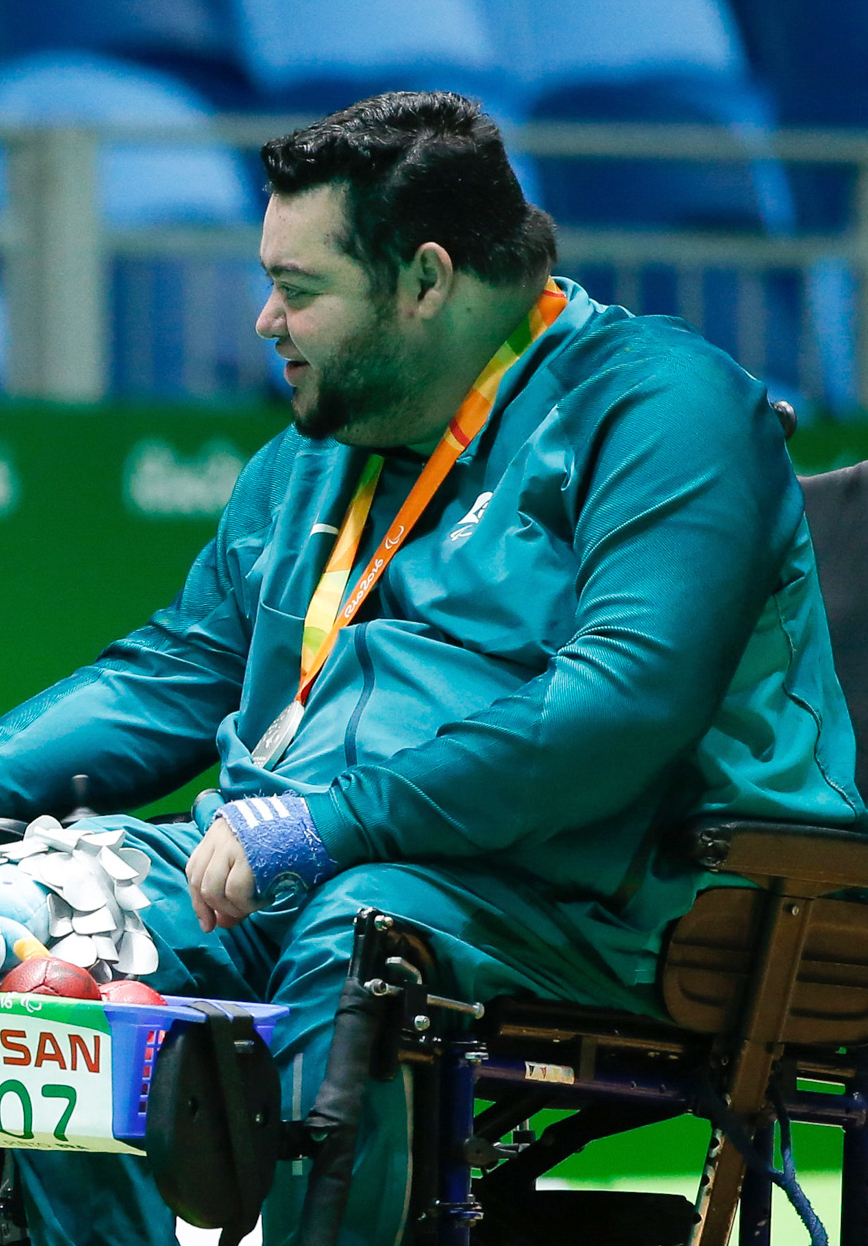
- Pinto at the 2016 Paralympics

Personal information
- Born: 10 September 1980 Mogi das Cruzes, Brazil
- Died: 1 April 2020 (aged 39) Mogi das Cruzes, Brazil
- Height: 180 cm (5 ft 11 in)
- Weight: 100 kg (220 lb)

Sport
- Country: Brazil
- Sport: Boccia
Medal record
Representing Brazil
Paralympic Games
Gold medal – first place	2008 Beijing	Individual BC4
Gold medal – first place	2008 Beijing	Pairs BC4
Gold medal – first place	2012 London	Individual BC4
Gold medal – first place	2012 London	Pairs BC4
Silver medal – second place	2016 Rio de Janeiro	Pairs BC4
Parapan American Games
Gold medal – first place	2015 Toronto	Pairs BC4
Silver medal – second place	2019 Lima	Pairs BC4

Dirceu José Pinto (10 September 1980 – 1 April 2020) was a Brazilian Paralympic boccia player with muscular dystrophy. He won individual and pairs gold medals at the 2008 and 2012 Paralympics in the BC4 category. At the 2016 Olympics he placed second in the mixed pairs.

He died from a congestive cardiac failure on April 1, 2020, at the age of 39.
