= Ariake Gymnastics Centre =

Exhibition hall in Tokyo, Japan

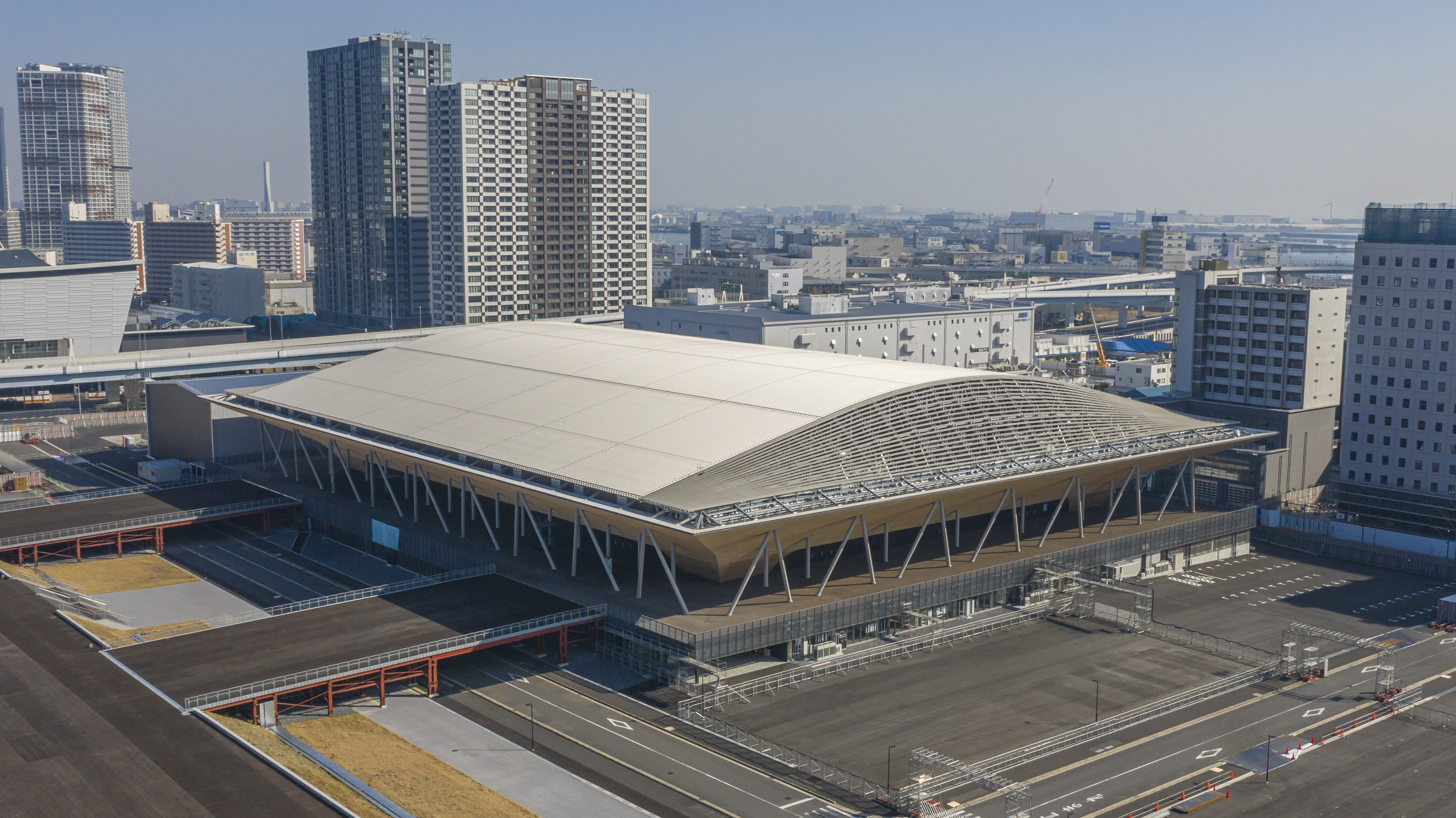
- Interactive map of Ariake Gymnastics Centre
- Address: 1 Chome-8 Ariake Kōtō-ku, Tōkyō-to 135-0063; Tokyo; Japan
- Coordinates: 35.6414°N 139.7917°E
- Capacity: 12,000

Construction
- Built: 2019
- Opened: 29 October 2019
- Cost: ¥ 20.5 billion

Website
- Tokyo 2020 website

The Ariake GYM-EX, formerly known as the Ariake Gymnastics Centre, is an exhibition hall and former sports arena in the Ariake district of Tokyo, Japan. Opened in October 2019, the venue was originally constructed to host the gymnastics events at the 2020 Summer Olympics and the boccia events at the 2020 Summer Paralympics.

Following the Olympics, the venue was redeveloped by the Tokyo Metropolitan Government into an exhibition hall, renamed the Ariake GYM-EX, with the intention of promoting smaller Tokyo-area businesses. In 2023, the Tokyo Big Sight began managing the facility.
