= Eliseu dos Santos =

Paralympic boccia player

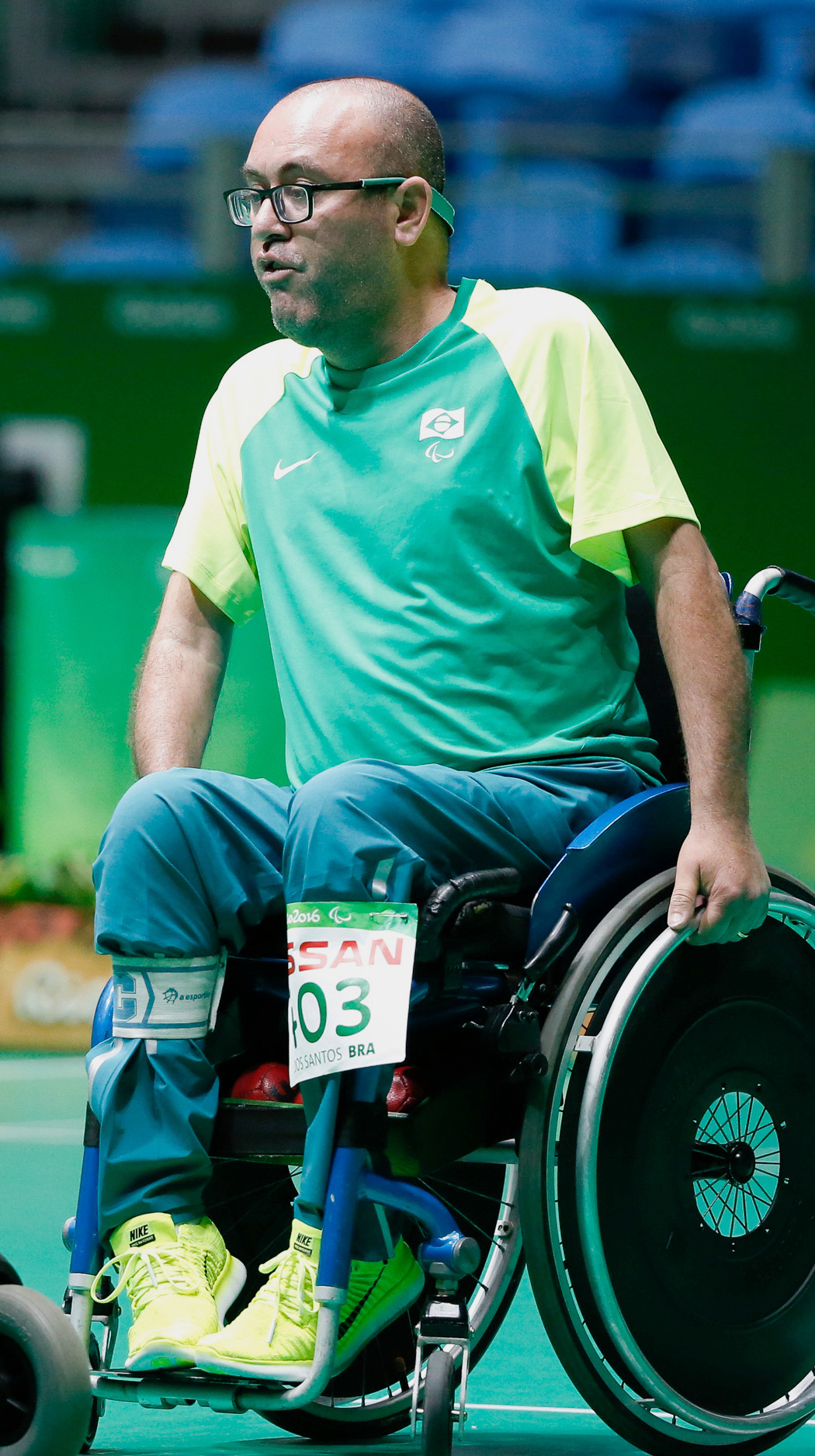
- Eliseu dos Santos at the 2016 Paralympics

Personal information
- Born: 15 November 1976 (age 49) Telêmaco Borba

Sport
- Sport: Boccia
- Disability class: BC4
Medal record
Representing Brazil
Paralympic Games
Gold medal – first place	2008 Beijing	Pairs BC4
Gold medal – first place	2012 London	Pairs BC4
Silver medal – second place	2016 Rio	Mixed pairs BC4
Bronze medal – third place	2008 Beijing	Individual BC4
Bronze medal – third place	2012 London	Individual BC4
Parapan American Games
Gold medal – first place	2015 Toronto	Pairs BC4
Gold medal – first place	2015 Toronto	Individual BC4
Silver medal – second place	2019 Lima	Pairs BC4

Eliseu dos Santos (born 15 November 1976) is a Paralympic boccia player of Brazil who competes in the BC4 category. He took up the sport in 2005. At the 2008 and 2012 Paralympics he won individual bronze medals and shared gold medals in pairs with Dirceu Pinto. At the 2016 Paralympics he won a silver medal in the mixed pairs.
