= Pornchok Larpyen =

Thai Paralympic boccia player

Personal information
- Born: 2 April 1994 (age 32) Buriram, Thailand

Sport
- Sport: Boccia
- Disability class: BC4
Medal record
Men's boccia
Representing Thailand
Paralympic Games
Silver medal – second place	2020 Tokyo	Individual BC4
Bronze medal – third place	2016 Rio de Janeiro	Individual BC4
Bronze medal – third place	2016 Rio de Janeiro	Pairs BC4
Bronze medal – third place	2024 Paris	Pairs BC4
Asian Para Games
Gold medal – first place	2022 Hangzhou	Individual BC4
Bronze medal – third place	2018 Jakarta	Pairs BC4
Bronze medal – third place	2022 Hangzhou	Pairs BC4

Pornchok Larpyen (Thai: พรโชค ลาภเย็น; born 2 April 1994) is a Thai boccia player who represented Thailand at the 2016 and 2020 Summer Paralympics.

== Career ==
He won two bronze medals at the 2016 Summer Paralympics, one in the Pairs BC4 event and another in the Individual BC4 event. He won a silver medal at the 2020 Summer Paralympics in the individual BC4 event.
