= Samuel Andrejčík =

Slovak Paralympic boccia player

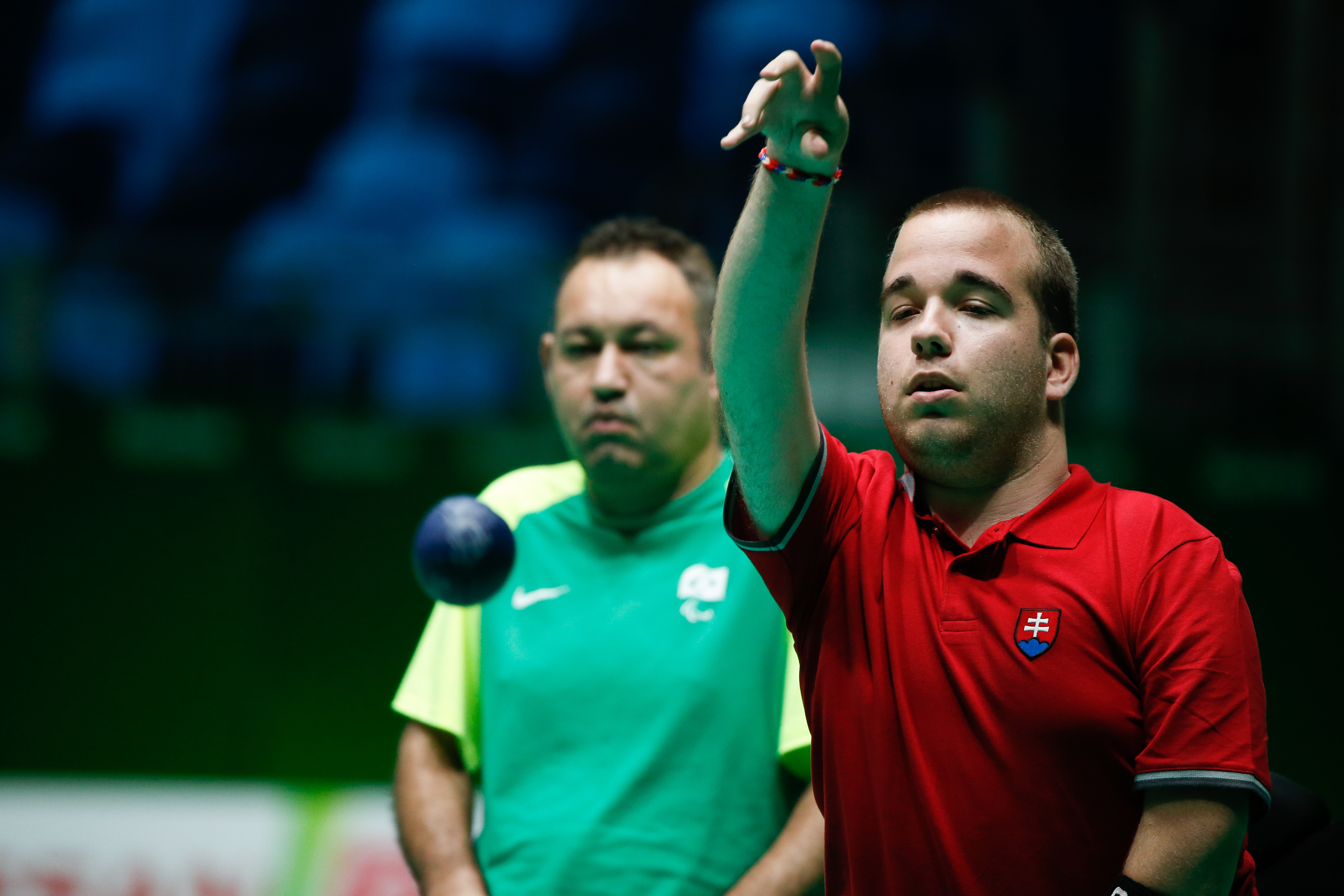
- Andrejčík at the 2016 Paralympics

Personal information
- Born: 10 September 1996 (age 29) Prešov, Slovakia

Sport
- Sport: Boccia
- Disability class: BC4
Medal record
Representing Slovakia
Paralympic Games
Gold medal – first place	2016 Rio de Janeiro	Mixed pairs BC4
Gold medal – first place	2020 Tokyo	Individual BC4
Gold medal – first place	2020 Tokyo	Mixed pairs BC4
Silver medal – second place	2016 Rio de Janeiro	Individual BC4

Samuel Andrejčík (born 10 September 1996) is a Slovak Paralympic boccia player who competes in the BC4 category. In the 2016 Summer Paralympics he won the gold medal in pairs with Róbert Ďurkovič and Michaela Balcová and silver medal in individual BC4. He lives in Snina.
