= Marco Dispaltro =

Canadian boccia player

Personal information
- Nickname: The Dragon Slayer
- Born: August 2, 1967 (age 58) Montreal, Quebec, Canada
- Home town: Saint-Jérôme, Quebec, Canada

Sport
- Country: Canada
- Sport: Boccia
- Disability: Muscular dystrophy
- Disability class: BC4
Medal record
Boccia
Representing Canada
Paralympic Games
Bronze medal – third place	2012 London	Pairs BC4
Parapan American Games
Gold medal – first place	2019 Lima	Individual BC4
Silver medal – second place	2011 Guadalajara	Individual BC4
Silver medal – second place	2015 Toronto	Pairs BC4
Bronze medal – third place	2019 Lima	Pairs BC4

Marco Dispaltro (born August 2, 1967) is a Canadian boccia player who competes at international elite competitions. He is a Paralympic bronze medalist in the pairs with Josh Vander Vies and a Parapan American Games champion in the individual events.
