= Michaela Balcová =

Slovak Paralympic boccia player

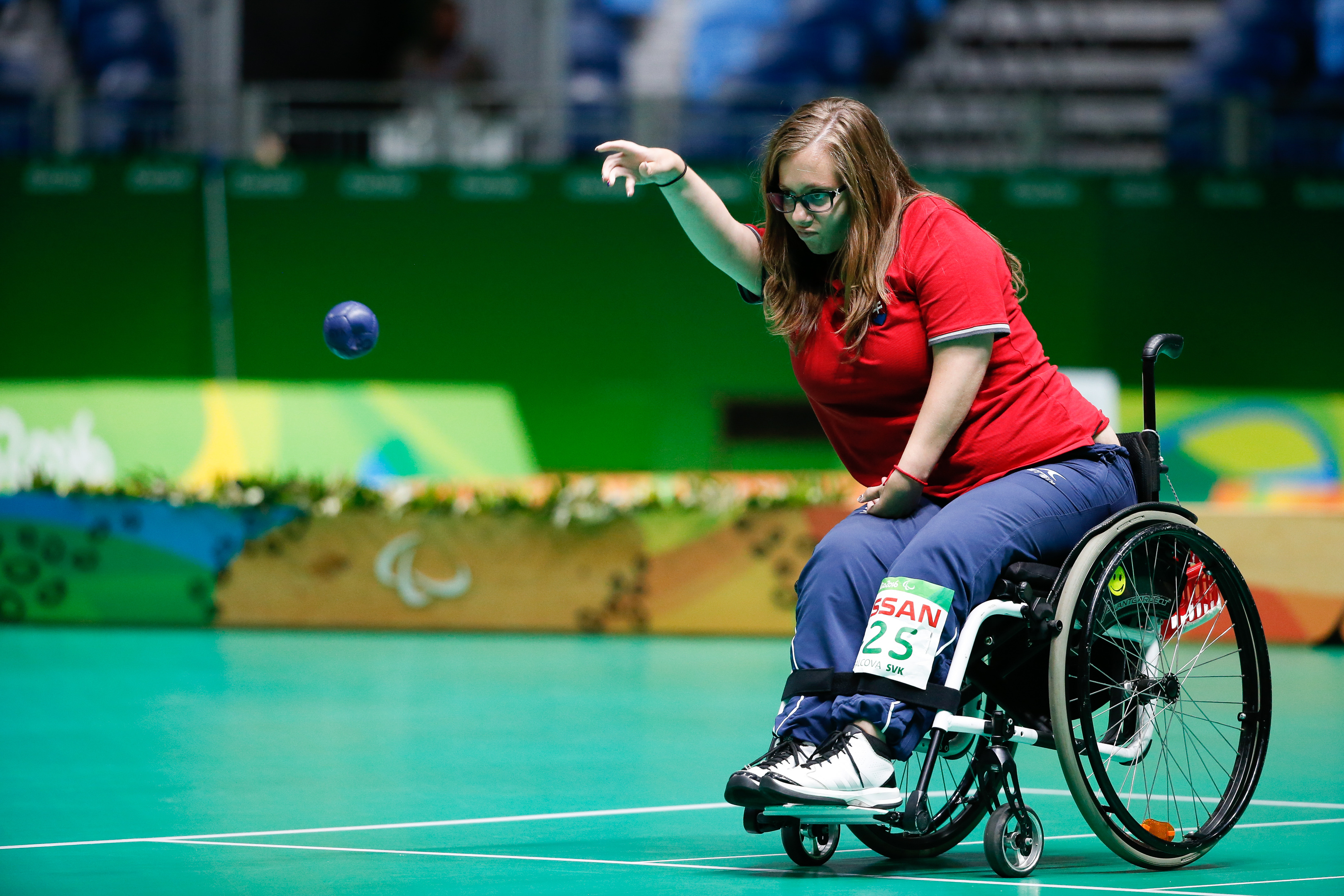
- Balcová at the 2016 Paralympics

Personal information
- Born: 30 May 1995 (age 31) Poprad, Slovakia

Sport
- Sport: Boccia
- Disability class: BC4
Medal record
Representing Slovakia
Paralympic Games
Gold medal – first place	2016 Rio de Janeiro	Mixed pairs BC4
Gold medal – first place	2020 Tokyo	Mixed pairs BC4
World Championships
Gold medal – first place	Liverpool 2018	Mixed pairs BC4
Gold medal – first place	Rio de Janeiro 2022	Individual BC4
Silver medal – second place	Rio de Janeiro 2022	Mixed pairs BC4
European Championships
Gold medal – first place	Guildford 2015	Mixed pairs BC4
Gold medal – first place	Sevilla 2019	Mixed pairs BC4
Bronze medal – third place	Sevilla 2019	Individual BC4
Gold medal – first place	Sevilla 2021	Mixed pairs BC4
Silver medal – second place	Sevilla 2021	Individual BC4

Michaela Balcová (born 30 May 1995) is a Slovak Paralympic boccia player who competes in the BC4 category. In the 2016 Summer Paralympics she won the gold medal in mixed pairs with Robert Durkovic and Samuel Andrejčík. Balcová and Andrejčík also won the gold medal at the 2020 Summer Paralympics alongside Martin Streharsky.
