= Leung Yuk Wing =

Hong Kong Paralympic boccia player

Personal information
- Born: 13 December 1984 (age 41) British Hong Kong

Sport
- Sport: Boccia
- Disability class: BC4
Medal record
Men's boccia
Representing Hong Kong
Paralympic Games
Gold medal – first place	2004 Athens	Individual BC4
Gold medal – first place	2004 Athens	Pairs BC4
Gold medal – first place	2016 Rio de Janeiro	Individual BC4
Silver medal – second place	2008 Beijing	Individual BC4
Silver medal – second place	2020 Tokyo	Pairs BC4
Silver medal – second place	2024 Paris	Pairs BC4
Bronze medal – third place	2020 Tokyo	Individual BC4
Asian Para Games
Gold medal – first place	2014 Incheon	Individual BC4
Gold medal – first place	2014 Incheon	Pairs BC4
Silver medal – second place	2022 Hangzhou	Pairs BC4
Bronze medal – third place	2010 Guangzhou	Individual BC4
Bronze medal – third place	2022 Hangzhou	Individual BC4

Leung Yuk-wing (Chinese: 梁育榮; born 13 December 1984) is a Hong Kong boccia player. He first competed for Hong Kong at the Summer Paralympics in 2004. As of the 2020 Summer Paralympics in Tokyo, Leung has three gold medals, two silver medals, and one bronze medal.

== Career ==
Leung won two gold medals at the 2004 Summer Paralympics in Athens. He won a silver medal four years later at the 2008 Summer Paralympics in Beijing. He also competed at the 2012 Summer Paralympics in London. At the 2016 Summer Paralympics in Rio de Janeiro, he won a gold medal. At the 2020 Summer Paralympics, he won a bronze medal in the individual event and a silver medal in the pairs event.
