= Stephen McGuire =

Scottish Boccia player (born 1984)

Medal record

Men's boccia

Representing Great Britain

Paralympic Games
| Gold medal – first place | 2024 Paris | Individual BC4 |

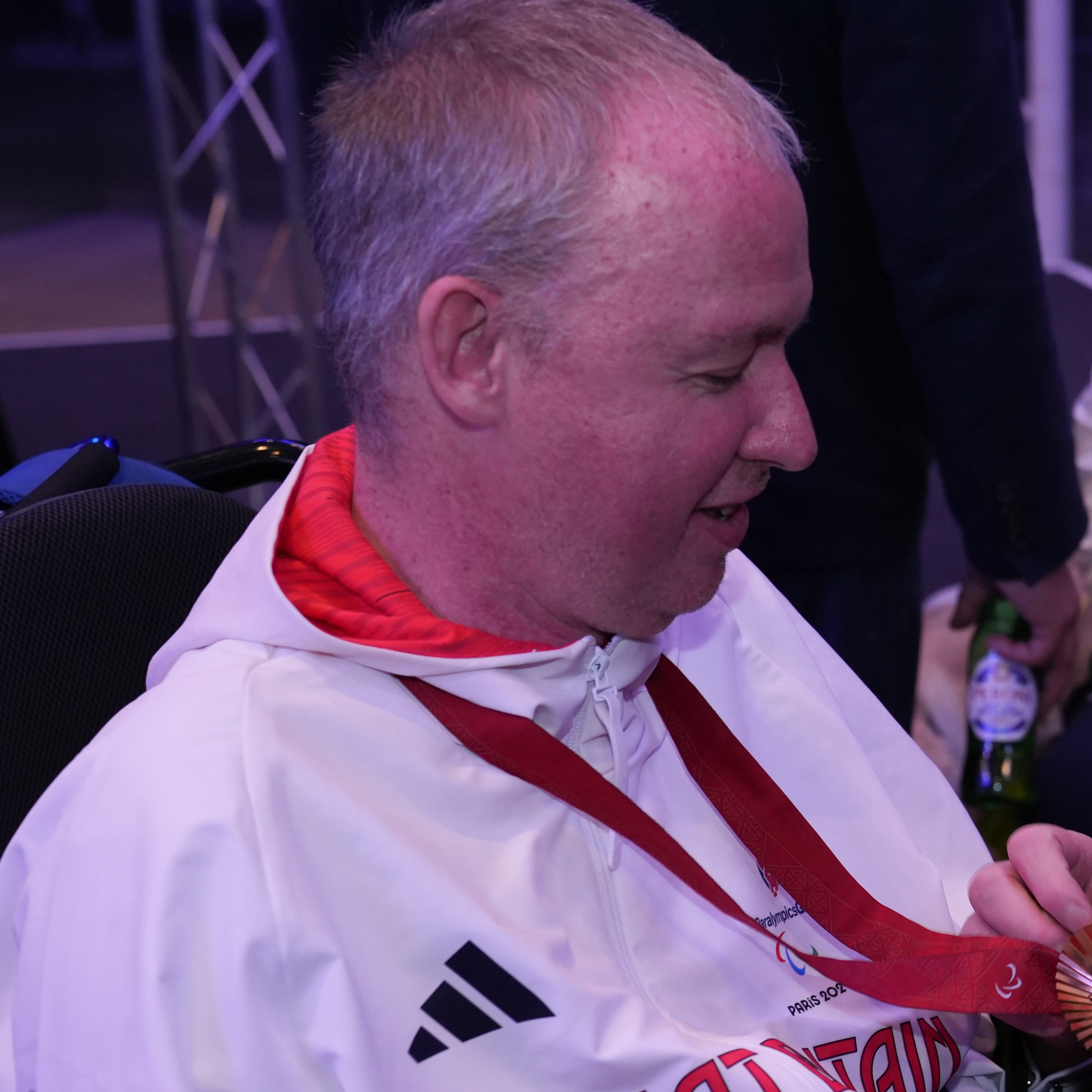
McGuire in 2024

Stephen William McGuire MBE (born 18 August 1984) is a Scottish Boccia player from Bellshill, Scotland.

== Personal life ==
McGuire was born on 18 August 1984, in Bellshill to a Scottish father and mother. He was born with muscular dystrophy, a degenerative condition that means he requires the use of a wheelchair.

McGuire is known to work in the community, helping with disabled young people and is an ambassador for the Muscular Dystrophy Campaign. He has recently attended his fourth Paralympic Games in Paris, where he won gold in the BC4 individual category.

== Boccia ==
He competes in the BC4 classification. In pairs events, he was most successful with his brother Peter who also has muscular dystrophy.

McGuire is the most successful British BC4 Boccia athlete; a ten-time Scottish Champion, thirteen-time British Champion, four-time European Champion, and former World Champion. In his early career and competing with his elder brother Peter he won the gold medal in the BC4 pairs event at the 2009 European Championships held in Porto, Portugal. In 2010, they won the silver medal at the World Championships in Lisbon, Portugal. Other major championship medals include European Silver from Hamar, Norway 2011 as well as retaining European Gold in the Pairs event in 2013, multiple World Open medals in Povoa Portugal, Montreal Canada and reaching the pinnacle of his career by securing the World Championship Individual Gold medal in Beijing 2016.

In 2012 both Stephen and Peter were selected as part of the Boccia squad for Great Britain at the 2012 Summer Paralympics. In the lead up to the games they participated in a documentary detailing their journey through life and into sport., marking his first games. Subsequently, competing in Rio de Janeiro and Tokyo.
