= Zheng Yuansen =

Chinese boccia player (born 1989)

Personal information
- Born: 17 July 1989 (age 36) Guangzhou, China

Sport
- Sport: Boccia
- Disability class: BC4
Medal record
Representing China
Paralympic Games
Silver medal – second place	2012 London	Individual BC4
Asian Para Games
Gold medal – first place	2010 Guangzhou	Individual BC4
Silver medal – second place	2022 Hangzhou	Men's individual BC4

Zheng Yuansen (Chinese: 郑远森; pinyin: Zhèng Yuǎnsēn; born 17 July 1989) is a Chinese boccia player who began playing the sport in 2008.

== Career ==
He won a gold medal in Boccia at the 2010 Asian Para Games. He is assured a medal at the 2012 Summer Paralympics after defeating Stephen McGuire 12–0. McGuire complimented his playing, saying of Zheng "He has got so much power, he played really great. In the end I couldn't compete with his power and this was my toughest match of the competition."
