= BC4 =

Boccia classification

BC4 is a boccia classification.

== Definition ==
In 2008, BBC Sport defined this classification was "BC4: For players with other severe physical disabilities — not necessarily cerebral palsy. Players are not eligible for assistance " In 2008, the Australian Broadcasting Corporation defined this classification was "BC4: This category applies to people with other severe disabilities not covered by the three other categories. Players are not allowed assistance." In 2012, the Cerebral Palsy International Sports and Recreation Association defined this classification as: "BC 4 – These athletes have a severe physical disability who have a diagnosis other than CP. They often lack strength, have poor timing and release of the ball. Many BC4 athletes have progressive disabilities and use an underhand, pendulum swing to release the ball." In 2012, the Great Britain Boccia Federation defined this classification as: "Players who do not have Cerebral Palsy but have another disability with locomotor dysfunction in all four limbs and have similar functional ability to BC2 athletes. Disabilities such as Muscular Dystrophy and Tetraplegia will fall under this classification."

== Events ==
Events this classification competes in are mixed gendered competitions for either single players or a pair of players. At the 2012 Summer Paralympics, this classification will compete in a six end individual event, and a pairs event with four balls per each end in a four end game. Players in this classification have five minutes to play an end. Players in this classification have six minutes to play an end during team play.

== Competitors ==
Competitors in this classification include Jamie Docherty who has represented both Scotland and Great Britain.

== Australian Performances ==
At the 2012 Australian national championships held at the Sydney Sport & Recreation from 30 April to 3 May, the BC3 individual event was won by Dean Nottle of New South Wales, with Adam Del Biondo of New South Wales taking second and Caleb Crowden of South Australia taking third.

== Becoming classified ==
Classification is handled by Cerebral Palsy International Sports and Recreation Association. The classification officer for the Cerebral Palsy International Sports and Recreation Association is Joan Steele-Mills.

== At the Paralympic Games ==
For the 2016 Summer Paralympics in Rio, the International Paralympic Committee had a zero classification at the Games policy. This policy was put into place in 2014, with the goal of avoiding last minute changes in classes that would negatively impact athlete training preparations. All competitors needed to be internationally classified with their classification status confirmed prior to the Games, with exceptions to this policy being dealt with on a case-by-case basis. In case there was a need for classification or reclassification at the Games despite best efforts otherwise, boccia classification was scheduled for September 8 at Carioca Arena 2.

== See also ==
- Boccia classification
