= Hong Kong at the 2024 Summer Paralympics =

- IPC code: HKG
- NPC: China Hong Kong Paralympic Committee
- Website: www.paralympic.hk

in Paris, France August 28, 2024 – September 8, 2024
- Competitors: 23 in 8 sports
- Flag bearers: Chan Ho Yuen; Wong Ting Ting
- Medals Ranked 32nd: Gold 3 Silver 4 Bronze 1 Total 8

Summer Paralympics appearances (overview)
- 1972; 1976; 1980; 1984; 1988; 1992; 1996; 2000; 2004; 2008; 2012; 2016; 2020; 2024

Hong Kong competed at the 2024 Summer Paralympics in Paris, France, from 28 August to 8 September. These were the first games contested by Hong Kong under the Hong Kong Paralympic Committee umbrella, following its split with Hong Kong Sports Association for the Physically Disabled on 1 April 2022.

== Medalists ==
Medal	Name	Sport	Event	Date
(gold) Gold	John Loung	Boccia	Men's Individual BC1	2 September
(gold) Gold	Ho Yuen Kei	Boccia	Women's Individual BC3	2 September
(gold) Gold	Tse Tak Wah; Ho Yuen Kei	Boccia	Mixed Pairs BC3	5 September
(silver) Silver	Chan Yui-lam	Para Swimming	Women's 100m Butterfly - S14	30 August
(silver) Silver	Cheung Yuen	Boccia	Women's Individual BC4	2 September
(silver) Silver	Chan Ho Yuen	Badminton	Men's singles WH2	2 September
(silver) Silver	Leung Yuk Wing; Cheung Yuen	Boccia	Mixed Pairs BC4	5 September
(bronze) Bronze	Ng Cheuk Yan	Para Swimming	Women's 100 m breaststroke - SB6	1 September

Medals by sport
Sport	1st place, gold medalist(s)	2nd place, silver medalist(s)	3rd place, bronze medalist(s)	Total
Boccia	3	2	0	5
Swimming	0	1	1	2
Badminton	0	1	0	1
Total	3	4	1	8

Medals by day
Day	Date	1st place, gold medalist(s)	2nd place, silver medalist(s)	3rd place, bronze medalist(s)	Total
1	29 August	0	0	0	0
2	30 August	0	1	0	1
3	31 August	0	0	0	0
4	1 September	0	0	1	1
5	2 September	2	2	0	4
6	3 September	0	0	0	0
7	4 September	0	0	0	0
8	5 September	1	1	0	2
9	6 September	0	0	0	0
10	7 September	0	0	0	0
11	8 September	0	0	0	0
Total		3	4	1	8

Medals by gender
Gender	1st place, gold medalist(s)	2nd place, silver medalist(s)	3rd place, bronze medalist(s)	Total	Percentage
Female	1	2	1	4	50.0%
Male	1	1	0	2	25.0%
Mixed	1	1	0	2	25.0%
Total	3	4	1	8	100%

== Competitors ==
The following is the list of number of competitors in the Games.

Sport	Men	Women	Total
Archery	1	0	1
Athletics	0	1	1
Badminton	2	0	2
Boccia	3	3	6
Equestrian	0	1	1
Swimming	2	3	5
Table tennis	1	2	3
Wheelchair fencing	0	4	4
Total	9	14	23

== Archery ==
Hong Kong has entered one archer at Men's Individual Compound Open

Athlete	Event	Ranking round		Round of 32	Round of 16	Quarterfinals	Semifinals	Finals	
Athlete	Event	Score	Seed	Opposition score	Opposition score	Opposition score	Opposition score	Opposition score	Rank
Ngai Ka Chuen	Men's individual compound	670	30	Forsberg (FIN); L 137-142	Did not advance				

== Athletics ==
Key

- Note–Ranks given for track events are within the athlete's heat only
- Q = Qualified for the next round
- q = Qualified for the next round as a fastest loser or, in field events, by position without achieving the qualifying target
- DQ = Disqualified
- PR = Paralympic Record
- AR = Area (or continental) Record
- NR = National Record
- SB = Season's Best
- N/A = Round not applicable for the event
- Bye = Athlete not required to compete in round

Track & road events
Women

Athlete	Event	Heat		Final	
Athlete	Event	Result	Rank	Result	Rank
Yam Kwok Fan	100 metres T36	15.62	11	Did not advance	
Yam Kwok Fan	200 metres T36	33.16	10	Did not advance	

== Badminton ==
Hong Kong has qualified two para badminton players for the following events, through the release of BWF para-badminton Race to Paris Paralympic Ranking.

Athlete	Event	Group Stage				Semifinal	Final / BM	
Athlete	Event	Opposition Score	Opposition Score	Opposition Score	Rank	Opposition Score	Opposition Score	Rank
Chan Ho Yuen	Men's singles WH2	Aránguiz (CHI); W (21–10, 21–8)	Noorlan (MAS); W (21–11, 21–11)	—	1 Q	Yu S-y (KOR); W (23–21, 21–10)	Daiki Kajiwara (JPN); L (10–21, 10–21)	2nd place, silver medalist(s)
Chu Man Kai	Men's singles SH6	Coombs (GBR); W (21-13, 19-21, 21-15)	Solaimalai (IND); W (21–13, 18–21, 21–15)	Subhan (INA); W (21-13, 21-13)	1 Q	Coombs (GBR); L (19-21, 14-21)	Vitor Tavares (BRA); L (21-23, 21-12, 14-21)	4

== Boccia ==
Hong Kong entered six athletes into the Paralympics games, after nominated top four pairs, each in mixed BC4 and BC3 events; and nominated top two in the individual category of men's BC1 and women's BC2, through the final world ranking.

Men

Athlete	Event	Pool matches				Quarterfinals	Semifinals	Final / BM	
Athlete	Event	Opposition Score	Opposition Score	Opposition Score	Rank	Opposition Score	Opposition Score	Opposition Score	Rank
John Loung	Individual BC1	Cryderman (CAN); W 5–1	Ramos (POR); L 6–7	—	2 Q	Huadpradit (THA); W 5–3	Syafa (INA); W 4–3	Jung S-j (KOR); W 4–1	1st place, gold medalist(s)
Tse Tak Wah	Individual BC3	Iskrzycki (POL); L 4–6	Peska (CZE); L 3–4	Romero (ARG); W 6–3	3	Did not advance			10
Leung Yuk Wing	Individual BC4	Costa (BRA); W 8–1	Zheng (CHN); L 2–3	Uchida (JPN); W 8–2	2 Q	McGuire (GBR); L 1–6	Did not advance		8

Women

Athlete	Event	Pool matches				Quarterfinals	Semifinals	Final / BM	
Athlete	Event	Opposition Score	Opposition Score	Opposition Score	Rank	Opposition Score	Opposition Score	Opposition Score	Rank
Yeung Hiu Lam	Individual BC2	Jankechová (SVK); W 8–0	Duarte (ESA); W 3*–3	—	1 Q	Taggart (GBR); L 2–3	Did not advance		7
Ho Yuen Kei	Individual BC3	Jordaan (RSA); W 8–0	Calado (BRA); W 5–4	Costa (POR); W 3–2	1 Q	Kla-Han (THA); W 3–2	Kang S-h (KOR); W 4–1	Leeson (AUS); W 4–2	1st place, gold medalist(s)
Cheung Yuen	Individual BC4	Lin (CHN); W 6–2	Vozarova (SVK); W 6–3	Phonsila (THA); W 5–2	1 Q	Teixeira (BRA); W 4–1	Mat Salim (MAS); W 7–0	Lin (CHN); L 1–5	2nd place, silver medalist(s)

Mixed

Athlete	Event	Pool matches			Quarterfinals	Semifinals	Final / BM	
Athlete	Event	Opposition Score	Opposition Score	Rank	Opposition Score	Opposition Score	Opposition Score	Rank
Tse Tak Wah; Ho Yuen Kei	Pairs BC3	Czech Republic; W 7–3	Argentina; W 3–2	1 Q	Brazil; W 3–1	Thailand; W 3–2	South Korea; W 5–3	1st place, gold medalist(s)
Leung Yuk Wing; Cheung Yuen	Pairs BC4	Egypt; W 8–1	Brazil; W 10–2	1 Q	Slovakia; W 10–2	Canada; W 6–4	Colombia; L 1–6	2nd place, silver medalist(s)

== Equestrian ==
Hong Kong entered one para-equestrian into the Paralympic equestrian competition, by virtue of the nations individual final world para dressage rankings.

Individual

Athlete	Horse	Event	Total	
Athlete	Horse	Event	Score	Rank
Pui Ting Natasha Tse	Juno's Whispering ANG	Individual championship test grade I	66.833	15
Pui Ting Natasha Tse	Juno's Whispering ANG	Individual freestyle test grade I	Did not advance	

== Swimming ==
Hong Kong qualified six swimmers (three men and three women) to compete at the games, by achieving the Minimum Qualification Standard (MQS) allocation slots.

Key

DNA = Did Not Advance

Men

Athlete	Events	Heats		Final	
Athlete	Events	Time	Rank	Time	Rank
Cheung Tsun Lok	200 m freestyle S14	1:57.87	5 Q	1:58.87	8
Tang Wai-lok	100 m backstroke S14	1:03.64	14	Did not advance	
Tang Wai-lok	200 m freestyle S14	1:58.98	8 Q	1:58.43	7
Tang Wai-lok	200 m individual medley SM14	2:17.58	11	Did not advance	

Women

Athlete	Events	Heats		Final	
Athlete	Events	Time	Rank	Time	Rank
Chan Yui-lam	200 m freestyle S14	2:17.55	11	Did not advance	
Chan Yui-lam	100 m backstroke S14	1:10.87	6 Q	1:11.78	8
Chan Yui-lam	100 m breaststroke SB14	1:20.47	7 Q	1:21.98	7
Chan Yui-lam	100 m butterfly S14	1:04.32	2 Q	1:03.70	2nd place, silver medalist(s)
Chan Yui-lam	200 m individual medley SM14	2:29.97	3 Q	2:29.33	5
Cheung Ho Ying	200 m freestyle S14	2:21.25	12	Did not advance	
Cheung Ho Ying	100 m breaststroke SB14	1:27.81	13	Did not advance	
Cheung Ho Ying	100 m butterfly S14	1:10.95	10	Did not advance	
Cheung Ho Ying	200 m individual medley SM14	2:36.66	9	Did not advance	
Ng Cheuk Yan	100 m backstroke S6	1:39.40	11	Did not advance	
Ng Cheuk Yan	100 m breaststroke SB6	—		1:34.15	3rd place, bronze medalist(s)
Ng Cheuk Yan	200 m individual medley SM6	3:12.95	5 Q	3:11.95	6

Mixed

Athlete	Events	Final	
Athlete	Events	Time	Rank
Cheung Tsun Lok; Tang Wai-lok; Chan Yui-lam; Cheung Ho Ying	4 × 100 m freestyle relay S14	3:55.26	4

== Table tennis ==
Hong Kong entered three athletes for the Paralympic games. Leung Chung Yan, Wong Ting Ting and Ng Mui Wui qualified for the games through the allocations of the final ITTF world ranking.

Athlete	Event	Round of 16	Quarterfinals	Semifinals	Final / BM	
Athlete	Event	Opposition Result	Opposition Result	Opposition Result	Opposition Result	Rank
Leung Chung Yan	Men's individual C11	P Palos (HUN); L 1–3	Did not advance			9
Wong Ting Ting	Women's individual C11	—	E Prokofeva (NPA); L 0–3	Did not advance		5
Ng Mui Wui	Women's individual C11	E Santos (BRA); L 0–3	Did not advance			9

== Wheelchair fencing ==
Individual

Athlete	Event	Round of 32	Round of 16	Quarterfinal	Semifinal	Repechage Round 1	Repechage Round 2	Repechage Round 3	Repechage Round 4	Final / BM	
Athlete	Event	Opposition Score	Opposition Score	Opposition Score	Opposition Score	Opposition Score	Opposition Score	Opposition Score	Opposition Score	Opposition Score	Rank
Fan Pui Shan	Épée A	C Delavoipiere (FRA); L 8–15	Did not advance								17
Fan Pui Shan	Foil A	—	J R Menéndez (ESP); L 10–15	—		V Isaacson (USA); W 15–3	Kwon H K (KOR); L 14–15	Did not advance			12
Fan Pui Shan	Sabre A	Kwon H K (KOR); L 8–15	Did not advance								17
Yu Chui Yee	Épée A	—	B Vide (FRA); L 13–15	—		J Taylor (USA); W 15–9	J R Menéndez (ESP); W 15–11	M Fidrych (POL); L 12–15	Did not advance		7
Yu Chui Yee	Foil A	—	J Taylor (USA); W 15–10	L Trigilia (ITA); W 15–8	Gu H-y (CHN); L 13–15	—			B Vide (FRA); W 15–14	J R Menéndez (ESP); L 11–15	4
Yu Chui Yee	Sabre A	—	M Fidrych (POL); W 15–13	N Tibilashvili (GEO); L 4–15	—		G Collis (GBR); L 9–15	Did not advance			9
Tong Nga Ting	Épée B	—	J Pacek (POL); W 15–8	Sakurai (JPN); W 15–12	S Jana (THA); L 7–15	—			T Lowthian (CAN); W 15–14	O Fedota (UKR); L 6–15	4
Tong Nga Ting	Foil B	—	F J Rojas (VEN); W 15–3	Xiao R (CHN)	—		Cho E H (KOR); L 9–15	Did not advance			9
Tong Nga Ting	Sabre B	—	J Pacek (POL); L 12–15	—		F J Rojas (VEN); W 15–6	Cho E H (KOR); L 5–15	Did not advance			11
Chung Yuen Ping	Épée B	—	Sakurai (JPN); L 3–15	—		J Pacek (POL); L 12–15	Did not advance				13
Chung Yuen Ping	Foil B	—	Cho E H (KOR); W 15–10	S Jana (THA); L 8–15	—		Kang S (CHN); L 9–15	Did not advance			11

Team

Athlete	Event	Round of 16	Quarterfinal	Semifinal	Final / BM	
Athlete	Event	Opposition Score	Opposition Score	Opposition Score	Opposition Score	Rank
Fan Pui Shan; Yu Chui Yee; Tong Nga Ting; Chung Yuen Ping	Team épée	United States; W 45–36	France; L 41-45	Did not advance		8
Fan Pui Shan; Yu Chui Yee; Tong Nga Ting; Chung Yuen Ping	Team foil	—	Ukraine; W 45–38	Hungary; L 29–45	Italy; L 33–45	4

== See also ==
- Hong Kong at the 2024 Summer Olympics
- Hong Kong at the Paralympics
