= Table tennis at the 2020 Summer Paralympics – Women's individual – Class 11 =

Table tennis at the XVI Paralympic Games
- Venue: Tokyo Metropolitan Gymnasium
- Dates: 25 – 28 August 2021
- Competitors: 8 from 6 nations

Medalists
1st place, gold medalist(s)		Elena Prokofeva	RPC
2nd place, silver medalist(s)		Léa Ferney	France
3rd place, bronze medalist(s)		Wong Ting Ting	Hong Kong
3rd place, bronze medalist(s)		Maki Ito	Japan

The Women's individual table tennis – Class 11 tournament at the 2020 Summer Paralympics in Tokyo took place between 25 and 28 August 2021 at Tokyo Metropolitan Gymnasium.

In the preliminary stage, athletes competed in three groups of four . The winners and runners-up of each group qualified for the knock-out stage. In this edition of the Games, no bronze medal match was held. The losers of each semifinal were automatically awarded a bronze medal.

== Results ==
All times are local time in UTC+9.

=== Main bracket ===
==== Final rounds ====
Semifinals
A1	Elena Prokofeva (RPC)	9	11	11	11
B2	Wong Ting Ting (HKG) (bronze)	11	5	6	8
A2	Maki Ito (JPN) (bronze)	8	6	10
B2	Léa Ferney (FRA)	11	11	12

Gold medal match
A1	Elena Prokofeva (RPC) (gold)	11	8	11	11
B2	Léa Ferney (FRA) (silver)	4	11	8	5

=== Preliminary round ===
Qualified for the knock-out stage

==== Group A ====
Seed	Athlete	Won	Lost	Points diff	Rank
1	Elena Prokofeva (RPC)	3	0	+43	1
5	Maki Ito (JPN)	1	2	–16	2
3	Ng Mui Wui (HKG)	1	2	–2	3
6	Krystyna Lysiak (POL)	1	2	–25	4

Krystyna Lysiak (POL)	5	6	6
Elena Prokofeva (RPC)	11	11	11

Ng Mui Wui (HKG)	14	11	8	11
Maki Ito (JPN)	12	9	11	3

Maki Ito (JPN)	11	11	11
Krystyna Lysiak (POL)	9	8	6

Ng Mui Wui (HKG)	9	7	7
Elena Prokofeva (RPC)	11	11	11

Elena Prokofeva (RPC)	11	11	11
Maki Ito (JPN)	5	3	8

Ng Mui Wui (HKG)	11	11	8	10	7
Krystyna Lysiak (POL)	7	7	11	12	11

==== Group B ====
Seed	Athlete	Won	Lost	Points diff	Rank
8	Léa Ferney (FRA)	2	1	+21	1
4	Wong Ting Ting (HKG)	2	1	+2	2
5	Kanami Furukawa (JPN)	2	1	–1	3
2	Natalya Kosmina (UKR)	0	3	–22	4

Furakawa Kunami (JPN)	11	11	3	11
Natalya Kosmina (UKR)	7	9	11	7

Wong Ting Ting (HKG)	12	3	11	12
Léa Ferney (FRA)	10	11	6	10

Léa Ferney (FRA)	11	12	14
Kanami Furukawa (JPN)	5	10	12

Wong Ting Ting (HKG)	11	11	8	11
Natalya Kosmina (UKR)	7	9	11	6

Natalya Kosmina (UKR)	9	2	11	8
Léa Ferney (FRA)	11	11	9	11

Wong Ting Ting (HKG)	8	8	11	8
Kanami Furukawa (JPN)	11	11	9	11
