= Poland at the 2016 Summer Paralympics =

- IPC code: POL
- NPC: Polish Paralympic Committee
- Website: www.paralympic.org.pl

in Rio de Janeiro
- Competitors: 90 in 13 sports
- Flag bearer: Rafał Wilk
- Medals Ranked 10th: Gold 9 Silver 18 Bronze 12 Total 39

Summer Paralympics appearances (overview)
- 1972; 1976; 1980; 1984; 1988; 1992; 1996; 2000; 2004; 2008; 2012; 2016; 2020; 2024

Poland competed at the 2016 Summer Paralympics in Rio de Janeiro, Brazil, from 7 to 18 September 2016.

== Medalists ==
Medal	Name	Sport	Event	Date
Gold	Ewa Durska	Athletics	Women's shot put F20	10 September
Gold	Maciej Lepiato	Athletics	Men's high jump T44	12 September
Gold	Maciej Sochal	Athletics	Men's club throw F31/32	13 September
Gold	Natalia Partyka	Table tennis	Women's individual – Class 10	13 September
Gold	Rafał Wilk	Cycling	Men's time trial H4	14 September
Gold	Jakub Tokarz	Paracanoeing	Men's KL1	15 September
Gold	Barbara Niewiedzial	Athletics	Women's 1500 m T20	16 September
Gold	Katarzyna Marszal; Natalia Partyka; Karolina Pęk	Table tennis	Women's team – Class 6–10	17 September
Gold	Iwona Podkościelna	Cycling	Women's road race B	17 September
Silver	Robert Jachimowicz	Athletics	Men's discus throw F52	8 September
Silver	Bartosz Tyszkowski	Athletics	Men's shot put F41	8 September
Silver	Wojciech Makowski	Swimming	Men's 100 metre backstroke S11	9 September
Silver	Michał Derus	Athletics	Men's 100 m T45/46/47	11 September
Silver	Krystyna Siemieniecka	Table tennis	Women's individual – Class 11	11 September
Silver	Alicja Fiodorow	Athletics	Women's 100 metres T47	11 September
Silver	Patryk Chojnowski	Table tennis	Men's individual – Class 10	12 September
Silver	Daniel Pek	Athletics	Men's 1500 m T20	13 September
Silver	Rafał Czuper	Table tennis	Men's individual – Class 2	13 September
Silver	Anna Harkowska	Cycling	Women's time trial C5	14 September
Silver	Marzena Zięba	Powerlifting	Women's +86 kg	14 September
Silver	Lucyna Kornobys	Athletics	Women's shot put F34	14 September
Silver	Karolina Kucharczyk	Athletics	Women's long jump T20	15 September
Silver	Rafał Wilk	Cycling	Men's road race H4	15 September
Silver	Alicja Fiodorow	Athletics	Women's 200 metres T47	16 September
Silver	Jacek Gaworski; Michał Nalewajek; Dariusz Pender	Wheelchair fencing	Men's team foil	16 September
Silver	Anna Harkowska	Cycling	Women's road race C4-5	17 September
Silver	Janusz Rokicki	Athletics	Men's shot put F57	17 September
Bronze	Anna Trener-Wierciak	Athletics	Women's long jump T38	11 September
Bronze	Adrian Castro	Wheelchair fencing	Men's individual sabre B	12 September
Bronze	Oliwia Jabłońska	Swimming	Women's 100 metre butterfly S9	12 September
Bronze	Piotr Grudzień	Table tennis	Men's individual – Class 8	13 September
Bronze	Katarzyna Piekart	Athletics	Women's javelin throw F45/46	13 September
Bronze	Karolina Pęk	Table tennis	Women's individual – Class 9	13 September
Bronze	Barbara Niewiedzial	Athletics	Women's 400 m T20	13 September
Bronze	Kamila Kubas	Paracanoeing	Women's KL1	15 September
Bronze	Michał Nalewajek; Dariusz Pender; Kamil Rząsa	Wheelchair fencing	Men's team épée	15 September
Bronze	Milena Olszewska	Archery	Women's individual recurve open	15 September
Bronze	Lech Stoltman	Athletics	Men's shot put F55	16 September

== Disability classifications ==
Every participant at the Paralympics has their disability grouped into one of five disability categories; amputation, the condition may be congenital or sustained through injury or illness; cerebral palsy; wheelchair athletes, there is often overlap between this and other categories; visual impairment, including blindness; Les autres, any physical disability that does not fall strictly under one of the other categories, for example dwarfism or multiple sclerosis. Each Paralympic sport then has its own classifications, dependent upon the specific physical demands of competition. Events are given a code, made of numbers and letters, describing the type of event and classification of the athletes competing. Some sports, such as athletics, divide athletes by both the category and severity of their disabilities, other sports, for example swimming, group competitors from different categories together, the only separation being based on the severity of the disability.

== Archery ==
Poland qualified two archers for the Rio Games following their performance at the 2015 World Archery Para Championships, both in the recurve open with one spot for a man and one for a woman. Milena Olszewska earned the first spot. She came into the competition as the 2014 European Para Archery Championship the silver medallist. Piotr Sawicki earned Poland's second spot after defeating Japan’s Takahiro Hasegawa.

Men

Athlete	Event	Ranking round		Round of 32	Round of 16	Quarterfinals	Semifinals	Final / BM	
Athlete	Event	Score	Seed	Opposition Score	Opposition Score	Opposition Score	Opposition Score	Opposition Score	Rank
Adam Dudka	Men's individual Compound open	655	23	Forsberg (FIN); L 136-141	Did not advance				
Piotr Sawicki	Men's individual Recurve open	621	8	Sanawi (MAS); W 6-0	Amarbayasgalan (MGL); W 6-2	Ranjbarkivaj (IRI); L 3-7	Did not advance		

Women

Athlete	Event	Ranking round		Round of 32	Round of 16	Quarterfinals	Semifinals	Final / BM	
Athlete	Event	Score	Seed	Opposition Score	Opposition Score	Opposition Score	Opposition Score	Opposition Score	Rank
Milena Olszewska	Women's individual Recurve open	619	4	Pooja (IND); W 6-2	Khuthawisap (THA); W 6-0	Melle (LAT); W 6-0	Wu (CHN); L 1-7	Lee (KOR); W 6-5	3rd place, bronze medalist(s)

Mixed

Athlete	Event	Ranking round		Round of 32	Round of 16	Quarterfinals	Semifinals	Final / BM	
Athlete	Event	Score	Seed	Opposition Score	Opposition Score	Opposition Score	Opposition Score	Opposition Score	Rank
Piotr Sawicki; Milena Olszewska	Team recurve open	1240	3	—N/a	Iraq (IRQ); W 6-2	Mongolia (MGL); L 4-5	Did not advance		

== Athletics ==
Men
Track

Athlete	Events	Heat		Semifinal		Final	
Athlete	Events	Time	Rank	Time	Rank	Time	Rank
Krzysztof Ciuksza	Men's 400m T36	—N/a				55.97	4
Krzysztof Ciuksza	Men's 800m T36	—N/a				2:16.90	6
Michał Derus	Men's 100m T45/46/47	10.79	3 Q	—N/a		10.79	2nd place, silver medalist(s)
Aleksander Kossakowski; Sylwester Lepiarz (guide)	Men's 1500m T11	—	DSQ	—N/a		Did not advance	
Rafał Korc	Men's 1500m T20	—N/a				3:56.54	4
Mateusz Michalski	Men's 100m T13	11.09	5 Q	—N/a		11.01	5
Daniel Pek	Men's 400m T20	52.43	10	—N/a		Did not advance	
Daniel Pek	Men's 1500m T20	—N/a				3:56.17	2nd place, silver medalist(s)
Łukasz Wietecki	Men's 5000m T12/13	—N/a				15:36.04	10
Łukasz Wietecki	Men's 1500m T12/T13	—N/a				3:54.20	5

Field

Athlete	Events	Result	Rank
Tomasz Blatkiewicz	Men's discus throw F37	44.26	8
Tomasz Blatkiewicz	Men's shot put F37	12.61	6
Michał Derus	Men's long jump T45/46/47	6.56	11
Adrian Imianowski	Men's discus throw F51/52	16.33	5
Robert Jachimowicz	Men's discus throw F51/52	19.10	2nd place, silver medalist(s)
Karol Kozuń	Men's shot put F54/55	11.33	4
Maciej Lepiato	Men's high jump T44	2.19 WR	1st place, gold medalist(s)
Maciej Lepiato	Men's long jump T43/44	6.05	11
Mirosław Madzia	Men's discus throw F11	32.50	7
Łukasz Mamczarz	Men's high jump T42	1.77	4
Paweł Piotrowski	Men's shot put F36	13.34	5
Janusz Rokicki	Men's shot put F56/57	14.26	2nd place, silver medalist(s)
Mariusz Sobczak	Men's long jump T36	5.15	6
Maciej Sochal	Men's club throw F31/32	33.91	1st place, gold medalist(s)
Maciej Sochal	Men's shot put F32	8.60	4
Lech Stoltman	Men's shot put F54/55	11.39	3rd place, bronze medalist(s)
Bartosz Tyszkowski	Men's javelin throw F40/41	35.93	8
Bartosz Tyszkowski	Men's shot put F41	13.56	2nd place, silver medalist(s)

Women

Track

Athlete	Events	Heat		Semifinal		Final	
Athlete	Events	Time	Rank	Time	Rank	Time	Rank
Alicja Fiodorow	Women's 100m T45/46/47	12.43	3 Q	—N/a		12.46	2nd place, silver medalist(s)
Alicja Fiodorow	Women's 200m T45/46/47	25.85	2 Q	—N/a		25.61	2nd place, silver medalist(s)
Joanna Mazur; Michał Stawicki (guide)	Women's 200m T11	26.62	10 Q	26.87	11	Did not advance	
Joanna Mazur; Michał Stawicki (guide)	Women's 400m T11	59.05	7	—N/a		Did not advance	
Arleta Meloch	Women's 400m T20	1:01.32	10	—N/a		Did not advance	
Arleta Meloch	Women's 1500m T20	—N/a				4:33.19	4
Barbara Niewiedzial	Women's 400m T20	59.20	4 Q	—N/a		58.51	3rd place, bronze medalist(s)
Barbara Niewiedzial	Women's 1500m T20	—N/a				4:24.37	1st place, gold medalist(s)
Katarzyna Piekart	Women's 100m T45/46/47	13.36	9	—N/a		Did not advance	
Sabina Stenka	Women's 400m T20	59.63	5 Q	—N/a		59.27	5
Sabina Stenka	Women's 1500m T20	—N/a				—	DNS
Anna Trener-Wierciak	Women's 100m T38	13.70	9	—N/a		Did not advance	

Field

Athlete	Events	Result	Rank
Ewa Durska	Women's shot put F20	13.94 WR	1st place, gold medalist(s)
Lucyna Kornobys	Women's shot put F34	8.00	2nd place, silver medalist(s)
Lucyna Kornobys	Women's javelin throw F34	17.88	4
Karolina Kucharczyk	Women's long jump T20	5.55	2nd place, silver medalist(s)
Katarzyna Piekart	Women's javelin throw F45/46	41.07	3rd place, bronze medalist(s)
Katarzyna Piekart	Women's long jump T45/46/47	5.05	8
Renata Śliwińska	Women's discus throw F40/41	23.34	6
Renata Śliwińska	Women's shot put F40	6.64	6
Anna Trener-Wierciak	Women's long jump T38	4.53	3rd place, bronze medalist(s)

== Cycling ==
With one pathway for qualification being one highest ranked NPCs on the UCI Para-Cycling male and female Nations Ranking Lists on 31 December 2014, Poland qualified for the 2016 Summer Paralympics in Rio, assuming they continued to meet all other eligibility requirements.

=== Road ===
Men

Athlete	Event	Time	Rank
Marcin Polak (Michał Ładosz - pilot)	Men's road race B	—	DNF
Marcin Polak (Michał Ładosz - pilot)	Men's time trial B	36:50.06	11
Przemysław Wegner (Artur Korc - pilot)	Men's road race B	2:31:46	7
Przemysław Wegner (Artur Korc - pilot)	Men's time trial B	36:18.39	5
Arkadiusz Skrzypiński	Men's road race H4	1:35:04	10
Arkadiusz Skrzypiński	Men's time trial H4	30:12.01	8
Rafał Wilk	Men's road race H4	1:28:51	2nd place, silver medalist(s)
Rafał Wilk	Men's time trial H4	27:39.31	1st place, gold medalist(s)

Women

Athlete	Event	Time	Rank
Anna Duzikowska (Natalia Morytko - pilot)	Women's road race B	2:12:14	13
Anna Duzikowska (Natalia Morytko - pilot)	Women's time trial B	43:28.31	14
Iwona Podkościelna (Aleksandra Tecław - pilot)	Women's road race B	1:58:02	1st place, gold medalist(s)
Iwona Podkościelna (Aleksandra Tecław - pilot)	Women's time trial B	39:54.45	5
Anna Harkowska	Women's road race C4-5	2:19:11	2nd place, silver medalist(s)
Anna Harkowska	Women's time trial C5	28:52.79	2nd place, silver medalist(s)
Renata Kałuża	Women's road race H1-2-3-4	1:16:01	5
Renata Kałuża	Women's time trial H1-2-3	34:33.96	4

=== Track ===
Pursuits and time trials

Men

Athlete	Event	Qualification		Final	
Athlete	Event	Time	Rank	Opposition Time	Rank
Marcin Polak (Michał Ładosz - pilot)	Men's individual pursuit B	4:27.997	11	Did not advance	
Przemysław Wegner (Artur Korc - pilot)	Men's individual pursuit B	4:26.972	10	Did not advance	

Women

Athlete	Event	Qualification		Final	
Athlete	Event	Time	Rank	Opposition Time	Rank
Anna Duzikowska (Natalia Morytko - pilot)	Women's individual pursuit B	3:48.026	12	Did not advance	
Anna Duzikowska (Natalia Morytko - pilot)	Women's 1000m time trial B	1:14.889	11	Did not advance	
Iwona Podkościelna (Aleksandra Tecław - pilot)	Women's individual pursuit B	3:41.944	8	Did not advance	
Iwona Podkościelna (Aleksandra Tecław - pilot)	Women's 1000m time trial B	1:13.411	9	Did not advance	
Anna Harkowska	Women's individual pursuit C5	3:53.745	4 Q	3:54.701	4
Anna Harkowska	Women's 500m time trial C4-5	41.094	13	Did not advance	

== Equestrian ==
The country earned an individual slot via the Para Equestrian Individual Ranking List Allocation method.

Individual

Athlete	Horse	Event	Total	
Athlete	Horse	Event	Score	Rank
Karolina Karwowska	Emol	Individual championship test grade III	61.683	16

== Paracanoeing ==
Poland earned a qualifying spot at the 2016 Summer Paralympics in this sport following their performance at the 2015 ICF Canoe Sprint & Paracanoe World Championships in Milan, Italy where the top six finishers in each Paralympic event earned a qualifying spot for their nation. Jakub Tokarz earned the spot for Poland after finishing second in the men's KL1 event. Mateusz Surwilo earned a second spot for Poland after finishing seventh in the men's KL3 event. He qualified because a country only gets one canoe per event, and Russia had two canoes ahead of them.

Athlete	Event	Heats		Repechage		Final	
Athlete	Event	Time	Rank	Time	Rank	Time	Rank
Jakub Tokarz	Men's KL1	55.469	3 R	54.241	1 FA	51.084	1st place, gold medalist(s)
Mateusz Surwiło	Men's KL3	50.339	5 R	45.189	5	Did not advance	
Kamila Kubas	Women's KL1	1:01.387	2 FA	—N/a		1:00.232	3rd place, bronze medalist(s)

== Powerlifting ==
Men

Athlete	Event	Total lifted	Rank
Mariusz Tomczyk	Men's –59 kg	—	DNF
Grzegorz Lanzer	Men's –65 kg	170	8
Marek Trykacz	Men's –72 kg	173	4

Women

Athlete	Event	Total lifted	Rank
Justyna Kozdryk	Women's –45 kg	95	4
Małgorzata Hałas-Koralewska	Women's –61 kg	100	4
Marzena Zięba	Women's +86 kg	134	2nd place, silver medalist(s)

== Rowing ==
One pathway for qualifying for Rio involved having a boat have top eight finish at the 2015 FISA World Rowing Championships in a medal event. France qualified for the 2016 Games under this criterion in the TA Mixed Double Sculls event with a seventh-place finish in a time of 04:08.770.

Athlete(s)	Event	Heats		Repechage		Final	
Athlete(s)	Event	Time	Rank	Time	Rank	Time	Rank
Jolanta Majka; Michał Gadowski	Mixed double sculls	4:08.02	4 R	4:07.25	2 FA	4:06.26	6

Qualification Legend: FA=Final A (medal); FB=Final B (non-medal); R=Repechage

== Sailing ==
One pathway for qualifying for Rio involved having a boat have top seven finish at the 2015 Combined World Championships in a medal event where the country had nor already qualified through via the 2014 IFDS Sailing World Championships. Poland qualified for the 2016 Games under this criterion in the SKUD 18 event with a fifth-place finish overall and the second country who had not qualified via the 2014 Championships. The boat was crewed by Monika Gibes and Piotr Cichocki.

Athlete	Event	Race											Total points	Net points	Rank
Athlete	Event	1	2	3	4	5	6	7	8	9	10	11	Total points	Net points	Rank
Monika Gibes; Piotr Cichocki	SKUD 18	3	~~12~~	2	4	3	12	3	2	5	2	1	37	49	4

== Shooting ==
Athlete	Event	Qualification		Final	
Athlete	Event	Score	Rank	Score	Rank
Filip Rodzik	Men's 10m air pistol SH1	534	31	Did not advance	
Szymon Sowiński	Men's 10m air pistol SH1	561	6 Q	153.4	4
Filip Rodzik	Mixed 25 metre pistol SH1	548	21	Did not advance	
Szymon Sowiński	Mixed 25 metre pistol SH1	557	16	Did not advance	
Filip Rodzik	Mixed 50 metre pistol SH1	458	34	Did not advance	
Szymon Sowiński	Mixed 50 metre pistol SH1	525	10	Did not advance	

== Swimming ==
Men

Athlete	Events	Heats		Final	
Athlete	Events	Time	Rank	Time	Rank
Patryk Biskup	100 m freestyle S9	1:10.78	19	Did not advance	
Patryk Biskup	400 m freestyle S9	4:35.68	11	Did not advance	
Patryk Biskup	100 m backstroke S9	1:05.00	1 Q	1:05.10	5
Patryk Biskup	200 m individual medley SM9	2:28.59	12	Did not advance	
Jacek Czech	200 m freestyle S2	did not start			
Jacek Czech	50 m backstroke S2	1:02.28	6 Q	1:01.91	6
Jacek Czech	100 m backstroke S2	2:24.83	8 q	2:17.08	7
Wojciech Makowski	50 m freestyle S11	27.93	12	Did not advance	
Wojciech Makowski	100 m freestyle S11	1:01.53	6 Q	1:01.74	7
Wojciech Makowski	100 m backstroke S11	1:09.40	1 Q	1:08.28	2nd place, silver medalist(s)
Kamil Rzetelski	50 m freestyle S13	26.09	14	Did not advance	
Kamil Rzetelski	100 m freestyle S13	58.20	20	Did not advance	
Kamil Rzetelski	100 m butterfly S13	1:02.73	15	Did not advance	
Kamil Rzetelski	100 m breastroke SB13	1:14.62	10	Did not advance	

Women

Athlete	Events	Heats		Final	
Athlete	Events	Time	Rank	Time	Rank
Karolina Hamer	50 m freestyle S4	57.11	13	Did not advance	
Karolina Hamer	50 m backstroke S4	1:03.11	9	Did not advance	
Karolina Hamer	150 m individual medley SM4	3:21.26	7	—	DSQ
Oliwia Jabłońska	50 m freestyle S10	29.41	11	Did not advance	
Oliwia Jabłońska	400 m freestyle S10	4:47.30	6 Q	4:35.52	4
Oliwia Jabłońska	100 m butterfly S10	1:11.22	5 Q	1:08.77	3rd place, bronze medalist(s)
Joanna Mendak	50 m freestyle S13	28.64	5 Q	28.35	5
Joanna Mendak	100 m freestyle S13	1:03.73	11	Did not advance	
Joanna Mendak	100 m butterfly S13	1:08.06	6 Q	1:08.37	7
Paulina Woźniak	100 m butterfly S9	1:17.27	17	Did not advance	
Paulina Woźniak	100 m breaststroke SB8	1:25.21	3 Q	1:25.04	4
Paulina Woźniak	200 m individual medley SM9	2:42.72	12	Did not advance	

== Table tennis ==
Men

Athlete	Event	Group			Round of 16	Quarterfinals	Semifinals	Final	Rank
Athlete	Event	Opposition Result	Opposition Result	Rank	Opposition Result	Opposition Result	Opposition Result	Opposition Result	Rank
Rafał Czuper	Singles class 2	Conceicao Espindola (BRA); W 3-0	Gao (CHN); W 3-0	1 Q	—N/a	Ludrovsky (SVK); W 3-0	Molliens (FRA); W 3-1	Lamirault (FRA); L 1-3	2nd place, silver medalist(s)
Maciej Nalepka	Singles class 3	Merrien (FRA); L 0-3	Rodriguez Martinez (ESP); L 0-3	3	Did not advance				
Krzysztof Żyłka	Singles class 4	Kim (KOR); L w/o 0-3	Mihalik (SVK); L 2-3	3	Did not advance				
Rafał Lis	Singles class 4	Choi (KOR); W 3-2	Vural (TUR); W 3-0	1 Q	—N/a	Turan (TUR); L 2-3	Did not advance		
Piotr Grudzień	Singles class 8	Ye (CHN); W 3-2	Mizrachi (AUS); W 3-0	1 Q	—N/a	Karlsson (SWE); W 3-2	Zhao (CHN); L 2-3	Ye (CHN); W 3-2	3rd place, bronze medalist(s)
Marcin Skrzynecki	Singles class 8	Andersson (SWE); W 3-2	Wilson (GBR); W 3-1	1 Q	Csonka (HUN); L 2-3	Did not advance			
Patryk Chojnowski	Singles class 10	Cardona Marquez (ESP); W 3-0	Karabec (CZE); W 3-1	1 Q	—N/a	Boheas (FRA); W 3-1	Gardos (AUT); W 3-0	Ge (CHN); L 2-3	2nd place, silver medalist(s)

Men's team

Athlete	Event	Round of 16	Quarterfinals	Semifinals	Final	
Athlete	Event	Opposition Result	Opposition Result	Opposition Result	Opposition Result	Rank
Rafał Czuper; Maciej Nalepka	Team C3	—N/a	Thailand (THA); L 1-2	Did not advance		
Rafał Lis; Krzysztof Żyłka	Team C4-5	Nigeria (NGR); L 1-2	Did not advance			
Patryk Chojnowski; Piotr Grudzień; Marcin Skrzynecki	Team C3	—N/a	Netherlands (NED); W 2-1	Spain (ESP); L 1-2	France (FRA); W 2-0	3rd place, bronze medalist(s)

Women

Athlete	Event	Group				Round of 16	Quarterfinals	Semifinals	Final	Rank
Athlete	Event	Opposition Result	Opposition Result	Opposition Result	Rank	Opposition Result	Opposition Result	Opposition Result	Opposition Result	Rank
Dorota Bucław	Singles class 1-2	Lafaye (FRA); L 0-3	—N/a	—N/a	2 Q	—N/a	Rossi (ITA); L 2-3	Did not advance		
Katarzyna Marszał	Singles class 6	Lytovchenko (UKR); L 0-3	Grebe (GER); L 1-3	—N/a	3	—N/a		Did not advance		
Karolina Pęk	Singles class 9	Kramm (GER); W 3-0	Xiong (CHN); W 3-2	Rauen (BRA); W 3-1	1 Q	—N/a		Liu (CHN); L 2-3	Rauen (BRA); W 3-2	3rd place, bronze medalist(s)
Natalia Partyka	Singles class 10	Walloe (DEN); W 3-0	Tapper (AUS); W 3-0	Ertis (TUR); W 3-0	1 Q	—N/a		Costa Alexandre (BRA); W 3-2	Yang (CHN) W 3-0	1st place, gold medalist(s)
Dorota Nowacka	Singles class 11	Kosmina (UKR); L 0-3	Wong (HKG); L 2-3	—N/a	3	—N/a		Did not advance		
Krystyna Siemieniecka	Singles class 11	Ito (JPN); W 3-0	Ng (HKG); W 3-2	—N/a	1 Q	—N/a		Wong (HKG); W 3-1	Kosmina (UKR); L 0-3	2nd place, silver medalist(s)

Women's team

Athlete	Event	Round of 16	Quarterfinals	Semifinals	Final	
Athlete	Event	Opposition Result	Opposition Result	Opposition Result	Opposition Result	Rank
Katarzyna Marszal; Natalia Partyka; Karolina Pęk	Team C6-10	—N/a	France (FRA); W 2-1	Brazil (BRA); W 2-0	China (CHN); W 2-1	1st place, gold medalist(s)

== Wheelchair fencing ==
Men

Athlete	Event	Qualification			Quarterfinal	Semifinal	Final / BM	
Athlete	Event	Opposition	Score	Rank	Opposition Score	Opposition Score	Opposition Score	Rank
Adrian Castro	Men's individual sabre B	Cheema (GER)	W 5–1	2 Q	Feng (CHN); W 15–11	Datsko (UKR); L8–15	Pluta (POL); W 15–8	3rd place, bronze medalist(s)
Adrian Castro	Men's individual sabre B	Triantafyllou (GRE)	L 3–5	2 Q	Feng (CHN); W 15–11	Datsko (UKR); L8–15	Pluta (POL); W 15–8	3rd place, bronze medalist(s)
Adrian Castro	Men's individual sabre B	Feng (CHN)	W 5–1	2 Q	Feng (CHN); W 15–11	Datsko (UKR); L8–15	Pluta (POL); W 15–8	3rd place, bronze medalist(s)
Adrian Castro	Men's individual sabre B	Mainville (CAN)	W 5–1	2 Q	Feng (CHN); W 15–11	Datsko (UKR); L8–15	Pluta (POL); W 15–8	3rd place, bronze medalist(s)
Grzegorz Pluta	Men's individual sabre B	Datsko (UKR)	W 5–4	3 Q	Sarri (ITA); W 15–13	Triantafyllou (GRE); L14–15	Castro (POL); L 8–15	4
Grzegorz Pluta	Men's individual sabre B	Cratere (FRA)	L 4–5	3 Q	Sarri (ITA); W 15–13	Triantafyllou (GRE); L14–15	Castro (POL); L 8–15	4
Grzegorz Pluta	Men's individual sabre B	Brinson (USA)	W 5–2	3 Q	Sarri (ITA); W 15–13	Triantafyllou (GRE); L14–15	Castro (POL); L 8–15	4
Grzegorz Pluta	Men's individual sabre B	Sarri (ITA)	L 1–5	3 Q	Sarri (ITA); W 15–13	Triantafyllou (GRE); L14–15	Castro (POL); L 8–15	4
Jacek Gaworski	Men's individual foil B	Chaves (BRA)	W 5–2	1 Q	Valet (FRA); L 6-15	Did not advance		
Jacek Gaworski	Men's individual foil B	Hu (CHN)	W 5–4	1 Q	Valet (FRA); L 6-15	Did not advance		
Jacek Gaworski	Men's individual foil B	Guissone (BRA)	W 5–0	1 Q	Valet (FRA); L 6-15	Did not advance		
Jacek Gaworski	Men's individual foil B	Cima (ITA)	W 5–3	1 Q	Valet (FRA); L 6-15	Did not advance		
Michał Nalewajek	Men's individual foil A	Gilliver (GBR)	W 5–2	3 Q	Osvath (HUN); L 8-15	Did not advance		
Michał Nalewajek	Men's individual foil A	Cheong (HKG)	W 5–0	3 Q	Osvath (HUN); L 8-15	Did not advance		
Michał Nalewajek	Men's individual foil A	Betti (ITA)	W 5–2	3 Q	Osvath (HUN); L 8-15	Did not advance		
Michał Nalewajek	Men's individual foil A	Osvath (HUN)	L 2–5	3 Q	Osvath (HUN); L 8-15	Did not advance		
Michał Nalewajek	Men's individual foil A	Ye (CHN)	L 1–5	3 Q	Osvath (HUN); L 8-15	Did not advance		
Dariusz Pender	Men's individual épée A	Colaco (BRA)	W 5–0	4 Q	Sun (CHN); L 10–15	Did not advance		
Dariusz Pender	Men's individual épée A	Tian (CHN)	L 4–5	4 Q	Sun (CHN); L 10–15	Did not advance		
Dariusz Pender	Men's individual épée A	Gilliver (GBR)	L 4–5	4 Q	Sun (CHN); L 10–15	Did not advance		
Dariusz Pender	Men's individual épée A	Citerne (FRA)	L 2–5	4 Q	Sun (CHN); L 10–15	Did not advance		
Dariusz Pender	Men's individual épée A	Mato (HUN)	L 3–5	4 Q	Sun (CHN); L 10–15	Did not advance		
Dariusz Pender	Men's individual foil A	Kavalenia (BLR)	W 5–1	2 Q	Betti (ITA); W 15-14	Ye (CHN); L 2-15	Sun (CHN); L 11-15	4
Dariusz Pender	Men's individual foil A	Lambertini (ITA)	W 5–2	2 Q	Betti (ITA); W 15-14	Ye (CHN); L 2-15	Sun (CHN); L 11-15	4
Dariusz Pender	Men's individual foil A	Tokatlian (FRA)	W 5–3	2 Q	Betti (ITA); W 15-14	Ye (CHN); L 2-15	Sun (CHN); L 11-15	4
Dariusz Pender	Men's individual foil A	Sun (CHN)	L 3–5	2 Q	Betti (ITA); W 15-14	Ye (CHN); L 2-15	Sun (CHN); L 11-15	4
Dariusz Pender	Men's individual foil A	Chan (HKG)	W 5–0	2 Q	Betti (ITA); W 15-14	Ye (CHN); L 2-15	Sun (CHN); L 11-15	4
Kamil Rząsa	Men's individual épée B	Ali (IRQ)	L 1–4	3 Q	Ifebe (FRA); L 12–15	Did not advance		
Kamil Rząsa	Men's individual épée B	Massarutt (BRA)	'W 5–2	3 Q	Ifebe (FRA); L 12–15	Did not advance		
Kamil Rząsa	Men's individual épée B	Cratere (FRA)	W 3–2	3 Q	Ifebe (FRA); L 12–15	Did not advance		
Kamil Rząsa	Men's individual épée B	Guissone (BRA)	W 5–3	3 Q	Ifebe (FRA); L 12–15	Did not advance		
Michał Nalewajek; Dariusz Pender; Kamil Rząsa	Men's team épée	China (CHN)	L 38-45	2 Q	—N/a	France (FRA); L 28-45	Greece (GRE); W 45-29	3rd place, bronze medalist(s)
Michał Nalewajek; Dariusz Pender; Kamil Rząsa	Men's team épée	Italy (ITA)	W 45-27	2 Q	—N/a	France (FRA); L 28-45	Greece (GRE); W 45-29	3rd place, bronze medalist(s)
Jacek Gaworski; Michał Nalewajek; Dariusz Pender	Men's team foil	Italy (ITA)	W 45-42	1 Q	—N/a	France (FRA); W 45-37	China (CHN); L 27-45	2nd place, silver medalist(s)
Jacek Gaworski; Michał Nalewajek; Dariusz Pender	Men's team foil	Hong Kong (HKG)	W 45-35	1 Q	—N/a	France (FRA); W 45-37	China (CHN); L 27-45	2nd place, silver medalist(s)

Women

Athlete	Event	Qualification			Quarterfinal	Semifinal	Final / BM	
Athlete	Event	Opposition	Score	Rank	Opposition Score	Opposition Score	Opposition Score	Rank
Renata Burdon	Women's individual épée A	Collis (GBR)	L 2–5	5	Did not advance			
Renata Burdon	Women's individual épée A	Halkina (BLR)	L 1–5	5	Did not advance			
Renata Burdon	Women's individual épée A	Krajnyak (HUN)	'L 1–5	5	Did not advance			
Renata Burdon	Women's individual épée A	Deluca (USA)	L 4–5	5	Did not advance			
Renata Burdon	Women's individual épée A	Zou (CHN)	L 1–5	5	Did not advance			
Marta Fidrych	Women's individual épée A	Bian (CHN)	W 5–3	2 Q	Bian (CHN); L 12–15	Did not advance		
Marta Fidrych	Women's individual épée A	Breus (UKR)	W 5–2	2 Q	Bian (CHN); L 12–15	Did not advance		
Marta Fidrych	Women's individual épée A	Yu (HKG)	W 5–0	2 Q	Bian (CHN); L 12–15	Did not advance		
Marta Fidrych	Women's individual épée A	Rozkova (LAT)	W 5–2	2 Q	Bian (CHN); L 12–15	Did not advance		
Marta Fidrych	Women's individual épée A	Veres (HUN)	L 2–5	2 Q	Bian (CHN); L 12–15	Did not advance		
Marta Makowska	Women's individual épée B	Yao (CHN)	L 3–5	3 Q	Jana (THA); L 5–15	Did not advance		
Marta Makowska	Women's individual épée B	Pozniak (UKR)	W 5–2	3 Q	Jana (THA); L 5–15	Did not advance		
Marta Makowska	Women's individual épée B	Briese-Baetke (GER)	L 4–5	3 Q	Jana (THA); L 5–15	Did not advance		
Marta Makowska	Women's individual épée B	Loufaki (GRE)	W 5–0	3 Q	Jana (THA); L 5–15	Did not advance		
Marta Makowska	Women's individual épée B	Demaude (FRA)	W 5–2	3 Q	Jana (THA); L 5–15	Did not advance		
Marta Makowska	Women's individual foil B	Demaude (FRA)	W 5–3	4 Q	Vio (ITA) L 6-15	Did not advance		
Marta Makowska	Women's individual foil B	Chan (HKG)	L 0–5	4 Q	Vio (ITA) L 6-15	Did not advance		
Marta Makowska	Women's individual foil B	Zhou (CHN)	L 1–5	4 Q	Vio (ITA) L 6-15	Did not advance		
Marta Makowska	Women's individual foil B	Dani (HUN)	W 5–2	4 Q	Vio (ITA) L 6-15	Did not advance		
Marta Makowska	Women's individual foil B	Pozniak (UKR)	L 3–5	4 Q	Vio (ITA) L 6-15	Did not advance		
Renata Burdon; Marta Fidrych; Marta Makowska	Women's team épée	Hong Kong (HKG)	L 27-45	2 Q	—N/a	China (CHN); L 39-45	Hungary (HUN); L 44-45	4
Renata Burdon; Marta Fidrych; Marta Makowska	Women's team épée	Brazil (BRA)	W 45-25	2 Q	—N/a	China (CHN); L 39-45	Hungary (HUN); L 44-45	4

== Wheelchair tennis ==
Poland qualified two competitor in the men's single event, Kamil Fabisiak and Tadeusz Kruszelnicki.

Athlete	Event	Round of 64	Round of 32	Round of 16	Quarterfinals	Semifinals	Final / BM	
Athlete	Event	Opposition Score	Opposition Score	Opposition Score	Opposition Score	Opposition Score	Opposition Score	Rank
Kamil Fabisiak	Men's singles	Pommê (BRA); W 6-1, 6-2	Sanada (JPN); L 0-6, 1-6	Did not advance				
Tadeusz Kruszelnicki	Men's singles	Ledesma (ARG); W 6-2, 6-2	Scheffers (NED); L 2-6, 0-6	Did not advance				
Kamil Fabisiak; Tadeusz Kruszelnicki	Men's doubles	—N/a	Kellerman / Weekes (AUS); W 7-5, 3-6, 6-3	Miki / Sanada (JPN); L 2-6, 2-6	Did not advance			

== See also ==
- Poland at the 2016 Summer Olympics
