= Hong Kong at the Paralympics =

- IPC code: HKG
- NPC: China Hong Kong Paralympic Committee
- Website: https://www.paralympic.hk
- Medals Ranked 38th: Gold 43 Silver 43 Bronze 53 Total 139

Summer appearances
- 1972; 1976; 1980; 1984; 1988; 1992; 1996; 2000; 2004; 2008; 2012; 2016; 2020; 2024

Hong Kong made its Paralympic Games début at the 1972 Summer Paralympics in Heidelberg, and has taken part in every subsequent edition of the Summer Paralympics. It has never participated in the Winter Paralympics.

The territory's first gold medals came in 1984, when Hong Kong won the women's 4 × 400 m Relay in categories 2–5 in athletics. Mui Y. L. also won an individual gold in the women's 1,500m, category 3; and Fung Yuet-wah took gold in the women's individual foil (categories 4–5) in wheelchair fencing. Table tennis was the source of all three gold medals won in 1992, as Hong Kong players won the women's team event in category 5, the men's team in category 4, and Kwong Kam-shing won the men's singles in category 5.

In 1996, it was the men's 4 × 100 m relay (T34) which yielded gold in athletics, accompanying four gold medals in men's wheelchair fencing events. Wheelchair fencing has provided gold medals for Hong Kong in every subsequent edition of the Summer Paralympics, as has athletics. Lai Wai-ling added a gold medal in table tennis (category 11) in 2000, whereas boccia provided two gold in 2004, and one in 2008. Hong Kong's most successful competitors, are Yu Chui-yee in wheelchair fencing, who won seven gold medals, and So Wa-wai in athletics, who won twelve medals, including six gold, three silver and three bronze.

== Medals ==
=== Summer Paralympics ===
Games	Athletes	Gold	Silver	Bronze	Total	Rank
(Italy) 1960 Rome	did not participate					
(Japan) 1964 Tokyo	did not participate					
(Israel) 1968 Tel Aviv	did not participate					
(Germany) Heidelberg 1972	10	0	1	1	2	29
(Canada) Toronto 1976	11	0	1	2	3	31
(Netherlands) Arnhem 1980	11	0	1	2	3	35
(United States) New York 1984	25	3	5	9	17	27
(South Korea) Seoul 1988	42	0	2	7	9	42
(Spain) Barcelona 1992	21	3	4	4	11	28
(United States) Atlanta 1996	25	5	5	5	15	27
(Australia) Sydney 2000	28	8	3	7	18	21
(Greece) Athens 2004	23	11	7	1	19	17
(China) Beijing 2008	21	5	3	3	11	26
(United Kingdom) London 2012	28	3	3	6	12	34
(Brazil) Rio de Janeiro 2016	24	2	2	2	6	40
(Japan) Tokyo 2020	24	0	2	3	5	68
(France) Paris 2024	23	3	4	1	8	32
(United States) Los Angeles 2028	Future Event					
(Australia) Brisbane 2032	Future Event					
Total		43	43	53	139	34

=== Winter Paralympics ===
Games	Athletes	Gold	Silver	Bronze	Total	Rank
(Sweden) Örnsköldsvik 1976	did not participate					
(Norway) Geilo 1980	did not participate					
(Austria) Innsbruck 1984	did not participate					
(Austria) Innsbruck 1988	did not participate					
(France) Albertville 1992	did not participate					
(Norway) Lillehammer 1994	did not participate					
(Japan) Nagano 1998	did not participate					
(United States) Salt Lake City 2002	did not participate					
(Italy) Turin 2006	did not participate					
(Canada) Vancouver 2010	did not participate					
(Russia) Sochi 2014	did not participate					
(South Korea) Pyeongchang 2018	did not participate					
(China) Beijing 2022	did not participate					
(Italy) Milano Cortina 2026	future event					
Total		0	0	0	0	−

=== Medals by Summer Sport ===
Games	Gold	Silver	Bronze	Total
Wheelchair Fencing	22	18	16	56
Athletics	8	8	18	33
Boccia	7	4	1	12
Table Tennis	5	9	11	25
Swimming	1	1	4	6
Badminton	0	2	1	3
Lawn Bowls	0	1	1	2
Shooting	0	0	1	1
Total	43	43	53	139

=== Medals by Winter Sport ===
Games	Gold	Silver	Bronze	Total
Total	0	0	0	0

== Medalists ==
Medal	Name	Games	Sport	Event
Silver	Leslie Lam	(West Germany) 1972 Heidelberg	Table tennis	Men's singles 2
Bronze	Men's team	(West Germany) 1972 Heidelberg	Table tennis	Men's teams 2
Silver	Wong Shek-kau	(Canada) 1976 Toronto	Table tennis	Men's singles C
Bronze	Tong Hon-keung	(Canada) 1976 Toronto	Table tennis	Men's singles C
Bronze	Wong Shek-kau	(Canada) 1976 Toronto	Athletics	Men's high jump C
Silver	Ko Shing-chi	(Netherlands) 1980 Arnhem	Athletics	Men's 100m F
Bronze	Ko Shing-chi	(Netherlands) 1980 Arnhem	Athletics	Men's long jump F
Bronze	Tong Hon-keung; Shek Kau Wong	(Netherlands) 1980 Arnhem	Table tennis	Men's teams C
Gold	Mui Y. L.	(United Kingdom) / (United States) 1984 Stoke Mandeville/New York	Athletics	Women's 1500m 3
Gold	Women's team	(United Kingdom) / (United States) 1984 Stoke Mandeville/New York	Athletics	Women's 4 × 400 m relay 2–5
Gold	Fung Yuet-wah	(United Kingdom) / (United States) 1984 Stoke Mandeville/New York	Wheelchair fencing	Women's foil individual 4–5
Silver	Wong Y. M.	(United Kingdom) / (United States) 1984 Stoke Mandeville/New York	Athletics	Women's 5000m 3
Silver	Women's team	(United Kingdom) / (United States) 1984 Stoke Mandeville/New York	Athletics	Women's 4 × 200 m relay 2–5
Silver	Wong	(United Kingdom) / (United States) 1984 Stoke Mandeville/New York	Table tennis	Women's open 1B-4
Silver	Wong	(United Kingdom) / (United States) 1984 Stoke Mandeville/New York	Table tennis	Women's singles 4
Silver	Women's team	(United Kingdom) / (United States) 1984 Stoke Mandeville/New York	Table tennis	Women's teams 4
Bronze	Wong Y. M.	(United Kingdom) / (United States) 1984 Stoke Mandeville/New York	Athletics	Women's 800m 3
Bronze	Wong Y. M.	(United Kingdom) / (United States) 1984 Stoke Mandeville/New York	Athletics	Women's 1500m 3
Bronze	Mui Y. K.	(United Kingdom) / (United States) 1984 Stoke Mandeville/New York	Athletics	Women's 5000m 3
Bronze	Wong Y.	(United Kingdom) / (United States) 1984 Stoke Mandeville/New York	Athletics	Women's 5000m 5
Bronze	Women's team	(United Kingdom) / (United States) 1984 Stoke Mandeville/New York	Athletics	Women's 4 × 100 m relay 2–5
Bronze	Stephen Cheung	(United Kingdom) / (United States) 1984 Stoke Mandeville/New York	Swimming	Men's 50m breaststroke B3
Bronze	Men's team	(United Kingdom) / (United States) 1984 Stoke Mandeville/New York	Table tennis	Men's teams 4
Bronze	Cheung King-bor; Lau Koon-tong; Lai Man-kee; Lau Sik; Chan Sze-kit	(United Kingdom) / (United States) 1984 Stoke Mandeville/New York	Wheelchair fencing	Men's épée team
Bronze	Fung Yuet-wah; Yuen Shuk-han; Anyette Chow	(United Kingdom) / (United States) 1984 Stoke Mandeville/New York	Wheelchair fencing	Women's foil team
Silver	Wong Ying	(South Korea) 1988 Seoul	Wheelchair fencing	Women's épée 4–6
Silver	Yuen Shuk-han	(South Korea) 1988 Seoul	Wheelchair fencing	Women's foil 1C-3
Bronze	Cheung Yiu-cheung	(South Korea) 1988 Seoul	Athletics	Men's 100m C7
Bronze	Chan Shing-chung; Chan Wai-hung; Chang Siu-hang; Cheung Yiu-cheung	(South Korea) 1988 Seoul	Athletics	Men's 4 × 100 m relay C7-8
Bronze	Chan Kam-tim; Cho Ping; Ng Kam-mui; Wong Mei-lan	(South Korea) 1988 Seoul	Athletics	Women's 4 × 100 m relay 2–6
Bronze	Leung Shui-mai	(South Korea) 1988 Seoul	Shooting	Women's air rifle kneeling 2–6
Bronze	Men's team	(South Korea) 1988 Seoul	Table tennis	Men's team 4
Bronze	Lau Sik	(South Korea) 1988 Seoul	Wheelchair fencing	Men's épée 1C-3
Bronze	Yuen Shuk-han	(South Korea) 1988 Seoul	Wheelchair fencing	Women's épée 1C-3
Gold	Kwong Kam-shing	(Spain) 1992 Barcelona	Table tennis	Men's singles 5
Gold	Ho Sum-tak; Wong Yin-biu	(Spain) 1992 Barcelona	Table tennis	Men's teams 4
Gold	Fung Yuet-wah; Wong Pui-yi	(Spain) 1992 Barcelona	Table tennis	Women's teams 5
Silver	Chan Shing-chung	(Spain) 1992 Barcelona	Athletics	Men's 100m C8
Silver	Chan Sze-kit	(Spain) 1992 Barcelona	Wheelchair fencing	Men's foil 2
Silver	Chan Kam-loi; Chan Sze-kit; Kwong Wai-ip; Lau Sik	(Spain) 1992 Barcelona	Wheelchair fencing	Men's team foil
Silver	Chan Sze-kit	(Spain) 1992 Barcelona	Wheelchair fencing	Men's sabre 2
Bronze	Cheung Yiu	(Spain) 1992 Barcelona	Athletics	Men's 100m C7
Bronze	Kwong Kam-shing; Ip Sui-lam	(Spain) 1992 Barcelona	Table tennis	Men's teams 5
Bronze	Fung Yuet-wah	(Spain) 1992 Barcelona	Table tennis	Women's open 1–5
Bronze	Fung Yuet-wah	(Spain) 1992 Barcelona	Table tennis	Women's singles 5
Gold	Chan Shing-chung; Chao Kwok-pang; Cheung Yiu-cheung; So Wa-wai	(United States) 1996 Atlanta	Athletics	Men's 4 × 100 m relay T34-37
Gold	Cheung Wai-leung	(United States) 1996 Atlanta	Wheelchair fencing	Men's épée individual A
Gold	Chui Man-fai; Cheung Wai-leung; Kwong Wai-ip; Tai Yan-yun	(United States) 1996 Atlanta	Wheelchair fencing	Men's épée team
Gold	Cheung Wai-leung	(United States) 1996 Atlanta	Wheelchair fencing	Men's foil individual A
Gold	Chan Kam-loi; Chan Sze-kit; Cheung Wai-leung; Kwong Wai-ip	(United States) 1996 Atlanta	Wheelchair fencing	Men's foil team
Silver	Tang Lai	(United States) 1996 Atlanta	Lawn bowls	Women's singles LB7/8
Silver	Kwong Kam-shing	(United States) 1996 Atlanta	Table tennis	Men's singles 5
Silver	Wong Pui-yi	(United States) 1996 Atlanta	Table tennis	Women's open 1–5
Silver	Fung Yuet-wah; Wong Pui-yi	(United States) 1996 Atlanta	Table tennis	Women's teams 3–5
Silver	Chan Kam-loi; Chui Man-fai; Chan Sze-kit; Tai Yan-yun	(United States) 1996 Atlanta	Wheelchair fencing	Men's sabre team
Bronze	Cheung Yiu-cheung	(United States) 1996 Atlanta	Athletics	Men's 400m T36
Bronze	Chiu Chung-lun	(United States) 1996 Atlanta	Lawn bowls	Men's singles LB3-5
Bronze	Fung Yuet-wah	(United States) 1996 Atlanta	Table tennis	Women's open 1–5
Bronze	Chan Kam-loi	(United States) 1996 Atlanta	Wheelchair fencing	Men's foil individual A
Bronze	Tai Yan-yun	(United States) 1996 Atlanta	Wheelchair fencing	Men's sabre individual A
Gold	So Wa-wai	(Australia) 2000 Sydney	Athletics	Men's 100m T36
Gold	So Wa-wai	(Australia) 2000 Sydney	Athletics	Men's 200m T36
Gold	So Wa-wai	(Australia) 2000 Sydney	Athletics	Men's 400m T36
Gold	Lai Wai-ling	(Australia) 2000 Sydney	Table tennis	Women's singles C11
Gold	Fung Ying-ki	(Australia) 2000 Sydney	Wheelchair fencing	Men's foil individual A
Gold	Hui Charn-hung	(Australia) 2000 Sydney	Wheelchair fencing	Men's foil individual B
Gold	Chan Kam-loi; Fung Ying-ki; Hui Charn-hung; Kwong Wai-ip	(Australia) 2000 Sydney	Wheelchair fencing	Men's foil team
Gold	Fung Ying-ki	(Australia) 2000 Sydney	Wheelchair fencing	Men's sabre individual A
Silver	Tsang Ka-yan	(Australia) 2000 Sydney	Athletics	Women's long jump F20
Silver	Chung Ting-ching	(Australia) 2000 Sydney	Wheelchair fencing	Men's épée individual B
Silver	Chung Ting-ching	(Australia) 2000 Sydney	Wheelchair fencing	Men's foil individual B
Bronze	So Wa-wai; Chao Kwok-pang; Chan Shing-chung; Cheung Yiu-cheung	(Australia) 2000 Sydney	Athletics	Men's 4 × 100 m relay T38
Bronze	So Wa-wai; Chao Kwok-pang; Chan Shing-chung; Cheung Yiu-cheung	(Australia) 2000 Sydney	Athletics	Men's 4 × 400 m relay T38
Bronze	Yu Chun-lai	(Australia) 2000 Sydney	Athletics	Women's 100m T36
Bronze	Yu Chun-lai	(Australia) 2000 Sydney	Athletics	Women's 200m T36
Bronze	Yu Chun-lai	(Australia) 2000 Sydney	Athletics	Women's 400m T36
Bronze	Chung Ting-ching; Kwong Wai-ip; Tai Yan-yun	(Australia) 2000 Sydney	Wheelchair fencing	Men's épée team
Bronze	Chan Kam-loi; Fung Ying-ki; Hui Charn-hung; Tai Yan-yun	(Australia) 2000 Sydney	Wheelchair fencing	Men's sabre team
Gold	So Wa-wai	(Greece) 2004 Athens	Athletics	Men's 200m T36
Gold	Leung Yuk-wing	(Greece) 2004 Athens	Boccia	Mixed individual BC4
Gold	Lau Yan-chi; Leung Yuk-wing	(Greece) 2004 Athens	Boccia	Mixed pair BC4
Gold	Fung Ying-ki	(Greece) 2004 Athens	Wheelchair fencing	Men's foil individual A
Gold	Hui Charn-hung	(Greece) 2004 Athens	Wheelchair fencing	Men's foil individual B
Gold	Hui Charn-hung; Fung Ying-ki; Chan Kam-yoi; Tai Yan-yun	(Greece) 2004 Athens	Wheelchair fencing	Men's sabre team open
Gold	Yu Chui-yee	(Greece) 2004 Athens	Wheelchair fencing	Women's épée individual A
Gold	Yu Chui-yee; Wong Kit-mui; Fan Pui-shan; Chan Yui-chong	(Greece) 2004 Athens	Wheelchair fencing	Women's épée team open
Gold	Yu Chui-yee	(Greece) 2004 Athens	Wheelchair fencing	Women's foil individual A
Gold	Chan Yui-chong	(Greece) 2004 Athens	Wheelchair fencing	Women's foil individual B
Gold	Yu Chui-yee; Wong Kit-mui; Fan Pui-shan; Chan Yui-chong	(Greece) 2004 Athens	Wheelchair fencing	Women's foil team open
Silver	So Wa-wai	(Greece) 2004 Athens	Athletics	Men's 100m T36
Silver	So Wa-wai	(Greece) 2004 Athens	Athletics	Men's 400m T36
Silver	Hui Charn-hung; Fung Ying-ki; Chan Kam-loi; Kwong Wai-ip	(Greece) 2004 Athens	Wheelchair fencing	Men's foil team open
Silver	Hui Charn-hung	(Greece) 2004 Athens	Wheelchair fencing	Men's sabre individual B
Silver	Fan Pui-shan	(Greece) 2004 Athens	Wheelchair fencing	Women's épée individual A
Silver	Chan Yui-chong	(Greece) 2004 Athens	Wheelchair fencing	Women's épée individual B
Silver	Fan Pui-shan	(Greece) 2004 Athens	Wheelchair fencing	Women's foil individual A
Bronze	Kwong Wai-ip	(Greece) 2004 Athens	Wheelchair fencing	Men's épée individual A
Gold	So Wa-wai	(China) 2008 Beijing	Athletics	Men's 200m T36
Gold	Karen Kwok Hoi-ying	(China) 2008 Beijing	Boccia	Mixed individual BC2
Gold	Chan Yui-chong	(China) 2008 Beijing	Wheelchair fencing	Women's individual foil B
Gold	Chan Yui-chong	(China) 2008 Beijing	Wheelchair fencing	Women's individual épée B
Gold	Yu Chui-yee	(China) 2008 Beijing	Wheelchair fencing	Women's individual foil A
Silver	Leung Yuk-wing	(China) 2008 Beijing	Boccia	Mixed individual BC4
Silver	Hui Charn-hung	(China) 2008 Beijing	Wheelchair fencing	Men's individual sabre B
Silver	Yu Chui-yee	(China) 2008 Beijing	Wheelchair fencing	Women's individual épée B
Bronze	So Wa-wai	(China) 2008 Beijing	Athletics	Men's 100m T36
Bronze	Fan Pui-shan	(China) 2008 Beijing	Wheelchair fencing	Women's individual épée A
Bronze	Fan Pui-shan	(China) 2008 Beijing	Wheelchair fencing	Women's individual foil A
Gold	Wong Ka-man	(United Kingdom) 2012 London	Table tennis	Women's individual C11
Gold	Yu Chui-yee	(United Kingdom) 2012 London	Wheelchair fencing	Women's individual foil A
Gold	Yu Chui-yee	(United Kingdom) 2012 London	Wheelchair fencing	Women's individual épée A
Silver	So Wa-wai	(United Kingdom) 2012 London	Athletics	Men's 200m T36
Silver	Yeung Chi-ka	(United Kingdom) 2012 London	Table tennis	Women's individual C11
Silver	Tam Chik-sum	(United Kingdom) 2012 London	Table tennis	Men's individual épée B
Bronze	Au Kai-lun	(United Kingdom) 2012 London	Swimming	Men's 100m backstroke S14
Bronze	Leung Shu-hang	(United Kingdom) 2012 London	Swimming	Women's 100m breaststroke SB14
Bronze	Chan Wing-kin	(United Kingdom) 2012 London	Wheelchair fencing	Men's individual sabre A
Bronze	Chan Yui-chong	(United Kingdom) 2012 London	Wheelchair fencing	Women's individual épée B
Bronze	Chan Wing-kin; Chung Ting-ching; Wong Tang-tat	(United Kingdom) 2012 London	Wheelchair fencing	Men's team foil open
Bronze	Chan Yui-chong; Fan Pui-shan; Yu Chui-yee	(United Kingdom) 2012 London	Wheelchair fencing	Women's team épée open
Gold	Leung Yuk-wing	(Brazil) 2016 Rio de Janeiro	Boccia	Mixed individual BC4
Gold	Tang Wai-lok	(Brazil) 2016 Rio de Janeiro	Swimming	Men's 200m freestyle S14
Silver	Yu Chui-yee	(Brazil) 2016 Rio de Janeiro	Wheelchair fencing	Women's individual foil A
Silver	Chan Yui-chong; Justine Charissa Ng; Yu Chui-yee	(Brazil) 2016 Rio de Janeiro	Wheelchair fencing	Women's team épée
Bronze	Ng Mui-wui	(Brazil) 2016 Rio de Janeiro	Table tennis	Women's individual C11
Bronze	Chan Yui-chong	(Brazil) 2016 Rio de Janeiro	Wheelchair fencing	Women's individual épée B
Silver	Leung Yuk-wing; Vivian Lau Wai-yan; Wong Kwan-hang	(Japan) 2020 Tokyo	Boccia	Mixed pairs BC4
Silver	Chu Man-kai	(Japan) 2020 Tokyo	Badminton	Men's singles SH6
Bronze	Wong Ting-ting	(Japan) 2020 Tokyo	Table tennis	Women's individual C11
Bronze	Leung Yuk-wing	(Japan) 2020 Tokyo	Boccia	Mixed individual BC4
Bronze	Chan Ho-yuen	(Japan) 2020 Tokyo	Badminton	Men's singles WH2
Gold	John Loung	(France) 2024 Paris	Boccia	Men's individual BC1
Gold	Ho Yuen Kei	(France) 2024 Paris	Boccia	Women's individual BC3
Gold	Tse Tak Wah; Ho Yuen Kei	(France) 2024 Paris	Boccia	Mixed pairs BC3
Silver	Chan Yui-lam	(France) 2024 Paris	Swimming	Women's 100m butterfly S14
Silver	Cheung Yuen	(France) 2024 Paris	Boccia	Women's individual BC4
Silver	Chan Ho Yuen	(France) 2024 Paris	Badminton	Men's singles WH2
Silver	Leung Yuk Wing; Cheung Yuen	(France) 2024 Paris	Boccia	Mixed pairs BC4
Bronze	Ng Cheuk Yan	(France) 2024 Paris	Swimming	Women's 100m breaststroke SB6

== See also ==
- Hong Kong at the Olympics
