= Table tennis at the 2016 Summer Paralympics – Women's individual – Class 11 =

Table tennis at the XV Paralympic Games
- Venue: Riocentro Pavilion 3
- Dates: 8–12 September 2016
- Competitors: 6 from 4 nations

Medalists
| 1st place, gold medalist(s) | | Natalia Kosmina | Ukraine |
| 2nd place, silver medalist(s) | | Krystyna Siemieniecka | Poland |
| 3rd place, bronze medalist(s) | | Ng Mui Hui | Hong Kong |

The women's individual table tennis – Class 11 tournament at the 2016 Summer Paralympics in Rio de Janeiro took place during 8–12 September 2016 at Riocentro Pavilion 3. This class was for athletes with intellectual impairment.

In the preliminary stage, athletes competed in two groups of three. Winners and runners-up of each group qualified to the semifinals.

== Results ==
Semifinals
A1 | Natalia Kosmina (UKR) | 4 | 10 | 11 | 11 | 11
B2 | Ng Mui Hui (HKG) | 11 | 12 | 7 | 4 | 9
A2 | Wong Ka Man (HKG) | 11 | 9 | 9 | 15
B1 | Krystyna Siemieniecka (POL) | 9 | 11 | 11 | 17

Final
A1 | Natalia Kosmina (UKR) | 11 | 11 | 11
B1 | Krystyna Siemieniecka (POL) | 7 | 6 | 5
Bronze-medal match
B2 | Ng Mui Hui (HKG) | 15 | 16 | 11
A2 | Wong Ka Man (HKG) | 13 | 14 | 8

=== Preliminary round ===
| Qualified for the semifinals |

==== Group A ====
| Seed | Athlete | Won | Lost | Points diff |
|---|---|---|---|---|
| 1 | Natalia Kosmina (UKR) | 2 | 0 | |
| 6 | Wong Ka Man (HKG) | 1 | 1 | |
| 3 | Dorota Nowacka (POL) | 0 | 2 | |

| Natalia Kosmina (UKR) | 6 | 11 | 11 | 9 | 11 |
| Wong Ka Man (HKG) | 11 | 8 | 6 | 11 | 3 |

| Natalia Kosmina (UKR) | 12 | 11 | 13 |
| Dorota Nowacka (POL) | 10 | 5 | 11 |

| Wong Ka Man (HKG) | 17 | 9 | 5 | 11 | 13 |
| Dorota Nowacka (POL) | 15 | 11 | 11 | 6 | 11 |

==== Group B ====
| Seed | Athlete | Won | Lost | Points diff |
|---|---|---|---|---|
| 2 | Krystyna Siemieniecka (POL) | 2 | 0 | |
| 4 | Ng Mui Wui (HKG) | 1 | 1 | |
| 5 | Maki Ito (JPN) | 0 | 2 | |

| Krystyna Siemieniecka (POL) | 11 | 11 | 11 |
| Maki Ito (JPN) | 7 | 6 | 5 |

| Krystyna Siemieniecka (POL) | 9 | 11 | 3 | 13 | 11 |
| Ng Mui Wui (HKG) | 11 | 8 | 11 | 11 | 6 |

| Ng Mui Wui (HKG) | 7 | 12 | 11 | 14 |
| Maki Ito (JPN) | 11 | 10 | 3 | 12 |
