= Hong Kong at the 1996 Summer Paralympics =

- IPC code: HKG
- NPC: Hong Kong Sports Association for the Physically Disabled

in Atlanta
- Competitors: 25 (20 men and 5 women)
- Medals Ranked 27th: Gold 5 Silver 5 Bronze 5 Total 15

Summer Paralympics appearances (overview)
- 1972; 1976; 1980; 1984; 1988; 1992; 1996; 2000; 2004; 2008; 2012; 2016; 2020; 2024

25 athletes (20 men and 5 women) from Hong Kong competed at the 1996 Summer Paralympics in Atlanta, United States.

== Medallists ==
Medal	Name	Sport	Event
Gold	Shing Chung Chan; Kwok Pang Chao; Yiu Cheung Cheung; Wa Wai So	Athletics	Men's 4 × 100 m relay T34-37
Gold	Wai Leung Cheung	Wheelchair fencing	Men's épée individual A
Gold	Wai Leung Cheung; Wai Ip Kwong; Yan Yun Tai; Man Fui Chui	Wheelchair fencing	Men's épée team
Gold	Wai Leung Cheung	Wheelchair fencing	Men's foil individual A
Gold	Kam Loi Chan; Wai Leung Cheung; Wai Ip Kwong; Sze Kit Chan	Wheelchair fencing	Men's foil team
Silver	Lai Tang	Lawn bowls	Women's singles LB7/8
Silver	Kam Shing Kwong	Table tennis	Men's singles 5
Silver	Pui Yi Wong	Table tennis	Women's open 1–5
Silver	Yuet Wah Fung; Pui Yi Wong	Table tennis	Women's teams 3–5
Silver	Man Fai Chan; Sze Kit Chan; Yan Yun Tai; Kam Loi Chan	Wheelchair fencing	Men's sabre team
Bronze	Yiu Cheung Cheung	Athletics	Men's 400m T36
Bronze	Lun Chiu	Lawn bowls	Men's singles LB3-5
Bronze	Yuet Wah Fung	Table tennis	Women's open 1–5
Bronze	Kam Loi Chan	Wheelchair fencing	Men's foil individual A
Bronze	Yan Yun Tai	Wheelchair fencing	Men's sabre individual A

== See also ==
- Hong Kong at the Paralympics
- Hong Kong at the 1996 Summer Olympics
