= Hong Kong at the 2000 Summer Paralympics =

- IPC code: HKG
- NPC: Hong Kong Sports Association for the Physically Disabled

in Sydney
- Competitors: 28
- Medals Ranked 21st: Gold 8 Silver 3 Bronze 7 Total 18

Summer Paralympics appearances (overview)
- 1972; 1976; 1980; 1984; 1988; 1992; 1996; 2000; 2004; 2008; 2012; 2016; 2020; 2024

28 athletes represented Hong Kong Special Administrative Region at the 2000 Summer Paralympics.

== Medal table ==
Medal	Name	Sport	Event
Gold	Wa Wai So	Athletics	Men's 100m T36
Gold	Wa Wai So	Athletics	Men's 200m T36
Gold	Wa Wai So	Athletics	Men's 400m T36
Gold	Wai Ling Lai	Table tennis	Women's singles 11
Gold	Ying Ki Fung	Wheelchair fencing	Men's foil individual A
Gold	Charn Hung Hui	Wheelchair fencing	Men's foil individual B
Gold	Kam Loi Chan; Ying Ki Fung; Charn Hung Hui; Wai Ip Kwong	Wheelchair fencing	Men's foil team
Gold	Ying Ki Fung	Wheelchair fencing	Men's sabre individual A
Silver	Ka Yan Tsang	Athletics	Women's long jump F20
Silver	Ting Ching Chung	Wheelchair fencing	Men's épée individual B
Silver	Ting Ching Chung	Wheelchair fencing	Men's foil individual B
Bronze	Wa Wai So; Kwok Pang Chao; Shing Chung Chan; Yiu Cheung Cheung	Athletics	Men's 4 × 100 m relay T38
Bronze	Shing Chung Chan; Kwok Pang Chao; Wa Wai So; Yiu Cheung Cheung	Athletics	Men's 4 × 400 m relay T38
Bronze	Chun Lai Yu	Athletics	Women's 100m T36
Bronze	Chun Lai Yu	Athletics	Women's 200m T36
Bronze	Chun Lai Yu	Athletics	Women's 400m T36
Bronze	Wai Ip Kwong; Yan Yun Tai; Ting Ching Chung	Wheelchair fencing	Men's épée team
Bronze	Kam Loi Chan; Charn Hung Hui; Yan Yun Tai; Ying Ki Fung	Wheelchair fencing	Men's sabre team

== See also ==
- Hong Kong at the 2000 Summer Olympics
- Hong Kong at the Paralympics

== Bibliography ==
- International Paralympic Committee (2000). "Appendix C: Athlete Numbers - By Delegation". Sydney 2000 Paralympic Games Post Games Report. Sydney.
