= Swimming at the 2016 Summer Paralympics – Men's 100 metre backstroke S11 =

Men's 100 metre backstroke S11 at the XV Paralympic Games
- Venue: Olympic Aquatics Stadium
- Dates: 9 September 2016
- Competitors: 13 from 10 nations

Medalists
1st place, gold medalist(s)		Dmytro Zalevskyi	Ukraine
2nd place, silver medalist(s)		Wojciech Makowski	Poland
2nd place, silver medalist(s)		Bradley Snyder	United States

The Men's 100 metre backstroke S11 event at the 2016 Paralympic Games took place on 9 September 2016, at the Olympic Aquatics Stadium. Two heats were held. The swimmers with the eight fastest times advanced to the final.

== Heats ==
=== Heat 1 ===
10:23 9 September 2016:

Rank	Lane	Name	Nationality	Time	Notes
1	4	Wojciech Makowski	Poland	1:09.40	Q
2	2	Bradley Snyder	United States	1:10.44	Q
3	5	Viktor Smyrnov	Ukraine	1:11.36	Q
4	3	Chenquan Lou	China	1:11.64	Q
5	6	Hendri Herbst	South Africa	1:14.44	
6	7	Sergio Zayas	Argentina	1:17.75	

=== Heat 2 ===
10:28 9 September 2016:

Rank	Lane	Name	Nationality	Time	Notes
1	3	Jeremy McClure	Australia	1:09.79	Q
2	5	Bozun Yang	China	1:10.40	Q
3	4	Dmytro Zalevskyi	Ukraine	1:10.84	Q
4	6	Oleksandr Mashchenko	Ukraine	1:13.69	Q
5	7	Hryhory Zudzilau	Belarus	1:14.39	
6	2	Miroslav Smrcka	Czech Republic	1:14.75	
7	1	Leider Lemus Rojas	Colombia	1:25.29	

== Final ==
19:11 9 September 2016:

Rank	Lane	Name	Nationality	Time	Notes
1st place, gold medalist(s)	2	Dmytro Zalevskyi	Ukraine	1:06.66	WR
2nd place, silver medalist(s)	4	Wojciech Makowski	Poland	1:08.28	
2nd place, silver medalist(s)	6	Bradley Snyder	United States	1:08.28	
4	7	Viktor Smyrnov	Ukraine	1:08.55	
5	5	Jeremy McClure	Australia	1:09.11	
6	3	Bozun Yang	China	1:09.89	
7	1	Chenquan Lou	China	1:12.20	
8	8	Oleksandr Mashchenko	Ukraine	1:15.85	
