= Hong Kong at the 1984 Summer Paralympics =

- IPC code: HKG
- NPC: Hong Kong Sports Association for the Physically Disabled

in Stoke Mandeville/New York
- Competitors: 25
- Flag bearer: Kenny Lau
- Medals Ranked 27th: Gold 3 Silver 5 Bronze 9 Total 17

Summer Paralympics appearances (overview)
- 1972; 1976; 1980; 1984; 1988; 1992; 1996; 2000; 2004; 2008; 2012; 2016; 2020; 2024

Hong Kong competed at the 1984 Summer Paralympics in Stoke Mandeville, Great Britain and New York City, United States. 25 competitors from Hong Kong won 17 medals including 3 gold, 5 silver and 9 bronze and finished 27th in the medal table.

== See also ==
- Hong Kong at the Paralympics
- Hong Kong at the 1984 Summer Olympics
