= Hong Kong at the 1992 Summer Paralympics =

- IPC code: HKG
- NPC: Hong Kong Sports Association for the Physically Disabled

in Barcelona
- Competitors: 21
- Medals Ranked 33rd: Gold 3 Silver 4 Bronze 4 Total 11

Summer Paralympics appearances (overview)
- 1972; 1976; 1980; 1984; 1988; 1992; 1996; 2000; 2004; 2008; 2012; 2016; 2020; 2024

Hong Kong competed at the 1992 Summer Paralympics in Barcelona, Spain. 21 competitors from Hong Kong won 11 medals, 3 gold, 4 silver and 4 bronze and finished 28th in the medal table.

== See also ==
- Hong Kong at the Paralympics
- Hong Kong at the 1992 Summer Olympics
