= Wojciech Makowski =

Polish Paralympic swimmer

Personal information
- Born: 19 February 1992 (age 34)

Sport
- Country: Poland
- Sport: Paralympic swimming
- Disability: Vision impairment (legally blind)
- Disability class: S11
Medal record
Men's para swimming
Representing Poland
Paralympic Games
Silver medal – second place	2016 Rio de Janeiro	100 m backstroke S11
European Championships
Silver medal – second place	2018 Dublin	100 m backstroke S11
Silver medal – second place	2018 Dublin	100 m freestyle S11
Bronze medal – third place	2018 Dublin	50 m freestyle S11

Wojciech Makowski (born 19 February 1992) is a Polish Paralympic swimmer. He represented Poland at the 2016 Summer Paralympics held in Rio de Janeiro, Brazil and he won the silver medal in the men's 100 metre backstroke S11 event. He also competed at the 2020 Summer Paralympics held in Tokyo, Japan.

At the 2018 World Para Swimming European Championships held in Dublin, Ireland, he won the silver medals in the men's 100 metres backstroke S11 and men's 100 metres freestyle S11 events. He also won the bronze medal in the men's 50 metres freestyle S11 event.
