= Hong Kong at the 1980 Summer Paralympics =

- IPC code: HKG
- NPC: Hong Kong Sports Association for the Physically Disabled

in Arnhem
- Competitors: 11
- Medals Ranked 35th: Gold 0 Silver 1 Bronze 2 Total 3

Summer Paralympics appearances (overview)
- 1972; 1976; 1980; 1984; 1988; 1992; 1996; 2000; 2004; 2008; 2012; 2016; 2020; 2024

Hong Kong competed at the 1980 Summer Paralympics in Arnhem, Netherlands. 11 competitors from Hong Kong won 3 medals, 1 silver and 2 bronze, and finished joint 35th in the medal table with The Bahamas.

== See also ==
- Hong Kong at the Paralympics
