= Hong Kong at the 1988 Summer Paralympics =

- IPC code: HKG
- NPC: Hong Kong Sports Association for the Physically Disabled

in Seoul
- Competitors: 42
- Medals Ranked 42nd: Gold 0 Silver 2 Bronze 7 Total 9

Summer Paralympics appearances (overview)
- 1972; 1976; 1980; 1984; 1988; 1992; 1996; 2000; 2004; 2008; 2012; 2016; 2020; 2024

Hong Kong competed at the 1988 Summer Paralympics in Seoul, South Korea. 42 competitors from Hong Kong won 9 medals including 2 silver and 7 bronze and finished 42nd in the medal table.

== See also ==
- Hong Kong at the Paralympics
- Hong Kong at the 1988 Summer Olympics
