= Boccia at the 2024 Summer Paralympics – Women's individual BC4 =

Boccia – Women's individual BC4 at the XVII Paralympic Games
- Venue: South Paris Arena
- Date: 29 August - 2 September 2024
- Competitors: 16 from 15 nations

Medalists
1st place, gold medalist(s)		Lin Ximei	China
2nd place, silver medalist(s)		Cheung Yuen	Hong Kong
3rd place, bronze medalist(s)		Leidy Chica	Colombia

The women's individual BC4 boccia event at the 2024 Summer Paralympics will be contested between 29 August and 2 September 2024 at the South Paris Arena.

The event structure begins with pool stages. The top two players from each of four pools then enter into the single-elimination stage, with the losing semifinalists playing off for bronze.

== Classification ==
The BC4 classification is described as follows:

BC4M/F – Players in this class have severe locomotor dysfunction of all four extremities as well as poor trunk control. They can demonstrate sufficient dexterity to throw the ball onto the court. Players are not eligible for assistance.

== Results ==
=== Pool stages ===
The pool stage will be played between 29 and 31 August 2024. The top two players in each pool will qualify to the elimination rounds.

Pool A

Pos	Player	Pld	W	D	L	PF	PA	PD	Pts	Qualification	(Colombia)	(Greece)	(Croatia)	(Spain)
1	Leidy Chica (COL)	3	3	0	0	23	6	+17	6	Qualification for quarterfinal	—	10–3	9–1	4–2
2	Chrysi Morfi Metzou (GRE)	3	2	0	1	15	14	+1	4	Qualification for quarterfinal	3–10	—	5–4	7–0
3	Anamaria Arambasic (CRO)	3	1	0	2	14	14	0	2	Eliminated	1–9	4–5	—	9–0
4	Sara Aller Mayo (ESP)	3	0	0	3	2	20	−18	0	Eliminated	2–4	0–7	0–9	—

Updated to match(es) played on 21 July 2024. Source: Paris 2024

Pool B

Pos	Player	Pld	W	D	L	PF	PA	PD	Pts	Qualification	(Malaysia)	(Canada)	(Egypt)	(Ukraine)
1	Noor Mat Salim (MAS)	3	3	0	0	22	11	+11	6	Qualification for quarterfinal	—	3–2	11–3	8–6
2	Alison Levine (CAN)	3	2	0	1	11	9	+2	4	Qualification for quarterfinal	2–3	—	4–3	5–3
3	Hanaa Elfar (EGY)	3	1	0	2	14	16	−2	2	Eliminated	3–11	3–4	—	8–1
4	Natallia Konenko (UKR)	3	0	0	3	10	21	−11	0	Eliminated	6–8	3–5	1–8	—

Updated to match(es) played on 21 July 2024. Source: Paris 2024

Pool C

Pos	Player	Pld	W	D	L	PF	PA	PD	Pts	Qualification	(Hong Kong)	(China)	(Thailand)	(Slovakia)
1	Cheung Yuen (HKG)	3	3	0	0	17	7	+10	6	Qualification for quarterfinal	—	6–2	5–2	6–3
2	Lin Ximei (CHN)	3	2	0	1	22	8	+14	4	Qualification for quarterfinal	2–6	—	6–2	14–0
3	Nuanchan Phonsila (THA)	3	1	0	2	15	11	+4	2	Eliminated	2–5	2–6	—	11–0
4	Kristina Vozarova (SVK)	3	0	0	3	3	31	−28	0	Eliminated	3–6	0–14	0–11	—

Updated to match(es) played on 21 July 2024. Source: Paris 2024

Pool D

Pos	Player	Pld	W	D	L	PF	PA	PD	Pts	Qualification	(Portugal)	(Brazil)	(Hungary)	(Germany)
1	Carla Oliveira (POR)	3	2	0	1	11	9	+2	4	Qualification for quarterfinal	—	4–2	5–0	2–7
2	Laissa Polyana Teixeira (BRA)	3	2	0	1	10	9	+1	4	Qualification for quarterfinal	2–4	—	4–3	4–2
3	Alexandra Szabo (HUN)	3	1	0	2	9	9	0	2	Eliminated	0–5	3–4	—	6–0
4	Anita Raguwaran (GER)	3	1	0	2	9	12	−3	2	Eliminated	7–2	2–4	0–6	—

Updated to match(es) played on 21 July 2024. Source: Paris 2024

=== Elimination stage ===
The final stage (or knockout stage) will be played between 31 August and 2 September.

Quarter-finals
31 August, South Paris Arena
Leidy Chica (COL)	3
Alison Levine (CAN)	2
31 August, South Paris Arena
Carla Oliveira (POR)	2
Lin Ximei (CHN)	5
31 August, South Paris Arena
Noor Mat Salim (MAS)	7
Morfi M (GRE)	0
31 August, South Paris Arena
Cheung Yuen (HKG)	4
LP Teixeira (BRA)	1

Semi-finals
1 September, South Paris Arena
Leidy Chica (COL)	3
Lin Ximei (CHN)	4
1 September, South Paris Arena
Noor Mat Salim (MAS)	0
Cheung Yuen (HKG)	7

Final
2 September, South Paris Arena
Lin Ximei (CHN)	5
Cheung Yuen (HKG)	1
Bronze medal
1 September, South Paris Arena
Leidy Chica (COL)	7
Noor Mat Salim (MAS)	1

Elimination Matches

Quarterfinals

Match QF1:
Player/End	1	2	3	4	Result	Report
Alison Levine (CAN)	1	1	0	0	2	Report
Leidy Chica (COL)	0	0	2	1	3	Report
Match QF2:
Player/End	1	2	3	4	Result	Report
Noor Mat Salim (MAS)	2	3	1	1	7	Report
Morfi M (GRE)	0	0	0	0	0	Report
Match QF3:
Player/End	1	2	3	4	Result	Report
Cheung Yuen (HKG)	2	1	0	1	4	Report
LP Teixeira (BRA)	0	0	1	0	1	Report
Match QF4:
Player/End	1	2	3	4	Result	Report
Lin Ximei (CHN)	1	3	1	0	5	Report
Carla Oliveira (POR)	1	0	0	1	2	Report

Semifinals

Match SF1:
Player/End	1	2	3	4	Result	Report
Lin Ximei (CHN)	0	1	1	2	4	Report
Leidy Chica (COL)	3	0	0	0	3	Report
Match SF2:
Player/End	1	2	3	4	Result	Report
Noor Mat Salim (MAS)	0	0	0	0	0	Report
Cheung Yuen (HKG)	2	1	3	1	7	Report

Finals

Bronze medal match:
Player/End	1	2	3	4	Result	Report
Noor Mat Salim (MAS)	0	0	0	1	1	Report
Leidy Chica (COL)	2	2	3	0	7	Report
Gold medal match:
Player/End	1	2	3	4	Result	Report
Lin Ximei (CHN)	1	1	3	0	5	Report
Cheung Yuen (HKG)	0	0	0	1	1	Report
