= Hong Kong at the 1976 Summer Paralympics =

- IPC code: HKG
- NPC: Hong Kong Sports Association for the Physically Disabled

in Toronto
- Competitors: 11
- Medals Ranked 31st: Gold 0 Silver 1 Bronze 2 Total 3

Summer Paralympics appearances (overview)
- 1972; 1976; 1980; 1984; 1988; 1992; 1996; 2000; 2004; 2008; 2012; 2016; 2020; 2024

Hong Kong sent a delegation to compete at the 1976 Summer Paralympics in Toronto, Ontario, Canada. Its athletes finished thirty-first in the overall medal count.

== See also ==
- 1976 Summer Paralympics
- Hong Kong at the 1976 Summer Olympics
