= Lin Ximei =

Chinese boccia player (born 1995)

Personal information
- Born: 28 February 1995 (age 31) Jieyang, China

Sport
- Country: China
- Sport: Boccia
- Disability class: BC4
Medal record
Women's boccia
Representing China
Paralympic Games
Gold medal – first place	2024 Paris	Individual BC4
Asian Para Games
Gold medal – first place	2018 Jakarta	Individual BC4
Gold medal – first place	2018 Jakarta	Pairs BC4
Gold medal – first place	2022 Hangzhou	Individual BC4
Silver medal – second place	2022 Hangzhou	Pairs BC4
Bronze medal – third place	2014 Incheon	Pairs BC4

Lin Ximei (born 28 February 1995) is a Chinese boccia player. She competed at the 2024 Summer Paralympics, reaching the finals of the women's BC4 event. She won the first ever Paralympic Gold Medal in boccia for China.
