= Judith Rodríguez Menéndez =

Spanish paralympic wheelchair fencer

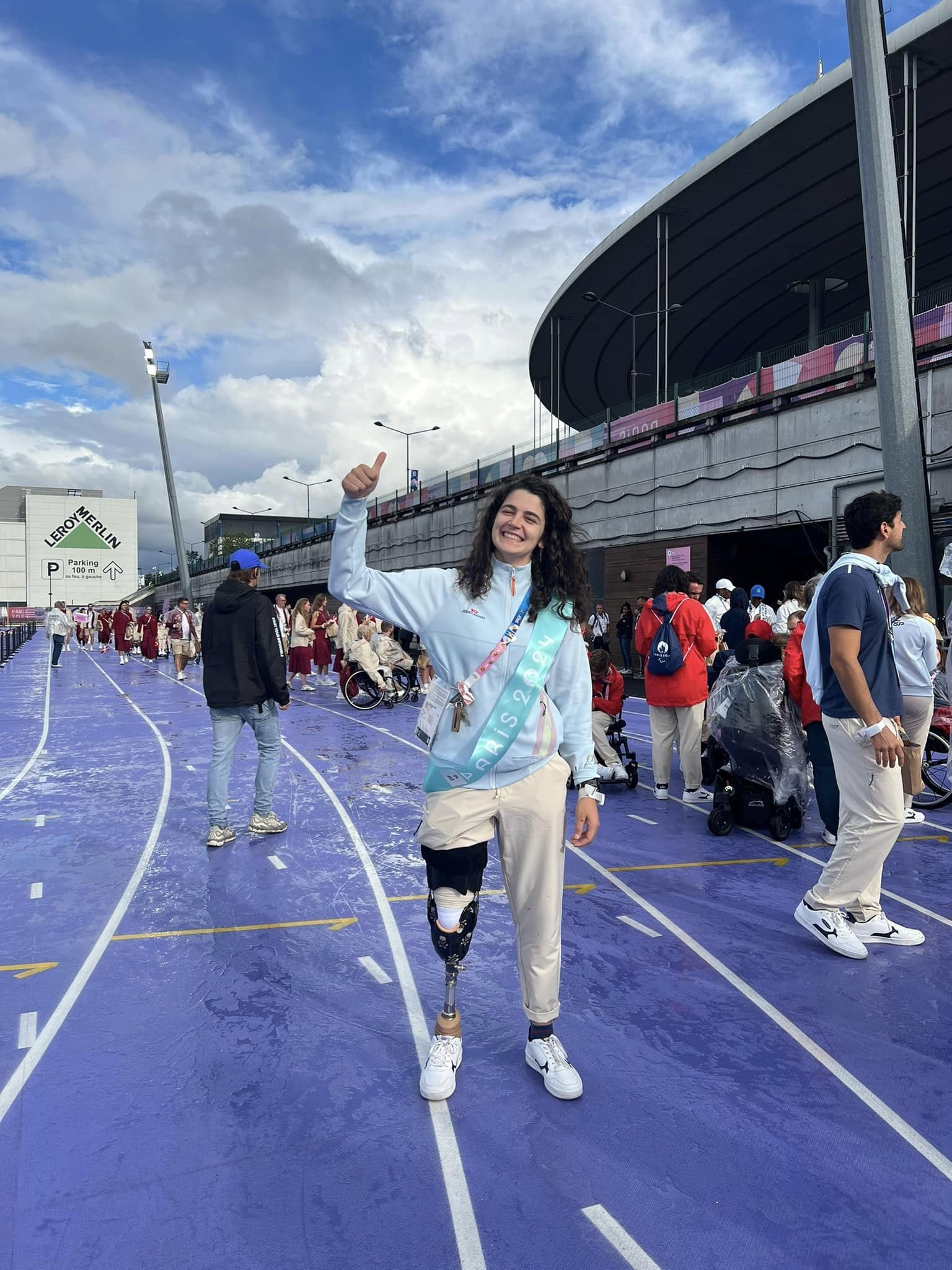

Personal information
- Born: 11 September 1995 (age 30)

Sport
- Country: Spain
- Sport: Wheelchair fencing
Medal record
Wheelchair fencing
Representing Spain
Paralympic Games
Bronze medal – third place	2024 Paris	Foil A
European Championships
Bronze medal – third place	2024 Paris	Épée

Judith Rodríguez Menéndez (born 11 September 1995) is a Spanish paralympic wheelchair fencer. She competed at the 2024 Summer Paralympics, winning the bronze medal in the women's foil A event.
