= Léa Ferney =

French para table tennis player

Personal information
- Born: 21 June 2004 (age 22) Dijon, France

Sport
- Country: France
- Sport: Para table tennis
- Disability class: C11
Medal record
Para table tennis
Representing France
Paralympic Games
Silver medal – second place	2020 Tokyo	Singles C11
European Championships
Bronze medal – third place	2019 Helsingborg	Teams C11

Léa Ferney (born 21 June 2004) is a French para table tennis player. She won the silver medal in the women's C11 event at the 2020 Summer Paralympics held in Tokyo, Japan.
