= Elena Prokofeva =

Russian para table tennis player

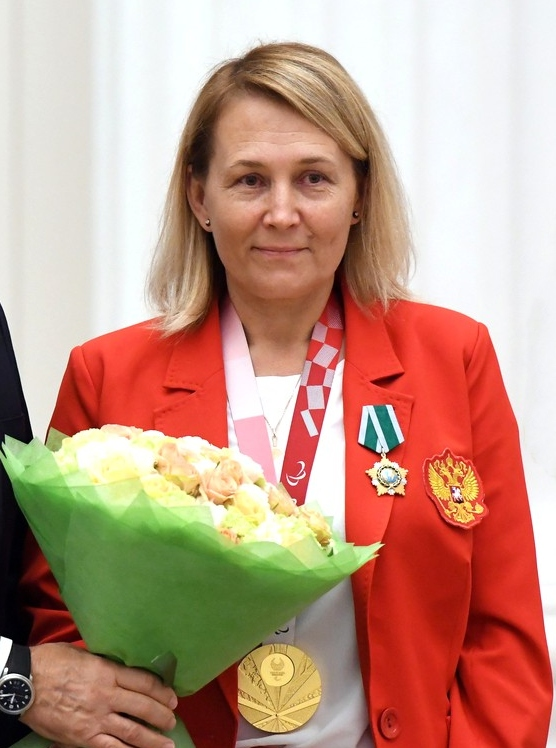
- Prokofeva in 2021

Personal information
- Full name: Elena Nikolyaevna Prokofeva
- Born: 13 March 1971 (age 55) Dushanbe, Tajik SSR, Soviet Union
- Height: 162 cm (5 ft 4 in)

Sport
- Sport: Table tennis
- Disability class: C11
- Highest ranking: 1st (1 June 2014)
- Current ranking: 1st (1 July 2021)
Medal record
Representing Neutral Paralympic Athletes
Paralympic Games
Silver medal – second place	2024 Paris	Singles C11
Representing RPC
Paralympic Games
Gold medal – first place	2020 Tokyo	Individual
World Championships
Gold medal – first place	2018 Lasko	Individual
World Team Championships
Gold medal – first place	2017 Bratislava	Team
World Team Championships
Gold medal – first place	2019 Helsingbord	Individual
Gold medal – first place	2019 Helsingbord	Team
Gold medal – first place	2015 Vejle	Individual
Silver medal – second place	2017 Lasko	Individual

Elena Nikolayevna Prokofeva (Russian: Елена Николаевна Прокофьева; born 13 March 1971) is a Russian para table tennis player. She won the gold medal in the women's C11 event at the 2020 Summer Paralympics held in Tokyo, Japan. She is a multitude World and European champion.

Prokofeva has a daughter, Katerina, and two sons, Valery and Lev.
