= Maki Ito (table tennis) =

Japanese para table tennis player

Personal information
- Born: 8 September 1984 (age 41) Yokohama, Japan

Sport
- Sport: Table tennis
Medal record
Representing Japan
Paralympic Games
Bronze medal – third place	2020 Tokyo	Singles C11
World Championships
Gold medal – first place	2014 Beijing	Teams C11
Bronze medal – third place	2022 Granada	Singles C11
Asian Para Games
Silver medal – second place	2022 Hangzhou	Doubles C22

Maki Ito (伊藤 槙紀, Ito Maki, born 8 September 1984) is a Japanese para table tennis player. She won one of the bronze medals in the women's C11 event at the 2020 Summer Paralympics held in Tokyo, Japan.

She also competed in the women's C11 event at the 2016 Summer Paralympics held in Rio de Janeiro, Brazil.
