= Hong Kong at the 2016 Summer Paralympics =

- IPC code: HKG
- NPC: Hong Kong Paralympic Committee & Sports Association for the Physically Disabled
- Website: www.hkparalympic.org

in Rio de Janeiro
- Competitors: 24 in 8 sports
- Medals Ranked 40th: Gold 2 Silver 2 Bronze 2 Total 6

Summer Paralympics appearances (overview)
- 1972; 1976; 1980; 1984; 1988; 1992; 1996; 2000; 2004; 2008; 2012; 2016; 2020; 2024

Hong Kong competed at the 2016 Summer Paralympics in Rio de Janeiro, Brazil, from 7 September to 18 September 2016.

== Boccia ==
Eight athletes competed for Hong Kong in boccia competitions at the 2016 Paralympics. Leung Yuk Wing won gold in the Individual BC4.

== Equestrian ==
Through the Para Equestrian Individual Ranking List Allocation method, the country earned a pair of slots at the Rio Games for their two highest ranked equestrian competitors. These slots were irrespective of class ranking.

== Shooting ==
The third opportunity for direct qualification for shooters to the Rio Paralympics took place at the 2015 IPC IPC Shooting World Cup in Sydney, Australia. At this competition, Yan Wo Wong earned a qualifying spot for their country in the P1- Men's 10m Air Pistol SH1 event.

== See also ==
- Hong Kong at the 2016 Summer Olympics
