= Krystyna Łysiak =

Polish para table tennis player

Personal information
- Full name: Krystyna Maria Łysiak
- Born: Krystyna Maria Siemieniecka; 11 March 1979 (age 47) Drezdenko, Poland
- Home town: Nowa Sól, Poland
- Height: 158 cm (5 ft 2 in)

Sport
- Country: Poland
- Sport: Para table tennis
- Disability: Intellectual impairment
- Disability class: C11
- Club: UKS 10
- Coached by: Jacek Łysiak
Medal record
Para table tennis
Representing Poland
Paralympic Games
Silver medal – second place	2016 Rio de Janeiro	Women's singles C11
World Championships
Silver medal – second place	2014 Beijing	Women's teams C11
Silver medal – second place	2018 Laško	Women's singles C11
Bronze medal – third place	1998 Paris	Women's singles C11
Bronze medal – third place	2014 Beijing	Women's singles C11
European Championships
Gold medal – first place	2013 Lignano	Women's teams C11
Silver medal – second place	1999 Piešťany	Women's doubles C11
Bronze medal – third place	2013 Lignano	Women's singles C11
Bronze medal – third place	2017 Laško	Women's singles C11

Krystyna Maria Łysiak (née Siemieniecka, born 11 March 1979) is a Polish para table tennis player. She is married to her coach Jacek Łysiak and they have a daughter.
