= Ng Cheuk-yan =

Hong Kong paralympic swimmer

Personal information
- Born: 19 March 2010 (age 16)

Sport
- Country: Hong Kong
- Sport: Para swimming
Medal record
Para swimming
Representing Hong Kong
Paralympic Games
Bronze medal – third place	2024 Paris	100 m breaststroke SB6
World Championships
Silver medal – second place	2023 Manchester	100 m breaststroke SB6
Asian Para Games
Bronze medal – third place	2022 Hangzhou	100 m backstroke S6

Ng Cheuk-yan (born 19 March 2010) is a Hong Kong paralympic swimmer. She competed at the 2024 Summer Paralympics, winning the bronze medal in the women's 100 m breaststroke SB6 event.
