= Cheung Yuen =

Hong Kong boccia player (born 1999)

Personal information
- Born: 15 May 1999 (age 27)

Sport
- Country: Hong Kong
- Sport: Boccia
- Disability class: BC4
Medal record
Women's boccia
Representing Hong Kong
Paralympic Games
| Silver medal – second place | 2024 Paris | Individual BC4 |
| Silver medal – second place | 2024 Paris | Pairs BC4 |
Asian Para Games
| Silver medal – second place | 2022 Hangzhou | Pairs BC4 |
| Bronze medal – third place | 2022 Hangzhou | Individual BC4 |

Cheung Yuen (Chinese: 張沅; born 15 May 1999) is a Hong Kong boccia player. She competed at the 2024 Summer Paralympics, reaching the finals of the women's individual BC4 event.

She is the number one ranked Asian boccia player in her event.
