= Natalia Kosmina =

Ukrainian para table tennis player

Personal information
- Born: 8 November 1982 (age 43) Donetsk, Ukrainian SSR, Soviet Union
- Height: 156 cm (5 ft 1 in)

Sport
- Country: Ukraine
- Sport: Para table tennis
- Disability: Intellectual impairment
- Disability class: C11
Medal record
Para table tennis
Representing Ukraine
Paralympic Games
Gold medal – first place	2016 Rio de Janeiro	Women's singles C11
World Championships
Bronze medal – third place	2014 Beijing	Women's singles C11
European Championships
Gold medal – first place	2013 Lignano	Women's singles C11
Gold medal – first place	2017 Lasko	Women's singles C11
Silver medal – second place	2015 Vejle	Women's singles C11

Natalia Kosmina or Natalya Kosmina (born 8 November 1982) is a Ukrainian para table tennis player.
