= Wong Ting Ting =

Hong Kong para table tennis player

Personal information
- Born: 11 September 2003 (age 22)

Sport
- Sport: Table tennis
Medal record
Representing Hong Kong
Paralympic Games
Bronze medal – third place	2020 Tokyo	Singles C11
World Championships
Gold medal – first place	2022 Granada	Doubles C22
Asian Para Games
Gold medal – first place	2022 Hangzhou	Doubles C22
Silver medal – second place	2022 Hangzhou	Singles C11

Wong Ting-ting (Chinese: 王婷莛; born 11 September 2003) is a Hong Kong para table tennis player. She won a bronze medal in the women's C11 event at the 2020 Summer Paralympics held in Tokyo, Japan.
