= Ng Mui Wui =

Hong Kong para table tennis player

Personal information
- Born: March 31, 1997 (age 29) British Hong Kong
- Height: 164 cm (5 ft 5 in)
- Weight: 42 kg (93 lb)

Sport
- Sport: Table tennis
- Playing style: Right-handed shakehand grip
- Disability class: 11
- Highest ranking: 2 (September 2019)
- Current ranking: 2
Medal record
Women's para table tennis
Representing Hong Kong
Summer Paralympics
Bronze medal – third place	2016 Rio de Janeiro	Singles C11
World Championships
Silver medal – second place	2017 Bratislava	Teams C11
Bronze medal – third place	2018 Lasko	Singles C11
Asian Para Games
Gold medal – first place	2018 Jakarta	Singles C11
Gold medal – first place	2018 Jakarta	Teams C11
Silver medal – second place	2014 Incheon	Singles C11
Bronze medal – third place	2022 Hangzhou	Singles C11
Asian Championships
Gold medal – first place	2017 Beijing	Teams C11
Gold medal – first place	2019 Taichung	Singles C11
Silver medal – second place	2015 Amman	Singles C11
Silver medal – second place	2019 Taichung	Teams C11
Bronze medal – third place	2013 Beijing	Singles C11
Bronze medal – third place	2017 Beijing	Singles C11

Ng Mui Wui
- Traditional Chinese: 吳玫薈
- Simplified Chinese: 吴玫荟
Transcriptions
Standard Mandarin
- Hanyu Pinyin: Wú Méihuì
Yue: Cantonese
- Jyutping: Ng^{4} Mui^{4} Wui^{6}

Ng Mui Wui (Chinese: 吳玫薈, born 31 March 1997) is a para table tennis player from Hong Kong. She won a bronze at the women's Class 11 singles event held at the 2016 Summer Paralympics.

Ng has congenital intellectual disability.

== Career ==
Ng's first table tennis tournament was the 2011 Asian and Oceanic Championships. She won a silver medal at the 2014 Asian Para Games's individual Class 11 event. Later, she went on to represent Hong Kong at the 2016 Summer Paralympics held in Rio de Janeiro, where she advanced until the semifinals of Women's individual – Class 11 event but lost to Natalia Kosmina of Ukraine. In the bronze medal match she defeated Wong Ka Man of her own country and secured the first medal for Hong Kong at the 2016 Paralympics.

In 2017 she won gold metals at the 4th Taichung Open for the Disabled's women's TT11 category and the team event of Asian Para Table Tennis Championships. At the World Para Team Championships held the same year, her team secured the second position.
