= Shing Chung Chan =

Hong Kong Paralympic athlete

Medal record

Men's para-athletics

Representing Hong Kong

Paralympic Games
Gold medal – first place	1996 Atlanta	4x100 m relay C8
Silver medal – second place	1992 Barcelona	100 m C8
Bronze medal – third place	1988 Seoul	4x100 m relay C7-8
Bronze medal – third place	2000 Sydney	4x100 m relay T38
Bronze medal – third place	2000 Sydney	4x400 m relay T38

Chan Shing-chung (Chinese: 陳成忠) is a paralympic athlete from Hong Kong competing mainly in category C8 sprint events.

Chan competed in four Paralympics, winning five medals, four of them in relay events. His first games were in 1988 where he competed in the 200m and long jump and won a bronze medal in the 4 × 100 m relay. The 1992 Summer Paralympics saw Chan win a silver medal in the 100m individual event and raced in the 4 × 100 m relay. The 1996 Summer Paralympics led to Chan's only gold medal and a world record as part of the Hong Kong 4 × 100 m relay team, he again also raced in the 100m and 200m. His final games in 2000 saw him win 2 bronze medals as part of the Hong Kong 4 × 100 m and 4 × 400 m teams as well as racing in the 100m.
