= Cerebral palsy sport classification =

Disability sport classification system

Cerebral palsy sport classification is a classification system used by sports that include people with cerebral palsy (CP) with different degrees of severity to compete fairly against each other and against others with different types of disabilities. In general, Cerebral Palsy-International Sports and Recreation Association (CP-ISRA) serves as the body in charge of classification for cerebral palsy sport, though some sports have their own classification systems which apply to CP sportspeople.

People with cerebral palsy were first included at the Paralympic Games in 1980 in Arnhem, the Netherlands at time when there were only four CP classes. In the next few years, a CP sports specific international organization, CP-ISRA, was founded and took over the role of managing classification. The system then started to move away from a medical based classification system to a functional classification system. This was not without controversy as it represented a move to allow people with different types of disabilities to compete against each other, and there was pushback as a result. A major overhaul of classification took place during the 2000s. At the same, individual sports began to develop their own sport specific classification systems.

The classification system developed by the CP-ISRA includes eight classes: CP1, CP2, CP3, CP4, CP5, CP6, CP7 and CP8. These classes can be generally grouped into upper wheelchair, wheelchair and ambulatory classes. CP1 is the class for upper wheelchair, while CP2, CP3 and CP4 are general wheelchair classes. CP5, CP6, CP7 and CP8 are ambulatory classes. Other sports either use a version of this system, have a completely different system, or have a system with one class for which members of certain CP classes are eligible to participate. The process for classification is sport specific. It generally includes a medical exam, observation in training and observation in competition.

CP sports classification, and disability sport classification, is not a system without criticism. Complaints about it include that it creates unfairness when CP sportspeople have to compete against sportspeople with other types of disabilities, that it discourages participation of people with the most severe forms of CP, and that changes to the system can leave sportspeople unprepared.

== Purpose ==
The purpose of classification is to ensure fair competition between sportspeople with different severities of disabilities. The system is designed to measure functional ability, not skill. The classification system does not use a performance based one as such a system would be unfair.

== Governance ==
The CP sport classification system is generally governed by Cerebral Palsy-International Sports and Recreation Association (CP-ISRA). The organization was founded in 1978 to assist sportspeople who have cerebral palsy, traumatic brain injury, stroke, or a related condition. Classification is also handled on the national level by CP sport organizations. In the United States, it is the United States Cerebral Palsy Association.

The CP-ISRA, and its national member organizations, have historically been charged with maintaining the classification system for a number of sports including athletics, swimming, cycling and cross-country. Some sports have their own classifying process and bodies charged with governing classification. International Federation of CP Football serves as the classifying body for 7-a-side football. International Paralympic Table Tennis Committee, a subcommittee of the International Table Tennis Federation, is in charge of classification for table tennis. The World Taekwondo Federation's Para-Taekwondo Classification code serves as the governing document for para-Taekwondo.

== Disability types and definitions ==
The cerebral palsy sport classification system is designed for people with several types of paralysis and movement including quadriplegia, triplegia, diplegia, hemiplegia, monoplegia, spasticity, athetosis, and ataxia. Quadriplegia impacts the whole body, including the head, torso and all the limbs. Triplegia impacts three of the four limbs. Diplegia is when there is greater functional use of the lower limbs than the upper limbs. Hemiplegia, is a type of paralysis that effects one side of the body. Monoplegia is a condition that impacts only one limb. Spasticity limits muscle movement as a result of tightness in muscle.

Athetosis is a condition that has resulted in damage to the basal ganglia. People with this have involuntary movements in their limbs, with these involuntary movements being worse when the person is under stress. Athetosis may co-present with Dysarthria. Ataxia involves a lack of coordination, and an inability to engage in rapid, fine motor skills. People with this condition may have balance issues and difficulty with trunk control. Ataxia is often a result of damage to the cerebellum.

== History ==
People with cerebral palsy were first included at the Paralympic Games in 1980 in Arnhem, the Netherlands. While four classes were in existence at the time, only the two highest functioning classes were included on the program. The four classes were defined around coordination, types of cerebral palsy and functional abilities.

Originally part of a broader organization, CP-ISRA became an independent organization in 1981. National level CP and CP sport organizations were recognized at the same time. In 1982, the classification system was expanded from four classes to eight classes. It included four ambulatory classes and four wheelchair classes, and used a functional classification system.

In 1983, classification for cerebral palsy competitors was undertaken by the CP-ISRA for a variety of sports including boccia and athletics. The classification was based upon the system designed for field athletics events but used in a wider variety of sports including archery and boccia. The system was originally designed with five classifications. The system was designed after consulting medical experts from two other international sport organizations, ISOD and ICPS. They defined cerebral palsy as a non-progressive brain legion that results in impairment. People with cerebral palsy or non-progressive brain damage were eligible for classification by them. The organisation also dealt with classification for people with similar impairments. For their classification system, people with spina bifida were not eligible unless they had medical evidence of loco-motor dysfunction. People with cerebral palsy and epilepsy were eligible provided the condition did not interfere with their ability to compete. People who had strokes were eligible for classification following medical clearance. Competitors with multiple sclerosis, muscular dystrophy and arthrogryposis were not eligible for classification by CP-ISRA, but were eligible for classification by International Sports Organisation for the Disabled for the Games of Les Autres.

At the 1984 Summer Paralympics, the first cerebral palsy only sports were added to the program with the inclusion of CP football and boccia.

By the 1990s, disability sport had moved away from medical based classification systems and had started using functional based systems. This action coincided with the actions of 1992 that saw the International Paralympic Committee formally take over governance of a number of disability sports. At the same time, there was an effort to bring down the number of classifications used in disability sport by combining them. Jack Weinstein had some objections to this at that time, claiming wheelchair athletes might be put at a disadvantage when competing against people with cerebral palsy who used a wheelchair less often. This effort went hand-in-hand with efforts to bring the total number of medals down as the Games were facing criticism that in many cases, people appeared to just have to turn up to win a medal. This went counter to efforts to develop the Games into a true elite sporting competition.

At the 1992 Summer Paralympics, cerebral palsy disability types were eligible to participate for the first time, with classification being run through CP-ISRA. They used a system based largely on disability type, with some functional aspects taken into account for some sports. Swimming, athletics and table tennis used a medical based classification system for the Barcelona Games. The 1996 Summer Paralympics in Atlanta were the first ones where swimming was fully integrated based on functional disability, with classification no longer separated into classes based on the four disability types of vision impaired, cerebral palsy, amputee, and wheelchair sport. Countries no longer had multiple national swimming teams based on disability type but instead had one mixed disability national team. At the end of 1996, the CP-ISRA had 22 international classifiers. The first classification rules for table tennis published by the International Table Tennis Federation were published in September 1996.

Because of issues in objectively identifying functionality that plagued the post Barcelona Games, the IPC unveiled plans to develop a new classification system in 2003. This classification system went into effect in 2007, and defined ten different disability types that were eligible to participate on the Paralympic level. It required that classification be sport specific, and served two roles. The first was that it determined eligibility to participate in the sport and that it created specific groups of sportspeople who were eligible to participate and in which class. The IPC left it up to International Federations to develop their own classification systems within this framework, with the specification that their classification systems use an evidence based approach developed through research.

In 2009, IPC Athletics classification rules were changed for athletics as a result of recommendations that were approved by the board. These changes impact CP athletes. The CP-ISRA released an updated version of their classification system in 2009.

When World Taekwondo Federation initially launched the para-side of their sport, they used the classification system of CP-ISRA but moved to their own code in consultation with the CP-ISRA in 2015.

== Classes ==
The classification system developed by the CP-ISRA includes eight classes: CP1, CP2, CP3, CP4, CP5, CP6, CP7 and CP8. These classes can be generally grouped into upper wheelchair, wheelchair and ambulatory classes. CP1 is the class for upper wheelchair, while CP2, CP3 and CP4 are general wheelchair classes. CP5, CP6, CP7 and CP8 are ambulatory classes.

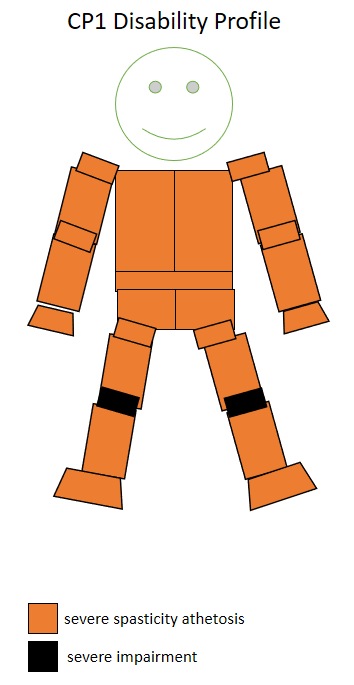
Disability type for CP1 classified sportspeople

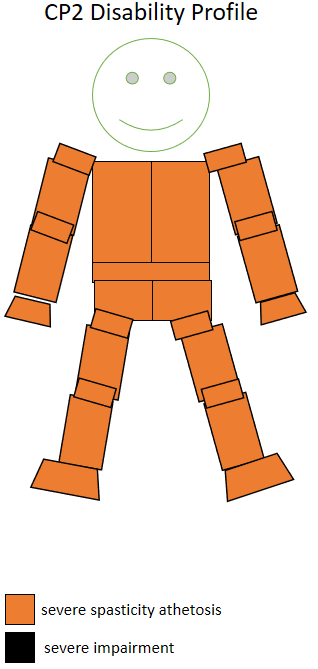
Disability type for CP2 classified sportspeople

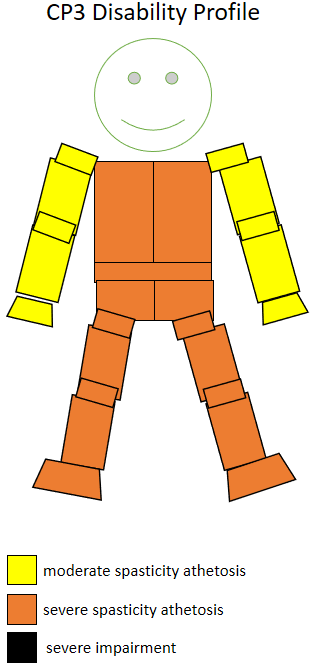
Disability type for CP3 classified sportspeople

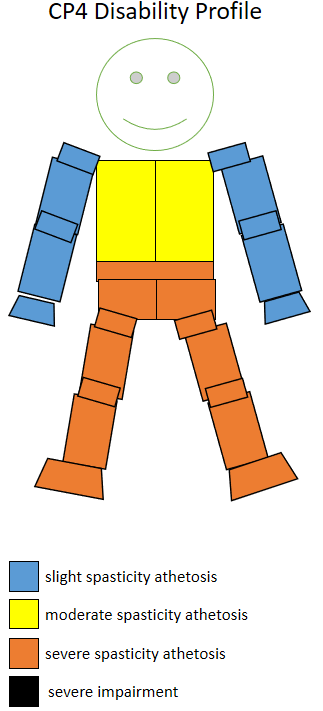
Disability type for CP4 classified sportspeople

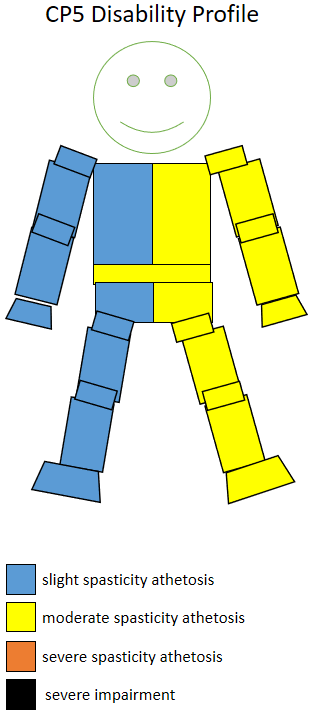
Disability type for CP5 classified sportspeople

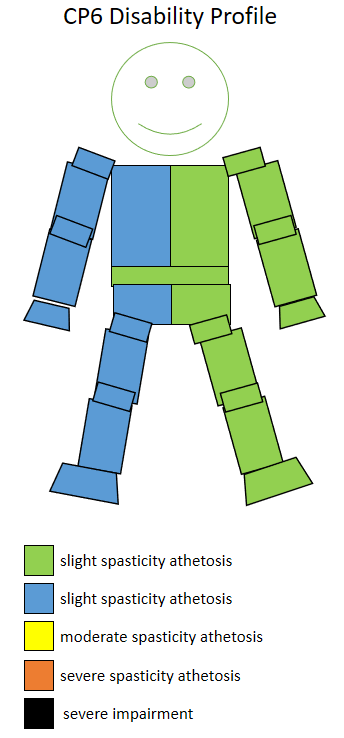
Disability type for CP6 classified sportspeople

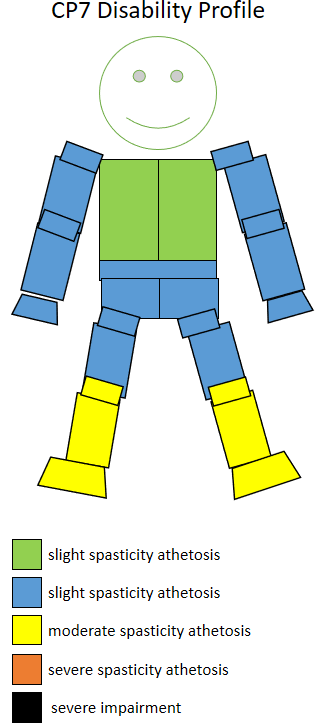
Disability type for CP7 classified sportspeople

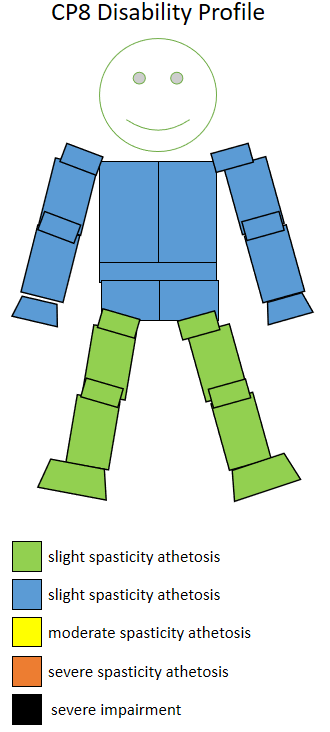
Disability type for CP8 classified sportspeople

Some sports have historically used these categories without much sport specific classification done. This is the case for CP football, which uses and is only open to CP5, CP6, CP7 and CP8 classes. CP football sometimes uses different classification names, with FT5 mirroring CP5, FT6 mirroring CP6, FT7 mirroring CP7 and FT8 mirroring CP8. Rules for the sport require that at least one CP5 or CP6 player be on the field at any given moment, and if a team is unable to do so, they play down a man.

Different sports utilize different classes, with some of these systems mirroring the classes used by the CP-ISRA, while at the same time allowing athletes to compete against people with similar functional disabilities. Athletics have one such system, with classes T31 to T38 mirror CP1 to CP8 for track events, and F31 to F38 for field events. This is not always the case though, and some CP athletes may be grouped in T and F classes in the 50s for people who use wheelchairs. CP2 athletes may be grouped in F52 or F53. CP3 athletes may be classified as F53, F54, or F55. CP4 athletes may be classified as F54, F55 or F56. CP5 athletes may be classified as F56.

The classification utilized by the UCI does not mirror the system used by CP-ISRA. Instead, eligible classes include T1, T2, H1, C3, and C4. People with CP1, CP2, CP3 and CP4 are classified as T1 and use a tricycle. CP5 and CP6 competitors are eligible to compete in the bicycle class C3. CP7 and CP8 may compete on a bicycle in the C4 class. CP3 are eligible to compete in the handcycle H1 class.

Swimming also does not use CP-ISRA related classes. People with hemiplegic forms of cerebral palsy are classified as S8, S9 or S10 depending on the severity of the hemiplegia. Table tennis is the same, with classes being open to CP competitors but not using the CP-ISRA system as a guide for how to classify table tennis players. Classes 6, 7, 8 and 9 in table tennis are all available for people with cerebral palsy, with a sports specific classification process to determine which class they belong to often based more on arm and hand functionality than other sports.

Some sports like powerlifting do not have different classes. Rather, everyone competes in classes based on weight, with minimum and maximum disability requirements existing. The CP-ISRA classes of CP3, CP4, CP5, CP6, CP7 and CP8 are eligible to participate in powerlifting. Wheelchair curling is the same, with CP-ISRA classes of CP3, CP4 and CP5 all eligible to participate in the sport. Sledge hockey and wheelchair dance are similar, with the highest eligible class of participants being CP7. Standing volleyball, open to people with different types of disabilities, is also similar, but is limited to only to CP7 and CP8 competitors.

Class	Definition	Athletics	Boccia	Cycling	CP Football	Race Running	Rowing	Skiing	Swimming	Other sports	Ref
CP1	Use electric wheelchairs and are quadriplegic.	T31, F31	BC1, BC3	T1		RR1			S1, S2	Slalom: CP1	
CP2	Use electric wheelchairs and are quadriplegic. Have better upper body control when compared to CP1.	T32, F32, F51, F52, F53	BC1, BC2	T1		RR2			S2	Slalom: CP2	
CP3	Use wheelchairs on a daily basis though they may be ambulant with the use of assistive devices. Have issues with head movement and trunk function.	T33, F33, F53, F54, F55		T1, H1		RR2, RR3		LW10, LW11	S3, S4	Slalom: CP3	
CP4	Use wheelchairs on a daily basis though they may be ambulant with the use of assistive devices. Have fewer issues with head movement and trunk function.	T34, F34, F54, F55, F56		T1		RR3	AS	LW10, LW11, LW12	S4, S5	Slalom: CP4	
CP5	Greater functional control of their upper body, and are generally ambulant with the use of an assistive device. Quick movements can upset their balance.	T35, F35, F56		T2, C3	FT5	RR3	TA	LW1, LW3, LW3/2,LW4 LW9	S5, S6		
CP6	Ambulatory, and able to walk without the use of an assistive device. Their bodies are constantly in motion.	T36, F36		T2, C3	FT6	RR3 RR4		LW1, LW3 LW3/2, LW9	S7		
CP7	Able to walk, but may appear to have a limp as half their body is effected by cerebral palsy.	T37, F37		C4	FT7	RR4		LW9, LW9/1, LW9/2	S7, S8, S9, S10	Sitting volleyball: Grade A	
CP8	Least physically affected by their cerebral palsy, with their disability generally manifested as spasticity in at least one limb.	T38, F38		C4, C5	FT8		LTA	LW4, LW6/8, LW9, LW9/2	S8, S9, S10	Sitting volleyball: Grade A	

== Classification process ==
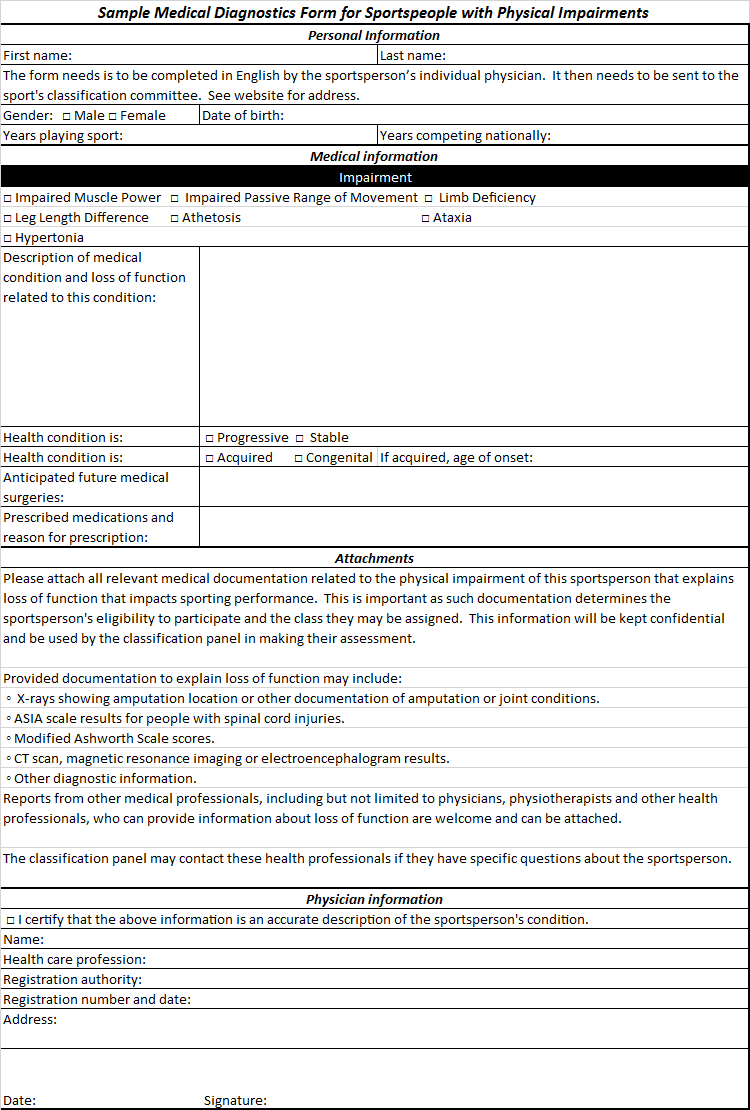
A sample medical classification form. Sportspeople would need some form of this sent to a classification panel.

The process for being classified is often sports specific. As a general rule, CP1 to CP4 sportspeople attend classification in a wheelchair. Failure to do so could result in them being classified as an ambulatory CP class competitor such as CP5 or CP6, or a related sport specific class.

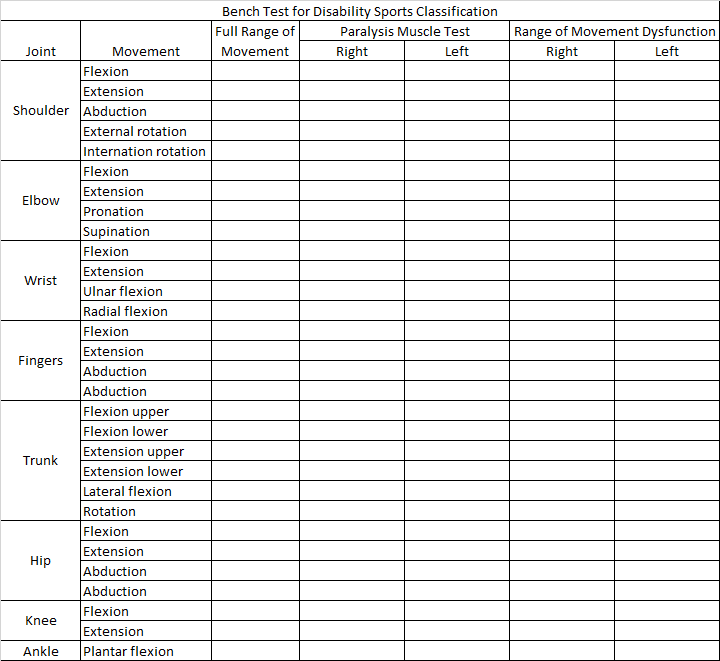
A standard bench press form used to for functional classification for wheelchair sportspeople.

One of the standard means of assessing functional classification is the bench test, which is used in swimming, lawn bowls and wheelchair fencing. Using the Adapted Research Council (MRC) measurements, muscle strength is tested using the bench press for a variety of disabilities a muscle being assessed on a scale of 1 to 5 for people with cerebral palsy and other issues with muscle spasticity. A 1 is for no functional movement of the muscle or where there is no motor coordination. A 2 is for normal muscle movement range not exceeding 25% or where the movement can only take place with great difficult and, even then, very slowly. A 3 is where normal muscle movement range does not exceed 50%. A 4 is when normal muscle movement range does not exceed 75% and or there is slight in-coordination of muscle movement. A 5 is for normal muscle movement.

Swimming functional classification generally has three components. The first is a bench press. The second is water test. The third is in competition observation. As part of the water test, swimmers are often required to demonstrate their swimming technique for all four strokes. They usually swim a distance of 25 meters for each stroke. They are also generally required to demonstrate how they enter the water and how they turn in the pool.

CP footballers are first required to go through national level classification before being eligible for international classification. The first stage of international classification involves a physical assessment. This may involve classifiers who are medical experts. The second stage involves observing the footballer practicing their sport specific skills in a non-competitive setting. The third stage involves classifiers observing the player in competition for at least 30 minutes. Following that, the classification panel then assigns the footballer to a class, which may also include "Not Eligible."

== Criticisms ==
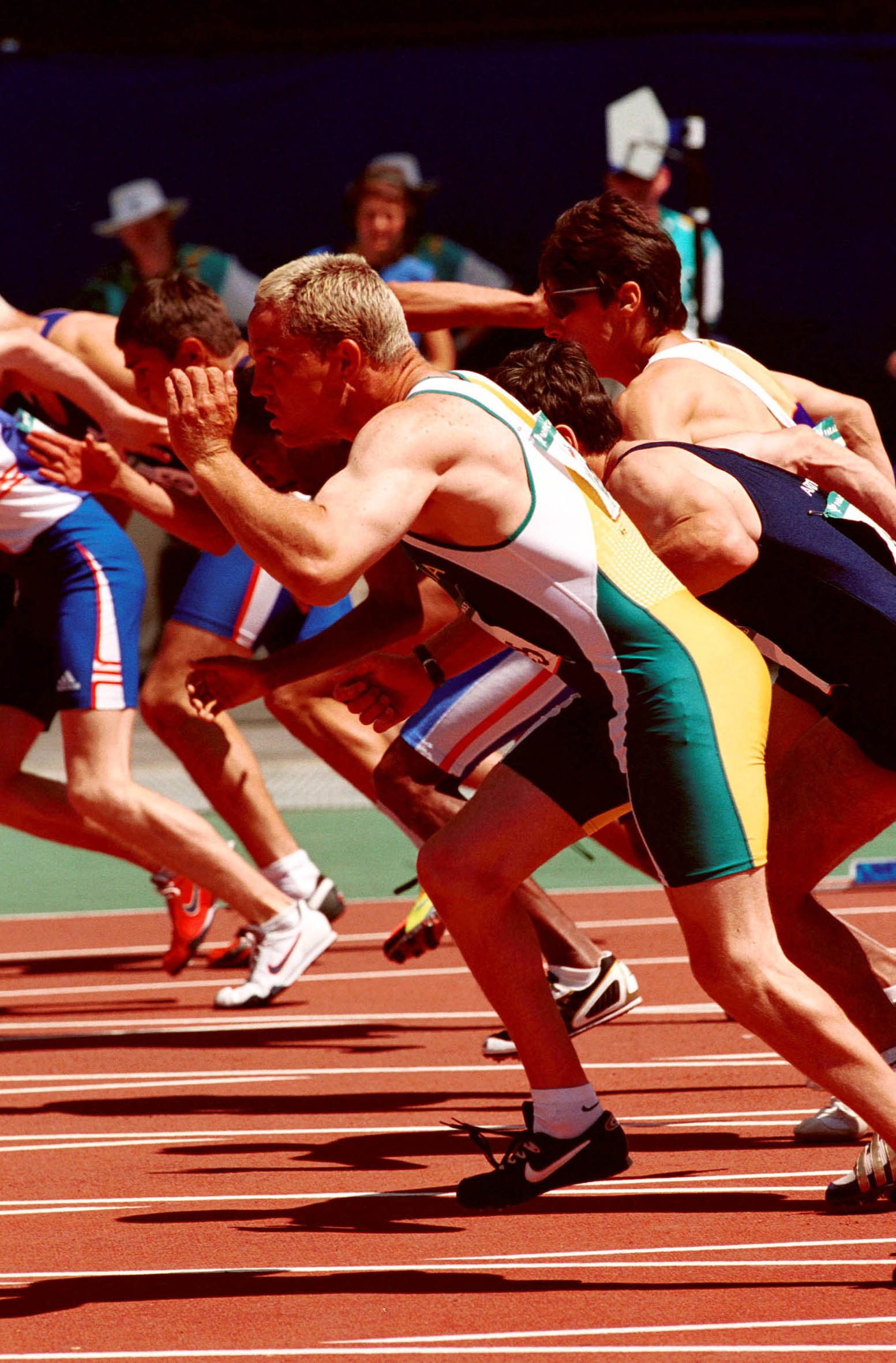
Hamish MacDonald at the 2000 Summer Paralympics in Sydney.

There have been some criticisms of the classification system when it allows people with cerebral palsy to compete against others who have different disabilities. In some cases, this criticism is because the result is making a sport less inclusive, with the example of wheelchair basketball being that CP2 and CP3 class competitors cannot play. In athletics, the combining of wheelchair class is seen as being detrimental to participation of men with CP in track events as they cannot get the same times as others with similar disabilities in their class.

Another criticism of the classification system in general, and one that is particularly relevant to CP sports given that its athletes make up the bulk of the most severely disabled ones, is that commercialization of the Paralympic movement has led to a reduction of classes in more popular sports for people with the most severe disabilities as these classes often have much higher support costs associated with them.

Changes to the classification process have left some athletes unprepared and unable to compete because events for their classes have been eliminated. One example of this involved Australian cerebral palsy athlete Hamish MacDonald who was unable to defend a gold at the 2000 Games because his classification was eliminated after the 1996 Summer Paralympics. This was not conveyed to well to athletes. Hamish went to the Court of Arbitration of Sport to argue he should be allowed to compete in a wheelchair class. While CAS sided with MacDonald, the IPC Medical Director Michael Riding, IPC Chief Wheelchair Classifier Mats Laverborne and Australian classifier John Bourke overrode this decision. The classification system has also been criticized by some past Paralympians as being a tool to control and define the body.

When it comes to integrated classification systems, where sportspeople with CP compete against those with other disabilities, one of the criticisms has been that the nature of CP is that greater exertion leads to decreased dexterity and fine motor movements. This puts competitors with CP at a disadvantage when competing against people with amputations who do not lose coordination as a result of exertion. This is particularly problematic in the case of swimming.
