= Paresi =

Paresi may refer to:

- Paresi language, an Arawakan language of Brazil
- Pareši, a village in Macedonia
- Andrew Paresi, British comedian, writer and musician

== See also ==
- Paresis, a medical condition
