= CP3 =

CP3 or CP-3 may refer to:

== People ==
- Chris Paul (born 1985), American basketball player in the NBA
- Candace Parker (born 1986), American basketball player in the WNBA

== Other uses ==
- CP3 (classification), a disability sport classification specific to cerebral palsy
- The Center for Prevention Programs and Partnerships, a division of the United States Department of Homeland Security
- Child's Play 3, a 1991 American horror film
- Chicago Pile-3, the world's first heavy water reactor
- Complex projective space ($\mathbb{CP}^3$), in mathematics
- Mercury-manganese star, a class of chemically peculiar stars
- CP3: an EEG electrode site according to the 10–20 system (EEG)
- Riviera MRT/LRT station, MRT station code CP3
