= Triplegia =

Paralysis of three limbs

Triplegia is a medical condition characterized by the paralysis of three limbs. While there is no typical pattern of involvement, it is usually associated with paralysis of both legs and one arm—but can also involve both arms and one leg. Triplegia can sometimes be considered a combination of hemiplegia (paralysis of arm and leg of one side of the body) overlaying diplegia (paralysis of both legs), or as quadriplegia (paralysis of four limbs) with less involvement in one extremity.

The condition is commonly associated with cerebral palsy, although conditions such as strokes can also lead to it. Triplegia has also been found to be due to an increase in intracranial pressure associated with hydrocephalus resulting from traumatic brain injury.

A similar condition is triparesis, in which a person has paresis in three limbs, meaning that the limbs are very weak, but not completely paralyzed.

In a case reported only due to its rarity, triplegia was reported following a surgical removal of the tonsils. An eight-year-old boy was sent to Willard Parker Hospital on August 12, 1929, and had been diagnosed with poliomyelitis. After an unrelated, and routine, tonsillectomy there was complete flaccid paralysis and loss of feeling in both the legs, right arm, and muscles in the trunk.
