= S2 (classification) =

Para-swimming classification

S2, SB1, SM2 are Para swimming classifications used for categorizing swimmers based on their level of disability. People in this class have limited use of their arms, and no or extremely limited use of their hands, legs and trunk. Swimmers in this class have a variety of different disabilities including cerebral palsy and amputations.

Swimmers in this class have a number of events they can participate in including the 50m and 100m Freestyle, 200m Freestyle, 50m Backstroke, 50m Butterfly, 50m Breaststroke and 150m Individual Medley events.

== Definition ==
Visualisation of functional mobility for a S2 competitor

This classification is for swimming. In the classification title, S represents Freestyle, Backstroke and Butterfly strokes. SB means breaststroke. SM means individual medley. Swimming classifications are on a gradient, with one being the most severely physically impaired to ten having the least amount of physical disability. Jane Buckley, writing for the Sporting Wheelies, describes the swimmers in this classification as being: "able to use their arms with no use of their hands, legs or trunk Or have severe coordination problems in four limbs. Similar disabilities to Class 1 but these athletes would have more propulsion by use of their arms or legs."

== Disability groups ==
This class includes people with several disability types include cerebral palsy, short stature and amputations.

=== Amputee ===
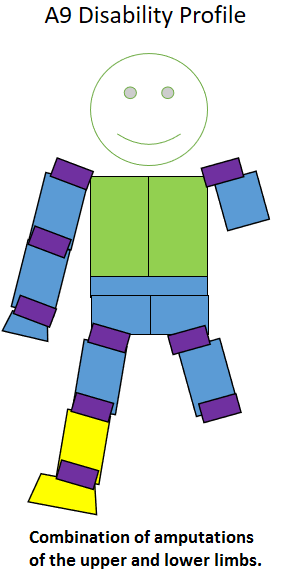
Type of amputation for an A9 classified sportsperson.

ISOD amputee A9 swimmers may be found in several classes. These include S2, S3, S4, S5 and S8. Prior to the 1990s, the A9 class was often grouped with other amputee classes in swimming competitions, including the Paralympic Games. Swimmers in this class have a similar stroke length and stroke rate to able bodied swimmers.

The nature of a person's amputations in this class can effect their physiology and sports performance. Because of the potential for balance issues related to having an amputation, during weight training, amputees are encouraged to use a spotter when lifting more than 15 pounds (6.8 kg). Lower limb amputations effect a person's energy cost for being mobile. To keep their oxygen consumption rate similar to people without lower limb amputations, they need to walk slower. Because they are missing a limb, amputees are more prone to overuse injuries in their remaining limbs. Common problems with intact upper limbs for people in this class include rotator cuffs tearing, shoulder impingement, epicondylitis and peripheral nerve entrapment.

=== Cerebral palsy ===
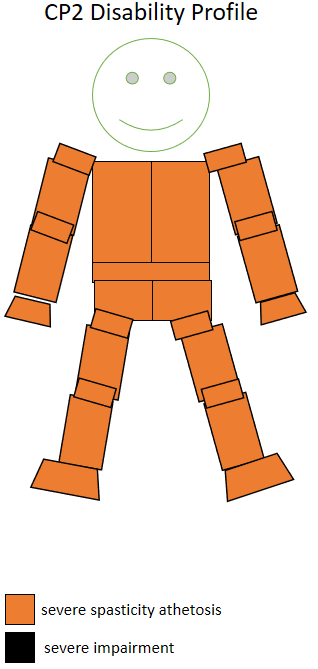
The spasticity athetosis level and location of a CP2 sportsperson.

One of the disability groups in this classification is swimmers with cerebral palsy, including CP1 and CP2 classified swimmers.

Some CP1 swimmers in this class require floaters to race. The use of such devices is not allowed in IPC sanctioned events, but is allowed in CP-ISRA sanctioned ones. CP1 swimmers tend to have a passive normalized drag in the range of 1.3 to 1.7. This puts them into the passive drag band of PDB1, and PDB3. CP1 sportspeople tend to use electric wheelchairs. They may have controlled shakes and twitches. They have severely limited of their trunk and limbs. When participating in sport, CP1 competitors tend to have low energy expenditure. This bodily activity can spike their metabolic rate.

CP2 swimmers tend to have a passive normalized drag in the range of 1.0 to 1.1. This puts them into the passive drag band of PDB4. CP2 swimmers tend to use electric wheelchairs. They may have controlled shakes and twitches. This bodily activity can spike their metabolic rate. They can operate a manual wheelchair but this is restricted because of motor control issues. Functional control issues effect all or most of their limbs. When participating in sport, CP2 competitors tend to have low energy expenditure. CP2 competitors have better upper body control when compared to CP1.

=== Short stature ===
SS2 swimmers may be found S1 and S5. Men in this class are 130 centimetres (51 in) tall or less, with an arm length equal to or less than 59 centimetres (23 in). When their standing height and arm length are added together, the distance is equal to or less than 180 centimetres (71 in). For women in this class, the same measurements are 125 centimetres (49 in), 57 centimetres (22 in) and 173 centimetres (68 in).

There are generally two types of syndromes that cause short stature. One is disproportionate limb size on a normal size torso. The second is proportionate, where they are generally small for their average age. There are a variety of causes including skeletal dysplasia, chondrodystrophy, and growth hormone deficiencies. Short stature can cause a number of other disabilities including eye problems, joint defects, joint dislocation or limited range of movement.

=== Spinal cord injuries ===
People with spinal cord injuries compete in this class, including F1, F2 sportspeople.

==== F1 ====
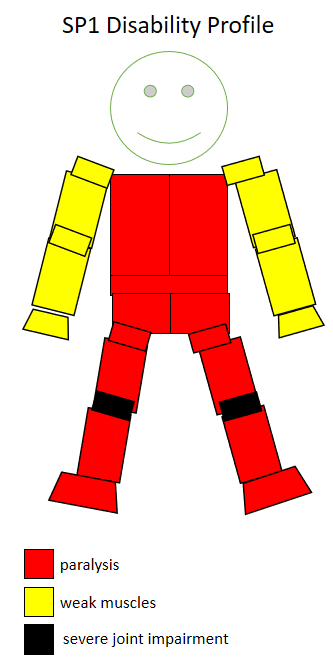
Functional profile of a wheelchair sportsperson in the F1 class.

This is wheelchair sport classification that corresponds to the neurological level C6. In the past, this class was known as 1A Complete. Disabled Sports USA defined the anatomical definition of this class in 2003 as, "Have functional elbow flexors and wrist dorsi-flexors. May have elbow extensors (up to power 3) but usually do not have wrist palmar flexors. May have shoulder weakness. Have no sitting balance." People with C4 lesions have head control, and limited respiratory endurance. People with C5 lesions have abduction of the arms, and flexion of the arm. People with C6 lesions have abduction and flexion of the arms, and wrist extension.

The location of lesions on different vertebrae tend to be associated with disability levels and functionality issues. People with C4 lesions can control electronic devices using a mouth controlled joystick. People with a lesion at C5 or C6 have an impairment that effects the use of their hands and lower arm. People with C5 can perform some actions with one of their arms, and can propel a wheelchair with modified rims that make it easier to do. People with C6 can have a weak grasp with their wrist. They can roll over in bed. They have some independence in that they can eat and groom themselves without assistance. They may also be able to transfer themselves to a wheelchair. In terms of motor functions, people in this class who are C4-C6 tetraplegics may have issues with their biceps, deltoids, rhomboids and rotor cuffs. They may have an absence of sensation in their hands, wrists and forearms. People in this class have a total respiratory capacity of 81% compared to people without a disability. The functional characteristics for this class at the 1990 Stoke Mandeville Games had this class scoring a 0 - 3 for triceps on the MRC scale, with severe weakness of the trunk and lower limbs.

People with spinal cord injuries in S2 tend to be tetraplegics with complete lesions below C6, or tetraplegics with complete lesions below C7 who have additional paralysis in their plexus or in one arm. These S2 swimmers have no hand or wrist flexion so are unable to catch water. Because of a lack of trunk control, they are unstable in the water and have hip drag. As they have no leg mobility, their legs drag. They normally swim the backstroke as they lack head control to breathe effectively for the freestyle. They start in the water, sometimes with assistance for initial propulsion.

For swimming with the most severe disabilities at the 1984 Summer Paralympics, floating devices and a swimming coach in the water swimming next to the Paralympic competitor were allowed. A study of was done comparing the performance of athletics competitors at the 1984 Summer Paralympics. It found there was little significant difference in performance times between women in 1A (SP1, SP2), 1B (SP3), and 1C (SP3, SP4) in the 25m breaststroke. It found there was little significant difference in performance times between women in 1A (SP1, SP2), 1B (SP3), and 1C (SP3, SP4) in the 25m backstroke. It found there was little significant difference in performance times between women in 1A (SP1, SP2), 1B (SP3), and 1C (SP3, SP4) in the 25m freestyle. It found there was little significant difference in performance times between men in 1A (SP1, SP2), 1B (SP3), and 1C (SP3, SP4) in the 25m backstroke. It found there was little significant difference in performance times between men in 1A (SP1, SP2), 1B (SP3), and 1C (SP3, SP4) in the 25m freestyle. It found there was little significant difference in performance times between men in 1A (SP1, SP2), and 1B (SP3) in the 25m breaststroke.

==== F2 ====
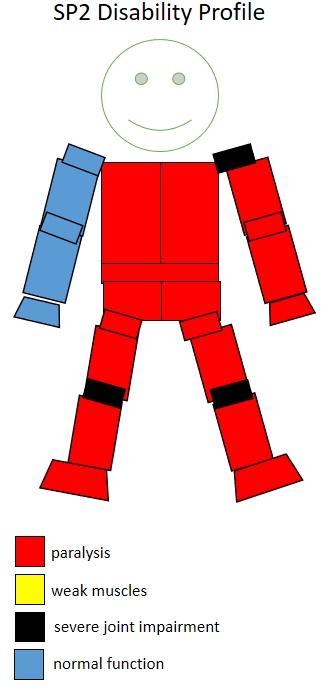
Functional profile of a wheelchair sportsperson in the F2 class.

This is wheelchair sport classification that corresponds to the neurological level C7. In the past, this class was known as 1B Complete, 1A Incomplete. The location of lesions on different vertebrae tend to be associated with disability levels and functionality issues. C7 is associated with elbow flexors. C8 is associated with finger flexors. Disabled Sports USA defined the anatomical definition of this class in 2003 as, ""Have functional elbow flexors and extensors, wrist dorsi-flexors and palmar flexors. Have good shoulder muscle function. May have some finger flexion and extension but not functional." People with lesions at C7 have stabilization and extension of the elbow and some extension of the wrist. People with a lesion at C7 have an impairment that effects the use of their hands and lower arm. They can use a wheelchair using their own power, and do everyday tasks like eating, dressing, and normal physical maintenance. People in this class have a total respiratory capacity of 79% compared to people without a disability.

Swimming classification is done based on a total points system, with a variety of functional and medical tests being used as part of a formula to assign a class. Part of this test involves the Adapted Medical Research Council (MRC) scale. For upper trunk extension, C8 complete are given 0 points.

Swimming classification is done based on a total points system, with a variety of functional and medical tests being used as part of a formula to assign a class. Part of this test involves the Adapted Medical Research Council (MRC) scale. For upper trunk extension, C8 complete are given 0 points.

People with spinal cord injuries in S2 tend to be tetraplegics with complete lesions below C6, or tetraplegics with complete lesions below C7 who have additional paralysis in their plexus or in one arm. These S2 swimmers have no hand or wrist flexion so are unable to catch water. Because of a lack of trunk control, they are unstable in the water and have hip drag. As they have no leg mobility, their legs drag. They normally swim the backstroke as they lack head control to breathe effectively for the freestyle. They start in the water, sometimes with assistance for initial propulsion.

For swimming with the most severe disabilities at the 1984 Summer Paralympics, floating devices and a swimming coach in the water swimming next to the Paralympic competitor were allowed. A study of was done comparing the performance of athletics competitors at the 1984 Summer Paralympics. It found there was little significant difference in performance times between women in 1A (SP1, SP2), 1B (SP3), and 1C (SP3, SP4) in the 25m breaststroke. It found there was little significant difference in performance times between women in 1A (SP1, SP2), 1B (SP3), and 1C (SP3, SP4) in the 25m backstroke. It found there was little significant difference in performance times between women in 1A (SP1, SP2), 1B (SP3), and 1C (SP3, SP4) in the 25m freestyle. It found there was little significant difference in performance times between men in 1A (SP1, SP2), 1B (SP3), and 1C (SP3, SP4) in the 25m backstroke. It found there was little significant difference in performance times between men in 1A (SP1, SP2), 1B (SP3), and 1C (SP3, SP4) in the 25m freestyle. It found there was little significant difference in performance times between men in 1A (SP1, SP2), and 1B (SP3) in the 25m breaststroke.

== History ==
The classification was created by the International Paralympic Committee. In 2003 the committee approved a plan which recommended the development of a universal classification code. The code was approved in 2007, and defines the "objective of classification as developing and implementing accurate, reliable and consistent sport focused classification systems", which are known as "evidence based, sport specific classification". In November 2015, they approved the revised classification code, which "aims to further develop evidence based, sport specific classification in all sports".

== Events ==
Swimmers in this class have a number of events they can participate in. They include the 50m and 100m Freestyle, 200m Freestyle, 50m Backstroke, 50m Butterfly, 50m Breaststroke and 150m Individual Medley events.

== At the Paralympic Games ==
For this classification, organisers of the Paralympic Games have the option of including the following events on the Paralympic programme: 50m and 100m Freestyle, 200m Freestyle, 50m Backstroke, 50m Butterfly, 50m Breaststroke and 150m Individual Medley events.

For the 2016 Summer Paralympics in Rio, the International Paralympic Committee had a zero classification at the Games policy. This policy was put into place in 2014, with the goal of avoiding last minute changes in classes that would negatively impact athlete training preparations. All competitors needed to be internationally classified with their classification status confirmed prior to the Games, with exceptions to this policy being dealt with on a case-by-case basis.

== Records ==
In the S2 50 m Freestyle Long Course, the men's world record is held by the American Curtis Lovejoy with a time of 01:00.11 and the women's world record is held by the Ukrainian Ganna Ielisavetska with a time of 01:07.15 in 2011. In the S2 100 m Freestyle Long Course, the men's world record is held by American Curtis Lovejoy and the women's world record is held by the Ukrainian Ganna Ielisavetska.

At the 2024 Summer Paralympics, Brazilian swimmer Gabriel Araújo broke the world record for the men's 150m SM2 classification twice in one day and went on to win three gold medals that year.

== Getting classified ==
Swimming classification for S2 swimmers generally has three components. The first is a bench press. The second is water test. The third is in competition observation. As part of the water test, swimmers are often required to demonstrate their swimming technique for all four strokes. They usually swim a distance of 25 meters for each stroke. They are also generally required to demonstrate how they enter the water and how they turn in the pool.

In Australia, to be classified in this category, athletes contact the Australian Paralympic Committee or their state swimming governing body. In the United States, classification is handled by the United States Paralympic Committee on a national level. The classification test has three components: "a bench test, a water test, observation during competition." American swimmers are assessed by four people: a medical classified, two general classified and a technical classifier.

== Competitors ==
Swimmers who have competed in this classification include Jim Anderson, Sara Carracelas, Iryna Sotska who all won medals in their class at the 2008 Paralympics. American swimmers who have been classified by the United States Paralympic Committee as being in this class include Nancy Anderson, Suzanne Collett and Curtis Lovejoy.
