= Boccia classification =

Disability sports classification system used for boccia

Boccia classification is the classification system governing boccia, a sport designed specifically for people with disabilities. Classification is handled by Cerebral Palsy International Sports and Recreation Association. There are four classifications for this sport. All four classes are eligible to compete at the Paralympic Games.

== Definition ==
Boccia classification at the Paralympic Games is the basis for determining who can compete in the sport, and within which class. It is used for the purposes of establishing fair competition. Entry is eligible to athletes with cerebral palsy or severe disabilities (such as muscular dystrophy, brain or spinal injury). There are four boccia classifications based upon functional ability. This sport has rules that were designed specifically with people with disabilities in mind.

== Governance ==
In 1983, the rules for this sport and approval for classification was done by the Cerebral Palsy International Sports and Recreation Association (CP-ISRA). This remained the case in 2012.

== History ==
In 1983 CP-ISRA was responsible for the classification of competitors in Boccia. Their classification followed the system designed for field athletics events and originally used five cerebral palsy classes for competitors. Class 1 competitors could compete in co-ed team events which included three competitors from class 1 and class 2, with one required to be a class 1 competitor. They could also compete in the individual events. By the early 1990s, boccia classification had moved away from medical based system to a functional classification system. In 1992, the International Paralympic Committee formally took control of governance for many disability sports. Because of issues in objectively identifying functionality that plagued the post Barcelona Games, the IPC unveiled plans to develop a new classification system in 2003. This classification system went into effect in 2007, and defined ten different disability types that were eligible to participate on the Paralympic level. It required that classification be sport specific, and served two roles. The first was that it determined eligibility to participate in the sport and that it created specific groups of sportspeople who were eligible to participate and in which class. The IPC left it up to International Federations to develop their own classification systems within this framework, with the specification that their classification systems use an evidence based approach developed through research.

== Eligibility ==
As of 2012, people with physical disabilities are eligible to compete in this sport. The level of physical impairment must be significant, such as brain injury or total body impaired function (as in the case of cerebral palsy). In 1983, CP-ISRA set the eligibility rules for classification for this sport. They defined cerebral palsy as a non-progressive brain legion that results in impairment. People with cerebral palsy or non-progressive brain damage were eligible for classification by them. The organisation also dealt with classification for people with similar impairments. For their classification system, people with spina bifida were not eligible unless they had medical evidence of loco-motor dysfunction. People with cerebral palsy and epilepsy were eligible provided the condition did not interfere with their ability to compete. People who had strokes were eligible for classification following medical clearance. Competitors with multiple sclerosis, muscular dystrophy and arthrogryposis were not eligible for classification by CP-ISRA, but were eligible for classification by International Sports Organisation for the Disabled for the Games of Les Autres.

In 2004, players with disabilities other than cerebral palsy became eligible with the introduction of the BC4 class.

== Classes ==
There are four classes in Boccia. Athletes are grouped according to their impairment as follows:

- BC1. Athletes who have Cerebral Palsy. They either kick or throw the ball. They may request the use of an assistant, providing the assistant remains outside of the athlete's box.
- BC2. Athletes who have Cerebral Palsy but are able to better throw the ball than BC1 players. They are not allowed the use of an assistant.
- BC3. Athletes with a severe physical disability (Cerebral Palsy or other) that prevents them from throwing or kicking the ball three metres. They require assistive equipment such as a ramp. An assistant is also allowed within the athlete's box, however they are not allowed to observe gameplay.
- BC4. Athletes who have a significant physical disability (non Cerebral Palsy) that makes it difficult for them to throw the ball. No assistants or assistive devices may be used.

These classes have some parallels with the cerebral palsy sport classification system used by CP-ISRA for the CP1 and CP2 classes.

== Process ==
For a boccia athlete to compete at the Paralympic Games, international classification by an International Classification Panel is required. The International Classification Panel will allocate a class to the athlete and rule which (if any) assistive equipment the athlete may use. Their ruling overrides all prior classifications including those of a national basis. Athletes must be classified according to their disability and level of impairment. The classification process normally involves a physical assessment to authenticate the disability and evaluate the degree of limitation. The athlete will be observed in competition action. Results will place the athlete in one of the four classes (see Classes): this evaluation cannot be used for sports outside of Boccia. For Australian competitors in this sport, the sport and classification is managed by the Australian Paralympic Committee. There are three types of classification available for Australian competitors: Provisional, national and international. The first is for club level competitions, the second for state and national competitions, and the third for international competitions.

== At the Paralympic Games ==
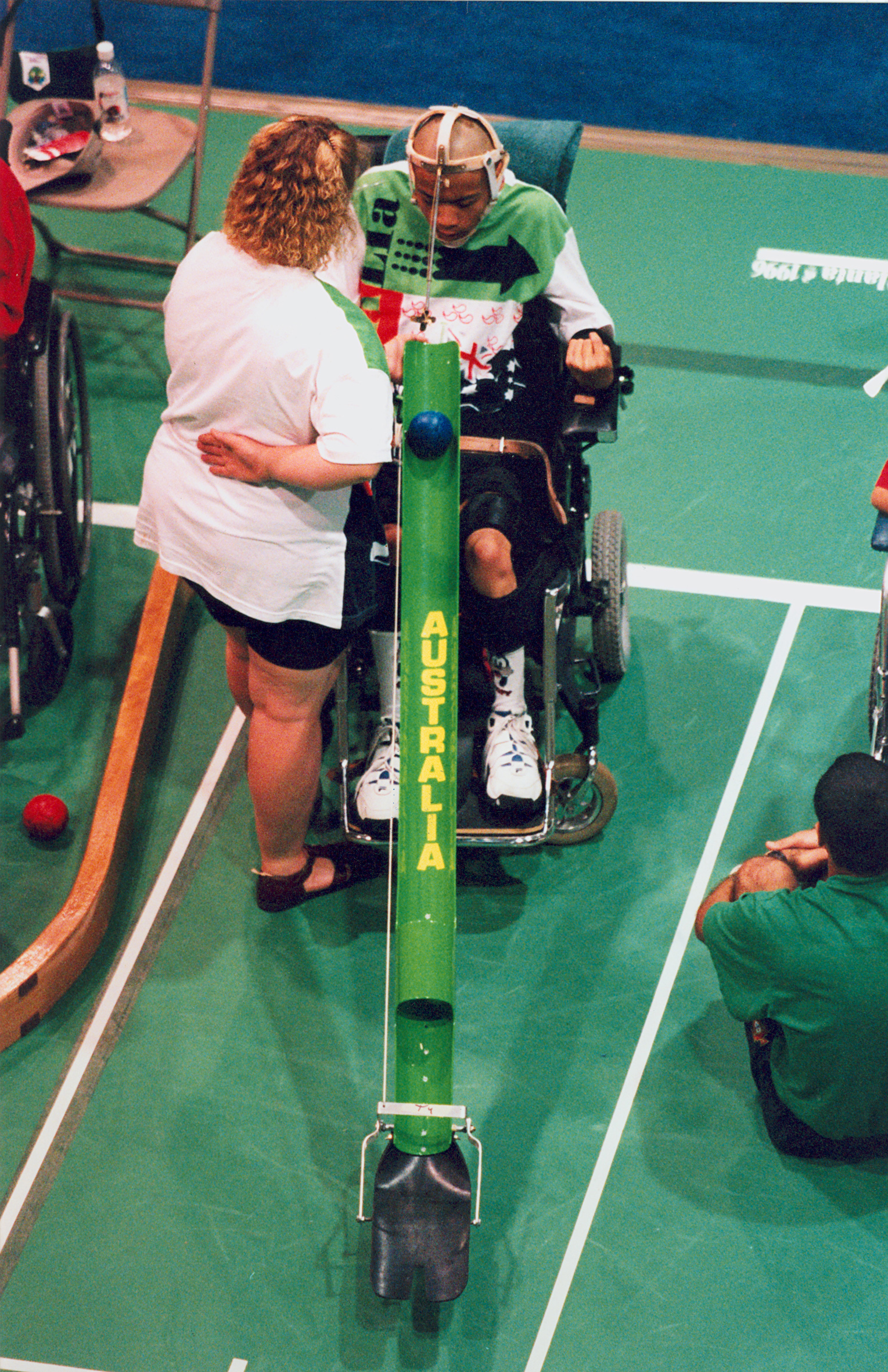
Boccia being played by Tu Huynh of Australia at the 1996 Summer Paralympics

At the 1992 Summer Paralympics, cerebral palsy disability types were eligible to participate, with classification being run through CP-ISRA, with classification based on disability type. At the 2000 Summer Paralympics, 7 assessments were conducted at the Games. This resulted in 0 class changes. 1 PNS protest was filed and the classification was upheld. Boccia competition at the London 2012 Summer Olympics will be held at ExCeL Exhibition Centre from 2 September to 8 September. Competition play is mixed: 104 men and women will compete for seven medal events. In each team event, one team of three athletes per country is allowed.

For the 2016 Summer Paralympics in Rio, the International Paralympic Committee had a zero classification at the Games policy. This policy was put into place in 2014, with the goal of avoiding last minute changes in classes that would negatively impact athlete training preparations. All competitors needed to be internationally classified with their classification status confirmed prior to the Games, with exceptions to this policy being dealt with on a case-by-case basis. In case there was a need for classification or reclassification at the Games despite best efforts otherwise, boccia classification was scheduled for September 8 at Carioca Arena 2. For sportspeople with physical or intellectual disabilities going through classification or reclassification in Rio, their in competition observation event is their first appearance in competition at the Games.

== Future ==
Going forward, disability sport's major classification body, the International Paralympic Committee, is working on improving classification to be more of an evidence-based system as opposed to a performance-based system so as not to punish elite athletes whose performance makes them appear in a higher class alongside competitors who train less.
