= William Braniff =

American government official

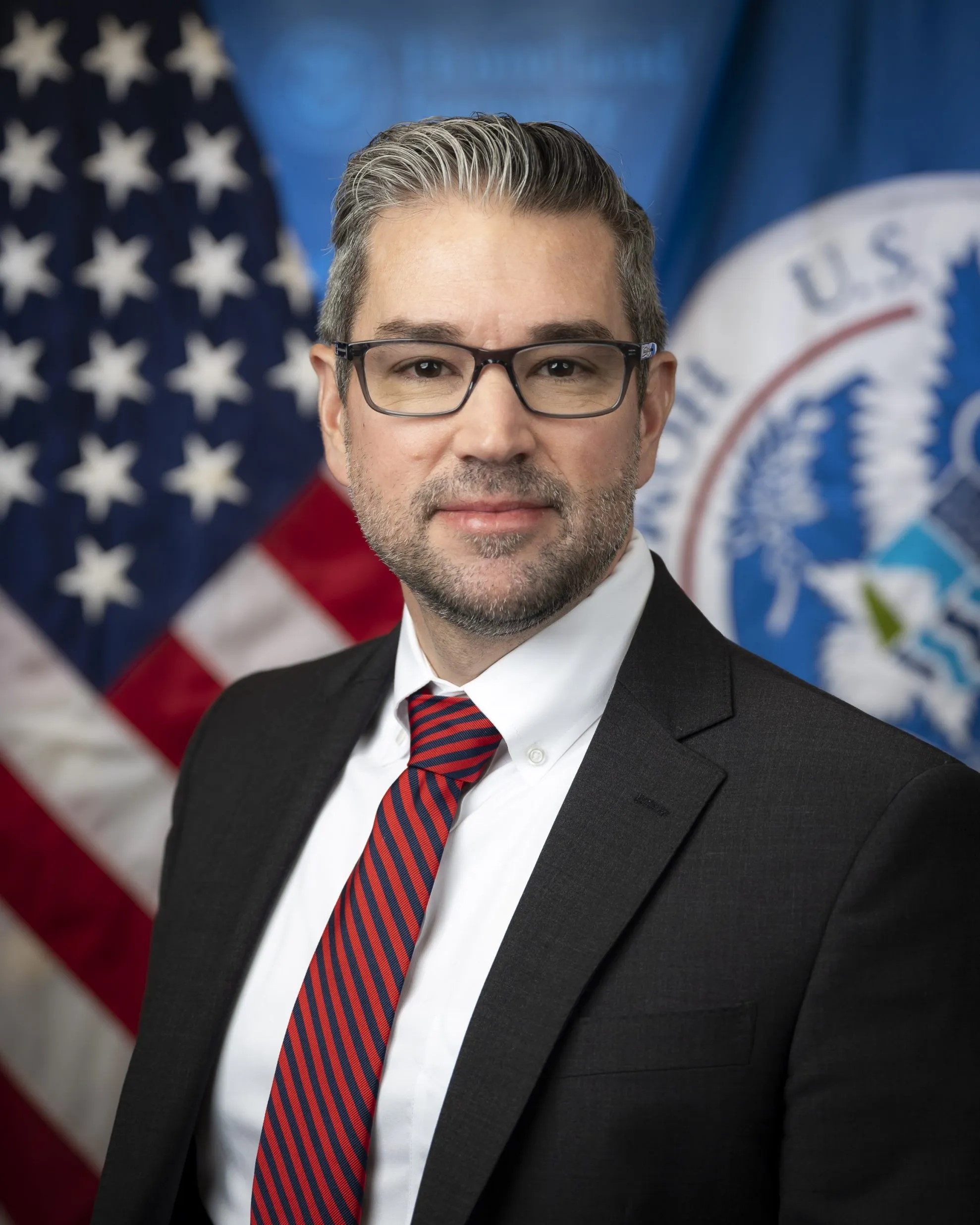
- Official portrait, 2024

Director of the United States Department of Homeland Security Center for Prevention Programs and Partnerships
- In office April 2023 – March 3, 2025
- President: Joe Biden; Donald Trump
- Preceded by: Jenny Presswalla (acting)
- Succeeded by: Thomas C. Fugate (acting)

Personal details
- Education: United States Military Academy (BS); Johns Hopkins University (MA)

Military service
- Branch/service: United States Army

William Braniff is an American counterterrorism scholar who served from 2023 to 2025 as director of the Center for Prevention Programs and Partnerships at the United States Department of Homeland Security. He resigned from that position in March 2025, in protest of drastic staffing cuts in the first months of the second presidency of Donald Trump. He is a graduate of the United States Military Academy and the School of Advanced International Studies at Johns Hopkins University.
