= CP2 (classification) =

Cerebral palsy sports classification

CP2 is a disability sport classification specific to cerebral palsy. In many sports, it is grouped inside other classifications to allow people with cerebral palsy to compete against people with other different disabilities but the same level of functionality. People in this class tend to use electric wheelchairs and are quadriplegic. CP2 competitors have better upper body control when compared to CP1.

Elite sports open to CP2 classified athletes include athletics, boccia, cycling, race running, slalom, swimming, lawn bowls and archery. In some of these sports, different classification systems or names for CP2 are used. When they go through classification, CP2 people need to use a wheelchair.

== Definition and participation ==
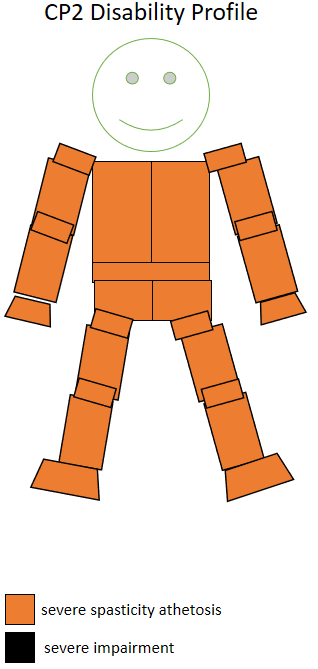
The spasticity athetosis level and location of a CP2 sportsperson.

Cerebral Palsy-International Sports and Recreation Association defined this class in January 2005 as, "Quadriplegic (Tetraplegic)-Severe to moderate involvement. Spasticity Grade 3+ to 3 with or without athetosis. Severe athetoid or tetraplegic with more function in less affected side. Poor functional strength in all extremities and trunk but able to propel a wheelchair. Lower Extremities-A demonstrable degree of function in one or both lower limbs allowing propulsion of the wheelchair automatically qualifies individual as a Class 2 lower. If the classification team determines that the upper limb function is more appropriate for a higher 23 class then the athlete does not qualify as Class 2. Class 2 athletes (upper or lower) can sometimes ambulate but never run functionally. Trunk Control-Static control is fair. Dynamic trunk control is poor as demonstrated by the obligatory use of upper extremities and/or head to assist in returning to the mid-line (upright position). Upper Extremities-Hand-Severe to moderate involvement. Spasticity Grade 3."

== Performance ==
People in this class tend to use electric wheelchairs. They may have controlled shakes and twitches. This bodily activity can spike their metabolic rate. They can operate a manual wheelchair but this is restricted because of motor control issues. Functional control issues effect all or most of their limbs. When participating in sport, CP2 competitors tend to have low energy expenditure.

While CP2, CP3 and CP6 have similar issues with Athetoid or Ataxic, CP6 competitors have "flight" while they are ambulant in that it is possible for both feet to not be touching the ground while walking. CP2 and CP3 are unable to do this. CP2 competitors have better upper body control when compared to CP1.

== Sports ==
=== Athletics ===
T52 function level.

In IPC sanctioned competitions, CP2 players are classified as T32/F32. Events that may be on the program for CP2 competitors include the club, discus throw, shot put and javelin. In track events, they have poor wheelchair control and may only be able to push their chair forwards using one arm. In field throwing events, CP2 competitors may have poor device release because of spasticity in their hands but still have good upper body rotation. Their throwing motion generally is not a typical one owing to the lack of motion control. In some cases, CP2 athletes be grouped in with F51, F52 or F53 classes.

Prior to a classification rule change made in 2009, CP2 Lower athletes often compete in T31 for track events. Historically, CP2 athletes were more active in track events. Changes in the classification during the 1980s and 1990s led to most track events for CP2 racers being dropped and replaced exclusively with field events. This has been criticized, because with the rise of commercialization of the Paralympic movement, there has been a reduction of classes in more popular sports for people with the most severe disabilities as these classes often have much higher support costs associated with them.

=== Boccia ===
Boccia made its debut on the Paralympic program at the 1984 Games. Boccia began to develop as an important sport for people in this class as track events began to disappear. The timing of this matched with a push by the CP-ISRA to promote the sport.

People with cerebral palsy are eligible to compete in boccia at the Paralympic Games. CP2 competitors compete in the BC1 or BC2 class in BisFed events. BC1 CP2 boccia players may push the ball with their feet instead of their arms or using a ramp like CP1 players in the same class. They are allowed to have assistants. BC2 classified players are not allowed to have assistants.

=== Cycling ===
CP1 to CP4 competitors may compete using tricycles in the T1 class. Tricycles are only eligible to compete in road events, not track ones. Tricycles are often required because their level of CP effects their balance and they are unable to use a standard bicycle. CP2 cyclists may also use a handcycle in the H1 class. All CP2 cyclists are required to wear a helmet, with a special color used to designate their class. Their helmet color is red.

=== Race running ===
CP2 race runners are classified as RR2. The classes events include the 100 meters, 200 meters and 400 meters. The running style of CP2 competitors differs a lot within the class. They may run using a standard form but with much shorter slides. They may also run with their legs butterflying. They generally do not require their arms be strapped to race runner. They will still have difficulty grasping the handles and steering. Compared to other CP race running classes, CP1 and CP2 have a low economy of movement.

=== Slalom ===
One of the available sports for CP2 competitors is slalom. Slalom involves an obstacle course for people using carts. CP2 competitors use self-propelled carts to navigate the course.

=== Swimming ===
S2 functionality.

CP2 sports people are eligible to compete in swimming at the Paralympic Games. CP2 tend to be classified as S2. CP2 swimmers tend to have a passive normalized drag in the range of 1.0 to 1.1. This puts them into the passive drag band of PDB4.

=== Other sports ===
People with cerebral palsy are eligible to compete at the elite level in a number of other sports including lawn bowls and archery.

== Classification process ==
The process for being classified is often sports specific. As a general rule, CP2 sportspeople need to attend classification in a wheelchair. Failure to do so could result in them being classified as an ambulatory CP class competitor such as CP5 or CP6, or a related sport specific class.

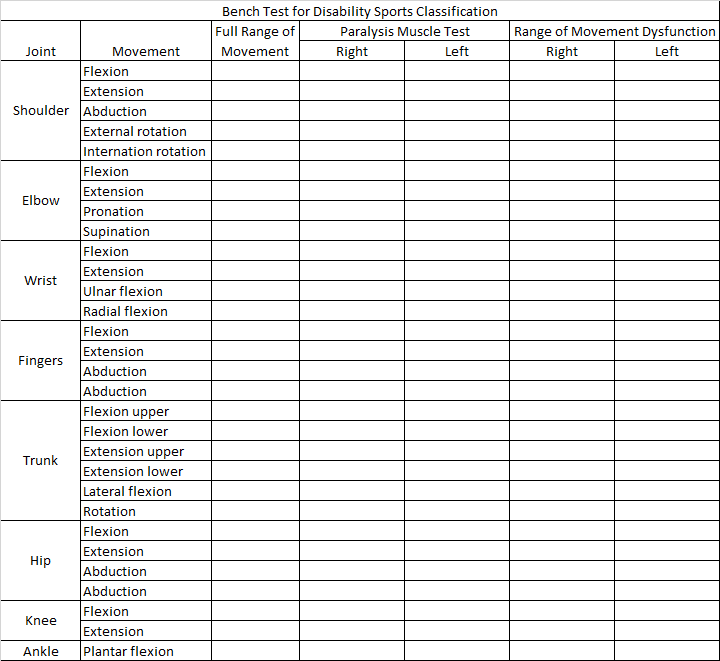
A standard bench press form used to for functional classification for wheelchair sportspeople.

One of the standard means of assessing functional classification is the bench test, which is used in swimming, lawn bowls and wheelchair fencing. Using the Adapted Research Council (MRC) measurements, muscle strength is tested using the bench press for a variety of disabilities a muscle being assessed on a scale of 1 to 5 for people with cerebral palsy and other issues with muscle spasticity. A 1 is for no functional movement of the muscle or where there is no motor coordination. A 2 is for normal muscle movement range not exceeding 25% or where the movement can only take place with great difficult and, even then, very slowly. A 3 is where normal muscle movement range does not exceed 50%. A 4 is when normal muscle movement range does not exceed 75% and or there is slight in-coordination of muscle movement. A 5 is for normal muscle movement.

Swimming classification for CP2 swimmers generally has three components. The first is a bench press. The second is water test. The third is in competition observation. As part of the water test, swimmers are often required to demonstrate their swimming technique for all four strokes. They usually swim a distance of 25 meters for each stroke. They are also generally required to demonstrate how they enter the water and how they turn in the pool.
