= Center for Prevention Programs and Partnerships =

Internal research program of the United States Department of Homeland Security

U.S. Department of Homeland Security Center for Prevention Programs and Partnerships
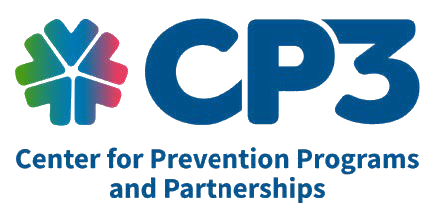

Agency overview
- Formed: 2021; 5 years ago
- Preceding agency: Office of Targeted Violence and Terrorism Prevention
- Jurisdiction: Federal government of the United States
- Headquarters: Washington, D.C., U.S.
- Parent department: United States Department of Homeland Security
- Parent divisions: DHS Office of Strategy, Policy, and Plans; Office of Counterterrorism, Threat Prevention, and Law Enforcement
- Website: www.dhs.gov/CP3

The Center for Prevention Programs and Partnerships (CP3) is a division of the United States Department of Homeland Security (DHS). Established in 2021 to replace the Office of Targeted Violence and Terrorism Prevention (TVTP), CP3 is charged with coordinating with federal, state, and local government agencies, non-profit organizations, and other stakeholders to fund, research, and otherwise facilitate the prevention of terrorism, including administering DHS's TVTP Grant Program.

CP3 saw its staff reduced by approximately three-quarters during the early months of the second presidency of Donald Trump; director William Braniff resigned in protest of the cuts.

In June 2025, ProPublica reported that 22 year old Thomas Fugate had been appointed to lead CP3. However, a DHS official disputed this, claiming that Fugate was given 'additional level responsibilities'. DHS later stated that Fugate was a 'low level staffer'.

== Organization and governance ==
=== List of directors ===
- John Picarelli, 2021–2022 (Note: Picarelli previously served, from 2020, as the director of CP3's predecessor, the DHS Office of Targeted Violence and Terrorism Prevention.)
- Jenny Presswalla (acting Director), 2022–2023
- William Braniff, 2023–2025
