= LTA-PD =

Paralympic rowing classification

LTA-PD is an adaptive rowing classification for people with physical disabilities that was developed in March 2011. It includes people with spinal cord injuries generally at around the S1 level. It also includes people with cerebral palsy. People in this class have issues with their legs, arms and trunk.

== Definition ==
Rowing Australia defines this classification as "It includes athletes with a physical disability[.] .... Athletes with a physical disability that typically compete as LTA-PD include: Amputees, or Neurological Impairment equivalent to incomplete lesion at S1, or Classification by the international sports federation for rowers with cerebral palsy (CPISRA) as eligible to be in Class 8"

== Disability groups ==
=== Cerebral palsy ===
People competing in this class with cerebral palsy include people classified CP8.

==== CP8 ====
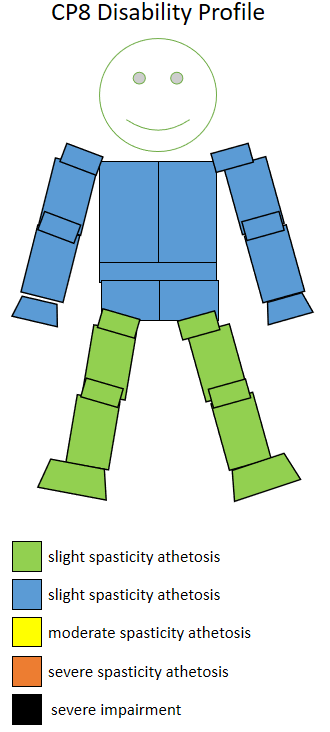
The spasticity athetosis level and location of a CP8 sportsperson.

CP8 classified competitors are the group who are least physically affected by their cerebral palsy. CP8 class sports people tend to participate in football, cycling, swimming and athletics.

Cerebral Palsy-International Sports and Recreation Association defined this class in January 2005 as, "Minimal involvement 27 This class is for the minimally affected diplegic Spasticity Grade 1; hemiplegic Spasticity Grade 1: monoplegic; minimal athetoid/ataxic athlete. According to point 1.2 the athlete must have an obvious impairment of function evident during classification. This athlete may appear to have near normal function when running but the athlete must demonstrate a limitation in function to classifiers based on evidence of spasticity (increased tone), ataxic, athetoid or dystonic movements while performing on the field of play or in training."

=== Spinal cord injuries ===
People with spinal cord injuries compete in this class, including F7 sportspeople.

==== F7 ====
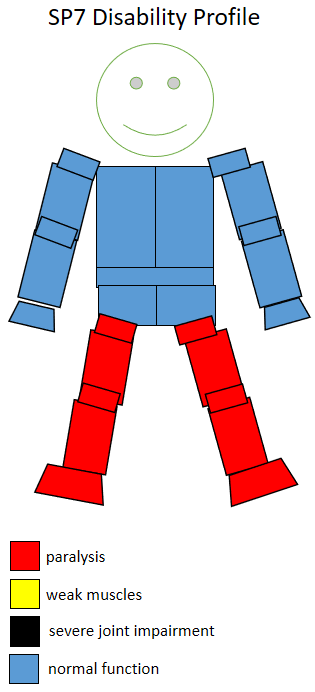
Functional profile of a wheelchair sportsperson in the F7 class.

F7 is wheelchair sport classification, that corresponds to the neurological level S1- S2. The location of lesions on different vertebrae tend to be associated with disability levels and functionality issues. S1 is associated with ankle plantar flexors. People with a lesion at S1 have their hamstring and peroneal muscles effected. Functionally, they can bend their knees and lift their feet. They can walk on their own, though they may require ankle braces or orthopedic shoes. They can generally change in any physical activity. People with lesions at the L4 to S2 who are complete paraplegics may have motor function issues in their gluts and hamstrings. Their quadriceps are likely to be unaffected. They may be absent sensation below the knees and in the groin area.

One of the sports available to people in this class is adaptive rowing. In this sport, people with incomplete spinal cord injury at S1 compete in LTA. They have use of their legs, arms and trunk.

== Events ==
Rowers in this classification compete in single and sculls for club, state, and national competitions. In international competitions, they compete in mixed cox fours sculls, with a maximum of two visually impaired rowers in the boat.

== History ==
The classifications were developed and current as of March 2011. For the 2016 Summer Paralympics in Rio, the International Paralympic Committee had a zero classification at the Games policy. This policy was put into place in 2014, with the goal of avoiding last minute changes in classes that would negatively impact athlete training preparations. All competitors needed to be internationally classified with their classification status confirmed prior to the Games, with exceptions to this policy being dealt with on a case-by-case basis.

== Becoming classified ==
Classification is handled by FISA – International Rowing Federation. Australians seeking classification through Rowing Australia need to provide several documents to a classifier at the time of application, including a doctor's statement that documents their impairment, when it was acquired and if the doctor expects changes in the level of disability in terms of increases or decreases in the severity of the disability.
