= Pareši =

- Village
- Пареши
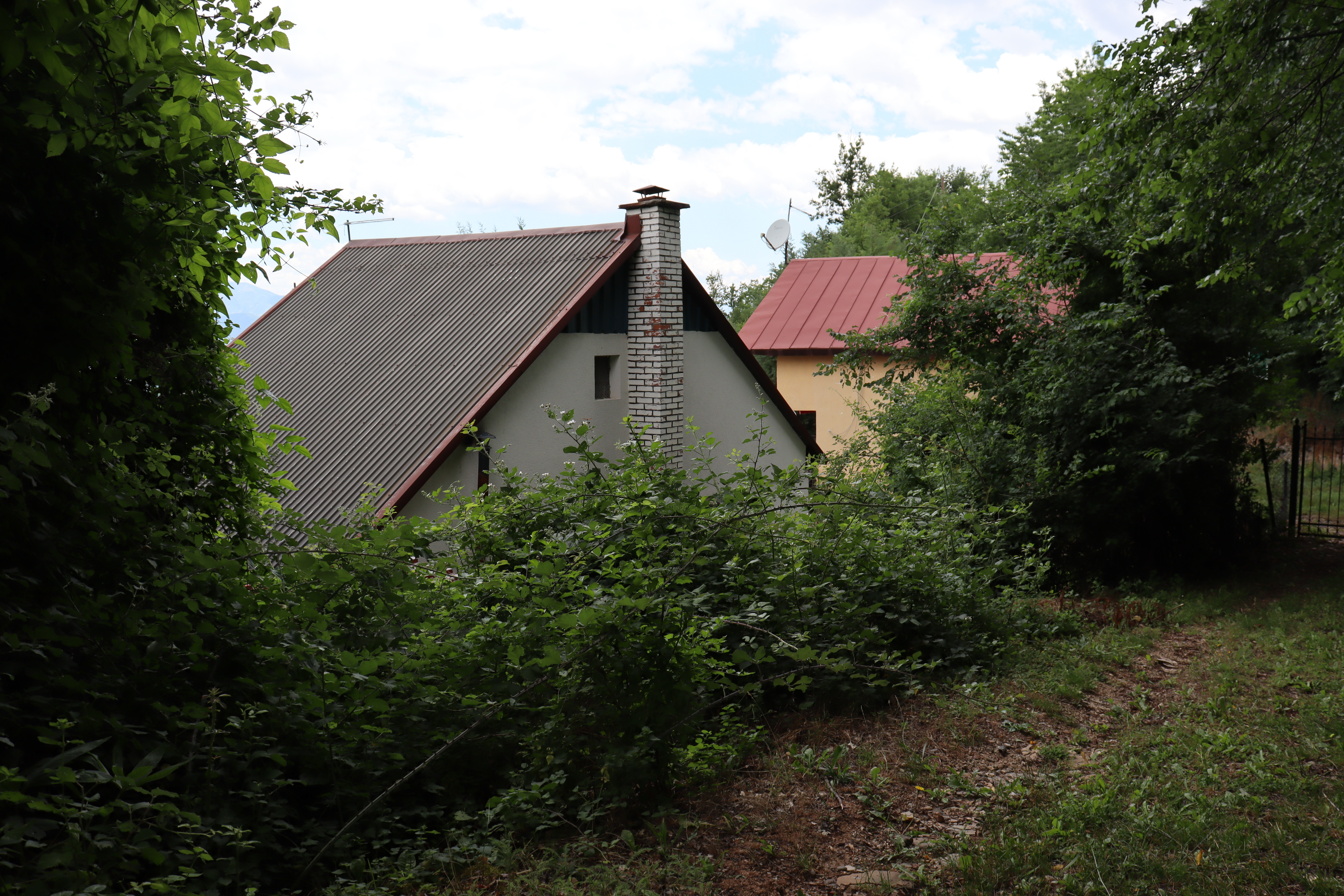
- Houses in the village

- Location within North Macedonia
- Coordinates: 41°29′44″N 20°33′42″E
- Country: North Macedonia
- Region: Southwestern
- Municipality: Centar Župa

Population (2002)
  - Total: 0
- Time zone: UTC+1 (CET)
  - Summer (DST): UTC+2 (CEST)
- Car plates: DB

Pareši (Macedonian: Пареши) is a village in the municipality of Centar Župa, North Macedonia.

== Name ==
The name of the village is derived from a personal name Pare, from Pampar, with the suffix eš(i) and the toponym is probably Albanian.

== Demographics ==
Pareši (Paris) is recorded in the Ottoman defter of 1467 as a village in the vilayet of Upper Dibra, part of the timar of Jusuf. The settlement was recorded as abandoned.

The village when inhabited in past times had an Orthodox Macedonian speaking population.

According to the 2002 census, the village had a total of 0 inhabitants.
