= Triparesis =

Weakening of three limbs

Triparesis is a medical condition, similar to triplegia, but the major difference between the two is primarily that triplegia is total loss of function in three limbs, and triparesis denotes weakening of three limbs.
