= CP3 (classification) =

Cerebral palsy sports classification

CP3 is a disability sport classification specific to cerebral palsy. In many sports, it is grouped inside other classifications to allow people with cerebral palsy to compete against people with other different disabilities but the same level of functionality. Compared higher number CP classes, they have increased issues with head movement and trunk function. They tend to use wheelchairs on a daily basis though they may be ambulant with the use of assistive devices.

Sportspeople in this class are eligible to participate in a number of sports on the elite level. They include athletics, cycling, skiing, swimming, wheelchair tennis, archery, wheelchair fencing, wheelchair curling, table tennis, shooting, sailing, powerlifting, para-equestrian, rowing and archery. In some of these sports, different classification systems or names for CP3 are used. Because CP3 sportspeople use wheelchairs in most of the classes they compete in, they need to attend classification events while in their wheelchair to insure they do not get classed in an ambulatory class.

== Definition and participation ==
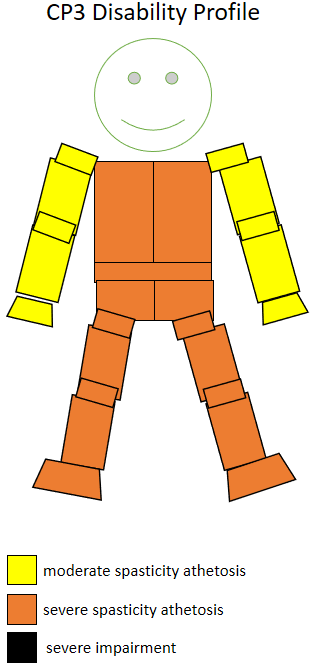
The spasticity athetosis level and location of a CP3 sportsperson.

Cerebral Palsy-International Sports and Recreation Association (CP-ISRA) defined this class in January 2005 as, "Quadriplegic (Tetraplegic), Severe Hemiplegic - Moderate (asymmetric or symmetric) quadriplegic or severe hemiplegic in a wheelchair with almost full functional strength in dominant upper extremity. It is rare for an athlete with athetosis to be included within this class unless he/she presents with a predominantly hemiplegic or triplegic profile with almost full function in the dominant upper limb. Can propel a wheelchair independently."

== Performance ==
On a daily basis, CP3 sportspeople are likely to use a wheelchair. Some may be ambulant with the use of assistive devices. While they may have good trunk control, they may have some issues with strong forward movements of their torso. While CP2, CP3 and CP6 have similar issues with Athetoid or Ataxic, CP6 competitors have "flight" while they are ambulant in that it is possible for both feet to not be touching the ground while walking. CP2 and CP3 are unable to do this. Head movement and trunk function differentiate this class from CP4. Lack of symmetry in arm movement are another major difference between the two classes, with CP3 competitors having less symmetry.

== Sports ==
=== Athletics ===
CP3 competitors compete in athletic events in the T33/F33 classes. In some cases, CP3 athletes may be classified as F53, F54, or F55. Events that may be on the program for CP3 competitors include the club, discus throw, shot put and javelin. While F33/F53/F54/F55 throwers may be able to walk with assistance, competitors throw from a fixed seated position.

Historically, CP3 athletes were more active in track events. Changes in the classification during the 1980s and 1990s led to most track events for CP3 racers being dropped and replaced exclusively with field events. This has been criticized, because with the rise of commercialization of the Paralympic movement, there has been a reduction of classes in more popular sports for people with the most severe disabilities as these classes often have much higher support costs associated with them.

=== Cycling ===
People with cerebral palsy are eligible to compete in cycling at the elite level and at the Paralympic Games. CP1 to CP4 competitors may compete using tricycles in the T1 class. Tricycles are only eligible to compete in road events, not track ones. Tricycles are required because their level of CP effects their balance and they are unable to use a standard bicycle. CP3 cyclists may also use a handcycle in the H1 class.

Cyclists in this class are required to wear a helmet, with a special color used to designate them as CP3 cyclists during a race. CP3 class competitors wear a blue helmet.

=== Skiing ===
CP3 athletes are eligible to compete in skiing competitions at the elite level and the Paralympic Games. CP3 Nordic skiers compete in LW10 and LW11. CP3 alpine skiers compete in LW10 or LW11.

=== Swimming ===
CP3 sportspeople with cerebral palsy are eligible to compete in swimming at the Paralympic Games. CP3 swimmers may be found in several classes. These include S3, and S4.

CP3 swimmers tend to have a passive normalized drag in the range of 0.9 to 1.1. This puts them into the passive drag band of PDB3, and PDB5. Because the disability of swimmers in this class involves in a loss of function in specific parts of their body, they are more prone to injury than their able-bodied counterparts as a result of overcompensation in other parts of their body. When fatigued, asymmetry in their stroke becomes a problem for swimmers in this class.

=== Other sports ===
People with cerebral palsy are eligible to compete at the elite level in a number of other sports including wheelchair tennis, archery, wheelchair fencing, wheelchair curling, table tennis, shooting, sailing, powerlifting, para-equestrian, rowing and archery. Race running is another sport open to this class. CP3 race runners may be classified as RR2 or RR3. One of the available sports for CP3 competitors is slalom. Slalom involves an obstacle course for people using carts. CP3 competitors use self-propelled carts to navigate the course.

== Classification process ==
While some CP3 people may be ambulatory, they generally go through the classification process while using a wheelchair. This is because they often compete from a seated position. Failure to do so could result in them being classified as an ambulatory CP class competitor such as CP5 or CP6, or a related sport specific class.

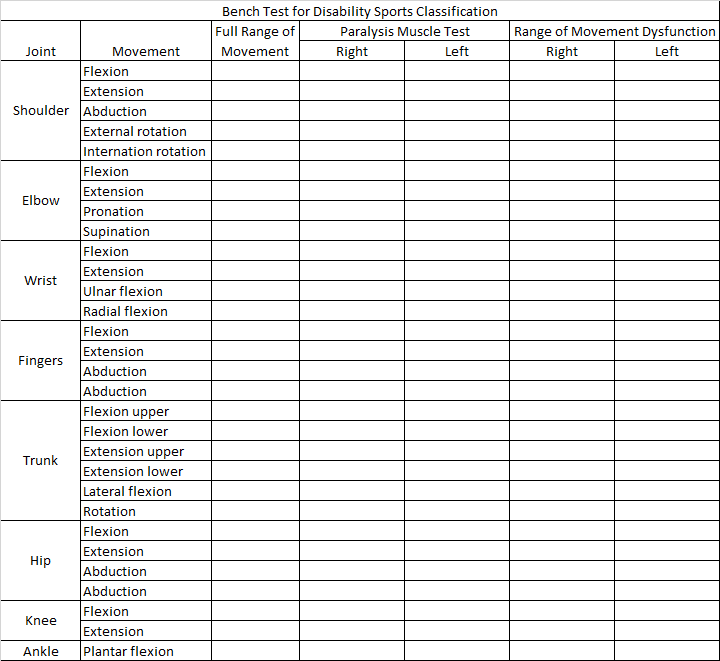
A standard bench press form used to for functional classification for wheelchair sportspeople.

One of the standard means of assessing functional classification is the bench test, which is used in swimming, lawn bowls and wheelchair fencing. Using the Adapted Research Council (MRC) measurements, muscle strength is tested using the bench press for a variety of disabilities a muscle being assessed on a scale of 1 to 5 for people with cerebral palsy and other issues with muscle spasticity. A 1 is for no functional movement of the muscle or where there is no motor coordination. A 2 is for normal muscle movement range not exceeding 25% or where the movement can only take place with great difficult and, even then, very slowly. A 3 is where normal muscle movement range does not exceed 50%. A 4 is when normal muscle movement range does not exceed 75% and or there is slight in-coordination of muscle movement. A 5 is for normal muscle movement.

Swimming classification generally has three components that CP3 sportspeople must go through. The first is a bench press. The second is water test. The third is in competition observation. As part of the water test, swimmers are often required to demonstrate their swimming technique for all four strokes. They usually swim a distance of 25 meters for each stroke. They are also generally required to demonstrate how they enter the water and how they turn in the pool.
