= Diplegia =

Paralysis in symmetrical parts of the body

Diplegia, when used singularly, refers to paralysis affecting symmetrical parts of the body. It can involve any body area, such as both sides of the face, both arms, or both legs. It is different from hemiplegia which refers to spasticity restricted to one side of the body, paraplegia which refers to paralysis restricted to the legs and hip, and quadriplegia which requires the involvement of all four limbs but not necessarily symmetrical.

Diplegia may be caused by cerebral palsy or by injury of the spinal cord, as well as by some rarer causes. There is no set course of progression for people with diplegia. Symptoms may get worse, but the neurological part does not change. The primary parts of the brain that are affected by diplegia are the ventricles, fluid-filled compartments in the brain, and the wiring from the center of the brain to the cerebral cortex. There is also usually some degeneration of the cerebral neurons, as well as problems in the upper motor neuron system.

== Facial diplegia ==
Facial diplegia refers to people with paralysis of both sides of their face. Bilateral occurs when the onset of the second side occurs within one month of the onset of the first side. Facial diplegia occurs in 50% of patients with Guillain–Barré syndrome. Facioscapulohumeral muscular dystrophy (FSHD) is the second most common adult-onset muscular dystrophy with facial weakness being a distinct feature of FSHD in over 90% of cases.

=== Causes ===
Facial paralysis is usually caused by traumatic, infectious, neurological, metabolic, toxic, vascular, and idiopathic conditions. While over 50% of the cases of unilateral facial paralysis are caused by idiopathic conditions, less than 20% of bilateral cases are idiopathic. The most common infectious cause of facial diplegia is Lyme disease.

=== Treatment ===
The treatment for facial diplegia depends on the underlying cause. Some causes are usually treatable such as infectious, toxic, and vascular by treating the main problem first. After the underlying problem is cured, the facial paralysis usually will go away.

== Diplegia of the arms ==
People with diplegia in their arms experience difficulties in reaching, pointing, grasping, releasing, manipulating objects and many other motor functions performed by the hands and arms.

=== Causes ===
There are several ways of getting diplegia in the arms. It is common for people with cerebral palsy to have diplegia of the arms. Although most people with cerebral palsy have diplegia in their legs, some people have diplegia in their arms. Other ways of getting paralysis of both arms is through a traumatic event or injury. Brachial amyotrophic diplegia, a regional variant of ALS, is a rare motor neuron disease characterized by diplegia in the arms.

=== Treatment ===
There are several different modes of treatment for people with paralysis in their upper limbs. For example, behavioral and environmental treatments may include physiotherapy, occupational therapy, motor learning, strength training, and neurodevelopment treatment. Another treatment may be through the use of splints and casts. Electrophysical agents may be used such as neuromuscular electrical stimulation (NMES). Sometimes pharmacological treatments are necessary such as Botulinum toxin type A. On more severe cases surgery of the upper limbs may be required.

== Diplegia in the legs ==
Diplegia of the legs consists of paralysis of both legs. There are 3 levels of severity. Mild diplegia means the person can usually walk but might walk a little differently, can usually play and run to a limited extent. Moderate diplegia means the person can usually walk but with a slight bend in the knees. They usually cannot run and have to use the handrails to go up and down steps. People with severe diplegia usually need crutches, a walker, or a wheelchair to be able to get around.

Children with diplegia in the legs have a delayed growth in their leg muscles which causes the muscles to be short. This then causes the joints to become stiff and the range of motion to decrease as the child grows. “For the majority of children with diplegia, growth and development are not a problem. Children with diplegia are eventually able to walk, just normally later; they generally attend regular schools and become independently functioning adults.”

=== Causes ===
The most common cause of diplegia in the legs is cerebral palsy. Paralysis of the legs may also be caused by trauma, injury, or genetics, but this is very rare.

=== Age of onset ===
Usually occurs within 2 periods:

1. With premature babies
2. full diagnosis usually between ages 2–5 years

Diplegia is usually not diagnosed before the age of 2 years yet the symptoms and signs of the earlier stages are typical and should enable the diagnosis to be made before the contractures have occurred. Parents suspecting diplegia should take their child to the doctor to potentially get an earlier diagnosis.

=== Treatment and care ===
This is broken up by age categories. Different ages require different forms of treatment which may include: therapy, bracing, walkers, wheelchairs, and surgery. Currently the treatments for children are concentrated primarily on independent walking but instead a more independence-oriented therapeutic approach would be more beneficial. This way the child can still focus on walking but at the same time be taught to do things for themselves while using the best method of walking for them. This could include using a walker or wheelchair to get around and do things easier than focusing all the attention on walking so early. For people requiring surgery, distal hamstring lengthening is the most common operation performed because it reduces knee flexion and improves knee motion.

==== Birth to 1 year ====
“This first year sees the development of many milestones, such as head control, reaching out for a toy, sitting, starting to vocalize sounds, and finger feeding.” Most parents want their children to excel very fast, but there is a wide upper and lower range of development time for premature babies so it's very hard to diagnose cerebral palsy or diplegia this early. The most common symptom of a child with diplegia is stiff lower extremities. This should become apparent by the six month mark which means he or she does not have severe diplegia. During this age if a child is not moving his legs on his own then it is recommended to do some exercise, especially gentle stretching with the child.

==== 1 to 3 years ====
“This is the age at which the characteristics of diplegia become more noticeable, mainly because, unlike other children at this age, the child with diplegia is not walking.” By the age of three, it is important for the child to be in a specialized school environment so the child can participate in physical therapy and learn social skills. Parents should not force the child to sit, crawl, or walk a certain way during this age period. Let the child do what's comfortable for them and allow the therapist to correct this problem. If you want to help your child walk more, then push toys are recommended for walking aids. Regular exams should be done to make sure the child's legs are growing normally and he or she is not having any problems with the hip.

==== 4 to 6 years ====
“This is the age range at which the child with diplegia makes the most significant physical improvement in motor function.” During this time period the child makes major improvements in motor function. He or she should be in a regular school and focus on cognitive issues not therapy. A child using a walking aid for mobility to move around with the other children is not a bad thing. If a child is not walking yet, then this is usually caused by a problem in balance, muscle coordination, spasticity, or leg alignment. Each of these reasons should be looked into closely so the problem can be addressed and fixed.

==== 7 to 12 years ====
“By the time a child reaches this age the rate of physical improvement has leveled off in areas such as balance and coordination, and it's a good idea to refocus the child’s attention away from additional physical improvement and toward intellectual learning.” During this time period a child should lean away from physical therapy and do more outdoor or social exercises such as sports and adaptive P.E. Usually by age 8-10 a child has reached maximum walking ability. This will usually decrease a little when a child hits puberty and gains height and weight because walking becomes harder during this changing period. Any significant problems in walking should be addressed with surgery at this stage.

==== 13 to 18 years ====
“During this time period of a child’s development, a major issue is separating from the family.” Parents should learn how to cope with their child growing up and give them more freedom and independence. Teenagers need to make their own decisions and learn from them. One way to do this is for parents to compromise and let the child make smaller decisions so they feel important. Parents should also understand that their child may regress in walking some from increase in height and weight. Going back to therapy during puberty is recommended so the teenager can adjust to the increase in height and weight and not regress as much.

== History of the term diplegia ==
In 1890 Sachs and Peterson first referenced to the term diplegia, along with the word paraplegia, for their cerebral palsy classification. In 1955 the word diplegia was used in the clinical field to describe a patient whose limbs were affected in a symmetrical way. This included limbs on the same side of the body thus including hemiplegia. Later in 1956 diplegia was presented as a form of bilateral cerebral palsy affecting like parts on either side of the body. In 1965 Milani Comparetti distinguished diplegia from tetraplegia by considering the patient's upper limb's ability to express a sufficient support reaction. Thus diplegia usually refers to just symmetry of one body part or limb, as the legs, or arms. While tetraplegia or quadriplegia refers to paralysis of all 4, both arms and legs.
