= BC1 =

Boccia classification

BC1 is a boccia classification. The class is open to people with several different types of disabilities, including cerebral palsy. BC1 players have events open to them in boccia on the Paralympic Games program.

== Definition ==
In 2000, BBC Sport defined this classification as "in class 1 those athletes who are dependent on an electric wheelchair or assistance for mobility," In 2008, BBC Sport defined this classification was "BC1: Athletes may compete with the help of an assistant, who must remain outside the athlete's playing box. The assistant can only stabilize or adjust the playing chair and give a ball to the player on his request" In 2008, the Australian Broadcasting Corporation defined this classification was "BC1: This category is for both throwers and foot players (those who kick the balls to the jack). Athletes can have help from an assistant, who can hold the player's wheelchair steady or adjust it, and can give the ball to the player for the next attempt, if the player asks for it." In 2012, the Cerebral Palsy International Sports and Recreation Association defined this classification as: "BC 1 – These athletes have restricted trunk movement and poor sitting balance but is able to throw the ball, usually overhand. If needed, this athlete may have an assistant hand them the ball." In 2012, the Great Britain Boccia Federation defined this classification as: "Players with Cerebral Palsy who are able to use their hands or feet to consistently propel a ball into play. BC1 athletes may have an aide on court to pass them their ball before each shot"

== Disability groups ==
One of the disability groups in this classification is boccia with cerebral palsy, including CP-ISRA CP1 and CP2 classified players.

CP1 competitors are classified as either BC1 or BC3. In BC1, they can generally throw the ball past the V Line. They are allowed to have assistants. CP1 sportspeople tend to use electric wheelchairs. They may have controlled shakes and twitches. They have severely limited of their trunk and limbs. When participating in sport, CP1 competitors tend to have low energy expenditure. This bodily activity can spike their metabolic rate. CP1 competitors have worse upper body control when compared to CP2.

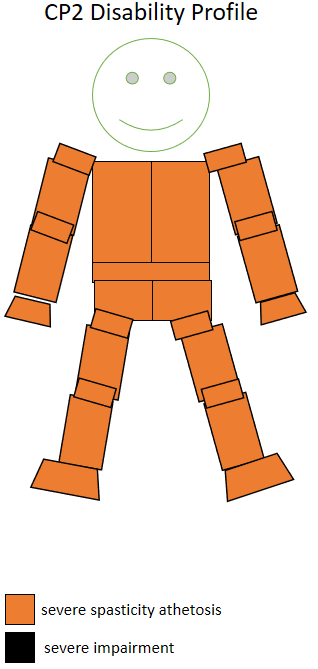
The spasticity athetosis level and location of a CP2 sportsperson.

CP2 competitors compete in the BC1 or BC2 class in BisFed events. BC1 CP2 boccia players may push the ball with their feet instead of their arms or using a ramp like CP1 players in the same class. They are allowed to have assistants. BC2 classified players are not allowed to have assistants.

CP2 boccia tend to use electric wheelchairs in everyday life. They may have controlled shakes and twitches. This bodily activity can spike their metabolic rate. They can operate a manual wheelchair but this is restricted because of motor control issues. Functional control issues effect all or most of their limbs. When participating in sport, CP2 competitors tend to have low energy expenditure.

== Events ==
Events this classification competes in are mixed gendered competitions for either single players or a pair of players. At the 2012 Summer Paralympics, this classification will compete in a six end individual event, and a team event featuring BC1 and BC2 competing against each other, with three players per team, one of whom must be BC1. The match will be six ends long, with each player having three balls per end. In team play, a team is allowed to have one substitute per classification. Players in this classification have five minutes to play an end.

== Classification and sport history ==
Boccia made its debut on the Paralympic program at the 1984 Games. Boccia began to develop as an important sport for people in this class as track events began to disappear. The timing of this matched with a push by the CP-ISRA to promote the sport.

== Competitions information and results ==
At the 2012 Australian national championships held at the Sydney Sport & Recreation from 30 April to 3 May, the BC1 individual event was won by Tyler Ellis from the Australian Capital Territory, second was won by William Marshall of Queensland and third place was won by John Richardson of Victoria.

=== Paralympic Games ===
At the 2012 Summer Paralympics, this classification competed in a six end individual event, and a team event featuring BC1 and BC2 competing against each other, with three players per team, one of whom must be BC1. The match will be six ends long, with each player having three balls per end.

For the 2016 Summer Paralympics in Rio, the International Paralympic Committee had a zero classification at the Games policy. This policy was put into place in 2014, with the goal of avoiding last minute changes in classes that would negatively impact athlete training preparations. All competitors needed to be internationally classified with their classification status confirmed prior to the Games, with exceptions to this policy being dealt with on a case-by-case basis. In case there was a need for classification or reclassification at the Games despite best efforts otherwise, boccia classification was scheduled for September 8 at Carioca Arena 2.

== Becoming classified ==
Classification is handled by Cerebral Palsy International Sports and Recreation Association. The classification officer for the Cerebral Palsy International Sports and Recreation Association is Joan Steele-Mills.

To be eligible for classification, a boccia competitor "must have a diagnosis of cerebral palsy, stroke, head injury or other nonprogressive brain damage with locomotor dysfunction, either congenital or acquired (exception: Boccia “BC 4” players)."

== Protesting classification ==
Competitors are allowed to protest their classification if they disagree with it. There is a formal process in place to allow this. On the international level, there are two types of protests: "new" protests for competitors who have not been previously classified and "review" protests for competitors who seek review before a major international competition. The protest on the international level must be made by the competitor's representative national Paralympic Committee or by the competitor's representative national sport federation. When a boccia competitor has been classified in the lead up to a major international championship, the relevant sporting bodies have 60 minutes from the end of the classification to protest it. Otherwise, if a competitor is classified outside of an event period, the relevant sporting organisations have thirty days after the last competition in which to file a protest. The relevant sporting body may also file a protest in a period of more than sixty days before the competitor is supposed to participate in an international event.
