= T1 (classification) =

Para-cycling classification

T1 is a para-cycling classification. It is for athletes with severe locomotive dysfunctions, and insufficient balance to use a regular bicycle. The class includes a number of different disability types including cerebral palsy. The class only competes in road events and uses tricycles (hence the "T" in T1).

== Definition ==
PBS defined this classification as "Tricycle 1 (T1) is for athletes with severe locomotor dysfunction and insufficient balance for cycling." In 1997, this classification was defined by Alison Gray in Against the odds : New Zealand Paralympians as: tetraplegic - almost no use of trunk, arms and hands". Gray noted this classification was for wheelchair athletes. The Telegraph defined this classification in 2011 as "T 1-2: Athletes on tricycles, who have severe locomotive dysfunctions and limited ability to pedal"

== Disability groups ==
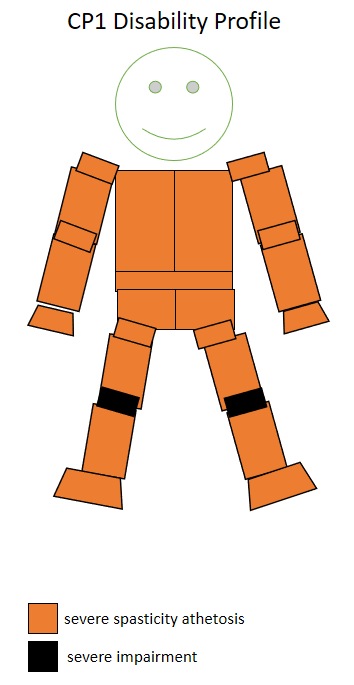
Disability type for CP1 classified sportspeople

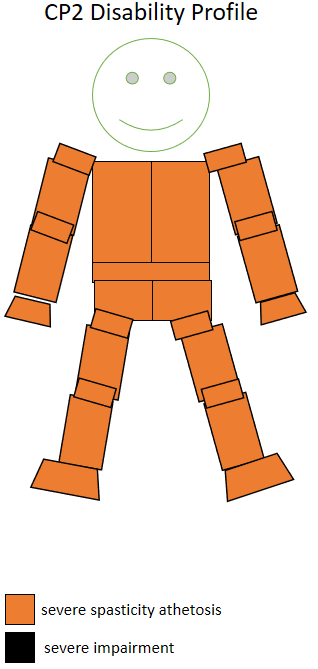
Disability type for CP2 classified sportspeople

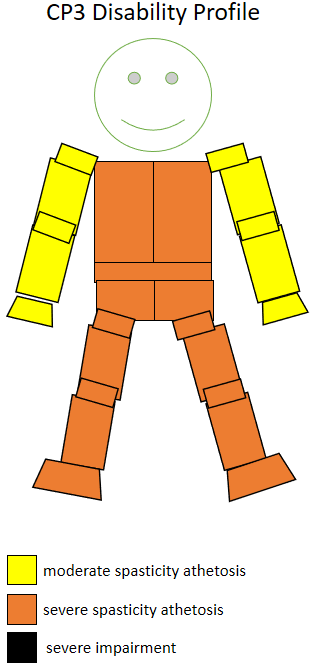
Disability type for CP3 classified sportspeople

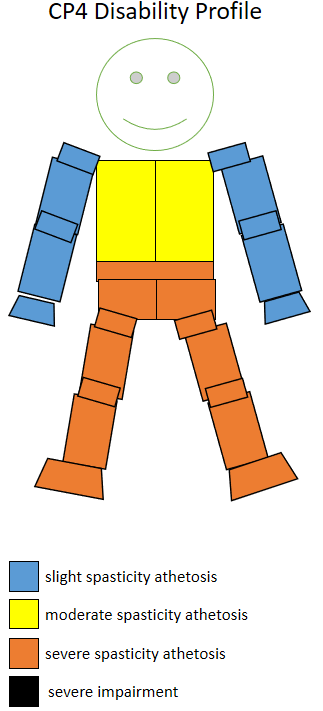
Disability type for CP4 classified sportspeople

The class includes people with cerebral palsy. CP1 to CP4 competitors may compete in the T1 class. Tricycles are only eligible to compete in road events, not track ones.

Cyclists within this class are required to wear a helmet, with a special color used to designate their class. Male T1 competitors wear black helmets; T1 women wear blue helmets.

== Classification history ==
Cycling first became a Paralympic sport at the 1988 Summer Paralympics. In September 2006, governance for para-cycling, including the responsibility for classification, passed from the International Paralympic Committee's International Cycling Committee to UCI.

== Becoming classified ==
Classification is handled by Union Cycliste Internationale. Classification for the UCI Para-Cycling World Championships is completed by at least two classification panels. Members of the classification panel must not have a relationship with the cyclist and must not be involved in the World Championships in any other role than as classifier. In national competitions, the classification is handled by the national cycling federation. Classification often has three components: physical, technical and observation assessment.

== Events ==
At the 2012 Summer Paralympics, events for this classification include T 1-2 Road Race and Mixed T 1-2 Time Trial.

== Rankings ==
This classification has UCI rankings for elite competitors.

== See also ==
- Para-cycling classification
- Cycling at the Summer Paralympics
