= Wheelchair basketball at the 2008 Summer Paralympics – Men's team rosters =

This is a list of players that participated in the men's wheelchair basketball competition at the 2008 Summer Paralympics.

== Group A ==
=== Canada ===
The following is the Canada roster in the men's wheelchair basketball tournament of the 2008 Summer Paralympics.

Canada men's national wheelchair basketball team - 2012 Summer Paralympics roster
Players
Coaches

No.	Name	Age – Date of birth	Pts.
4	Dave Durepos	40 – 14 July 1968	3.5	Elm City Sports Club	(Canada)
5	Yvon Rouillard	36 – 19 April 1972	3.0	CIVA de Montreal	(Canada)
6	Robert Hedges	28 – 5 January 1980	2.5	Douglas College	(Canada)
7	Richard Peter	35 – 10 September 1972	2.5	RSV Lahn-Dill, Douglas College	(Germany)
8	Joey Johnson	33 – 26 July 1975	4.5	RSV Lahn-Dill	(Germany)
9	Ross Norton	35 – 20 April 1973	2.0	Alberta Northern Lights	(Canada)
10	Adam Lancia	28 – 17 January 1980	4.0	BSR Valladolid, Variety Village	(Spain)
11	Jaimie Borisoff	38 – 20 June 1970	1.0	BC Cable Cars, Douglas College	(Canada)
12	Patrick Anderson	29 – 22 August 1979	4.5	BC Cable Cars, Douglas College	(Canada)
13	Chris Stoutenburg	30 – 13 September 1977	1.0	Burlington Vipers	(Canada)
10	Abdi Dini	27 – 1 January 1981	1.0	Variety Village	(Canada)
15	David Eng	31 – 21 November 1976	4.5	Laval Gladiateurs	(Canada)

Head coach

Mike Frogley
Jerry Tonello (associate)

Assistant coach(es)

Paul Bowes, Darrell Nordell, Jaimie Peers

Legend

- Age - describes age on 7 September 2008

=== Germany ===
Name
Jens Schuermann
Andreas Kress
Florian Fischer
Mimoun Quali
Bjoern Lohmann
Lars Lehmann
Andre Bienek
Lars Christink
Sebastian Wolk
Ahmet Coskun
Dirk Kohler-Lenz
Dirk Passiwan

=== Iran ===
Name
Bahman Siefi
Esmaeel Hossein Pour
Hakim Mansouri
Saman Bolaghinalou
Gholamreza Nami
Ahmad Daghaghele Pour
Ebrahim Ahmadi
Zakaria Hesamy Zadeh
Vahid Gholam Azad
Adel Torfi Meneshidi
Morteza Gharibloo
Alireza Ahmadi

=== Japan ===
Name
Kenzo Maeda
Shingo Fujii
Noriyuki Mori
Fumiharu Miura
Satoshi Sato
Tetsuya Miyajima
Kazuyuki Kyoya
Tomohiko Oshima
Keisuke Koretomo
Akimasa Suzuki
Hiroaki Kozai
Reo Fujimoto

=== South Africa ===
Name
Ralph Williams
Siphamandla Gumbi
Jeremy Nel
Marcus Retief
Shaun Hartnick
Grant Waites
Justin Govender
Thandile Zonke
Marius Papenfus
David Nathaniel Curle
Nicholas Taylor
Richard Nortje

=== Sweden ===
Name
Per Byqvist
Thomas Larsson
Niclas Larsson
Thomas Akerberg
Robin Meng
Patrik Nylander
Enoch Ablorh
Hussein Haidari
Peter Kohlstrom
Joachim Gustavsson
Joakim Linden
Dan Wallin

== Group B ==
=== Australia ===
Name
Justin Eveson
Tige Simmons
Grant Mizens
Michael Hartnett
Brendan Dowler
Dylan Alcott
Adrian King
Brett Stibners
Tristan Knowles
Troy Sachs
Shaun Norris
Brad Ness

=== Brazil ===
Name
Sergio Alexandre
Everaldo Lima
Leandro Mirando
Irio Nunes
Nilton Pessoa
Heriberto Roca
Douglas Silva
Erick Silva
Jose Marcos Silva
Jose Ricardo Silva
Gelson Silva Jr
Francisco Silva Sandoval

=== China ===
Name
Haijiang Chen
Hang Xu
Qi Chen
Yinhai Lin
Lei Zhang
Guojun Chen
Pengcheng Li
Yandong Guo
Huanjian Qu
Xunan Huang
Lei Yang
Hai Ding

=== Great Britain ===
Name
Ade Orogbemi
Andrew Blake
Kevin Hayes
Matthew Byrne
Simon Brown
Peter Finbow
Joseph Bestwick
Jonathan Hall
Abdillah Jama
Terence Bywater
Jon Pollock
Simon Munn

=== Israel ===
Name
Eyal Sar Tov
Ron Furman
Ariel Ottolenghi
Shay-Refael Haim
David Drai
Avraham Lehrman
Oon Igal Allon Dor
Rotem Philipps
Liran Hendel
Lior Dror
Roei Rozenberg
Dotan Meishar

=== United States ===
Name
Jaime Mazzi
Eric Barber
Jacob Counts
Matt Scott
Jeremy Lade
Jay Nelms
Steve Serio
Mikey Paye
Jeff Glasbrenner
Paul Schulte
Joe Chambers
Matt Lesperance
