= Wheelchair basketball at the 2012 Summer Paralympics – Men's tournament =

Men's wheelchair basketball at the XIV Paralympic Games
- Venue: Basketball Arena, North Greenwich Arena
- Dates: 30 August – 8 September 2012
- Competitors: 12 teams from 12 nations

Medalists
1st place, gold medalist(s)		Canada (CAN)
2nd place, silver medalist(s)		Australia (AUS)
3rd place, bronze medalist(s)		United States (USA)

The men's tournament in wheelchair basketball at the 2012 Summer Paralympics was held from 30 August to 8 September. Competitions were held at the newly built Basketball Arena, which seated 10,000 spectators, and North Greenwich Arena (The O2 Arena renamed to through the Games because of a no-commercialisation policy on arena names).

44 matches were played, 30 in the preliminary round, and 14 in the classification and medal rounds.

Canada beat defending champions Australia in the final, while United States beat Great Britain in the match for the bronze medal.

== Calendar ==
August September	30 – 3	4	5	6	7	8
Stage	Group stage	None	Quarter-finals; Match 9/10	Semi-finals	Semi-finals 5–8	Final; Bronze; Match 5/6; Match 7/8

== Group stage ==
=== Group A ===
Team	Pld	W	L	PF	PA	PD	Pts	Qualification
Australia	5	5	0	372	259	+113	10	Quarter-finals
Turkey	5	3	2	331	302	+29	8 (Note: Head-to-head score differential: TUR: +6; USA: −1; ESP: −5)	Quarter-finals
United States	5	3	2	330	259	+71	8	Quarter-finals
Spain	5	3	2	322	292	+30	8	Quarter-finals
Italy	5	1	4	260	309	−49	6	Eliminated
South Africa	5	0	5	204	398	−194	5	Eliminated

Rules for classification: 1) Table points, 2) Head-to-head score differential
Notes:

30 August 2012
10:45

Report

United States	50–59	Turkey
Scoring by quarter: 13–18, 12–13, 20–11, 5–17
Pts: Chambers 17; Rebs: Chambers 9 Asts: Lade 4		Pts: Gezinci 15; Rebs: Gezinci 17; Asts: Gürbulak 15

Basketball Arena, London
Referees: Chris Gregory (GBR)

30 August 2012
10:45

Report

Spain	67–40	Italy
Scoring by quarter: 19–12, 20–14, 14–8, 14–6
Pts: De Paz Pazo 18; Rebs: Garcia Moreno 11; Asts: De Paz Pazo, Muiño Gámez 5		Pts: Raimondi, Cavagnini 8 Rebs: Cavagnini 7 Asts: Raimondi, Moukhariq 3

North Greenwich Arena, London
Referees: Rui Marques (BRA)

30 August 2012
20:45

Report

Australia	93–39	South Africa
Scoring by quarter: 27–16, 20–4, 26–10, 20–9
Pts: Eveson 21; Rebs: Eveson 7 Asts: Eveson, Norris 5		Pts: Nortje 14; Rebs: Nortje 10; Asts: three players 2

Basketball Arena, London
Referees: Saskia Warmerdam (NED)

31 August 2012
15:15

Report

Italy	51–77	United States
Scoring by quarter: 10–13, 20–24, 13–20, 8–20
Pts: Moukhariq 13; Rebs: Cavagnini 9 Asts: Raimondi 5		Pts: Nelms 24; Rebs: Hinze 7 Asts: Serio 6

Basketball Arena, London
Referees: Krunoslav Peić (CRO)

31 August 2012
15:15

Report

South Africa	50–74	Spain
Scoring by quarter: 11–21, 13–20, 9–19, 17–14
Pts: Jellows, Nortje 11; Rebs: Nortje 9 Asts: Papenfus 5		Pts: Zarzuela Beltrán 24; Rebs: Zarzuela Beltrán 6 Asts: Muiño Gámez 7

North Greenwich Arena, London
Referees: Karen Molina (COL)

31 August 2012
18:30

Report

Turkey	64–71	Australia
Scoring by quarter: 15–17, 20–22, 16–16, 13–16
Pts: Gürbulak 20; Rebs: Gezinci 12; Asts: Dalay 7		Pts: Eveson, Knowles 17; Rebs: Ness 11; Asts: Norris 8

Basketball Arena, London
Referees: Sébastien Gauthier (CAN)

1 September 2012
10:45

Report

Turkey	65–60	Italy
Scoring by quarter: 21–7, 14–21, 11–10, 19–22
Pts: Gürbulak 17; Rebs: Gürbulak 14; Asts: Gürbulak 11		Pts: Cavagnini 25; Rebs: Cavagnini 15; Asts: Moukhariq 5

Basketball Arena, London
Referees: Gustavo Mathias (BRA)

1 September 2012
13:00

Report

United States	91–29	South Africa
Scoring by quarter: 30–10, 25–4, 17–8, 19–7
Pts: Scott 21; Rebs: Hinze 11; Asts: Lade 5		Pts: Nortje 11; Rebs: Nortje 7 Asts: Papenfus 5

North Greenwich Arena, London
Referees: Mauro Retiz (MEX)

1 September 2012
20:45

Report

Australia	75–59	Spain
Scoring by quarter: 20–15, 24–12, 16–23, 15–9
Pts: Norris 25; Rebs: Eveson, Latham 8 Asts: Eveson 7		Pts: García Pereiro 23; Rebs: García Pereiro 6 Asts: De Paz Pazo, Muiño Gámez 5

Basketball Arena, London
Referees: Valerie Farrugia (FRA)

2 September 2012
13:00

Report

South Africa	32–61	Italy
Scoring by quarter: 12–13, 2–12, 13–12, 5–24
Pts: Nortje 15; Rebs: Mbande 7 Asts: Mbande 3		Pts: Cavagnini 33; Rebs: Cavagnini 17; Asts: Moukhariq 7

Basketball Arena, London
Referees: Eisuke Kanno (JPN)

2 September 2012
19:00

Report

Australia	65–49	United States
Scoring by quarter: 13–12, 14–8, 18–13, 20–16
Pts: Norris 16; Rebs: Eveson 16; Asts: Eveson 9		Pts: Turek, Nelms 8 Rebs: Jenifer, Scott 7 Asts: Serio 7

North Greenwich Arena, London
Referees: Sergio Giordano (CAN)

2 September 2012
20:45

Report

Spain	67–64	Turkey
Scoring by quarter: 13–14, 14–16, 21–13, 19–21
Pts: De Paz Pazo 19; Rebs: De Paz Pazo, Zarzuela Beltrán 7 Asts: de Paz Pazo 8		Pts: Gürbulak 18; Rebs: Gürbulak 9 Asts: Gürbulak 4

Basketball Arena, London
Referees: Krunoslav Peić (CRO)

3 September 2012
15:15

Report

Italy	48–68	Australia
Scoring by quarter: 11–15, 10–18, 17–24, 10–11
Pts: Cavagnini 16; Rebs: Pellegrini 12; Asts: Moukhariq 5		Pts: Stibners 17; Rebs: Eveson, Latham 6 Asts: Norris 5

Basketball Arena, London
Referees: Saskia Warmerdam (NED)

3 September 2012
19:00

Report

Turkey	79–54	South Africa
Scoring by quarter: 18–10, 16–18, 20–12, 25–14
Pts: Gezinci 21; Rebs: Gezinci 9 Asts: Gümüş 5		Pts: Nortje 24; Rebs: Nortje 9 Asts: Papenfus 9

North Greenwich Arena, London
Referees: Mati Quintana (ARG)

3 September 2012
21:15

Report

United States	63–55	Spain
Scoring by quarter: 15–14, 19–10, 16–15, 13–16
Pts: Nelms 21; Rebs: Jenifer 9 Asts: three players 5		Pts: Muiño Gámez 15; Rebs: Romero Martín 7 Asts: De Paz Pazo 5

North Greenwich Arena, London
Referees: Max Kindervater (GER)

=== Group B ===
Team	Pld	W	L	PF	PA	PD	Pts	Qualification
Canada	5	5	0	362	280	+82	10	Quarter-finals
Germany	5	4	1	339	303	+36	9	Quarter-finals
Great Britain	5	3	2	365	301	+64	8	Quarter-finals
Poland	5	2	3	327	341	−14	7	Quarter-finals
Japan	5	1	4	273	330	−57	6	Eliminated
Colombia	5	0	5	223	334	−111	5	Eliminated

30 August 2012
13:00

Report

Japan	53–68	Canada
Scoring by quarter: 11–16, 10–19, 10–18, 22–15
Pts: Fujimoto 16; Rebs: Fujimoto 11; Asts: Kozai 5		Pts: Anderson 32; Rebs: Anderson 13; Asts: Peter, Anderson 3

Basketball Arena, London
Referees: Cristian Roja (ITA)

30 August 2012
15:15

Report

Colombia	45–63	Poland
Scoring by quarter: 11–16, 18–14, 8–14, 8–19
Pts: Sanz Londono 21; Rebs: Sanz Londono 8 Asts: Ipema 4		Pts: Filipski, Balcerowski 18; Rebs: Luszynski 12; Asts: Luszynski 12

Basketball Arena, London
Referees: Matt Wells (AUS)

30 August 2012
19:00

Report

Great Britain	72–77 (OT)	Germany
Scoring by quarter: 10–21, 17–13, 23–13, 16–19, Overtime: 6–11
Pts: Munn 21; Rebs: Munn 14; Asts: Bywater 9		Pts: Passiwan 26; Rebs: Bienek 11; Asts: Bienek 12

North Greenwich Arena, London
Referees: Juan Uruñuela (ESP)

31 August 2012
10:45

Report

Germany	59–46	Colombia
Scoring by quarter: 17–6, 21–8, 9–15, 12–17
Pts: Wolk 13; Rebs: Passiwan 8 Asts: Passiwan 8		Pts: Hawkins 16; Rebs: Hawkins 19; Asts: Sanz Londono 7

Basketball Arena, London
Referees: Sergio Giordano (CAN)

31 August 2012
10:45

Report

Poland	78–53	Japan
Scoring by quarter: 21–10, 22–10, 21–19, 14–14
Pts: Filipski 24; Rebs: Luszynski 17; Asts: Filipski 10		Pts: Fujimoto 18; Rebs: Fujimoto 9 Asts: Kozai 4

North Greenwich Arena, London
Referees: Cristian Salguero (ARG)

31 August 2012
21:15

Report

Canada	70–54	Great Britain
Scoring by quarter: 20–11, 14–18, 18–7, 18–18
Pts: Anderson 29; Rebs: Anderson 10; Asts: Anderson 14		Pts: Choudhry 11; Rebs: Highcock 7 Asts: Orogbemi 6

North Greenwich Arena, London
Referees: Max Kindervater (GER)

1 September 2012
15:15

Report

Japan	49–64	Germany
Scoring by quarter: 18–14, 7–13, 13–11, 11–26
Pts: Fujimoto 13; Rebs: Kozai 8 Asts: Kozai 7		Pts: Köhler 16; Rebs: Böhme 12; Asts: Bienek 8

Basketball Arena, London
Referees: Nureddin Bilmez (TUR)

1 September 2012
19:00

Report

Great Britain	81–41	Colombia
Scoring by quarter: 25–13, 21–8, 18–11, 17–9
Pts: Bywater 21; Rebs: Sagar 11; Asts: Bywater 8		Pts: Sanz Londoño 14; Rebs: Hawkins 12; Asts: Leep Ipema, Chaparro 3

North Greenwich Arena, London
Referees: Shu Fei Hsieh (TPE)

1 September 2012
21:15

Report

Canada	83–65	Poland
Scoring by quarter: 16–18, 23–17, 18–12, 26–18
Pts: Anderson 34; Rebs: Anderson 9 Asts: Anderson 12		Pts: Filipski 20; Rebs: Łuszyński 7 Asts: Filipski, Łuszyński 7

North Greenwich Arena, London
Referees: Phil Haines (AUS)

2 September 2012
10:45

Report

Colombia	49–63	Japan
Scoring by quarter: 14–22, 11–13, 8–13, 16–15
Pts: Sanz Londoño 14; Rebs: Hawkins 17; Asts: Sanz Londoño, Chaparro 5		Pts: Fujimoto 27; Rebs: Fujimoto 14; Asts: Fujii, Kozai 7

North Greenwich Arena, London
Referees: Juan Uruñuela (ESP)

2 September 2012
15:15

Report

Germany	66–73	Canada
Scoring by quarter: 18–17, 10–19, 19–17, 19–20
Pts: Passiwan 29; Rebs: Passiwan 8 Asts: Passiwan 8		Pts: Anderson 25; Rebs: Anderson 15; Asts: Anderson 12

Basketball Arena, London
Referees: Matt Wells (AUS)

2 September 2012
18:30

Report

Poland	58–87	Great Britain
Scoring by quarter: 10–22, 14–23, 19–25, 15–17
Pts: Balcerowski 11; Rebs: Filipski 7 Asts: Filipski 5		Pts: Bywater 22; Rebs: Sagar 8 Asts: Hall 6

Basketball Arena, London
Referees: Rui Marques (BRA)

3 September 2012
10:45

Report

Canada	68–42	Colombia
Scoring by quarter: 21–8, 21–16, 13–4, 13–14
Pts: Durepos 18; Rebs: Johnson 6 Asts: Hedges 6		Pts: Hawkins 12; Rebs: Londoño 9 Asts: Chaparro 6

North Greenwich Arena, London
Referees: Philip Haines (AUS)

3 September 2012
15:15

Report

Japan	55–71	Great Britain
Scoring by quarter: 14–25, 10–21, 13–14, 18–11
Pts: Fujimoto 20; Rebs: Kozai, Fujimoto 5 Asts: Kozai 7		Pts: Bywater 19; Rebs: Munn 9 Asts: Bywater, Pollock 5

North Greenwich Arena, London
Referees: Matt Wells (AUS)

3 September 2012
20:45

Report

Germany	73–63	Poland
Scoring by quarter: 11–15, 18–22, 15–14, 29–12
Pts: Haller 17; Rebs: Bienek 10; Asts: Passiwan, Bienek 6		Pts: Filipski 27; Rebs: Luszynski 10; Asts: Luszynski 8

Basketball Arena, London
Referees: Juan Uruñuela (ESP)

== Second round ==
=== 11th/12th place match ===
5 September 2012
8:30

Report

South Africa	36–83	Colombia
Scoring by quarter: 11–18, 7–19, 4–22, 14–24
Pts: Nortje 14; Rebs: Nortje 7 Asts: Nortje 4		Pts: Sanz Londoño 30; Rebs: Hawkins 16; Asts: Sanz Londoño 6

North Greenwich Arena, London
Referees: Philip Haines (AUS)

=== 9th/10th place match ===
5 September 2012
10:45

Report

Italy	60–64	Japan
Scoring by quarter: 13–20, 18–18, 14–15, 15–11
Pts: Cavagnini 31; Rebs: Cavagnini 6 Asts: Raimondi 5		Pts: Masubuchi 14; Rebs: Fujimoto 10; Asts: Fujimoto 5

North Greenwich Arena, London
Referees: Mati Quintana (ARG)

=== Quarter-finals ===
5 September 2012
13:00

Report

Germany	46–57	United States
Scoring by quarter: 11–14, 17–11, 9–12, 9–20
Pts: Bienek 18; Rebs: Bienek 13; Asts: three players 3		Pts: three players 10; Rebs: Turek 8 Asts: Schulte 6

North Greenwich Arena, London
Referees: Christopher Gregory (GBR)

5 September 2012
15:15

Report

Turkey	70–75	Great Britain
Scoring by quarter: 14–16, 16–16, 15–22, 25–21
Pts: Gürbulak 28; Rebs: Ercan 10; Asts: Gürbulak 9		Pts: Bywater 23; Rebs: Pollock 9 Asts: Bywater 13

North Greenwich Arena, London
Referees: Juan Uruñuela (ESP)

5 September 2012
19:00

Report

Canada	77–51	Spain
Scoring by quarter: 25–12, 18–13, 14–16, 20–10
Pts: Anderson 16; Rebs: Anderson 14; Asts: Durepos, Anderson 6		Pts: García Moreno 16; Rebs: Zarzuela Beltrán 6 Asts: García Moreno 5

North Greenwich Arena, London
Referees: Matt Wells (AUS)

5 September 2012
21:15

Report

Australia	76–53	Poland
Scoring by quarter: 26–11, 13–17, 21–18, 16–7
Pts: Ness 26; Rebs: Norris, Ness 5 Asts: Eveson 6		Pts: Filipski 26; Rebs: Filipski 10; Asts: Filipski 8

North Greenwich Arena, London
Referees: Sergio Giordano (CAN)

== Classification round ==
5th–8th place semi-finals
Poland	66
Germany	81
Turkey	78
Spain	86

5th/6th place match
Germany	48
Spain	67
7th/8th place match
Poland	74
Turkey	76

=== 5th–8th place semi-finals ===
7 September 2012
13:00

Report

Poland	66–81	Germany
Scoring by quarter: 17–18, 16–24, 15–20, 18–19
Pts: Filipski 31; Rebs: Balcerowski 9 Asts: Luszynski 9		Pts: Passiwan 30; Rebs: Passiwan 10; Asts: Haller 8

North Greenwich Arena, London
Referees: Sébastien Gauthier (CAN)

7 September 2012
15:15

Report

Turkey	78–86 (OT)	Spain
Scoring by quarter: 21–18, 16–22, 12–12, 19–16, Overtime: 10–18
Pts: Gürbulak, Gümüş 24; Rebs: Gümüş 9 Asts: Gürbulak 9		Pts: De Paz Pazo 24; Rebs: De Paz Pazo 12; Asts: García Pereiro 10

North Greenwich Arena, London
Referees: Christopher Gregory (GBR)

=== 7th/8th place match ===
8 September 2012
13:00

Report

Poland	74–76	Turkey
Scoring by quarter: 14–12, 21–22, 20–21, 19–21
Pts: Filipski 28; Rebs: Mosler 11; Asts: Filipski 15		Pts: Gümüş 30; Rebs: Gümüş 9 Asts: Gürbulak 13

North Greenwich Arena, London
Referees: Carsten Rehling (GER)

=== 5th/6th place match ===
8 September 2012
15:15

Report

Germany	48–67	Spain
Scoring by quarter: 9–10, 14–16, 12–18, 13–23
Pts: Bienek 14; Rebs: Bienek 5 Asts: Wolk 10		Pts: De Paz Pazo 17; Rebs: De Paz Pazo 6 Asts: De Paz Pazo 9

North Greenwich Arena, London
Referees: Christopher Gregory (GBR)

== Medal round ==
Quarter-finals
Australia	76
Poland	53
Germany	46
United States	57
Turkey	70
Great Britain	75
Canada	77
Spain	51

Semi-finals
Australia	72
United States	63
Great Britain	52
Canada	69

Final
Australia	58
Canada	64
Third place
United States	61
Great Britain	46

=== Semi-finals ===
6 September 2012
19:00

Report

Australia	72–63	United States
Scoring by quarter: 18–8, 17–23, 17–14, 20–18
Pts: Eveson 21; Rebs: Eveson 10; Asts: Norris 8		Pts: Chambers 12; Rebs: Lade, Waller 4 Asts: Serio, Schulte 5

North Greenwich Arena, London
Referees: Cris Salguero (ARG)

6 September 2012
21:15

Report

Great Britain	52–69	Canada
Scoring by quarter: 16–21, 11–12, 10–24, 15–12
Pts: Orogbemi 14; Rebs: Bywater, Sagar 5 Asts: Pollock 5		Pts: Anderson 17; Rebs: Johnson 14; Asts: Anderson 11

North Greenwich Arena, London
Referees: Mati Quintana (ARG)

=== Bronze medal match ===
8 September 2012
19:00

Report

United States	61–46	Great Britain
Scoring by quarter: 17–10, 12–10, 10–13, 22–13
Pts: Serio 20; Rebs: Scott 8 Asts: Serio 8		Pts: Bywater 14; Rebs: Bywater 12; Asts: Orogbemi 5

North Greenwich Arena, London
Referees: Matt Wells (AUS)

=== Gold medal match ===
8 September 2012
21:15

Report

Australia	58–64	Canada
Scoring by quarter: 15–14, 12–12, 15–20, 16–18
Pts: Norris 19; Rebs: Eveson 8 Asts: Eveson 5		Pts: Anderson 34; Rebs: Anderson 10; Asts: Anderson 8

North Greenwich Arena, London
Referees: Juan Uruñuela (ESP)

== Ranking ==
Place	Team
1st place, gold medalist(s)	Canada
2nd place, silver medalist(s)	Australia
3rd place, bronze medalist(s)	United States
4.	Great Britain
5.	Spain
6.	Germany
7.	Turkey
8.	Poland
9.	Japan
10.	Italy
11.	Colombia
12.	South Africa

== See also ==
- Wheelchair basketball at the 2012 Summer Paralympics – Women's tournament

== Sources ==
- "London 2012 Paralympic Game, Wheelchair Basketball: Men". Official Website of the Paralympic Movement. 2012.
- "Schedule and Results - Wheelchair Basketball". The London Organizing Committee for the Games of the XXX Olympiad. 2012. Archived from the original on 2012-09-03.
