= Japan at the 2012 Summer Paralympics =

- IPC code: JPN
- NPC: Japan Paralympic Committee
- Website: www.jsad.or.jp (in Japanese)

in London
- Competitors: 116
- Medals Ranked 24th: Gold 5 Silver 5 Bronze 6 Total 16

Summer Paralympics appearances (overview)
- 1964; 1968; 1972; 1976; 1980; 1984; 1988; 1992; 1996; 2000; 2004; 2008; 2012; 2016; 2020; 2024

Japan competed at the 2012 Summer Paralympics in London. Japan's team consisted of 116 competitors.

== Medalists ==
Medal	Name	Sport	Event	Date
Gold	Kento Masaki	Judo	Men's +100 kg	1 September
Gold	Rina Akiyama	Swimming	Women's 100 metre backstroke S11	2 September
Gold	Yasuhiro Tanaka	Swimming	Men's 100 metre breaststroke SB14	6 September
Gold	Masae Komiya; Rie Urata; Akane Nakashima; Eiko Kakehata; Haruka Wakasugi; Akiko Adachi	Goalball	Women's tournament	7 September
Gold	Shingo Kunieda	Wheelchair tennis	Men's Singles	8 September
Silver	Tomotaro Nakamura	Swimming	Men's 100 metre breaststroke SB7	1 September
Silver	Keiichi Kimura	Swimming	Men's 100 metre breaststroke SB11	3 September
Silver	Tomoya Ito	Athletics	Men's 400 metres T52	3 September
Silver	Tomoya Ito	Athletics	Men's 800 metres T52	7 September
Silver	Tomoya Ito	Athletics	Men's 200 metres T52	8 September
Bronze	Takayuki Suzuki	Swimming	Men's 150 metre individual medley SM4	2 September
Bronze	Takayuki Suzuki	Swimming	Men's 50 metre breaststroke SB3	3 September
Bronze	Keiichi Kimura	Swimming	Men's 100 metre butterfly S11	6 September
Bronze	Masaki Fujita	Cycling	Men's road time trial C3	5 September
Bronze	Kyosuke Oyama	Swimming	Men's 50 metre butterfly S6	7 September
Bronze	Shinya Wada	Athletics	Men's 5000 metres T11	7 September

== Archery ==
Men

Athlete	Event	Ranking round		Round of 32	Round of 16	Quarterfinals	Semifinals	Finals	
Athlete	Event	Score	Seed	Opposition score	Opposition score	Opposition score	Opposition score	Opposition score	Rank
Shinichi Saito	Ind. compound W1	563	11	—N/a	Murphy (CAN) (6); L 2–6	did not advance			
Yutaka Ajima	Ind. recurve W1/W2	539	22	Rodriguez (ESP) (11); L 0–6	did not advance				

Women

Athlete	Event	Ranking round		Round of 32	Round of 16	Quarterfinals	Semifinals	Finals	
Athlete	Event	Score	Seed	Opposition score	Opposition score	Opposition score	Opposition score	Opposition score	Rank
Miho Nagano	Ind. compound open	614	11	—N/a	van Nest (CAN) (6); W 6–5	Clarke (GBR) (3); L 4–6	did not advance		

== Boccia ==
Individual

Athlete	Event	Seeding matches	Round of 32	Round of 16	Quarter-finals	Semi-finals	Final	
Athlete	Event	Opposition Result	Opposition Result	Opposition Result	Opposition Result	Opposition Result	Opposition Result	Rank
Yuriko Shibayama	Individual BC1	Bye	Richardson (CAN); W 5–0	Smith (GBR); L 4–6	did not advance			
Takayuki Hirose	Individual BC2	Bye	Mello de Faria (BRA); W 12–0	Murray (GBR); L 0–8	did not advance			
Hidetaka Sugimura	Individual BC2	Bye	Vongsa (THA); L 5–5	did not advance				
Keita Kato	Individual BC3	Hanson (USA); L 1–6	Cilissen (BEL); L 1–5	did not advance				

Teams

Athlete	Event	Group stage			Quarter-finals	Semi-finals	Final	
Athlete	Event	Opposition Result	Opposition Result	Rank	Opposition Result	Opposition Result	Opposition Result	Rank
Taemi Akimoto; Yuriko Shibayama; Takayuki Hirose; Hidetaka Sugimura	Team BC1-2	Hong Kong (HKG); W 7–6	Spain (ESP); W 8–3	1 Q	Portugal (POR); L 2–10	did not advance		

== Cycling ==
=== Track ===
Pursuit

Athlete	Event	Qualification		Final	
Athlete	Event	Time	Rank	Opposition Time	Rank
Masaki Fujita	Men's individual pursuit C3	3:51.743	9	did not advance	
Masashi Ishii	Men's individual pursuit C4	5:02.100	9	did not advance	

Sprint

Athlete	Event	Qualification		Quarter-finals	Semi-finals	Final	
Athlete	Event	Time	Rank	Opposition Time	Opposition Time	Opposition Time	Rank
Tatsuyuki Oshiro; Yasufumi Ito (pilot)	Men's individual sprint B	10.639	5	Oost/Bos (NED) (4); W 10.935, L REL, W 11.002	Kappes/MacLean (GBR) (1); L, L	Bronze medal match Porto/Villanueva (ESP) (3); L, L	4

Time trial

Athlete	Event	Time	Rank
Tatsuyuki Oshiro; Yasufumi Ito (pilot)	Men's 1 km time trial B	1:04.266	6
Masaki Fujita	Men's 1 km time trial C1–3	1:14.998	20
Masashi Ishii	Men's 1 km time trial C4–5	1:09.241	6

=== Road ===
Athlete	Event	Time	Rank
Masaki Fujita	Men's road race C1-3	1:42:51	12
Masaki Fujita	Men's road time trial C3	23:55.54	3rd place, bronze medalist(s)
Masashi Ishii	Men's road time trial C4	37:07.11	11

== Equestrian ==
Individual

Athlete	Horse	Event	Total	
Athlete	Horse	Event	Score	Rank
Nobumasa Asakawa	Rosado	Ind. champ. test grade Ib	62.826	12
Nobumasa Asakawa	Rosado	Ind. freestyle test grade Ib	64.250	12

== Goalball ==
=== Women's tournament ===
Group C

Team	Pld	W	D	L	GF	GA	GD	Pts	Qualification
Canada	4	3	0	1	6	3	+3	9	Quarterfinals
Japan	4	2	1	1	5	3	+2	7	Quarterfinals
Sweden	4	2	1	1	11	11	0	7	Quarterfinals
United States	4	2	0	2	9	4	+5	6	Quarterfinals
Australia	4	0	0	4	7	17	−10	0	Eliminated

Source: "London 2012 Paralympic Games - Goalball results" (PDF). Paralympic.org. 2012-10-03 – via Goalball.sport.

31 August 2012; 09:00	Australia	1 – 3	Japan	Copper Box, London; Referees: Hooshang Shariati (IRI), Yasser Omar (EGY)
31 August 2012; 09:00	Esdaile 1	Report	Adacho 2 Komiya 1	Copper Box, London; Referees: Hooshang Shariati (IRI), Yasser Omar (EGY)

1 September 2012; 15:00	Japan	2 – 1	United States	Copper Box, London

2 September 2012; 11:30	Sweden	0 – 0	Japan	Copper Box, London; Referees: Tony Collonny (USA), Christl Däntler (GER)
2 September 2012; 11:30		Report		Copper Box, London; Referees: Tony Collonny (USA), Christl Däntler (GER)

3 September 2012; 19:45	Japan	0 – 1	Canada	Copper Box, London

Quarter-final

5 September 2012; 10:30	Japan	2 – 0	Brazil	Copper Box, London
5 September 2012; 10:30		Report		Copper Box, London

Semi-final

6 September 2012; 15:00	Sweden	3 – 4 (a.e.t.)	Japan	Copper Box, London; Referees: Dina Murdie (GBR), Launel Scott (CAN)
6 September 2012; 15:00	Gustavsson 1 Jälmestål 1 Wåglund 1	Report	Komiya 2 Adachi 1 Urata 1	Copper Box, London; Referees: Dina Murdie (GBR), Launel Scott (CAN)

Final

7 September 2012; 15:00	China	0 – 1	Japan	Copper Box, London
7 September 2012; 15:00		Report	Adachi 1	Copper Box, London

== Powerlifting ==
Men

Athlete	Event	Result	Rank
Hiroshi Miura	48 kg	117	9
Hideki Odo	82.5 kg	191	6
Hajime Ujiro	75 kg	180	7

== Rowing ==
Athlete	Event	Heats		Repechage		Finals	
Athlete	Event	Time	Rank	Time	Rank	Time	Rank
Mari Ohtake	Women's single sculls	6:44.67	6 R	7:02.53	5 FB	6:50.67	5

== Sailing ==
Athlete	Event	Race											Net points	Rank
Athlete	Event	1	2	3	4	5	6	7	8	9	10	11*	Net points	Rank
Katsuya Nishiyama; Shin'ya Yamamoto (sailor); Tsuneo Aso	Sonar - 3 person keelboat	(14)	14	13	13	14	12	14	14	14	14	—N/a	121	14

* Due to a lack of wind race 11 was cancelled

== Shooting ==
Athlete	Event	Qualification		Final	
Athlete	Event	Score	Rank	Score	Rank
Akiko Sega	Mixed 10 m air rifle prone SH2	598	21	did not advance	
Aki Taguchi	Mixed 10 m air rifle prone SH1	589	44	did not advance	
Aki Taguchi	Mixed 50 m rifle prone SH1	581	22	did not advance	

== Sitting volleyball ==
=== Women's tournament ===
Roster

The following is the Japanese roster in the women's volleyball tournament of the 2012 Summer Paralympics.

№	Name	Date of birth	Position	2012 club
1	Michiyo Nichiie	12 March 1967		(Japan) Soul
2	Sachie Awano	13 September 1988		(Japan) Hyogo LSC
3	Yukari Okahira	9 March 1968		(Japan) Hyogo LSC
4	Junko Fujii	3 April 1966		(Japan) Saitama Red Beads Venus
5	Yoko Saito	21 September 1972		(Japan) Tokyo Planets Megumi
6	Shiori Ogata	5 November 1985		(Japan) Tokyo Planets Megumi
7	Emi Kaneki	6 March 1982		(Japan) Kobe Jets
8	Noriko Kaneda	21 February 1964		(Japan) Tochigi Thunders
9	Satoko Kikuchi	28 April 1980		(Japan) Hyogo LSC
10	Mamiko Osada	23 July 1967		(Japan) Tokyo Planets Megumi
11	Harumi Sakamoto	15 June 1967		(Japan) Tokyo Planets Megumi

Group A

Pos	Team	Pld	W	L	Pts	SW	SL	SR	SPW	SPL	SPR
1	Ukraine	3	3	0	6	9	1	9.000	241	167	1.443
2	Netherlands	3	2	1	5	7	4	1.750	251	201	1.249
3	Japan	3	1	2	4	4	6	0.667	190	218	0.872
4	Great Britain	3	0	3	3	0	9	0.000	129	225	0.573

31 August 2012; 19:00	Netherlands	3–1	Japan	ExCeL London, London; Referees: Amin Al-Traifi (KSA), Dominik Raca (CRO)
31 August 2012; 19:00	(22–25, 25–18, 25–13, 25–14); Report			ExCeL London, London; Referees: Amin Al-Traifi (KSA), Dominik Raca (CRO)

2 September 2012; 19:00	Great Britain	0–3	Japan	ExCeL London, London; Referees: Dariusz Jasinski (POL), Anton Probst (GER)
2 September 2012; 19:00	(11–25, 21–25, 14–25); Report			ExCeL London, London; Referees: Dariusz Jasinski (POL), Anton Probst (GER)

3 September 2012; 16:00	Ukraine	3–0	Japan	ExCeL London, London; Referees: Ronaldo Chaves (BRA), Joe Campbell (USA)
3 September 2012; 16:00	(25–20, 25–9, 25–16); Report			ExCeL London, London; Referees: Ronaldo Chaves (BRA), Joe Campbell (USA)

5th–8th place semi-final

4 September 2012; 21:00	Japan	0–3	Slovenia	ExCeL London, London; Referees: France Marcoux (CAN), Dee Wauchope (GBR)
4 September 2012; 21:00	(19–25, 22–25, 20–25); Report			ExCeL London, London; Referees: France Marcoux (CAN), Dee Wauchope (GBR)

7th/8th place match

6 September 2012; 9:00	Great Britain	0–3	Japan	ExCeL London, London; Referees: Dimosthenis Kostopoulos (GRE), Janko Plesnik (SLO)
6 September 2012; 9:00	(23–25, 19–25, 13–25); Report			ExCeL London, London; Referees: Dimosthenis Kostopoulos (GRE), Janko Plesnik (SLO)

== Table tennis ==
Men's singles

Athlete	Event	Preliminaries			Quarter-finals	Semi-finals	Finals	
Athlete	Event	Opposition Result	Opposition Result	Rank	Opposition Result	Opposition Result	Opposition Result	Rank
Junki Itai	Singles class 6	Fernandez (FRA); L 2–3	Chen (CHN); L 0–3	3	did not advance			
Yuki Kinoshita	Singles class 11	Palos (HUN); L 0–3	Son (KOR); L 0–3	3	—N/a	did not advance		

Women's singles

Athlete	Event	Preliminaries			Semi-finals	Finals	
Athlete	Event	Opposition Result	Opposition Result	Rank	Opposition Result	Opposition Result	Rank
Kimie Bessho	Singles class 5	Makishi (ARG); W 3–0	Abuawad (JOR); L 0–3	2	did not advance		

== Wheelchair basketball ==
=== Men's tournament ===
Group B

Team	Pld	W	L	PF	PA	PD	Pts	Qualification
Canada	5	5	0	362	280	+82	10	Quarter-finals
Germany	5	4	1	339	303	+36	9	Quarter-finals
Great Britain	5	3	2	365	301	+64	8	Quarter-finals
Poland	5	2	3	327	341	−14	7	Quarter-finals
Japan	5	1	4	273	330	−57	6	Eliminated
Colombia	5	0	5	223	334	−111	5	Eliminated

30 August 2012
13:00

Report

Japan	53–68	Canada
Scoring by quarter: 11–16, 10–19, 10–18, 22–15
Pts: Fujimoto 16; Rebs: Fujimoto 11; Asts: Kozai 5		Pts: Anderson 32; Rebs: Anderson 13; Asts: Peter, Anderson 3

Basketball Arena, London
Referees: Cristian Roja (ITA)

31 August 2012
10:45

Report

Poland	78–53	Japan
Scoring by quarter: 21–10, 22–10, 21–19, 14–14
Pts: Filipski 24; Rebs: Luszynski 17; Asts: Filipski 10		Pts: Fujimoto 18; Rebs: Fujimoto 9 Asts: Kozai 4

North Greenwich Arena, London
Referees: Cristian Salguero (ARG)

1 September 2012
15:15

Report

Japan	49–64	Germany
Scoring by quarter: 18–14, 7–13, 13–11, 11–26
Pts: Fujimoto 13; Rebs: Kozai 8 Asts: Kozai 7		Pts: Köhler 16; Rebs: Böhme 12; Asts: Bienek 8

Basketball Arena, London
Referees: Nureddin Bilmez (TUR)

2 September 2012
10:45

Report

Colombia	49–63	Japan
Scoring by quarter: 14–22, 11–13, 8–13, 16–15
Pts: Sanz Londoño 14; Rebs: Hawkins 17; Asts: Sanz Londoño, Chaparro 5		Pts: Fujimoto 27; Rebs: Fujimoto 14; Asts: Fujii, Kozai 7

North Greenwich Arena, London
Referees: Juan Uruñuela (ESP)

3 September 2012
15:15

Report

Japan	55–71	Great Britain
Scoring by quarter: 14–25, 10–21, 13–14, 18–11
Pts: Fujimoto 20; Rebs: Kozai, Fujimoto 5 Asts: Kozai 7		Pts: Bywater 19; Rebs: Munn 9 Asts: Bywater, Pollock 5

North Greenwich Arena, London
Referees: Matt Wells (AUS)

9th/10th place match

5 September 2012
10:45

Report

Italy	60–64	Japan
Scoring by quarter: 13–20, 18–18, 14–15, 15–11
Pts: Cavagnini 31; Rebs: Cavagnini 6 Asts: Raimondi 5		Pts: Masubuchi 14; Rebs: Fujimoto 10; Asts: Fujimoto 5

North Greenwich Arena, London
Referees: Mati Quintana (ARG)

== Wheelchair rugby ==
Group stage

Team	Pld	W	D	L	GF	GA	GD	Pts	Qualification
United States (USA)	3	3	0	0	190	136	+54	6	Semifinals
Japan (JPN)	3	2	0	1	164	159	+5	4	Semifinals
Great Britain (GBR)	3	1	0	2	140	157	−17	2	Eliminated
France (FRA)	3	0	0	3	150	192	−42	0	Eliminated

5 September 2012
21:15

Japan	65 – 56	France
	Report

Basketball Arena
Attendance: 3,642
Referee: Mitch Carr (USA), Alexander Schreiner (GER)

6 September 2012
21:15

Japan	48 – 64	United States
	Report

Basketball Arena
Attendance: 2,959
Referee: Philip Washbourn (NZL), Dave Woods (GBR)

7 September 2012
15:00

Great Britain	39 – 51	Japan
	Report

Basketball Arena
Attendance: 8,458
Referee: Mitch Carr (USA), Philip Washbourn (NZL)

Semi-finals

8 September 2012
14:00

Australia	59 – 45	Japan
Batt – 27; Bond – 14; Smith – 6 Scott – 2 Lees – 2 Meakin – 2 Newton – 1 Carr – 1 Harrison – 1 Team – 3	Report	Ikezakli – 24; Nakazato – 7 Kanno – 6 Shimakawa – 4 Sato – 2 Team – 2

Basketball Arena
Attendance: 5,333
Referee: Mitch Carr (USA), Darren Roberts (USA)

Bronze medal match

9 September 2012
12:00

United States	53 – 43	Japan
	Report

Basketball Arena
Attendance: 7,852
Referee: Pierre-Alexandre Briére (CAN), Philip Washbourn (NZL)

== See also ==
- Japan at the 2012 Summer Olympics
