= Wheelchair basketball at the 2008 Summer Paralympics =

Wheelchair basketball at the XIII Paralympic Games
- Paralympic Wheelchair Basketball
- Venue: Beijing National Indoor Stadium
- Dates: 7 September - 16 September 2008

Medalists
| 1st place, gold medalist(s) | | Australia (AUS) (men); United States (USA) (women) |
| 2nd place, silver medalist(s) | | Canada (CAN) (men); Germany (GER) (women) |
| 3rd place, bronze medalist(s) | | Great Britain (GBR) (men); Australia (AUS) (women) |

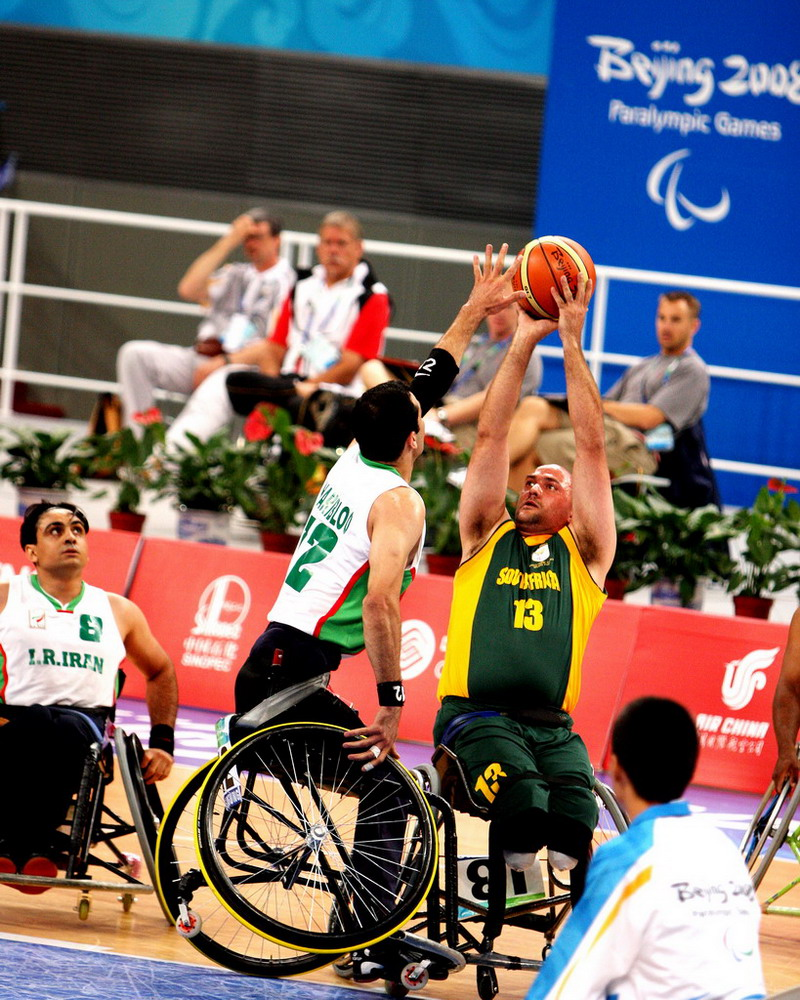
Wheelchair basketball match between South Africa and Iran

The Wheelchair Basketball competition of the 2008 Summer Paralympics is held in Beijing National Indoor Stadium and Beijing Science and Technology University Gymnasium between September 7, 2008 and September 16, 2008. There will be two medals awarded in this event.

== Medalists ==
| Event | Gold | Silver | Bronze |
|---|---|---|---|
| Men's team | Australia (AUS) Dylan Alcott; Brendan Dowler; Justin Eveson; Michael Hartnett; Adrian King; Tristan Knowles; Grant Mizens; Brad Ness (captain); Shaun Norris; Troy Sachs; Tige Simmons; Brett Stibners; Coach: Ben Ettridge | Canada (CAN) Patrick Anderson; Jaimie Borisoff (captain); Abditatch Dini; David Durepos; David Eng; Robert Hedges; Joey Johnson; Adam Lancia; Ross Norton; Richard Peter; Yvon Rouillard; Chris Stoutenberg; Coach: Mike Frogley | Great Britain (GBR) Joseph Bestwick; Andrew Blake; Simon Brown; Matthew Byrne; Terence Bywater; Peter Finbow; Jonathan Hall; Kevin Hayes; Abdillah Jama; Simon Munn; Ade Orogbemi; Jon Pollock (captain); Coach: Sinclair Richford Thomas |
| Women's team | United States (USA) Sarah Castle; Patty Cisneros (captain); Loraine Gonzales; Carlee Hoffman; Emily Hoskins; Mary Allison Milford; Rebecca Murray; Alana Nichols; Christina Ripp; Jen Ruddell; Natalie Schneider; Stephanie Wheeler; Coach: Ronald Lykins | Germany (GER) Alke Behrens; Maren Butterbrodt; Annette Kahl (captain); Britta Kautz; Simone Kues; Birgit Meitner; Marina Mohnen; Edina Anita Muller; Nora Schratz; Gesche Schunemann; Nicole Seifert; Annika Zeyen; Coach: Holger Ingo Glinicki | Australia (AUS) Clare Burzynski; Shelley Chaplin; Cobi Crispin; Melanie Domaschenz; Kylie Gauci; Melanie Hall; Katie Hill; Bridie Kean; Tina McKenzie; Kathleen O'Kelly-Kennedy; Sarah Stewart; Liesl Tesch (captain); Coach: Gerry Hewson |

Source: Paralympic.org

== Classification ==
Classification is an important element that will ensure athletes can compete in a fair situation.

A certain committee will give athletes who can take part in this sport an eight-level-score specific to basketball, ranging from 1 to 4.5. Lower scores represent a larger disability. The sum score of all players on the court cannot exceed 14.

== Teams ==
There will be 12 male teams and 10 female teams taking part in this sport.

=== Men's ===
| Team | Qualification |
|---|---|
| South Africa (RSA) | IWBF Africa Qualify Tournament |
| Australia (AUS) | IWBF Asian-Oceania Qualify Tournament |
| Iran (IRI) | IWBF Asian-Oceania Qualify Tournament |
| Japan (JPN) | IWBF Asian-Oceania Qualify Tournament |
| Brazil (BRA) | 2007 Parapan American Games |
| Canada (CAN) | 2007 Parapan American Games |
| United States (USA) | 2007 Parapan American Games |
| Germany (GER) | IWBF Europe Qualify Tournament |
| Great Britain (GBR) | IWBF Europe Qualify Tournament |
| Sweden (SWE) | IWBF Europe Qualify Tournament |
| Israel (ISR) | IWBF Europe Qualify Tournament |
| China (CHN) | Host nation |

=== Women's ===
| Team | Qualification |
|---|---|
| Australia (AUS) | IWBF Asian-Oceania Qualify Tournament |
| Japan (JPN) | IWBF Asian-Oceania Qualify Tournament |
| Brazil (BRA) | 2007 Parapan American Games |
| Canada (CAN) | 2007 Parapan American Games |
| United States (USA) | 2007 Parapan American Games |
| Mexico (MEX) | 2007 Parapan American Games |
| Germany (GER) | IWBF Europe Qualify Tournament |
| Great Britain (GBR) | IWBF Europe Qualify Tournament |
| Netherlands (NED) | IWBF Europe Qualify Tournament |
| China (CHN) | Host nation |

== Competition format ==
Both men's and women's use the same format, team divided into 2 groups, 6 each for men's and 5 each for women's, with a single round robin tournament, then first four of each group compete for 1st-8th place with knock-out format, while last one for women's and last two for men's compete for 9th-10th or 9th-12th place.

== See also ==
- Basketball at the 2008 Summer Olympics
