= Hiroaki Kozai =

Japanese wheelchair basketball player

Hiroaki Kozai is a Japanese wheelchair basketball player who plays for the Japan men's national wheelchair basketball team.

== Biography ==
Hiroaki Kozai was born with deficiencies owing to conditions without having both his lower limbs. He had his first taste of wheelchair basketball at the age of twelve.

== Career ==
He made his Paralympic debut representing Japan at the 2008 Summer Paralympics at the age of 17 and competed in the men's wheelchair basketball tournament where Japan wheelchair basketball side finished at seventh position. He made his second consecutive Paralympics appearance representing Japan at the 2012 Summer Paralympics in the men's wheelchair basketball tournament, where Japan endured a pity underwhelming campaign compared to the previous Paralympic event as they only managed to secure a ninth-place finish.

He was named in the prestigious All Star 5 Team alongside the likes of Abdi Jama (Great Britain), Jake Williams (USA), Tristan Knowles (Australia) and Shaun Norris (Australia) in a Continental Clash tournament as part of Japan's intense training session in a preliminary warmup trials in the lead up to the 2016 Summer Paralympics. Japan wheelchair basketball team went onto secure stunning victories over the Netherlands and 2012 Summer Paralympics gold medalists Canada during the Continental Clash tournament, before agonizingly falling short to Australian counterparts with a margin of 10 points despite Japan having managed to show a glimpse of promise against Australia after displaying a nearly almighty scare in the first half of the match. He took part in his third Paralympic competition during the 2016 Summer Paralympics and yet again Japan wheelchair basketball contingent suffered a disappointing setback with another ninth-place finish in the men's wheelchair basketball tournament.

He also went onto ply his trade in college wheelchair basketball at the University of Illinois and later went onto stamp his authority as a mainstay at the Germany-based club RSV Lahn Dill in the German League. He was part of the Japanese wheelchair basketball side which secured a silver medal at the 2018 Asian Para Games, where Japan pulled off an heist to almost deny eventual winners Iran with the full time score line ending up as 68–66 in favour of Iranian side. He was also a prominent member of the national side which secured a ninth-place finish at the 2018 World Para Wheelchair Basketball Championships in Hamburg, Germany.

He represented Japan at the 2020 Summer Paralympics in his fourth Paralympic appearance and was regarded as the most experienced seasoned campaigner in the Japanese outfit. Above all expectations, Japan went on to secure an historic Paralympic silver medal at the 2020 Summer Paralympics after emerging as runners-up to the US in the final. Japan lost with a score of 64–60. Japan initially had the upper hand in the Paralympic wheelchair basketball final against the United States, but the USA recovered from a five-point deficit in the fourth quarter, trailing with 56–51, to defeat Japan 64–60 at full time.

In 2022, he joined the IWBF Players’ Commission as the male representative of the Asia Oceania Zone. The IWBF Players' Commission was eventually established to give international wheelchair basketball players a groundbreaking platform and a common voice in the governance of global wheelchair basketball.
