= Abdi Jama =

British wheelchair basketball player

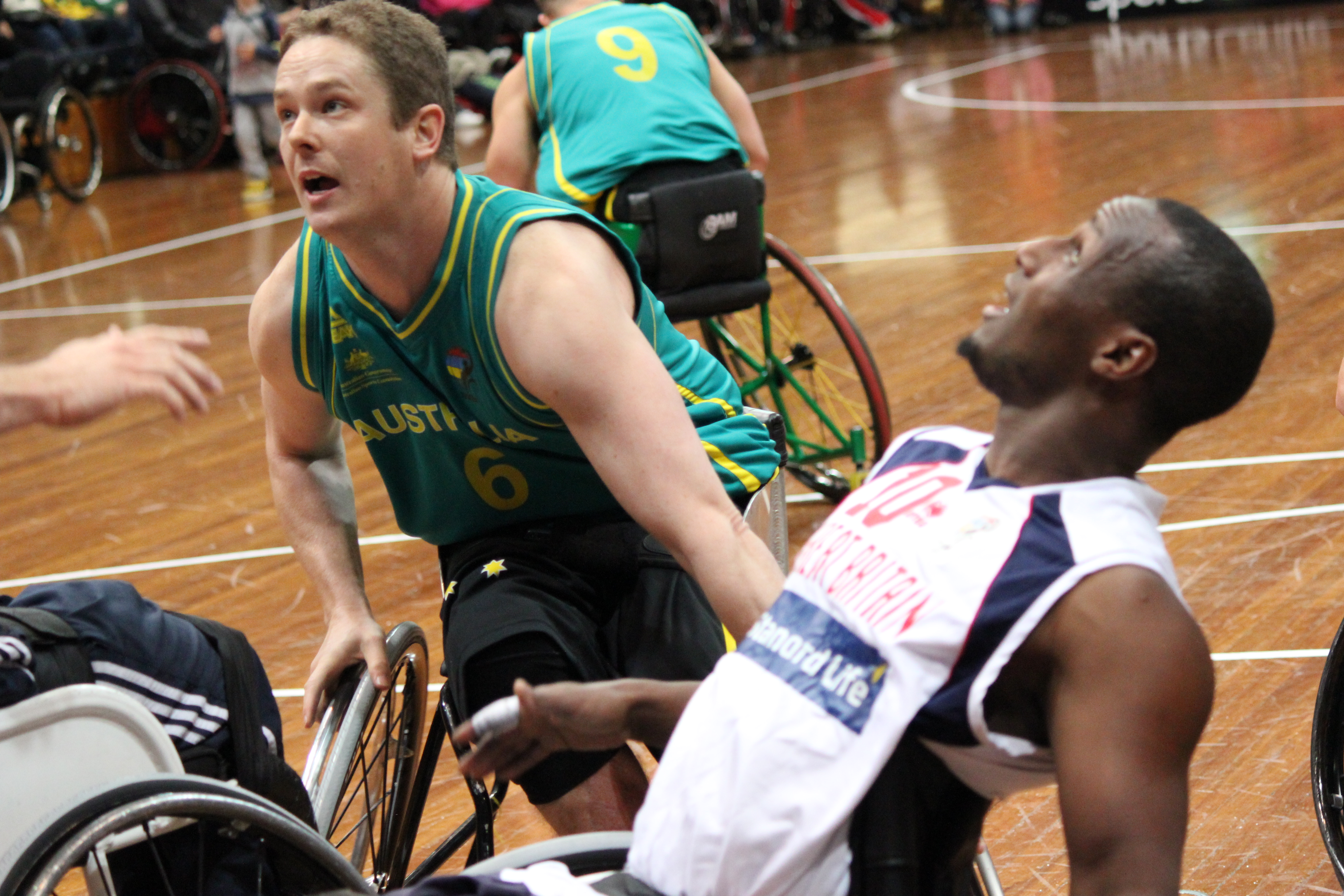
- Jama (right) at Gliders & Rollers World Challenge on 21 July 2012.

Personal information
- Nationality: United Kingdom
- Born: Abdillah Jama; 1 November 1982 (age 43) Burao, Somaliland

Sport
- Country: Great Britain
- Sport: Wheelchair basketball
- Event: Men's team
- Club: Wolves Rhinos
- Team: Bulldogs
Medal record
Men's wheelchair basketball
Representing Great Britain
Paralympic Games
Silver medal – second place	2024 Paris	Team
Bronze medal – third place	2008 Beijing	Team
Bronze medal – third place	2016 Rio	Team
Bronze medal – third place	2020 Tokyo	Team
World Championship
Bronze medal – third place	2026 Ottawa	Team

Abdi Jama (born 1 November 1982) is a Somali British wheelchair basketball player. He was born in Burao, northwestern Somaliland and lives in Liverpool. He was selected to play for Team GB in the 2012 Summer Paralympics in London.

== Personal life ==
Jama was born on 1 November 1982 in Burao, in northwestern Somalia. He lives in Liverpool, England and has 6 brothers and sisters. His family moved from Somalia to Toxteth in Liverpool due to the wars in Somalia. As a child, Jama was left paralysed at the age of 14. He thought that he could not have a sporting career, until he was introduced to wheelchair basketball by Ade Orogbemi. He is a 1 point player

== Wheelchair basketball ==
Jama was introduced to wheelchair basketball by Ade Orogbemi, who was playing for Team GB at the time. Orogbemi went to Jama's school to run a taster session of wheelchair basketball. Jama later became a team-mate of Orogbemi in Team GB. He joined the Liverpool Vikings shortly after. In his career, Jama has represented Great Britain at the 2008 Summer Paralympic Games in Beijing, where his team won bronze. He has played for clubs in Italy and Australia. He currently plays for and trains with the Wolverhampton Rhinos.

In 2007, Jama played in his first championship, the 2007 European Wheelchair Basketball Championships in Wetzlar, where his team won silver. He participated in the 2008 Beijing Summer Paralympic Games for Team GB. The following year he played in the 2009 European Championships in Adana, southern Turkey, where, along with his team, won bronze. In 2010, Jama participated in the 2010 World Wheelchair Basketball Championships in Birmingham for Great Britain. Great Britain came fifth after losing 50–59 to France in the quarter-finals. In the 2011 European Championships in Nazareth, Israel, along with his team, he won gold.
