= Abdi Dini =

Canadian wheelchair basketball player

Medal record

Men's wheelchair basketball

Representing Canada

Paralympic Games
Silver medal – second place	2008 Beijing	Men's team
Gold medal – first place	2012 London	Men's team

Abditatch "Abdi" Fatah Dini (born 1 January 1981) is a professional Canadian wheelchair basketball player. He is currently on the Canadian Team and has won numerous medals in his international career. He has also received the Queen Elizabeth II Diamond Jubilee Medal.

== Personal ==
Dini was born on 1 January 1981 in Somalia and now resides in Scarborough, Toronto, Ontario, Canada. He became paralytic when he was injured by a roadside bomb. He started to play wheelchair basketball in 1996.

== Early career ==
In 1997, Dini had won first place at World Junior Championships in Toronto where he was named the most valuable player (MVP). He also won first place at the CWBL Junior Finals where he was named MVP. He won second place with Team Ontario at the National Championships in the Canada Games in Vancouver, where he was also named an all-star player.

In 1999, Dini won first place in the Canada Games with Team Ontario. Two years later in 2001, he won first with Team Canada in the World Junior Championships in Blumenau, Brazil. Dini had also gotten a third place in the Canada Games with Team Ontario in 2003 and 2007.

== International career ==
Dini won silver in the 2008 Paralympics in Beijing, China with Team Canada. They had also won second place at the North America Cup in Birmingham, USA. In 2009, Dini with Team Canada won second at the Americas Cup in Richmond, BC and was named an All-star. They had also won second place in the Rollers World Challenge in Australia.

In 2010, Dini won seventh place in the World Championships. He had also gotten second at Paralympic Cup in Manchester, UK. He won third place at the Parapan American Games in Guadalajara, Mexico in 2011 and another third place at the International Tournament of Champions in Charlotte, USA. He had also won first place at the Paralympic Cup in Manchester, UK.

In 2012, Dini won first place with Team Canada at the London Paralympic Games in London, England. They had also won first place at the Continental Clash tournament in Worcester, England. One year later, they won sixth place at Americas Cup in Bogota, Colombia, second place at the Kitakyushu Champions Cup in Kitakyushu, Japan and fifth place at the Easter Tournament in Blankenberge, Belgium.

In 2014, Team Canada won fifth place at the Easter Tournament in Blankenberge, Belgium.

== Awards ==
In 2009, Dini was nominated for the "male athlete with a disability of the year award" from the Sport Alliance of Ontario. He also received the Queen Elizabeth II Diamond Jubilee Medal in 2013.
