= Joe Chambers (basketball) =

American wheelchair basketball player (born 1982)

Personal information
- Born: January 10, 1982 (age 44)
Medals
Men's wheelchair basketball
Representing United States
World Championship
Silver medal – second place	2006 Amsterdam	Team
Bronze medal – third place	2010 Birmingham	Team
Paralympic Games
Bronze medal – third place	2012 London	Team

Joseph "Joe" Chambers (born January 10, 1982) is an American wheelchair basketball player.

He was part of the US wheelchair basketball team at the 2008 Summer Paralympics in Beijing, China. USA came in 4th place at the tournament.
