= Matt Byrne =

British wheelchair basketball player

Personal information
- Nationality: Great Britain
- Born: Matthew Byrne; 8 October 1974 (age 51) Nottingham, England

Sport
- Country: Great Britain
- Sport: Wheelchair basketball
- Event: Men's team
- Club: Wolverhampton Rhinos
- Team: Bulldogs
Medal record
Wheelchair basketball
Representing Great Britain
Paralympic Games
Bronze medal – third place	2004 Athens	Men's Wheelchair basketball
Bronze medal – third place	2008 Beijing	Men's Wheelchair basketball

Matthew "Matt" Byrne (born 8 October 1974) is a British wheelchair basketball player. He participated at the 2004 Summer Paralympics in Athens where he finished in third position. At the 2008 Summer Paralympics in Beijing, Byrne finished in bronze medal position with Great Britain. He played for United Kingdom at the 2012 Summer Paralympics in London.

== Personal life ==
Byrne was born in 1974 in Nottingham. He is a paraplegic, meaning that he has an impairment in motor or sensory function of the lower extremities. He was introduced into wheelchair basketball during his rehabilitation at a hospital following a motocross accident at the age of fifteen. He is also married to Anna Byrne who is a teacher at The Long Eaton School.

== Wheelchair basketball ==
Byrne first played wheelchair basketball in 1991, and joined the Sheffield Steelers club for five years before moving to the Nottingham Jaguars, near where he was born. His current club, the Wolverhampton Rhinos (RGK TCAT Rhinos), have won the Super League many times during his time there. He made his début for the Great Britain national team in 2001.

Byrne participated in the 2001/2002 European Championships in Amsterdam, his first time competing at a major international event. He and the United Kingdom national team finished in fourth position, out of medal contention. In 2002, he won a silver medal at the 2002 World Championships in Kitakyushu, a city on the third-largest island of Japan. He finished third and won a bronze medal at the Sassari 2003 European Championships.

Byrne competed in the 2004 Summer Paralympic Games in Athens, Greece; he and the United Kingdom national team won the bronze medal. Following his first Paralympics, Byrne and his team won a silver medal at the 2005 European Championships in Paris and took fifth place at the world championships in Amsterdam the following year. The U.K. team won the silver medal at the European Championships in Wetzlar, Netherlands in 2007.

Byrne and the U.K. team proceeded to win bronze at the 2008 Summer Paralympics in Beijing. The following year, he also won bronze at the European Championships in Adana, Turkey. In 2011, he and his team won gold at the European Championships in Nazareth, northern Israel.

Byrne was a member of the U.K.'s wheelchair basketball national team at the 2012 Summer Paralympics, held in London. The team finished in fourth place after losing to Canada and the United States. In 2012, Byrne was made co-captain of the Great Britain Men's Wheelchair Basketball team.
