= Joey Johnson =

Canadian wheelchair basketball player

Medal record

Men's wheelchair basketball

Representing Canada

Paralympic Games
Gold medal – first place	2000 Sydney	Men's team
Gold medal – first place	2004 Athens	Men's team
Silver medal – second place	2008 Beijing	Men's team
Gold medal – first place	2012 London	Men's team

Joey Johnson (born 26 July 1975) is a professional Canadian wheelchair basketball player. He has competed in several Paralympics and World Championships and was also the first disabled athlete to be inducted in Manitoba's Basketball Hall of Fame.

== Personal ==
Johnson was born on 26 July 1975 in Winnipeg, Manitoba. At age eight, he was diagnosed with Degenerative hip disease. He has a wife, Missy, and 3 children: Owen, Kamryn, and Brody. He also has a brother, Bill Johnson, who was formerly the head coach of the Canadian Sr. Women's Wheelchair Basketball Team. He attended the University of Wisconsin–Whitewater when he achieved a place on the Canadian National Team.

== Career ==
In 1996, Johnson got fifth place in the Atlanta Summer Paralympics with Team Canada. In 1998, they got third place at the Sydney World Championships. They also got second place at the Parapan American Games in Mexico City.

In 2000, they won gold at the Sydney Paralympics. In 2003, they also won gold in the Parapan American Games in Mar del Plata, Argentina. He had also won first place in National Wheelchair Basketball League with the Wollongong Roller Hawks. In 2004, Johnson won gold at the Athens Paralympics with Team Canada. He was later awarded the Paralympic Sport Award for best team performance in 2005.

Johnson won gold in the 2006 World Championships in Amsterdam, Netherlands with Team Canada and was named an "All-star". In 2007, they came second at the Parapan American Games in Rio de Janeiro, Brazil.

They won silver in the 2008 Beijing Paralympics. They won seventh in the World Championships at Birmingham, UK in 2010. In 2011, they got third in the Parapan American Games in Guadalajara, Mexico and first place at the 2012 London Paralympic Games with Team Canada.

After the 2012 Paralympics, Johnson retired.

== Awards ==
In 2013, Johnson was inducted into Manitoba Basketball Hall of Fame becoming the first Paralympic athlete to be inducted.
