= Shaun Norris =

Australian wheelchair basketball player (born 1985)

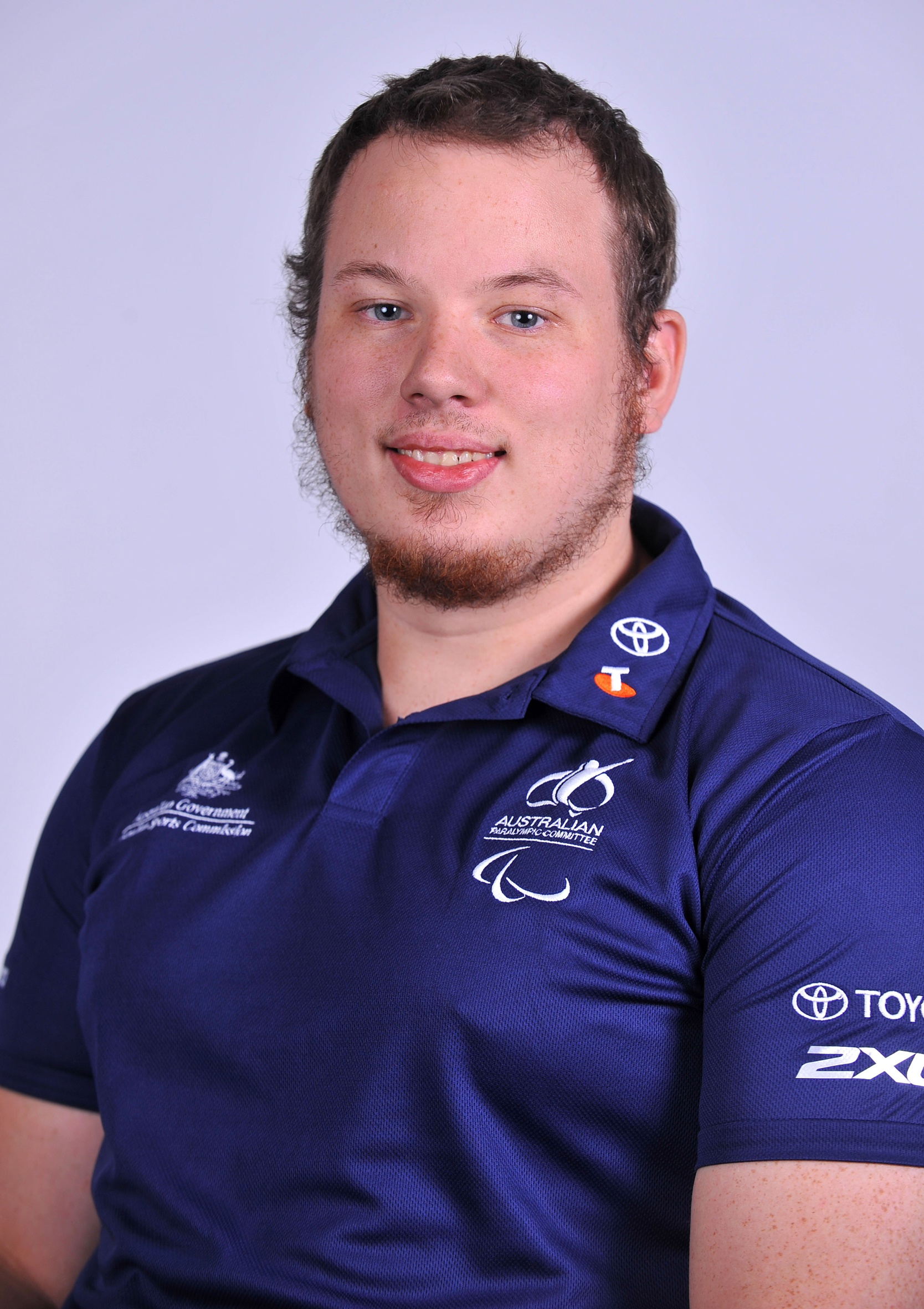
- 2012 Australian Paralympic team portrait of Norris

Personal information
- Full name: Shaun Daryl Norris
- Nationality: Australia
- Born: 2 April 1985 (age 41)

Sport
- Disability class: 3.0
- Club: Be Active Perth Wheelcats
Medal record
Wheelchair basketball
Paralympic Games
Gold medal – first place	2008 Beijing	Team
Silver medal – second place	2004 Athens	Team
Silver medal – second place	2012 London	Team
World Championship
Gold medal – first place	2010 Birmingham	Team
Gold medal – first place	2014 Incheon	Team
Bronze medal – third place	2006 Amsterdam	Team
Bronze medal – third place	2018 Hamburg	Team

Shaun Daryl Norris, OAM (born 2 April 1985) is an Australian wheelchair basketball player. He was a member of the Rollers at the 2024 Paris Paralympics, his sixth Games.

== Early life ==
Norris is from the Perth suburb of Banksia Grove, Western Australia, and was born on 2 April 1985. He became a paraplegic after a car accident.

== Basketball career ==
Norris's wheelchair basketball classification is 3.0, and he is a shooting guard. His ability to play wheelchair basketball has been supported by the Western Australian Institute of Sport Individual Athlete Support Program.

=== National team ===
When competing for the national team, Norris wears number 7.

==== Paralympics ====
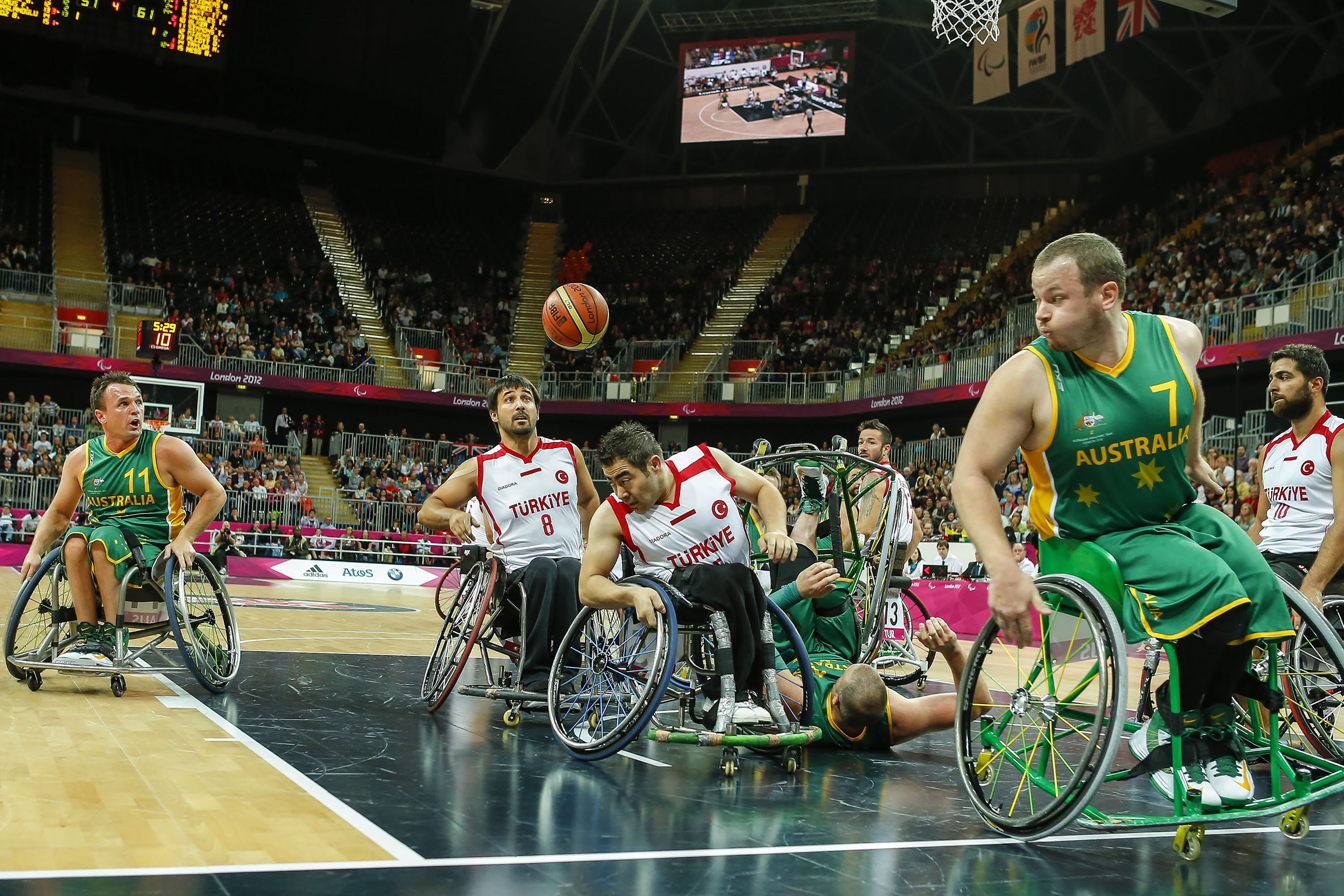
Norris at the 2012 London Paralympics

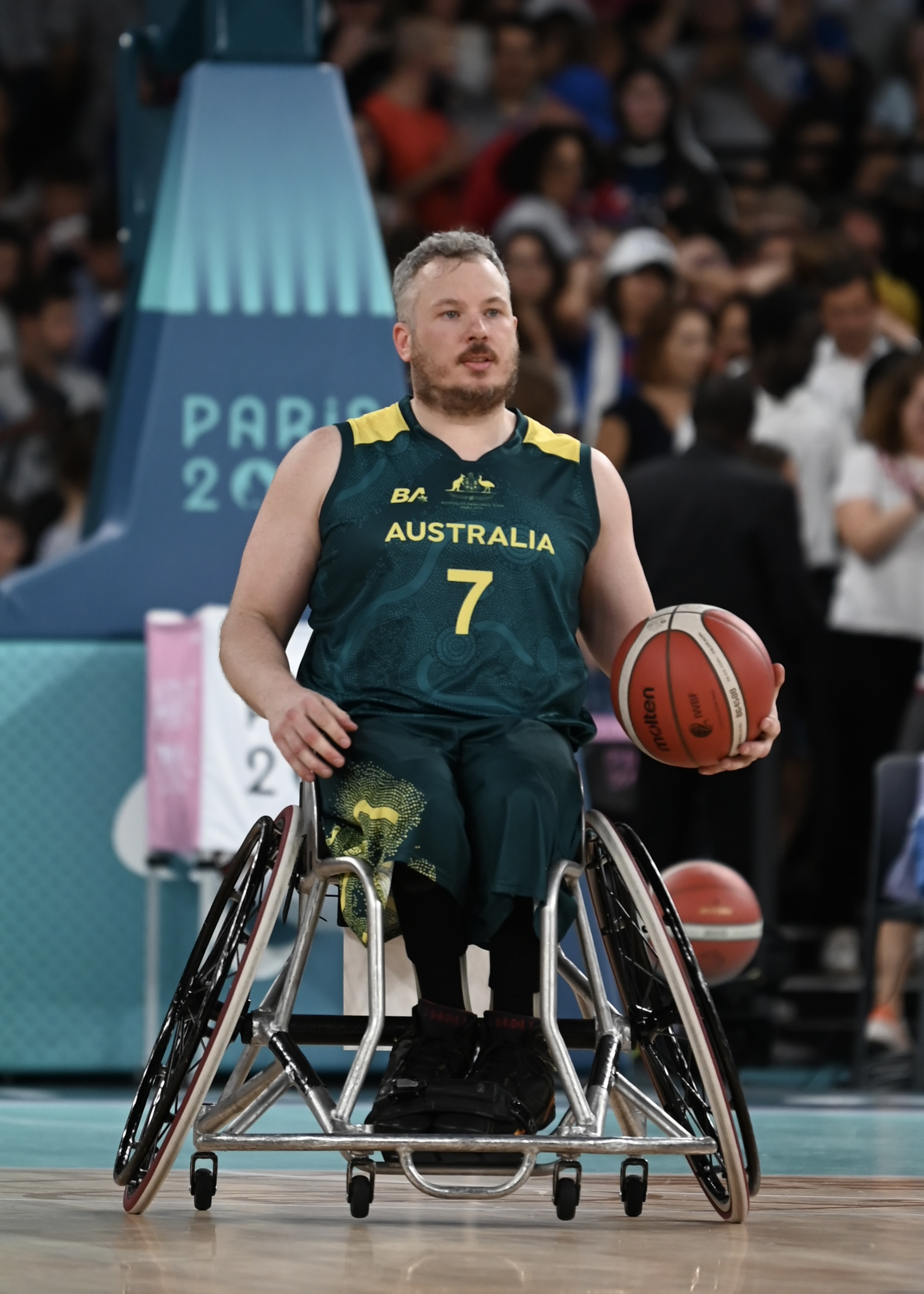
Norris at the 2024 Paris Paralympics

Norris was part of the silver medal-winning Australia men's national wheelchair basketball team at the 2004 Summer Paralympics. He was also part of the gold medal-winning Australia men's national wheelchair basketball team at the 2008 Summer Paralympics, for which he received a Medal of the Order of Australia. At the 2012 Summer Paralympics he was part of the Australian men's wheelchair team that won silver.

Norris was chosen to be a part of the team sent to represent Australia at the 2016 Paralympics where they finished sixth.

At the 2020 Tokyo Paralympics, the Rollers finished fifth with a win–loss record of 4–4. At the 2024 Paris Paralympics, he was a member of the Rollers that finished fifth with a win/loss record of 3-3.

==== Other competitions ====
In 2003, he competed at the Kitakyushu Champions Cup in Japan, where his team took first place. In 2004, he was part of the squad that came in first place at the Roosevelt Cup. In 2006, he was named as part of the World All-Star 5 for the 2006 Gold Cup tournament. He was part of the 2007 squad that competed at the Paralympic World Cup. In 2008, he was part of the team that took silver at the Beijing Paralympic test event. In 2009, he was part of the Australian squad that won a gold medal at the IWBF Asia-Oceania Championship. In the final game of the tournament, in a game versus Japan, he had 7 rebounds, 19 points and 2 assists. That year, he also won a gold medal as part of the team that competed at the Paralympic World Cup in Manchester, England. In 2009, he was part of the national side that competed at the Rollers World Challenge. He was a member of the Australia men's national wheelchair basketball team that competed at the 2010 Wheelchair Basketball World Championship that won a gold medal. He and fellow Australian teammate Justin Eveson were recognised for their performance at the tournament by being named as one of the World All-Star Five for the tournament. He was a member of the Rollers team that won the gold medal at the 2014 Wheelchair Basketball World Championships. In 2016, he was selected for the 2016 Summer Paralympics in Rio de Janeiro.

In 2018, he was a member of the Rollers that won the bronze medal at 2018 Wheelchair Basketball World Championship in Hamburg, Germany.

=== Club basketball ===
Norris plays his club basketball for the Perth Wheelcats. In 2002, he played club basketball for the Perth Wheelcats of Australia's National Wheelchair Basketball League. That year, the team won the league championship, and he was named the Most Valuable Player for the Finals series. In 2007, he was still part of the Wheelcats team, and the again won the league championships. That year, he was named the league's MVP and was named as part of the league's All-Star Five. That same year, the Wheelcats won the World Club Championships. In 2009, he was again on the roster for the Perth Wheelcats. His performances helped the team win some games, including a round two victory of the Adelaide Thunder. In 2010, he was playing club basketball with CD Fundosa Grupo. As of 2011, he plays his club basketball for the Perth Wheelcats. In the first game of the 2011 season against the Wollongong Roller Hawks, he had 16 assists. His Perth Wheelcats lost to the Wollongong Roller Hawks in the 2011 NWBL Championship. He scored 23 points in the semi-final, and 28 points in the preliminary finals. In the finals, he had 15 points, 9 assists and 9 rebounds.

== Recognition ==
In 2010, he was named one of The West Australian ANZ Sports Star Nominees in the wheelchair basketball category. In 2014, he was awarded Wheelchair Sports WA Sports Star of the Year and Be Active Perth Wheelcats MVP. Norris was named International Paralympic Committee Athlete for the Month - November 2019.
