= Terry Bywater =

British wheelchair basketball player

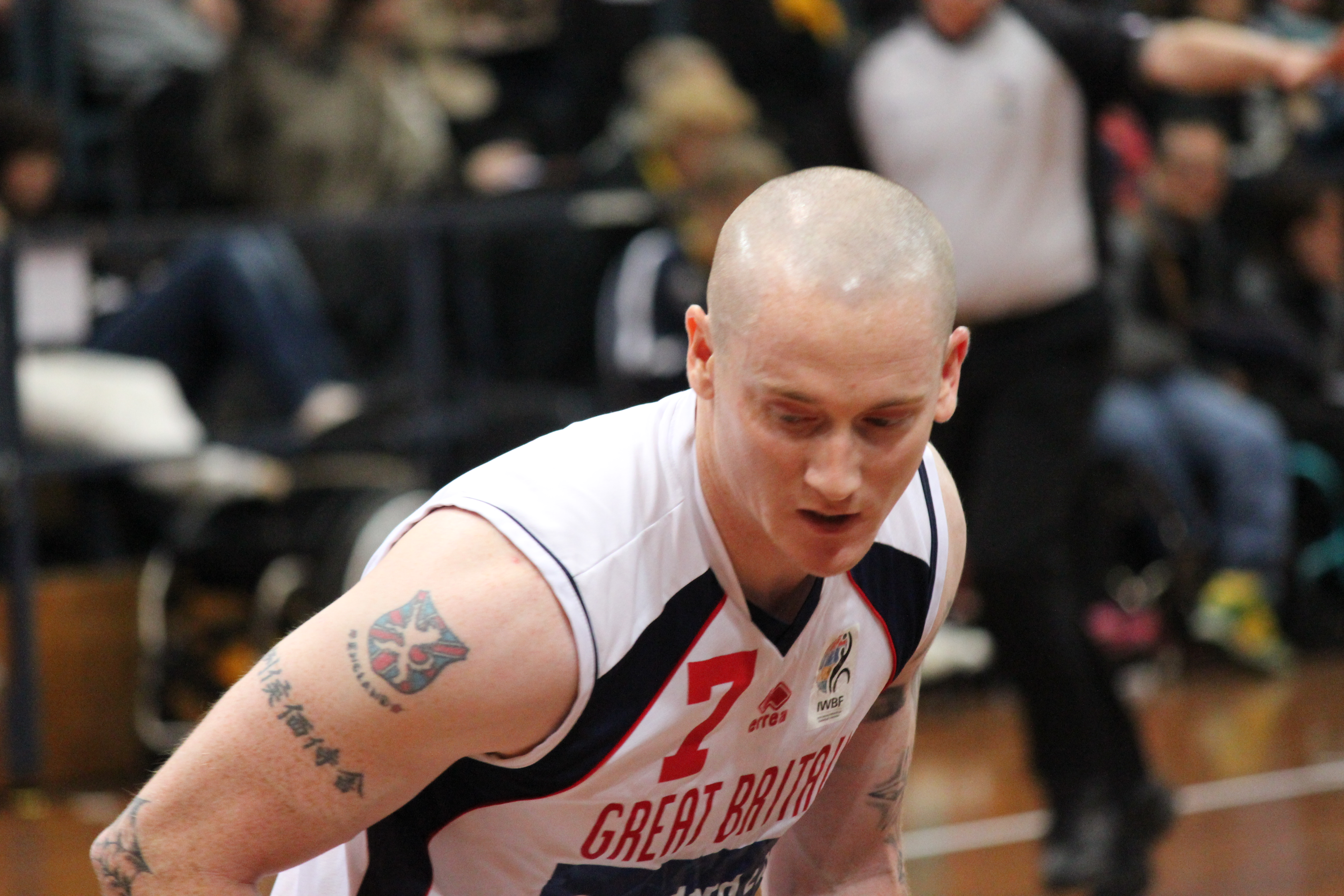
- Terry Bywater at Gliders & Rollers World Challenge on 21 July 2012

Personal information
- Born: 28 February 1983 (age 43)
- Home town: Cleveland, North Yorkshire
- Height: 1.80 m (5 ft 11 in) (2009)
- Weight: 74 kg (11 st 9 lb) (2009)

Sport
- Country: Great Britain
- Sport: Wheelchair basketball
- Disability class: 4.5
- Club: Sheffield Steelers
- Team: Bulldogs
Medal record
Men's wheelchair basketball
Representing Great Britain
Paralympic Games
| Silver medal – second place | 2024 Paris | Team |
| Bronze medal – third place | 2004 Athens | Team |
| Bronze medal – third place | 2008 Beijing | Team |
| Bronze medal – third place | 2016 Rio | Team |
| Bronze medal – third place | 2020 Tokyo | Team |
World Championship
| Bronze medal – third place | 2026 Ottawa | Team |

Terry Bywater (born 28 February 1983) is a British wheelchair basketball player. He participated in the 2000 Summer Paralympics, where his team came in fourth place; in the 2004 Summer Paralympics, where he won a bronze medal and was the highest scorer for Great Britain; the 2008 Summer Paralympics, winning another bronze medal; and the 2012 Summer Paralympics, where his team again came in fourth place.

== Personal life ==
Bywater was born on 28 February 1983. As of 2012, he lives in Cleveland, North Yorkshire. As of 2009, he weighs 74 kilograms (11 st 9 lb) and is 1.8 metres (5 ft 11 in) tall. He was born without a tibia and a fibula in his left leg, which was amputated when he was two.

== Wheelchair basketball ==
Bywater began playing wheelchair basketball at the age of 13 at an open day in Middlesbrough with the Teesside Lions. He later played with them. After playing for a year, he was selected for the Great Britain Under-23 team and began training. He made his debut at the Sydney 2000 Summer Paralympics, and finished fourth. He participated in the 2008 Summer Paralympics in Beijing, where he won a bronze medal, and was the top Great Britain scorer in the event. He currently plays for the Sheffield Steelers. He once played for C. D. Fundosa in Spain, along with many other European clubs. Bywater returned to England so he could play with the Super League Club Sheffield Steelers throughout the 2011–12 season. He is a 4.5 point player.

His first championships were the 2001/2002 European Championships in Amsterdam, Netherlands, where he finished fourth. In 2002 he went to the World Championships in Kitakyushu in Japan, where he finished second (silver). He participated in the 2003 European Championships in Sassari, Italy, and won bronze. He competed in the 2005 European Championships in Paris, France, and won silver. He competed in the 2006 World Championships in Amsterdam and was fifth place, and in 2007 he participated in the European Championships in Wetzlar, Netherlands, and received a silver medal. Two years later, he won bronze in the European Championships of Adana in Turkey. In 2010, for the first time, he participated in the World Wheelchair Basketball Championships in Birmingham, and was fifth place. He won gold in the 2011 European Championships in Nazareth, Israel. At the 2012 Summer Olympics in London, the wheelchair basketball team lost to the United States, and finished in fourth position, after losing to Canada, missing out of the finals. He said that not winning a medal at the Paralympics was the "worst moment" of his career.
