= Brad Ness =

Australian wheelchair basketball player (born 1974)

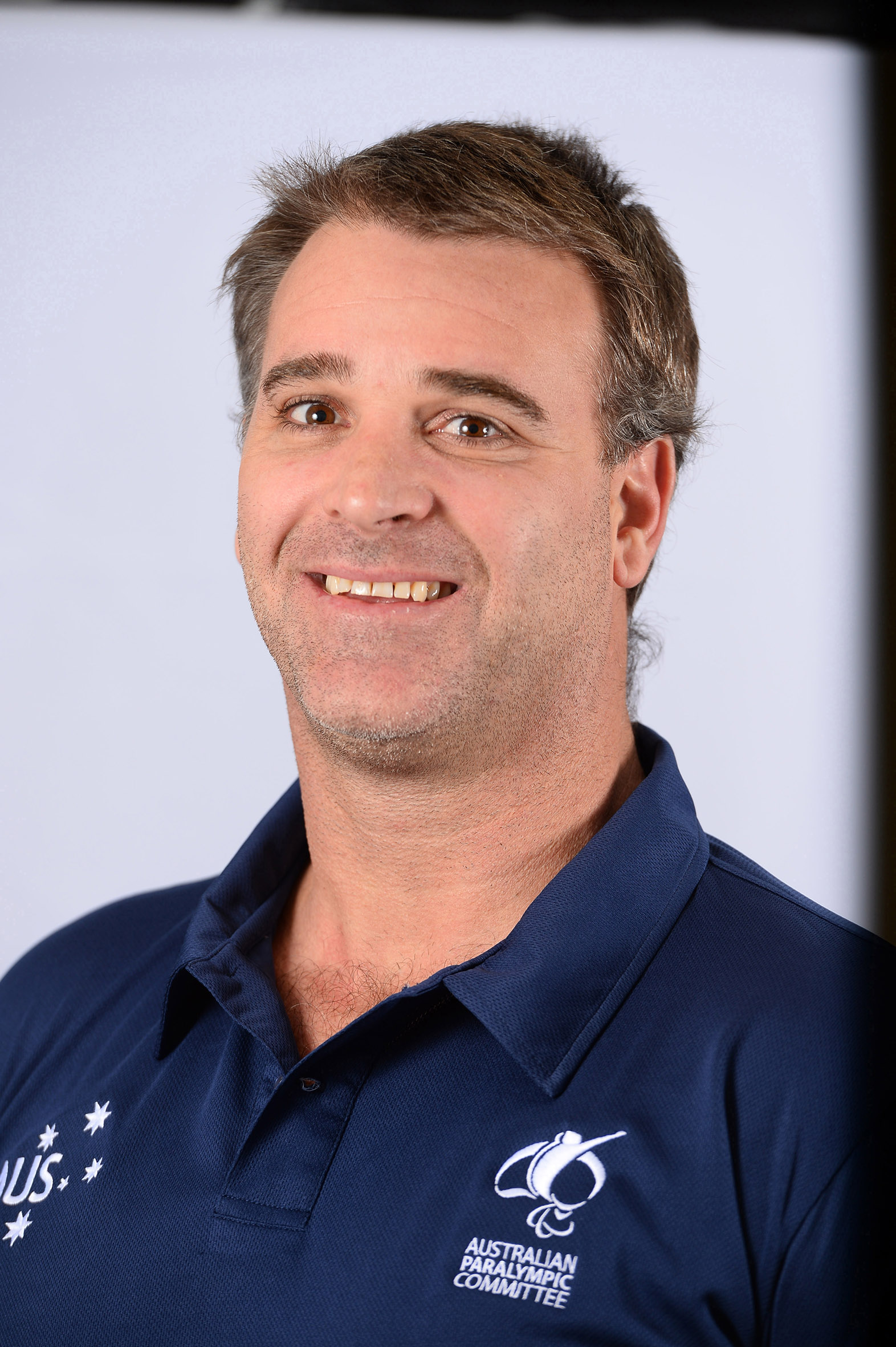
- 2016 Australian Paralympic team portrait

Personal information
- Full name: Bradley John Ness
- Nationality: Australia
- Born: 24 November 1974 (age 51) Perth, Western Australia
- Education: Aquinas College, Perth

Sport
- College team: University of Texas at Arlington
Medal record
Wheelchair basketball
Paralympic Games
Silver medal – second place	2004 Athens	Men's wheelchair basketball
Gold medal – first place	2008 Beijing	Men's wheelchair basketball
Silver medal – second place	2012 London	Men's wheelchair basketball
World Championship
Bronze medal – third place	2006 Amsterdam	Team
Gold medal – first place	2010 Birmingham	Team
Gold medal – first place	2014 Incheon	Team

Bradley John Ness, OAM (born 24 November 1974) is an Australian wheelchair basketballer. He won a gold medal at the 2008 Beijing and silver medals at 2004 Athens and 2012 London Paralympics. He was selected as the Australian flag bearer at the Opening Ceremony at the 2016 Rio Paralympics. In December 2023, Ness was appointed the Head Coach of the Rollers - Australia men's national wheelchair basketball team.

== Personal ==
We were preparing to leave the pier when the skipper thought he heard me calling "all clear", but the rope I was attending was still attached to the quayside. When the ferry moved out, the rope tightened and sliced off my right ankle as neatly as a chef chopping through a carrot.

— Brad Ness

Brad Ness was born on 24 November 1974, and is from the Western Australian country town of Wagin. On 19 December 1992, at the age of 18, he lost his leg in a boating accident aboard a high-speed ferry between Rottnest Island and Fremantle. The accident happened while the workers were preparing to leave the pier. Ness's leg was attached to the quayside when the ferry was moving out, the rope tightened and sliced off his right ankle. He was working on the ferry as a deckhand at the time. He was back to working on boats again within six months of his accident, and received his licensed mariner's licence. As a youth he competed in several sports including Australian rules football, tennis and swimming, and was good enough at football that he considered a professional career in the sport. Ness decided to try basketball after seeing a wheelchair basketball game on television.

He is married and lives in Fremantle.

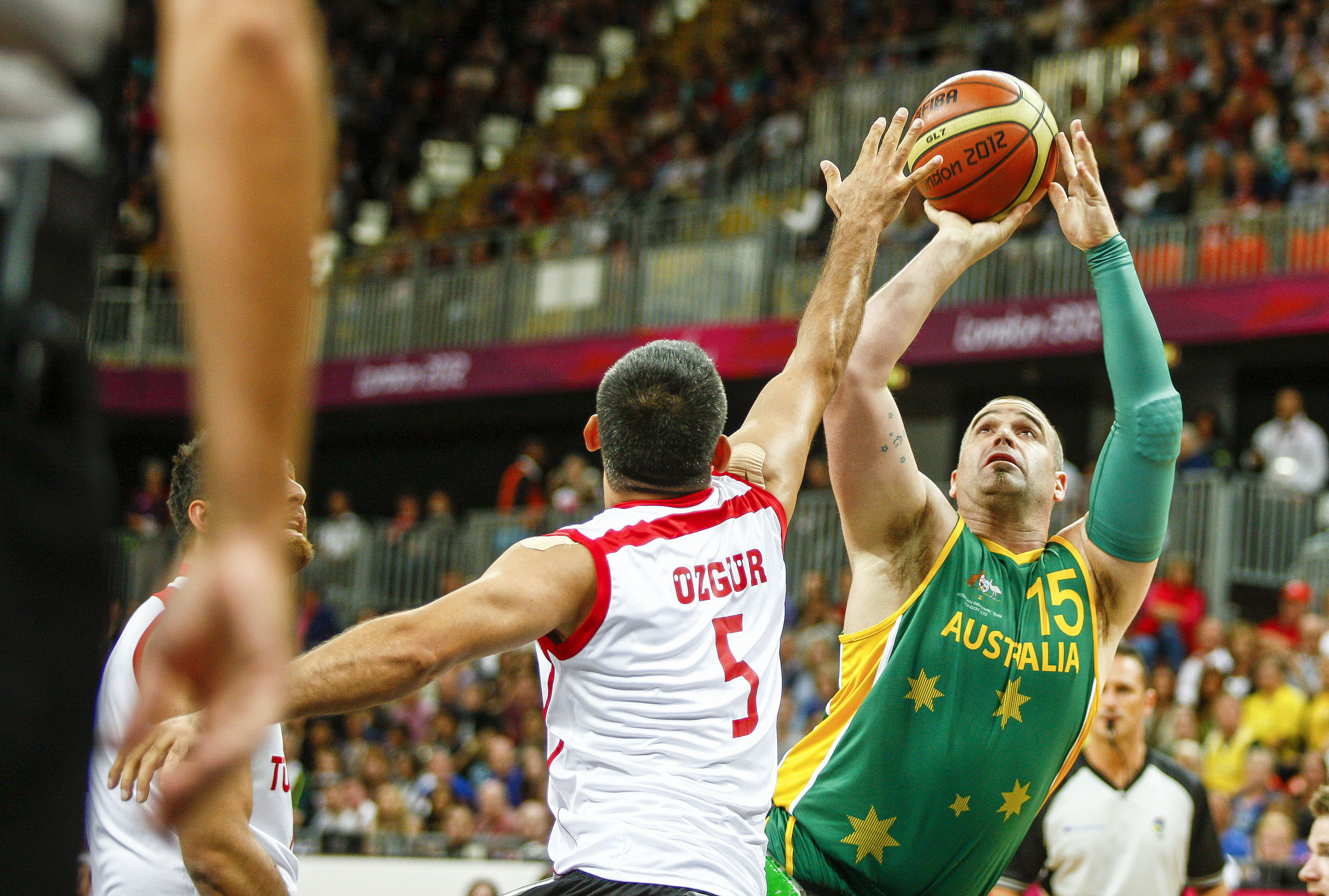
Ness at the 2012 London Paralympics

In February 2013, thieves broke into his house and stole his Paralympic medals by blasting his safe out of its wall. During a ceremony at the Perth parliament house on 9 July 2013, he was given replacement medals by the Australian Paralympic Committee, a first for the organisation.

== Basketball ==
Ness is classified as a 4.5 player and plays centre. He first started playing wheelchair basketball in 1996 after having seen the game played on television. His ability to play wheelchair basketball has been supported by the Western Australian Institute of Sport Individual Athlete Support Program, and he currently plays basketball full-time as a professional.

=== National team ===
Ness first made the national team in 1999 at the Roosevelt Cup in Georgia, USA.

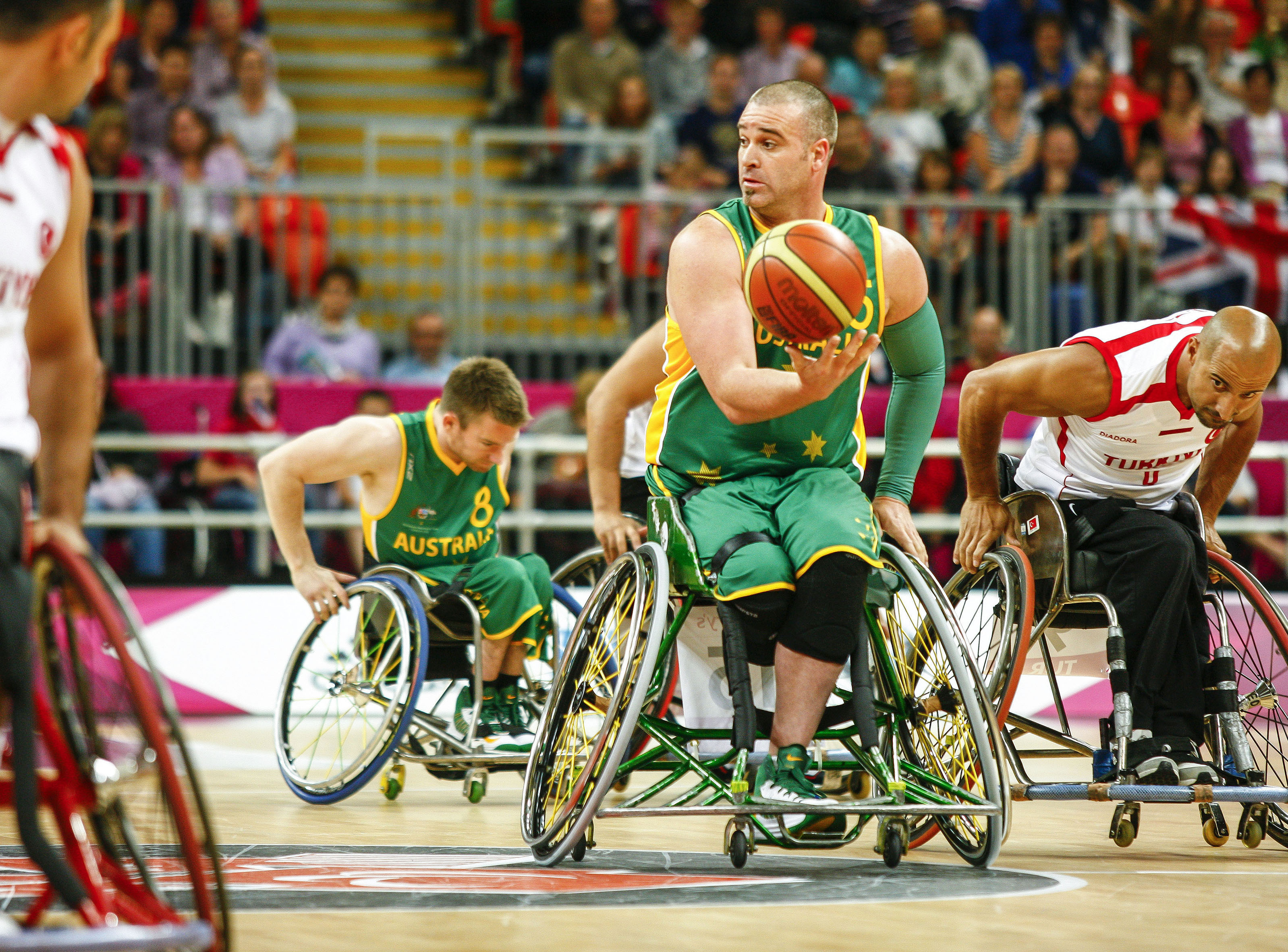
Ness at the 2012 London Paralympics

==== Paralympics ====
As a member of the Australia men's national wheelchair basketball team, Ness competed at the 2000 Sydney, 2004 Athens, 2008 Beijing, and 2012 London Paralympic Games, winning a gold medal in 2008 and silver medals in 2004 and 2012. He captained the team at the 2008 and 2012 Paralympics. In 2016, he was selected for his fifth games, the 2016 Summer Paralympics in Rio de Janeiro where his team, The Rollers, finished sixth.

==== Other national team competitions ====
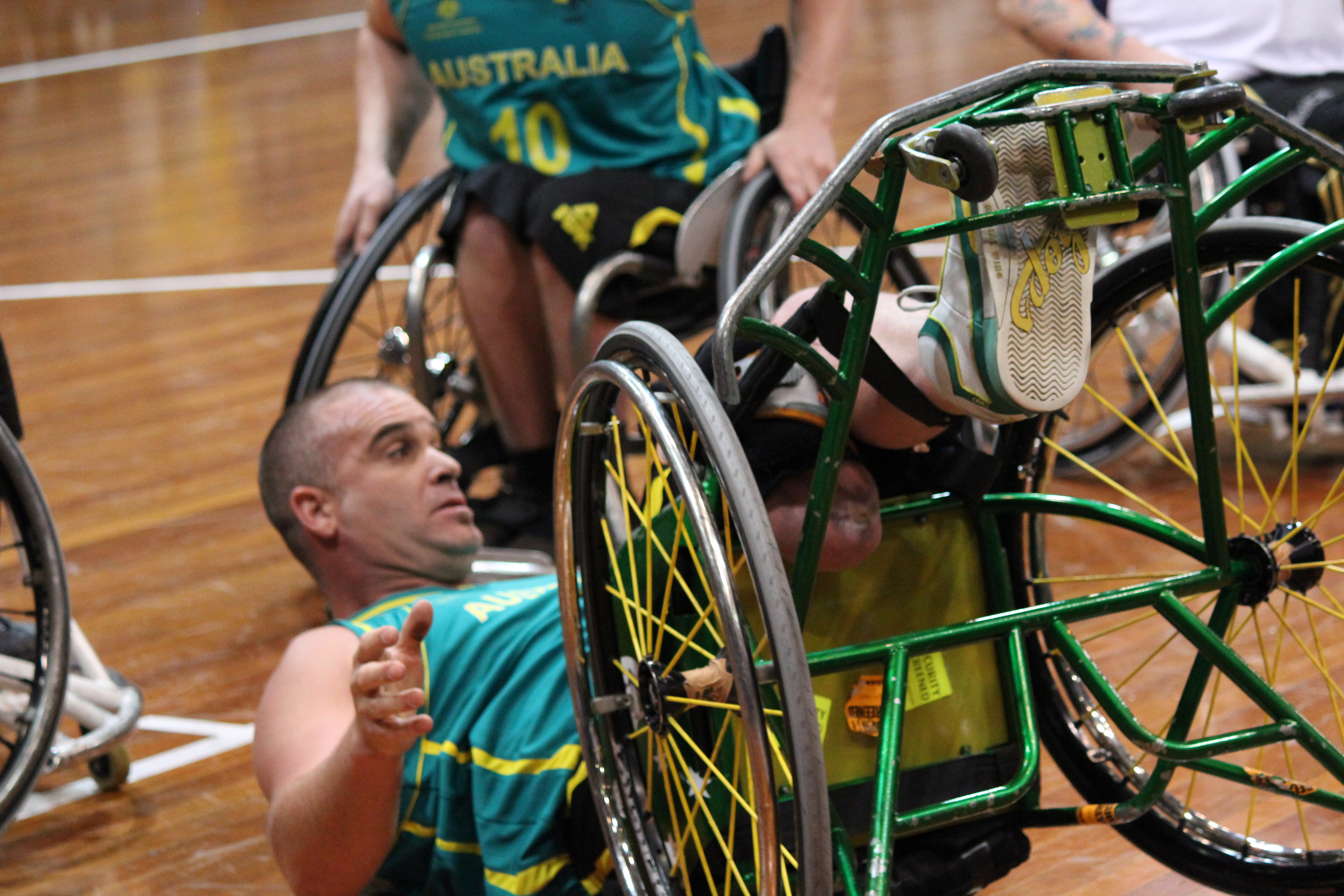
Brad Ness (on floor) and Jannik Blair (No.10) of Australia. Great Britain vs Australia men's national wheelchair basketball team at Gliders & Rollers World Challenge on 21 July 2012.

In 2001, Ness competed at the AOZ World Cup, where his team came in first, and he was named as part of the All-Star Five. He was part of Australia's 2003 Kitakyushu Champions Cup championship team, as well as the 2004 Asia Oceania Cup champion team. In 2004, he was a member of the national team that came in first place at the Roosevelt Cup. He was also part of the AOZ Paralympic qualifying tournament team that finished first. He was named a member of the AOZ All-Star Five at the tournament. In 2005, he was part of the squad that competed at the Paralympic World Cup that won a silver medal. In 2006, he was named the captain of the Australian team, and was part of the Paralympic World Cup team that won a silver medal. That year, he was also part of the squad that won a bronze medal at the World Championships. In 2008, he was part of the team that took gold at the Beijing Paralympics. He was on the team that competed in the Rollers World Challenge held in August 2009, where he scored 17 points in the match against Japan. He was part of the team that competed at IBWF AOZ Oceania Championship 2009 and won gold. At the Oceania championships, he scored 9 points and had 10 rebounds in the final match against Japan. He was past of the Australian team at the 2010 IWBF World Championships held in Birmingham, England, that won a gold medal, the team that competed at the Wheelchair Tri Series 2011, and the gold medal-winning Australia men's national wheelchair basketball team that competed at the 2010 Wheelchair Basketball World Championship. Ness was a member of the Rollers team that won the gold medal at the 2014 Wheelchair Basketball World Championship.

=== Club basketball ===
In 2000, Ness played for the Dandenong Rangers, and helped the team win the National Wheelchair Basketball League (NWBL) Championships. In 2001, he was named as part of the NWBL's All-Star Five. In 2002, he played for the Perth Wheelcats and helped that team win the NWBL Championships. In 2006, he was named the NWBL Most Valuable Player. That year, he was also playing club basketball in Italy. He was part of the 2007 Perth Wheelcats that won the NWBL Championship and the World Club Championship.As of 2011, he plays his club basketball in Italy for a Series A team, and the Perth Wheelcats. His Perth Wheelcats lost to the Wollongong Roller Hawks in the 2011 NWBL Championship.

=== University basketball ===
He played university basketball at the University of Texas at Arlington, where he competed as a scholarship holder.

=== Outreach ===
He is involved with helping young disabled children play basketball, and helped set up two teams for them in Cantu and Rome.

=== Coaching ===
In February 2017, Ness was appointed assistant coach for the Rollers. In December 2023, Ness was appointed the Head Coach of the Rollers - Australia men's national wheelchair basketball team and will coach the team of the 2024 Paris Paralympics.

== Recognition ==
Ness won the Western Australian Wheelchair Sports Star-of-the-year award with Justin Eveson in 2003. In 2007, he was awarded the Sandy Blythe Medal for International Wheelchair Basketball Player of the Year. In 2009, he received the Medal of the Order of Australia "For service to sport as a gold medallist at the Beijing 2008 Paralympic Games". In 2015, he was awarded the Western Australian Institute of Sport Personal Excellence Award. He was selected as the Australian flag bearer at the Rio Paralympics Opening Ceremony.

In August 2021, Ness was inducted into the Basketball WA Hall of Fame.

In 2022, Ness was awarded Western Australian Institute of Sport Coach of the Year.
