= Richard Peter (Paralympian) =

Canadian wheelchair basketball and para badminton player

Personal information
- Born: December 14, 1972 (age 53) Duncan, British Columbia, Canada
- Listed height: 5 ft 8 in (1.73 m)

Career information
- Playing career: 1994–2012
Medals
Men's wheelchair basketball
Representing Canada
Paralympic Games
Gold medal – first place	2000 Sydney	Men's team
Gold medal – first place	2004 Athens	Men's team
Silver medal – second place	2008 Beijing	Men's team
Gold medal – first place	2012 London	Men's team

Richard "Bear" Peter (born September 10, 1972) is a Canadian First Nations wheelchair basketball and para-badminton player. Peter was born in Duncan, British Columbia, and currently resides in Vancouver. When Richard was four years old, he was injured in a bus accident, leaving him in a wheelchair ever since. He began playing wheelchair basketball at the age of 15 when he was inspired by a team that came to his school and introduced him to wheelchair sports. Since then, Peter has competed in the 1996, 2000, 2004, 2008 and 2012 Paralympic Games, winning the gold medal for wheelchair basketball for three of those years.

== Personal life ==
Richard Peter grew up in British Columbia's largest First Nations community, the Cowichan Tribes reserve and he became a paraplegic when he was run over by a bus at the age of four. His parents are Leonard and Gloria Peter. Both his parents and his tribe encouraged him to play sports, and the tribe contributed when financial aid was needed. He began playing wheelchair basketball at 15 and was on the Canadian national team in 1994 when he was 22 years old. Peter married fellow wheelchair basketball player and Vancouver native, Marni Abbott (now Marni Abbott-Peter) in 2005; the two initially met through wheelchair basketball in 1994. She retired from competitive basketball in 2004, and has worked at GF Strong Rehabilitation as a sports consultant and coach since. Her initial drive for participating in competitive wheelchair sports came from Rick Hansen, who she met at GF Strong Rehabilitation. She believes that he and Terry Fox “paved the way [for us]” and there is more accessibility and awareness in Canada because of their actions. Both she and Rick Hansen entered the B.C Sports Hall of Fame in 2007. Richard and Marni do public events together, like presentations and hosting of events. Examples of this include a presentation at the end of the kickoff for Rick Hansen's third “Man in Motion” tour and an annual Kelowna basketball jamboree. The jamboree is a friendly competition meant to bring the community together.

During Peter's time in Beijing on the Canadian Paralympic Team in 2008, he was the only First Nations athlete on the team.

== Tribal contributions ==
Peter is part of the Cowichan tribe in Duncan and has sat on committees to contribute his knowledge in making decisions. One such decision was to host the B.C. Summer games in 2018. At this event, Peter lit the opening ceremony torch and participated in the event as a role model and motivational speaker. The event itself was infused with Indigenous elements like the blessing and blanketing ceremony in the beginning, having many signs posted in the most common First Nations language in that area, and having a partnership with the Indigenous Sport, Physical Activity and Recreation Council to create more opportunities for Indigenous athletes to participate in Indigenous sports.

As well as assisting Peter financially, the tribe itself invests money into other youth sports, allowing for more participation. It is estimated the tribe invests about $35.2 million into their local community. Some of the services include employment offices, cultural outreach, community justice programs and schools.

== Basketball career ==
For most of his 18-year career, Peter was a senior member of Canada's National Wheelchair Basketball team. In 1996, Peter's second year with the team, Canada came in fifth in the Atlanta Paralympics. Peter helped lead Canada to gold in three Paralympic Games, the first being Sydney in 2000, then Athens in 2004 and finally, London in 2012. Peter fell short of a gold in 2008 in Beijing when the Canadian national team was defeated by Australia. He and the team won the world championship title in 2006 and he was a member of British Columbia's provincial team, which has won five consecutive national championships. He spent the last two years of his career playing semi-pro wheelchair basketball in Germany and Italy. Peter had also won a national title in the United States.

Peter retired in 2012 at the age of 40, after an 18-year career spent representing his country in international and Paralympic competitions; he was inducted into the BC Sports Hall of Fame in 2010. In 2000 and 2004, Peter was awarded the national Tom Longboat Award, established in 1951 to recognize Aboriginal athletes for their outstanding contributions to sport in Canada. Peter was awarded the Indspire Award in the Sport category in 2012. During Peter's career, he was known for his determination, commitment and focus. Both on and off the court, he was a role model to both young and old people and was a positive contributing member to the team.

== Career ==
Peter began as a program coordinator at the B.C. Wheelchair Sports Association while he was still competing professionally in basketball. Here, he began as a camp counselor and moved up to his current position. He organizes many of the junior sport camps, where he motivates children in wheelchairs to pursue healthy lifestyles and sport participation. One of the youth campers can recall that “when he plays with us, it makes me want to do the best I can”. He ensures that every child participates and he brings in his gold medals to show his accomplishments due to his hard work. Along with being a role model for basketball, he also began competitive wheelchair tennis and continues to participate in sport.

Alongside the camps, he has hosted an “Aboriginal Have a Go!” day, where those considered Indigenous could try different wheelchair sports like tennis, basketball and rugby. The day was not exclusive to those in wheelchairs. The event was in association with “Bridging the Gap”, which is an organization where they raise awareness for wheelchair sports, with one of the methods being the holding of “Have a go!” days.

Peter sees a need in his community for Indigenous sport run programs.

== Community involvement ==
While still involved in professional wheelchair basketball, Peter began mentoring youth, and specifically those who were paralyzed. In 2012, while training in Europe for the Paralympics, he flew back to visit with and introduce a recently paralyzed First Nations teen to wheelchair sports. During his playing a wish of his was to continue mentoring youth and he has been able to mentor youth through many inspirational and motivational speeches for children. This includes a speech for a training camp geared towards Aboriginal youth and at a “mini we day” at a public school, which included a “we stand together” campaign to raise awareness about Aboriginal youth in their schools.

Along with the Canadian Paralympic Committee, he also participated in a cross country tour called “Canadian Paralympic Schools Week” where they educated Canadians about Paralympic sports in Canadian towns and cities. While in Iqaluit, Peter was able to make a difference, making connections with youth who had disabilities and getting to know members in the community on a personal level.

== Paralympic Achievements ==
In 1994, after Peter made the Senior Men's National Team, on Team Canada, he became an important player for their team. From his first game to his last game he made his nation proud with winning a great deal of medals, and he even won them back-to-back.

Results	Games
Medals
Gold	2012 London Paralympics
Silver	2008 Beijing Paralympics
Gold	2004 Athens Paralympics
Gold	2000 Sydney Paralympics
Fifth Place	1996 Atlanta Paralympics

== Awards ==
Tom Longboat Award national male winner in 2004 and 2000

Gert Vorsteher Memorial Award

British Columbia Wheelchair Basketball Society (BCWBS) Male Athlete of the Year 2012

Indspire Award - Sport Category - 2012

Canadian Wheelchair Basketball Athlete of the Year 2008

Queen Elizabeth II Diamond Jubilee Award

City of Duncan Sports Trophy winner 2004

Some of his medals are in an Indigenous Sport Gallery, located in the BC Sports Hall of Fame. Along with his display, there are many displays which showcase the complex history of Aboriginal participation in various sporting events.

Canadian Disability Hall of Fame induction in 2019.
