= Simon Munn =

British wheelchair basketball player (born 1968)

Personal information
- Nationality: British
- Born: 31 January 1968 (age 58) Aylesbury, Buckinghamshire

Sport
- Country: Great Britain
- Sport: Wheelchair basketball
- Event: Men's team
- Club: Capital City Aces
- Team: Bulldogs
Medal record
Men's wheelchair basketball
Representing Great Britain
Paralympic Games
Silver medal – second place	1996 Atlanta	Team competition
Bronze medal – third place	2004 Athens	Team competition
Bronze medal – third place	2008 Beijing	Team competition
Bronze medal – third place	2016 Rio	Team competition

Simon Munn (born 31 January 1968) is a British wheelchair basketball player. He is originally from Aylesbury.

He had his left leg amputated after a railway accident.

As a wheelchair basketball player, Munn has played for clubs including Super League Club MK Aces, Tameside Owls and London Club Capital City. He is classified as a 4 point player. He received the British Wheelchair Sport Awards in 2007.

Munn was part of Great Britain's wheelchair basketball team at the 1992, 1996, 2000, 2004, 2008, 2012, and 2016 Summer Paralympics. The team took the silver medal in 1996, and the bronze in 2004 and 2008. He planned to retire as a basketball player after the 2012 Summer Paralympics in London, but eventually competed in his seventh Paralympics in Rio de Janeiro in 2016.
