= Justin Eveson =

Australian Paralympic athlete (born 1980)

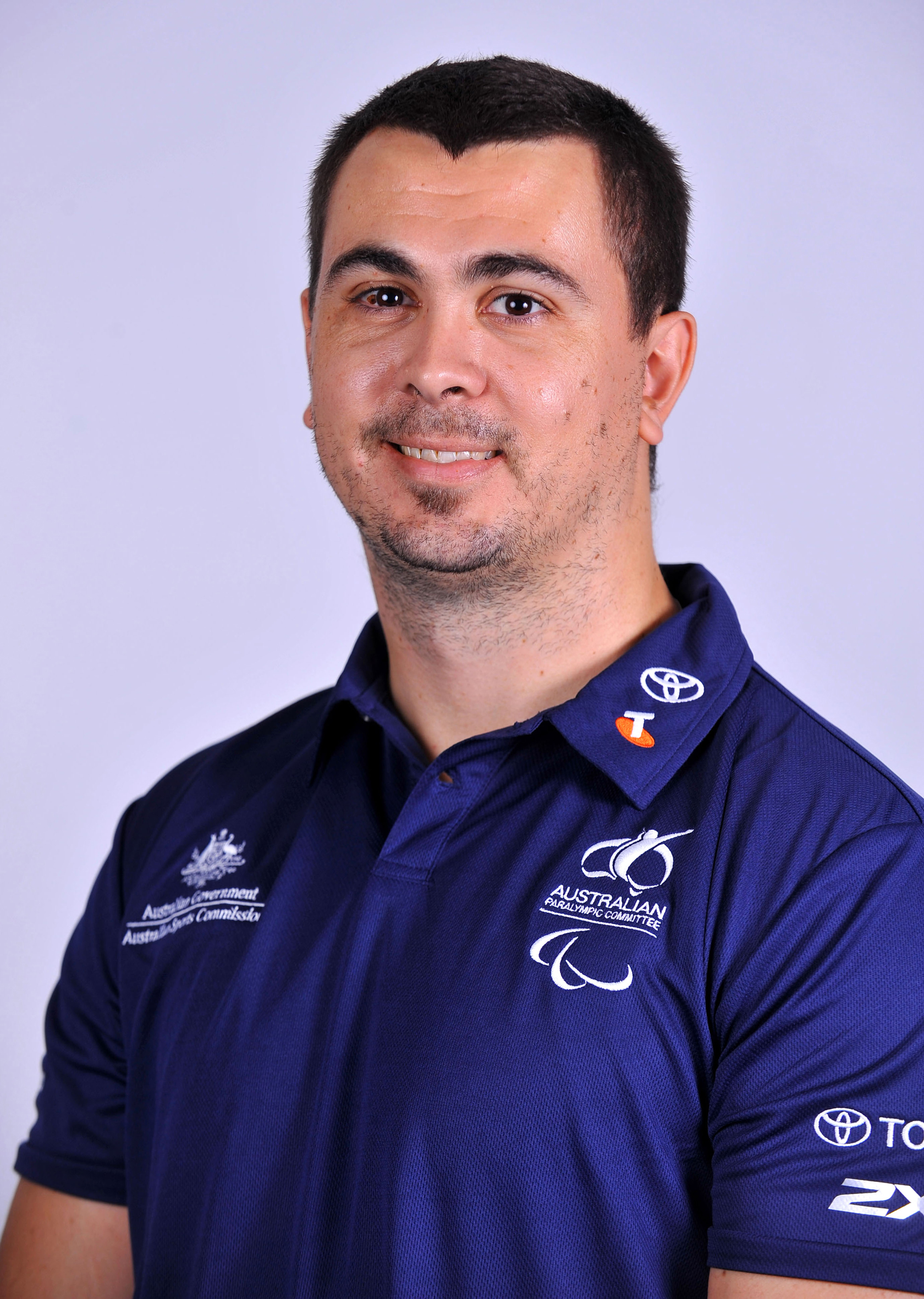
- 2012 Australian Paralympic team portrait of Eveson

Personal information
- Full name: Justin Cain Eveson
- Nationality: Australia
- Born: 10 June 1980 (age 46)
Medal record
Swimming
Paralympic Games
Silver medal – second place	2000 Sydney	4x100m freestyle relay 34 pts
Bronze medal – third place	2000 Sydney	4x100m medley relay 34 pts
Wheelchair basketball
Paralympic Games
Gold medal – first place	2008 Beijing	Men's wheelchair basketball
Silver medal – second place	2004 Athens	Men's wheelchair basketball
Silver medal – second place	2012 London	Men's wheelchair basketball
World Championship
Gold medal – first place	2010 Birmingham	Team
Gold medal – first place	2014 Incheon	Team
Bronze medal – third place	2006 Amsterdam	Team

Justin Cain Eveson, OAM (born 10 June 1980) is an Australian swimmer and wheelchair basketball player who has won Paralympic medals in both sports.

== Personal ==
Eveson was born on 10 June 1980, and is from the Perth suburb of Victoria Park. In 1993, when he was 12 years old, his right leg was amputated below the knee after a lawn aerating machine accident. Prior to his accident, he had played basketball. In 2010, he was the patron for the Australian University Games. He works as a fitness instructor, and his personal hero is his father. He also serves as the Membership and Participation Officer for Wheelchair Sports Western Australia. Outside of competitive basketball and swimming, he plays golf.

== Swimming ==
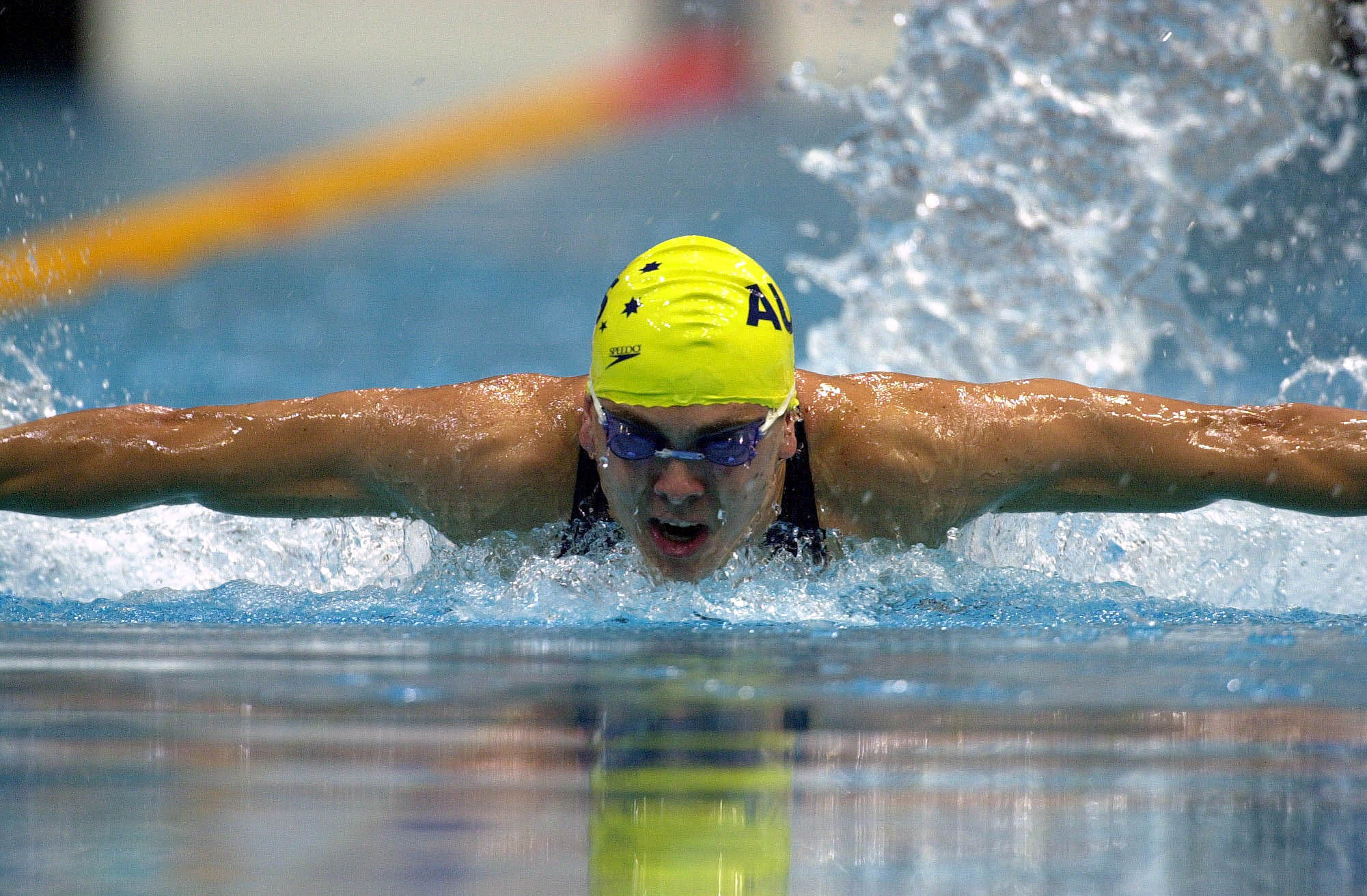
Action shot of Eveson during the 200 m medley SM10 at the 2000 Summer Paralympics

Eveson first started competing in disabled sport in 1995, doing swimming and wheelchair basketball. Around that time, he decided to focus on swimming. From 1996 to 1999, he was part of the Wheelchair Sports WA Association Junior Sports Star program as a swimmer. He competed in the 2000 Summer Paralympics, where he won a 4 × 100 m freestyle relay silver and 4 × 100 m medley relay bronze medal.

== Basketball ==
Eveson's player classification is 4.5 and he plays power forward. Eveson first started playing wheelchair basketball in 1995. His ability to play has been supported by the Western Australian Institute of Sport Individual Athlete Support Program. In 2009, the basketball teams that Eveson played for won every tournament he was part of at a club and national team level.

In August 2022, Eveson was inducted into the Basketball WA Hall of Fame.

=== National team ===
In 2002, Eveson made his first appearance on the Australia men's national wheelchair basketball team.

==== Paralympics ====
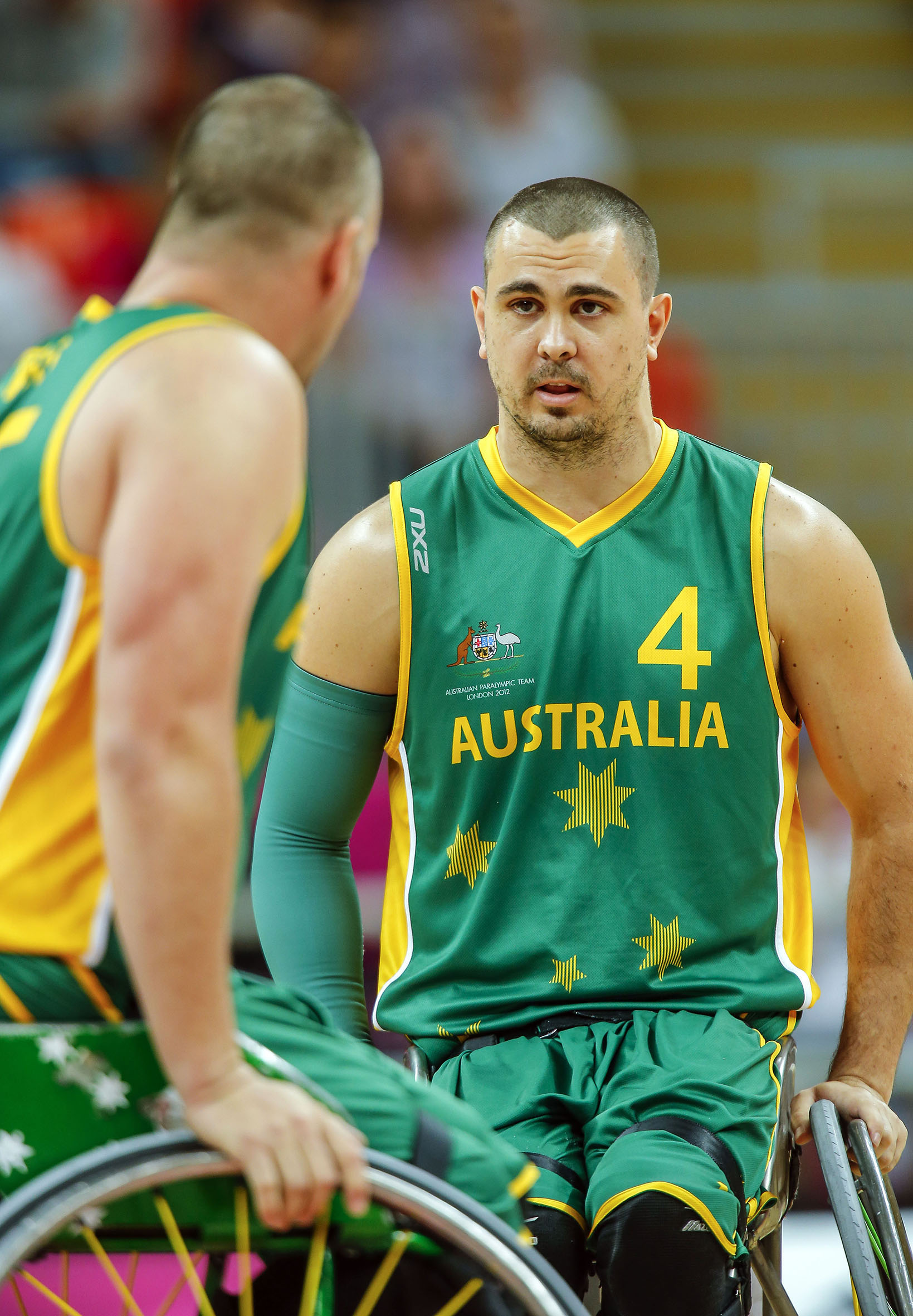
Eveson at the 2012 London Paralympics

I feel that to win Paralympic gold is one of the great measures of success and considering the amount of effort put in, it feels incredible to have been part of that achievement.

— Justin Eveson

Eveson was part of the silver medal-winning Australia men's national wheelchair basketball team at the 2004 Summer Paralympics, and the gold medal-winning Australia men's national wheelchair basketball team at the 2008 Summer Paralympics, for which he received a Medal of the Order of Australia. He was the team's leading scorer.

At the 2012 Summer Paralympics he was part of the Australian men's wheelchair team that won silver.

==== Other competitions ====
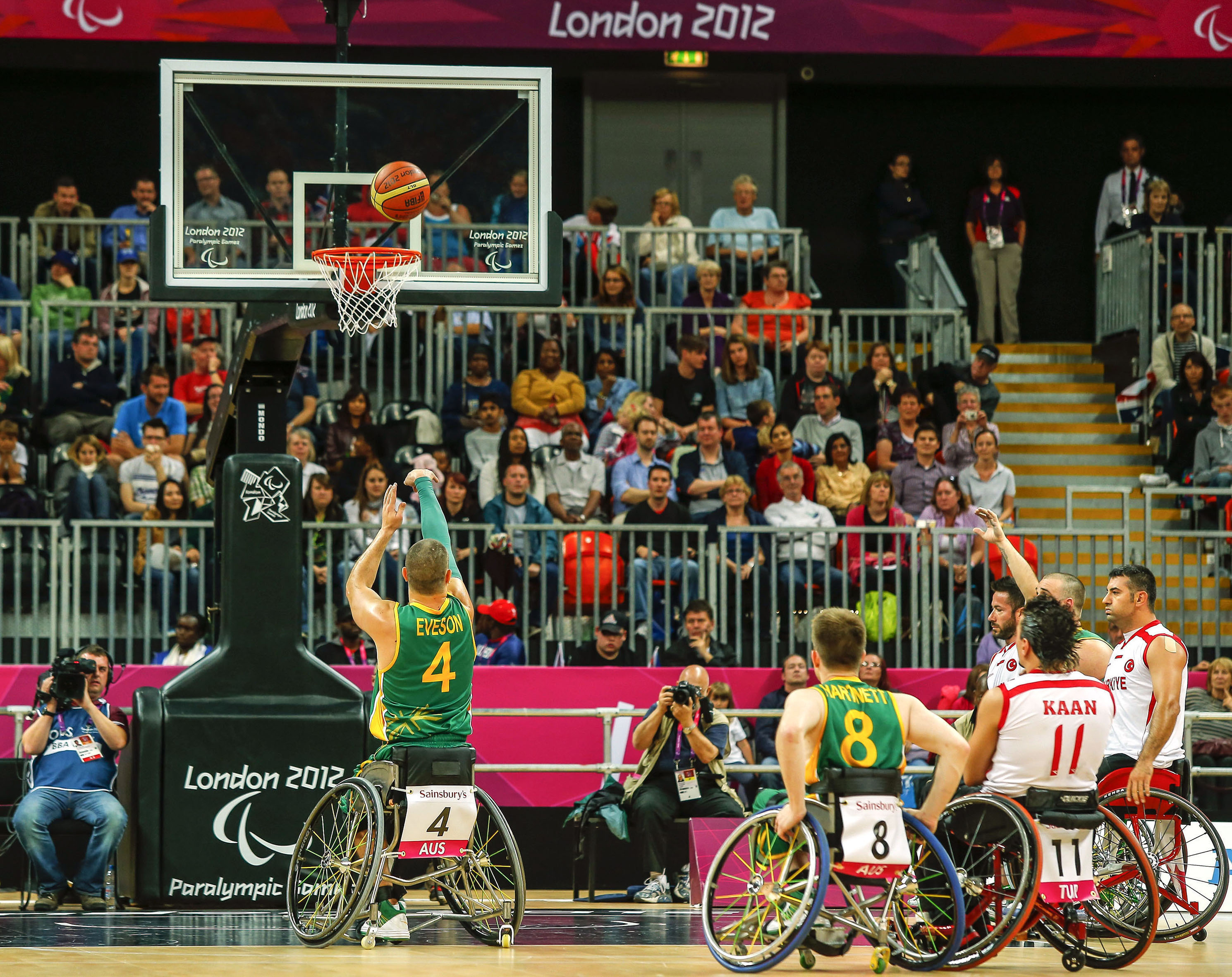
Eveson at the 2012 London Paralympics

In 2006, Eveson was part of the squad that won a bronze medal at the World Championships. In 2008, he was part of the team that took silver at the Beijing Paralympic test event. That year, he was the captain of the gold winning Australian side at the Paralympic World Cup held in Manchester, England. In 2009, he was part of the Australian gold winning IWBF Asia-Oceania Championship side and the 2009 Rollers World Challenge team that won gold. At the tournament, he scored 25 points, had 5 assists and 13 rebounds. He was a member of the Australia men's national wheelchair basketball team that competed at the 2010 Wheelchair Basketball World Championship that won a gold medal. He and fellow Australian teammate Shaun Norris were recognised for their performance at the tournament by being named as one of the World All-Star Five for the tournament. He was a member of the Rollers team that won the gold medal at the 2014 Wheelchair Basketball World Championships.

=== Club basketball ===
Eveson has played professional wheelchair basketball in Australia, Italy, Spain and Turkey. In 2001, Eveson made his club basketball debut with the National Wheelchair Basketball League (NWBL)'s Perth Wheelcats. He has won three European Champions League Cups in a row. In 2007, he was playing club basketball in Australia for the Perth Wheelcats. His team won the league's Championship that year, and Evenson was named the MVP for Championship game. That year, the Wheelcats were also the World Club Champions. In 2008, he was playing club basketball in Turkey for Galatasaray. That year, his team won the European Champions Cup. He was named Most Valuable Player of the Championship match and was named as part of the All-Star Five for the tournament. In 2010, he played for the Perth Wheelcats when it won the league's Championships. In 2011, he was playing for the Perth Wheelcats. In the first game of the season against the Wollongong Roller Hawks, he scored 35 points.

== Recognition ==
Eveson won the Western Australian Wheelchair Sports Star-of-the-year award with Brad Ness in 2003. In 2008, he received the Sandy Blythe Medal given for the International Wheelchair Player of the Year. In 2009, Laureus World Athlete of the Year Awards named him as one of their finalists. In 2010, he was named one of The West Australian ANZ Sports Star Nominees in the wheelchair basketball category.
