= Patrick Anderson (wheelchair basketball) =

Canadian wheelchair basketball player

Personal information
- Born: August 22, 1979 (age 46); Edmonton, Alberta, Canada
- Listed height: 6 ft 4 in (193 cm)

Career history
- 1990–2003: Twin City Spinners
- 2003: Brisbane Spinning Bullets
- 2002; 2003–2006: RSV Lahn-Dill
- 2006–2007: Prince George Titans
- 2007–2008: British Colombia Cable Cars
- 2007–2010: Douglas College
- 2010–2011: Cologne 99ers
- 2013–present: New York Rollin Knicks
Medals
Men's wheelchair basketball
Representing Canada
Paralympic Games
Gold medal – first place	2000 Sydney	Men's team
Gold medal – first place	2004 Athens	Men's team
Gold medal – first place	2012 London	Men's team
Silver medal – second place	2008 Beijing	Men's team

Patrick Anderson (born August 22, 1979) is a Canadian wheelchair basketball player and a six-time member of Canada's Paralympic Team.

== Personal life ==
Anderson was born in Edmonton, Alberta, Canada, and he grew up in Fergus, Ontario. At the age of nine he was hit by a drunk driver, and as a result lost both his legs below the knee. Because of this, he is classified as a 4.5-point player for competition.

== Basketball ==
Anderson is widely considered to be one of the best wheelchair basketball players in the world. He began playing the sport in 1990 and was first chosen for the Canadian national team in 1997.

He led the Canadian Junior Men's National Team to victories in the World Championships in 1997 and 2001, and was named MVP at both competitions. At senior level he was a member of the team that won a bronze medal at the 1998 World Championships and was chosen as a member of the all-star team for the event.

In 2000 he represented Canada at the Paralympics for the first time at the Sydney Games. The Canadian team won the gold medal in the men's tournament. He won his second Paralympic gold medal at the 2004 Summer Paralympics in Athens, Greece, where the Canadian team defeated Australia in the final.

At the 2008 Summer Paralympics in Beijing, China, Anderson was a member of the Canadian team who won the silver medal after losing to the team from Australia in the final. After the 2008 Games, he retired from basketball and moved to New York to attend university in order to fulfill his dream of becoming a professional musician.

Having come out of retirement in 2011, Anderson was selected to compete for Canada at the 2012 Summer Paralympics in London, United Kingdom. Canada advanced through the group stages of the tournament, beat Spain in the quarterfinals and defeated hosts Great Britain in the semifinals to reach the gold medal match against Australia. In the final Anderson scored 34 points, had 10 rebounds and 8 assists as Canada won the gold medal with a 64–58 victory.

Anderson was selected to be Canada's flagbearer for the opening ceremony Parade of Nations at the 2024 Summer Paralympics in Paris, along with swimmer Katarina Roxon. Canada lost to Germany in the bronze medal match, finishing in fourth place. This was his sixth and final Games, dating back to Sydney 2000.
