= Jon Pollock =

British wheelchair basketball player (born 1977)

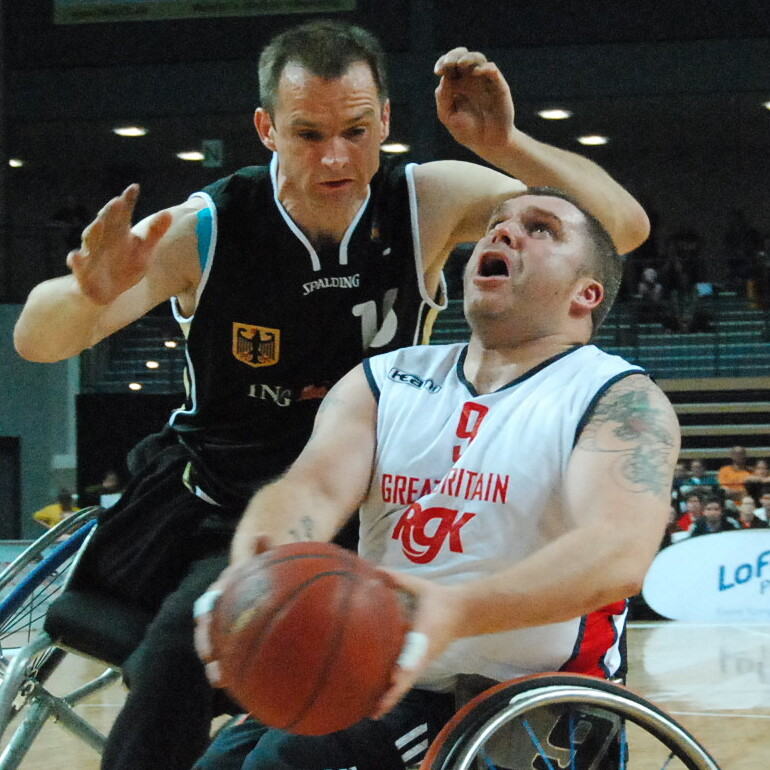
- Pollock (right) in 2007

Personal information
- Nickname: Joni
- Born: Jonathan Pollock; 11 May 1977 (age 49) Liverpool, England

Sport
- Country: Great Britain
- Sport: Wheelchair basketball
- Event: Men's team
- Club: Widnes Raiders, UK; Oldham Owls, UK; Greenbank Academy, UK; C.D Fundosa Once, Spain; Wolves Rhinos, UK; RGK Panthers, UK; Sheffield Steelers, UK; Sydney WheelKings, Australia; Tabu Cantu, Italy; Once Sevilla, Spain
- Team: Bulldogs
Medal record
Wheelchair basketball
Representing United Kingdom
Paralympic Games
Bronze medal – third place	2004 Athens	Team
Bronze medal – third place	2008 Beijing	Team

Jon Pollock (born 11 May 1977) is a British wheelchair basketball player. He was selected to train with the British wheelchair basketball squad in 1993. Pollock has played at four Paralympic games: the 2000 Summer Paralympics in Sydney, the 2004 Summer Paralympics in Athens, the 2008 Summer Paralympics in Beijing, and the 2012 Summer Paralympics in London. He won a bronze medal at the 2004 and the 2008 Paralympics.

== Personal life ==
Pollock was born on 11 May 1977 in Liverpool, England, with spina bifida, a developmental congenital disorder. He currently lives in Wigan, Greater Manchester, in north west England.

== Wheelchair basketball ==
Pollock was a class 2.5 wheelchair basketball player and point/shooting guard. He has been competing in wheelchair basketball for twenty years. In his twenty-year career, he has represented Team GB and Paralympics GB four times at various Summer Paralympic Games.

Pollock first competed at the 1997 European Wheelchair Basketball Championship in Madrid, Spain, winning silver. Two years later, he played in the 1999 European Championships in Roermond, Netherlands. He ended in fourth place with his team. In 2000, he was a member of Team GB in the 2000 Summer Paralympic Games, held in Sydney, Australia. Along with his team, they finished in fourth place; out of the medals. In 2001–02, he finished in fourth place at the 2001/2002 European championships in Amsterdam, Netherlands. In the 2002 World Championships, he won silver after losing to USA in the final and was first selection in the World All Star 5, in Kitakyushu, Japan. He participated in the 2003 European Championships, in Sassari, Italy. He won bronze in this event. In the 2004 Summer Paralympics in Athens, Greece, he was in medal position. He finished, along with his team, in the bronze medal position. Two years after the Paralympics, he was at the 2006 World Championships in Amsterdam. He finished in fifth position. The following year, Pollock was at the 2007 European Championships, in Wetzlar, Netherlands. Along with his team, he finished in silver medal position. The following year, he was a member of the squad in the 2008 Summer Paralympic Games in Beijing. Here, he won his second Paralympic bronze. In 2009 he won bronze in the European championships in Adana, southern Turkey. In 2010, he finished fifth, along with his team, in the World Wheelchair Basketball Championships, held in Birmingham. At the 2012 Summer Paralympics in London, Pollock and the GB team got through to the semi-finals after beating Turkey, but lost against Canada 52–69, keeping them out of medal position.
