= Ade Orogbemi =

British-Nigerian wheelchair basketball player (born 1978)

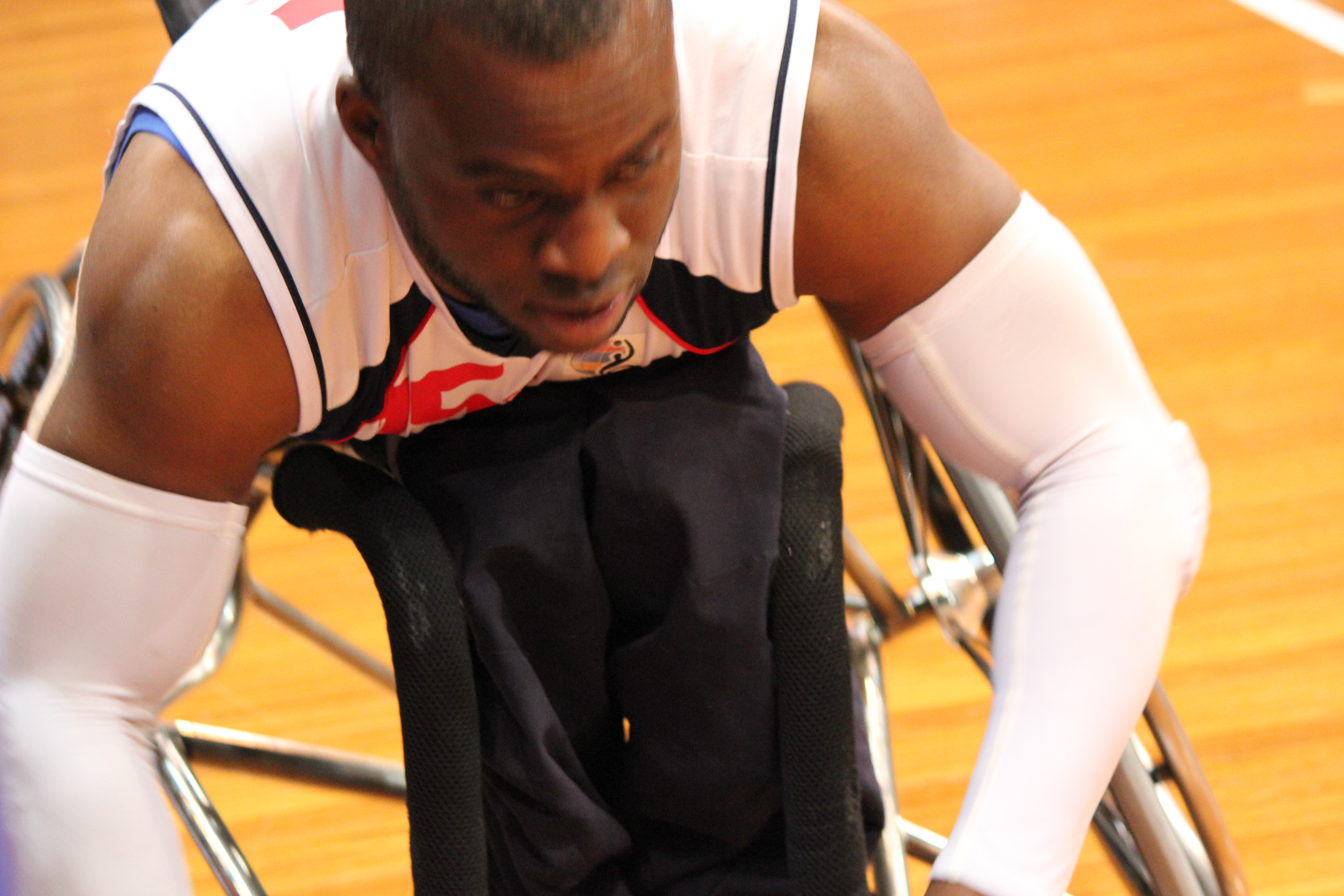
- Orogbemi at Gliders & Rollers World Challenge on 21 July 2012.

Personal information
- Full name: Ade Orogbemi
- Born: Ade Orogbemi; 11 May 1978 (age 48) Lagos, Nigeria

Sport
- Country: Great Britain
- Sport: Wheelchair basketball

Ade Orogbemi (born 11 May 1978) is a Nigerian-born British wheelchair basketball player. He was selected to play for Team GB in the 2012 Summer Paralympics in London.

== Personal life ==
Orogbemi was born in Lagos in Nigeria on 11 May 1978. He currently lives at Liverpool, Merseyside. Orogbemi grew up in East London after moving from Lagos. He was born with Poliomyelitis (polio).

In 2009 Orogbemi was jailed for six months for claiming £33,000 worth of housing benefit, council tax benefit and income support. He admitted to three accounts of fraud.

== Wheelchair basketball ==
In 1997, Orogbemi was stopped on the streets by the coach of the East London Bullets and joined the wheelchair basketball team. Ever since then, he has competed in wheelchair basketball. After moving to Liverpool, he played for clubs such as Liverpool Greenbank, Tameside Owls and Wolverhampton Rhinos. He has also played with Toledo, a Spanish wheelchair basketball team. Orogbemi has been classed as a 2.5 player.

In 2001, he played in his first championship, the European Championships, held in Amsterdam in the Netherlands. Along with his team, he was fourth place. In 2003, Orogbemi played at the European Championships in Sassari, Italy, winning bronze. Two years later, he was in Paris, France in the 2005 European Championships, and won silver with his team. He played his first World Championships in 2006, in Amsterdam, where the team were fifth. The following year, he participated in his first Paralympics, the 2008 Summer Paralympic Games, held in Beijing. Along with Team GB, he finished in the bronze medal position. In 2010, at the World Wheelchair Basketball Championships in Birmingham, he finished in fifth place. 2011 saw Orogbemi's first victory, at the European Championships in Nazareth, Israel.
