= Australia at the 2008 Summer Paralympics =

- IPC code: AUS
- NPC: Australian Paralympic Committee
- Website: www.paralympic.org.au

in Beijing
- Competitors: 167 in 13 sports
- Flag bearers: Russell Short (Opening); Matthew Cowdrey (Closing)
- Officials: 122
- Medals Ranked 5th: Gold 23 Silver 29 Bronze 27 Total 79

Summer Paralympics appearances (overview)
- 1960; 1964; 1968; 1972; 1976; 1980; 1984; 1988; 1992; 1996; 2000; 2004; 2008; 2012; 2016; 2020; 2024

Australia sent a delegation to compete at the 2008 Summer Paralympics in Beijing. The country sent 167 (95 male and 72 female) athletes in 13 sports (out of 20) and 122 officials. It was the country's largest ever Paralympic delegation to an away Games. The team sent to Beijing was described as the emergence of the new generation of Australian athletes with 56 percent of the team attending their first Paralympic Games. The delegation's chef de mission was Darren Peters.

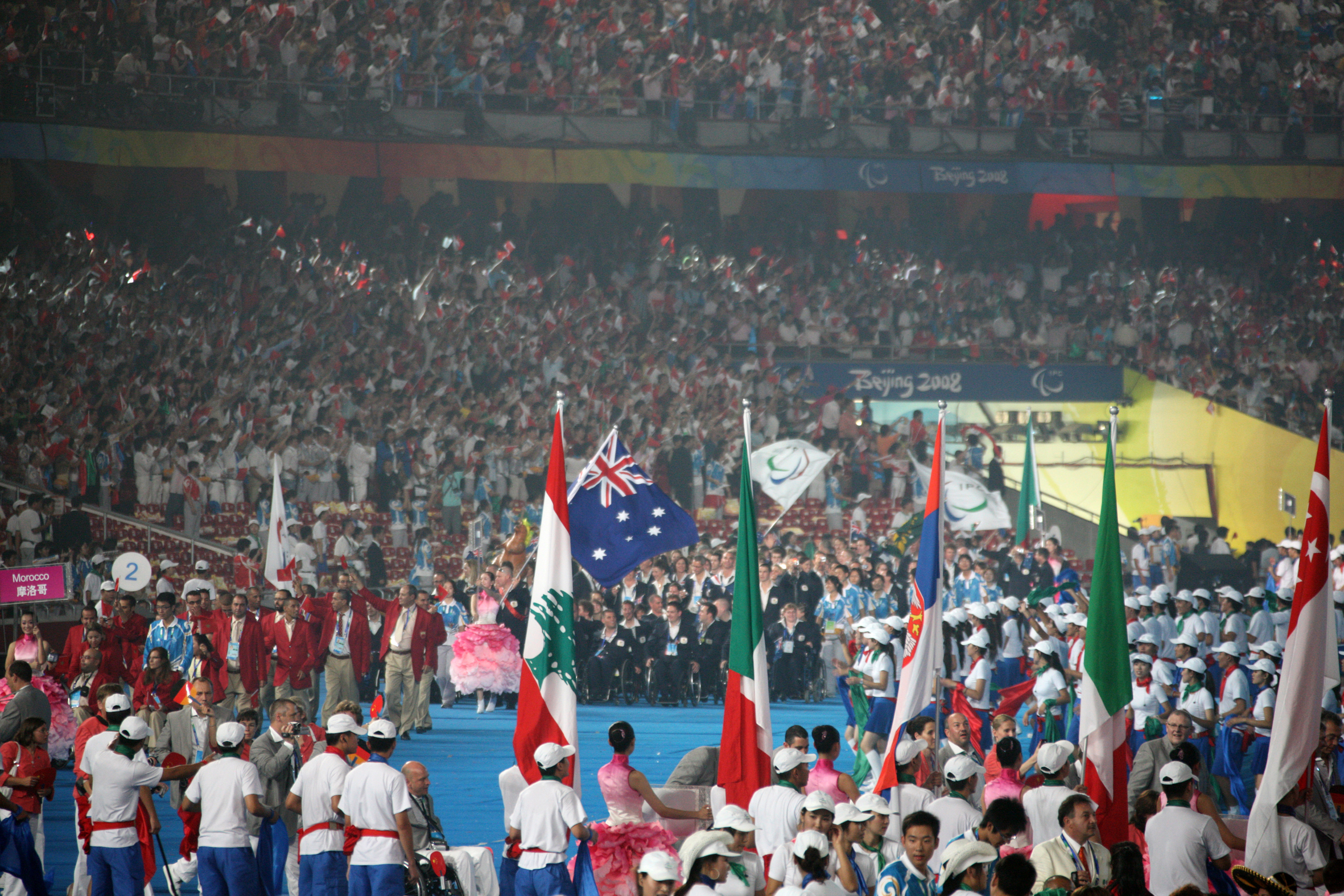
Australian team enters the stadium at the opening ceremony

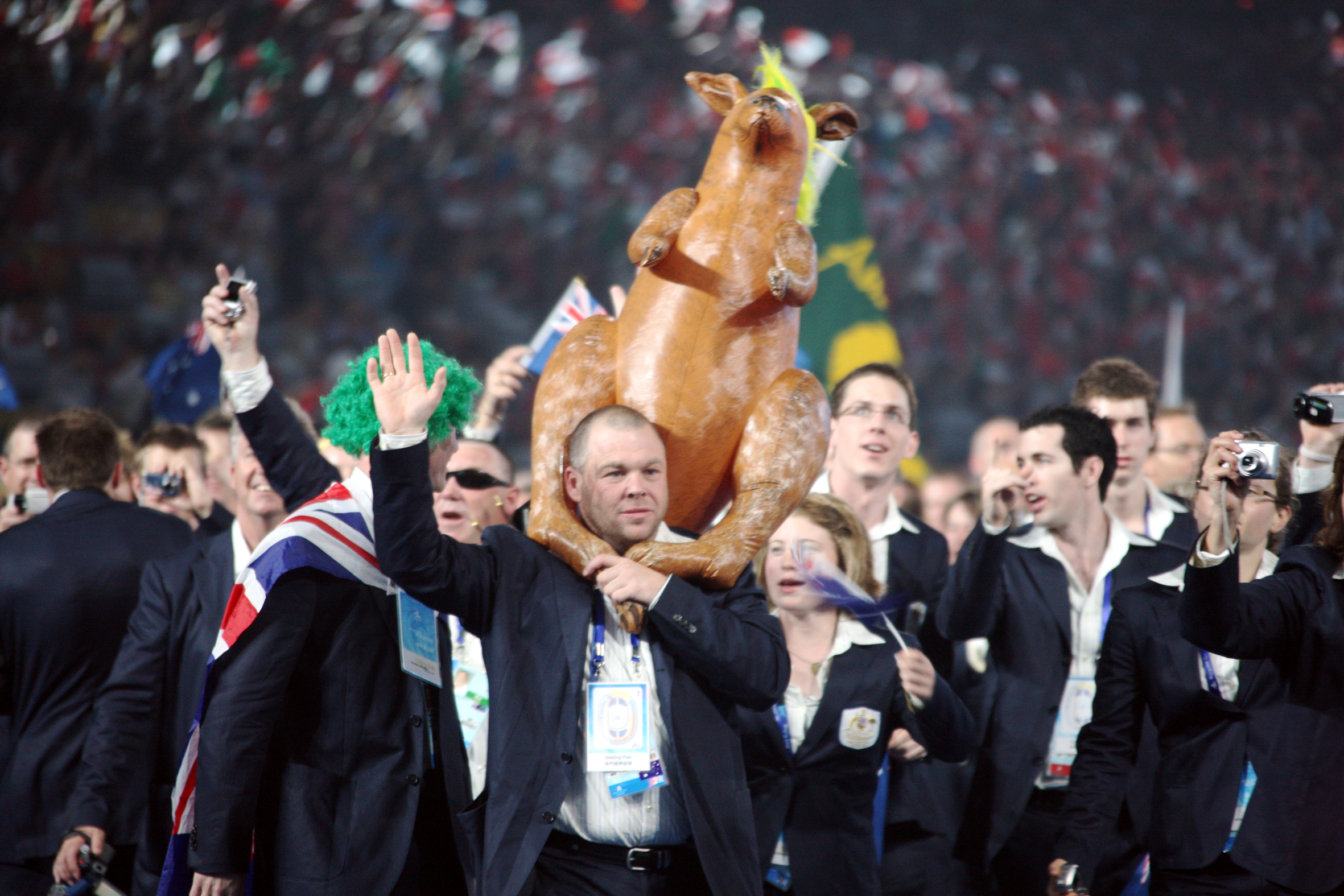
Australian team at the 2008 Beijing Paralympics opening ceremony

Australia won 23 gold, 29 silver and 27 bronze medals. It finished fourth on the total medal tally and fifth on the gold medal tally. Major sporting achievements for the Australian team included:

- Matt Cowdrey, an arm amputee swimmer, winning five gold and three silver medals to be the Games' leading athlete.
- Peter Leek, a cerebral palsy swimmer, winning eight medals including three gold.
- Heath Francis, an arm amputee sprinter and Evan O'Hanlon, cerebral palsy sprinter winning three gold medals.
- Kurt Fearnley, a wheelchair racer, winning the marathon for the second time.
- Australian men's wheelchair basketball team winning gold.
- 98 Australian athletes won a medal.
- Australian athletes: 21 new world records, 31 Paralympic records, 79 Australian records and 164 personal bests.

== Medalists ==
Medal	Name	Sport	Event
Gold	Evan O'Hanlon	Athletics	Men's 100 m T38
Gold	Evan O'Hanlon	Athletics	Men's 200 m T38
Gold	Heath Francis	Athletics	Men's 100 m T46
Gold	Heath Francis	Athletics	Men's 200 m T46
Gold	Heath Francis	Athletics	Men's 400 m T46
Gold	Kurt Fearnley	Athletics	Men's marathon T54
Gold	Lisa McIntosh	Athletics	Women's 100 m T37
Gold	Lisa McIntosh	Athletics	Women's 200 m T37
Gold	Christine Wolf	Athletics	Women's long jump F42
Gold	Evan O'Hanlon, Darren Thrupp, Christopher Mullins, Timothy Sullivan	Athletics	Men's 4 × 100 m T35-T38
Gold	Australia men's national wheelchair basketball team: Dylan Alcott; Brendan Dowler; Justin Eveson; Michael Hartnett; Adrian King; Tristan Knowles; Grant Mizens; Brad Ness; Shaun Norris; Troy Sachs; Tige Simmons; Brett Stibners	Wheelchair Basketball	Men's tournament
Gold	Michael Gallagher	Cycling	Men's individual pursuit LC1
Gold	Kieran Modra, Tyson Lawrence	Cycling	Men's individual pursuit B&VI
Gold	Christopher Scott	Cycling	Men's individual pursuit CP4
Gold	Matt Cowdrey	Swimming	Men's 100 m freestyle S9
Gold	Matt Cowdrey	Swimming	Men's 100 m backstroke S9
Gold	Matt Cowdrey	Swimming	Men's 50 m freestyle S9
Gold	Matt Cowdrey	Swimming	Men's 200 m individual medley SM9
Gold	Peter Leek	Swimming	Men's 100 m butterfly S8
Gold	Peter Leek	Swimming	Men's 200 m individual medley SM8
Gold	Rick Pendleton	Swimming	Men's 200 m individual medley SM10
Gold	Katrina Porter	Swimming	Women's 100 m backstroke S7
Gold	Ben Austin, Daniel Bell, Sam Bramham, Matthew Cowdrey, Peter Leek, Matthew Levy, Ricardo Moffatti, Rick Pendleton	Swimming	Men's 4 × 100 m medley relay (34 points)
Silver	Richard Colman	Athletics	Men's 200 m T53
Silver	Brad Scott	Athletics	Men's 800 m T37
Silver	Kurt Fearnley	Athletics	Men's 800 m T54
Silver	Kurt Fearnley	Athletics	Men's 5000 m T54
Silver	Aaron Chatman	Athletics	Men's high jump F44/46
Silver	Paul Raison	Athletics	Men's shot put F44
Silver	Angela Ballard, Christie Dawes, Madison de Rozario, Jemima Moore	Athletics	Women's 4 × 100 m T53-T54
Silver	Kath Proudfoot	Athletics	Women's shot put F35-36
Silver	Amanda Fraser	Athletics	Women's shot put F37-38
Silver	Christopher Scott	Cycling	Men's road time trial CP4
Silver	Ben Demery, Shaun Hopkins	Cycling	Men's 1km time trial B&VI
Silver	Ben Demery, Shaun Hopkins	Cycling	Men's sprint (B&VI 1–3)
Silver	Lindy Hou, Toireasa Gallagher	Cycling	Individual pursuit B&VI 1–3
Silver	Felicity Johnson, Katie Parker	Cycling	Women's 1km time trial (B&VI 1–3)
Silver	Darren Gardiner	Powerlifting	Men's 100 +kg
Silver	Kathryn Ross, John Maclean	Rowing	Mixed double sculls
Silver	Daniel Fitzgibbon, Rachael Cox	Sailing	2-person keelboat SKUD 18
Silver	Michael Anderson	Swimming	Men's 100 m backstroke S10
Silver	Sarah Bowen	Swimming	Women's 100 m breaststroke SB6
Silver	Blake Cochrane	Swimming	Men's 100 m breaststroke SB7
Silver	Ellie Cole	Swimming	Women's 100 m butterfly S9
Silver	Matt Cowdrey	Swimming	Men's 100 m butterfly S9
Silver	Matt Cowdrey	Swimming	Men's 400 m freestyle S9
Silver	Marayke Jonkers	Swimming	Women's 150 m individual medley SM4
Silver	Peter Leek	Swimming	Men's 100 m backstroke S8
Silver	Peter Leek	Swimming	Men's 400 m freestyle S8
Silver	Peter Leek	Swimming	Men's 50 m freestyle S8
Silver	Ben Austin, Sam Bramham, Matt Cowdrey, Peter Leek	Swimming	Men's 4 × 100 m freestyle relay (34 points)
Silver	Australia national wheelchair rugby team: Bryce Alman; Ryley Batt; Grant Boxall; Shane Brand; Cameron Carr; Nazim Erdem; George Hucks; Steve Porter; Ryan Scott; Greg Smith; Scott Vitale	Wheelchair Rugby	Men's tournament
Bronze	Richard Colman	Athletics	Men's 400 m T53
Bronze	Kurt Fearnley	Athletics	Men's 1500 m T54
Bronze	Christine Wolf	Athletics	Women's 100 m T42
Bronze	Julie Smith	Athletics	Women's 200 m T46
Bronze	Madeleine Hogan	Athletics	Women's javelin F42-46
Bronze	Jodi Willis-Roberts	Athletics	Women's shot put F12-13
Bronze	Aaron Chatman, Heath Francis, Paul Raison, Stephen Wilson	Athletics	Men's 4 × 100 m relay T42-46
Bronze	Australia women's national wheelchair basketball team: Clare Burzynski; Shelley Chaplin; Cobi Crispin; Melanie Domaschenz; Kylie Gauci; Melanie Hall; Katie Hill; Bridie Kean; Tina McKenzie; Kathleen O'Kelly-Kennedy; Sarah Stewart; Liesl Tesch	Wheelchair Basketball	Women's tournament
Bronze	Lindy Hou, Toireasa Gallagher	Cycling	Women's 1km time trial B&VI 1–3
Bronze	Kieran Modra, Tyson Lawrence	Cycling	Men's 1km time trial B&VI 1–3
Bronze	Bryce Lindores, Steven George	Cycling	Men's individual pursuit B&VI 1–3
Bronze	Jayme Paris	Cycling	Women's 500m time trial LC3–4/CP 3
Bronze	Christopher Scott	Cycling	Men's 1km time trial CP 4
Bronze	Greg Ball	Cycling	Men's 1km time trial LC 3–4
Bronze	Michael Gallagher	Cycling	Men's road race LC 1–2/CP 4
Bronze	Georgia Bruce	Equestrian	Mixed Dressage – Championship grade IV
Bronze	Georgia Bruce	Equestrian	Mixed Dressage – Freestyle grade IV
Bronze	Russell Boaden, Colin Harrison, Graeme Martin	Sailing	3-person keelboat Sonar
Bronze	Ellie Cole	Swimming	Women's 400 m freestyle S9
Bronze	Ellie Cole	Swimming	Women's 100 m backstroke S9
Bronze	Jay Dohnt	Swimming	Men's 400 m freestyle S7
Bronze	Jacqueline Freney	Swimming	Women's 400 m freestyle S8
Bronze	Jacqueline Freney	Swimming	Women's 100 m freestyle S8
Bronze	Jacqueline Freney	Swimming	Women's 50 m freestyle S8
Bronze	Peter Leek	Swimming	Men's 100 m freestyle S8
Bronze	Kat Lewis	Swimming	Women's 50 m freestyle S10
Bronze	Annabelle Williams	Swimming	Women's 100 m butterfly S9

Medals by discipline
Discipline	Gold medal	Silver medal	Bronze medal	Total
Archery	0	0	0	0
Athletics	10	9	7	26
Wheelchair basketball	1	0	1	2
Boccia	0	0	0	0
Cycling	3	5	7	15
Equestrian	0	0	2	2
Wheelchair fencing	0	0	0	0
Football five-a-side	0	0	0	0
Football seven-a-side	0	0	0	0
Judo	0	0	0	0
Powerlifting	0	1	0	1
Rowing	0	1	0	1
Wheelchair rugby	0	1	0	1
Sailing	0	1	1	2
Shooting	0	0	0	0
Swimming	9	11	9	29
Table tennis	0	0	0	0
Wheelchair tennis	0	0	0	0
Total	23	29	27	79

== Events ==
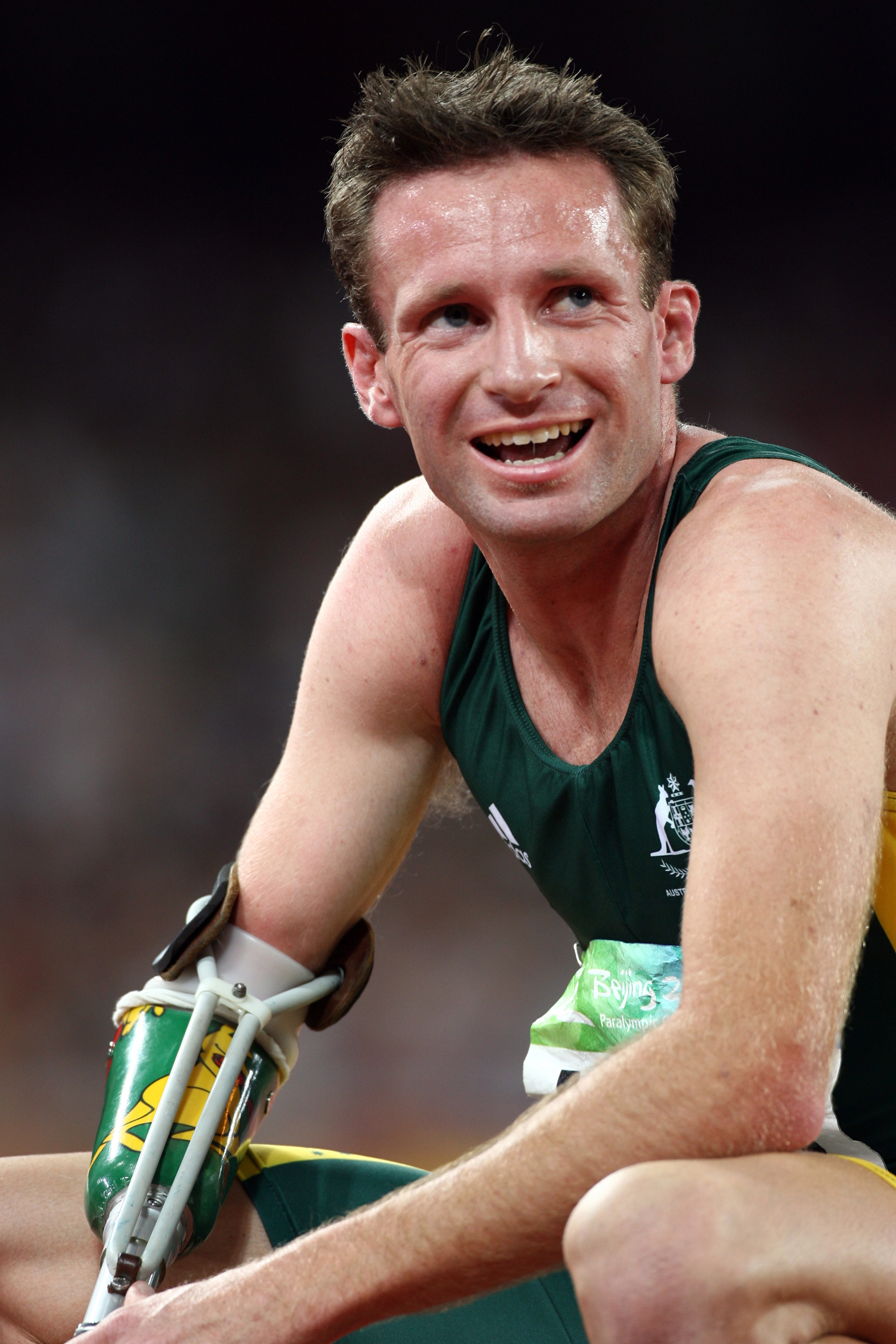
Heath Francis

=== Athletics ===
Jodi Willis-Roberts, Russell Short, and Darren Thrupp competed at their sixth Paralympics. Jessica Gallagher was selected in the team but was classified ineligible to compete. She attended the Games as a member of staff. Australian athletes set six world records, a further three Paralympic records and 16 Australian records during the Games. Heath Francis and Evan O'Hanlon won three gold medals.

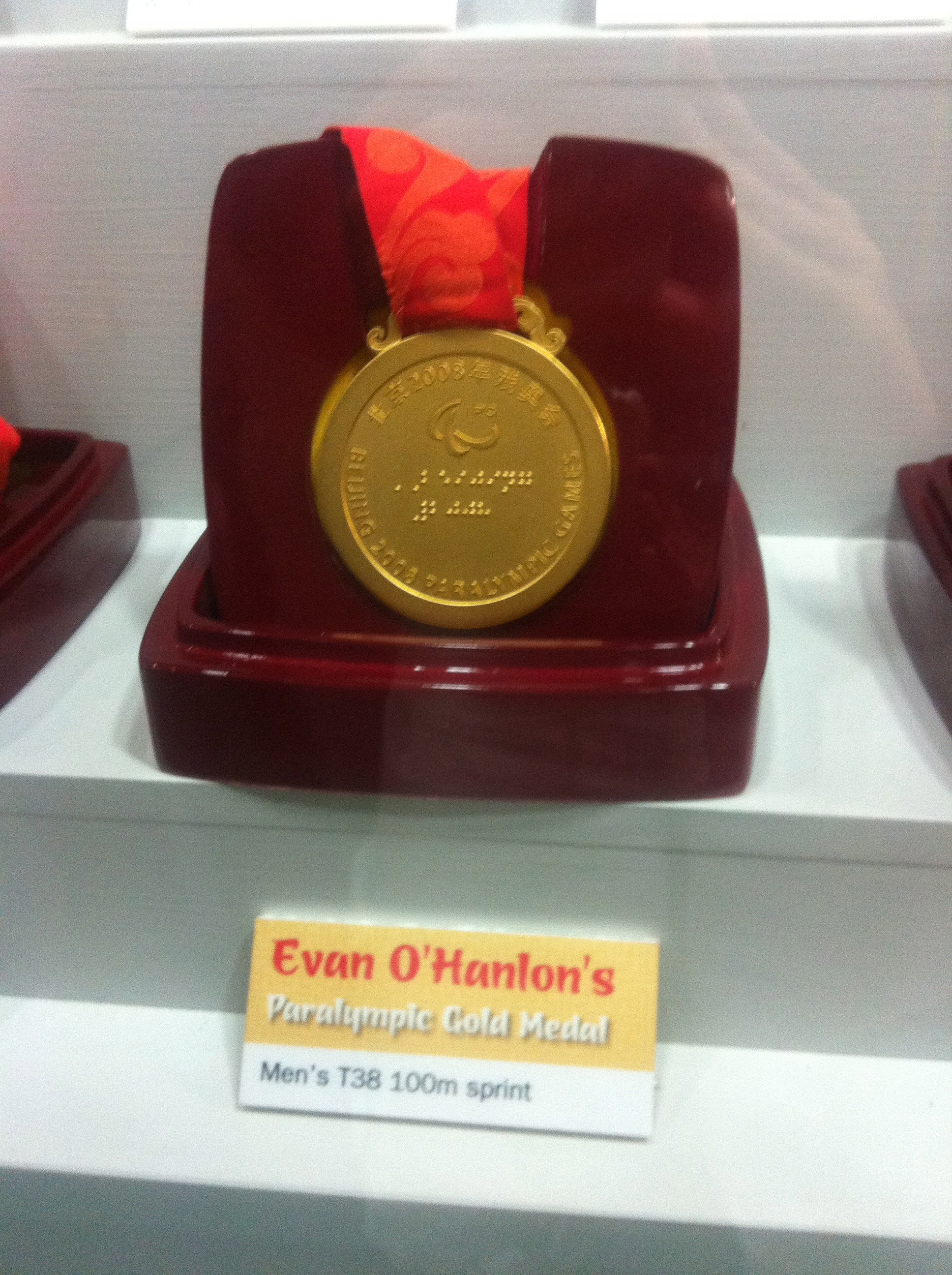
A medal won by O'Hanlon at the 2008 Summer Paralympics on display at the Australian Institute of Sport

==== Men's track ====
Athlete	Class	Event	Heats		Semifinal		Final	
Athlete	Class	Event	Result	Rank	Result	Rank	Result	Rank
Jonathan Bernard (guide Paul Pearce)	T12	400m	52.11	11	did not advance			
Matthew Cameron	T54	100m	14.92	12	did not advance			
Richard Colman	T53	200m	26.80	2 Q	—N/a		26.71	2nd place, silver medalist(s)
Richard Colman	T53	400m	52.38	4 Q	—N/a		48.92	3rd place, bronze medalist(s)
Richard Colman	T53	800m	1:39.90	6 Q	—N/a		1:37.49	4
Richard Colman	T54	1500m	3:08.18	5 Q	3:02.19	9	did not advance	
Roy Daniell (guide Christopher Tagg)	T12	Marathon	—N/a				2:40:47	13
Kurt Fearnley	T54	800m	1:38.79	4 Q	1:39.39	6 Q	1:36.76	2nd place, silver medalist(s)
Kurt Fearnley	T54	1500m	3:06.96	1 Q	3:00.15	2 Q	3:14.28	3rd place, bronze medalist(s)
Kurt Fearnley	T54	5000m	10:13.21 PR	1 Q	—N/a		10:22.97	2nd place, silver medalist(s)
Kurt Fearnley	T54	Marathon	—N/a				1:23:17 PR	1st place, gold medalist(s)
Heath Francis	T46	100m	11.07	1 Q	—N/a		11.05	1st place, gold medalist(s)
Heath Francis	T46	200m	22.13	1 Q	—N/a		21.74 WR	1st place, gold medalist(s)
Heath Francis	T46	400m	49.39	1 Q	—N/a		47.69 WR	1st place, gold medalist(s)
Gerrard Gosens (guide Bruce Jones)	T11	1500m	4:21.00	6 q	—N/a		4:24.65	6
Christopher Mullins	T38	200m	25.51	14	did not advance			
Christopher Mullins	T38	400m	—N/a				54.59	6
Richard Nicholson	T54	100m	14.87	9	did not advance			
Richard Nicholson	T54	200m	26.37	14	did not advance			
Richard Nicholson	T54	400m	50.36	20	did not advance			
Evan O'Hanlon	T38	100m	—N/a				10.96 WR	1st place, gold medalist(s)
Evan O'Hanlon	T38	200m	22.98	1 Q	—N/a		21.98 WR	1st place, gold medalist(s)
Michael Roeger	T46	800m	2:00.40	11	did not advance			
Michael Roeger	T46	1500m	4:09.62	7 Q	—N/a		3:59.21	8
Michael Roeger	T46	5000m	—N/a				15:36.95	11
Brad Scott	T37	200m	25.06	2 Q	—N/a		25.09	4
Brad Scott	T37	800m	—N/a				2:02.71	2nd place, silver medalist(s)
Ian Speed (guide Zac Ashkansky)	T12	800m	2:01.48	9	did not advance			
Tim Sullivan	T38	100m	—N/a				11.91	7
Tim Sullivan	T38	200m	23.74	7 Q	—N/a		23.62	7
Tim Sullivan	T38	400m	—N/a				DSQ	
Darren Thrupp	T37	100m	12.54	7 q	—N/a		12.59	7
Stephen Wilson	T44	100m	11.87	5 Q	—N/a		11.78	5
Stephen Wilson	T44	400m	—N/a				55.49	5
Christopher Mullins; Evan O'Hanlon; Tim Sullivan; Darren Thrupp	T35-38	4 × 100 m relay	—N/a				44.81 WR	1st place, gold medalist(s)
Aaron Chatman; Heath Francis; Paul Raison; Stephen Wilson	T42-46	4 × 100 m relay	—N/a				45.80	3rd place, bronze medalist(s)
Matthew Cameron; Richard Colman; Kurt Fearnley; Richard Nicholson	T53-54	4 × 100 m relay	52.60	3 Q	—N/a		DSQ	

==== Men's field ====
Athlete	Class	Event	Final		
Athlete	Class	Event	Result	Points	Rank
Damien Bowen	F33-34/52	Javelin throw	26.52	994	7
Aaron Chatman	F44/46	High jump	2.02	1011	2nd place, silver medalist(s)
Rodney Farr	F33-34/52	Javelin throw	17.55	1003	6
Rodney Farr	F33-34/52	Shot put	8.49	930	11
Greg Hibberd	F33-34/52	Shot put	10.83	1004	5
Hamish MacDonald	F33-34/52	Shot put	10.82	1003	6
Wade McMahon	F37-38	Javelin throw	46.71 SB	970	4
Paul Raison	F44	Discus throw	49.77	921	5
Paul Raison	F44	Shot put	15.83	988	2nd place, silver medalist(s)
Russell Short	F11-12	Shot put	14.79	912	6
Darren Thrupp	F37-38	Long jump	5.82 SB	1011	5

==== Women's track ====
Athlete	Class	Event	Heats		Semifinal		Final	
Athlete	Class	Event	Result	Rank	Result	Rank	Result	Rank
Angela Ballard	T53	100m	18.19	6 Q	—N/a		17.89	5
Angela Ballard	T53	200m	32.36	7 q	—N/a		31.81	7
Angela Ballard	T53	400m	1:01.02	6 Q	—N/a		59.82	7
Angela Ballard	T53	800m	—N/a				2:02.56	6
Carlee Beattie	T46	100m	13.70	15	did not advance			
Carlee Beattie	T46	200m	28.05	15	did not advance			
Gemma Buchholz	T52	100m	—N/a				24.64	8
Gemma Buchholz	T52	200m	—N/a				44.57	8
Kelly Cartwright	T42	100m	—N/a				18.36	6
Christie Dawes	T54	800m	2:00.21	11	did not advance			
Christie Dawes	T54	1500m	3:35.80	10	did not advance			
Christie Dawes	T54	5000m	—N/a				12:31.66	6
Madison de Rozario	T54	100m	17.44	8 Q	—N/a		17.21	8
Madison de Rozario	T54	400m	59.78	10	did not advance			
Courtney Harbeck	T13	100m	13.03	9	did not advance			
Courtney Harbeck	T13	200m	27.73	10	did not advance			
Lisa McIntosh	T37	100m	14.27	1 Q	—N/a		14.14	1st place, gold medalist(s)
Lisa McIntosh	T37	200m	29.18	1 Q	—N/a		29.28	1st place, gold medalist(s)
Kirrilee McPherson	T38	100m	15.29	9	did not advance			
Kirrilee McPherson	T38	200m	31.97	10	did not advance			
Jemima Moore	T54	200m	32.99	11	did not advance			
Katy Parrish	T38	100m	14.31	4 Q	—N/a		DNS	
Katy Parrish	T38	200m	30.46	5 Q	—N/a		30.46	5
Tahlia Rotumah	T37	100m	15.22	10	did not advance			
Tahlia Rotumah	T37	200m	31.79	9	did not advance			
Julie Smith	T46	100m	12.65	3 Q	—N/a		12.74	4
Julie Smith	T46	200m	26.37	2 Q	—N/a		26.03	3rd place, bronze medalist(s)
Christine Wolf	T42	100m	—N/a				17.49	3rd place, bronze medalist(s)
Angela Ballard; Christie Dawes; Madison de Rozario; Jemima Moore	T53-54	4 × 100 m relay	—N/a				1:01.91	2nd place, silver medalist(s)

==== Women's field ====
Athlete	Class	Event	Final		
Athlete	Class	Event	Result	Points	Rank
Jennifer Bryce	F54-56	Javelin throw	17.88	898	11
Jennifer Bryce	F54-56	Shot put	7.85 SB	954	8
Louise Ellery	F32-34/52-53	Shot put	5.07	997	6
Amanda Fraser	F37-38	Discus throw	29.73 SB	1012	2nd place, silver medalist(s)
Amanda Fraser	F37-38	Shot put	10.52 SB	1026	4
Madeleine Hogan	F42-46	Javelin throw	38.89 SB	1062	3rd place, bronze medalist(s)
Brydee Moore	F32-34/51-53	Discus throw	16.02	1061	5
Brydee Moore	F32-34/52-53	Shot put	6.38	1005	5
Brydee Moore	F33-34/52-53	Javelin throw	11.60	856	13
Kath Proudfoot	F35-36	Discus throw	23.91	1111	2nd place, silver medalist(s)
Kath Proudfoot	F35-36	Shot put	8.35	938	4
Charlotte Saville	F35-38	Javelin throw	22.78	959	10
Noni Thompson	F35-36	Discus throw	15.21	707	10
Noni Thompson	F35-36	Shot put	6.07	682	11
Jodi Willis-Roberts	F12-13	Shot put	11.21	898	3rd place, bronze medalist(s)
Christine Wolf	F42	Long jump	3.73 WR	-	1st place, gold medalist(s)

Coaches – Scott Goodman (Head Coach), Alison O'Riordan, Andrew Dawes, Brett Jones, Louise Sauvage, Iryna Dvoskina, John Minns, John Eden, Alan Makin, Cathy Raha-Lambert

Officials – Gary Lees (Section Manager), Louise Mogg (Section Manager), Andrew Carter, Rowena Toppenberg, Sian Pugh, Mick Jordan, Phil Power, Steve Butler, Stephanie Martin, Jessica Gallagher

=== Cycling ===
Included on the Australian team was Michael Milton, a four-time gold medalist as a skier in the Winter Paralympics. Mark le Flohic, gold medalist at the 2000 and 2004 Summer Paralympics, was to take part in the Beijing Games but had to pull out due to injury. Le Flohic broke his collar bone during training one week before the Games were to begin.

==== Men's road ====
Athlete	Event	Time	Rank
Michael Gallagher	Men's road time trial LC1	35:29.74	5
Michael Gallagher	Men's road race LC1/LC2/CP4	1:46:03	3rd place, bronze medalist(s)
Michael Milton	Men's road race LC1/LC2/CP4	1:49:29	21
Christopher Scott	Men's road time trial CP4	35:55.99	2nd place, silver medalist(s)
Christopher Scott	Men's road race LC1/LC2/CP4	1:46:18	14
Bryce Lindores; Steven George (pilot)	Men's road race B&VU 1-3	DNF	
Kieran Modra; Tyson Lawrence (pilot)	Men's road time trial B&VI 1-3	33:03.24	5
Kieran Modra; Tyson Lawrence (pilot)	Men's road race B&VI 1-3	2:24:55	11

==== Men's track ====
Athlete	Event	Qualification		Quarterfinals		Semifinals		Final	
Athlete	Event	Time	Rank	Time	Rank	Time	Rank	Opposition Time	Rank
Greg Ball	Men's 1km time trial LC3-4	—N/a						1:17.681	3rd place, bronze medalist(s)
Michael Gallagher	Men's 1km time trial LC1	—N/a						1:11.01	4
Michael Gallagher	Men's individual pursuit LC1	4:40.65 PR	1 Q	—N/a				Sacher (GER); W 4:43.28	1st place, gold medalist(s)
Michael Milton	Men's 1km time trial LC3-4	—N/a						1:21.578	9
Michael Milton	Men's individual pursuit LC3	4:10.44	8	did not advance					
Christopher Scott	Men's 1km time trial CP4	—N/a						1:12.23	3rd place, bronze medalist(s)
Christopher Scott	Men's individual pursuit CP4	3:38.205	2 Q	—N/a				Ishi (JPN); W 3:40.144	1st place, gold medalist(s)
Ben Demery; Shaun Hopkins (pilot)	Men's 1km time trial B&VI 1-3	—N/a						1:03.718	2nd place, silver medalist(s)
Ben Demery; Shaun Hopkins (pilot)	Men's sprint	10.629	2 Q	Arciniegas (COL); Carreno (COL); W 11.053; W 11.405	Q	Kilpatrick (RSA); Thomson (RSA); W 11.553	Q	Kappes (GBR); Storey (GBR); L	2nd place, silver medalist(s)
Bryce Lindores; Steven George (pilot)	Men's 1km time trial B&VI 1-3	—N/a						1:04.792	6
Bryce Lindores; Steven George (pilot)	Men's individual pursuit B&VI 1-3	4:27.578	4 q	—N/a				Chalifour (CAN); Cloutier (CAN); W 4:26.626	3rd place, bronze medalist(s)
Kieran Modra; Tyson Lawrence (pilot)	Men's 1km time trial B&VI 1-3	—N/a						1:04.053	3rd place, bronze medalist(s)
Kieran Modra; Tyson Lawrence (pilot)	Men's individual pursuit B&VI 1-3	4:18.961 WR	1 Q	—N/a				Venge (ESP); Llaurado (ESP); W 4:18.166 WR	1st place, gold medalist(s)
Greg Ball; Michael Gallagher; Christopher Scott	Men's team sprint	54.585	4 q	—N/a				Czech Republic (CZE); L 54.239	4

==== Women's road ====
Athlete	Event	Time	Rank
Jane Armstrong	Women's LC3/LC4/CP3	50:51.82	10
Mel Leckie	Women's road time trial HC A/HC B/HC C	30:32.61	6
Mel Leckie	Women's road race HC A/B/C	1:31:14	8
Jayme Paris	Women's road time trial LC3/LC4/CP3	52:51.82	8
Lindy Hou; Toireasa Gallagher (pilot)	Women's road time trial B&VI 1-3	39:01:62	4
Lindy Hou; Toireasa Gallagher (pilot)	Women's road race B&VI 1-3	2:01:17	4

==== Women's track ====
Athlete	Event	Qualification		1st round		Final	
Athlete	Event	Time	Rank	Time	Rank	Opposition Time	Rank
Jane Armstrong	Women's individual pursuit LC3-4/CP3	4:35.768	7	did not advance			
Jane Armstrong	Women's 1km time trial LC3-4/CP3	—N/a				45.402	4
Jayme Paris	Women's individual pursuit LC3-4/CP3	4:24.666	4 q	—N/a		Tesoriero (NZL); L 4:26.587	4
Jayme Paris	Women's 1km time trial LC3-4/CP3	—N/a				44.490	3rd place, bronze medalist(s)
Lindy Hou; Katie Parker (pilot - time trial); Toireasa Gallagher (pilot - ind. pursuit)	Women's individual pursuit B&VI 1-3	3:38.085	1 Q	—N/a		McGlynn (GBR); Hunter (GBR); L 3:41.494	2nd place, silver medalist(s)
Lindy Hou; Katie Parker (pilot - time trial); Toireasa Gallagher (pilot - ind. pursuit)	Women's 1km time trial B&VI 1-3	—N/a				1:12.463	3rd place, bronze medalist(s)
Felicity Johnson; Katie Parker (pilot)	Women's 1km time trial B&VI 1-3	—N/a				1:10.465	2nd place, silver medalist(s)

Coaches – James Victor (Head Coach), Tom Skulander, Paul Martens Officials – Mark Fulcher (Section Manager), Brett Hidson, Anouska Edwards, Alan Downes, Mark Bullen, Stuart Smith, Murray Lydeamore.

=== Equestrian ===
==== Individual events ====
Athlete	Horse	Event	Total	
Athlete	Horse	Event	Score	Rank
Grace Bowman	Yv Mt Batton	Mixed individual championship test grade Ib	56.286	15
Grace Bowman	Yv Mt Batton	Mixed individual freestyle test grade Ib	61.611	12
Georgia Bruce	V Salute	Mixed individual championship test grade IV	68.258	3rd place, bronze medalist(s)
Georgia Bruce	V Salute	Mixed individual freestyle test grade IV	74.319	3rd place, bronze medalist(s)
Sharon Jarvis	Odorado	Mixed individual championship test grade III	69.200	4
Sharon Jarvis	Odorado	Mixed individual freestyle test grade III	69.446	7
Nicole Kullen	Nomination	Mixed individual championship test grade Ib	59.905	11
Nicole Kullen	Nomination	Mixed individual freestyle test grade Ib	66.110	4
Jan Pike	Griffin	Mixed individual championship test grade Ia	60.000	9
Jan Pike	Griffin	Mixed individual freestyle test grade Ia	65.555	7

==== Team ====
Athlete	Horse	Event	Individual score			Total	
Athlete	Horse	Event	TT	CT	Total	Score	Rank
Grace Bowman	See above	Team	58.235	56.286	114.521	388.092	6
Nicole Kullen	See above	Team	60.235	59.905	120.140*	388.092	6
Sharon Jarvis	See above	Team	62.923	69.200	132.123*	388.092	6
Georgia Bruce	See above	Team	67.571	68.258	135.829*	388.092	6

* Indicated the three best individual scores that count towards the team total.

Coaches – Mary Longden (Head Coach), David Bowman, Sally Francis Officials – Ken Dagley (Chef d’Equipe), Doug Denby, Nicola Reynoldson, Michelle Goodrick, Judy Fyfe, Margaret Keyes, Emma Bardot, Ebony Tucker, Terrina Fairbrother, Liz Wright-Smith, Chris Elliott, Carolyn Lieutenant.

=== Judo ===
==== Men ====
Athlete	Event	First Round	Quarterfinals	Semifinals	Repechage round 1	Repechage round 2	Final/ Bronze medal contest
Athlete	Event	Opposition Result	Opposition Result	Opposition Result	Opposition Result	Opposition Result	Opposition Result
Anthony Clarke	Men's 90kg	—N/a	Kretsul (RUS); L 0000–1000	—N/a	Vazquez (ESP); L 0000-0121	did not advance	

=== Powerlifting ===
==== Men ====
Athlete	Event	Result	Rank
Abebe Fekadu	56kg	155.0	10
Darren Gardiner	+100kg	230.0	2nd place, silver medalist(s)

==== Women ====
Athlete	Event	Result	Rank
Deahnne McIntyre	+82.5kg	127.5	4

Coaches – Ray Epstein (Head Coach), Bill Nancarrow

=== Rowing ===
Rowing made its debut at the Beijing Games. There were four boat classes which all competed over a distance of 1000m. Australia competed in two of the four rowing events. Australian athletes Kathryn Ross and John Maclean competed in the trunk and arms mixed double skulls. They won the silver medal, however only missed out on the gold by 0.08 seconds. The gold was won by a crew from China.

Athlete	Event	Heats		Repechage		Final	
Athlete	Event	Time	Rank	Time	Rank	Time	Rank
Dominic Monypenny	Men's singles sculls	5:38.29	5 R	6:02.45	4 FA	5:59.92	6
John MacLean; Kathryn Ross	Mixed double sculls	4:18.66	3 R	4:31.24	1 FA	4:21.58	2nd place, silver medalist(s)

Coaches - Pedro Albisser (Head Coach), Rik Bryan Officials - Adam Horner (Section Manager)

=== Sailing ===
Athlete	Event	Race											Total points	Net points Total	Rank
Athlete	Event	1	2	3	4	5	6	7	8	9	10	11	Total points	Net points Total	Rank
Aaron Hill	1 person keelboat 2.4mR	(12)	10	10	8	10	(13)	6	8	10	11	—N/a	98	73	12
Daniel Fitzgibbon; Rachel Cox	2 person keelboat SKUD 18	(4)	2	2	2	2	4	(9)	3	1	2	Race; Cancelled	31	18	2nd place, silver medalist(s)
Colin Harrison; Jonathan Harris; Graeme Martin	3 person keelboat sonar	8	4	2	3	3	3	1	(10)	(15); OCS	5	7	61	36	3rd place, bronze medalist(s)

Coaches – Greg Omay (Head Coach), Adrian Finglas Officials – Sarina Macpherson (Section Manager), Linnea Korssell, Sue Crafer, Geoff Milligan, Timothy Lowe

=== Shooting ===
==== Men ====
Athlete	Event	Qualification		Final		
Athlete	Event	Score	Rank	Score	Total	Rank
Ashley Adams	Men's 10m air rifle standing SH1	593	2 Q	100.0	693.0	4
Ashley Adams	Men's 50m rifle 3 positions	1137	9	did not advance		
Ashley Adams	Mixed 10m air rifle prone SH1	599	11	did not advance		
Ashley Adams	Mixed 50m rifle prone SH1	590	2 Q	98.5	688.5	4
Sebastian Hume	Men's 10m air pistol SH1	553	22	did not advance		
Jason Maroney	Mixed 10m air rifle prone SH2	599	8 Q	104.9	703.9	6
Jason Maroney	Mixed 10m air rifle standing SH2	597	5 Q	103.6	700.6	5

==== Women ====
Athlete	Event	Qualification		Final		
Athlete	Event	Score	Rank	Score	Total	Rank
Libby Kosmala	Women's 10m air rifle standing SH1	390	2 Q	99.1	489.1	4
Libby Kosmala	Women's 50m rifle 3 positions SH1	556	9	did not advance		
Libby Kosmala	Mixed 10m air rifle prone SH1	597	19	did not advance		
Libby Kosmala	Mixed 50m rifle prone SH1	577	33	did not advance		

Coaches – Miroslav Sipek (Head Coach), Michelle Fletcher Officials – Nick Sullivan (Section Manager), Anne Bugden

=== Swimming ===
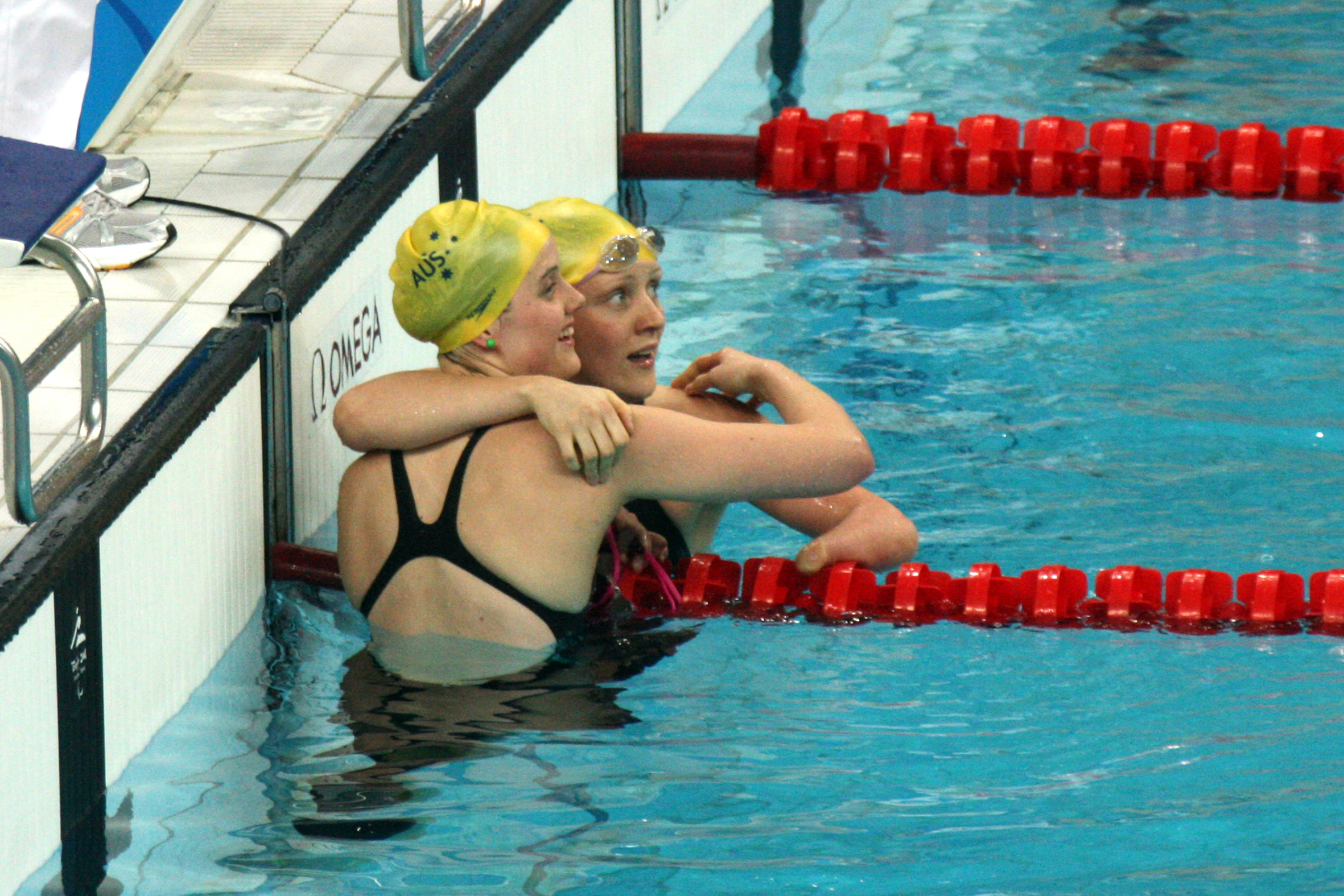
Australian swimmers Ellie Cole and Annabelle Williams at the Beijing 2008 Paralympic Games

There were eight men and eleven women making their Paralympic debut. Australia won 9 gold, 11 silver and 9 bronze medals placing it sixth on the swimming medal tally. It was Australia's most successful sport at the Games. Matthew Cowdrey (5 gold and 3 silver) and Peter Leek (3 gold, 4 silver and 1 bronze) were the standout swimmers.

==== Men ====
Athlete	Class	Event	Heats		Final	
Athlete	Class	Event	Result	Rank	Result	Rank
Michael Anderson	S10	100m backstroke	1:01.70 PR	2 Q	1:01.47	2nd place, silver medalist(s)
Michael Anderson	S10	50m freestyle	25.13	6 Q	25.04	6
Michael Anderson	S10	100m freestyle	56.08	11	did not advance	
Ben Austin	S8	100m butterfly	1:04.83	5 Q	1:03.50	5
Ben Austin	S8	50m freestyle	28.09	5 Q	27.82	5
Ben Austin	S8	100m freestyle	59.62 PR	2 Q	59.78	4
Daniel Bell	S10	100m butterfly	1:00.24	6 Q	59.85	5
Daniel Bell	SB9	100m breaststroke	1:14.33	9	did not advance	
Daniel Bell	SM10	200m individual medley	2:22.96	10	did not advance	
Sam Bramham	S9	100m butterfly	1:02.33	4 Q	1:02.58	7
Sam Bramham	S9	100m freestyle	58.97	11	did not advance	
Sam Bramham	S9	400m freestyle	4:25.67	3 Q	4:21.35	4
Blake Cochrane	S8	100m backstroke	1:17.72	12	did not advance	
Blake Cochrane	SB7	100m breaststroke	1:23.69	2 Q	1:23.36	2nd place, silver medalist(s)
Matthew Cowdrey	S9	100m backstroke	1:05.60	2 Q	1:03.34 WR	1st place, gold medalist(s)
Matthew Cowdrey	S9	100m butterfly	1:01.05	3 Q	59.46	2nd place, silver medalist(s)
Matthew Cowdrey	S9	50m freestyle	26.09	4 Q	25.34 WR	1st place, gold medalist(s)
Matthew Cowdrey	S9	100m freestyle	56.53	2 Q	55.30 WR	1st place, gold medalist(s)
Matthew Cowdrey	S9	400m freestyle	4:27.26	5 Q	4:17.28	2nd place, silver medalist(s)
Matthew Cowdrey	SM9	200m individual medley	2:20.62	2 Q	2:13.60 WR	1st place, gold medalist(s)
Jay Dohnt	S7	100m backstroke	1:24.88	12	did not advance	
Jay Dohnt	S7	100m freestyle	1:11.33	11	did not advance	
Jay Dohnt	S7	400m freestyle	5:06.65	4 Q	4:59.47	3rd place, bronze medalist(s)
Jay Dohnt	SM7	200m individual medley	3:03.73	10	did not advance	
Alex Hadley	S7	50m butterfly	37.10	10	did not advance	
Alex Hadley	S7	50m freestyle	30.76	4 Q	30.75	4
Alex Hadley	S7	100m freestyle	1:08.67	7 Q	1:07.90	6
Alex Hadley	S7	400m freestyle	5:18.23	7 Q	5:20.79	7
Brenden Hall	S9	400m freestyle	4:23.35 PR	1 Q	4:22.19	5
Peter Leek	S8	100m backstroke	1:07.54 PR	2 Q	1:07.28	2nd place, silver medalist(s)
Peter Leek	S8	100m butterfly	1:01.01	1 Q	1:00.95	1st place, gold medalist(s)
Peter Leek	S8	50m freestyle	27.69	2 Q	26.89	2nd place, silver medalist(s)
Peter Leek	S8	100m freestyle	59.00 PR	1 Q	59.14	3rd place, bronze medalist(s)
Peter Leek	S8	400m freestyle	4:35.87 PR	2 Q	4:31.16	2nd place, silver medalist(s)
Peter Leek	SM8	200m individual medley	2:25.72 PR	1 Q	2:20.92 WR	1st place, gold medalist(s)
Matt Levy	S8	50m freestyle	28.55	6 Q	29.68	8
Matt Levy	S8	400m freestyle	4:50.78	6 Q	4:51.77	7
Matt Levy	SM8	200m individual medley	2:39.40	6 Q	2:38.35	7
Jeremy McClure	S12	100m backstroke	1:05.95	7 Q	1:06.32	7
Jeremy McClure	S12	50m freestyle	27.58	14	did not advance	
Jeremy McClure	SB12	100m breaststroke	1:19.56	10	did not advance	
Ricardo Moffatti	S8	100m backstroke	1:13.56	6 Q	1:12.58	5
Ricardo Moffatti	S8	100m freestyle	1:00.67	5 Q	59.93	5
Stephen Osborne	S9	100m butterfly	1:06.33	13	did not advance	
Stephen Osborne	S9	50m freestyle	27.20	14	did not advance	
Stephen Osborne	S9	100m freestyle	59.70	18	did not advance	
Andrew Pasterfield	S10	100m backstroke	1:04.26	4 Q	1:04.24	7
Andrew Pasterfield	S10	50m freestyle	25.34	9	did not advance	
Andrew Pasterfield	S10	100m freestyle	56.03	10	did not advance	
Rick Pendleton	S10	100m butterfly	1:00.96	7 Q	59.87	6
Rick Pendleton	SB9	100m breaststroke	1:12.34	4 Q	1:10.88	4
Rick Pendleton	SM10	200m individual medley	2:18.76	1 Q	2:12.78 WR	1st place, gold medalist(s)
Jeremy Tidy	S10	100m backstroke	1:05.37	8 Q	1:05.26	8
Jeremy Tidy	S10	100m butterfly	1:01.73	11	did not advance	
Jeremy Tidy	S10	50m freestyle	25.83	12	did not advance	
Jeremy Tidy	S10	100m freestyle	55.72	9	did not advance	
Jeremy Tidy	SB9	100m breaststroke	1:16.04	11	did not advance	
Jeremy Tidy	SM10	200m individual medley	2:19.44	2 Q	2:19.76	6
Ben Austin; Sam Bramham; Matthew Cowdrey; Peter Leek	-	Men's 4 × 100 m freestyle relay	—N/a		3:53.59	2nd place, silver medalist(s)
Daniel Bell; Sam Bramham; Matt Levy; Ricardo Moffatti	-	Men's 4 × 100 m medley relay	4:33.02	4 Q	4:11.90 WR	1st place, gold medalist(s)

==== Women ====
Athlete	Class	Event	Heats		Final	
Athlete	Class	Event	Result	Rank	Result	Rank
Sarah Bowen	S6	100m backstroke	1:43.98	9	did not advance	
Sarah Bowen	SB6	100m breaststroke	1:44.44	2 Q	1:42.39	2nd place, silver medalist(s)
Sarah Bowen	SM6	200m individual medley	3:40.89	10	did not advance	
Ellie Cole	S9	100m backstroke	1:13.12	3 Q	1:11.87	3rd place, bronze medalist(s)
Ellie Cole	S9	100m butterfly	1:10.70	2 Q	1:10.92	2nd place, silver medalist(s)
Ellie Cole	S9	100m freestyle	1:05.11	5 Q	1:04.24	4
Ellie Cole	S9	400m freestyle	4:45.17	2 Q	4:44.60	3rd place, bronze medalist(s)
Ellie Cole	SM9	200m individual medley	2:42.26	5 Q	DNS	
Amanda Drennan	S9	100m backstroke	1:17.06	9	did not advance	
Amanda Drennan	S9	100m freestyle	1:06.81	12	did not advance	
Amanda Drennan	S9	400m freestyle	5:04.62	8 Q	5:07.24	8
Jacqueline Freney	S8	50m freestyle	32.49	4 Q	32.37	3rd place, bronze medalist(s)
Jacqueline Freney	S8	100m freestyle	1:09.92	2 Q	1:08.56	3rd place, bronze medalist(s)
Jacqueline Freney	S8	400m freestyle	5:02.32	3 Q	4:57.21	3rd place, bronze medalist(s)
Samantha Gandolfo	S10	50m freestyle	31.15	11	did not advance	
Samantha Gandolfo	S10	100m freestyle	1:05.12	8 Q	1:05.74	8
Samantha Gandolfo	S10	400m freestyle	4:48.90	3 Q	4:48.02	5
Samantha Gandolfo	SM10	200m individual medley	2:49.45	9	did not advance	
Marayke Jonkers	SM4	150m individual medley	—N/a		3:28.88	2nd place, silver medalist(s)
Katrina Lewis	S10	50m freestyle	28.91	1 Q	29.13	3rd place, bronze medalist(s)
Sian Lucas	S10	100m backstroke	1:14.64	5 Q	1:14.66	5
Sian Lucas	S10	100m freestyle	1:07.05	11	did not advance	
Sian Lucas	S10	400m freestyle	4:52.14	6 Q	4:49.98	8
Hannah MacDougall	S10	100m backstroke	1:17.87	9	did not advance	
Hannah MacDougall	SM10	200m individual medley	2:53.34	10	did not advance	
Tarryn McGaw	S10	100m backstroke	1:16.58	7 Q	1:15.66	7
Tarryn McGaw	S10	50m freestyle	30.56	10	did not advance	
Tarryn McGaw	S10	100m freestyle	1:05.03	7 Q	1:04.83	7
Tarryn McGaw	S10	400m freestyle	5:03.42	8 Q	4:49.79	7
Tarryn McGaw	SM10	200m individual medley	2:45.89	7 Q	2:46.57	7
Rhiannon Oliver	S8	100m backstroke	1:34.92	9	did not advance	
Rhiannon Oliver	S8	50m freestyle	35.25	12	did not advance	
Rhiannon Oliver	S8	100m freestyle	1:15.57	11	did not advance	
Rhiannon Oliver	SB7	100m breaststroke	—N/a		1:45.49	5
Esther Overton	S3	50m backstroke	1:12.49	4 Q	1:13.33	5
Esther Overton	S3	50m freestyle	1:11.99	6 Q	1:12.26	6
Katrina Porter	S7	100m backstroke	1:24.44 WR	1 Q	1:24.30 WR	1st place, gold medalist(s)
Katrina Porter	S7	50m butterfly	DSQ		did not advance	
Katrina Porter	S7	400m freestyle	5:43.88	5 Q	5:44.93	5
Katrina Porter	SB6	100m breaststroke	1:55.26	7 Q	1:55.08	7
Katrina Porter	SM7	200m individual medley	DSQ		did not advance	
Shelley Rogers	S7	100m backstroke	1:31.49	6 Q	1:30.26	5
Shelley Rogers	S7	50m butterfly	41.35	6 Q	40.02	6
Shelley Rogers	SM7	200m individual medley	3:17.34	3 Q	3:12.68	4
Sarah Rose	S6	50m freestyle	40.90	9	did not advance	
Sarah Rose	S6	50m butterfly	41.37	5 Q	40.95	4
Sarah Rose	S6	100m freestyle	1:30.31	10	did not advance	
Sarah Rose	SM6	200m individual medley	3:30.68	7 Q	3:29.54	7
Teigan van Roosmalen	S13	100m backstroke	1:16.26	9	did not advance	
Teigan van Roosmalen	S13	100m butterfly	1:10.57	6 Q	1:09.48	7
Teigan van Roosmalen	S13	50m freestyle	—N/a		30.51	8
Teigan van Roosmalen	S13	100m freestyle	1:07.64	9	did not advance	
Teigan van Roosmalen	S13	400m freestyle	4:58.20	8 Q	5:02.17	8
Teigan van Roosmalen	SM13	200m individual medley	—N/a		2:39.20	6
Prue Watt	S13	100m backstroke	1:15.65	8 Q	1:16.05	8
Prue Watt	S13	100m butterfly	1:08.21	4 Q	1:07.48	4
Prue Watt	S13	50m freestyle	—N/a		28.16	5
Prue Watt	S13	100m freestyle	1:02.61	6 Q	1:01.59	6
Prue Watt	S13	400m freestyle	4:49.80	5 Q	4:46.21	6
Prue Watt	SM13	200m individual medley	—N/a		2:32.87	5
Annabelle Williams	S9	100m butterfly	1:11.41	4 Q	1:10.98	3rd place, bronze medalist(s)
Annabelle Williams	S9	50m freestyle	29.76	3 Q	29.80	4
Annabelle Williams	S9	100m freestyle	1:05.71	7 Q	1:05.43	7

Coaches – Brendan Keogh (Head Coach), Graeme Carroll, Jackie Barck, Amanda Isaac, Jo Love, Rob Moon, Mel Tantrum

Officials – Melanie Jenkins (Section Manager), Jon O'Neill-Shaw, Sandra Eccles, Claire Nichols, Brendan Burkett, Sacha Fulton, Penny Will, Vaughan Nicholson

=== Table Tennis ===
Athlete	Event	Preliminaries				Round of 16	Quarterfinals	Semifinals	Final / BM	
Athlete	Event	Opposition Result	Opposition Result	Opposition Result	Rank	Opposition Result	Opposition Result	Opposition Result	Opposition Result	Rank
Rebecca Julian	Women's singles C6-7	van Zon (NED); L 2–3	Pitry (POL); L 0–3	—N/a	3	did not advance				
Sarah Lazzaro	Women's singles C9	Liu M (CHN); L 0-3	Grzelak (POL); L 0-3	Komleva (RUS); L 0-3	4	did not advance				
Rebecca Julian; Sarah Lazzaro	Women's team C6-10	No preliminaries				Ukraine (UKR); L 0-3	did not advance			

Coach – Brian Berry (Head Coach) Official – Barbara Talbot (Section Manager). Catherine Morrow was selected but withdrew from the team.

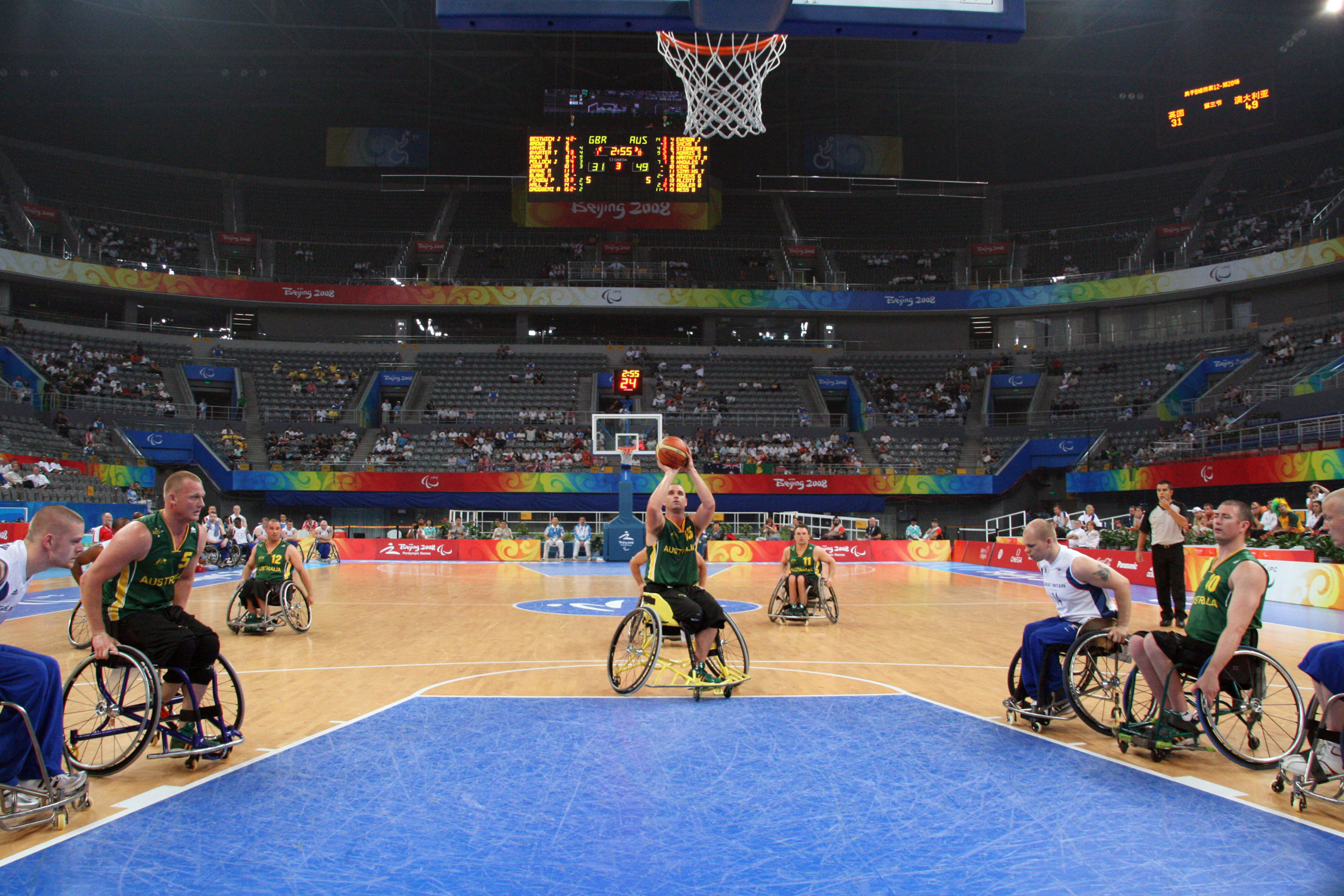
Brad Ness in the Australian Paralympic Men's Basketball Team making a free throw when playing against Great Britain.

=== Wheelchair Basketball ===
==== Men's tournament ====
Australian men's team known as the 'Rollers' won the gold medal defeating Canada 72–60 in the final

Team roster

Dylan Alcott, Brendan Dowler, Justin Eveson, Michael Hartnett, Adrian King, Tristan Knowles, Grant Mizens, Brad Ness, Shaun Norris, Troy Sachs, Tige Simmons, Brett Stibners
Coaches – Ben Ettridge (Head Coach), Craig Friday Officials – Kelvin Browner (section Manager), Ian Lowther

Group B Matches

7 September 2008
16:15

Australia	73–72	Brazil

National Indoor Stadium, Beijing

8 September 2008
20:45

Great Britain	48–67	Australia

National Indoor Stadium, Beijing

9 September 2008
11:30

Australia	79–44	China

National Indoor Stadium, Beijing

10 September 2008
15:30

Australia	66–59	Israel

USTB Gymnasium, Beijing

11 September 2008
20:45

United States	68–61	Australia
Scoring by quarter: 24-20, 18-16, 9-21, 17-4

National Indoor Stadium, Beijing
Attendance: 9780
Referees: Juan Manuel Urunuela (ESP)

Group B Standings

Team	Pld	W	L	PF	PA	PD	Pts
Australia (Q)	5	4	1	346	291	+55	9
United States (Q)	5	4	1	378	247	+131	9
Great Britain (Q)	5	4	1	334	271	+63	9
Israel (Q)	5	2	3	332	325	+7	7
Brazil	5	1	4	291	348	−57	6
China	5	0	5	203	402	−199	5

Source: Paralympic.org
(Q) Qualified for quarterfinals

Quarter finals

13 September 2008
13:30

Australia	72–52	Japan
Scoring by quarter: 21-15, 17-15, 19-13, 15-9
Pts: Brad Ness 18; Rebs: Brad Ness 14; Asts: Shaun Norris 4		Pts: Kazuyuki Kyoya, Tetsuya Miyajima 9 Rebs: Akimasa Suzuki, Shingo Fujii 6 Asts: Hiroaki Kozai 3

National Indoor Stadium, Beijing
Attendance: 12000
Referees: Edwin Frank Wallaart (NED)

Semi finals

14 September 2008
19:00

Great Britain	54–67	Australia
Scoring by quarter: 6-19, 14-17, 13-18, 21-13
Pts: Jon Pollock 18; Rebs: Simon Munn 11; Asts: Jon Pollock 3		Pts: Justin Eveson 22; Rebs: Brad Ness 11; Asts: Justin Eveson 2

National Indoor Stadium, Beijing
Attendance: 12000
Referees: Juan Manuel Urunuela (ESP)

Gold medal game

16 September 2008
19:30

Canada	60–72	Australia
Scoring by quarter: 17-16, 15-12, 15-26, 13-18
Pts: Patrick Anderson 22; Rebs: Patrick Anderson, Joey Johnson 12; Asts: Patrick Anderson 6		Pts: Troy Sachs 19; Rebs: Troy Sachs, Justin Eveson 7 Asts: Brad Ness 8

National Indoor Stadium, Beijing
Attendance: 12000
Referees: Edwin Frank Wallaart (NED)

==== Women's tournament ====
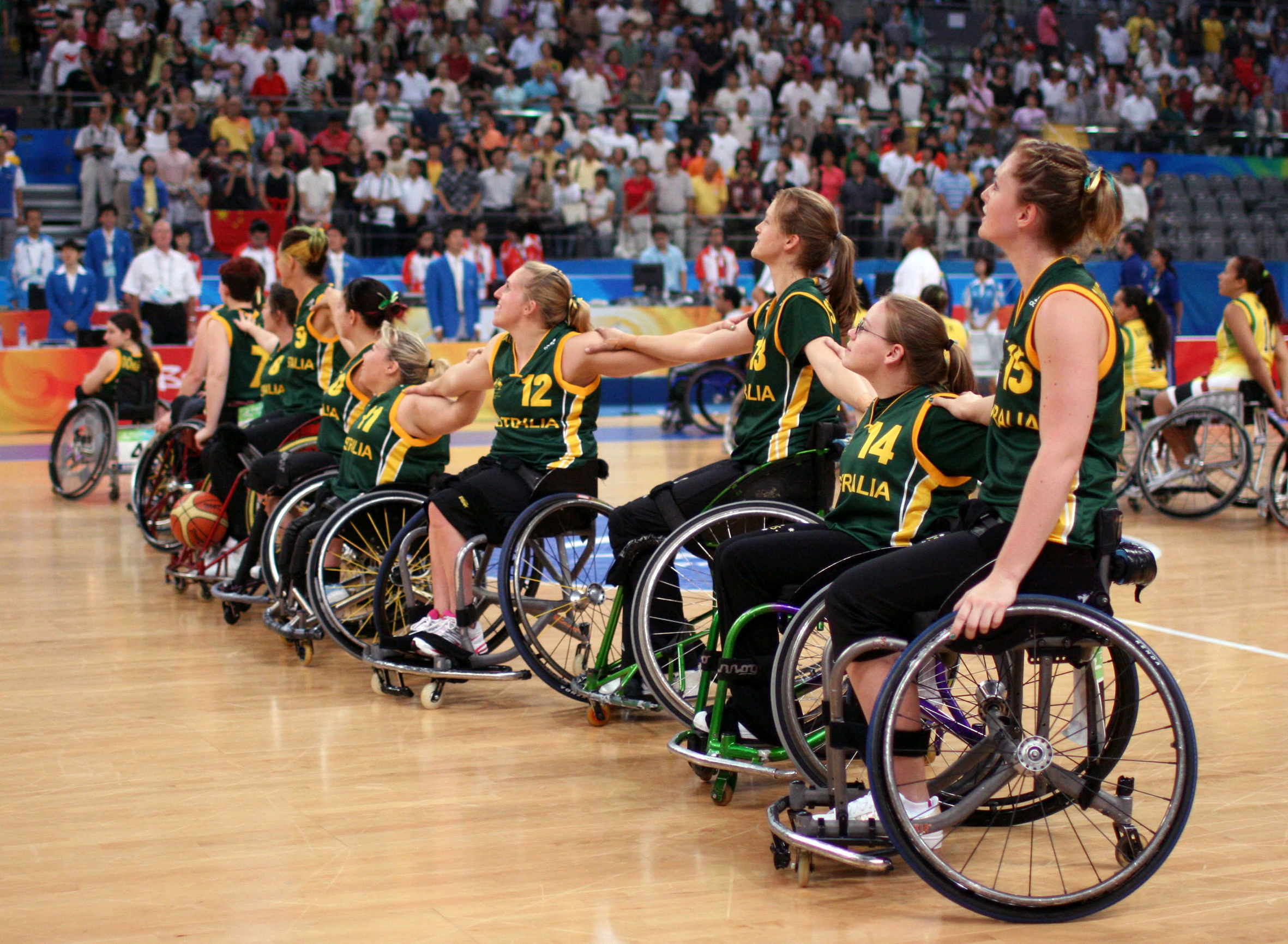
The Gliders lining up for the national anthem.

The women's team known as the 'Gliders' won the bronze medal defeating Japan in the playoff.

Team roster

Clare Burzynski, Shelley Chaplin, Cobi Crispin, Melanie Domaschenz, Kylie Gauci, Melanie Hall, Katie Hill, Bridie Kean, Tina McKenzie, Kathleen O'Kelly-Kennedy, Sarah Stewart, Liesl Tesch

Coaches – Gerry Hewson (Head Coach), Mark Hewish

Officials – Sonia Healy (Section Manager), Emma Whiteside.

Group A Standings'

7 September 2008
10:00

Australia	59–30	Great Britain
Scoring by quarter: 24-2, 6-11, 18-4, 11-13
Pts: Cobi Crispin 16; Rebs: Cobi Crispin 8 Asts: Liesl Tesch 4		Pts: Sally Wager, Clare Strange 5 Rebs: Helen Freeman 7 Asts: Helen Freeman, Clare Strange 3

USTB Gymnasium, Beijing
Attendance: 2140
Referees: Bill Kuerzi (USA)

8 September 2008
13:30

Brazil	30–66	Australia

National Indoor Stadium, Beijing

9 September 2008
15:30

Australia	42–61	United States

USTB Gymnasium, Beijing

10 September 2008
18:30

Germany	64–56	Australia

National Indoor Stadium, Beijing

Group A Table

Pos	Team	Pld	W	L	PF	PA	PD	Pts
1	United States (Q)	4	4	0	227	149	+78	8
2	Germany (Q)	4	3	1	214	174	+40	7
3	Australia (Q)	4	2	2	223	185	+38	6
4	Great Britain (Q)	4	1	3	166	194	−28	5
5	Brazil	4	0	4	129	257	−128	4

Source: Paralympic.org
(Q) Qualified for quarterfinals

Quarter-finals

12 September 2008
21:15

Canada	49–53	Australia
Scoring by quarter: 10-14, 17-14, 10-12, 12-13

National Indoor Stadium, Beijing
Attendance: 12215
Referees: Juan Manuel Urunuela (ESP)

Semi-finals

13 September 2008
19:00

United States	60–47	Australia
Scoring by quarter: 12-15, 12-7, 14-18, 22-7

National Indoor Stadium, Beijing
Attendance: 12000
Referees: Andre Bosveld (NED)

Bronze medal game

15 September 2008
19:00

Australia	53–47	Japan
Scoring by quarter: 17-10, 14-13, 12-13, 10-11

National Indoor Stadium, Beijing
Attendance: 12000
Referees: Rui David Marques (BRA)

=== Wheelchair Rugby ===
Representing Australia in wheelchair rugby:
Men – Bryce Alman, Ryley Batt, Grant Boxall, Shane Brand, Cameron Carr, Nazim Erdem, George Hucks, Steve Porter, Ryan Scott, Greg Smith, Scott Vitale Coach – Brad Dubberley (Head Coach) Officials – Kim Ellwood (Section Manager), Rob Doidge, Noni Shelton, Angela Mansell

Three of the team made their Paralympic debut and Steve Porter attended his fourth Games. The Australian team known as the 'Steelers' won the silver medal losing to the United States 53–44 in the final.

Group B Standing and Results

Group B
Rank	Team	Pld	W	L	PF:PA	Pts	AUS	GBR	NZL	GER
1	Australia (AUS)	3	3	0	129:111	6	x	43:37	39:38	47:36
2	Great Britain (GBR)	3	2	1	115:116	5	37:43	x	39:38	39:35
3	New Zealand (NZL)	3	1	2	116:109	4	38:39	38:39	x	40:31
4	Germany (GER)	3	0	3	102:126	3	36:47	35:39	31:40	x

Qualified for quarterfinals
Eliminated

Source: Paralympic.org

=== Medal round ===
Semifinals
15 September 2008 - 18:00
United States	35
Great Britain	32
15 September 2008 - 20:00
Australia	41
Canada	40

Gold medal match
16 September 2008 - 20:00
United States	53
Australia	44
Bronze medal match
16 September 2008 - 18:00
Great Britain	41
Canada	47

Source: Paralympic.org

=== Wheelchair Tennis ===
==== Men ====
Athlete	Class	Event	Round of 64	Round of 32	Round of 16	Quarterfinals	Semifinals	Finals
Athlete	Class	Event	Opposition Result	Opposition Result	Opposition Result	Opposition Result	Opposition Result	Opposition Result
Michael Dobbie	Open	Men's singles	Schmaeh (SUI); W 6–3, 6-4	Wikstrom (SWE); L 1–6, 3-6	did not advance			
Ben Weekes	Open	Men's singles	Fujimoto (JPN); L 5–7, 4–6	did not advance				
Michael Dobbie; Ben Weekes	Open	Men's doubles	—N/a	Legner (AUT); Mossier (AUT); L 4–6, 1-6	did not advance			

==== Women ====
Athlete	Class	Event	Round of 32	Round of 16	Quarterfinals	Semifinals	Finals
Athlete	Class	Event	Opposition Result	Opposition Result	Opposition Result	Opposition Result	Opposition Result
Daniela di Toro	Open	Women's singles	Vergeer (NED); L 2–6, 0–6	did not advance			

Coach – Greg Crump (Head Coach) Officials – Geoff Quinlan (Section Manager)

== Venues ==
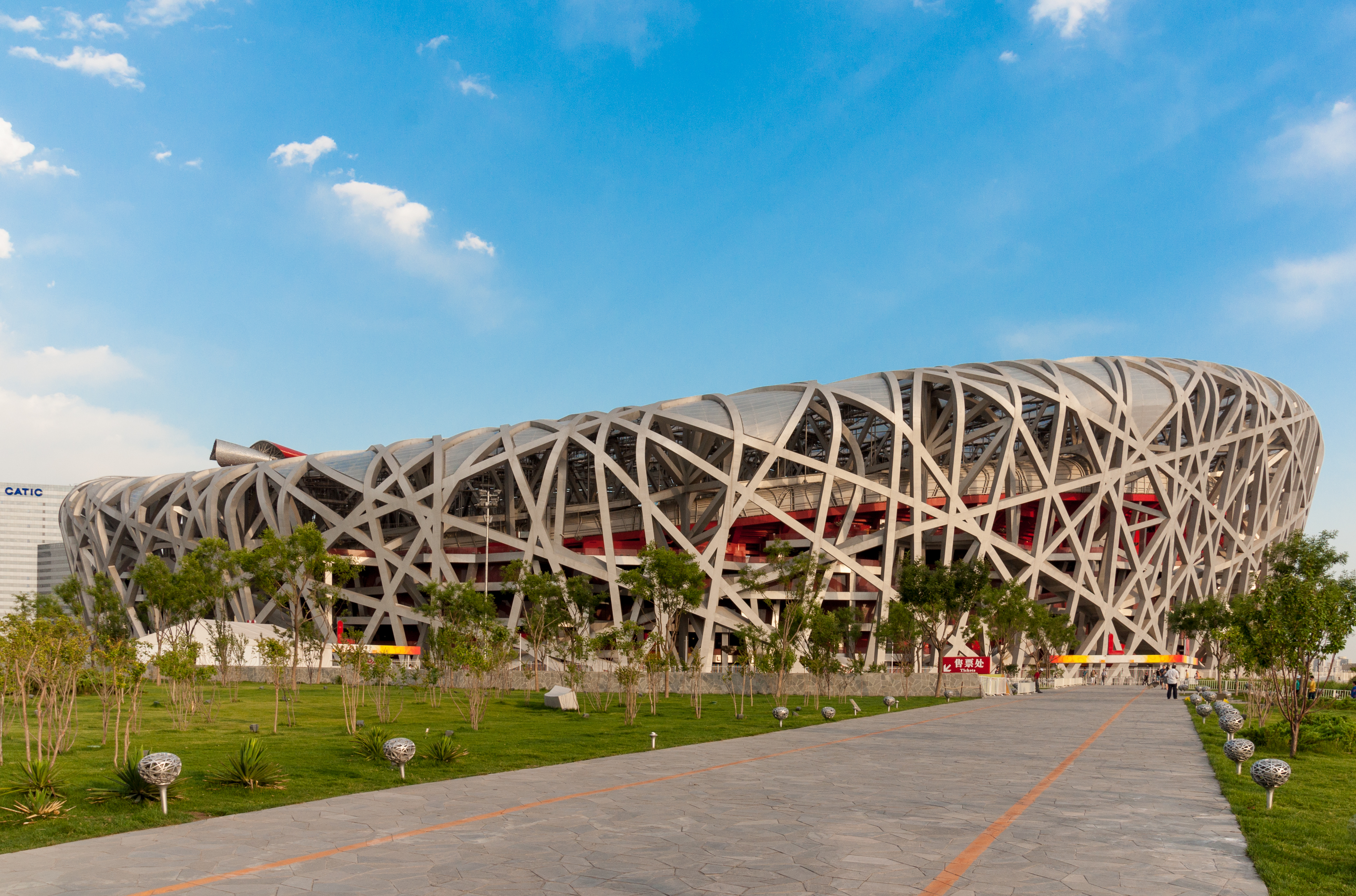
Beijing National Stadium "Birds Nest"

There were 19 venues for the Paralympics in Beijing. From this, 18 were used at the Olympics and also in the Paralympic games. Venues were spread throughout three regions in China. “In the construction of the Olympic venues and related facilities, we will give full consideration to the special needs of the athletes and spectators with physical disabilities, to materialize the goal of "equality, participation and sharing"”. When constructing venues for both the Olympic and Paralympic, impediment free designs had to be used to enable access by able and disabled bodies.

Facilities where Australians competed include the Beijing National Stadium (Birds Nest), Beijing National Aquatics Centre (Water Cube), Beijing National Indoor Stadium (Fan) as well as many more.

=== Venues Designed by Australian Companies ===
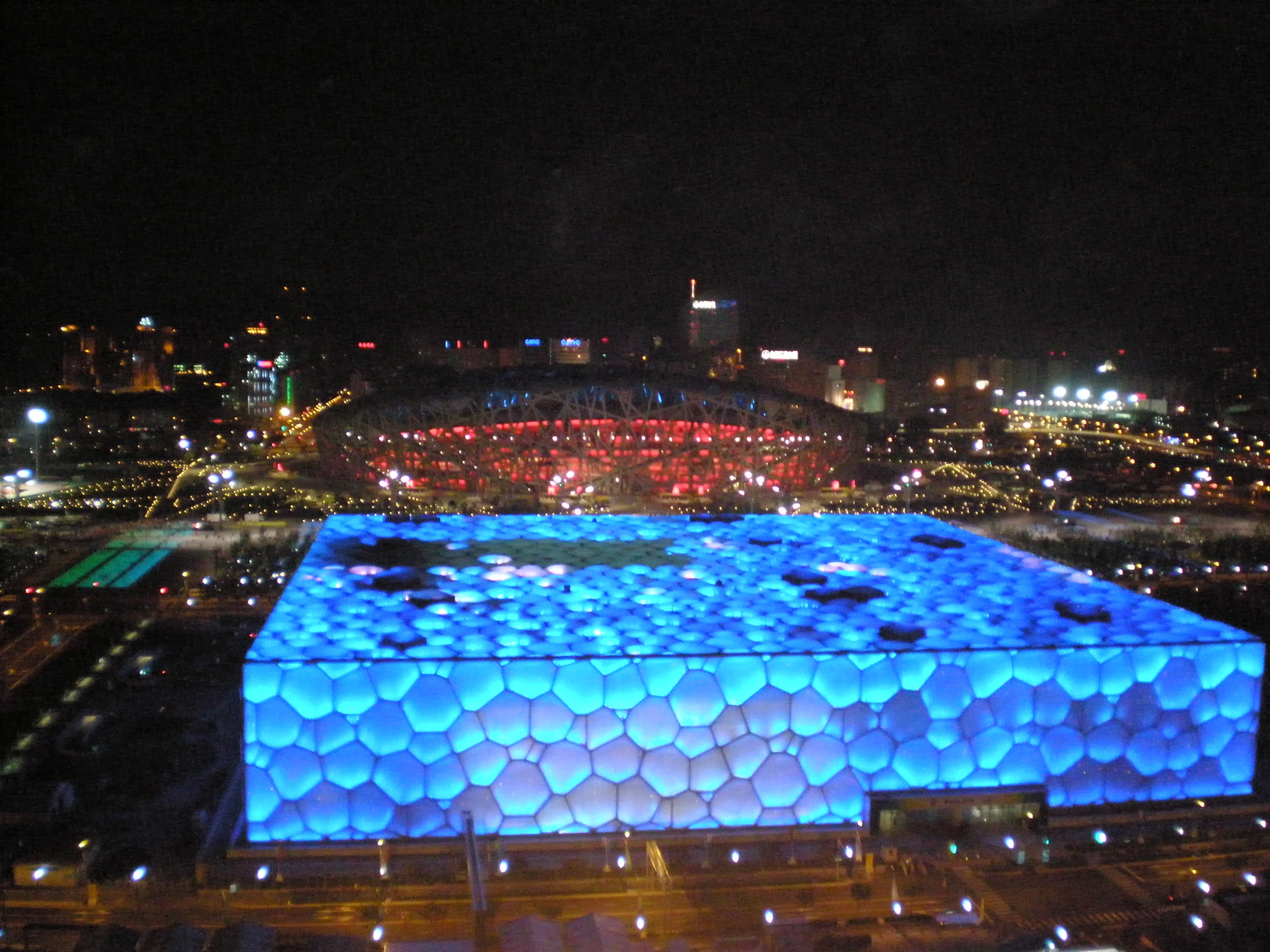
The Beijing National Stadium (Birds Nest and the Beijing National Aquatics Centre (The Water Cube),

Many of the venues were designed by Australian companies. One of the iconic venues ‘The Water Cube’, was designed by Australian companies PTW Architects, ARUP Aust., Anti Wave International CSCEC. Other facilities used by for the Paralympics included the Archery, Hockey and Tennis venues which were all designed by Bligh Voller Nield. Many other Australian companies also contributed to the design and building of facilities.

== Administration ==
Athletes and coaches were supported by administrative and sports medicine and science staff. Administrative staff – Darren Peters (Chef de Mission), Nick Dean (Deputy Chef de Mission), Paul Bird (Chef de Mission), Alison Keys, Jason Hellwig (General Manager), Steve Loader, Michael Hartung, Natalie Jenkins, Caroline Walker, Chris Nunn (Performance Consultant), Jenni Cole, Tony Naar (Chief Information Manager), Graham Cassidy (Media Manager), Margie McDonald, Jordan Baker, Karen Michelmore
Sports medicine and science staff – Larissa Trease, Alison Campbell (Medical Coordinator), Geoff Thompson, Ruben Branson, Sally Heads, John Camens, David Spurrier, Lily Chiu, Richard Bennett, Gary Slater, Jo Vaile

== Sponsorship ==
“Australia's Paralympic team is funded by the Federal Government but also relies heavily on donations and corporate sponsorship”. The growth of Paralympic sports has grown phenomenally in the past decade however there was concern this didn't translate into increased corporate sponsorship, especially before the 2008 games. Despite this, the Australian Paralympic Committee outlined in their Annual Report for 2007/08 that their corporate sponsorship revenue increased. The revenue for corporate sponsorship was $1.47 million for the year, resulting in a 17.7 per cent increase from the previous year.

=== Major sponsors ===
Telstra was one of many major sponsors at the Beijing Games. Throughout the games, the Australia Paralympic Committee and Telstra created the Telstra HeroMessage program. The program generated 7,000 messages of support that were sent to athletes at the games. The program also ran Chat to a Champ. It allowed students from the Telstra Paralympic Education Program to talk to their Paralympic heroes at the games via the internet.

Toyota was another sponsor for the Paralympic team in Beijing. Toyota has been supporting the APC for over 12 years (at the time) and through this has been building awareness of the Paralympic movement. They ran multiple promotions in the lead up to the 2008 games. This included developing a media campaign with News Limited and also adding information on Paralympic Games/Athletes to their website.

=== Beijing Sponsors and Supporters Program (BSSP) ===
Representatives from the 25 key sponsors and supporters were sent to Beijing as a part of the BSSP Program. This experience enabled them to see 7 days of the games and witness sports such as swimming cycling, basketball, wheelchair tennis, wheelchair basketball and many more. They also had the chance to tour the Paralympic village, meet the athletes and staff and have an official greeting at the Australian Embassy. “The BSSP enables sponsors and key supporters to experience the Games firsthand and to see the impact of their support on Australia’s Paralympic athletes”.

== Toyota Paralympic Talent Search Program ==
The Australian Paralympic Committee (APC) runs the Toyota Paralympic Talent Search Program. "Its main goal is to identify people with physical disabilities, vision impairments or intellectual disabilities who display the athletic potential to one day make it to Paralympic level competition". There were 53 athletes from the program who became a part of the Paralympic Preparation Program leading up to the games. From this pool of athletes, 27 where chosen to represent Australia in the 2008 Beijing Paralympic Team. By the end of the games, 15 of those who were selected to be in the team from the Talent Program won medals at their first Paralympic games.

== Fundraising ==
Since 1990 the Australian Paralympic Committee has been responsible for preparing the Summer and Winter Teams for the Paralympic Games. They also assist athletes to prepare by, "…providing funding for coaching, equipment and travel in the lead up to the…Paralympic Games". Fundraising is an essential avenue for the APC to provide funding for the team. Through various fundraising activities in the lead up to the 2008 games, a $3.11 million gross revenue was made from the 1 October 2007 to the 30 September 2008. This figure beat the target that was set. Revenue of $2.26 million was earned through activities such as raffles, lottery draws and promotional sales. Allsports Direct Australia is a contracted raffle trader and contributed to helping the APC earn the amount fundraised.The APC acknowledges the support from their individual and corporate donors. Almost $850,000 (from the 2007-2008 financial year) from individual and corporate donors went directly to the Beijing Paralympic Team.

== Media coverage ==
Because Australia was sending their largest Paralympic team to the 2008 games, they wanted to make sure that their efforts would be broadcast to Australians. This included putting in place many initiatives to publish, broadcast and promote the games and Paralympic achievements. In order to distribute content they worked with the Australian Associated Press (AAP), “to maximise distribution of key stories, developing relationships with editors and key journalists, developing a program of events and activities and providing quality background information and stories”. Media Monitors, established there was a total of 31,986 Australian media stories distributed throughout the 2008 Paralympic Games. Online traffic on the APC's website throughout the Beijing Games increased more than 500 percent over Athens and media coverage. The Australian Paralympic Committee reported that there was a 65 per cent increase in Australian media coverage of the Games compared to the 2004 Games in Athens. Independent research has also indicated that 64 percent of Australians followed the Beijing Paralympics, which indicates that APC's goal to broadcast the games to Australians over multiple platforms was achieved.

The 2008 Paralympic Games also had television coverage by the Australian Broadcasting Corporation (ABC). The ABC produced the largest, “coverage by an Australian broadcaster in the Paralympic Games history”. There was 40 crew that traveled to Beijing so that the ABC was able to produce more there 120 hours of coverage, including 100 hours which were broadcast live. It also included daily segments which showed highlights from the games and Australian athlete. The highlights shown at 6pm where, "...pulling in an average audience of over 400,000 viewers". The coverage of the games was shown over six platforms including television, online and radio. The ABC were, “…awarded Paralympic broadcaster of the year for the Beijing 2008 Paralympic Games”. Australian athlete Gerrard Gosens commented on the television coverage "When I look back to 1996 and the coverage that was there, it was very minimal. Today when you're looking at over 100 hours of ABC television coverage, that really has brought inspiration not only to many Australians, but in particular people who do have a physical disability and looking at the opportunities, not necessarily the obstacles of sport.

=== Female media coverage ===
Inconsistent media coverage between males and females has always been an issue in sport, even in coverage at the Paralympic Games.“In 2007, the Australian government made a pre-election commitment to provide A$1 million to the APC towards the coverage of the 2008 summer and 2010 winter Paralympic Games for the purpose of promoting female participation and role models”. A study conducted for the APC found that the 2008 Beijing Paralympic Games, “…coverage of women at the Games in Australian media was broadly in line with their proportion of the Australian Team (45%) and their total medal success at the Games (37%)”. Women's sport coverage exceeded the media's normal 2 percent allocation of females sport coverage.

== See also ==
- Australia at the Paralympics
- Australia at the 2008 Summer Olympics
