= Equestrian at the 2008 Summer Paralympics – Individual freestyle test grade Ib =

Individual Freestyle Test Grade Ib at the XIII Paralympic Games
- Paralympic Equestrian
- Venue: Hong Kong Olympic Equestrian Centre
- Dates: 11 September 2008
- Competitors: 15 from 11 nations

Medalists
1st place, gold medalist(s)		Lee Pearson	Great Britain
2nd place, silver medalist(s)		Ricky Balshaw	Great Britain
3rd place, bronze medalist(s)		Marcos Alves	Brazil

The Equestrian Individual Freestyle Test Grade Ib event at the 2008 Summer Paralympics was held in the Hong Kong Olympic Equestrian Centre on 11 September.

The competition was assessed by a ground jury composed of five judges placed at locations designated E, H, C, M, and B. Each judge rated the competitors' performances with scores out of 10 for technical difficulty and artistic merit. The ten scores from the jury were then summed to determine a rider's total percentage score.

The event was won by Lee Pearson, representing Great Britain.

== Ground jury ==
Judge at E	Liliana Iannone ( Argentina)
Judge at H	Janet Geary ( Australia)
Judge at C	Gudrun Hofinga ( Germany), jury president
Judge at M	Tarja Huttunen ( Finland)
Judge at B	Hanneke Gerritsen ( Netherlands)

== Results ==
Rank	Rider	Horse		Score (and rank)					Tech/Art Score (Rk)	Total % score
Rank	Rider	Horse		E	H	C	M	B	Tech/Art Score (Rk)	Total % score
1st place, gold medalist(s)	Lee Pearson (GBR)	Gentlemen	Tech:	7.222 (1)	7.889 (1)	7.556 (1)	7.556 (1)	7.556 (1)	37.779 (1)	77.057
1st place, gold medalist(s)	Lee Pearson (GBR)	Gentlemen	Art:	7.722 (1)	8.000 (1)	8.056 (1)	7.778 (1)	7.722 (1)	39.278 (1)	77.057
2nd place, silver medalist(s)	Ricky Balshaw (GBR)	Deacons Giorgi	Tech:	7.111 (2)	7.000 (2)	6.778 (2)	7.000 (2)	7.000 (2)	34.889 (2)	70.444
2nd place, silver medalist(s)	Ricky Balshaw (GBR)	Deacons Giorgi	Art:	6.944 (3)	7.000 (2)	6.944 (2)	7.389 (2)	7.278 (2)	35.555 (2)	70.444
3rd place, bronze medalist(s)	Marcos Alves (BRA)	Luthenay De Vernay	Tech:	6.778 (3)	6.222 (8)	6.444 (4)	6.889 (3)	6.667 (5)	33.000 (3)	67.333
3rd place, bronze medalist(s)	Marcos Alves (BRA)	Luthenay De Vernay	Art:	7.000 (2)	6.500 (9)	6.833 (3)	7.222 (3)	6.778 (6)	34.333 (3)	67.333
4	Nicole Kullen (AUS)	Nomination	Tech:	6.111 (7)	6.333 (7)	6.333 (7)	6.444 (4)	6.778 (4)	31.999 (4)	66.110
4	Nicole Kullen (AUS)	Nomination	Art:	6.722 (5)	6.611 (7)	6.667 (7)	7.111 (4)	7.000 (3)	34.111 (4)	66.110
5	Jens Dokkan (NOR)	Lacour	Tech:	6.444 (4)	6.667 (4)	6.333 (7)	6.111 (10)	6.000 (10)	31.555 (6)	65.555
5	Jens Dokkan (NOR)	Lacour	Art:	6.889 (4)	6.889 (3)	6.611 (8)	6.778 (7)	6.833 (5)	34.000 (5)	65.555
6	Jose Lorquet (BEL)	Junior Du Pre	Tech:	6.222 (6)	6.556 (5)	6.222 (10)	6.222 (8)	6.222 (7)	31.444 (7)	65.333
6	Jose Lorquet (BEL)	Junior Du Pre	Art:	6.667 (6)	6.833 (4)	6.778 (5)	6.722 (8)	6.889 (4)	33.889 (6)	65.333
7	Katja Karjalainen (FIN)	Callan	Tech:	6.333 (5)	6.111 (9)	6.667 (3)	6.333 (5)	6.222 (7)	31.666 (5)	64.999
7	Katja Karjalainen (FIN)	Callan	Art:	6.444 (10)	6.667 (6)	6.500 (9)	7.111 (4)	6.611 (9)	33.333 (7)	64.999
8	Ashley Gowanlock (CAN)	Donnymaskell	Tech:	5.889 (10)	6.111 (9)	6.444 (4)	6.333 (5)	6.333 (6)	31.110 (9)	64.221
8	Ashley Gowanlock (CAN)	Donnymaskell	Art:	6.556 (9)	6.500 (9)	6.833 (3)	7.000 (6)	6.222 (12)	33.111 (8)	64.221
9	Lynn Seidemann (USA)	Rhett	Tech:	6.000 (8)	7.000 (2)	6.444 (4)	5.889 (13)	5.889 (13)	31.222 (8)	64.221
9	Lynn Seidemann (USA)	Rhett	Art:	6.611 (8)	6.833 (4)	6.722 (6)	6.500 (11)	6.333 (11)	32.999 (9)	64.221
10	Marion Milne (RSA)	Waldfee 697	Tech:	5.778 (12)	6.111 (9)	6.333 (7)	6.222 (8)	6.222 (7)	30.666 (11)	62.333
10	Marion Milne (RSA)	Waldfee 697	Art:	5.889 (12)	6.333 (11)	6.111 (14)	6.556 (10)	6.778 (6)	31.667 (11)	62.333
11	Celine Gerny (FRA)	Jeudi D'Avril	Tech:	5.667 (13)	6.111 (9)	6.111 (11)	6.000 (11)	6.889 (3)	30.778 (10)	61.666
11	Celine Gerny (FRA)	Jeudi D'Avril	Art:	5.611 (14)	6.167 (13)	6.444 (11)	5.944 (13)	6.722 (8)	30.888 (14)	61.666
12	Grace Bowman (AUS)	Yv Mt Batton	Tech:	6.000 (8)	6.556 (5)	6.111 (11)	5.778 (14)	6.000 (10)	30.445 (12)	61.611
12	Grace Bowman (AUS)	Yv Mt Batton	Art:	5.889 (12)	6.611 (7)	6.444 (11)	5.833 (14)	6.389 (10)	31.166 (12)	61.611
13	Omer Ben Dor (ISR)	Lennox	Tech:	5.889 (10)	5.556 (14)	5.889 (14)	6.333 (5)	5.889 (13)	29.556 (14)	61.501
13	Omer Ben Dor (ISR)	Lennox	Art:	6.667 (6)	6.000 (15)	6.500 (9)	6.722 (8)	6.056 (14)	31.945 (10)	61.501
14	Keith Newerla (USA)	Walk On The Moon	Tech:	5.556 (14)	5.889 (13)	6.111 (11)	6.000 (11)	6.000 (10)	29.556 (13)	60.500
14	Keith Newerla (USA)	Walk On The Moon	Art:	6.056 (11)	6.111 (14)	6.333 (13)	6.222 (12)	6.222 (12)	30.944 (13)	60.500
15	Davi Mesquita (BRA)	Neho De La Jonchere	Tech:	5.000 (15)	5.222 (15)	5.111 (15)	5.222 (15)	5.000 (15)	25.555 (15)	54.444
15	Davi Mesquita (BRA)	Neho De La Jonchere	Art:	5.222 (15)	6.278 (12)	5.722 (15)	5.667 (15)	6.000 (15)	28.889 (15)	54.444
