= Equestrian at the 2008 Summer Paralympics – Individual championship test grade Ib =

Individual Championship Test Grade Ib at the XIII Paralympic Games
- Paralympic Equestrian
- Venue: Hong Kong Olympic Equestrian Centre
- Dates: 9 September 2008
- Competitors: 15 from 11 nations

Medalists
| 1st place, gold medalist(s) | | Lee Pearson | Great Britain |
| 2nd place, silver medalist(s) | | Jens Dokkan | Norway |
| 3rd place, bronze medalist(s) | | Marcos Alves | Brazil |

The Equestrian Individual Championship Test Grade Ib event at the 2008 Summer Paralympics was held in the Hong Kong Olympic Equestrian Centre on 9 September at 20:50.

The competition was assessed by a ground jury composed of five judges placed at locations designated E, H, C, M, and B. Each judge rated the competitors' performances with a percentage score. The five scores from the jury were then averaged to determine a rider's total percentage score.

The event was won by Lee Pearson, representing Great Britain.

== Ground jury ==
| Judge at E | Hanneke Gerritsen ( Netherlands) |
| Judge at H | Anne Prain ( France) |
| Judge at C | Kjell Myhre ( Norway), jury president |
| Judge at M | Alison Mastin ( Ireland) |
| Judge at B | Liliana Iannone ( Argentina) |

== Results ==
T = Team Member (see Equestrian at the 2008 Summer Paralympics – Team).

| Rank | Rider | Horse | Percentage score (and rank) | | | | | Total % score | Note |
| Rank | Rider | Horse | E | H | C | M | B | Total % score | Note |
|---|---|---|---|---|---|---|---|---|---|
| 1st place, gold medalist(s) | Lee Pearson (GBR) | Gentlemen | 71.905 (1) | 76.667 (1) | 74.762 (1) | 70.000 (2) | 72.857 (1) | 73.238 | T |
| 2nd place, silver medalist(s) | Jens Dokkan (NOR) | Lacour | 67.619 (2) | 69.524 (2) | 70.952 (2) | 69.524 (3) | 66.667 (2) | 68.857 | T |
| 3rd place, bronze medalist(s) | Marcos Alves (BRA) | Luthenay De Vernay | 65.714 (4) | 68.095 (3) | 67.143 (3) | 73.810 (1) | 63.810 (5) | 67.714 | T |
| 4 | Katja Karjalainen (FIN) | Callan | 63.333 (6) | 67.619 (4) | 66.667 (4) | 66.190 (6) | 64.762 (3) | 65.714 | |
| 5 | Ricky Balshaw (GBR) | Deacons Giorgi | 66.667 (3) | 63.810 (8) | 62.857 (10) | 66.667 (5) | 64.762 (3) | 64.953 | |
| 6 | Lynn Seidemann (USA) | Rhett | 62.381 (8) | 60.952 (10) | 64.762 (6) | 68.095 (4) | 63.333 (6) | 63.905 | T |
| 7 | Ashley Gowanlock (CAN) | Donnymaskell | 60.952 (9) | 64.762 (5) | 64.762 (6) | 64.762 (7) | 63.333 (6) | 63.714 | T |
| 8 | Jose Lorquet (BEL) | Junior Du Pre | 63.810 (5) | 64.286 (6) | 64.286 (8) | 63.810 (8) | 61.905 (8) | 63.619 | |
| 9 | Omer Ben Dor (ISR) | Lennox | 63.333 (6) | 64.286 (6) | 64.286 (8) | 62.381 (10) | 60.952 (9) | 63.048 | |
| 10 | Celine Gerny (FRA) | Jeudi D'Avril | 60.952 (9) | 63.333 (9) | 65.714 (5) | 60.476 (11) | 57.143 (12) | 61.524 | |
| 11 | Nicole Kullen (AUS) | Nomination | 56.667 (12) | 57.619 (13) | 62.381 (11) | 62.857 (9) | 60.000 (10) | 59.905 | T |
| 12 | Keith Newerla (USA) | Walk On The Moon | 57.619 (11) | 57.143 (14) | 61.905 (12) | 60.476 (11) | 55.714 (14) | 58.571 | |
| 13 | Marion Milne (RSA) | Waldfee 697 | 55.714 (13) | 59.048 (11) | 57.143 (14) | 59.048 (13) | 59.524 (11) | 58.095 | T |
| 14 | Davi Mesquita (BRA) | Neho De La Jonchere | 55.714 (13) | 59.048 (11) | 58.095 (13) | 55.238 (15) | 56.667 (13) | 56.952 | T |
| 15 | Grace Bowman (AUS) | Yv Mt Batton | 55.238 (15) | 55.714 (15) | 56.667 (15) | 58.571 (14) | 55.238 (15) | 56.286 | T |
