= Swimming at the 2008 Summer Paralympics – Men's 100 metre butterfly S8 =

Men's 100 metre butterfly S8 at the XIII Paralympic Games
- Venue: Beijing National Aquatics Center
- Dates: September 7
- Competitors: 14 from 9 nations

Medalists
| 1st place, gold medalist(s) | | Peter Leek | Australia |
| 2nd place, silver medalist(s) | | Wei Yanpeng | China |
| 3rd place, bronze medalist(s) | | Wang Xiaofu | China |

The men's 100 metre butterfly S8 event at the 2008 Paralympic Games took place on September 7, at the Beijing National Aquatics Center.

Two heats were held, with seven swimmers in each heat. The swimmers with the eight fastest times advanced to the final; there, they all competed in a single final heat to earn final placements.

== Heats ==
=== Heat 1 ===
| Rank | Lane | Name | Nationality | Time | Notes |
|---|---|---|---|---|---|
| 1 | 4 | Peter Leek | Australia | 1:01.01 | Q |
| 2 | 5 | Wang Jianchiao | China | 1:03.27 | Q |
| 3 | 6 | Mikhail Sidnin | Russia | 1:08.47 | |
| 4 | 3 | Konstantin Lisenkov | Russia | 1:09.66 | |
| 5 | 7 | Alejandro Sánchez | Spain | 1:10.18 | |
| 6 | 1 | Rudy Garcia Tolson | United States | 1:12.99 | |
| 7 | 2 | Nikolai Willig | Germany | 1:13.39 | |

=== Heat 2 ===
| Rank | Lane | Name | Nationality | Time | Notes |
|---|---|---|---|---|---|
| 1 | 3 | Wei Yanpeng | China | 1:01.76 | Q |
| 2 | 4 | Wang Xiaofu | China | 1:03.25 | Q |
| 3 | 5 | Ben Austin | Australia | 1:04.83 | Q |
| 4 | 7 | Drew Christensen | Canada | 1:06.98 | Q |
| 5 | 6 | Sean Fraser | Great Britain | 1:07.42 | Q |
| 6 | 2 | Ferenc Csuri | Hungary | 1:07.96 | Q |
| 7 | 1 | Evgeny Zimin | Russia | 1:13.50 | |

== Final ==
| Rank | Lane | Name | Nationality | Time | Notes |
|---|---|---|---|---|---|
| 1 | 4 | Peter Leek | Australia | 1:00.95 | |
| 2 | 5 | Wei Yanpeng | China | 1:01.49 | |
| 3 | 3 | Wang Xiaofu | China | 1:01.68 | |
| 4 | 6 | Wang Jiachao | China | 1:03.01 | |
| 5 | 2 | Ben Austin | Australia | 1:03.50 | |
| 6 | 7 | Drew Christensen | Canada | 1:07.74 | |
| 7 | 8 | Ferenc Csuri | Hungary | 1:08.17 | |
| 8 | 1 | Sean Fraser | Great Britain | 1:08.36 | |
