= Swimming at the 2008 Summer Paralympics – Men's 400 metre freestyle S8 =

Men's 400m Freestyle S8 at the XIII Paralympic Games
- Venue: Beijing National Aquatics Center
- Dates: 12 September
- Competitors: 11 from 7 nations
- Winning time: 4:26.25

Medalists
| 1st place, gold medalist(s) | | Sam Hynd | Great Britain |
| 2nd place, silver medalist(s) | | Peter Leek | Australia |
| 3rd place, bronze medalist(s) | | Wang Jiachao | China |

The men's 400m freestyle S8 event at the 2008 Summer Paralympics took place at the Beijing National Aquatics Center on 12 September. There were two heats; the swimmers with the eight fastest times advanced to the final.

== Results ==
=== Heats ===
Competed from 09:00.

==== Heat 1 ====
| Rank | Name | Nationality | Time | Notes |
|---|---|---|---|---|
| 1 | Peter Leek | Australia | 4:35.87 | Q, PR |
| 2 | Nikolai Willig | Germany | 4:49.25 | Q |
| 3 | Matt Levy | Australia | 4:50.78 | Q |
| 4 | Wang Xiaofu | China | 5:01.05 | Q |
| 5 | Drew Christensen | Canada | 5:18.13 | |

==== Heat 2 ====
| Rank | Name | Nationality | Time | Notes |
|---|---|---|---|---|
| 1 | Sam Hynd | Great Britain | 4:26.46 | Q, WR |
| 2 | Wang Jiachao | China | 4:43.75 | Q |
| 3 | Christoph Burkard | Germany | 4:45.97 | Q |
| 4 | Rudy Garcia Tolson | United States | 5:02.17 | Q |
| 5 | Tom Miazga | United States | 5:14.26 | |
| 6 | Yann Nouard | France | 5:16.01 | |

=== Final ===
Competed at 17:00.

| Rank | Name | Nationality | Time | Notes |
|---|---|---|---|---|
| 1st place, gold medalist(s) | Sam Hynd | Great Britain | 4:26.25 | WR |
| 2nd place, silver medalist(s) | Peter Leek | Australia | 4:31.16 | |
| 3rd place, bronze medalist(s) | Wang Jiachao | China | 4:39.48 | |
| 4 | Christoph Burkard | Germany | 4:40.60 | |
| 5 | Wang Xiaofu | China | 4:50.04 | |
| 6 | Nikolai Willig | Germany | 4:50.39 | |
| 7 | Matt Levy | Australia | 4:51.77 | |
| 8 | Tom Miazga | United States | 5:09.50 | |

Q = qualified for final. WR = World Record. PR = Paralympic Record.
