= Grace Bowman =

Grace Bowman may refer to:

- Grace Bowman (equestrian) (born 1990), Australian Paralympic equestrian
- Grace Bowman (Secret Life of the American Teenager), a character on Secret Life of the American Teenager
- Grace Bowman (Colony), fictional character in Colony
