= Swimming at the 2008 Summer Paralympics – Men's 100 metre backstroke S8 =

Men's 100m Backstroke S8 at the XIII Paralympic Games
- Venue: Beijing National Aquatics Center
- Dates: 10 September
- Competitors: 15 from 11 nations
- Winning time: 1:06.33

Medalists
1st place, gold medalist(s)		Konstantin Lisenkov	Russia
2nd place, silver medalist(s)		Peter Leek	Australia
3rd place, bronze medalist(s)		Sean Fraser	Great Britain

The men's 100m backstroke S8 event at the 2008 Summer Paralympics took place at the Beijing National Aquatics Center on 10 September. There were two heats; the eight swimmers with the fastest times from those two heats advanced to the final.

== Results ==
=== Heats ===
Competed from 09:40.

==== Heat 1 ====
Rank	Name	Nationality	Time	Notes
1	Peter Leek	Australia	1:07.54	Q, PR
2	Alexey Fomenkov	Russia	1:13.06	Q
3	Ievgen Poltavskyi	Ukraine	1:13.40	Q
4	Mihovil Spanja	Croatia	1:13.62	Q
5	Drew Christensen	Canada	1:15.78	Q
6	Yann Nouard	France	1:17.14	
7	Gledson Soares	Brazil	1:19.13	

==== Heat 2 ====
Rank	Name	Nationality	Time	Notes
1	Konstantin Lisenkov	Russia	1:06.72	Q, WR
2	Sean Fraser	Great Britain	1:10.77	Q
3	Ricardo Moffatti	Australia	1:13.56	Q
4	Tom Miazga	United States	1:16.01	
5	David Malone	Ireland	1:16.80	
6	Blake Cochrane	Australia	1:17.72	
7	Rudy Garcia Tolson	United States	1:18.02	
	Wang Xiaofu	China		DQ

=== Final ===
Competed at 18:05.

Rank	Name	Nationality	Time	Notes
1st place, gold medalist(s)	Konstantin Lisenkov	Russia	1:06.33	WR
2nd place, silver medalist(s)	Peter Leek	Australia	1:07.28	
3rd place, bronze medalist(s)	Sean Fraser	Great Britain	1:11.28	
4	Alexey Fomenkov	Russia	1:12.33	
5	Ricardo Moffatti	Australia	1:12.58	
6	Ievgen Poltavskyi	Ukraine	1:13.40	
7	Mihovil Spanja	Croatia	1:14.25	
8	Drew Christensen	Canada	1:15.49	

Q = qualified for final. WR = World Record. PR = Paralympic Record. DQ = Disqualified.
