= Swimming at the 2008 Summer Paralympics – Men's 50 metre freestyle S8 =

Men's 50m Freestyle S8 at the XIII Paralympic Games
- Venue: Beijing National Aquatics Center
- Dates: 14 September
- Competitors: 14 from 8 nations
- Winning time: 26.45

Medalists
1st place, gold medalist(s)		Wang Xiaofu	China
2nd place, silver medalist(s)		Peter Leek	Australia
3rd place, bronze medalist(s)		Konstantin Lisenkov	Russia

The men's 50m freestyle S8 event at the 2008 Summer Paralympics took place at the Beijing National Aquatics Center on 14 September. There were two heats; the swimmers with the eight fastest times advanced to the final.

== Results ==
=== Heats ===
Competed from 10:28.

==== Heat 1 ====
Rank	Name	Nationality	Time	Notes
1	Konstantin Lisenkov	Russia	27.78	Q
2	Ben Austin	Australia	28.09	Q
3	Wei Yanpeng	China	28.55	Q
4	Ferenc Csuri	Hungary	29.13	
5	Sam Hynd	Great Britain	29.27	
6	Drew Christensen	Canada	29.30	
	Konstantinos Fykas	Greece		DQ

==== Heat 2 ====
Rank	Name	Nationality	Time	Notes
1	Wang Xiaofu	China	26.83	Q
2	Peter Leek	Australia	27.69	Q
3	Guo Jun	China	27.87	Q
4	Matt Levy	Australia	28.55	Q
5	Nikolai Willig	Germany	29.03	Q
6	Sean Fraser	Great Britain	29.08	
7	Mikhail Boyarin	Russia	30.42	

=== Final ===
Competed at 19:33.

Rank	Name	Nationality	Time	Notes
1st place, gold medalist(s)	Wang Xiaofu	China	26.45	WR
2nd place, silver medalist(s)	Peter Leek	Australia	26.89	
3rd place, bronze medalist(s)	Konstantin Lisenkov	Russia	27.18	
4	Guo Jun	China	27.46	
5	Ben Austin	Australia	27.82	
6	Wei Yanpeng	China	28.03	
7	Nikolai Willig	Germany	28.94	
8	Matt Levy	Australia	29.68	

Q = qualified for final. WR = World Record. DQ = Disqualified.
