= Cycling at the 2008 Summer Paralympics – Women's 1 km time trial (B&VI 1–3) =

Women's 1 km time trial (B&VI 1–3) at the XIII Paralympic Games
- Venue: Laoshan Velodrome
- Dates: 7 September
- Competitors: 16 (8 pairs) from 7 nations
- Winning time: 1:09.066

Medalists
1st place, gold medalist(s)		Aileen McGlynn & Ellen Hunter	Great Britain
2nd place, silver medalist(s)		Felicity Johnson & Katie Parker	Australia
3rd place, bronze medalist(s)		Lindy Hou & Toireasa Gallagher	Australia

The Women's 1 km time trial (B&VI 1–3) at the 2008 Summer Paralympics took place on 7 September at the Laoshan Velodrome.

The world record was broken during the event, by Aileen McGlynn and her pilot, Ellen Hunter (Great Britain). They took over two seconds off their previous world record set in 2006, and over three seconds off the Paralympic record they set in Athens in 2004.

== Records ==
Records prior to the event
PR	1:11.160	Aileen McGlynn (GBR); Pilot: Ellen Hunter (GBR)	Athens (Greece)	21 September 2004
WR	1:10.431	Aileen McGlynn (GBR); Pilot: Ellen Hunter (GBR)	Manchester (United Kingdom)	5 May 2006

PR = Paralympic Record WR = World Record

== Results ==
Rank	Name	250 m	500 m	750 m	Time	Speed (km/h)
Rank	Name	250 m	250–500	500–750	750–1000	Speed (km/h)
	Aileen McGlynn (GBR); Pilot: Ellen Hunter (GBR)	21.410 (1)	36.404 (1)	52.179 (1)	1:09.006	52.124 WR
	Aileen McGlynn (GBR); Pilot: Ellen Hunter (GBR)	21.410 (1)	14.994 (1)	15.775 (1)	16.887 (2)	52.124 WR
	Felicity Johnson (AUS); Pilot: Katie Parker (AUS)	21.724 (2)	37.235 (2)	53.343 (2)	1:10.465	51.089
	Felicity Johnson (AUS); Pilot: Katie Parker (AUS)	21.724 (2)	15.511 (2)	16.108 (2)	17.122 (3)	51.089
	Lindy Hou (AUS); Pilot: Katie Parker (AUS)	23.320 (5)	39.779 (5)	56.004 (4)	1:12.463	49.680
	Lindy Hou (AUS); Pilot: Katie Parker (AUS)	23.320 (5)	16.459 (4)	16.225 (3)	16.459 (1)	49.680
4	Karissa Whitsell (USA); Pilot: Mackenzie Woodring (USA)	22.209 (3)	38.298 (3)	55.052 (3)	1:12.787	49.459
4	Karissa Whitsell (USA); Pilot: Mackenzie Woodring (USA)	22.209 (3)	16.089 (3)	16.754 (4)	17.735 (5)	49.459
5	Jayne Parsons (NZL); Pilot: Annaliisa Farrell (NZL)	23.170 (4)	39.638 (4)	56.433 (5)	1:14.048	48.617
5	Jayne Parsons (NZL); Pilot: Annaliisa Farrell (NZL)	23.170 (4)	16.468 (5)	16.795 (5)	17.615 (4)	48.617
6	Genevieve Ouellet (CAN); Pilot: Mathilde Hupin (CAN)	23.374 (6)	40.103 (6)	57.365 (6)	1:15.639	47.594
6	Genevieve Ouellet (CAN); Pilot: Mathilde Hupin (CAN)	23.374 (6)	16.729 (7)	17.262 (7)	18.274 (7)	47.594
7	Catherine Mary Walsh (IRL); Pilot: Joanna Hickey (IRL)	24.110 (7)	40.809 (7)	57.948 (7)	1:16.208	47.239
7	Catherine Mary Walsh (IRL); Pilot: Joanna Hickey (IRL)	24.110 (7)	16.699 (6)	17.139 (6)	18.260 (6)	47.239
8	Ana Lopez (ESP); Pilot: Marina Girona (ESP)	25.420 (8)	43.136 (8)	1:01.117 (8)	1:19.712	45.162
8	Ana Lopez (ESP); Pilot: Marina Girona (ESP)	25.420 (8)	17.716 (8)	17.981 (8)	18.595 (8)	45.162
