= Swimming at the 2008 Summer Paralympics – Women's 100 metre breaststroke SB6 =

Women's 100m Breaststroke SB6 at the XIII Paralympic Games
- Venue: Beijing National Aquatics Center
- Dates: 12 September
- Competitors: 12 from 8 nations
- Winning time: 1:41.87

Medalists
1st place, gold medalist(s)		Elizabeth Johnson	Great Britain
2nd place, silver medalist(s)		Sarah Bowen	Australia
3rd place, bronze medalist(s)		Deborah Gruen	United States

The women's 100m breaststroke SB6 event at the 2008 Summer Paralympics took place at the Beijing National Aquatics Center on 12 September. There were two heats; the swimmers with the eight fastest times advanced to the final.

== Results ==
=== Heats ===
Competed from 10:41.

==== Heat 1 ====
Rank	Name	Nationality	Time	Notes
1	Sarah Bowen	Australia	1:44.44	Q
2	Deborah Gruen	United States	1:46.76	Q
3	Maria Goetze	Germany	1:54.28	Q
4	Steph McDougall	Canada	1:56.10	Q
5	Natasa Sobocan	Croatia	2:04.88	
6	Marianne Maeland	Norway	2:10.55	

==== Heat 2 ====
Rank	Name	Nationality	Time	Notes
1	Elizabeth Johnson	Great Britain	1:42.84	Q
2	Charlotte Henshaw	Great Britain	1:45.91	Q
3	Miranda Uhl	United States	1:50.80	Q
4	Katrina Porter	Australia	1:55.26	Q
5	Lalita Loureiro	Sweden	1:59.00	
6	Casey Johnson	United States	2:07.89	

=== Final ===
Competed at 19:16.

Rank	Name	Nationality	Time	Notes
1st place, gold medalist(s)	Elizabeth Johnson	Great Britain	1:41.87	
2nd place, silver medalist(s)	Sarah Bowen	Australia	1:42.39	
3rd place, bronze medalist(s)	Deborah Gruen	United States	1:44.00	
4	Charlotte Henshaw	Great Britain	1:45.28	
5	Maria Goetze	Germany	1:47.82	
6	Miranda Uhl	United States	1:48.44	
7	Katrina Porter	Australia	1:55.08	
8	Steph McDougall	Canada	1:57.78	

Q = qualified for final.
