= Athletics at the 2008 Summer Paralympics – Women's 100 metres T42 =

Women's 100m T42 at the XIII Paralympic Games
- Venue: Beijing National Stadium
- Dates: 13 September
- Competitors: 7 from 5 nations
- Winning time: 16.32

Medalists
1st place, gold medalist(s)		Perla Bustamante	Mexico
2nd place, silver medalist(s)		Annette Roozen	Netherlands
3rd place, bronze medalist(s)		Christine Wolf	Australia

The women's 100m T42 event at the 2008 Summer Paralympics took place at the Beijing National Stadium on 13 September. There were no heats in this event.

== Final ==
Competed at 18:15.

Rank	Name	Nationality	Time	Notes
1st place, gold medalist(s)	Perla Bustamante	Mexico	16.32	WR
2nd place, silver medalist(s)	Annette Roozen	Netherlands	17.13	
3rd place, bronze medalist(s)	Christine Wolf	Australia	17.49	
4	Ewa Zielinska	Poland	17.89	
5	Marije Smits	Netherlands	18.27	
6	Kelly Cartwright	Australia	18.36	
7	Claudia Biene	Germany	18.92	

WR = World Record.
