= Swimming at the 2008 Summer Paralympics – Men's 100 metre freestyle S8 =

Men's 100m Freestyle S8 at the XIII Paralympic Games
- Venue: Beijing National Aquatics Center
- Dates: 8 September
- Competitors: 16 from 9 nations
- Winning time: 58.84

Medalists
1st place, gold medalist(s)		Wang Xiaofu	China
2nd place, silver medalist(s)		Konstantin Lisenkov	Russia
3rd place, bronze medalist(s)		Peter Leek	Australia

The men's 100m freestyle S8 event at the 2008 Summer Paralympics took place at the Beijing National Aquatics Center on 8 September. There were two heats; the swimmers with the eight fastest times advanced to the final.

== Results ==
=== Heats ===
Competed from 10:42.

==== Heat 1 ====
Rank	Name	Nationality	Time	Notes
1	Ben Austin	Australia	59.62	Q, PR
2	Konstantin Lisenkov	Russia	1:00.32	Q
3	Ricardo Moffatti	Australia	1:00.67	Q
4	Sam Hynd	Great Britain	1:01.67	Q
5	Guo Jun	China	1:02.29	
6	Christoph Burkard	Germany	1:04.99	
7	Drew Christensen	Canada	1:06.14	
8	Ievgen Poltavskyi	Ukraine	1:11.78	

==== Heat 2 ====
Rank	Name	Nationality	Time	Notes
1	Peter Leek	Australia	59.00	Q, PR
2	Wang Xiaofu	China	59.68	Q
3	Konstantinos Fykas	Greece	1:00.96	Q
4	Tian Hengheng	China	1:02.09	Q
5	Sean Fraser	Great Britain	1:02.45	
6	Ferenc Csuri	Hungary	1:03.55	
7	Nikolai Willig	Germany	1:03.69	
8	Mikhail Boyarin	Russia	1:05.68	

=== Final ===
Competed at 19:56.

Rank	Name	Nationality	Time	Notes
1st place, gold medalist(s)	Wang Xiaofu	China	58.84	PR
2nd place, silver medalist(s)	Konstantin Lisenkov	Russia	59.01	
3rd place, bronze medalist(s)	Peter Leek	Australia	59.14	
4	Ben Austin	Australia	59.78	
5	Ricardo Moffatti	Australia	59.93	
6	Sam Hynd	Great Britain	1:01.04	
7	Konstantinos Fykas	Greece	1:01.40	
8	Tian Hengheng	China	1:01.89	

Q = qualified for final. PR = Paralympic record.
