= Darren Peters =

Darren Peters was the CEO of the Australian Paralympic Committee and CEO of Rowing Australia.

== Surf Life Saving Australia ==
He worked for Surf Life Saving Australia and was involved with the Australian Beach Safety and Management Program.

== Rowing Australia ==
In 2000, he was the CEO of Rowing Australia.

== Australian Paralympic Committee ==
Peters was new to the position of CEO of the Australian Paralympic Committee in 2003. He was the team's Chef de Mission for the 2006 Winter Paralympics. In 2008, Peters was the chef de mission for Australian Paralympic Committee. In that role, he spoke to the press about issues with athlete classification related to the 2008 Summer Paralympics. He also tried to dampen media suggestions the Australian team could earn its 1,000th all time Paralympic medal. In 2008, Peters was also the CEO of the Australian Paralympic Committee. While in these positions, Peters oversaw the Australian Paralympic swimming team getting a major sponsor, Speedo. He left the job after the Beijing Games. When Peters left his role in the APC, he was succeeded by Jason Hellwig, who held the position in an acting role until Mr. Murphy took over the position. In 2011, Hellwig succeed Peters as the chef de mission for the Australian Paralympic Committee.

After Peters left the position CEO at Australian Paralympic Committee, he took a job at Macquarie University as the Director Campus Engagement. He is now the Director of Campus Wellbeing at the University. He provided information to an author writing a book on the Paralympics.
