= Scott Vitale =

Australian wheelchair rugby player

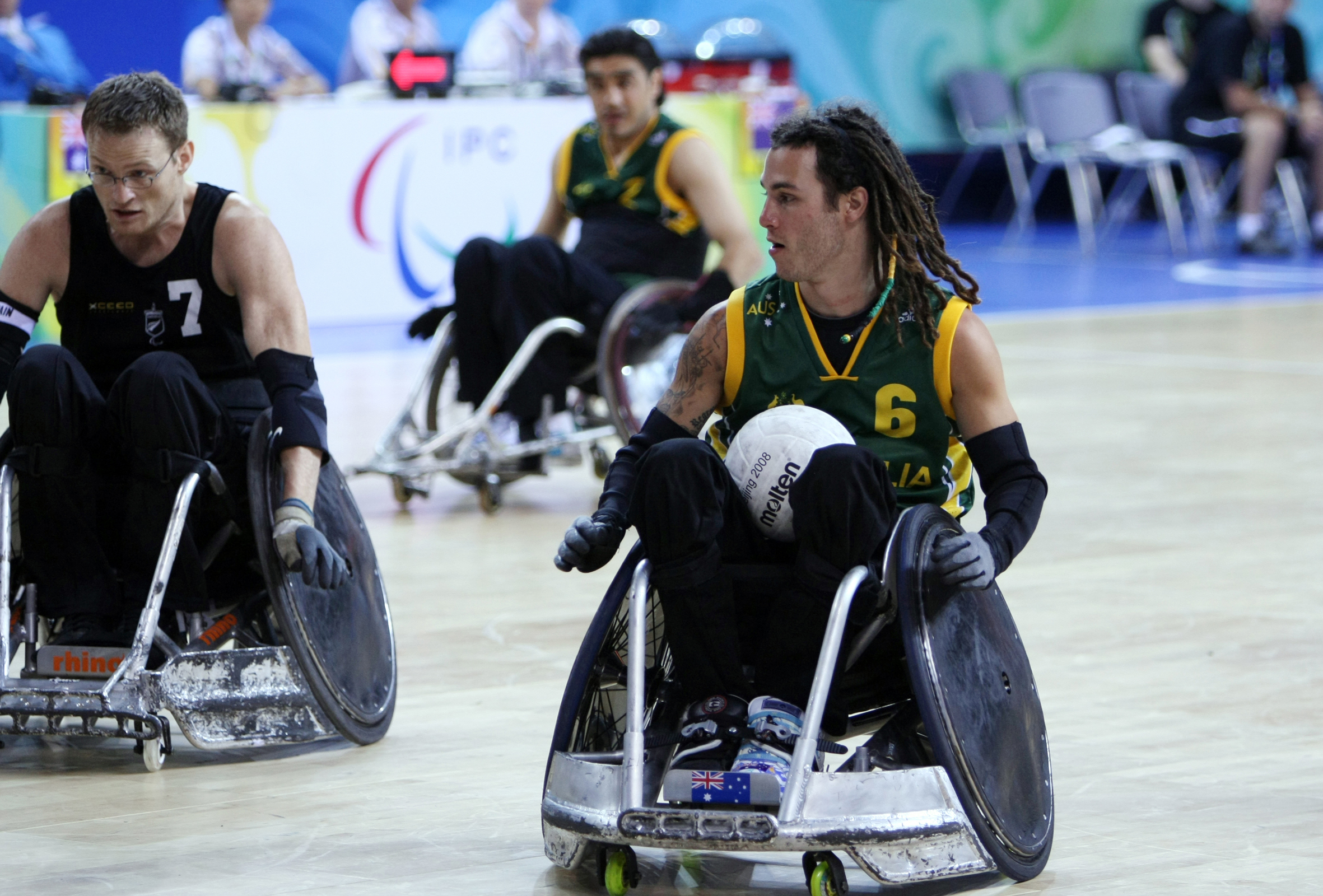
- Scott Vitale at the 2008 Summer Paralympics

Personal information
- Nationality: Australia
Medal record
Wheelchair rugby
Paralympic Games
Silver medal – second place	2008 Beijing	Men's team

Scott Vitale (born 6 July 1985) was a member of the Australian wheelchair rugby team which competed in the 2004 and 2008 Summer Paralympics.

Scott Vitale was born to Jill and Phillip Vitale on 6 July 1985, in Queensland, Australia. He was involved in a motorbike accident in September 2001. Scott began to play wheelchair rugby in 2002. A year later he was a member of the Australian National team. His wheelchair rugby career has also included such highlights as winning the Asia-Oceania Zonal Championships. He was named the "Best 1.5 player" at the Zonals in South Africa in 2005. In addition to the National team, Scott plays with the Queensland Crocs team. Due to the severity of his disability, he is classified as a 1.5-point player.

Scott and his team rose to the final round of the wheelchair rugby competition of the 2008 Paralympics. In that match against the United States, the team lost 53-44 and thus received the silver medal.
