= Mel Leckie =

Australian Paralympic cyclist (1984–2022)

Melissa Leckie
Personal information
- Nationality: Australian
- Born: 7 February 1984
- Died: 4 November 2022 (aged 38) Adelaide, South Australia, Australia

Sport
- Country: Australia
- Sport: Cycling
- Disability class: HC B

Melissa Katherine Leckie (7 February 1984 – 4 November 2022) was an Australian Paralympic cyclist. She competed at the 2008 Beijing Paralympics. Leckie was also a disability services and anti-bullying advocate.

== Personal life ==
Leckie was born on 7 February 1984. She was bullied at school as she was shorter than other classmates. On 12 June 2001, Leckie became a paraplegic after she returned to her old school and jumped from third floor in a suicide attempt. She spent over 12 months as an inpatient in the Hampstead Rehabilitation Centre due to the lack of government support in upgrading her family home. She undertook a Bachelor of Education, Junior Primary and Primary at the University of South Australia.

Leckie was an advocate for disability services. In 2012, she interrupted a speech by Prime Minister Julia Gillard at disability services conference in Sydney. She highlighted that disability pension was only 57 per cent of national minimum wage. In 2012, Leckie raised the issue of the lack of disability parking in Adelaide when fighting parking fines.

== Sport ==
As a child, Leckie was a talented gymnast and diver. In 2002, after becoming a paraplegic, she raced against Louise Sauvage in the Adelaide's City-Bay Fun Run.

Leckie took up hand-cycling in 2006 and busked in Adelaide's Rundle Mall to purchase a hand-cycle. In March 2007, she competed in her first race - Wild West Handcycling Tour in Perth. In 2007, she won two silver medals at a world championship event in France.

At the 2008 Beijing Paralympics, she competed in two hand-cycling events - finishing sixth in the Women's Road Individual Time Trial HC A-C and eighth in the Women's Road Individual Road Race HC A-C. Leckie was a category B hand cyclist and competed against more able Category C cyclists.

Leckie was an Australian Paralympic Committee Talent Search athlete and held a South Australian Sports Institute scholarship.
