= Shane Brand =

Australian Paralympic wheelchair rugby player

Personal information
- Nationality: Australia
- Born: 5 August 1973 (age 52)
Medal record
Wheelchair rugby
Paralympic Games
Silver medal – second place	2008 Beijing	Mixed

Shane Brand (born 5 August 1973) is an Australian Paralympic wheelchair rugby player. He is quadriplegic due to a motor vehicle accident. He won a silver medal with the Australian Steelers at the 2008 Beijing Games.
