= Sarah Bowen =

Australian Paralympic swimmer

Personal information
- Nationality: Australia
- Born: 15 April 1984 (age 42) Geelong
Medal record
Swimming
Paralympic Games
Gold medal – first place	2004 Athens	Women's 100 m Breaststroke SB6
Silver medal – second place	2008 Beijing	Women's 100 m Breaststroke SB6
IPC Swimming World Championships
Gold medal – first place	2002 Mar de Plata	Women's 100 m Breaststroke SB5
Gold medal – first place	2002 Mar Del Plata	Women's 4x100 m Medley Relay 34 pts
Silver medal – second place	2006 Durban	Women's 100 m Breaststroke SB6

Sarah Bowen, OAM(born 15 April 1984) is an Australian Paralympic swimmer. She was born in Geelong with achondroplasia dwarfism. She competed in four events at the 2004 Athens Games and won a gold medal in the Women's 100m Breaststroke SB6 event, for which she received a Medal of the Order of Australia. At the 2008 Beijing Games, she competed in three events and won a silver medal in the Women's 100m Breaststroke SB6 event.

At the IPC Swimming World Championships, she won gold medals in the Women's 100 m Breaststroke SB56 and Women's 4 × 100 m Medley Relay (#4 points) in 2002 and silver medal in the Women's 100m Breaststroke SB6 in 2006.

From 2002 to 2008, she was an Australian Institute of Sport paralympic swimming scholarship holder. She was coached at Geelong City Aquatic Club by Lucky Weerakkody and trained with Daniel Bell.

In 2004, she received the McHugh-Henderson award for her outstanding performances in the sport of swimming. The award is given out annually by the Short Statured People of Australia [SSPA] organisation.
