= Katie Parker =

Australian Paralympic cyclist

Personal information
- Nickname: KT
- Nationality: Australia
- Born: 19 February 1979 (age 47)
Medal record
Cycling
Paralympic Games
Silver medal – second place	2008 Beijing	Women's 1 km Time Trial B VI 1–3

Katie Parker (born 19 February 1979) is an Australian Paralympic tandem cycling pilot. She won a silver medal at the 2008 Beijing Games with Felicity Johnson in the Women's 1 km Time Trial B VI 1–3 event.
