= Christine Wolf =

German/Australian Paralympic athlete

Personal information
- Full name: Christine Ingrid Wolf
- Nationality: Australia Germany
- Born: 3 March 1980 (age 46) Kirchheim unter Teck, Germany
Medal record
Athletics
Paralympic Games
Gold medal – first place	2008 Beijing	Women's Long Jump F42
Silver medal – second place	2004 Athens	Women's Long jump F42
Bronze medal – third place	2008 Beijing	Women's 100 m T42
IPC Athletics World Championships
Bronze medal – third place	2006 Assen	Women's 100 m T42

Christine Ingrid Wolf, OAM (born 3 March 1980) is an Australian Paralympic athlete born in Germany who competed for Germany and Australia mainly in category F42 long jump and T 42 100 m events.

== Early life ==
Wolf was born in Kirchheim unter Teck (near Stuttgart) in southern Germany. She was diagnosed with leg cancer in the left leg at the age of 10 and had her leg amputated at the age of 15 after five years of unsuccessful chemotherapy and numerous infections. After her amputation, she was informed about the Paralympic Games and visited Atlanta for the 1996 Games. In 1997, she started running with a prosthetic leg.

== Career ==
She trained for the Sydney Games but could not compete in her classification TF42 as there were no events scheduled. She competed for Germany in the 2004 Athens Paralympics, she won a silver medal in the women's long jump F42 event. After the Games, she was dissatisfied with her results and nearly left the sport. At the Games, she became friendly with Australian athletes and in February 2005 moved to Australia to train at the Australian Institute of Sport (AIS). She was offered a scholarship and was coached by Irina Dvoskina. When applying for Australian citizenship, she stated that "I didn’t want the Germans to get any credit for my improvements so I said I wanted to compete for Australia". The citizenship was approved just prior to the Games. She competed at the 2008 Beijing Paralympics. There she won a gold medal in the women's long jump F42 event, for which she received a Medal of the Order of Australia, and a bronze medal in the women's 100m T42 event.

After the Games, she left the AIS in Canberra as she wanted to live somewhere with white sand, sunshine and palm trees. She moved to Cairns in Far North Queensland and works as a personal trainer. She now plays wheelchair basketball.
