= Nicole Kullen =

Australian equestrian

Personal information
- Nationality: Australia
- Born: 15 April 1980 Penrith, New South Wales, Australia
- Died: 6 August 2018 (aged 38) Blue Mountains, New South Wales, Australia

Sport
- Sport: Equestrian

Nicole Cassandra Kullen (15 April 1980 – 6 August 2018) was an Australian equestrian paralympian.

== Personal life ==
In August 1996, Kullen contracted meningococcal meningitis sepsis. Kullen spent the next six weeks on life support in an induced coma. After coming out of the coma, she spent a further six months in hospital recovering from the illness and undergoing rehabilitation. Due to the illness both her legs were amputated, giving her restricted arm movement, limited strength and no function in both hands and wrists. Her internal organs continued to cause health complications due to the effect the illness had on her organs. In 2000, Kullen lost all function in both kidneys and relied on peritoneal dialysis four times a day. In 2003, her son Kyle was born prematurely, but he later died following complications of the birth.

== Career ==
In 2000, Kullen started competing in dressage competitions with the Equestrian Federation of Australia for able-bodied riders and the RDAA for riders with a disability. Her finished international competition was the First International Combined Festival of Dressage at the International Para-Equestrian Competition in Belgium in 2006. At the 2007 FEI World Para Equestrian Dressage Championships, she won a silver and bronze medal. At the 2008 Beijing Paralympics, she finished fourth in the freestyle and eleventh in the championship.

After Kullen's retirement from international duties she focused her time to her Arabian horses at Nikshar Stud. Her mother, Margaret Kullen, started entering her stallions in shows at which Nicole would show them from her wheelchair. She posed a question to the board of the Arabian Horse Society of Australia (AHSA) saying that, "there was no rule regarding showing horses from a wheelchair". The board responded after consultation with Kullen and introduced a new rule into the AHSA Rule Book allowing wheelchair users to compete.

== Death ==
Kullen died on 6 August 2018 at the age of 38.

== Recognition ==
- 2005 – EFA NSW RDA Rider of the Year Award
- 2006 – Finalist in the Elders Nicoll and Ireland Sportsperson of the Year
- 2007 – The Horse Magazine ‘Eqvalan Rider of the Year’; Finalist in the Australian Sports Awards run by the Confederation of Australian Sport in the category of "Sportsperson of the Year with a Disability"
- 2008 – Finalist in the Elders Nicoll and Ireland Sportsperson of the Year; Awarded the NSW Institute of Sport ‘Ian Thorpe/Grand Slam International – Outstanding Achievement Female’ award at NSW Institute of Sport Awards Dinner
