= Grace Bowman (equestrian) =

Australian equestrian (born 1990)

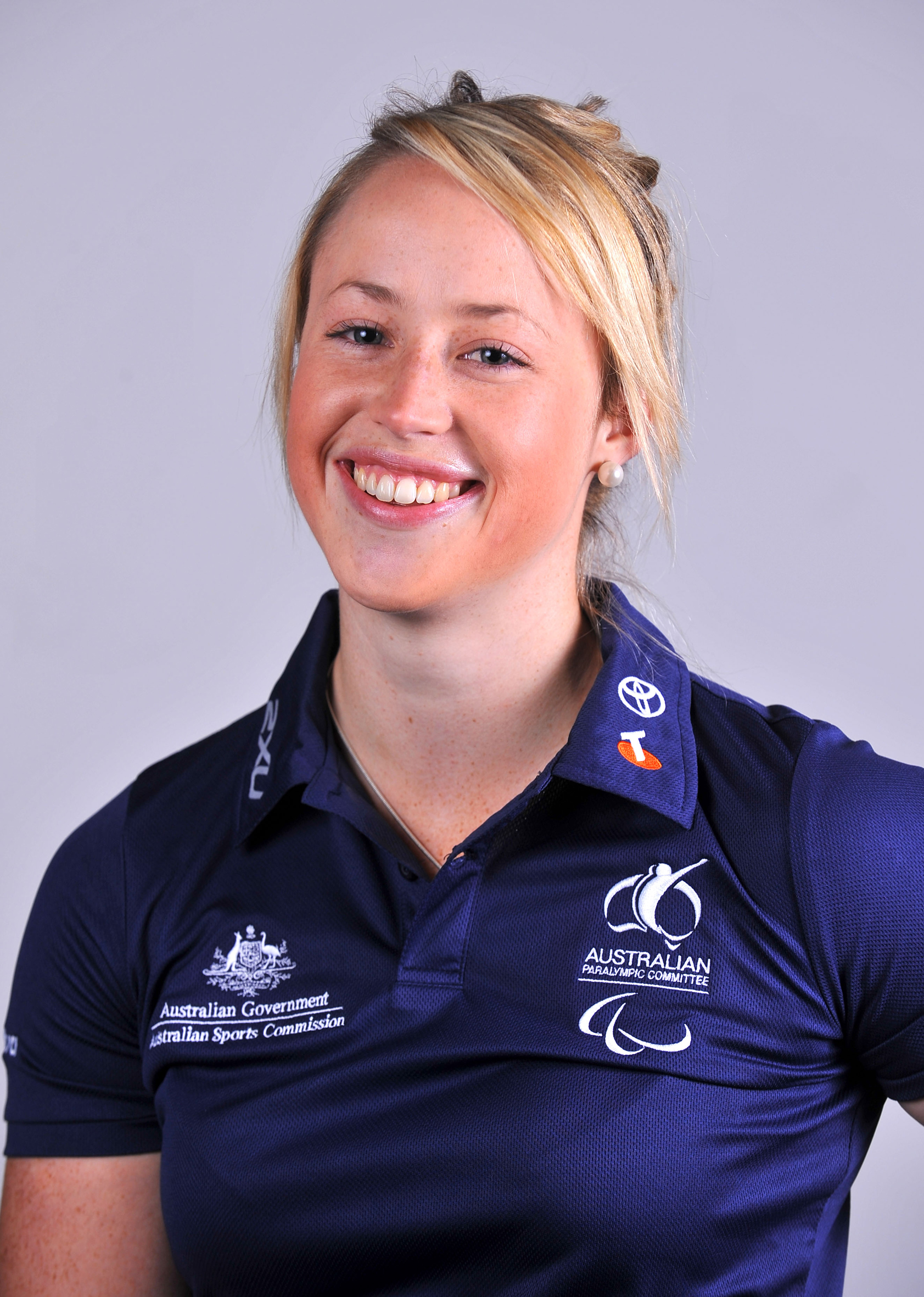
- 2012 Australian Paralympic team portrait of Bowman

Personal information
- Nationality: Australian
- Born: 16 July 1990 (age 36)

Sport
- Country: Australia
- Sport: Equestrian

Grace Bowman (born 16 July 1990) is an Australian equestrian. She was selected to represent Australia at the 2012 Summer Paralympics in the equestrian event. She did not medal at the 2012 Games.

== Personal ==
Bowman was born on 16 July 1990 in Moonta, South Australia. She attended high school in Kadina. As a child, she participated in several sports including netball and basketball. On 13 September 2002, at the age of twelve, she had an accident with a horse that resulted in her spinal cord becoming severed and dislocated. Her mother died following an accident, and her father died of cancer in 2011. As of 2012 she is a student at the University of Adelaide in Adelaide, where she is majoring in psychology.

Bowman was featured on ABC's Race to London.

== Equestrian ==
Bowman is a Grade 1B equestrian competitor. As of 2012, she practices at Kirby Stud Park, is coached by Megan Jones, an Australian Olympic equestrian, and rides a horse named Rolly. She was one of the first South Australians to ever represent Australia at the Paralympic Games. She started riding horses in 1996 when she was six years old, and owned her first horse when she was ten years old. At the age of 12, she had an accident while riding a horse that left her disabled.

Bowman first represented Australia in 2006. She was selected to represent Australia at the 2008 Summer Paralympics, and ultimately finished twelfth in her event with a score of 61.611. She finished sixth in the team event. Going into the 2008 Games, she was given A$4,000 to help with her costs. She was a member of Australia's 2009 National High Performance Squad.

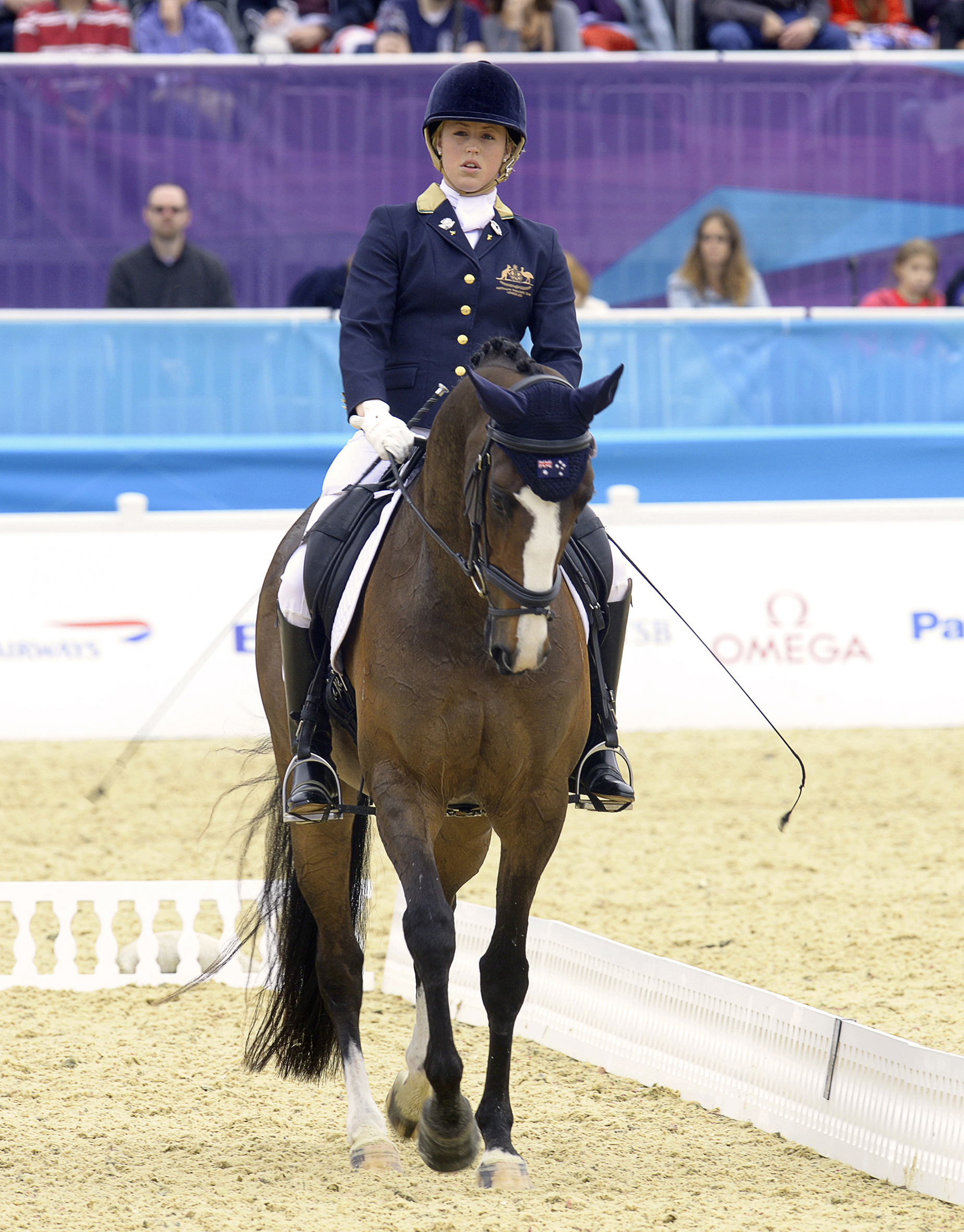
Bowman at the 2012 London Paralympics

In 2010 and 2011, Bowman rode Kirby Park Irish Joy. At the Kentucky hosted 2010 World Equestrian Games, she finished fourth. She finished first in the 2011 Tamworth NSW Grade II FEI Team Test event, the Championship Test event and the Freestyle event, finished first in the 2011 Grade II National Championships, and finished first in the 2011 Hong Kong Grade II CPEDI3 Freestyle competition. She was selected to represent Australia at the 2012 Summer Paralympics in equestrian. She did not medal at the 2012 Games.
