= Wang Xiaofu =

Chinese Paralympic swimmer

Sport
- Country: China
- Sport: Paralympic swimming
- Disability class: S8
Medal record
Paralympic swimming
Representing China
Paralympic Games
Gold medal – first place	2004 Athens	50m freestyle S8
Gold medal – first place	2004 Athens	100m butterfly S8
Gold medal – first place	2004 Athens	200m individual medley SM8
Gold medal – first place	2008 Beijing	50m freestyle S8
Gold medal – first place	2008 Beijing	100m freestyle S8
Silver medal – second place	2004 Athens	4x100m medley relay 34pts
Silver medal – second place	2008 Beijing	100m breaststroke SB8
Silver medal – second place	2008 Beijing	4x100m medley relay 34pts
Bronze medal – third place	2004 Athens	4x100m freestyle relay 34pts
Bronze medal – third place	2008 Beijing	100m butterfly S8
Bronze medal – third place	2008 Beijing	4x100m freestyle relay 34pts
World Championships
Gold medal – first place	2002 Mar del Plata	100m freestyle S8
Gold medal – first place	2002 Mar del Plata	400m freestyle S8
Gold medal – first place	2002 Mar del Plata	100m butterfly S8
Gold medal – first place	2002 Mar del Plata	200m individual medley SM8
Gold medal – first place	2006 Durban	50m freestyle S8
Gold medal – first place	2006 Durban	100m freestyle S8
Gold medal – first place	2006 Durban	400m freestyle S8
Gold medal – first place	2006 Durban	100m butterfly S8
Gold medal – first place	2006 Durban	200m individual medley SM8
Silver medal – second place	2006 Durban	100m breaststroke SB8

Wang Xiaofu (born November 1988) is a Chinese retired Paralympic swimmer and multiple gold medalist.

At the age of six, Wang lost his right arm and has impaired muscle strength in his legs following an electrical accident. At the age of 13, he began training for high-level Paralympic swimming, and won three gold medals when he participated in national games the following year. In 2007, he won nine gold medals in national competitions.

Wang represented China at the 2004 Summer Paralympics in Athens, winning three gold medals, a silver and a bronze, and setting three world records in the process. He has represented China again at the 2008 Summer Paralympics in Beijing, and carried his country's flag during the Games' Opening Ceremony.

Paralympics
Preceded by Zhang Haidong	Flagbearer for China; Beijing 2008	Succeeded by Zhang Lixin
