= Canada at the 2008 Summer Paralympics =

- Flag of Canada
- IPC code: CAN
- NPC: Canadian Paralympic Committee
- Website: www.paralympic.ca

in Beijing
- Competitors: 143 in 17 sports
- Flag bearer: Donovan Tildesley
- Medals Ranked 7th: Gold 19 Silver 10 Bronze 21 Total 50

Summer Paralympics appearances (overview)
- 1968; 1972; 1976; 1980; 1984; 1988; 1992; 1996; 2000; 2004; 2008; 2012; 2016; 2020; 2024

Canada sent a delegation to compete at the 2008 Summer Paralympics in Beijing. 143 Canadian athletes competed in 17 sports. Canada also sent several officials to the games, including Tara Grieve in boccia and Andrew Smith in rowing. Canada finished seventh on the medal table at the Beijing games after finishing third on the medal table at the 2004 Summer Paralympics (behind China and Great Britain). Swimmer Donovan Tildesley, a world record-holder and medalist at the 2000 and 2004 Paralympics, was the country's flag bearer at the opening ceremony. The delegation is headed by Chef de Mission Debbie Low.

Chantal Petitclerc ties the 5 gold medal record at a single Games for a Canadian, repeating the feat she performed at the 2004 Summer Paralympics, and tying Stephanie Dixon, who set the record at the 2000 Summer Paralympics.

== Medallists ==
Medal	Name	Sport	Event	Date
Gold	Chantal Petitclerc	Athletics	Women's 100 m - T54	7th
Gold	Valerie Grand'Maison	Swimming	Women's 100 m butterfly - S13	7th
Gold	Valerie Grand'Maison	Swimming	Women's 400 m freestyle - S13	8th
Gold	Dean Bergeron	Athletics	Men's 200 m - T52	10th
Gold	Lauren Barwick	Equestrian	Individual freestyle test - Grade II	10th
Gold	Valerie Grand'Maison	Swimming	Women's 100 m freestyle - S13	10th
Gold	Michelle Stilwell	Athletics	Women's 200 m - T52	11th
Gold	Chantal Petitclerc	Athletics	Women's 400 m - T54	12th
Gold	Chelsey Gotell	Swimming	Women's 200 m individual medley - SM13	12th
Gold	Dean Bergeron	Athletics	Men's 100 m - T52	13th
Gold	Paul Tingley	Sailing	1-person keelboat (2.4mR)	13th
Gold	Stéphanie Dixon	Swimming	Women's 100 m backstroke - S9	13th
Gold	Earle Connor	Athletics	Men's 100 m - T42	14th
Gold	Chantal Petitclerc	Athletics	Women's 200 m - T54	14th
Gold	Chantal Petitclerc	Athletics	Women's 800 m - T54	14th
Gold	Anne Polinario	Swimming	Women's 50 m freestyle - S10	14th
Gold	Chelsey Gotell	Swimming	Women's 100 m backstroke - S13	14th
Gold	Michelle Stilwell	Athletics	Women's 100 m - T52	15th
Gold	Chantal Petitclerc	Athletics	Women's 1500 m - T54	16th
Silver	Kirby Cote	Swimming	Women's 100 m butterfly - S13	7th
Silver	Lauren Barwick	Equestrian	Individual championship test - Grade II	8th
Silver	Chelsey Gotell	Swimming	Women's 100 m freestyle - S13	10th
Silver	Stéphanie Dixon	Swimming	Women's 200 m individual medley - SM9	11th
Silver	Diane Roy	Athletics	Women's 5000 m - T54	12th
Silver	Stéphanie Dixon	Swimming	Women's 400 m freestyle - S9	12th
Silver	Kirby Cote	Swimming	Women's 200 m individual medley - SM13	12th
Silver	Valerie Grand'Maison	Swimming	Women's 100 m backstroke - S13	14th
Silver	Valerie Grand'Maison	Swimming	Women's 50 m freestyle - S13	15th
Silver	Men's Wheelchair Basketball Team: Patrick Anderson; Jaimie Borisoff; Abditatch Dini; David Durepos; David Eng; Robert Hedges; Joey Johnson; Adam Lancia; Ross Norton; Richard Peter; Yvon Rouillard; Chris Stoutenberg	Basketball	Men's tournament	16th
Bronze	Jean Quevillon	Cycling	Men's individual pursuit - CP 3	7th
Bronze	Chelsey Gotell	Swimming	Women's 100 m butterfly - S13	7th
Bronze	Stéphanie Dixon	Swimming	Women's 100 m freestyle - S9	8th
Bronze	Chelsey Gotell	Swimming	Women's 400 m freestyle - S13	8th
Bronze	Stefanie Reid	Athletics	Women's 200 m - T44	9th
Bronze	Benoit Huot	Swimming	Men's 100 m freestyle - S10	9th
Bronze	Benoit Huot	Swimming	Men's 200 m individual medley - SM10	11th
Bronze	Donovan Tildesley	Swimming	Men's 400 m freestyle - S11	11th
Bronze	Dean Bergeron	Athletics	Men's 400 m - T52	12th
Bronze	Kyle Pettey	Athletics	Men's shot put - F33/34/52	12th
Bronze	Ilana Duff	Athletics	Women's 100 m - T53	12th
Bronze	Diane Roy	Athletics	Women's 400 m - T54	12th
Bronze	Valerie Grand'Maison	Swimming	Women's 200 m individual medley - SM13	12th
Bronze	Andre Beaudoin	Athletics	Men's 100 m - T52	13th
Bronze	John Scott McRoberts; Stacie Louttit	Sailing	2-person keelboat (SKUD18)	13th
Bronze	Diane Roy	Athletics	Women's 800 m - T54	14th
Bronze	Genevieve Ouellet; Mathilde Hupin	Cycling	Women's individual road race B&VI 1-3	14th
Bronze	Benoit Huot	Swimming	Men's 50 m freestyle - S10	14th
Bronze	Jason Dunkerley	Athletics	Men's 1500 m - T11	15th
Bronze	Benoit Huot	Swimming	Men's 400 m freestyle - S10	15th
Bronze	Wheelchair Rugby Team: Ian Chan; Jason Crone; Jared Funk; Garett Hickling; Trevor Hirschfield; Fabien Lavoie; Say Luangkhamdeng; Daniel Paradis; Erika Schmutz; Patrice Simard; Mike Whitehead; David Willsie	Rugby	Mixed - Open	16th

== Sports ==
=== Archery ===
==== Men ====
Athlete	Event	Ranking round		Round of 32	Round of 16	Quarterfinals	Semifinals	Finals	
Athlete	Event	Score	Seed	Opposition score	Opposition score	Opposition score	Opposition score	Opposition score	Rank
Kevin Evans	Men's individual compound open	675	9	Bye	Nazar (UKR); W 110-109	Stubbs (GBR); L 110-111	Did not advance		
Norbert Murphy	Men's individual compound W1	627	5	Lear (USA); W 98-75	Kinnunen (FIN); L 97-111	Did not advance			

==== Women ====
Athlete	Event	Ranking round		Round of 32	Round of 16	Quarterfinals	Semifinals	Finals	
Athlete	Event	Score	Seed	Opposition score	Opposition score	Opposition score	Opposition score	Opposition score	Rank
Lyne Tremblay	Women's individual recurve W1/W2	317	20	Kuncova (CZE); L 49-84	Did not advance				

=== Athletics ===
==== Men's track ====
Athlete	Class	Event	Heats		Semifinal		Final	
Athlete	Class	Event	Result	Rank	Result	Rank	Result	Rank
Jeff Adams	T54	400m	DNS		Did not advance			
Jeff Adams	T54	1500m	DSQ		Did not advance			
Andre Beaudoin	T52	100m	—N/a				17.77	3rd place, bronze medalist(s)
Andre Beaudoin	T52	200m	—N/a				32.07	4
Andre Beaudoin	T52	400m	1:02.66	6 Q	—N/a		1:05.58	8
Andre Beaudoin	T52	800m	2:08.69	7 q	—N/a		2:08.54	7
Dean Bergeron	T52	100m	—N/a				17.47 PR	1st place, gold medalist(s)
Dean Bergeron	T52	200m	—N/a				30.81 PR	1st place, gold medalist(s)
Dean Bergeron	T52	400m	59.16 PR	1 Q	—N/a		1:00.43	3rd place, bronze medalist(s)
Dean Bergeron	T52	800m	1:59.59	5 q	—N/a		2:02.01	6
Josh Cassidy	T54	800m	1:40.54	18	Did not advance			
Josh Cassidy	T54	1500m	3:09.93	11 Q	3:09.45	14	Did not advance	
Josh Cassidy	T54	5000m	10:15.11	4 q	—N/a		10:26.15	10
Jean Paul Compaore	T54	400m	49.42	11 q	58.75	16	Did not advance	
Jean Paul Compaore	T54	800m	1:36.66	3 Q	1:35.43	9	Did not advance	
Earle Connor	T42	100m	—N/a				12.32 PR	1st place, gold medalist(s)
Jason Dunkerley	T11	1500m	4:15:65	2 Q	—N/a		4:12.53	3rd place, bronze medalist(s)
Jon Dunkerley	T11	100m	12.12	19	Did not advance			
Jon Dunkerley	T11	200m	DSQ		Did not advance			
Jon Dunkerley	T11	400m	54.59	7 q	54.27	7	Did not advance	
Michel Filteau	T54	1500m	3:09.50	10 q	3:20.01	26	Did not advance	
Michel Filteau	T54	5000m	11:01.20	26	Did not advance			
Michel Filteau	T54	Marathon	—N/a				1:28:13	16
Eric Gauthier	T53	100m	18.19	13	Did not advance			
Eric Gauthier	T53	200m	28.75	15	Did not advance			
Eric Gauthier	T53	400m	55.94	17	Did not advance			
Eric Gauthier	T53	800m	1:48.11	17	Did not advance			
Clayton Gerein	T52	Marathon	—N/a				2:08:04	6
Brent Lakatos	T53	100m	15.26	3 Q	—N/a		15.21	6
Brent Lakatos	T53	200m	27.42	4 q	—N/a		27.44	5
Brent Lakatos	T53	400m	52.76	6 Q	—N/a		50.40	5
Mark Ledo	T54	5000m	11:30.43	27	Did not advance			
Mark Ledo	T54	Marathon	—N/a				DNF	
Colin Mathieson	T54	100m	15.15	16	Did not advance			
Colin Mathieson	T54	200m	26.37	14	Did not advance			
Colin Mathieson	T54	400m	49.81	15 q	51.69	12	Did not advance	
Dustin Walsh	T11	400m	55.48	11	Did not advance			

==== Men's field ====
Athlete	Class	Event	Final		
Athlete	Class	Event	Result	Points	Rank
Kyle Pettey	F33-34/52	Shot put	11.04	1023	3rd place, bronze medalist(s)

==== Women's track ====
Athlete	Class	Event	Heats		Semifinal		Final	
Athlete	Class	Event	Result	Rank	Result	Rank	Result	Rank
Ilana Duff	T53	100m	17.74	5 q	—N/a		17.69	3rd place, bronze medalist(s)
Ilana Duff	T53	200m	32.03	5 Q	—N/a		31.47	5
Ilana Duff	T53	400m	1:00.80	5 Q	—N/a		58.93	6
Tracey Ferguson	T54	200m	32.70	8 Q	—N/a		31.66	8
Tracey Ferguson	T54	1500m	3:36.11	11	Did not advance			
Tracey Ferguson	T54	5000m	—N/a				12:31.77	7
Jessica Matassa	T54	200m	30.62	5 q	—N/a		30.14	5
Jessica Matassa	T54	400m	55.22	4 Q	—N/a		57.02	7
Jessica Matassa	T54	800m	1:58.60	9	Did not advance			
Megan Muscat	T37	100m	15.84	16	Did not advance			
Megan Muscat	T37	200m	33.63	14	Did not advance			
Chantal Petitclerc	T54	100m	16.07 PR	1 Q	—N/a		16.15	1st place, gold medalist(s)
Chantal Petitclerc	T54	200m	28.25 WR	1 Q	—N/a		27.52 WR	1st place, gold medalist(s)
Chantal Petitclerc	T54	400m	52.50	1 Q	—N/a		52.02	1st place, gold medalist(s)
Chantal Petitclerc	T54	800m	1:50.51 PR	1 Q	—N/a		1:45.19 WR	1st place, gold medalist(s)
Chantal Petitclerc	T54	1500m	3:29.87	1 Q	—N/a		3:39.88	1st place, gold medalist(s)
Stefanie Reid	T44	100m	14.53	9	Did not advance			
Stefanie Reid	T44	200m	—N/a				28.85	3rd place, bronze medalist(s)
Leah Robinson	T37	100m	15.35	12	Did not advance			
Leah Robinson	T37	200m	31.85	10	Did not advance			
Diane Roy	T54	400m	54.88	3 Q	—N/a		54.72	3rd place, bronze medalist(s)
Diane Roy	T54	800m	1:57.53	7 Q	—N/a		1:48.07	3rd place, bronze medalist(s)
Diane Roy	T54	1500m	3:30.07	2 Q	—N/a		3:43.66	8
Diane Roy	T54	5000m	—N/a				12:29.08	2nd place, silver medalist(s)
Diane Roy	T54	Marathon	—N/a				1:40:37	8
Michelle Stilwell	T52	100m	—N/a				19.97 WR	1st place, gold medalist(s)
Michelle Stilwell	T52	200m	—N/a				36.18 WR	1st place, gold medalist(s)

==== Women's field ====
Athlete	Class	Event	Final		
Athlete	Class	Event	Result	Points	Rank
Stefanie Reid	F44	Long jump	4.61	-	5
Kris Vriend	F35-36	Discus throw	17.46	811	7
Kris Vriend	F35-36	Shot put	7.05	792	6

=== Boccia ===
Athlete	Event	Preliminaries			Quarterfinals	Semifinals	Final	
Athlete	Event	Opponent	Opposition Score	Rank	Opposition Score	Opposition Score	Opposition Score	Rank
Hanif Mawji	Mixed individual BC1	Beltran (ESP)	L 4-5	4	Did not advance			
Hanif Mawji	Mixed individual BC1	Wang Y (CHN)	L 2-3	4	Did not advance			
Hanif Mawji	Mixed individual BC1	Villano (ARG)	L 1-6	4	Did not advance			
Hanif Mawji	Mixed individual BC1	Hawker (USA)	W 3-2	4	Did not advance			
Brock Richardson	Mixed individual BC1	Shelly (IRL)	L 2-4	3	Did not advance			
Brock Richardson	Mixed individual BC1	Park J S (KOR)	W 7-0	3	Did not advance			
Brock Richardson	Mixed individual BC1	Ibarbure (ARG)	W 7-4	3	Did not advance			
Brock Richardson	Mixed individual BC1	Kitani (JPN)	L 3-4	3	Did not advance			
Adam Dukovich	Mixed individual BC2	Uchida (JPN)	L 4-5	2	Did not advance			
Adam Dukovich	Mixed individual BC2	Ollikka (FIN)	W 4-1	2	Did not advance			
Adam Dukovich	Mixed individual BC2	Z Robinson (GBR)	W 4-2	2	Did not advance			
Tammy McLeod	Mixed individual BC2	Cordero (ESP)	L 0-9	3	Did not advance			
Tammy McLeod	Mixed individual BC2	Yan Z (CHN)	L 1-5	3	Did not advance			
Tammy McLeod	Mixed individual BC2	Koivuniemi (FIN)	W 9-2	3	Did not advance			
Paul Gauthier	Mixed individual BC3	A Costa (POR)	L 3-5	2 Q	Polychronidis (GRE); L 3-6	Did not advance		
Paul Gauthier	Mixed individual BC3	Y Martin (ESP)	W 5-1	2 Q	Polychronidis (GRE); L 3-6	Did not advance		
Paul Gauthier	Mixed individual BC3	Stavropoulou (GRE)	W 9-1	2 Q	Polychronidis (GRE); L 3-6	Did not advance		
Alison Kabush	Mixed individual BC3	Pesquera (ESP)	W 5-1	2	Did not advance			
Alison Kabush	Mixed individual BC3	Raimundo (POR)	L 3-4	2	Did not advance			
Alison Kabush	Mixed individual BC3	Michos (GRE)	W 6-1	2	Did not advance			
Monica Martino	Mixed individual BC3	Park K W (KOR)	L 2-7	3	Did not advance			
Monica Martino	Mixed individual BC3	Shen (CHN)	L 4-5	3	Did not advance			
Monica Martino	Mixed individual BC3	Punsnit (THA)	W 3-2	3	Did not advance			
Adam Dukovich; Hanif Mawji; Tammy McLeod; Brock Richardson	Team	Great Britain (GBR)	L 6-7	3	Did not advance			
Adam Dukovich; Hanif Mawji; Tammy McLeod; Brock Richardson	Team	Argentina (ARG)	L 2-6	3	Did not advance			
Paul Gauthier; Alison Kabush; Monica Martino	Pairs BC3	South Korea (KOR)	L 1-9	3	Did not advance			
Paul Gauthier; Alison Kabush; Monica Martino	Pairs BC3	Spain (ESP)	L 1-9	3	Did not advance			
Paul Gauthier; Alison Kabush; Monica Martino	Pairs BC3	China (CHN)	W 8-2	3	Did not advance			

=== Cycling ===
==== Men's road ====
Athlete	Event	Time	Rank
Mark Beggs	Men's road race HC B	1:32:37	11
Mark Beggs	Men's road time trial HC B	23:41.60	10
Eric Bourgault	Men's road race LC1/LC2/CP4	DNF	
Eric Bourgault	Men's road time trial LC2	38:58.26	9
Mark Breton	Men's road race LC1/LC2/CP4	DNS	
Mark Breton	Men's road time trial LC1	38:15.21	11
Brayden McDougall	Men's road race LC3/LC4/CP3	1:59:13	27
Brayden McDougall	Men's road time trial CP3	DNF	
Rico Morneau	Men's road race HC B	1:32:09	9
Rico Morneau	Men's road time trial HC B	23:36.24	9
Jean Quevillon	Men's road race LC3/LC4/CP3	1:54:03	24
Jean Quevillon	Men's road time trial CP3	41:52.97	5
Daniel Chalifour; Alexandre Cloutier (pilot)	Men's road race B&VI1-3	2:18:04	7
Daniel Chalifour; Alexandre Cloutier (pilot)	Men's road time trial B&VI1-3	33:41.84	11
Stephane Cote; Pierre-Olivier Boily (pilot)	Men's road race B&VI1-3	2:17:53	6
Stephane Cote; Pierre-Olivier Boily (pilot)	Men's road time trial B&VI1-3	35:03.26	13
Brian Cowie; Devon Smibert	Men's road race B&VI1-3	2:29:27	15
Brian Cowie; Devon Smibert	Men's road time trial B&VI1-3	35:10.72	15

==== Men's track ====
Athlete	Event	Qualification		1st round		Final	
Athlete	Event	Time	Rank	Time	Rank	Opposition Time	Rank
Eric Bourgault	Men's 1km time trial LC2	—N/a				1:14.39	6
Eric Bourgault	Men's individual pursuit LC2	5:09.49	5	Did not advance			
Mark Breton	Men's 1km time trial LC1	—N/a				1:17.59	14
Mark Breton	Men's individual pursuit LC1	5:12.36	12	Did not advance			
Brayden McDougall	Men's 1km time trial CP3	—N/a				1:22.78	7
Jean Quevillon	Men's 1km time trial CP3	—N/a				1:21.35	6
Jean Quevillon	Men's individual pursuit CP3	4:03.730	3 Q	—N/a		Eckhard (FRA); W 4:03.277	3rd place, bronze medalist(s)
Daniel Chalifour; Alexandre Cloutier (pilot)	Men's 1km time trial B&VI1-3	—N/a				1:06.371	7
Daniel Chalifour; Alexandre Cloutier (pilot)	Men's individual pursuit B&VI1-3	4:25.554	3 Q	—N/a		Lindores (AUS); George (AUS); L 4:28.171	4
Stephane Cote; Pierre-Olivier Boily (pilot)	Men's 1km time trial B&VI1-3	—N/a				1:10.292	13
Stephane Cote; Pierre-Olivier Boily (pilot)	Men's individual pursuit B&VI1-3	4:41.677	10	Did not advance			
Brian Cowie; Marina Girona (pilot - time trial); Devon Smibert (pilot - ind. pursuit & sprint)	Men's 1km time trial B&VI1-3	—N/a				1:07.721	8
Brian Cowie; Marina Girona (pilot - time trial); Devon Smibert (pilot - ind. pursuit & sprint)	Men's individual pursuit B&VI1-3	4:29.195	5	Did not advance			
Brian Cowie; Marina Girona (pilot - time trial); Devon Smibert (pilot - ind. pursuit & sprint)	Men's sprint	11.373	5	Oshiro (JPN) / Takahashi (JPN); L 0-2	5	5-8th place matches Delaney (IRL) / Peelo (IRL); L 0-1	6
Mark Breton; Eric Bourgault; Jean Quevillon	Men's team sprint	56.183	6	Did not advance			

==== Women's road ====
Athlete	Event	Time	Rank
Shauna White	Women's road race HC A/B/C	1:17:10	4
Shauna White	Women's road time trial HC A/HC B/HC C	26:45.20	9
Genevieve Ouellet; Mathilde Hupin	Women's road race B&VI1-3	2:01:17	3rd place, bronze medalist(s)
Genevieve Ouellet; Mathilde Hupin	Women's road time trial B&VI1-3	42:53.16	10

==== Women's track ====
Athlete	Event	Qualification		1st round		Final	
Athlete	Event	Time	Rank	Time	Rank	Opposition Time	Rank
Genevieve Ouellet; Mathilde Hupin	Women's 1km time trial B&VI1-3	—N/a				1:15.639	6
Genevieve Ouellet; Mathilde Hupin	Women's individual pursuit B&VI1-3	3:54.909	7	Did not advance			

=== Equestrian ===
==== Individual events ====
Athlete	Horse	Event	Total	
Athlete	Horse	Event	Score	Rank
Lauren Barwick	Maile	Mixed individual championship test grade II	68.454	2nd place, silver medalist(s)
Lauren Barwick	Maile	Mixed individual freestyle test grade II	72.776	1st place, gold medalist(s)
Karen Brain	VDL Odette	Mixed individual championship test grade IV	59.097	12
Karen Brain	VDL Odette	Mixed individual freestyle test grade IV	62.136	10
Eleonore Elstone	Lutke	Mixed individual championship test grade IV	59.807	11
Eleonore Elstone	Lutke	Mixed individual freestyle test grade IV	60.683	12
Ashley Gowanlock	Donnymaskell	Mixed individual championship test grade Ib	63.714	7
Ashley Gowanlock	Donnymaskell	Mixed individual freestyle test grade Ib	64.221	8
Jennifer McKenzie	Valentine II	Mixed individual championship test grade II	56.818	16
Jennifer McKenzie	Valentine II	Mixed individual freestyle test grade II	56.389	16

==== Team ====
Athlete	Horse	Event	Individual score			Total	
Athlete	Horse	Event	TT	CT	Total	Score	Rank
Lauren Barwick	See above	Team	67.619	68.454	136.073*	385.010	7
Eleonore Elstone	See above	Team	62.357	59.807	122.164*	385.010	7
Ashley Gowanlock	See above	Team	63.059	63.714	126.773*	385.010	7
Jennifer McKenzie	See above	Team	57.047	56.818	113.865	385.010	7

* - denotes score is counted towards the total team's score.

=== Goalball ===
The men's and women's teams didn't win any medals; the men's team were knocked out by Lithuania in the quarter-finals and the women's team didn't succeed to the semifinals.

==== Men's tournament ====
Players

- Mario Caron
- Jeff Christy
- Rob Christy
- Bruno Hache
- Dean Kozak

Group B matches

7 September 2008

Canada	9 - 5	Iran

Beijing Institute of Technology Gymnasium
8 September 2008

United States	2 - 8	Canada

Beijing Institute of Technology Gymnasium
9 September 2008

Canada	2 - 11	China

Beijing Institute of Technology Gymnasium
10 September 2008

Sweden	6 - 5	Canada

Beijing Institute of Technology Gymnasium
11 September 2008

Canada	3 - 6	Brazil

Beijing Institute of Technology Gymnasium

Quarterfinals

12 September 2008

Lithuania	10 - 0	Canada

Beijing Institute of Technology Gymnasium

5-8th classification

13 September 2008

Canada	6 - 5	Finland

Beijing Institute of Technology Gymnasium

5/6th classification

14 September 2008

Denmark	8 - 5	Canada

Beijing Institute of Technology Gymnasium

==== Women's tournament ====
Players

- Amy Alsop
- Amy Kneebone
- Annette Lisabeth
- Nancy Morin
- Shawna Ryan
- Contessa Scott

Preliminary matches

7 September 2008

Canada	3 - 3	Sweden

Beijing Institute of Technology Gymnasium
8 September 2008

Brazil	6 - 5	Canada

Beijing Institute of Technology Gymnasium
9 September 2008

Canada	3 - 0	Japan

Beijing Institute of Technology Gymnasium
10 September 2008

Germany	0 - 1	Canada

Beijing Institute of Technology Gymnasium
11 September 2008

Canada	2 - 2	Denmark

Beijing Institute of Technology Gymnasium
12 September 2008

United States	1 - 1	Canada

Beijing Institute of Technology Gymnasium
13 September 2008

Canada	0 - 1	China

Beijing Institute of Technology Gymnasium

=== Judo ===
==== Men ====
Athlete	Event	First round	Quarterfinals	Semifinals	Repechage round 1	Repechage round 2	Final/ Bronze medal contest
Athlete	Event	Opposition Result	Opposition Result	Opposition Result	Opposition Result	Opposition Result	Opposition Result
Bill Morgan	Men's 100kg	Lyivytskyi (UKR); L 0000–0200	—N/a		Bye	Porter (USA); L 0000-0200	Did not advance

=== Rowing ===
Athlete	Event	Heats		Repechage		Final	
Athlete	Event	Time	Rank	Time	Rank	Time	Rank
Steve Daniel	Men's single sculls	6:11.64	11 R	6:09.37	8 FB	5:56.48	5
Caitlin Renneson; Wilfredo More Wilson	Mixed double sculls	4:50.54	11 R	5:12.47	10 FB	4:54.08	5
Laura Comeau; Meghan Montgomery; Victoria Nolan; Scott Rand; Anthony Theriault	Mixed coxed four	3:43.72	7 R	3:48.76	3 FA	3:45.66	6

=== Sailing ===
Athlete	Event	Race											Total points	Net points Total	Rank
Athlete	Event	1	2	3	4	5	6	7	8	9	10	11	Total points	Net points Total	Rank
Paul Tingley	2.4mR	1	1	5	2	(9)	(9)	2	4	5	1	—N/a	39	21	1st place, gold medalist(s)
John McRoberts; Stacie Louttit	Two person keelboat - SKUB 18	3	3	3	3	1	3	2	(8)	(4)	3	Race Cancelled	33	21	3rd place, bronze medalist(s)
Ken Kelly; Don Terlson; Marc Shaw	Open three-person keelboat - Sonar												114	86	11

=== Shooting ===
==== Men ====
Athlete	Event	Qualification		Final		
Athlete	Event	Score	Rank	Score	Total	Rank
Christos Trifonidis	Mixed 10m air rifle prone SH1	599	5 Q	104.8	703.8	4
Christos Trifonidis	Mixed 50m rifle prone SH1	584	15	Did not advance		

==== Women ====
Athlete	Event	Qualification		Final		
Athlete	Event	Score	Rank	Score	Total	Rank
Karen Van Nest	Women's 10m air pistol SH1	360	10	Did not advance		

=== Swimming ===
==== Men ====
Athlete	Class	Event	Heats		Final	
Athlete	Class	Event	Result	Rank	Result	Rank
Joe Barker	SB8	100m breaststroke	1:21.52	9	Did not advance	
Drew Christensen	S8	100m backstroke	1:15.78	8 Q	1:15.49	8
Drew Christensen	S8	100m butterfly	1:06.98	6 Q	1:07.74	6
Drew Christensen	S8	50m freestyle	29.30	12	Did not advance	
Drew Christensen	S8	100m freestyle	1:06.14	15	Did not advance	
Drew Christensen	S8	400m freestyle	5:18.13	11	Did not advance	
Drew Christensen	SM8	200m individual medley	2:37.86	4 Q	2:36.67	5
Devin Gotell	S13	100m backstroke	1:07.46	7 Q	1:08.17	8
Devin Gotell	S13	100m butterfly	1:09.37	17	Did not advance	
Devin Gotell	S13	400m freestyle	4:29.51	4 Q	4:28.73	7
Devin Gotell	SM13	200m individual medley	2:31.61	13	Did not advance	
Brian Hill	S13	100m backstroke	1:05.65	5 Q	1:05.52	5
Brian Hill	S13	100m butterfly	1:03.25	12	Did not advance	
Brian Hill	S13	50m freestyle	26.84	17	Did not advance	
Brian Hill	S13	100m freestyle	59.80	17	Did not advance	
Benoît Huot	S10	100m backstroke	1:03.85	3 Q	1:03.81	5
Benoît Huot	S10	100m butterfly	59.68	2 Q	59.68	4
Benoît Huot	S10	50m freestyle	24.84	3 Q	24.65	3rd place, bronze medalist(s)
Benoît Huot	S10	100m freestyle	54.45	2 Q	54.26	3rd place, bronze medalist(s)
Benoît Huot	S10	400m freestyle	4:25.96	6 Q	4:12.14	3rd place, bronze medalist(s)
Benoît Huot	SM10	200m individual medley	2:20.13	4 Q	2:15.22	3rd place, bronze medalist(s)
Donovan Tildesley	S11	100m backstroke	1:12.62	4 Q	1:11.90	5
Donovan Tildesley	S11	100m butterfly	1:11.03	7 Q	1:09.53	7
Donovan Tildesley	S11	50m freestyle	28.13	5 Q	28.08	7
Donovan Tildesley	S11	100m freestyle	1:02.14	4 Q	1:01.92	4
Donovan Tildesley	S11	400m freestyle	4:57.54	4 Q	4:49.45	3rd place, bronze medalist(s)

==== Women ====
Athlete	Class	Event	Heats		Final	
Athlete	Class	Event	Result	Rank	Result	Rank
Andrea Cole	S8	100m backstroke	1:39.26	10	Did not advance	
Andrea Cole	S8	100m butterfly	1:32.78	12	Did not advance	
Andrea Cole	S8	50m freestyle	37.41	14	Did not advance	
Andrea Cole	S8	100m freestyle	1:19.58	13	Did not advance	
Andrea Cole	S8	400m freestyle	5:35.51	5 Q	5:30.01	6
Kirby Cote	S13	100m butterfly	1:07.21	1 Q	1:06.62	2nd place, silver medalist(s)
Kirby Cote	S13	50m freestyle	—N/a		28.08	4
Kirby Cote	S13	100m freestyle	1:02.53	5 Q	1:00.95	4
Kirby Cote	SM13	200m individual medley	—N/a		2:28.65	2nd place, silver medalist(s)
Stephanie Dixon	S9	100m backstroke	1:10.85	1 Q	1:09.30 WR	1st place, gold medalist(s)
Stephanie Dixon	S9	100m butterfly	1:11.18	3 Q	1:11.04	4
Stephanie Dixon	S9	50m freestyle	30.98	7 Q	30.45	6
Stephanie Dixon	S9	100m freestyle	1:06.03	8 Q	1:03.89	3rd place, bronze medalist(s)
Stephanie Dixon	S9	400m freestyle	4:47.78	3 Q	4:39.73	2nd place, silver medalist(s)
Stephanie Dixon	SM9	200m individual medley	2:40.01	2 Q	2:37.54	2nd place, silver medalist(s)
Chelsey Gotell	S13	100m backstroke	1:11.83	1 Q	1:09.09	1st place, gold medalist(s)
Chelsey Gotell	S13	100m butterfly	1:07.91	3 Q	1:06.93	3rd place, bronze medalist(s)
Chelsey Gotell	S13	50m freestyle	—N/a		28.26	6
Chelsey Gotell	S13	100m freestyle	1:01.74	3 Q	1:00.26	2nd place, silver medalist(s)
Chelsey Gotell	S13	400m freestyle	4:44.05	3 Q	4:37.50	3rd place, bronze medalist(s)
Chelsey Gotell	SM13	200m individual medley	—N/a		2:28.15 WR	1st place, gold medalist(s)
Valerie Grand Maison	S13	100m backstroke	1:13.11	4 Q	1:10.42	2nd place, silver medalist(s)
Valerie Grand Maison	S13	100m butterfly	1:07.63	2 Q	1:06.49	1st place, gold medalist(s)
Valerie Grand Maison	S13	50m freestyle	—N/a		27.88	2nd place, silver medalist(s)
Valerie Grand Maison	S13	100m freestyle	1:00.39	2 Q	58.87 WR	1st place, gold medalist(s)
Valerie Grand Maison	S13	400m freestyle	4:36.16 PR	1 Q	4:28.64 WR	1st place, gold medalist(s)
Valerie Grand Maison	SM13	200m individual medley	—N/a		2:29.29	3rd place, bronze medalist(s)
Brittany Gray	S9	100m butterfly	1:15.11	11	Did not advance	
Brittany Gray	S9	400m freestyle	5:01.29	7 Q	4:58.08	7
Brittany Gray	SB8	100m breaststroke	1:32.86	9	Did not advance	
Brittany Gray	SM9	200m individual medley	2:46.58	8 Q	2:45.49	6
Laura Jensen	S7	100m backstroke	1:34.12	7 Q	1:31.90	7
Laura Jensen	S7	50m butterfly	48.07	12	Did not advance	
Laura Jensen	S7	50m freestyle	36.70	6 Q	36.10	6
Laura Jensen	S7	100m freestyle	—N/a		1:18.65	6
Laura Jensen	S7	400m freestyle	6:02.13	9	Did not advance	
Laura Jensen	SB7	100m breaststroke	—N/a		1:56.33	8
Laura Jensen	SM7	200m individual medley	3:30.98	9	Did not advance	
Steph McDougall	SB6	100m breaststroke	1:56.10	8 Q	1:57.78	8
Steph McDougall	SM7	200m individual medley	3:46.26	11	Did not advance	
Brianna Nelson	S7	100m backstroke	1:29.96	4 Q	1:30.43	6
Brianna Nelson	S7	50m freestyle	37.76	8 Q	37.96	7
Brianna Nelson	S7	100m freestyle	—N/a		1:19.11	7
Brianna Nelson	S7	400m freestyle	6:01.16	8 Q	6:00.99	8
Brianna Nelson	SB7	100m breaststroke	—N/a		1:54.35	7
Brianna Nelson	SM7	200m individual medley	DSQ		Did not advance	
Anne Polinario	S10	100m backstroke	1:18.06	11	Did not advance	
Anne Polinario	S10	50m freestyle	29.29	2 Q	28.51	1st place, gold medalist(s)
Anne Polinario	S10	100m freestyle	1:04.00	5 Q	1:04.01	5
Jacqueline Rennebohm	S12	100m butterfly	1:19.58	9	Did not advance	
Jacqueline Rennebohm	S12	50m freestyle	31.30	10	Did not advance	
Jacqueline Rennebohm	S12	100m freestyle	1:09.64	10	Did not advance	
Jacqueline Rennebohm	SB12	100m breaststroke	1:35.68	11	Did not advance	
Jacqueline Rennebohm	SM12	200m individual medley	2:59.14	11	Did not advance	
Katarina Roxon	S9	100m butterfly	1:22.72	19	Did not advance	
Katarina Roxon	S9	50m freestyle	31.85	14	Did not advance	
Katarina Roxon	SB8	100m breaststroke	1:34.59	12	Did not advance	
Katarina Roxon	SM9	200m individual medley	2:55.75	15	Did not advance	
Darda Sales	S9	100m backstroke	1:16.26	8 Q	1:15.91	7
Darda Sales	S9	50m freestyle	31.48	12	Did not advance	
Darda Sales	S9	100m freestyle	1:05.66	6 Q	1:05.65	8
Darda Sales	S9	400m freestyle	DSQ		Did not advance	
Amber Thomas	S11	50m freestyle	35.13	12	Did not advance	
Amber Thomas	S11	100m freestyle	1:13.85	6 Q	1:14.39	7
Jessica Tuomela	S11	50m freestyle	34.06	9	Did not advance	
Jessica Tuomela	S11	100m freestyle	1:14.89	7 Q	1:14.79	8

=== Table tennis ===
==== Men ====
Athlete	Event	Preliminaries				Quarterfinals	Semifinals	Final / BM	
Athlete	Event	Opposition Result	Opposition Result	Opposition Result	Rank	Opposition Result	Opposition Result	Opposition Result	Rank
Ian Kent	Men's singles C8	Jambor (SVK); L 0–3	Glikman (ISR); L 1-3	Ledoux (BEL); L 2-3	4	Did not advance			

=== Wheelchair basketball ===
The Canadian men's team won a silver medal after being defeated by Australia in the silver medal match while the women's team finished in fifth place overall.

==== Men's tournament ====
Players

- Patrick Anderson
- Jaimie Borisoff
- Abditatch Dini
- David Durepos
- David Eng
- Robert Hedges
- Joey Johnson
- Adam Lancia
- Ross Norton
- Richard Peter
- Yvon Rouillard
- Chris Stoutenberg

Group A Results

7 September 2008
20:45

Canada (CAN)	62–59	Germany (GER)
Scoring by quarter: 17 - 13, 6 - 13, 19 - 17, 20 - 16

National Indoor Stadium, Beijing
Attendance: 11797
Referees: Juan Manuel Urunuela (ESP)

8 September 2008
17:45

South Africa (RSA)	55–80	Canada (CAN)
Scoring by quarter: 12 - 25, 12 - 21, 24 - 16, 7 - 18

National Indoor Stadium, Beijing
Attendance: 1376
Referees: Matias Quintana (ARG)

9 September 2008
18:30

Canada (CAN)	62–52	Sweden (SWE)
Scoring by quarter: 25 - 14, 19 - 11, 14 - 12, 4 - 15

National Indoor Stadium, Beijing
Attendance: 8162
Referees: Gabriele Caliguiri (AUS)

10 September 2008
9:00

Japan (JPN)	48–75	Canada (CAN)
Scoring by quarter: 7 - 18, 18 - 19, 5 - 21, 18 - 17

National Indoor Stadium, Beijing
Attendance: 7262
Referees: Seppo Olavi Viljanen (CZE)

11 September 2008
16:15

Canada (CAN)	93–62	Iran (IRI)
Scoring by quarter: 30 - 16, 22 - 19, 21 - 20, 20 - 7

National Indoor Stadium, Beijing
Attendance: 9780
Referees: Cristian Ariel Salguero (ARG)

Quarterfinals

13 September 2008
11:15

Israel (ISR)	47–55	Canada (CAN)
Scoring by quarter: 4 - 20, 7 - 10, 13 - 14, 14 - 20

National Indoor Stadium, Beijing
Attendance: 12000
Referees: Gabriele Caligiuri (AUS)

Semifinals

14 September 2008
21:30

Canada (CAN)	69 (OT)–62 (OT)	United States (USA)
Scoring by quarter: 25 - 15, 10 - 8, 10 - 14, 4 - 12, Overtime: 20 - 13

National Indoor Stadium, Beijing
Attendance: 12000
Referees: Max Kindervater (GER)

Gold medal game

16 September 2008
19:30

Canada (CAN)	60–72	Australia (AUS)
Scoring by quarter: 17 - 16, 15 - 12, 15 - 26, 13 - 18

National Indoor Stadium, Beijing
Attendance: 12000
Referees: Edwin Frank Wallaart (NED)

==== Women's tournament ====
Players

- Chantal Benoit
- Tracey Ferguson
- Tara Feser
- Lisa Franks
- Katie Harnock
- Jennifer Krempien
- Janet McLachlan
- Kendra Ohama
- Cindy Ouellet
- Sabrina Pettinicchi
- Lori Radke
- Misty Thomas

Group B Results

8 September 2008
11:15

Canada (CAN)	59–32	Netherlands (NED)

National Indoor Stadium, Beijing

9 September 2008
16:15

Japan (JPN)	55–52	Canada (CAN)

National Indoor Stadium, Beijing

10 September 2008
16:15

Canada (CAN)	62–44	China (CHN)

National Indoor Stadium, Beijing

11 September 2008
17:45

Mexico (MEX)	38–71	Canada (CAN)

USTB Gymnasium, Beijing

Quarterfinals

12 September 2008
13:30

Canada (CAN)	49–53	Australia (AUS)
Scoring by quarter: 10 - 14, 17 - 14, 10 - 12, 12 - 13

National Indoor Stadium, Beijing
Attendance: 12215
Referees: Jean Manuel Urunuela (ESP)

Classification 5-8

14 September 2008
9:00

China (CHN)	49–53	Canada (CAN)

National Indoor Stadium, Beijing
Attendance: 12000
Referees: Christopher Gregory (GBR)

Fifth place

15 September 2008
15:45

Canada (CAN)	61–32	Netherlands (NED)

National Indoor Stadium, Beijing
Attendance: 12000
Referees: Zic Radomsky (ISR)

=== Wheelchair fencing ===
==== Men ====
Athlete	Event	Qualification			Round of 16	Quarterfinal	Semifinal	Final / BM	
Athlete	Event	Opposition	Score	Rank	Opposition Score	Opposition Score	Opposition Score	Opposition Score	Rank
Pierre Mainville	Men's épée B	Cratere (FRA)	L 1–5	3 Q	Hu D (CHN); L 8-15	Did not advance			
Pierre Mainville	Men's épée B	Rodgers (USA)	W 5-2	3 Q	Hu D (CHN); L 8-15	Did not advance			
Pierre Mainville	Men's épée B	Hu D (CHN)	W 5-4	3 Q	Hu D (CHN); L 8-15	Did not advance			
Pierre Mainville	Men's épée B	Soler (ESP)	W 5-2	3 Q	Hu D (CHN); L 8-15	Did not advance			
Pierre Mainville	Men's épée B	Hisakawa (JPN)	W 5-3	3 Q	Hu D (CHN); L 8-15	Did not advance			
Pierre Mainville	Men's sabre B	Francois (FRA)	L 1-5	6	Did not advance				
Pierre Mainville	Men's sabre B	Shenkevych (UKR)	L 2-5	6	Did not advance				
Pierre Mainville	Men's sabre B	Szekeres (HUN)	L 1-5	6	Did not advance				
Pierre Mainville	Men's sabre B	Fawcett (GBR)	L 3-5	6	Did not advance				
Pierre Mainville	Men's sabre B	Arnau (ESP)	L 3-5	6	Did not advance				

=== Wheelchair rugby ===
The Canadian rugby team won the bronze medal after narrowly defeating Great Britain in the bronze medal match.

Squad list	Group stage				Knockout stage		
Squad list	Pool Match 1 Opposition Result	Pool Match 2 Opposition Result	Pool Match 3 Opposition Result	Rank	Semifinal Opposition Result	Final Opposition Result	Rank
Ian Chan; Jason Crone; Jared Funk; Garett Hickling; Trevor Hirschfield; Fabien Lavoie; Say Luangkhamdeng; Daniel Paradis; Erika Schmutz; Patrice Simard; Mike Whitehead; David Willsie	United States; L 32-37	Japan; W 48-40	China; W 57-25	2 Q	Australia; L 40-41	Great Britain; W 47-41	3rd place, bronze medalist(s)

=== Wheelchair tennis ===
==== Men ====
Athlete	Class	Event	Round of 64	Round of 32	Round of 16	Quarterfinals	Semifinals	Finals
Athlete	Class	Event	Opposition Result	Opposition Result	Opposition Result	Opposition Result	Opposition Result	Opposition Result
Lee Carter	Open	Singles	Felix (SVK); L 4-6, 3-6	Did not advance				
Yann Mathieu	Open	Singles	Phillipson (GBR); L 3-6, 1-6	Did not advance				
Lee Carter; Yann Mathieu	Open	Doubles	—N/a	Hinson (USA); Moran (USA); L 6-7, 6-3, 4-6	Did not advance			

==== Women ====
Athlete	Class	Event	Round of 32	Round of 16	Quarterfinals	Semifinals	Finals
Athlete	Class	Event	Opposition Result	Opposition Result	Opposition Result	Opposition Result	Opposition Result
Yuka Chokyu	Open	Singles	Homan (NED); L 1-6, 2-6	Did not advance			

==== Quads ====
Athlete	Class	Event	Round of 16	Quarterfinals	Semifinals	Finals
Athlete	Class	Event	Opposition Result	Opposition Result	Opposition Result	Opposition Result
Sarah Hunter	Open	Singles	Wagner (USA); L 3-6, 6-4, 4-6	Did not advance		

== See also ==
- 2008 Summer Paralympics
- Canada at the 2008 Summer Olympics
