= Athletics at the 2008 Summer Paralympics – Women's 800 metres T54 =

Women's 800m T54 at the XIII Paralympic Games
- Venue: Beijing National Stadium
- Dates: 14 September
- Competitors: 11 from 7 nations
- Winning time: 1:45.19

Medalists
1st place, gold medalist(s)		Chantal Petitclerc	Canada
2nd place, silver medalist(s)		Tatyana McFadden	United States
3rd place, bronze medalist(s)		Diane Roy	Canada

The women's 800m T54 event at the 2008 Summer Paralympics took place at the Beijing National Stadium on 14 September. There were two heats; the first 3 in each heat (Q) plus the 2 fastest other times (q) qualified.

== Results ==
=== Heats ===
Competed from 21:20.

==== Heat 1 ====
Rank	Name	Nationality	Time	Notes
1	Chantal Petitclerc	Canada	1:50.51	Q, PR
2	Edith Hunkeler	Switzerland	1:53.08	Q
3	Shelly Woods	Great Britain	1:55.52	Q
4	Gunilla Wallengren	Sweden	1:56.43	q
5	Chelsea McClammer	United States	1:57.09	q

==== Heat 2 ====
Rank	Name	Nationality	Time	Notes
1	Tatyana McFadden	United States	1:56.56	Q
2	Diane Roy	Canada	1:57.53	Q
3	Liu Wenjun	China	1:57.81	Q
4	Jessica Matassa	Canada	1:58.60	
5	Sandra Graf	Switzerland	1:58.67	
6	Christie Dawes	Australia	2:00.21	

=== Final ===
Competed at 18:44.

Rank	Name	Nationality	Time	Notes
1st place, gold medalist(s)	Chantal Petitclerc	Canada	1:45.19	WR
2nd place, silver medalist(s)	Tatyana McFadden	United States	1:46.95	
3rd place, bronze medalist(s)	Diane Roy	Canada	1:48.07	
4	Edith Hunkeler	Switzerland	1:49.11	
5	Shelly Woods	Great Britain	1:50.03	
6	Gunilla Wallengren	Sweden	1:50.09	
7	Liu Wenjun	China	1:51.85	
8	Chelsea McClammer	United States	1:51.88	

Q = qualified for final by place. q = qualified by time. WR = World Record. PR = Paralympic Record.
