= Athletics at the 2004 Summer Paralympics – Women's 5000 metres T54 =

Women's 5,000m T54 at the XII Paralympic Games
- Venue: Athens Olympic Stadium
- Dates: 19–21 September 2004
- Competitors: 15 from 9 nations
- Winning time: 11:59.51

Medalists
1st place, gold medalist(s)		Wakako Tsuchida	Japan
2nd place, silver medalist(s)		Edith Hunkeler	Switzerland
3rd place, bronze medalist(s)		Cheri Blauwet	United States

Women's 5000m races for class T54 wheelchair athletes at the 2004 Summer Paralympics were held in the Athens Olympic Stadium on 19 and 21 September. The event consisted of 2 heats and a final, and was won by Wakako Tsuchida, representing Japan.

== 1st round ==
Qualified for next round

Heat 1

19 Sept. 2004, 21:15

Rank	Athlete	Time	Notes
1	Wakako Tsuchida (JPN)	11:59.74	PR
2	Sandra Graf (SUI)	11:59.94	
3	Christie Dawes (AUS)	12:00.07	
4	Cheri Blauwet (USA)	12:00.07	
5	Samira Berri (TUN)	13:48.04	
	Patrice Dockery (IRL)	DNF	
	Ariadne Hernández (MEX)	DNF	

Heat 2

19 Sept. 2004, 21:35

Rank	Athlete	Time	Notes
1	Diane Roy (CAN)	12:18.99	
2	Edith Hunkeler (SUI)	12:19.25	
3	Kazu Hatanaka (JPN)	12:19.66	
4	Eliza Stankovic (AUS)	12:21.08	
5	Yumi Kawashima (JPN)	12:53.38	
6	Souad Chamsi (TUN)	12:53.87	
7	Ivonne Reyes (MEX)	12:54.07	
	Angela Dilone (DOM)	DNF	

== Final round ==
21 Sept. 2004, 18:35

Rank	Athlete	Time	Notes
1st place, gold medalist(s)	Wakako Tsuchida (JPN)	11:59.51	PR
2nd place, silver medalist(s)	Edith Hunkeler (SUI)	11:59.69	
3rd place, bronze medalist(s)	Cheri Blauwet (USA)	12:00.04	
4	Diane Roy (CAN)	12:00.07	
5	Ariadne Hernández (MEX)	12:03.42	
6	Sandra Graf (SUI)	12:10.50	
7	Eliza Stankovic (AUS)	12:18.46	
8	Souad Chamsi (TUN)	12:33.40	
9	Patrice Dockery (IRL)	12:50.84	
10	Christie Dawes (AUS)	12:50.86	
11	Ivonne Reyes (MEX)	12:51.67	
12	Yumi Kawashima (JPN)	12:52.28	
13	Samira Berri (TUN)	14:47.80	
	Kazu Hatanaka (JPN)	DNF	
