= Mathilde Hupin =

Canadian surgeon and cyclist (born 1984)

Personal information
- National team: Canada
- Born: March 30, 1984 (age 42) Bromont, Quebec, Canada

Sport
- Country: Canada
- Sport: Cycling
Medal record
Women's Cycling
Representing Canada
Paralympic Games
Bronze medal – third place	2008 Beijing	Women's Road race B&VI 1–3

Mathilde Hupin-Debeurme (born March 30, 1984) is a Canadian orthopaedic surgeon and former cyclist who competed in cross-country, mountain, road, and track events. She had competed in national and international cycling such as the Canada Summer Games, the UCI Mountain Bike & Trials World Championships, the La Coupe du Monde Cycliste Féminine de Montréal, the Tour du Grand Montréal and the Summer Paralympic Games. Hupin won a bronze medal in the Women's Road Individual Road Race in the B VI 1–3 as part of the Canadian delegation at the 2008 Beijing Summer Paralympics, acting as the visual guide for the blind cyclist Genevieve Ouellet. She works as an orthopaedic surgeon at the Centre hospitalier universitaire Sainte-Justine and is a professor at the Université de Montréal Faculty of Medicine.

== Personal background ==
Hupin was born on March 30, 1984, in Bromont, Quebec. She is the daughter of Paul Hupin, who is also a cyclist. Hupin is a graduate of the Massey-Vanier High School in Cowansville, earning the 2001 Governor's Medal for attaining the highest average grades of any graduate in its sports-study program. She did a health sciences course at Cégep de Granby for two years to better her opportunity to matriculate to university and was part of various committees at the college. Hupin enrolled on a medical studies course at the Université de Sherbrooke from 2004 to 2008; she missed her graduation ceremony in September 2008 because she was in Beijing. She thereafter did a four-year residency in orthopaedics at the Université de Montréal starting in July 2008. Hupin is married to fellow professional track cyclist Martin Gilbert.

== Career ==
She took up the sport of cycling at the age of 12, riding on the mountain trails of Bromont. Hupin began doing it competitively from the age of 15, competing in its mountain, road and track variants. At age 16, she won the girl's cycling race at the Quebec Cup in September 1998. Hupin finished third in the cadet category of the cross-country race held as part of the third round of the Canada Cup mountain bike competition in Mont-Tremblant the following June. At the 2000 Canadian National Track Championships in Bromont, she finished third in each of the junior women's 500-metre individual time trial and the match sprint. Hupin finished second at that year's Canadian Championships and first at the Quebec Championships.

At the 2001 Gary Fisher Provincial Cup held in Bromont in May that year, she placed fourth in the senior elite category by cyclist aged between 19 and 29. Hupin qualified to compete at the 2001 Canada Summer Games in London, Ontario, by accruing enough qualifying points at the selection session that took place in Quebec City. Before that, she finished third in the junior category of the mountain biking race for cyclists aged between 17 and 18 held by the Bromont Mountain Bike Club in Hull. In London, Ontario, Hupin was the Quebec cycling team's cadet, and she partook in the cross-country, criterium, road race and time trial competitions. During 2002, she took part in the junior women's category of the Gary Fisher Provincial Cup in Bromont, the Bois de Belle-Rivière Cup in Mirabel, the Canadian Road Championships in London, Ontario and the 2002 UCI Mountain Bike & Trials World Championships in Austria; she qualified for the Austrian competition by finishing third overall at the 2002 Canada Cup.

In 2003, Hupin finished 14th at the Canada Cup Mountain Bike in Bromont, 74th at the Mountain Bike World Cup in Mont-Sainte-Anne and she partook in the Canadian International Women's Grand Prix in Saguenay, Quebec, during late September. The following year, she placed fourth at the Raphaël Levy Grand Prix in Saint-Jérôme and went on to come 40th at the Mont Saint-Anne World Cup. Hupin qualified for the 2005 Canada Summer Games in Regina, Saskatchewan, by finishing third in the qualifying cross-country cycling event and she was one of 12 Quebecois cyclists at the competition that August. She was sixth in the cross-country cycling race, eighth in the mountain bike competition, tenth in the criterium and 21st in the time trial. Hupin finished 31st out of 70 entrants in the women's race of the 2005 UCI Mountain Bike World Cup stage held in Mont Sainte-Anne.

During 2006, she came third at the Grand Prix de Sainte-Martine, fourth at the Grand Prix Raphaël Lévy in Bellefeuille, 31st in the road race at the National Championships Canada WE, 29th at the Canadian Mountain Bike Championships in Kamloops and 18th at the 2006 Canada Cup in Whistler, British Columbia. The following year, Hupin was 74th in the women's race held as part of the 2006 UCI Mountain Bike World Cup leg in Monte-Sainte-Anne and fourth in the Défi Sportif de Montréal road race. At the 2007 Pan American Games held that November in Cali, Colombia, she placed fifth in the road race, seventh in the kilometre, eighth in the track pursuit and ninth in the time trial. Hupin also participated in the Pan American Para-cycling Championships in the same city with the visually impaired cyclist Genevieve Ouellet after the Fédération Québecoise des Sports Cyclistes informed her of the opportunity to enter the competition.

She continued to partake in national cycling events such as the La Coupe du Monde Cycliste Féminine de Montréal, the Tour of Prince Edward Island and the Tour du Grand Montréal. Hupin and Ouellet were entered for the 2008 Summer Paralympics that took place that September in the city of Beijing, China as part of the Canadian delegation at the Games with Hupin serving as Ouellet's tandem visual guide. The duo trained at a training camp inside a velodrome in Australia, and they entered various Paralympic competitions as preparation for the Games. Their first event was the women's 3,000 individual pursuit (B&VI 1–3) on 10 September, where they placed seventh in the preliminary stage and failed to qualify for the final. Hupin and Ouellet then finished tenth in the Women's Road Individual Time Trial in the B VI 1–3 category two days later, before finishing third in the Women's Road Individual Road Race in the B VI 1–3 class to claim the bronze medal two days later. She was honored for her participants at the Paralympics by the in November 2008.

In 2009, Hupin and Ouellet won each of the women's kilo and pursuit races for visually impaired cyclists of the Canadian National Track Championships for Riders with a Disability. She also participated in the 2009 UCI Para-cycling Road World Championships in Piacenza and Cortemaggiore, Italy that July with Ouellet, placing fourth in the tandem road race. The duo finished sixth in the road race at the World Para-cycling Road Championships held in Bogogno, Italy. She has since been employed at the Centre hospitalier universitaire Sainte-Justine as a paediatric orthopaedic surgeon specializing in the hand and upper limb, and is a professor at the Université de Montréal Faculty of Medicine from 2016 after doing fellowships at Harvard University and the University of British Columbia. Hupin was part of the Dream project involving children from the ages of 7 to 17 playing a virtual reality game to reduce their anxiety and pain when medical procedures are being performed on them in hospital. She has also took part in annual medical missions in Colombia for the humanitarian organization Healing the Children since 2014.
