= Swimming at the 2008 Summer Paralympics – Women's 100 metre backstroke S13 =

Women's 100m Backstroke S13 at the XIII Paralympic Games
- Venue: Beijing National Aquatics Center
- Dates: 14 September
- Competitors: 9 from 7 nations
- Winning time: 1:09.09

Medalists
1st place, gold medalist(s)		Chelsey Gotell	Canada
2nd place, silver medalist(s)		Valerie Grand Maison	Canada
3rd place, bronze medalist(s)		Anna Efimenko	Russia

The women's 100m backstroke S13 event at the 2008 Summer Paralympics took place at the Beijing National Aquatics Center on 14 September. There were two heats; the swimmers with the eight fastest times advanced to the final.

== Results ==
=== Heats ===
Competed from 10:12.

==== Heat 1 ====
Rank	Name	Nationality	Time	Notes
1	Chelsey Gotell	Canada	1:11.83	Q
2	Kelley Becherer	United States	1:13.06	Q
3	Akari Kasamoto	Japan	1:14.43	Q
4	Jenny Coughlin	Great Britain	1:14.59	Q

==== Heat 2 ====
Rank	Name	Nationality	Time	Notes
1	Iryna Balashova	Ukraine	1:12.64	Q
2	Valerie Grand Maison	Canada	1:13.11	Q
3	Anna Efimenko	Russia	1:13.59	Q
4	Prue Watt	Australia	1:15.65	Q
5	Teigan van Roosmalen	Australia	1:16.26	

=== Final ===
Competed at 18:46.

Rank	Name	Nationality	Time	Notes
1st place, gold medalist(s)	Chelsey Gotell	Canada	1:09.09	WR
2nd place, silver medalist(s)	Valerie Grand Maison	Canada	1:10.42	
3rd place, bronze medalist(s)	Anna Efimenko	Russia	1:10.99	
4	Kelley Becherer	United States	1:11.53	
5	Iryna Balashova	Ukraine	1:12.65	
6	Jenny Coughlin	Great Britain	1:14.67	
7	Akari Kasamoto	Japan	1:14.85	
8	Prue Watt	Australia	1:16.05	

Q = qualified for final. WR = World Record.
