= 2011 IPC Athletics World Championships – Women's 5000 metres =

The women's 5000 metres at the 2011 IPC Athletics World Championships was held at the QEII Stadium on 22 January 2011.

== Medalists ==
Class	Gold	Silver	Bronze
T54	Amanda McGrory; United States	Sandra Graf; Switzerland	Rochelle Woods; Great Britain

== T54 ==
The Women's 5000 metres, T54 was held on January 22

T54 = normal upper limb function, partial to normal trunk function. May have significant function of the lower limbs.

=== Results ===
==== Final ====
Rank	Name	Nationality	Time	Notes
1st place, gold medalist(s)	Amanda McGrory (T53)	United States	12:52.41	
2nd place, silver medalist(s)	Sandra Graf	Switzerland	12:52.61	CR
3rd place, bronze medalist(s)	Rochelle Woods	Great Britain	12:52.82	
4	Wakako Tsuchida	Japan	13:15.14	
5	Diane Roy	Canada	13:36.56	
5	Sandra Hager	Switzerland	14:25.38	
7	Patricia Keller	Switzerland	14:26.12	
8	Liu Wenjun	China	14:27.34	

Key: CR = Championship Record

===== Splits =====
Intermediate	Athlete	Country	Mark
1000m	Rochelle Woods	Great Britain	2:38.13
2000m	Sandra Graf	Switzerland	5:09.70
3000m	Sandra Graf	Switzerland	7:41.13
4000m	Sandra Graf	Switzerland	10:12.58
