= Athletics at the 2008 Summer Paralympics – Women's 1500 metres T54 =

Women's 1,500m T54 at the XIII Paralympic Games
- Venue: Beijing National Stadium
- Dates: 16 September
- Competitors: 13 from 8 nations
- Winning time: 3:39.88

Medalists
1st place, gold medalist(s)		Chantal Petitclerc	Canada
2nd place, silver medalist(s)		Shelly Woods	Great Britain
3rd place, bronze medalist(s)		Edith Hunkeler	Switzerland

The women's 1,500m T54 event at the 2008 Summer Paralympics took place at the Beijing National Stadium on 16 September. There were two heats; the first 3 in each heat (Q) plus the 2 fastest other times (q) qualified.

== Results ==
=== Heats ===
Competed from 09:06.

==== Heat 1 ====
Rank	Name	Nationality	Time	Notes
1	Chantal Petitclerc	Canada	3:29.87	Q
2	Diane Roy	Canada	3:30.07	Q
3	Jessica Galli	United States	3:30.32	Q
4	Sandra Graf	Switzerland	3:30.69	q
5	Shirley Reilly	United States	3:33.33	q
6	Ajara Busonga Mohammed	Ghana	3:46.56	
7	Dague Diop	Senegal	4:18.84	

==== Heat 2 ====
Rank	Name	Nationality	Time	Notes
1	Shelly Woods	Great Britain	3:34.41	Q
2	Amanda McGrory	United States	3:34.56	Q
3	Edith Hunkeler	Switzerland	3:34.68	Q
4	Gunilla Wallengren	Sweden	3:35.40	
5	Christie Dawes	Australia	3:35.80	
6	Tracey Ferguson	Canada	3:36.11	

=== Final ===
Competed at 19:19.

Rank	Name	Nationality	Time	Notes
1st place, gold medalist(s)	Chantal Petitclerc	Canada	3:39.88	
2nd place, silver medalist(s)	Shelly Woods	Great Britain	3:40.99	
3rd place, bronze medalist(s)	Edith Hunkeler	Switzerland	3:41.03	
4	Jessica Galli	United States	3:41.68	
5	Amanda McGrory	United States	3:42.17	
6	Sandra Graf	Switzerland	3:42.26	
7	Shirley Reilly	United States	3:43.54	
8	Diane Roy	Canada	3:43.66	

Q = qualified for final by place. q = qualified by time.
