= Athletics at the 2008 Summer Paralympics – Women's 5000 metres T54 =

Women's 5,000m T54 at the XIII Paralympic Games
- Venue: Beijing National Stadium
- Dates: 12 September
- Competitors: 11* from 5 nations
- Winning time: 12:29.07

Medalists
1st place, gold medalist(s)		Amanda McGrory	United States
2nd place, silver medalist(s)		Diane Roy	Canada
3rd place, bronze medalist(s)		Shelly Woods	Great Britain

The women's 5,000m T54 event at the 2008 Summer Paralympics took place at the Beijing National Stadium on 12 September. There were no heats in this event.

The final was initially held on the 8th of September but a large crash occurred with just one lap remaining. Only five of the eleven starting athletes were able to finish and, after an appeal, the IPC decided to re-run the race. Three athletes were injured in the crash and only eight started on the 12th.

== Final ==
Rank	Name	Nationality	Time	Notes
1st place, gold medalist(s)	Amanda McGrory	United States	12:29.07	Originally placed 3rd
2nd place, silver medalist(s)	Diane Roy	Canada	12:29.08	Originally placed 1st
3rd place, bronze medalist(s)	Shelly Woods	Great Britain	12:29.32	Originally placed 2nd
4	Cheri Blauwet	United States	12:29.43	DNF first run
5	Sandra Graf	Switzerland	12:30.55	
6	Christie Dawes	Australia	12:31.66	
7	Tracey Ferguson	Canada	12:31.77	
8	Shirley Reilly	United States	12:32.19	
	Wakako Tsuchida	Japan		DNF - Injured
	Gunilla Wallengren	Sweden		DNF - Injured
	Edith Hunkeler	Switzerland		Disqualified

* Race originally held on 8 September. Crash and obstructions by race officials led to a re-run of the race.
