= Athletics at the 2008 Summer Paralympics – Women's marathon T54 =

Women's marathon T54 at the XIII Paralympic Games
- Dates: 17 September
- Competitors: 10 from 7 nations

Medalists
1st place, gold medalist(s)		Edith Hunkeler	Switzerland
2nd place, silver medalist(s)		Amanda McGrory	United States
3rd place, bronze medalist(s)		Sandra Graf	Switzerland

The women's marathon T54 was a marathon event in athletics at the 2008 Summer Paralympics in Beijing, for wheelchair athletes. It was the only marathon event held for women (whereas there were four marathons held for men, in various categories). Wheelchair athletes with a disability level more severe than T54 (i.e., T53) were permitted to compete in the T54 marathon. Ten athletes, from seven countries, took part; defending champion Kazu Hatanaka of Japan was not among them.

The result was extremely close. Edith Hunkeler of Switzerland won the gold medal, setting a new Paralympic record in 1:39:59, just one second ahead of the United States' Amanda McGrory, and two seconds ahead of compatriot Sandra Graf. The top eight athletes finished within a minute of one another, and the top five within five seconds.

== Results ==
Place	Athlete	Class	Time
1	Edith Hunkeler (SUI)	T54	1:39:59 (PR)
2	Amanda McGrory (USA)	T53	1:40:00
3	Sandra Graf (SUI)	T54	1:40:01
4	Shelly Woods (GBR)	T54	1:40:03
5	Cheri Blauwet (USA)	T53	1:40:04
6	Liu Wenjun (CHN)	T54	1:40:12
7	Shirley Reilly (USA)	T54	1:40:26
8	Diane Roy (CAN)	T54	1:40:37
9	Francesca Porcellato (ITA)	T53	1:54:27
10	Masouda Siffi (TUN)	T54	1:57:19

== See also ==
- Marathon at the Paralympics
