= Swimming at the 2008 Summer Paralympics – Women's 100 metre freestyle S13 =

Women's 100m Freestyle S13 at the XIII Paralympic Games
- Venue: Beijing National Aquatics Center
- Dates: 10 September
- Competitors: 9 from 5 nations
- Winning time: 58.87

Medalists
1st place, gold medalist(s)		Valerie Grand Maison	Canada
2nd place, silver medalist(s)		Chelsey Gotell	Canada
3rd place, bronze medalist(s)		Kelley Becherer	United States

The women's 100m freestyle S13 event at the 2008 Summer Paralympics took place at the Beijing National Aquatics Center on 10 September. There were two heats; the swimmers with the eight fastest times advanced to the final.

== Results ==
=== Heats ===
Competed from 09:20.

==== Heat 1 ====
Rank	Name	Nationality	Time	Notes
1	Kelley Becherer	United States	1:00.27	Q
2	Iryna Balashova	Ukraine	1:02.37	Q
3	Prue Watt	Australia	1:02.61	Q
4	Jenny Coughlin	Great Britain	1:06.18	Q

==== Heat 2 ====
Rank	Name	Nationality	Time	Notes
1	Valerie Grand Maison	Canada	1:00.39	Q
2	Chelsey Gotell	Canada	1:01.74	Q
3	Kirby Cote	Canada	1:02.53	Q
4	Rhiannon Henry	Great Britain	1:03.02	Q
5	Teigan van Roosmalen	Australia	1:07.64	

=== Final ===
Competed at 17:16.

Rank	Name	Nationality	Time	Notes
1st place, gold medalist(s)	Valerie Grand Maison	Canada	58.87	WR
2nd place, silver medalist(s)	Chelsey Gotell	Canada	1:00.26	
3rd place, bronze medalist(s)	Kelley Becherer	United States	1:00.46	
4	Kirby Cote	Canada	1:00.95	
5	Iryna Balashova	Ukraine	1:01.56	
6	Prue Watt	Australia	1:01.59	
7	Rhiannon Henry	Great Britain	1:01.79	
8	Jenny Coughlin	Great Britain	1:06.94	

Q = qualified for final. WR = World Record.
