= Athletics at the 2008 Summer Paralympics – Women's 400 metres T54 =

Women's 400m T54 at the XIII Paralympic Games
- Venue: Beijing National Stadium
- Dates: 12 September
- Competitors: 13 from 8 nations
- Winning time: 52.02

Medalists
1st place, gold medalist(s)		Chantal Petitclerc	Canada
2nd place, silver medalist(s)		Tatyana McFadden	United States
3rd place, bronze medalist(s)		Diane Roy	Canada

The women's 400m T54 event at the 2008 Summer Paralympics took place at the Beijing National Stadium on 12 September. There were two heats; the first 3 in each heat (Q) plus the 2 fastest other times (q) qualified.

== Results ==
=== Heats ===
Competed from 18:48.

==== Heat 1 ====
Rank	Name	Nationality	Time	Notes
1	Diane Roy	Canada	54.88	Q
2	Dong Hongjiao	China	55.93	Q
3	Manuela Schar	Switzerland	56.31	Q
4	Yvonne Sehmisch	Germany	58.32	
5	Madison de Rozario	Australia	59.78	
6	Jennifer Goeckel	United States	1:01.11	
7	Gloria Sanchez	Mexico	1:03.13	

==== Heat 2 ====
Rank	Name	Nationality	Time	Notes
1	Chantal Petitclerc	Canada	52.50	Q
2	Tatyana McFadden	United States	54.04	Q
3	Jessica Matassa	Canada	55.22	Q
4	Edith Hunkeler	Switzerland	55.33	q
5	Gunilla Wallengren	Sweden	57.48	q
6	Yazmith Bataz	Mexico	1:00.29	

=== Final ===
Competed at 20:08.

Rank	Name	Nationality	Time	Notes
1st place, gold medalist(s)	Chantal Petitclerc	Canada	52.02	
2nd place, silver medalist(s)	Tatyana McFadden	United States	53.49	
3rd place, bronze medalist(s)	Diane Roy	Canada	54.72	
4	Edith Hunkeler	Switzerland	55.25	
5	Dong Hongjiao	China	55.83	
6	Manuela Schar	Switzerland	56.24	
7	Jessica Matassa	Canada	57.02	
8	Gunilla Wallengren	Sweden	58.20	

Q = qualified for final by place. q = qualified by time.
