= Equestrian at the 2008 Summer Paralympics – Individual freestyle test grade II =

Individual Freestyle Test Grade II at the XIII Paralympic Games
- Paralympic Equestrian
- Venue: Hong Kong Olympic Equestrian Centre
- Dates: 10 September 2008
- Competitors: 17 from 15 nations

Medalists
1st place, gold medalist(s)		Lauren Barwick	Canada
2nd place, silver medalist(s)		Felicity Coulthard	Great Britain
3rd place, bronze medalist(s)		Britta Naepel	Germany

The Equestrian Individual Freestyle Test Grade II event at the 2008 Summer Paralympics was held in the Hong Kong Olympic Equestrian Centre on 10 September.

The competition was assessed by a ground jury composed of five judges placed at locations designated E, H, C, M, and B. Each judge rated the competitors' performances with scores out of 10 for technical difficulty and artistic merit. The ten scores from the jury were then summed to determine a rider's total percentage score.

The event was won by Lauren Barwick, representing Canada.

== Ground jury ==
Judge at E	Kjell Myhre ( Norway)
Judge at H	Alison Mastin ( Ireland)
Judge at C	Liliana Iannone ( Argentina), jury president
Judge at M	Janet Geary ( Australia)
Judge at B	Gudrun Hofinga ( Germany)

== Results ==
Rank	Rider	Horse		Score (and rank)					Tech/Art Score (Rk)	Total % score
Rank	Rider	Horse		E	H	C	M	B	Tech/Art Score (Rk)	Total % score
1st place, gold medalist(s)	Lauren Barwick (CAN)	Maile	Tech:	7.111 (1)	7.333 (1)	6.889 (2)	7.444 (1)	7.000 (2)	35.777 (1)	72.776
1st place, gold medalist(s)	Lauren Barwick (CAN)	Maile	Art:	7.333 (1)	7.500 (1)	7.222 (2)	7.500 (2)	7.444 (2)	36.999 (1)	72.776
2nd place, silver medalist(s)	Felicity Coulthard (GBR)	Roffelaar	Tech:	6.778 (3)	7.333 (1)	6.778 (3)	7.333 (2)	6.889 (3)	35.111 (2)	71.056
2nd place, silver medalist(s)	Felicity Coulthard (GBR)	Roffelaar	Art:	6.889 (4)	7.333 (2)	6.778 (3)	7.556 (1)	7.389 (4)	35.945 (3)	71.056
3rd place, bronze medalist(s)	Britta Naepel (GER)	Cherubin 15	Tech:	6.556 (6)	6.444 (8)	7.222 (1)	6.778 (3)	7.222 (1)	34.222 (3)	70.277
3rd place, bronze medalist(s)	Britta Naepel (GER)	Cherubin 15	Art:	6.889 (4)	6.889 (4)	7.333 (1)	7.222 (3)	7.722 (1)	36.055 (2)	70.277
4	Rebecca Hart (USA)	Norteassa	Tech:	7.000 (2)	6.778 (3)	6.333 (8)	6.444 (8)	6.889 (3)	33.444 (4)	68.110
4	Rebecca Hart (USA)	Norteassa	Art:	7.222 (2)	6.889 (4)	6.444 (9)	6.722 (9)	7.389 (4)	34.666 (4)	68.110
5	Sara Duarte (POR)	Neapolitano Morella	Tech:	6.667 (4)	6.667 (5)	6.111 (11)	6.667 (4)	6.556 (5)	32.668 (5)	66.336
5	Sara Duarte (POR)	Neapolitano Morella	Art:	6.778 (8)	6.667 (9)	6.556 (8)	6.778 (7)	6.889 (7)	33.668 (8)	66.336
6	Peng Yulian (CHN)	Furstendonner AF	Tech:	6.333 (9)	6.667 (5)	6.778 (3)	6.556 (5)	6.333 (8)	32.667 (6)	66.279
6	Peng Yulian (CHN)	Furstendonner AF	Art:	6.556 (13)	6.778 (8)	6.778 (3)	6.889 (5)	6.611 (9)	33.612 (10)	66.279
7	Elisa Melaranci (BRA)	Lester	Tech:	6.444 (7)	6.778 (3)	6.333 (8)	6.556 (5)	6.444 (7)	32.555 (7)	66.277
7	Elisa Melaranci (BRA)	Lester	Art:	6.889 (4)	7.000 (3)	6.444 (9)	6.889 (5)	6.500 (10)	33.722 (7)	66.277
8	Eilish Byrne (IRL)	Youri	Tech:	6.556 (5)	6.667 (5)	6.222 (10)	6.333 (9)	6.222 (10)	32.000 (8)	65.833
8	Eilish Byrne (IRL)	Youri	Art:	7.056 (3)	6.833 (6)	6.444 (9)	6.778 (7)	6.722 (8)	33.833 (5)	65.833
9	Caroline Nielsen (DEN)	Rostorn's Hatim-Tinn	Tech:	6.222 (10)	6.111 (10)	6.667 (5)	6.556 (5)	6.222 (10)	31.778 (9)	65.611
9	Caroline Nielsen (DEN)	Rostorn's Hatim-Tinn	Art:	6.778 (8)	6.444 (12)	6.667 (5)	7.000 (4)	6.944 (6)	33.833 (5)	65.611
10	Steffen Zeibig (GER)	Waldemar 27	Tech:	6.222 (10)	5.889 (14)	6.556 (6)	5.778 (13)	6.556 (5)	31.001 (11)	64.667
10	Steffen Zeibig (GER)	Waldemar 27	Art:	6.778 (8)	6.444 (12)	6.667 (5)	6.333 (13)	7.444 (2)	33.666 (9)	64.667
11	Thomas Haller (AUT)	Haller's Diorella	Tech:	6.222 (10)	6.444 (8)	5.889 (13)	6.222 (10)	6.333 (8)	31.110 (10)	63.665
11	Thomas Haller (AUT)	Haller's Diorella	Art:	6.722 (11)	6.500 (11)	6.222 (12)	6.611 (10)	6.500 (10)	32.555 (12)	63.665
12	Mariette Garborg (NOR)	Luthar	Tech:	6.444 (7)	6.111 (10)	6.444 (7)	5.667 (14)	5.778 (13)	30.444 (12)	63.554
12	Mariette Garborg (NOR)	Luthar	Art:	6.833 (7)	6.833 (6)	6.667 (5)	6.333 (13)	6.444 (12)	33.110 (11)	63.554
13	Carolin Utberg (SWE)	Weltini	Tech:	6.222 (10)	5.889 (14)	5.667 (15)	6.000 (11)	5.667 (15)	29.445 (14)	61.167
13	Carolin Utberg (SWE)	Weltini	Art:	6.611 (12)	6.444 (12)	6.000 (14)	6.389 (12)	6.278 (13)	31.722 (13)	61.167
14	Angelika Trabert (GER)	Londria 2	Tech:	6.111 (14)	6.000 (13)	6.000 (12)	5.556 (15)	6.111 (12)	29.778 (13)	60.778
14	Angelika Trabert (GER)	Londria 2	Art:	6.389 (14)	6.611 (10)	6.000 (14)	5.778 (16)	6.222 (14)	31.000 (14)	60.778
15	Yip Siu Hong (HKG)	Icy Bet	Tech:	5.444 (15)	6.111 (10)	5.889 (13)	5.889 (12)	5.778 (13)	29.111 (15)	58.166
15	Yip Siu Hong (HKG)	Icy Bet	Art:	5.833 (17)	6.333 (15)	5.556 (16)	5.722 (17)	5.611 (16)	29.055 (16)	58.166
16	Jennifer McKenzie (CAN)	Valentine II	Tech:	5.111 (17)	5.333 (16)	5.222 (17)	5.556 (15)	4.889 (17)	26.111 (17)	56.389
16	Jennifer McKenzie (CAN)	Valentine II	Art:	5.889 (16)	6.167 (16)	6.222 (12)	6.556 (11)	5.444 (17)	30.278 (15)	56.389
17	Kerry Noble (RSA)	De Vito	Tech:	5.222 (16)	5.111 (17)	5.333 (16)	5.333 (17)	5.222 (16)	26.221 (16)	55.053
17	Kerry Noble (RSA)	De Vito	Art:	5.944 (15)	5.944 (17)	5.444 (17)	5.833 (15)	5.667 (15)	28.832 (17)	55.053
	Petra van de Sande (NED)	Toscane	Withdrawn							
