= Athletics at the 2004 Summer Paralympics – Women's 1500 metres T54 =

Women's 1,500m T54 at the XII Paralympic Games
- Venue: Athens Olympic Stadium
- Dates: 23–24 September 2004
- Competitors: 14 from 8 nations
- Winning time: 3:26.89

Medalists
1st place, gold medalist(s)		Chantal Petitclerc	Canada
2nd place, silver medalist(s)		Edith Hunkeler	Switzerland
3rd place, bronze medalist(s)		Diane Roy	Canada

Women's 1500m races for class T54 wheelchair athletes at the 2004 Summer Paralympics were held in the Athens Olympic Stadium on 23 and 24 September. The event consisted of 2 heats and a final, and was won by Chantal Petitclerc, representing Canada.

== 1st round ==
Qualified for next round

Heat 1

23 Sept. 2004, 09:15

Rank	Athlete	Time	Notes
1	Chantal Petitclerc (CAN)	3:38.02	Q
2	Cheri Blauwet (USA)	3:38.14	Q
3	Edith Hunkeler (SUI)	3:38.21	Q
4	Christie Dawes (AUS)	3:38.60	q
5	Samira Berri (TUN)	3:38.87	
6	Patrice Dockery (IRL)	3:43.49	
7	Anne Wafula (KEN)	4:27.30	

Heat 2

23 Sept. 2004, 09:25

Rank	Athlete	Time	Notes
1	Diane Roy (CAN)	3:36.01	Q
2	Sandra Graf (SUI)	3:36.13	Q
3	Eliza Stankovic (AUS)	3:36.63	Q
4	Jessica Galli (USA)	3:36.78	q
5	Jennifer Goeckel (USA)	3:36.82	q
6	Ariadne Hernández (MEX)	3:36.99	q
7	Souad Chamsi (TUN)	3:48.67	

== Final round ==
24 Sept. 2004, 20:50

Rank	Athlete	Time	Notes
1st place, gold medalist(s)	Chantal Petitclerc (CAN)	3:26.89	WR
2nd place, silver medalist(s)	Edith Hunkeler (SUI)	3:28.48	
3rd place, bronze medalist(s)	Diane Roy (CAN)	3:28.62	
4	Eliza Stankovic (AUS)	3:28.66	
5	Jennifer Goeckel (USA)	3:29.27	
6	Christie Dawes (AUS)	3:29.50	
7	Cheri Blauwet (USA)	3:29.51	
8	Jessica Galli (USA)	3:29.51	
9	Ariadne Hernández (MEX)	3:30.13	
10	Sandra Graf (SUI)	3:30.30	
