= Swimming at the 2008 Summer Paralympics – Women's 50 metre freestyle S9 =

Women's 50m Freestyle S9 at the XIII Paralympic Games
- Venue: Beijing National Aquatics Center
- Dates: 14 September
- Competitors: 16 from 10 nations
- Winning time: 29.20

Medalists
| 1st place, gold medalist(s) | | Natalie du Toit | South Africa |
| 2nd place, silver medalist(s) | | Irina Grazhdanova | Russia |
| 3rd place, bronze medalist(s) | | Louise Watkin | Great Britain |

The women's 50m freestyle S9 event at the 2008 Summer Paralympics took place at the Beijing National Aquatics Center on 14 September. There were two heats; the swimmers with the eight fastest times advanced to the final.

== Results ==
=== Heats ===
Competed from 10:45.

==== Heat 1 ====
| Rank | Name | Nationality | Time | Notes |
|---|---|---|---|---|
| 1 | Annabelle Williams | Australia | 29.76 | Q |
| 2 | Louise Watkin | Great Britain | 30.06 | Q |
| 3 | Stephanie Dixon | Canada | 30.98 | Q |
| 4 | Lauren Steadman | Great Britain | 31.19 | |
| 5 | Emilie Gral | France | 31.36 | |
| 6 | Darda Sales | Canada | 31.48 | |
| 7 | Katarina Roxon | Canada | 31.85 | |
| 8 | Eztitxu Vivanco | France | 32.45 | |

==== Heat 2 ====
| Rank | Name | Nationality | Time | Notes |
|---|---|---|---|---|
| 1 | Natalie du Toit | South Africa | 29.45 | Q, PR |
| 2 | Irina Grazhdanova | Russia | 29.60 | Q |
| 3 | Stephanie Millward | Great Britain | 30.69 | Q |
| 4 | April Kerley | United States | 30.76 | Q |
| 5 | Mendy Meenderink | Netherlands | 31.15 | Q |
| 6 | Elizabeth Stone | United States | 31.24 | |
| 7 | Christiane Reppe | Germany | 31.84 | |
| | Sarai Gascón Moreno | Spain | | DQ |

=== Final ===
Competed at 20:04.

| Rank | Name | Nationality | Time | Notes |
|---|---|---|---|---|
| 1st place, gold medalist(s) | Natalie du Toit | South Africa | 29.20 | PR |
| 2nd place, silver medalist(s) | Irina Grazhdanova | Russia | 29.33 | |
| 3rd place, bronze medalist(s) | Louise Watkin | Great Britain | 29.80 | |
| 4 | Annabelle Williams | Australia | 29.91 | |
| 5 | April Kerley | United States | 30.20 | |
| 6 | Stephanie Dixon | Canada | 30.45 | |
| 7 | Stephanie Millward | Great Britain | 30.45 | |
| 8 | Mendy Meenderink | Netherlands | 31.20 | |

Q = qualified for final. PR = Paralympic Record. DQ = Disqualified.
