= Swimming at the 2008 Summer Paralympics – Women's 50 metre freestyle S13 =

Women's 50m Freestyle S13 at the XIII Paralympic Games
- Venue: Beijing National Aquatics Center
- Dates: 15 September
- Competitors: 8 from 5 nations
- Winning time: 27.85

Medalists
| 1st place, gold medalist(s) | | Kelley Becherer | United States |
| 2nd place, silver medalist(s) | | Valerie Grand Maison | Canada |
| 3rd place, bronze medalist(s) | | Iryna Balashova | Ukraine |

The women's 50m freestyle S13 event at the 2008 Summer Paralympics took place at the Beijing National Aquatics Center on 15 September. There were no heats in this event.

== Final ==
Competed at 19:56.

| Rank | Name | Nationality | Time | Notes |
|---|---|---|---|---|
| 1st place, gold medalist(s) | Kelley Becherer | United States | 27.85 | |
| 2nd place, silver medalist(s) | Valerie Grand Maison | Canada | 27.88 | |
| 3rd place, bronze medalist(s) | Iryna Balashova | Ukraine | 28.04 | |
| 4 | Kirby Cote | Canada | 28.08 | |
| 5 | Prue Watt | Australia | 28.16 | |
| 6 | Chelsey Gotell | Canada | 28.26 | |
| 7 | Rhiannon Henry | Great Britain | 28.59 | |
| 8 | Teigan van Roosmalen | Australia | 30.51 | |
