= Athletics at the 2008 Summer Paralympics – Men's 200 metres T52 =

The Men's 200m T52 had its Final held on September 10 at 17:15.

== Medalists ==
Gold	Dean Bergeron; Canada
Silver	Beat Bosch; Switzerland
Bronze	Peth Rungsri; Thailand

== Results ==
Place	Athlete	Final
1	Dean Bergeron (CAN)	30.81 PR
2	Beat Bosch (SUI)	31.41
3	Peth Rungsri (THA)	32.07
4	Andre Beaudoin (CAN)	32.07
5	Thomas Geierspichler (AUT)	32.31
6	Hirokazu Ueyonabaru (JPN)	32.46
7	Salvador Hernandez (MEX)	33.34
8	Marcos Castillo (VEN)	33.38
9	Josh Roberts (USA)	36.82
