= Swimming at the 2008 Summer Paralympics – Women's 400 metre freestyle S9 =

Women's 400m Freestyle S9 at the XIII Paralympic Games
- Venue: Beijing National Aquatics Center
- Dates: 12 September
- Competitors: 18 from 12 nations
- Winning time: 4:23.81

Medalists
1st place, gold medalist(s)		Natalie du Toit	South Africa
2nd place, silver medalist(s)		Stephanie Dixon	Canada
3rd place, bronze medalist(s)		Ellie Cole	Australia

The women's 400m freestyle S9 event at the 2008 Summer Paralympics took place at the Beijing National Aquatics Center on 12 September. There were three heats; the swimmers with the eight fastest times advanced to the final.

== Results ==
=== Heats ===
Competed from 11:11.

==== Heat 1 ====
Rank	Name	Nationality	Time	Notes
1	Christiane Reppe	Germany	4:54.25	Q
2	Elizabeth Stone	United States	5:01.24	Q
3	Francesca Secci	Italy	5:08.76	
4	Wang Qian	China	5:22.67	
5	Irina Grazhdanova	Russia	5:23.29	
	Darda Sales	Canada		DQ

==== Heat 2 ====
Rank	Name	Nationality	Time	Notes
1	Ellie Cole	Australia	4:45.17	Q
2	Stephanie Dixon	Canada	4:47.78	Q
3	Amanda Drennan	Australia	5:04.62	Q
4	Melissa Stockwell	United States	5:09.89	
5	Leila Marques	Portugal	5:10.30	
6	Tereza Diepoldova	Czech Republic	5:22.92	

==== Heat 3 ====
Rank	Name	Nationality	Time	Notes
1	Natalie du Toit	South Africa	4:24.75	Q, PR
2	Louise Watkin	Great Britain	4:54.46	Q
3	Brittany Gray	Canada	5:01.29	Q
4	Mendy Meenderink	Netherlands	5:06.97	
5	Lauren Steadman	Great Britain	5:10.10	
6	Dun Longjuan	China	5:25.70	

=== Final ===
Competed at 20:17.

Rank	Name	Nationality	Time	Notes
1st place, gold medalist(s)	Natalie du Toit	South Africa	4:23.81	WR
2nd place, silver medalist(s)	Stephanie Dixon	Canada	4:39.73	
3rd place, bronze medalist(s)	Ellie Cole	Australia	4:44.60	
4	Elizabeth Stone	United States	4:46.53	
5	Louise Watkin	Great Britain	4:47.14	
6	Christiane Reppe	Germany	4:51.59	
7	Brittany Gray	Canada	4:58.08	
8	Amanda Drennan	Australia	5:07.24	

Q = qualified for final. WR = World Record. PR = Paralympic Record. DQ = Disqualified.
