= Cycling at the 2008 Summer Paralympics – Women's road race =

The Women's individual road race events at the 2008 Summer Paralympics took place on September 13–14 at the Changping Triathlon Venue.

== Handcycle classes ==
=== HC A/B/C ===
The Women's individual road race HC A/B/C event took place on September 13. The race distance was 36.3 km.

Gold	Silver	Bronze
Andrea Eskau; Germany	Monique van der Vorst; Netherlands	Dorothee Vieth; Germany

Rank	Name	Time	Time behind	Avg. speed
1	Andrea Eskau (GER)	1:13:00		29.831
2	Monique van der Vorst (NED)	1:13:00	+0:00	
3	Dorothee Vieth (GER)	1:13:27	+0:27	
4	Shauna White (CAN)	1:17:10	+4:10	
5	Laura de Vaan (NED)	1:17:12	+4:12	
6	Rachel Morris (GBR)	1:17:12	+4:12	
7	Catherine Martin (FRA)	1:17:14	+4:14	
8	Mel Leckie (AUS)	1:31:14	+18:14	
9	Ursula Schwaller (SUI)	1:34:49	+21:49	
10	Marianne Maiboell (DEN)	1:34:58	+21:58	
11	Annemarie Donaldson (NZL)	1:39:22	+26:22	

== Blind & visually impaired class ==
=== B&VI 1-3 ===
The Women's individual road race B&VI 1-3 event took place on September 14. The race distance was 72.6 km.

Gold	Silver	Bronze
Fiadotava/Drazdova; Belarus	Whitsell/Woodring; United States	Ouellet/Hupin; Canada

Rank	Name	Time	Time behind	Avg. speed
1	Fiadotava/Drazdova (BLR)	1:55:35	-	37.687
2	Whitsell/Woodring (USA)	1:58:35	+3:00	
3	Ouellet/Hupin (CAN)	2:01:17	+5:42	
4	Hou/Gallagher (AUS)	2:01:17	+5:42	
5	Wisniewska/Ostrowska (POL)	2:01:20	+5:45	
6	Parkhamovich/Belaichuk (BLR)	2:01:20	+5:45	
7	Lopez/Girona (ESP)	2:01:24	+5:49	
8	Parsons/Farrell (NZL)	2:01:27	+5:52	
9	Walsh/Hickey (IRL)	2:03:14	+7:39	
	Coluzzi/Merloni (ITA)	DNF		
