= Equestrian at the 2008 Summer Paralympics – Individual championship test grade II =

Individual Championship Test Grade II at the XIII Paralympic Games
- Paralympic Equestrian
- Venue: Hong Kong Olympic Equestrian Centre
- Dates: 8 September 2008
- Competitors: 18 from 15 nations

Medalists
1st place, gold medalist(s)		Britta Naepel	Germany
2nd place, silver medalist(s)		Lauren Barwick	Canada
3rd place, bronze medalist(s)		Caroline Nielsen	Denmark

The Equestrian Individual Championship Test Grade II event at the 2008 Summer Paralympics was held in the Hong Kong Olympic Equestrian Centre on 8 September at 07:30.

The competition was assessed by a ground jury composed of five judges placed at locations designated E, H, C, M, and B. Each judge rated the competitors' performances with a percentage score. The five scores from the jury were then averaged to determine a rider's total percentage score.

The event was won by Britta Naepel, representing Germany.

== Ground jury ==
Judge at E	Anne Prain ( France)
Judge at H	Tarja Huttunen ( Finland)
Judge at C	Hanneke Gerritsen ( Netherlands), jury president
Judge at M	Liliana Iannone ( Argentina)
Judge at B	Alison Mastin ( Ireland)

== Results ==
T = Team Member (see Equestrian at the 2008 Summer Paralympics – Team).

Rank	Rider	Horse	Percentage score (and rank)					Total % score	Note
Rank	Rider	Horse	E	H	C	M	B	Total % score	Note
1st place, gold medalist(s)	Britta Naepel (GER)	Cherubin 15	73.182 (1)	70.909 (2)	67.727 (1)	72.727 (1)	75.000 (1)	71.909	T
2nd place, silver medalist(s)	Lauren Barwick (CAN)	Maile	68.636 (4)	73.636 (1)	65.455 (5)	67.727 (2)	66.818 (4)	68.454	T
3rd place, bronze medalist(s)	Caroline Nielsen (DEN)	Rostorn's Hatim-Tinn	69.091 (3)	70.455 (3)	66.818 (3)	66.818 (4)	67.727 (2)	68.182	T
4	Petra van de Sande (NED)	Toscane	70.000 (2)	65.455 (8)	67.727 (1)	67.273 (3)	64.091 (10)	66.909	T
5	Steffen Zeibig (GER)	Waldemar 27	64.091 (8)	70.000 (4)	66.364 (4)	65.455 (8)	64.545 (7)	66.091	T
6	Felicity Coulthard (GBR)	Roffelaar	67.273 (5)	65.455 (8)	64.091 (7)	66.364 (6)	64.545 (7)	65.546	
7	Carolin Rutberg (SWE)	Weltini	64.091 (8)	65.909 (7)	64.545 (6)	65.000 (9)	66.364 (6)	65.182	T
8	Angelika Trabert (GER)	Londria 2	65.455 (6)	67.727 (6)	63.636 (8)	64.545 (10)	63.182 (11)	64.909	T
9	Peng Yulian (CHN)	Furstendonner AF	62.727 (11)	63.636 (11)	62.727 (9)	65.909 (7)	67.727 (2)	64.545	
10	Mariette Garborg (NOR)	Luthar	65.455 (6)	65.000 (10)	60.909 (13)	66.818 (4)	62.727 (12)	64.182	T
11	Eilish Byrne (IRL)	Youri	63.636 (10)	60.000 (14)	62.273 (11)	63.636 (11)	64.545 (7)	62.818	
12	Rebecca Hart (USA)	Norteassa	55.455 (16)	68.636 (5)	62.727 (9)	59.091 (15)	66.818 (4)	62.545	T
13	Sara Duarte (POR)	Neapolitano Morella	62.273 (12)	63.636 (11)	61.364 (12)	62.273 (13)	57.727 (15)	61.455	
14	Thomas Haller (AUT)	Haller's Diorella	61.364 (13)	61.364 (13)	54.545 (15)	60.000 (14)	61.364 (13)	59.727	
15	Elisa Melaranci (BRA)	Lester	59.545 (14)	57.727 (16)	55.455 (14)	62.727 (12)	60.000 (14)	59.091	T
16	Jennifer McKenzie (CAN)	Valentine II	59.545 (14)	60.000 (14)	54.545 (15)	58.182 (16)	51.818 (16)	56.818	T
17	Kerry Noble (RSA)	De Vito	50.000 (17)	51.818 (17)	52.727 (17)	54.091 (18)	50.909 (17)	51.909	T
18	Yip Siu Hong (HKG)	Icy Bet	49.545 (18)	49.091 (18)	51.364 (18)	54.545 (17)	48.182 (18)	50.545	
