= Monique van der Vorst =

Dutch racing cyclist

Personal information
- Full name: Monique van der Vorst
- Born: 20 November 1984 (age 41)

Cycling career
- Sport: Cycling
- Current team: Liv Racing TeqFind
- Discipline: Road cycling

Professional team
- 2012–: Liv Racing TeqFind
Medal record
Representing Netherlands
Women's road cycling
Paralympic Games
Silver medal – second place	2008 Beijing	Time trial
Silver medal – second place	2008 Beijing	Road race

Monique van der Vorst (born 20 November 1984 in Gouda) is a Dutch racing cyclist. She is a two-time silver medal winner at the Paralympic Games.

After having a leg operation at the age of 13, her legs became paralyzed.

In March 2010, when she was 25 years old, Van der Vorst had an accident, where she was rammed by another cyclist while riding her hand cycle. Some months after this incident, she claimed to regain feeling in both her legs, after which she claimed to retrain herself to walk.

However, Spiegel Online has now reported that Van der Vorst was able to stand and walk during her career as a paraplegic handbiker, and that her neighbors had even reported seeing her dancing while supposedly paralyzed.

Eventually, Van der Vorst began road cycling, and has been signed to the Rabobank Women's Cycling team.

Awards
Preceded by (Netherlands) Esther Vergeer	Dutch Disabled Sportsman / woman of the Year; 2009	Succeeded by (Netherlands) Esther Vergeer
