= Swimming at the 2008 Summer Paralympics – Women's 100 metre butterfly S9 =

Women's 100m Butterfly S9 at the XIII Paralympic Games
- Venue: Beijing National Aquatics Center
- Dates: 7 September
- Competitors: 19 from 12 nations
- Winning time: 1:06.74

Medalists
1st place, gold medalist(s)		Natalie du Toit	South Africa
2nd place, silver medalist(s)		Ellie Cole	Australia
3rd place, bronze medalist(s)		Annabelle Williams	Australia

The women's 100m butterfly S9 event at the 2008 Summer Paralympics took place at the Beijing National Aquatics Center on 7 September. There were three heats; the swimmers with the eight fastest times advanced to the final.

== Results ==
=== Heats ===
Competed from 10:47.

==== Heat 1 ====
Rank	Name	Nationality	Time	Notes
1	Lizzie Simpkin	Great Britain	1:13.20	Q
2	Claire Cashmore	Great Britain	1:13.45	Q
3	Sarai Gascón Moreno	Spain	1:13.81	Q
4	Emilie Gral	France	1:14.50	
5	April Kerley	United States	1:17.15	
6	Ellen Keane	Ireland	1:18.50	

==== Heat 2 ====
Rank	Name	Nationality	Time	Notes
1	Ellie Cole	Australia	1:10.70	Q
2	Stephanie Dixon	Canada	1:11.18	Q
3	Brittany Gray	Canada	1:15.11	
4	Irina Grazhdanova	Russia	1:15.57	
5	Stephanie Millward	Great Britain	1:15.62	
6	Wang Qian	China	1:19.87	

==== Heat 3 ====
Rank	Name	Nationality	Time	Notes
1	Natalie du Toit	South Africa	1:07.08	Q, PR
2	Annabelle Williams	Australia	1:11.41	Q
3	Francesca Secci	Italy	1:13.25	Q
4	Elizabeth Stone	United States	1:14.99	
5	Paulina Wozniak	Poland	1:18.55	
6	Melissa Stockwell	United States	1:22.09	
7	Katarina Roxon	Canada	1:22.72	

=== Final ===
Competed at 20:14.

Rank	Name	Nationality	Time	Notes
1st place, gold medalist(s)	Natalie du Toit	South Africa	1:06.74	WR
2nd place, silver medalist(s)	Ellie Cole	Australia	1:10.92	
3rd place, bronze medalist(s)	Annabelle Williams	Australia	1:10.98	
4	Stephanie Dixon	Canada	1:11.04	
5	Sarai Gascón Moreno	Spain	1:11.05	
6	Lizzie Simpkin	Great Britain	1:12.19	
7	Francesca Secci	Italy	1:12.81	
8	Claire Cashmore	Great Britain	1:13.47	

Q = qualified for final. WR = World Record. PR = Paralympic Record.
