= Athletics at the 2008 Summer Paralympics – Men's 100 metres T52 =

The Men's 100m T52 had its Final held on September 13 at 19:20.

== Medalists ==
Gold	Dean Bergeron; Canada
Silver	Beat Bosch; Switzerland
Bronze	Andre Beaudoin; Canada

== Results ==
Place	Athlete	Final
1	Dean Bergeron (CAN)	17.47 PR
2	Beat Bosch (SUI)	17.51
3	Andre Beaudoin (CAN)	17.77
4	Salvador Hernandez (MEX)	17.89
5	Marcos Castillo (VEN)	18.23
6	Peth Rungsri (THA)	18.87
7	Josh Roberts (USA)	19.88
