= Beat Bösch =

Swiss Paralympic athlete (born 1971)

Personal information
- Nationality: Swiss
- Born: 27 November 1971 (age 54) Grosswangen, Switzerland

Sport
- Country: Switzerland
- Sport: sprinting athletics
- Disability: spinal
- Disability class: T52
- Events: Sprint; Middle distance
Medal record
Event	1st	2nd	3rd
Paralympic Games	0	3	1
World Championships	2	4	3
European Championships	2	1	0
Men's paralympic athletics
Representing Switzerland
Paralympic Games
Silver medal – second place	2004 Athens	100 m T52
Silver medal – second place	2008 Beijing	100 m T52
Silver medal – second place	2008 Beijing	200 m T52
Bronze medal – third place	2004 Athens	200 m T52
IPC World Championships
Gold medal – first place	2002 Lille	400 m T52
Gold medal – first place	2011 Christchurch	400 m T52
Silver medal – second place	2002 Lille	200 m T52
Silver medal – second place	2006 Assen	100 m T52
Silver medal – second place	2006 Assen	200 m T52
Silver medal – second place	2011 Christchurch	100 m T52
Silver medal – second place	2011 Christchurch	200 m T52
Bronze medal – third place	1998 Birmingham	100 m T52
Bronze medal – third place	2002 Lille	100 m T52
Bronze medal – third place	2015 Doha	100 m T52
IPC European Championships
Gold medal – first place	2014 Swansea	100 m T52
Gold medal – first place	2016 Grosseto	100 m T52
Silver medal – second place	2016 Grosseto	400 m T52

Beat Bösch (born 27 November 1971) is a Paralympic athlete from Switzerland competing mainly in category T52 sprint events.

Bösch took part in his first Summer Paralympics in 2000. Four years later he competed in the 2004 Summer Paralympics in Athens, Greece. There he won a silver medal in the men's 100 metres – T52 event and a bronze medal in the men's 200 metres – T52 event.

In the 2008 Summer Paralympics in Beijing, China, he won a silver medal in the men's 100 metres – T52 event, a silver medal in the 200 metres and went out in the first round of the 400 metres.

He also competed in the 2012 Summer Paralympics in London, where he was his country's flag bearer in the opening ceremony. He competed in the 100m, 200m and 400m events, finishing fourth in both the 100 and 200 metre events.
