= Cycling Canada =

Sports organization

- Sport: Cycling
- Abbreviation: CC
- Founded: 1882
- Affiliation: UCI
- Regional affiliation: COPACI
- CEO: Mathieu Boucher

Official website
- www.cyclingcanada.ca
- (Canada)

The Canadian Cycling Association (CCA), branded as Cycling Canada (CC) (French: Cyclisme Canada (CC)) is the national governing body of cycle racing in Canada.

== Role ==
Cycling Canada is a National Sport Organization whose main reason for being is the organization and promotion of cycling in Canada.

== Programs ==
Cycling Canada also operates CAN-BIKE, a nationally standardized series of courses on all aspects of cycling safely oriented toward recreational and utilitarian cycling.

== Partnerships ==
Cycling Canada is a member of the UCI and COPACI.

== Organization ==
Cycling Canada, previously the Association Cycliste Canadienne-Canadian Cycling Association (130177116rr0001) is registered with Canadian Revenue Agency as a Canadian amateur athletic association (RCAAA).

== Provincial governing bodies ==
Province	Federation
British Columbia	Cycling British Columbia – http://www.cyclingbc.net
Alberta	Alberta Bicycle Association – http://www.albertabicycle.ab.ca
Saskatchewan	Saskatchewan Cycling Association – http://www.saskcycling.ca
Manitoba	Manitoba Cycling Association – http://www.cycling.mb.ca
Ontario	Ontario Cycling Association – http://www.ontariocycling.org
Quebec	Quebec Cycling Federation (Fédération Québecoise des Sports Cyclistes)
New Brunswick	Velo New Brunswick – http://www.velo.nb.ca
Nova Scotia	Bicycle Nova Scotia – http://www.bicycle.ns.ca
Newfoundland and Labrador	Bicycle Newfoundland and Labrador – https://bicyclenl.com
Yukon	Cycling Association of Yukon
Prince Edward Island	Cycling PEI – http://www.sportpei.pe.ca
