= Athletics at the 2008 Summer Paralympics – Women's 200 metres T54 =

Women's 200m T54 at the XIII Paralympic Games
- Venue: Beijing National Stadium
- Dates: 14 September
- Competitors: 17 from 13 nations
- Winning time: 27.52

Medalists
1st place, gold medalist(s)		Chantal Petitclerc	Canada
2nd place, silver medalist(s)		Tatyana McFadden	United States
3rd place, bronze medalist(s)		Manuela Schar	Switzerland

The women's 200m T54 event at the 2008 Summer Paralympics took place at the Beijing National Stadium on 14 September. There were three heats; the first 2 in each heat (Q) plus the 2 fastest other times (q) qualified.

== Results ==
=== Heats ===
Competed from 12:00.

==== Heat 1 ====
Rank	Name	Nationality	Time	Notes
1	Yazmith Bataz	Mexico	31.99	Q
2	Tracey Ferguson	Canada	32.70	Q
3	Jemima Moore	Australia	32.99	
4	Patricia Ndidiamaka Nnaji	Nigeria	33.00	
	Ajara Busonga Mohammed	Ghana		DQ

==== Heat 2 ====
Rank	Name	Nationality	Time	Notes
1	Chantal Petitclerc	Canada	28.25	Q, WR
2	Zhang Ting	China	29.87	Q
3	Gunilla Wallengren	Sweden	31.23	
4	Jennifer Goeckel	United States	32.84	
5	Chen Yu Lien	Chinese Taipei	33.13	
	Dague Diop	Senegal		DQ

==== Heat 3 ====
Rank	Name	Nationality	Time	Notes
1	Manuela Schar	Switzerland	29.24	Q
2	Tatyana McFadden	United States	29.49	Q
3	Jessica Matassa	Canada	30.62	q
4	Yvonne Sehmisch	Germany	30.98	q
5	Masouda Siffi	Tunisia	33.01	
6	Gloria Sanchez	Mexico	33.43	

=== Final ===
Competed at 17:25.

Rank	Name	Nationality	Time	Notes
1st place, gold medalist(s)	Chantal Petitclerc	Canada	27.52	WR
2nd place, silver medalist(s)	Tatyana McFadden	United States	28.43	
3rd place, bronze medalist(s)	Manuela Schar	Switzerland	28.84	
4	Zhang Ting	China	29.00	
5	Jessica Matassa	Canada	30.14	
6	Yvonne Sehmisch	Germany	30.49	
7	Yazmith Bataz	Mexico	31.05	
8	Tracey Ferguson	Canada	31.66	

Q = qualified for final by place. q = qualified by time. WR = World Record. DQ = Disqualified.
