= Fédération Québecoise des Sports Cyclistes =

- Sport: cycle racing
- Abbreviation: FQSC
- Affiliation: Canadian Cycling Association

Official website
- www.fqsc.net
- (Quebec)

Fédération Québecoise des Sports Cyclistes or FQSC (the Quebec Cycling Federation) is the provincial governing body of cycle racing in Quebec, Canada.

The national governing body for Canada is the Canadian Cycling Association.
