= Erika Schmutz =

Canadian wheelchair rugby player

Personal information
- Born: 1973 (age 52–53) Windsor, Ontario, Canada
- Years active: 2005–2013
Medal record
Mixed Wheelchair Rugby
Representing Canada
2008 Summer Paralympics
Bronze medal – third place	2008 Summer Paralympics	Mixed Wheelchair Rugby

Erika Schmutz (born 1973) is a Canadian former Wheelchair rugby player and power engineer. She won a bronze medal with Team Canada in the 2008 Summer Paralympics, becoming the first woman to score a try in a Paralympic wheelchair rugby match.

== Early life ==
Schmutz was born and raised in Windsor, Ontario, and attended Kennedy Collegiate and St. Clair College, where she competed in OFSAA track and cross-country.

== Career ==
After injuring her arms and spine in a car accident in 2000, Schmutz joined the Canadian national wheelchair rugby team, becoming the third female athlete to ever be selected. Before her accident, Schmutz worked as a power engineer at Ontario Hydro. After qualifying for the 2008 Summer Paralympics, Schmutz became the first woman to score during a Paralympic wheelchair rugby competition as Canada went on to win a bronze medal. She was also the only woman playing wheelchair rugby professionally at a national level worldwide.

In 2010, Schmutz was named a top female athlete with a disability at the Ontario Sports Awards.

She was later named an alternate for the 2012 Summer Paralympics, if another player became too injured to play. Two years later, Schmutz was elected to the Board of Directors for the ON Para Network as the Wheelchair Rugby Representative, and was eventually named to Wheelchair Rugby Canada's Board of Directors.
