= Dean Bergeron =

Canadian Paralympic athlete (born 1969)

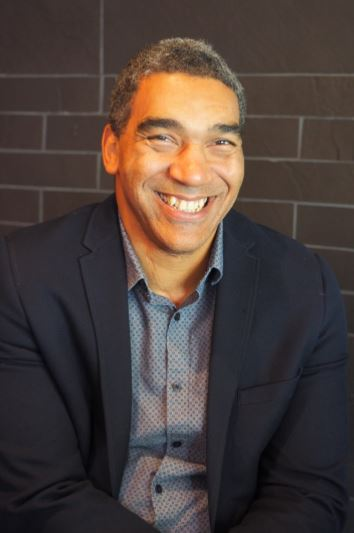
- Bergeron in 2017

Personal information
- Born: February 12, 1969 (age 57) La Baie, Quebec, Canada
Medal record
Track and field (T52)
Representing Canada
Paralympic Games
Gold medal – first place	1996 Atlanta	200m - T51
Gold medal – first place	2008 Beijing	100m - T52
Gold medal – first place	2008 Beijing	200m - T52
Silver medal – second place	1996 Atlanta	400m - T51
Silver medal – second place	1996 Atlanta	1500m - T51
Bronze medal – third place	1996 Atlanta	100m - T51
Bronze medal – third place	2000 Sydney	200m - T51
Bronze medal – third place	2000 Sydney	400m - T51
Bronze medal – third place	2004 Athens	800m - T52
Bronze medal – third place	2008 Beijing	400m - T52

Dean Bergeron (born February 12, 1969, in La Baie, Quebec (now Saguenay, Quebec) is a Paralympic athlete from Canada who competed mainly in category T52 sprint events in four Paralympic Games and is pursuing a career as an actuary.

== Biography ==
Bergeron was born in La Baie, Quebec (now Saguenay) on February 12, 1969. In 1986, at age 17, he joined the Shawinigan Cataractes of the Quebec Major Junior Hockey League to pursue professional ice hockey at the age of 17 years old. In a fistfight during a training session match in 1987, he sustained a spinal cord injury and became paraplegic. He returned to physical activity during his studies in actuarial science at Laval University.

=== Paralympian career ===
Bergeron continued in the field of athletics with wheelchair racing, also known as track and field athletics. He participated in several world championships and other international competitions presenting the event. He competed at the Atlanta 1996, Sydney 2000, Athens 2004 and Beijing 2008 Games, and recorded a total of 11 Paralympic medals.

Bergeron holds the world record in the 200m distance. He was the first athlete in his discipline to break the 400-meter distance in less than a minute (58s 54). He also holds the Canadian records for 200m, 400m, 800m and 1500m of this discipline. He was a triple medalist at the 2008 Paralympic Games (two gold and one bronze).

He has also participated in the Boston Marathons in 1999 and 2004 and the Ottawa Marathons in 2006 and 2007 in the wheelchair racing category. He won the marathon at his first participation in 1999. For the years 2004, 2006 and 2007, he finished 2nd, 7th and 2nd respectively.

==== Paralympic Games Results ====
At the 1996 Summer Paralympics in Atlanta, United States, he won a gold medal in the men's 200 metres - T51 event, a silver medal in the men's 400 metres - T51 event, a silver medal in the men's 1500 metres - T51 event and a bronze medal in the men's 100 metres - T51 event.

At the 2000 Summer Paralympics in Sydney, Australia, he won a bronze medal in the men's 200 metres - T51 event, a bronze medal in the men's 400 metres - T51 event, finished fifth in the men's 100 metres - T51 event and finished sixth in the men's 800 metres - T51 event.

At the 2004 Summer Paralympics in Athens, Greece, he won a bronze medal in the men's 800 metres - T52 event, finished fourth in the men's 200 metres - T52 event, finished fifth in the men's 400 metres - T52 event and did not finish in the men's 1500 metres - T52 event.

At the 2008 Summer Paralympics in Beijing, China, he won a gold medal in the men's 100 metres - T52 event, a gold medal in the men's 200 metres - T52 event, a bronze medal in the men's 400 metres - T52 event and finished sixth in the men's 800 metres - T52 event

==== World Championships results ====
- 2002-07: CIP World Championships (Lille/Villeneuve-d'Ascq, France)

Event: 100m Position: 2nd position Result: 18.64

- 2002-07: CIP World Championships (Lille/Villeneuve-d'Ascq, France)

Event: 400m Position: 2nd position Result:

- 2002-07: CIP World Championships (Lille/Villeneuve-d'Ascq, France)

Event: 200m Position: 3rd position Result: 35.02

- 1998-08-13: World Championships (Birmingham, United Kingdom)

Event: 200m, 800m Position: 2nd position Result:

- 1995: World Championships (Stoke Mandeville, United Kingdom)

Event: 100m Position: 1st position Result:

- 1995: World Championships (Stoke Mandeville, United Kingdom)

Event: 200m, 400m, 1500m Position: 1st position Result:

- 1994-07-30: World Championships (Berlin, Germany)

Event: 800 m Position: 1st position Result: 32.07

=== Career in insurance ===
In addition to athletics, Bergeron also pursued a career in the insurance field. Since 1993, he has been working in the field of life insurance. He has held positions as an insurance products advisor, including at Desjardins Financial Security. In June 2009, Bergeron joined La Capitale Financial Group, holding various executive positions including Director of Marketing and Health Promotion, and Senior Director of Operations. He holds the position of Vice President of Administration and Client Relations in the group insurance sector of this company.

From 2014 to 2020, Bergeron served on the Board of Directors at Praxis Spinal Cord Institute, a Canadian not-for-profit organization for spinal cord injury research and care.

== Honours ==
Bergeron was named "Male Athlete of the Year" at the Sport-Québec Gala in 2009, a title recognizing the best athlete across all sports in Quebec (Chantal Petitclerc having earned the same honor on the female side the same year). He was chosen as one of sixteen athletes to carry the Paralympic Flame at the 2010 Paralympic Winter Games of Vancouver and had the honour of lighting the olympic bowl in Quebec when the flame stopped there on December 2, 2009. Bergeron was admitted to the Parasports Quebec Hall of Fame in 2017. That same year, he was inducted into the Quebec Sports Hall of Fame. In April 2018, it was announced that the second ice rink of the Center Jean-Claude-Tremblay of The Bay would bear his name. The ice rink was one designed for the Paralympic sports sledge hockey. In June of the same year, he received the Gloire de l'Escolle medal, also named Grand Graduate Award, which is the highest distinction awarded by the Foundation of Laval University.

On December 12, 2018, Bergeron's name was given to the second ice rink of the arena of the La Baie borough of the city of Saguenay in recognition of his perseverance and athletic accomplishments.
