= Shelly Woods =

British Paralympic athlete (born 1986)

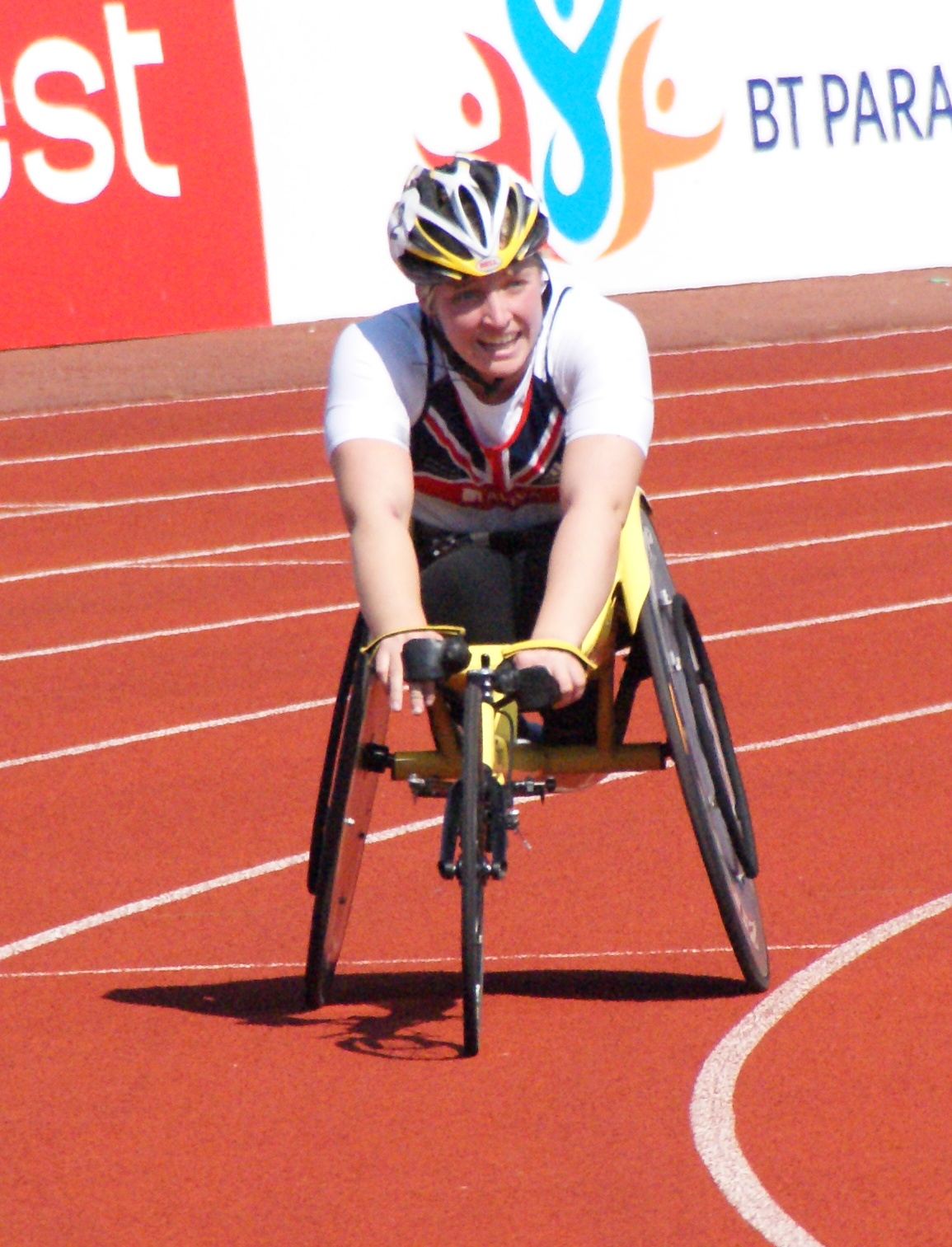
- Woods at the 2009 Paralympic World Cup in Manchester

Personal information
- Full name: Rochelle Woods
- Born: 4 June 1986 (age 40) Blackpool, England

Sport
- Country: Great Britain
- Sport: Wheelchair racing
- Disability: Paraplegia
- Disability class: T54
- Event(s): 800m, 1500m, 5000m, Marathon
Medal record
Representing Great Britain
Track and field (athletics)
Paralympic Games
Silver medal – second place	Beijing 2008	1500m T54
Silver medal – second place	London 2012	Marathon
Bronze medal – third place	Beijing 2008	5000m T54
IPC World Championships
Bronze medal – third place	2006 Assen	Marathon – T54
Bronze medal – third place	2011 Christchurch	5,000m – T54

Rochelle "Shelly" Woods (born 4 June 1986) is an elite British Paralympic athlete from the suburb of Layton in Blackpool, Lancashire. Woods is a T54 athlete who competes as a wheelchair racer in medium and long-distance events. She has competed in two Paralympic Games, Beijing in 2008 and London in 2012, where she won three medals. She is also a world-class marathon athlete, winning the women's elite wheelchair race at the 2007 and 2012 London Marathon.

== Personal history ==
Woods was born on 4 June 1986 in Blackpool. At the age of 11 Woods fell 20 feet (6.1 m) from a tree, resulting in a permanent injury to her spinal cord at the T12-L1 vertebra (paraplegia) and requiring her to use a wheelchair.

== Sporting career ==
Woods had always been a keen sportsperson, and after her injury she continued to be active in sports, including wheelchair basketball and swimming. She eventually decided to commit to athletics, stating in a 2011 interview that she made her choice to focus on racing, "because it was hardest". She was first identified as a potential throwing athlete, but switched to racing under the advice of her first coach, Andrew Gill. Gill and woods parted amicably when she was 17, as Gill believed that he had taken her as far as he could and wanted to see Woods progress under another coach. She eventually teamed up with specialist wheelchair coach, Andrew Dawes.

In 2004 Woods set the women's course record for the Reading Half Marathon, set at 66 minutes 37 seconds. As a wheelchair athlete, she has achieved considerable success having won the Great North Run in 2005, setting a new British record for the half-marathon in the process. Woods is also the national record holder over 5,000 metres and won silver medals in her very first London Marathon in 2005 and again in 2006.

On 22 April 2007, Woods won the London Marathon Women's wheelchair race for the first time in a record time of 1:50:40.

Representing Team GB at the 2008 Summer Paralympics in Beijing, Woods won a bronze medal in the 5,000 metres wheelchair final at the second time of asking. Having originally been awarded silver for coming second on 8 September, a controversial protest arising from a multiple collision (six athletes crashed) in the final straight led to the race being re-staged four days later. Woods later won a silver medal in the 1500m, finishing very strongly to beat Switzerland's Edith Hunkeler at the line, and came fourth in the marathon.

Woods also represented Team GB at the 2012 Summer Paralympics in London where she won a silver medal in the women's marathon. She came 6th in the 1500m, 8th in the 5000m and came 3rd in the heats of the 800m but failed to qualify for the final.

Woods competed in the Glasgow 2014 Commonwealth Games and finished sixth in the 1500m before going on to three fifth places finishes at the 2014 IPC Athletics European Championships in Swansea.

In September 2014, she recorded a half marathon personal best (50.36) to win the BUPA Great North Run.
