= Mendy Meenderink =

Dutch Paralympic swimmer

Personal information
- Born: 21 April 1983 (age 43)

Sport
- Country: Netherlands
- Sport: Paralympic swimming
Medal record
Women's para swimming
Representing Netherlands
Paralympic Games
Bronze medal – third place	2000 Sydney	100 m freestyle S9

Mendy Meenderink (born 21 April 1983) is a Dutch Paralympic swimmer. She represented the Netherlands at the 2000 Summer Paralympics held in Sydney, Australia and at the 2008 Summer Paralympics held in Beijing, China. She won the bronze medal in the women's 100 metre freestyle S9 event at the 2000 Summer Paralympics in Sydney, Australia.
