= Iryna Balashova =

Ukrainian Paralympic swimmer

Medal record

Swimming

Representing Ukraine

Paralympic Games
Bronze medal – third place	2008 Beijing	50 metre freestyle - S13

IPC European Championships
Gold medal – first place	2009 Reykjavik	50 m freestyle S13
Gold medal – first place	2009 Reykjavik	100 m freestyle S13
Silver medal – second place	2009 Reykjavik	100 m backstroke S13

IPC World Championships
Silver medal – second place	2010 Eindhoven	50 m freestyle S13
Bronze medal – third place	2010 Eindhoven	100 m breaststroke SB13

IPC European Championships
Gold medal – first place	Berlin 2011	50 m freestyle - S13
Silver medal – second place	Berlin 2011	100 m freestyle - S13
Silver medal – second place	Berlin 2011	200 m individual medley - SM13

Iryna Balashova (Ukrainian: Ірина Балашова; Kharkiv) is a paralympic swimmer from Ukraine competing mainly in category S13 events.

Iryna competed at the 2008 Summer Paralympics as part of the Ukrainian team. She finished in fifth in the 100 m backstroke and 100 m freestyle as well as winning bronze medal in the 50 m freestyle.
