= Andre Beaudoin =

Canadian Paralympic athlete

Medal record

Track and field (T52)

Representing Canada

Paralympic Games
Gold medal – first place	1988 Seoul	200m - 1C
Gold medal – first place	2004 Athens	200m - T52
Silver medal – second place	1988 Seoul	100m - 1C
Silver medal – second place	1988 Seoul	400m - 1C
Silver medal – second place	1992 Barcelona	100m - TW2
Silver medal – second place	1996 Atlanta	100m - T51
Silver medal – second place	1988 Seoul	100m - 1C
Silver medal – second place	2000 Sydney	200m - T52
Silver medal – second place	2004 Athens	400m - T52
Bronze medal – third place	1988 Seoul	800m - 1C
Bronze medal – third place	1992 Barcelona	200m - TW2
Bronze medal – third place	1996 Atlanta	400m - T51
Bronze medal – third place	2000 Sydney	100m - T52
Bronze medal – third place	2004 Athens	100m - T52
Bronze medal – third place	2008 Beijing	100m - T52

Andre Beaudoin is a Paralympic athlete from Canada competing mainly in category T52 sprint events.

He competed in the 1988 Summer Paralympics in Seoul, South Korea. There he won a gold medal in the men's 200 metres - 1C event, a silver medal in the men's 100 metres - 1C event, a silver medal in the men's 400 metres - 1C event and a bronze medal in the men's 800 metres - 1C event. He also competed at the 1992 Summer Paralympics in Barcelona, Spain. There he won a silver medal in the men's 100 metres - TW2 event, a bronze medal in the men's 200 metres - TW2 event, finished fourth in the men's 800 metres - TW2 event and finished tenth in the men's Marathon - TW2 event. He also competed at the 1996 Summer Paralympics in Atlanta, United States. There he won a silver medal in the men's 100 metres - T51 event, a bronze medal in the men's 400 metres - T51 event, finished fourth in the men's 200 metres - T51 event and finished sixth in the men's 1500 metres - T51 event. He also competed in the 2000 Summer Paralympics in Sydney, Australia. There he won a silver medal in the men's 200 metres - T52 event, a bronze medal in the men's 100 metres - T52 event and finished fourth in the men's 400 metres - T52 event. He also competed at the 2004 Summer Paralympics in Athens, Greece. There he won a gold medal in the men's 200 metres - T52 event, a silver medal in the men's 400 metres - T52 event, a bronze medal in the men's 100 metres - T52 event and finished fifth in the men's 800 metres - T52 event. He also competed at the 2008 Summer Paralympics in Beijing, China. There he won a bronze medal in the men's 100 metres - T52 event, finished fourth in the men's 200 metres - T52 event, finished eighth in the men's 400 metres - T52 event and finished seventh in the men's 800 metres - T52 event
