= Lauren Barwick =

Canadian Paralympic equestrian

Personal information
- Born: 12 September 1977 (age 48) Langley, British Columbia
- Height: 174 cm (5 ft 9 in)
- Weight: 61 kg (134 lb)

Sport
- Country: Canada
- Sport: Para-equestrian

Achievements and titles
- Highest world ranking: first
Medal record
Paralympic Games
Para-equestrian
Representing Canada
Gold medal – first place	2008 Beijing	Individual Freestyle – Mixed
Silver medal – second place	2008 Beijing	Individual Championship – Mixed
- Updated on 20 August 2014

Lauren Barwick (born 12 September 1977 at Langley, British Columbia) is a member of the Canadian Equestrian Team, in grade II Para-Dressage, who has competed in the 2004, 2008 and 2012 Paralympic Games. She won three medals in those games. Barwick has featured in CBC's Heartland and has several awards.

== Personal life ==
Lauren Barwick was born on 12 September 1977 in Langley, British Columbia. She worked at a place that supplied horses to movie shoots. She now lives in Reddick, Florida. She is classified as Grade II which means she is paralysed from the waist down. Before she was paraplegic, she also enjoyed cross country running and skiing. She says she dreamed of working with horses in the movies. Barwick became paralysed as a result of a ranch accident. In 2000, a 75 kg hay stack fell on her as she worked in the barn. She said, "It was an ordinary accident, but an accident that could have been prevented." After being rushed to the hospital, she was told her back was broken. Soon after, she was parasailing and riding horses again.

Barwick was featured as a stunt double on the Canadian TV series Heartland as a special guest. She always wanted to be in a film. She said, "Looking at how easy it would have been for Heartland to hire an actor to ride a horse around and pretend to be paralyzed made the experience of having me there even more special."

Lauren has 1 child named Viola.

== Career ==
This was Barwick's second appearance at the Paralympics. Her first Paralympics was in 2004 in Athens and she did not make the podium. In 2008, she won two medals, a gold in the Individual Freestyle with a score of 72.7766% and a silver in the Individual Championships. These victories were both with the horse Maile. She said, "All my friends, family, team members, and sponsors have allowed me the opportunity to succeed...But most importantly, I have had the honour to ride a horse with a lot of heart."

In the 2012 Paralympics, Barwick did not win any. She got eighth at the Open Equestrian Competition on Off to Paris with her partner Ashley Gowanlock on Maile. The pair scored 72.095% leaving them with eighth place. She was very impressed with their results. "The ring had a lot of energy, but given the circumstances, my horse went really well today," she said.

In 2014, Barwick competed at the International FEI competition in Moorsele from April 25–27. She won the Grade II freestyle and individual tests with scores of 73.086% and 79.150% respectively. She was very pleased with the results saying "Today our better was our best! The saying 'less is more' was exactly what we did, and it paid off." At the 2014 FEI World Equestrian Games, Barwick won a silver medal and a bronze medal in Individual para-dressage freestyle test grade II and Individual para-dressage championship test grade II respectively. She got a score of 76.250% for the silver and a score of 70.914% for the bronze.

== Horses ==
Barwick currently has two horses, Off to Paris and Ferdonia 2. Equine Canada's Off to Paris is a 13-year-old Oldenburg mare. She also has her own mare, Ferdonia 2, a 15-year-old Oldenburg. Off to Paris is her horse to use in international competitions provided by Equine Canada.

== Rankings ==
According to the Federation Equestre International (FEI), Barwick is ranked as the number one para-equestrian rider in the world as of 27 May 2014. The rankings were formed with results from 1 January – 30 April 2014

== Achievements ==
Barwick has been awarded 4 awards:

- Equine Canada President's Award
- Equine Canada Annual Awards
- Equine Canada Equestrian of the Year
- Top Foreign Rider Award

She has also appointed Equine Canada’s official Spokesperson for Horse Week 2009. She has also been selected as a torchbearer for the 2010 Olympic Games.

In 2015, Barwick was inducted into the Canadian Disability Hall of Fame.
