= Genevieve Ouellet =

Canadian Paralympic cyclist

Personal information
- Born: 9 July 1985 (age 41) Amos, Quebec, Canada

Sport
- Country: Canada
- Sport: Cycling
Medal record
Cycling
Representing Canada
Paralympic Games
Bronze medal – third place	2008 Beijing	Women's Road race B&VI 1–3

Genevieve Ouellet (born 9 July 1985) is a Canadian Paralympic cyclist. She has a bronze medal from the 2008 Summer Paralympics.
