= Valérie Grand'Maison =

Canadian Paralympic swimmer

Personal information
- Nationality: Canadian
- Born: October 12, 1988 (age 37) Fleurimont (Sherbrooke), Quebec
- Height: 1.64 m (5 ft 4 1/2 in)
- Weight: 64 kg (141 lb)

Sport
- Sport: Swimming
- Strokes: Freestyle; Breaststroke; Butterfly; Medley
- Club: CAMO Swim Club
Medal record
Women's swimming
Paralympic Games
Gold medal – first place	2008 Beijing	100 m butterfly S13
Gold medal – first place	2008 Beijing	100 m freestyle S13
Gold medal – first place	2008 Beijing	400 m freestyle S13
Gold medal – first place	2012 London	200 m individual medley SM13
Silver medal – second place	2008 Beijing	100m backstroke S13
Silver medal – second place	2008 Beijing	50 m freestyle S13
Silver medal – second place	2012 London	50 m freestyle S13
Silver medal – second place	2012 London	100 m freestyle S13
Bronze medal – third place	2008 Beijing	200 m individual medley SM13
IPC World Championships
Gold medal – first place	2010 Eindhoven	400m freestyle S13
Silver medal – second place	2010 Eindhoven	100m freestyle S13
Silver medal – second place	2010 Eindhoven	100m breaststroke SB13
Silver medal – second place	2010 Eindhoven	100m butterfly S13
Silver medal – second place	2010 Eindhoven	200m individual medley SM13
Bronze medal – third place	2010 Eindhoven	50m freestyle S13
Parapan American Games
Gold medal – first place	2007 Rio de Janeiro	100m freestyle S13
Gold medal – first place	2007 Rio de Janeiro	400m freestyle S13
Gold medal – first place	2007 Rio de Janeiro	100m butterfly S13
Gold medal – first place	2007 Rio de Janeiro	200m individual medley SM13
Silver medal – second place	2007 Rio de Janeiro	100m breaststroke SB13

Valérie Grand'Maison (born October 12, 1988) is a Canadian former swimmer and Paralympic champion. Over two Summer Paralympic Games she won a total of six medals setting multiple world records in Paralympic swimming.

== Biography ==
Valérie Grand'Maison started swimming at the age of seven years and started to compete competitively at the age of nine years with the swimming club CAMO of Montréal. Grand'Maison developed a condition that degrades the vision of the eyes called macular degeneration at the age of 12. By the age of 15, she had already lost most of the vision in both her eyes. Pierre Lamy, her swimming coach at the time, suggested that she get classified as an athlete who is handicapped.

At the 2005 Canada Games in Regina she qualified to be part of the Canadian Handicapped Swimming Team. She then participated at the Commonwealth Games held in Melbourne, Australia. In 2006 at the National Swimming Paralympic Championships in South Africa, she won seven medals with five of them being gold. She also established a new record for the 100 Metre free. At the 2008 Summer Paralympics Grand’Maison won six medals, with three of them being gold. One gold was for the 100 Metre Butterfly, another for the 100 Metre Free and the last for the 400 Metre Free. In addition she broke two world records.

In 2010 a right shoulder injury put her career on hold. Grand'Maison changed her swimming schedule to accommodate the injury. She was a member of the McGill University Marlets and trained under the guidance of coach Peter Carpenter.

In 2011, at the Pan-Pacific Championships in Edmonton, Grand'Maison raced the 200 m individual medley and won the gold medal. She also added three silver medals and one bronze to her collection. Grand'Maison finished second in the 50 m freestyle, 200 m freestyle and 100 m breaststroke. In addition, she won third place in the 100 m butterfly and fifth in the 100 m freestyle.

At the 2012 Summer Paralympics in London, Grand'Maison participated in the 50 m and 100 m freestyle, 100 m breakstroke and 200 m individual medley events. She won silver medals in the 50 m and 100 m freestyle (S13) and a gold medal in the 200 m medley, setting a world record.

Grand'Maison's final international competition was the 2013 IPC Swimming World Championships held in her hometown of Montreal, Canada.

== Personal life ==
Grand'Maison attended McGill University where she completed her undergraduate degree in Psychology and History. Whilst at McGill University, she was coached by Peter Carpenter until her retirement from professional swimming in 2013.

== Performance History ==
Grand'Maison has competed at a number of events around the world including World Championships and Paralympic games. She has held multiple S13 world records.

Event	Time	Competition	Country
50m Freestyle	27.88	Beijing Paralympic Games	Beijing, 2008
100m Freestyle	58.87	Beijing Paralympic Games	Beijing, 2008
200m Freestyle	2:09.86	German Open	Germany, 2008
400m Freestyle	4:28.68	Beijing Paralympic Games	Beijing, 2008
800m Freestyle	9:34.55	German Open	Germany, 2008
5000m Freestyle	1.10.36	IPC World Championships	Melbourne, 2006
50m Butterfly	30.61	German Open	Germany, 2008
100m Butterfly	1:06.49	German Open	Germany, 2008
100m Breaststroke	1:22.16	London Paralympic Games	London, 2012
50m Backstroke	33.74	Can Am Championships, Victoria, BC	Canada, 2008
100m Backstroke	1:10.58	Paralympic Trials, Montreal	Canada, 2008
200 Individual Medley	2:27.64	London Paralympic Games	London, 2012
