= Edith Wolf =

Swiss wheelchair racer (born 1972)

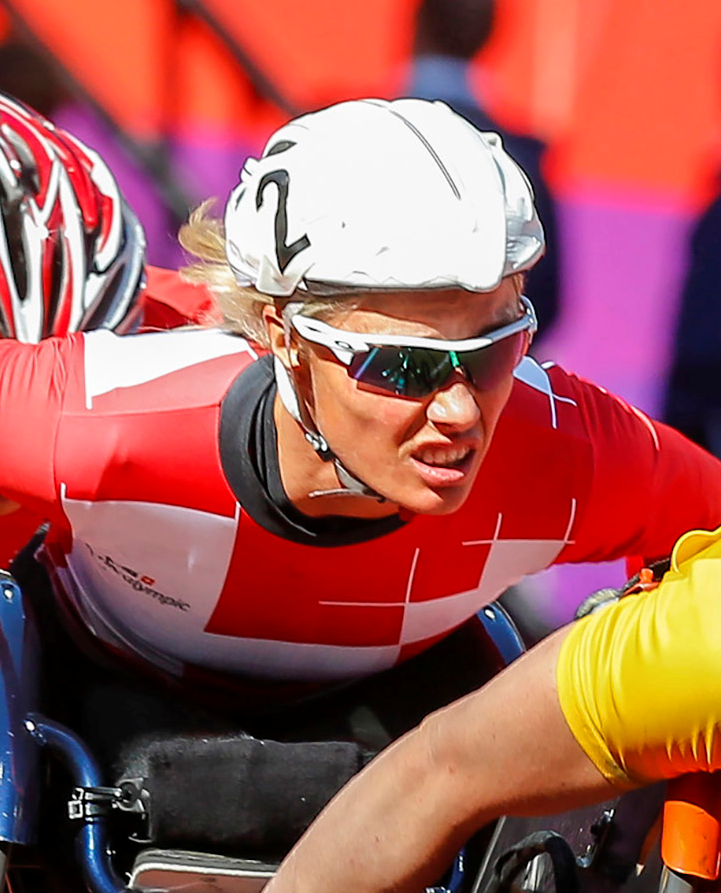
- Wolf competing at the 2012 Summer Paralympics.

Personal information
- Nationality: Swiss
- Born: Edith Hunkeler; 30 July 1972 (age 54) Altishofen, Switzerland
- Height: 168 cm (5 ft 6 in)

Sport
- Country: Switzerland
- Sport: Athletics
- Disability class: T54
- Event: Wheelchair racing
- Retired: 2015
Medal record
Representing Switzerland
Paralympic Games
Gold medal – first place	2008 Beijing	Marathon – T54
Gold medal – first place	2012 London	5000m – T54
Silver medal – second place	2004 Athens	1500m – T54
Silver medal – second place	2004 Athens	5000m – T54
Silver medal – second place	2012 London	800m – T54
Silver medal – second place	2012 London	1500m – T54
Bronze medal – third place	2008 Beijing	1500m – T54
Bronze medal – third place	2012 London	400m – T54

Edith Wolf (née Hunkeler; born 30 July 1972) is a Swiss former wheelchair racer, who competed in the T54 classification. Wolf competed at a range of distances from 400m to marathon length events and is a multiple World and Paralympic Games winner. Wolf has also eight major marathon titles to her name having won the women's wheelchair race at the Berlin Marathon (2011), Boston Marathon (2002 and 2006) and New York Marathon (2004, 2005, 2007, 2008 and 2009).

== Personal history ==
Hunkeler was in a car accident at age 22 which left her a paraplegic. She began wheelchair racing two years later.

== Athletics career ==
At the 2004 Olympic Games, she finished 6th in the demonstration sport of Women's 800m wheelchair. She also participated in the 2004 Summer Paralympics, where she won a silver medal in both the 1500 metre and 5000 metre races. At the 2008 Paralympics, she took bronze in the 1500 metres and a gold in the marathon. She advanced to the finals of the 5000 metres, but crashed and caused a pile-up shortly before the end of the race. She broke her collarbone in the accident and was disqualified from participating in the re-run of the race.

She won the women's wheelchair division of the New York City Marathon in 2004, 2005, 2007, 2008, and 2009. She was honored by New York Road Runners on November 1, 2018, during TCS New York City Marathon Race Week.
