= Diane Roy =

Canadian wheelchair racer

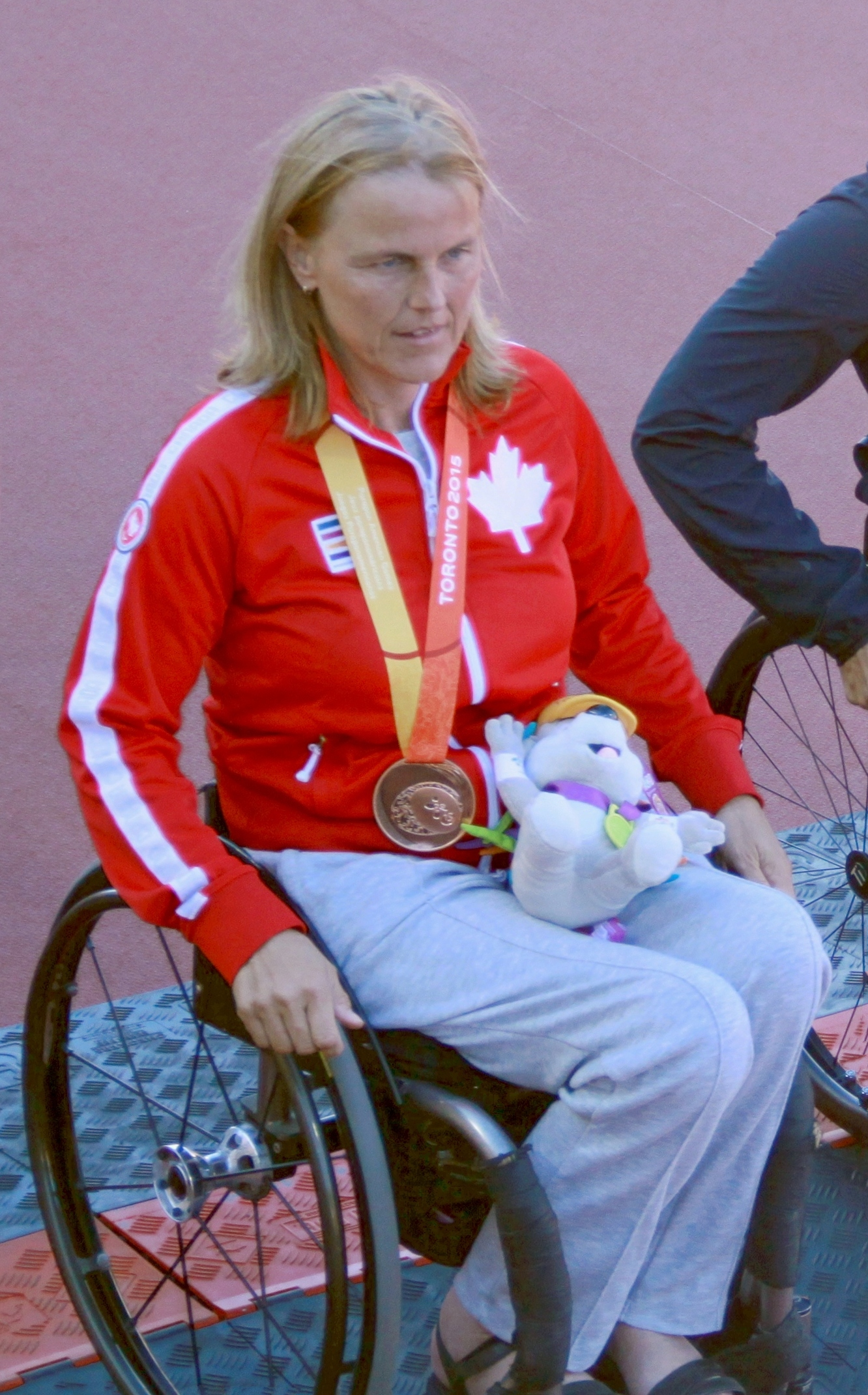
- Roy at the 2015 Parapan American Games

Personal information
- Nickname: The Warhorse
- Born: January 9, 1971 (age 55) Notre-Dame-du-Lac, Quebec, Canada
- Height: 160 cm (5 ft 3 in)
- Weight: 50 kg (110 lb)

Sport
- Sport: Paralympic athletics
- Disability class: T54
- Event: 400 m – marathon
Medal record
Representing Canada
Paralympic Games
Bronze medal – third place	2004 Athens	400 m T54
Bronze medal – third place	2004 Athens	1500 m T54
Silver medal – second place	2008 Beijing	5000 m T54
Bronze medal – third place	2008 Beijing	400 m T54
Bronze medal – third place	2008 Beijing	800 m T54
IPC Athletics World Championships
Gold medal – first place	2006 Assen	Marathon T54
Silver medal – second place	2006 Assen	1500 m T54
Bronze medal – third place	2006 Assen	5000 m T54
Silver medal – second place	2011 Christchurch	400 m T54
Silver medal – second place	2011 Christchurch	1500 m T54
Bronze medal – third place	2011 Christchurch	800 m T54
Commonwealth Games
Silver medal – second place	2014 Glasgow	1500 m T54
Bronze medal – third place	2018 Gold Coast	1500 m T54
Parapan American Games
Gold medal – first place	2015 Toronto	800 m T54
Bronze medal – third place	2015 Toronto	400 m T54

Diane Roy (born January 9, 1971) is a Canadian wheelchair racer. Between 1996 and 2016 she competed at six consecutive Paralympics and five consecutive world championships and won 11 medals, including a gold medal in the marathon at the 2006 World Championships.

== Career ==
The 2004 Summer Olympics featured a demonstration of the women's 800 m wheelchair event, in which Roy finished fourth. She also participated in the 2004 Summer Paralympics, taking a bronze medal in both the 400 metre and 1500 metre races.

At the 2008 Summer Paralympics Roy was initially awarded the gold medal in the 5000 m T54. However a re-run of the race was ordered by the International Paralympic Committee following protests by the Australian, US and Swiss teams after six competitors were involved in a crash on the penultimate lap. The re-run race resulted in the same three athletes winning medals but in a different order, with Roy placing second.

In 2009, she was inducted into the Terry Fox Hall of Fame.

== Personal life ==
Roy spent the majority of her childhood on a farm in Lac-des-Aigles, Quebec. She is the seventh of eight children, having five brothers and two sisters. Once she entered high school, Roy developed an interest in several sports, including basketball, badminton, downhill skiing, tennis, and handball in particular, which she played until her last year of high school. At age 17, an all-terrain vehicle accident left Roy with a paralyzing injury and without the use of her legs. It halted her activities temporarily.

Since about 1998 Roy works as an administrative assistant for Royal LePage. She has a son Émile.
