= Sandra Graf =

Swiss Paralympic wheelchair racer

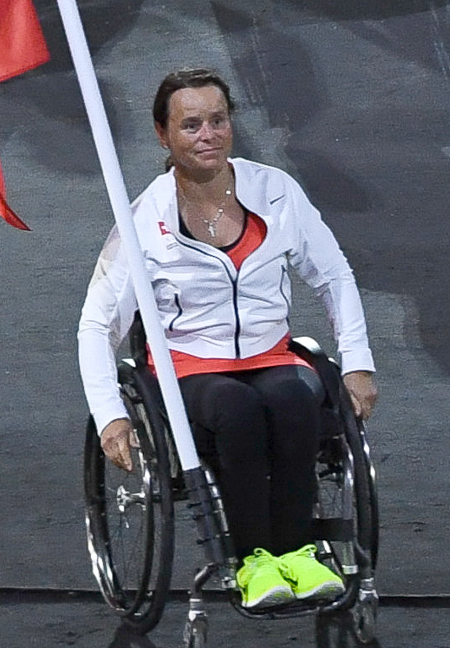
- Graf as flag bearer for Switzerland at the 2016 Summer Paralympics Parade of Nations

Personal information
- National team: Swiss

Sport
- Country: Switzerland
- Disability class: T54
- Event: Marathon
Medal record
Women's para cycling
Representing Switzerland
Paralympic Games
Gold medal – first place	2012 London	Road time trial H3
Bronze medal – third place	2008 Beijing	Marathon T54
Bronze medal – third place	2012 London	Marathon T54
- Updated on 16 September 2016

Sandra Graf (born 9 December 1969) is a Swiss wheelchair athlete. Graf competes in wheelchair races of a variety of distances.

== Life ==
Graf has twice put her career on hold to have children. In 2003 a lung embolism set back her training and kept her from competing in the marathon and 5,000-meter distances, although she still competed in the 800- and 1,500-meter races.

In 2008, during her first London Marathon wheelchair race, she both won the race over American Amanda McGrory and Briton Shelly Woods and set a new course record of 1:48:04. She has competed in five consecutive Summer Paralympics from 2000 to 2016, and won bronze medals in the marathon in 2008 and 2012. In 2012, she also won the road time trial H3 cycling event, in which she participated using a handcycle.
