= Great Britain at the 2008 Summer Paralympics =

- Flag of the United Kingdom
- IPC code: GBR
- NPC: British Paralympic Association
- Website: www.paralympics.org.uk

in Beijing
- Competitors: 212 in 18 sports
- Flag bearers: Danny Crates (opening); David Roberts (closing)
- Officials: approx. 200
- Medals Ranked 2nd: Gold 42 Silver 29 Bronze 31 Total 102

Summer Paralympics appearances (overview)
- 1960; 1964; 1968; 1972; 1976; 1980; 1984; 1988; 1992; 1996; 2000; 2004; 2008; 2012; 2016; 2020; 2024

Great Britain competed at the 2008 Summer Paralympics in Beijing, People's Republic of China. Great Britain sent a delegation of around 400, of which 212 were athletes, to compete in eighteen sports at the Games. The team was made up of athletes from the whole United Kingdom; athletes from Northern Ireland, who may elect to hold Irish citizenship under the pre-1999 article 2 of the Irish constitution, are able to be selected to represent either Great Britain or Ireland at the Paralympics. Additionally some British overseas territories compete separately from Britain in Paralympic competition.

Britain finished second in the medal table, behind host nation China, winning 42 gold medals and 102 total medals, equalling the team's position in the medal table at the 2004 Athens Games. The number of medals won was an increase on the 94 medals and 35 golds in Athens. The team was the most successful in two decades, with 80 different athletes winning at least one medal. The United Kingdom was the next host of the Summer Paralympics, holding the 2012 Games in London.

== Disability classifications ==
Every participant at the Paralympics has their disability grouped into one of five disability categories; amputation, the condition may be congenital or sustained through injury or illness; cerebral palsy; wheelchair athletes, there is often overlap between this and other categories; visual impairment, including blindness; Les autres, any physical disability that does not fall strictly under one of the other categories, for example dwarfism or multiple sclerosis. Each Paralympic sport then has its own classifications, dependent upon the specific physical demands of competition. Events are given a code, made of numbers and letters, describing the type of event and classification of the athletes competing. Some sports, such as athletics, divide athletes by both the category and severity of their disabilities, other sports, for example swimming, group competitors from different categories together, the only separation being based on the severity of the disability.

== Medallists ==
The following British competitors won medals at the games, all dates are September 2008. In the 'by discipline' sections below, medallists' names are in bold.

Medal	Name	Sport	Event	Date
Gold	Darren Kenny	Cycling	Men's individual pursuit – CP3	7th
Gold	Simon Richardson	Cycling	Men's individual 1 km time trial – LC3-4	7th
Gold	Aileen McGlynn; Ellen Hunter	Cycling	Women's individual 1 km time trial – B&VI	7th
Gold	Sascha Kindred	Swimming	Men's 200 m individual medley – SM6	7th
Gold	Anthony Kappes; Barney Storey	Cycling	Men's 1 km time trial – B&VI	8th
Gold	David Roberts	Swimming	Men's 100 m freestyle – S7	8th
Gold	Eleanor Simmonds	Swimming	Women's 100 m freestyle – S6	8th
Gold	Jody Cundy	Cycling	Men's individual 1 km time trial – LC2	9th
Gold	Darren Kenny	Cycling	Men's individual 1 km time trial – CP3	9th
Gold	Simon Richardson	Cycling	Men's individual pursuit – LC3	9th
Gold	Aileen McGlynn; Ellen Hunter	Cycling	Women's individual pursuit – B&VI	9th
Gold	Mark Bristow	Cycling	Men's individual 1 km time trial – LC1	9th
Gold	Sascha Kindred	Swimming	Men's 100 m breaststroke – SB7	9th
Gold	Anne Dunham	Equestrian	Individual championship test – Grade Ia	9th
Gold	Lee Pearson	Equestrian	Individual championship test – Grade Ib	9th
Gold	Sophie Christiansen; Anne Dunham; Simon Laurens; Lee Pearson	Equestrian	Team championship	9th
Gold	Sarah Storey	Cycling	Women's individual pursuit – LC1-2/CP 4	10th
Gold	Anthony Kappes; Barney Storey	Cycling	Men's sprint – B&VI 1–3	10th
Gold	Jody Cundy; Darren Kenny; Mark Bristow	Cycling	Men's team sprint – LC1-4\CP3/4	10th
Gold	Heather Frederiksen	Swimming	Women's 100 m backstroke – S8	10th
Gold	Matt Walker; Graham Edmunds; David Roberts; Robert Welbourn	Swimming	Men's 4×100 m freestyle – 34 points	10th
Gold	Matt Skelhon	Shooting	Mixed R3 10 m air rifle prone – SH1	11th
Gold	Helene Raynsford	Rowing	Women's single sculls – A	11th
Gold	Tom Aggar	Rowing	Men's single sculls – A	11th
Gold	David Roberts	Swimming	Men's 400 m freestyle – S7	11th
Gold	Sophie Christiansen	Equestrian	Individual freestyle test – Grade Ia	11th
Gold	Lee Pearson	Equestrian	Individual freestyle test – Grade Ib	11th
Gold	Rachel Morris	Cycling	Women's time trial – HCA/HCB/HCC	12th
Gold	David Stone	Cycling	Mixed time trial – CP1/CP2	12th
Gold	Sarah Storey	Cycling	Women's time trial – LC1-2/CP 4	12th
Gold	Dan Bentley; Nigel Murray; Zoe Robinson; David Smith	Boccia	Mixed team – BC1/BC2	12th
Gold	Sam Hynd	Swimming	Men's 400 m freestyle – S8	12th
Gold	Elizabeth Johnson	Swimming	Women's 100 m breaststroke – SB6	12th
Gold	Danielle Brown	Archery	Women's individual compound – Open	13th
Gold	John Stubbs	Archery	Men's individual compound – Open	13th
Gold	Darren Kenny	Cycling	Men's road race – CP3	13th
Gold	David Stone	Cycling	Mixed road race – CP1/CP2	13th
Gold	David Weir	Athletics	Men's 800 m – T54	13th
Gold	Peter Norfolk	Tennis	Quad singles – Open	14th
Gold	Eleanor Simmonds	Swimming	Women's 400 m freestyle – S6	14th
Gold	David Roberts	Swimming	Men's 50 m freestyle – S7	14th
Gold	David Weir	Athletics	Men's 1500 m – T54	16th
Silver	James Anderson	Swimming	Men's 200 m freestyle – S2	7th
Silver	Heather Frederiksen	Swimming	Women's 100 m freestyle – S8	8th
Silver	Louise Watkin	Swimming	Women's 100 m freestyle – S9	8th
Silver	Chris Martin	Athletics	Men's discus throw – F33/34/52	8th
Silver	Nyree Lewis	Swimming	Women's 100 m backstroke – S6	9th
Silver	Rik Waddon	Cycling	Men's 1 km time trial – CP3	9th
Silver	Sophie Christiansen	Equestrian	Individual championship test – Grade Ia	9th
Silver	Libby Clegg	Athletics	Women's 100 m – T12	9th
Silver	Nigel Murray	Boccia	Mixed individual – BC2	9th
Silver	Ben Rushgrove	Athletics	Men's 100 m – T36	9th
Silver	Jon Fox	Swimming	Men's 100 m backstroke – S7	10th
Silver	Felicity Coulthard	Equestrian	Individual freestyle test – Grade II	10th
Silver	David Weir	Athletics	Men's 400 m – T54	10th
Silver	Anne Dunham	Equestrian	Individual freestyle test – Grade Ia	11th
Silver	Ricky Balshaw	Equestrian	Individual freestyle test – Grade Ib	11th
Silver	Simon Laurens	Equestrian	Individual freestyle test – Grade III	11th
Silver	Darren Kenny	Cycling	Men's time trial – CP3	12th
Silver	Simon Richardson	Cycling	Men's time trial – LC3	12th
Silver	Heather Frederiksen	Swimming	Women's 400 m freestyle – S8	12th
Silver	Gareth Duke	Swimming	Men's 100 m breaststroke – SB6	12th
Silver	Matt Walker	Swimming	Men's 50 m butterfly – S7	13th
Silver	Matt Walker	Swimming	Men's 50 m freestyle – S7	14th
Silver	John Cavanagh	Archery	Men's individual compound – W1	14th
Silver	Stephen Miller	Athletics	Men's club throw – F32/51	15th
Silver	James Anderson	Swimming	Men's 50 m backstroke – S2	15th
Silver	Fran Williamson	Swimming	Women's 50 m backstroke – S3	15th
Silver	Robert Welbourn	Swimming	Men's 400 m freestyle – S10	15th
Silver	Mickey Bushell	Athletics	Men's 100 m – T53	16th
Silver	Shelly Woods	Athletics	Women's 1500 m – T54	16th
Bronze	Natalie Jones	Swimming	Women's 200 m individual medley – SM6	7th
Bronze	Matt Walker	Swimming	Men's 200 m individual medley – SM7	7th
Bronze	Matt Walker	Swimming	Men's 100 m freestyle – S7	8th
Bronze	James Anderson	Swimming	Men's 100 m freestyle – S2	9th
Bronze	Anthony Stephens	Swimming	Men's 200 m freestyle – S5	9th
Bronze	Claire Cashmore	Swimming	Women's 100 m breaststroke – SB8	9th
Bronze	Samuel Ingram	Judo	Men −90 kg	9th
Bronze	Louise Watkin	Swimming	Women's 100 m breaststroke – SB9	10th
Bronze	Sean Fraser	Swimming	Men's 100 m backstroke – S8	10th
Bronze	Vicki Hansford; Naomi Riches; Alastair McKean; James Morgan; Alan Sherman	Rowing	Mixed coxed four – LTA	11th
Bronze	Sam Hynd	Swimming	Men's 200 m individual medley – SM8	11th
Bronze	Heather Frederiksen	Swimming	Women's 200 m individual medley – SM8	11th
Bronze	Louise Watkin	Swimming	Women's 200 m individual medley – SM9	11th
Bronze	David Weir	Athletics	Men's 5000 m – T54	11th
Bronze†	Shelly Woods	Athletics	Women's 5000 m – T54	12th
Bronze	Matthew Whorwood	Swimming	Men's 100 m breaststroke – SB6	12th
Bronze	Mel Clarke	Archery	Women's individual compound – Open	13th
Bronze	Hazel Simpson	Athletics	Women's 200 m – T36	13th
Bronze	James Anderson	Swimming	Men's 50 m freestyle – S2	13th
Bronze	Sascha Kindred	Swimming	Men's 50 m butterfly – S6	13th
Bronze	Fran Williamson	Swimming	Women's 50 m freestyle – S3	13th
Bronze	Ian Jones	Athletics	Men's 200 m – T44	13th
Bronze	Peter Norfolk; Jamie Burdekin	Tennis	Quad doubles – Open	13th
Bronze	John McFall	Athletics	Men's 100 m – T42	14th
Bronze	Louise Watkin	Swimming	Women's 50 m freestyle – S9	14th
Bronze	Matthew Whorwood	Swimming	Men's 400 m freestyle – S6	14th
Bronze	Daniel Greaves	Athletics	Men's discus throw – F44	15th
Bronze	Natalie Jones	Swimming	Women's 50 m freestyle – S6	15th
Bronze	Great Britain national wheelchair basketball team: Joe Bestwick; Andy Blake; Simon Brown; Matt Byrne; Terry Bywater; Peter Finbow; Jon Hall; Kevin Hayes; Abdi Jama; Simon Munn; Ade Orogbemi; Jon Pollock	Basketball	Men's tournament	16th
Bronze	Ian Jones	Athletics	Men's 400 m – T44	16th
Bronze	Hazel Simpson	Athletics	Women's 100 m – T36	16th

Medals by discipline
Discipline	Gold medal	Silver medal	Bronze medal	Total
**Archery**	**2**	**1**	**1**	**4**
**Athletics**	**2**	**7**	**8**	**17**
**Wheelchair basketball**	**0**	**0**	**1**	**1**
**Boccia**	**1**	**1**	**0**	**2**
**Cycling**	**17**	**3**	**0**	**20**
**Equestrian**	**5**	**5**	**0**	**10**
Wheelchair fencing	0	0	0	0
Football five-a-side	0	0	0	0
Football seven-a-side	0	0	0	0
**Judo**	**0**	**0**	**1**	**1**
Powerlifting	0	0	0	0
**Rowing**	**2**	**0**	**1**	**3**
Wheelchair rugby	0	0	0	0
Sailing	0	0	0	0
**Shooting**	**1**	**0**	**0**	**1**
**Swimming**	**11**	**12**	**18**	**41**
Table tennis	0	0	0	0
**Wheelchair tennis**	**1**	**0**	**1**	**2**
Total	42	29	31	102

Medals by date
**Day**	**Date**	Gold medal	Silver medal	Bronze medal	Total
1	7 Sep	4	1	2	7
2	8 Sep	3	3	1	7
3	9 Sep	9	6	4	19
4	10 Sep	5	3	2	10
5	11 Sep	6	3	5	14
6	12 Sep	6	4	2	12
7	13 Sep	5	1	7	13
8	14 Sep	3	2	3	8
9	15 Sep	0	4	2	6
10	16 Sep	1	2	3	6
Total		42	29	31	102

- † Shelly Woods was initially awarded the silver medal in the athletics, women's 5000 m T54. However a re-run of the race was ordered by the International Paralympic Committee after the result was protested.

=== Multiple medallists ===
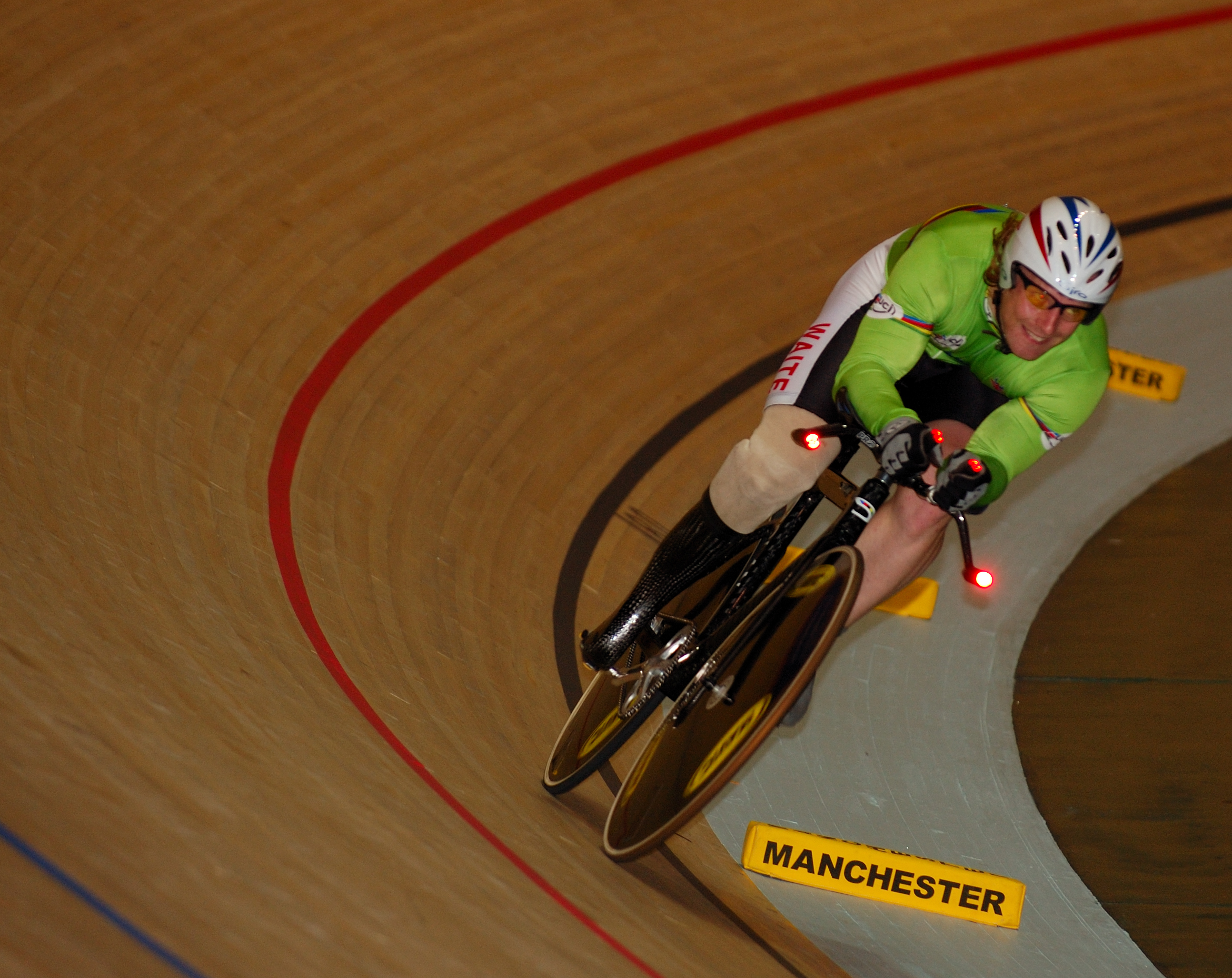
Double gold medallist Jody Cundy

The following competitors won multiple medals at the 2008 Paralympic Games.

Name	Medal	Sport	Events
Darren Kenny	Gold; Gold; Gold; Gold; Silver	Cycling	Men's individual pursuit – CP3; Men's 1 km time trial – CP3; Men's team sprint – LC1-4\CP3/4; Men's road race – CP3; Men's time trial – CP3
David Roberts	Gold; Gold; Gold; Gold	Swimming	Men's 100 m freestyle – S7; Men's 4×100 m freestyle relay – 34 points Men's 400 m freestyle – S7; Men's 50 m freestyle – S7
Lee Pearson	Gold; Gold; Gold	Equestrian	Individual championship test – Grade Ib; Team event Individual freestyle test – Grade Ib
David Weir	Gold; Gold; Silver; Bronze	Athletics	Men's 800 m – T54; Men's 1500 m – T54; Men's 400 m – T54; Men's 5000 m – T54
Sophie Christiansen	Gold; Gold; Silver	Equestrian	Team event Individual freestyle test – Grade Ia; Individual championship test – Grade Ia
Anne Dunham	Gold; Gold; Silver	Equestrian	Individual championship test – Grade Ia; Team event Individual freestyle test – Grade Ia
Simon Richardson	Gold; Gold; Silver	Cycling	Men's individual 1 km time trial – LC3-4; Men's individual pursuit – LC3; Men's time trial – LC3
Sascha Kindred	Gold; Gold; Bronze	Swimming	Men's 200 m individual medley – SM6; Men's 100 m breaststroke – SB7; Men's 50 m butterfly – S6
Mark Bristow	Gold; Gold	Cycling	Men's individual 1 km time trial – LC1; Men's team sprint – LC1-4\CP3/4
Jody Cundy	Gold; Gold	Cycling	Men's individual 1 km time trial – LC2; Men's team sprint – LC1-4\CP3/4
Ellen Hunter	Gold; Gold	Cycling	Women's individual 1 km time trial – B&VI; Women's individual pursuit – B&VI
Anthony Kappes	Gold; Gold	Cycling	Men's individual 1 km time trial – B&VI; Men's sprint – B&VI
Aileen McGlynn	Gold; Gold	Cycling	Women's individual 1 km time trial – B&VI; Women's individual pursuit – B&VI
Eleanor Simmonds	Gold; Gold	Swimming	Women's 100 m freestyle – S6; Women's 400 m freestyle – S6
David Stone	Gold; Gold	Cycling	Mixed road race – CP1/CP2; Mixed time trial – CP1/CP2
Barney Storey	Gold; Gold	Cycling	Men's individual 1 km time trial – B&VI; Men's sprint – B&VI
Sarah Storey	Gold; Gold	Cycling	Women's individual pursuit – LC1-2/CP4; Women's time trial – LC1-2/CP4
Matt Walker	Gold; Silver; Silver; Bronze; Bronze	Swimming	Men's 4×100 m freestyle relay – 34 points Men's 50 m butterfly – S7; Men's 50 m freestyle – S7; Men's 200 m individual medley – SM7; Men's 100 m freestyle – S7
Heather Frederiksen	Gold; Silver; Silver; Bronze	Swimming	Women's 100 m backstroke – S8; Women's 100 m freestyle – S8; Women's 400 m freestyle – S8; Women's 200 m individual medley – SM8
Simon Laurens	Gold; Silver	Equestrian	Team event Individual freestyle test – Grade III
Nigel Murray	Gold; Silver	Boccia	Mixed individual – BC2; Mixed team – BC1/BC2
Robert Welbourn	Gold; Silver	Swimming	Men's 4x100 m freestyle relay – 34 points Men's 400 m freestyle – S10
Sam Hynd	Gold; Bronze	Swimming	Men's 400 m freestyle – S8; Men's 200 m individual medley – SM8
Peter Norfolk	Gold; Bronze	Tennis	Quad singles – Open; Quad doubles – Open
Jim Anderson	Silver; Silver; Bronze; Bronze	Swimming	Men's 200 m freestyle – S2; Men's 50 m backstroke – S2; Men's 100 m freestyle – S2; Men's 50 m freestyle – S2
Louise Watkin	Silver; Bronze; Bronze; Bronze	Swimming	Women's 100 m freestyle – S9; Women's 100 m breaststroke – SB9; Women's 200 m individual medley – SM9; Women's 50 m freestyle – S9
Fran Williamson	Silver; Bronze	Swimming	Women's 50 m backstroke – S3; Women's 50 m freestyle – S3
Shelly Woods	Silver; Bronze	Athletics	Women's 1500 m – T54; Women's 5000 m – T54
Ian Jones	Bronze; Bronze	Athletics	Men's 200 m – T44; Men's 400 m – T44
Natalie Jones	Bronze; Bronze	Swimming	Women's 200 m individual medley – SM6; Women's 50 m freestyle – S6
Hazel Simpson	Bronze; Bronze	Athletics	Women's 200 m – T36; Women's 400 m – T36
Matthew Whorwood	Bronze; Bronze	Swimming	Men's 100 m breaststroke – SB6; Men's 400 m freestyle – S6

== Targets ==
In July 2008, UK Sport, the body responsible for the distribution of National Lottery funding to elite sport, published its expectations for the Games. It identified a 112 "stretch" medal target and expected to win 95 of them, including around 35 gold medals to finish second in the medal table.

The athletes met the expectations of UK Sport for total medals, gold medals and medal table position, finishing second behind hosts China with 42 gold and 102 total medals. The medals claimed were not all ones that had been targeted, the team fell short of targets in some sports whilst it exceeded them in others; out of the fifteen sports set a target eight succeeded in meeting them.

Sport	Athens 2004 result	"Stretch" Beijing target	Won	Target met
Archery	2	6	4	✗
Athletics	17	30	17	✗
Wheelchair basketball	1	1	1	✓
Boccia	0	2	2	✓
Cycling	7	14	20	✓
Equestrian	8	7	10	✓
Wheelchair fencing	0	0	0	–
Football five-a-side	0	0	0	–
Football seven-a-side	0	0	0	–
Judo	1	1	1	✓
Powerlifting	1	2	0	✗
Rowing	N/A	1	3	✓
Wheelchair rugby	0	1	0	✗
Sailing	0	0	0	–
Shooting	1	1	1	✓
Swimming	52	41	41	✓
Table tennis	2	4	0	✗
Wheelchair tennis	2	1	2	✓
Total	94	112	102	✗
Total expected	–	95	102	✓
Total gold	35	35	42	✓

== Archery ==
Great Britain's archery squad for the Games included twelve athletes. In all, four archery medals, two gold, one silver and one bronze, were won by British archers, which meant that they finished second in the archery medal table. John Stubbs, a former England disabled cricketer, set a new world record score of 691 in the ranking round on the route to victory in the men's individual compound open. In the equivalent women's event Danielle Brown beat compatriot, and eventual bronze medallist, Mel Clarke before going on to win the gold.

Men

Athlete	Event	Ranking round		Round of 32	Round of 16	Quarterfinals	Semi-finals	Finals	
Athlete	Event	Score	Rank	Opposition Result	Opposition Result	Opposition Result	Opposition Result	Opposition Result	Rank
Mick Beard	Ind. recurve standing	597	11	N/A	Majercuk (SLO); W 88–87	Dambadondog (MGL); L 91–104	did not advance		
Paul Browne	Ind. recurve W1/W2	576	19	N/A	Denir (TUR); W 104–90	Lee (KOR); L 103–108	did not advance		
John Cavanagh	Ind. compound W1	640	3	N/A		An (KOR); W 106–104	Fabry (USA); W 109–107	Drahoninsky (CZE); L 103–108	Silver medal
Michael Karaphillides	Ind. recurve W1/W2	520	30	N/A	Lee (KOR); L 80–105	did not advance			
Fred Stevens	Ind. compound open	681	3	Bye	Pemberton (USA); L 105–115	did not advance			
John Stubbs	Ind. compound open	691 WR	1	Bye	Bennett (USA); W 117–114	Evans (CAN); W 111–110	Horner (SUI); W 114–109	Simonelli (ITA); W 116–111	Gold medal
Mick Beard; Paul Browne; Michael Karaphillides	Team recurve	N/A			Thailand (THA); L 158–185	did not advance			

Women

Athlete	Event	Ranking round		Round of 32	Round of 16	Quarterfinals	Semi-finals	Finals	
Athlete	Event	Score	Rank	Opposition Result	Opposition Result	Opposition Result	Opposition Result	Opposition Result	Rank
Pippa Britton	Ind. compound	643	5	N/A		Clarke (GBR); L 106–110	did not advance		
Danielle Brown	Ind. compound	676 WR	1	N/A		Wang (CHN); W 107–81	Clarke (GBR); W 113–107	Kamiya (JPN); W 112–98	Gold medal
Mel Clarke	Ind. compound	674	4	N/A		Britton (GBR); W 110–106	Brown (GBR); L 107–113	Su (TUR); W 113–109	Bronze medal
Kay Lucas	Ind. recurve standing	535	15	Schett (GER); W 85–70	Gao (CHN); L 89(7)–89(9)	did not advance			
Kate Murray	Ind. recurve W1/W2	545	8	Bye	Saitoh (JPN); L 76–86	did not advance			
Kathleen Smith	Ind. recurve W1/W2	498	15	Mikhnyeva (UKR); W 83–70	Fu (CHN); L 75–97	did not advance			
Pippa Britton; Danielle Brown; Mel Clarke	Team recurve	N/A				South Korea (KOR); L 161–178	did not advance		

Legend: WR – World record; W – Won; L – Lost; N/A – Round not applicable for the event;

== Athletics ==
The GB Paralympic team included thirty–five competitors in the sport of athletics, amongst them reigning champions Kenny Churchill, Danny Crates, Daniel Greaves and Stephen Miller. David Weir failed in his attempts to win five gold medals at the Games after suffering from a virus, but did win four medals; two gold, one silver, one bronze; before pulling out of his final event.

British participants were involved in a number of controversies regarding the reallocation of medals during the Games. Shelly Woods was initially awarded the silver medal in the women's 5000 m T54, but a rerun was ordered by the International Paralympic Committee (IPC) after the Australian, US and Swiss teams protested the result because six competitors were involved in a crash on the penultimate lap. When the race was rerun Woods won the bronze medal. David Weir believed he had won the gold medal in the men's 800 m T54 but a rerun of the race was ordered after it was discovered that the Australian silver medallist, Kurt Fearnley, had begun the race in the wrong lane. Following a letter from Fearnley and the Australian authorities to the IPC, which asked that the result not be overturned in the spirit of sportsmanship, the rerun was cancelled and Weir's medal reinstated. Discus thrower Rebecca Chin was originally awarded the silver medal in the women's F37–38, but her classification was challenged and Chin was deemed ineligible for the event, stripped of her medal, and her results were erased. The decision was particularly controversial given that Chin had already been assessed earlier in the Games whilst she competed in the women's F37–38 shot put final.

Men—Track

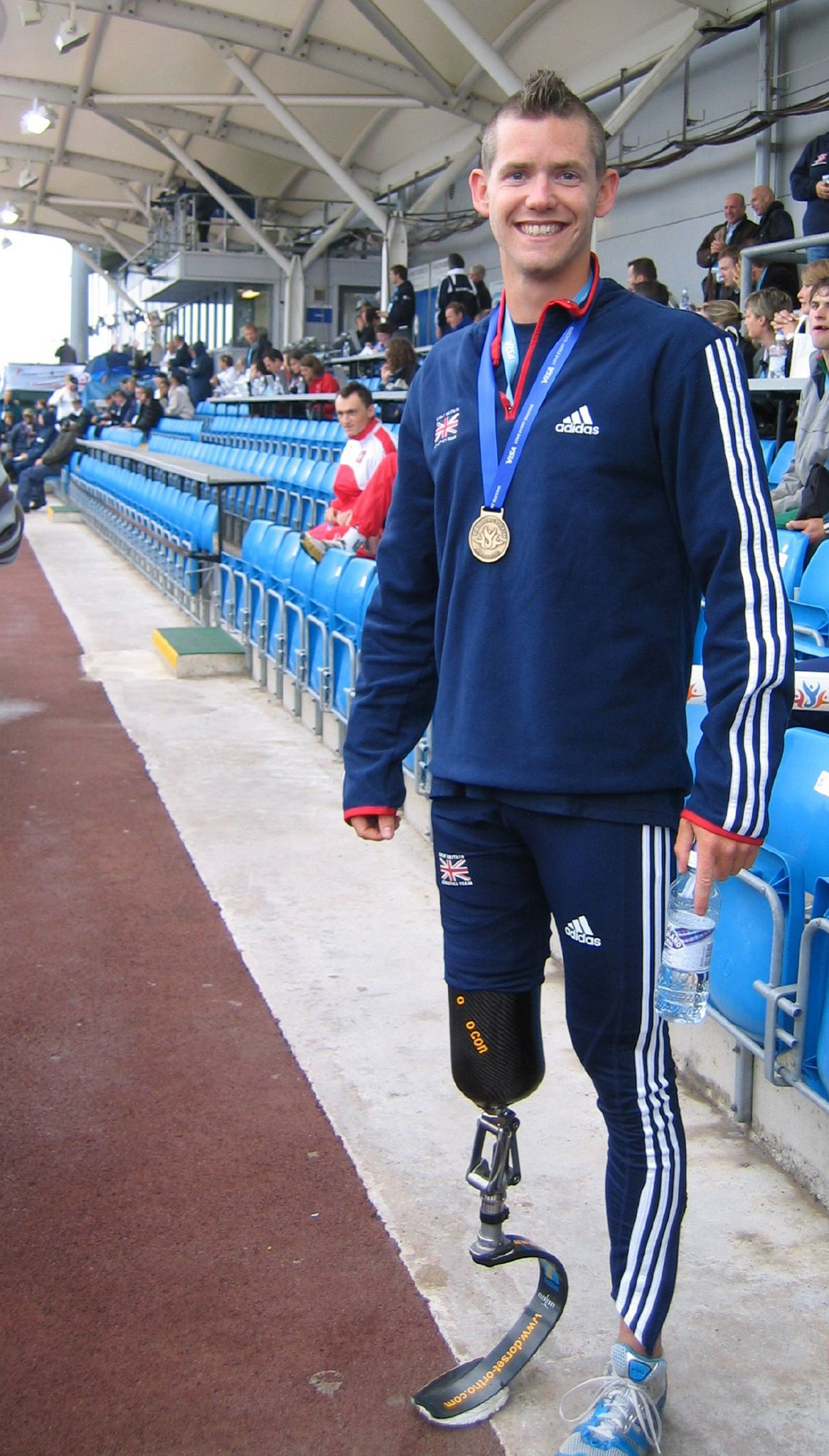
John McFall, bronze medallist in the men's 100 m T42

Athlete	Events	Heat		Semi-final		Final	
Athlete	Events	Time	Rank	Time	Rank	Time	Rank
Brian Alldis	800 m T54	1:42.38	7	N/A		did not advance	
Brian Alldis	1500 m T54	3:20.28	6	N/A		did not advance	
Brian Alldis	5000 m T54	DNF	–	N/A		did not advance	
Brian Alldis	Marathon T54	N/A				1:43:50	34
Graeme Ballard	100 m T36	N/A				12.65	8
Graeme Ballard	200 m T36	N/A				25.69	6
Graeme Ballard	400 m T36	N/A				59.22	8
Mickey Bushell	100 m T53	15.33	3 Q	N/A		14.86	Silver medal
Mickey Bushell	200 m T53	27.85	6	N/A		did not advance	
Michael Churm	100 m T37	12.55	3 Q	N/A		12.60	8
Michael Churm	200 m T37	25.30	2 Q	N/A		25.36	5
Danny Crates	800 m T46	DNS	–	N/A		did not advance	
Neil Fachie	100 m T13	11.53	5	N/A		did not advance	
Neil Fachie	200 m T13	23.17	5	N/A		did not advance	
Ian Jones	200 m T44	23.67	2 Q	N/A		23.00	Bronze medal
Ian Jones	400 m T44	N/A				51.69	Bronze medal
John McFall	100 m T42	N/A				13.08	Bronze medal
Stephen Payton	200 m T38	24.89	6	N/A		did not advance	
Stephen Payton	400 m T38	N/A				54.02	5
Ben Rushgrove	100 m T36	N/A				12.35	Silver medal
Ben Rushgrove	200 m T36	N/A				DNS	–
David Weir	400 m T54	47.26	1 Q	47.46	1 Q	46.02	Silver medal
David Weir	800 m T54	1:36.24	1 Q	1:34.27	1 Q	1:36.61	Gold medal
David Weir	1500 m T54	3:09.55	2 Q	3:10.41	2 Q	3:10.34	Gold medal
David Weir	5000 m T54	10:21.27	1 Q	N/A		10:23.03	Bronze medal
David Weir	Marathon T54	N/A				DNS	–

Men—Field

Athlete	Events	Result	Rank
Kenny Churchill	Javelin F37–38	45.30 m 941 pts	6
Martin Crutchley	Shot put F37	12.72 m 853 pts	5
David Gale	Discus F32/51	8.88 m 904 pts	11
Daniel Greaves	Discus F44	53.04 m 981 pts	Bronze medal
Chris Martin	Discus F33–34/52	28.37 m 1074 pts	Silver medal
Stephen Miller	Discus F32/51	15.44 m 887 pts	12
Stephen Miller	Club F32/51	34.37 m 1081 pts	Silver medal
Kieron Murphy	Club F32/51	29.03 m 913 pts	7
Dan Nobbs	Shot F53–54	9.13 m 940 pts	10
Richard Schabel	Discus F32/51	9.55 m 973 pts	8
Richard Schabel	Club F32/51	21.06 m 875 pts	10
Nathan Stephens	Shot put F57–58	12.57 m 937 pts	8
Nathan Stephens	Discus F57–58	38.89 m 834 pts	11
Nathan Stephens	Javelin F57–58	38.56 m 994 pts	4
Dan West	Shot put F33–34/52	10.39 m 963 pts	8
Dan West	Discus F33–34/52	37.38 m 951 pts	6

Women—Track

Athlete	Events	Heat		Semi-final		Final	
Athlete	Events	Time	Rank	Time	Rank	Time	Rank
Kate Arnold	100 m T46	14.04	9	did not advance			
Kate Arnold	200 m T46	28.83	9	N/A		did not advance	
Libby Clegg	100 m T12	12.71	1 Q	12.69	1 Q	12.51	Silver medal
Libby Clegg	200 m T12	26.42	2 Q	26.16	4	did not advance	
Katrina Hart	100 m T37	14.94	5 Q	N/A		15.12	7
Katrina Hart	200 m T37	31.24	4 Q	N/A		DNS	–
Tracey Hinton	100 m T11	13.14	2	N/A		did not advance	
Tracey Hinton	200 m T11	26.58	2 Q	N/A		26.68	4
Tracey Hinton	400 m T12	58.89	2	N/A		did not advance	
Jenny McLoughlin	100 m T37	15.42	7	N/A		did not advance	
Jenny McLoughlin	200 m T37	32.71	7	N/A		did not advance	
Hazel Simpson	100 m T36	N/A				15.40	Bronze medal
Hazel Simpson	200 m T36	N/A				32.43	Bronze medal
Shelly Woods	800 m T54	1:55.52	3 Q	N/A		1:50.03	5
Shelly Woods	1500 m T54	3:34.41	1 Q	N/A		3:40.99	Silver medal
Shelly Woods	5000 m T54	N/A				12:29.32	Bronze medal
Shelly Woods	Marathon T54	N/A				1:40:03	4

Women—Field

Athlete	Events	Result	Rank
Hollie Arnold	Javelin F42–46	29.10 m 794 pts	11
Rebecca Chin	Discus F37–38 *	DSQ	–
Rebecca Chin	Shot put F37–38	10.47 m 917 pts	10
Sophie Hancock	Discus F40	21.53 m	5
Sophie Hancock	Shot put F40	7.48 m	5
Beverley Jones	Discus F37–38	27.27 m 928 pts	7
Beverley Jones	Shot put F37–38	10.35 m 1009 pts	5
Kim Minett	Shot put F40	6.92 m	7
Gemma Prescott	Discus F32–34/51–53	11.01 m 993 pts	8
Gemma Prescott	Shot put F32–34/52–53	4.77 m 938 pts	7
Claire Williams	Discus F12–13	35.01 m 823 pts	5

* Originally awarded the silver medal but stripped of medal and results following a challenge to her classification.

Key

- DNS = Did not start
- DNF = Did not finish
- DQ = Disqualified
- PR = Paralympic record
- Q = Qualifiers for the final as decided on a basis of rank within heat
- q = Qualifiers for the final as decided on a basis of fastest losers from all heats
- WR = World record

== Wheelchair basketball ==
Britain qualified teams in both the men's and women's events. The women's team finished eighth out of ten competing teams, whilst the men, matching their achievement at 2004 Athens Games, won the bronze medal.

=== Men ===
Squad list	Group stage		Quarterfinal	Semi-final	Final (Bronze final)	
Squad list	Opposition Result	Rank	Opposition Result	Opposition Result	Opposition Result	Rank
From: Joe Bestwick; Andy Blake; Simon Brown; Matt Byrne; Terry Bywater; Peter Finbow; Jon Hall; Kevin Hayes; Abdi Jama; Simon Munn; Ade Orogbemi; Jon Pollock	China; W 81–34	3 Q	Germany; W 71–64	Australia; L 54–67	United States; W 85–77	Bronze medal
From: Joe Bestwick; Andy Blake; Simon Brown; Matt Byrne; Terry Bywater; Peter Finbow; Jon Hall; Kevin Hayes; Abdi Jama; Simon Munn; Ade Orogbemi; Jon Pollock	Australia; L 48–67	3 Q	Germany; W 71–64	Australia; L 54–67	United States; W 85–77	Bronze medal
From: Joe Bestwick; Andy Blake; Simon Brown; Matt Byrne; Terry Bywater; Peter Finbow; Jon Hall; Kevin Hayes; Abdi Jama; Simon Munn; Ade Orogbemi; Jon Pollock	United States; W 54–50	3 Q	Germany; W 71–64	Australia; L 54–67	United States; W 85–77	Bronze medal
From: Joe Bestwick; Andy Blake; Simon Brown; Matt Byrne; Terry Bywater; Peter Finbow; Jon Hall; Kevin Hayes; Abdi Jama; Simon Munn; Ade Orogbemi; Jon Pollock	Brazil; W 69–53	3 Q	Germany; W 71–64	Australia; L 54–67	United States; W 85–77	Bronze medal
From: Joe Bestwick; Andy Blake; Simon Brown; Matt Byrne; Terry Bywater; Peter Finbow; Jon Hall; Kevin Hayes; Abdi Jama; Simon Munn; Ade Orogbemi; Jon Pollock	Israel; W 82–67	3 Q	Germany; W 71–64	Australia; L 54–67	United States; W 85–77	Bronze medal

Pool B

Team	Pts	Pld	W	D	L	PF	PA	PD
United States	9	5	4	0	1	378	247	131
Great Britain	9	5	4	0	1	334	271	63
Australia	9	5	4	0	1	346	291	55
Israel	7	5	2	0	3	332	325	7
Brazil	6	5	1	0	4	291	348	−57
China	5	5	0	0	5	203	402	−199

Legend: PTS – Points; Pld – Played; W – Games won; D – Games drawn; L – Games lost; PF – Points for; PA – Points against; PD – Points difference; – Qualified for quarterfinals;

7 September
18:30

Full results

China	34–81	Great Britain
Scoring by quarter: 10–18, 6–17, 12–27, 6–19
Pts: Yang 12; Rebs: Ding 10; Asts: Chen H., Chen Q., Ding, Guo 1		Pts: Munn 19; Rebs: Munn 11; Asts: Orogbemi 4

Beijing National Indoor Stadium
Attendance: 11,797
Referees: Jonathan Blake Burford (USA)

8 September
20:45

Full results

Great Britain	48–57	Australia
Scoring by quarter: 19–19, 4–21, 12–14, 7–13
Pts: Bestwick, Munn 9 Rebs: Bestwick 8 Asts: Hall 3		Pts: Ness 16; Rebs: Ness 9 Asts: Ness 4

Beijing National Indoor Stadium
Attendance: 8,580
Referees: Edwin Frank Wallaart (Netherlands)

9 September
20:45

Full results

United States	50–54	Great Britain
Scoring by quarter: 18–14, 13–13, 8–8, 11–19
Pts: Chambers 14; Rebs: Chambers, Schulte 9 Asts: Schulte 3		Pts: Pollock 19; Rebs: Bestwick 15; Asts: Pollock 9

Beijing National Indoor Stadium
Attendance: 8,162
Referees: Rui David Marques (Brazil)

10 September
20:45

Full results

Great Britain	69–53	Brazil
Scoring by quarter: 20–10, 13–14, 14–16, 22–13
Pts: Munn 26; Rebs: Munn 21; Asts: Finbow 6		Pts: Nunes 11; Rebs: Nunes 10; Asts: Lima 4

Beijing National Indoor Stadium
Attendance: 8,201
Referees: Max Kindervater (Germany)

11 September
10:00

Full results

Israel	67–82	Great Britain
Scoring by quarter: 16–22, 10–19, 16–21, 25–20
Pts: Rozenberg 17; Rebs: Phillips 11; Asts: Rozenberg 6		Pts: Munn 25; Rebs: Munn 20; Asts: Pollock 13

Beijing Science and Technology University Gymnasium
Attendance: 1,302
Referees: Edwin Frank Wallaart (Netherlands)

Quarterfinal

13 September
16:45

Full results

Germany	64–71	Great Britain
Scoring by quarter: 17–21, 13–17, 14–20, 20–13
Pts: Kohler-Lenz 18; Rebs: Kohler-Lenz 11; Asts: Christink 5		Pts: Munn 31; Rebs: Munn 20; Asts: Pollock 8

Beijing National Indoor Stadium
Attendance: 12,000
Referees: Bill Kuerzi (USA)

Semi-final

14 September
19:00

Full results

Great Britain	54–67	Australia
Scoring by quarter: 6–19, 14–17, 13–18, 21–13
Pts: Pollock 18; Rebs: Munn 11; Asts: Pollock 3		Pts: Eveson 22; Rebs: Ness 11; Asts: Eveson 2

Beijing National Indoor Stadium
Attendance: 12,000
Referees: Juan Manuel Urunuela (Spain)

Bronze medal final

16 September
17:00

Full results

United States	77–85	Great Britain
Scoring by quarter: 14–18, 22–19, 11–24, 30–24
Pts: Chambers 25; Rebs: Chambers 6 Asts: Lade, Paye 3		Pts: Bywater 32; Rebs: Munn 13; Asts: Pollock 5

Beijing National Indoor Stadium
Attendance: 12,000
Referees: Max Kindervater (Germany)

Bronze

=== Women ===
Squad list	Group stage		Quarterfinal	Semi-final (5–8 Classification semi-final)	Final (7–8 Classification final)	
Squad list	Opposition Result	Rank	Opposition Result	Opposition Result	Opposition Result	Rank
From: Jill Fox; Helen Freeman; Joanne Harper; Paula Johnson; Caroline Maclean; Caroline Matthews; Pauline McDonald; Wendy Smith; Clare Strange; Louise Sugden; Helen Turner; Sally Wager; Ann Wild	Australia; L 30–59	4 Q	Japan; L 38–45	Netherlands; L 39–49	China; L 38–57	8
From: Jill Fox; Helen Freeman; Joanne Harper; Paula Johnson; Caroline Maclean; Caroline Matthews; Pauline McDonald; Wendy Smith; Clare Strange; Louise Sugden; Helen Turner; Sally Wager; Ann Wild	Brazil; W 61–29	4 Q	Japan; L 38–45	Netherlands; L 39–49	China; L 38–57	8
From: Jill Fox; Helen Freeman; Joanne Harper; Paula Johnson; Caroline Maclean; Caroline Matthews; Pauline McDonald; Wendy Smith; Clare Strange; Louise Sugden; Helen Turner; Sally Wager; Ann Wild	United States; L 31–56	4 Q	Japan; L 38–45	Netherlands; L 39–49	China; L 38–57	8
From: Jill Fox; Helen Freeman; Joanne Harper; Paula Johnson; Caroline Maclean; Caroline Matthews; Pauline McDonald; Wendy Smith; Clare Strange; Louise Sugden; Helen Turner; Sally Wager; Ann Wild	Germany; L 44–50	4 Q	Japan; L 38–45	Netherlands; L 39–49	China; L 38–57	8

Pool B

Team	Pts	Pld	W	D	L	PF	PA	PD
United States	8	4	4	0	0	227	149	78
Germany	7	4	3	0	1	214	174	40
Australia	6	4	2	0	2	223	185	38
Great Britain	5	4	1	0	3	166	194	−28
Brazil	4	4	0	0	4	129	257	−128

Legend: PTS – Points; Pld – Played; W – Games won; D – Games drawn; L – Games lost; PF – Points for; PA – Points against; PD – Points difference; – Qualified for quarterfinals;

7 September
10:00

Full results

Australia	59–30	Great Britain
Scoring by quarter: 24–2, 6–7, 18–4, 11–13
Pts: Crispin 16; Rebs: Crispin, Tesch 8 Asts: Tesch 4		Pts: Strange, Wager 5 Rebs: Freeman 7 Asts: Freeman, Strange 3

Beijing Science and Technology University Gymnasium
Attendance: 2,140
Referees: Bill Kuerzi (USA)

9 September
17:45

Full results

Great Britain	60–29	Brazil
Scoring by quarter: 14–5, 12–13, 18–6, 17–5
Pts: Strange 14; Rebs: Wager 13; Asts: Strange 6		Pts: Moraes 12; Rebs: Reis 8 Asts: Moraes 3

Beijing Science and Technology University Gymnasium
Attendance: 1,190
Referees: Sergio Giordano (Canada)

10 September
12:15

Full results

United States	56–31	Great Britain
Scoring by quarter: 16–7, 11–6, 16–11, 13–7
Pts: Gonzalez 14; Rebs: Gonzalez, Ruddell 6 Asts: Murray 3		Pts: Maclean 9 Rebs: Wager 7 Asts: Freeman 3

Beijing Science and Technology University Gymnasium
Attendance: 964
Referees: Ho Shuet Mei (Singapore)

11 September
11:15

Full results

Great Britain	44–50	Germany
Scoring by quarter: 8–11, 11–12, 8–15, 14–12
Pts: Strange 12; Rebs: Turner, Wager 7 Asts: Strange, Wild 3		Pts: Mohnen 16; Rebs: Mohnen 10; Asts: Butterbrodt 3

Beijing National Indoor Stadium
Attendance: 7,684
Referees: Matias Quintana (Argentina)

Quarterfinal

12 September
16:45

Full results

Japan	45–38	Great Britain
Scoring by quarter: 9–10, 5–10, 12–6, 19–12
Pts: Takubo 17; Rebs: Takubo 12; Asts: Amimoto 5		Pts: Wager 14; Rebs: Wager 10; Asts: Freeman, Strange 3

Beijing National Indoor Stadium
Attendance: 12,215
Referees: Matthew Brian Wells (Australia)

5–8 Classification semi-final

14 September
11:15

Full results

Netherlands	46–39	Great Britain
Scoring by quarter: 11–8, 12–13, 6–8, 17–10
Pts: van Oostrom 17; Rebs: Garnier 8 Asts: Corver 6		Pts: Freeman 10; Rebs: Freeman, Maclean, Turner 7 Asts: Maclean 5

Beijing National Indoor Stadium
Attendance: 12,000
Referees: Adrianos Pavlopoulos (Greece)

7–8 Classification final

15 September
13:30

Full results

China	57–38	Great Britain
Scoring by quarter: 9–15, 20–2, 12–10, 16–11
Pts: Fu 28; Rebs: Fu 14; Asts: Chen 5		Pts: Freeman 7 Rebs: Wager 6 Asts: Strange 3

Beijing National Indoor Stadium
Attendance: 12,000
Referees: Seppo Olavi Viljanen (Czech Republic)

== Boccia ==
Paralympic Boccia is open to players with cerebral palsy and other major physical disabilities. Four players were selected to compete at the Games, including Sydney gold medallist Nigel Murray. Murray advanced to the final where, despite at one stage taking a 3–1 lead, he was unable to beat Karen Hoi Ying Kwok and so won the silver medal. Murray was also a part of the four-person team that won the gold medal in the mixed BC1/BC2 event, beating the defending champions Portugal in the final.

Athlete	Event	Preliminary matches		Quarterfinals	Semi-finals	Final	
Athlete	Event	Opposition Result	Rank	Opposition Result	Opposition Result	Opposition Result	Rank
David Smith	Mixed individual BC1	Marques (POR); W 3–2 Aandalen (NOR); W 6–1; Moran (IRL); L 0–9; Sanders (NZL); L 2–5	3	did not advance			
Dan Bentley	Mixed individual BC2	Ferreira (POR); L 1–6 Kainuma (JPN); W 5–2; Leahy (IRL); W 5–1	2	did not advance			
Nigel Murray	Mixed individual BC2	Loung (CHN); W 9–1 Hirose (JPN); W 10–0; Bonner (NZL); W 17–0	1	Cordero (ESP); W 7–4	Cortez (ARG); W 4–1	Kwok (HKG); L 3–5	Silver medal
Zoe Robinson	Mixed individual BC2	Dukovich (CAN); L 2–4 Uchida (JPN); L 2–6; Ollikka (FIN); L 2–5	4	did not advance			
Dan Bentley, Nigel Murray, Zoe Robinson, David Smith	Mixed team BC1-2	Canada (CAN); W 7–6 Argentina (ARG); W 6–4	1	Norway (NOR); W 11–1	China (CHN); W 7–3	Portugal (POR); W 8–4	Gold medal

== Cycling ==
Great Britain's cycling team consisted of ten riders, including returning Paralympic gold medalists Aileen McGlynn, her tandem partner Ellen Hunter, and Darren Kenny. Former swimmers Jody Cundy and Sarah Storey were also named in the squad. The Paralympic cycling team, coached by Chris Furber and managed Helen Mortimer, trained alongside the British Olympic cycling team. Darren Kenny won five medals, four gold and one silver, more golds than any other British competitor at these Games. Cundy set a new world record and won two gold medals on the track to add to his five swimming medals from previous Games; this meant he matched Rebecca Romero's achievement in the Olympics of becoming a medal winner in two different sports. In all British cyclists won twenty medals, seventeen of them gold, to top the cycling medal tables for both road and track events.

Factor time

To ensure a fair event when athletes with differing disabilities compete, times achieved are sometimes modified by a percentage rate, to produce a result known as "Factor Time". It is this time that decides the result of the races, and is listed below. Where this differs from the actual time recorded, actual time is also listed.

=== Road ===
Athlete	Event	Time	Rank
Mark Bristow	Men's individual road race LC1/LC2/CP4	2:01:44	24
Darren Kenny	Men's individual road race LC3/LC4/CP3	1:37:00	Gold medal
Darren Kenny	Men's individual time trial CP3	37:38.42	Silver medal
Rachel Morris	Women's individual road race HC A/HC B/HC C	1:17:12	6
Rachel Morris	Women's individual time trial HC A/HC B/HC C	FT: 20:57.09; AT: 25:39.22	Gold medal
Simon Richardson	Men's individual road race LC3/LC4/CP3	1:39:14	10
Simon Richardson	Men's individual time trial LC3	38:23.73	Silver medal
David Stone	Mixed individual road race CP 1/CP 2	45:05.33	Gold medal
David Stone	Mixed individual time trial CP 1/CP 2	22:14.86	Gold medal
Sarah Storey	Women's individual time trial LC 1/LC 2/CP 4	37:16.65	Gold medal

Key

- AT = actual time
- FT = factor time

=== Track ===
Men

Athlete	Event	Heats		Quarter-finals		Semi-finals		Final	
Athlete	Event	Time	Rank	Time	Rank	Time	Rank	Time	Rank
Mark Bristow	Ind. 1 km time trial LC1	N/A						1:08.873 WR	Gold medal
Jody Cundy	Ind. 1 km time trial LC2	N/A						1:05.466 WR	Gold medal
Simon Richardson	Ind. 1 km time trial LC3–4	N/A						1:53.102 WR	Gold medal
Simon Richardson	Individual pursuit LC3–4	Garcia (ESP); W 3:48.178 WR	1 Q	N/A				Fujita (JPN); W 3:49.214	Gold medal
Rik Waddon	Ind. 1 km time trial CP3	N/A						1:11.161	Silver medal
Darren Kenny	Ind. 1 km time trial CP3	N/A						1:08.668 WR	Gold medal
Darren Kenny	Individual pursuit CP3	Ochoa (ESP); W 3.36.875 WR	1 Q	N/A				Jin (KOR); W OVL	Gold medal
Antony Kappes, Barney Storey	Tandem 1 km time trial B&VI	N/A						1:02.864 WR	Gold medal
Antony Kappes, Barney Storey	Tandem men's sprint (B&VI 1–3)	10.536	1 Q	Nattkemper, Ferrari (ARG); W 12.007; W 11.661	1 Q	Oshiro, Takahashi (JPN); W 10.747; W 11.467	1 Q	Demery, Hopkins (AUS); W 10.758; W 11.524	Gold medal
Jody Cundy, Darren Kenny, Mark Bristow	Men's team sprint (LC1-4\CP3/4)	49.561	1 Q	N/A				China; W 49.323; W 50.480	Gold medal

Women

Athlete	Event	Heats		Final	
Athlete	Event	Time	Rank	Time	Rank
Sarah Storey	Ind. 500 m time trial LC1-2/CP 4	N/A		38.356	5
Sarah Storey	Ind. Pursuit LC1-2/CP 4	Neimanas (USA); W 3:40.492 WR	2 Q	Schuble (USA); W 3:36.637 WR	Gold medal
Aileen McGlynn, Ellen Hunter	Ind. 1 km time trial B&VI	N/A		1:09.066 WR	Gold medal
Aileen McGlynn, Ellen Hunter	Individual pursuit B&VI	Parsons, Farrell (NZL); W 3:40.997	2 Q	Hou, Gallagher (AUS); W 3:39.809	Gold medal

Key

- OVL = Win by overtaking
- Q = Qualified for next round
- WR = World record

== Equestrian ==
The only equestrian events held in the Paralympic Games are in the Dressage discipline. Seven British riders competed, in both individual and team events, winning five gold and five silver medals. Lee Pearson won three titles for the third successive Games, and Anne Dunham, at the age of 59, won her first individual Paralympic Games gold medal, having previously won three team golds and been a five–time world champion.

Athlete	Horse	Event	Test round		Final round		Total	
Athlete	Horse	Event	Score	Rank	Score	Rank	Score	Rank
Ricky Balshaw	Deacons Giorgi	Ind. champ. test grade Ib	N/A				64.953	5
Ricky Balshaw	Deacons Giorgi	Ind. freestyle test grade Ib	N/A				70.444	Silver medal
Sophie Christiansen	Lambrusco III	Ind. champ. test grade Ia	N/A				72.800	Silver medal
Sophie Christiansen	Lambrusco III	Ind. freestyle test grade Ia	N/A				76.166	Gold medal
Felicity Coulthard	Roffelaar	Ind. champ. test grade II	N/A				65.546	6
Felicity Coulthard	Roffelaar	Ind. freestyle test grade II	N/A				71.056	Silver medal
Debbie Criddle	Pavaroti	Ind. champ. test grade III	N/A				68.160	5
Debbie Criddle	Pavaroti	Ind. freestyle test grade III	N/A				73.110	4
Anne Dunham	Teddy	Ind. champ. test grade Ia	N/A				73.100	Gold medal
Anne Dunham	Teddy	Ind. freestyle test grade Ia	N/A				73.333	Silver medal
Simon Laurens	Ocean Diamond	Ind. champ. test grade III	N/A				62.88	8
Simon Laurens	Ocean Diamond	Ind. freestyle test grade III	N/A				73.499	Silver medal
Lee Pearson	Gentlemen	Ind. champ. test grade Ib	N/A				73.238	Gold medal
Lee Pearson	Gentlemen	Ind. freestyle test grade Ib	N/A				77.057	Gold medal
Simon Laurens; Sophie Christiansen; Lee Pearson; Anne Dunham	Ocean Diamond; Lambrusco III; Gentlemen; Teddy	team event	220.470; 69.538; 72.000; 73.294; 75.176	1	219.138; 62.880; 72.800; 73.238; 73.100	1	439.608	Gold medal

== Wheelchair fencing ==
Lee Fawcett was the sole British fencer to qualify for the Games, he competed in both the foil and sabre B classification events. Fawcett was the final British athlete to compete in Beijing, losing his sabre round of 16 match to Serhiy Shenkevych of Ukraine.

Athlete	Event	Pool matches		Round of 16	Quarterfinals	Semi-finals	Final	
Athlete	Event	Opposition Result	Rank	Opposition Result	Opposition Result	Opposition Result	Opposition Result	Rank
Lee Fawcett	Men's ind. foil cat. B	Rodgers (USA); L 0–5 Alsaedi (KUW); L 2–5; Czop (POL); W 5–4; Datsko (UKR); L 1–5; Francois (FRA); L 1–5	5	did not advance				
Lee Fawcett	Men's ind. sabre cat. B	Francois (FRA); L 0–5 Arnau (ESP); W 5–0; Shenkevych (UKR); L 3–5; Szekeres (HUN); L 3–5; Mainville (CAN); W 5–3	4	Shenkevych (UKR); L 4–15	did not advance			

== Football five-a-side ==
The sport is classified as a B1 event, meaning that it is for blind athletes, however vision-impaired athletes are also able to take part as all competitors wear eyeshades to ensure they are equally disadvantaged. Goalkeepers may be sighted as long as they have not been registered with FIFA since 2003. Each team may also have a guide behind their opponents' goal to direct players.

Great Britain qualified through the International Blind Sports Federation European Championships, held in Greece in 2007, where the team won the silver medal. It was the first time Britain was represented in this sport at the Paralympics. The team finished fifth out of the six teams that competed, having beaten South Korea on penalties in the fifth and sixth place classification match.

Preliminaries

Squad list	Group stage		Final (5–6 Classification)	
Squad list	Opposition Result	Rank	Opposition Result	Rank
From: Ajmal Ahmed; Andrew Briant; David Clarke; Lee Greatbatch; Jonathan Gribbin; Simon Hill; William Norman; Keryn Seal; Jonathan Pugh (sighted goalkeeper); Daniel James (sighted goalkeeper)	China; L 0–3	5	South Korea; W 1–1 (PSO 1–0)	5
From: Ajmal Ahmed; Andrew Briant; David Clarke; Lee Greatbatch; Jonathan Gribbin; Simon Hill; William Norman; Keryn Seal; Jonathan Pugh (sighted goalkeeper); Daniel James (sighted goalkeeper)	South Korea; W 2–1	5	South Korea; W 1–1 (PSO 1–0)	5
From: Ajmal Ahmed; Andrew Briant; David Clarke; Lee Greatbatch; Jonathan Gribbin; Simon Hill; William Norman; Keryn Seal; Jonathan Pugh (sighted goalkeeper); Daniel James (sighted goalkeeper)	Spain; L 1–3	5	South Korea; W 1–1 (PSO 1–0)	5
From: Ajmal Ahmed; Andrew Briant; David Clarke; Lee Greatbatch; Jonathan Gribbin; Simon Hill; William Norman; Keryn Seal; Jonathan Pugh (sighted goalkeeper); Daniel James (sighted goalkeeper)	Brazil; L 0–5	5	South Korea; W 1–1 (PSO 1–0)	5
From: Ajmal Ahmed; Andrew Briant; David Clarke; Lee Greatbatch; Jonathan Gribbin; Simon Hill; William Norman; Keryn Seal; Jonathan Pugh (sighted goalkeeper); Daniel James (sighted goalkeeper)	Argentina; L 1–3	5	South Korea; W 1–1 (PSO 1–0)	5

Team	Pts	Pld	W	D	L	GF	GA	GD
China	13	5	4	1	0	7	1	+6
Brazil	11	5	3	2	0	10	1	+9
Argentina	10	5	3	1	1	7	2	+5
Spain	4	5	1	1	3	5	7	−2
Great Britain	3	5	1	0	4	4	15	−11
South Korea	1	5	0	1	4	3	10	−7

Legend: PTS – Points; Pld – Played; W – Games won; D – Games drawn; L – Games lost; GF – Goals for; GA – Goals against; GD – Goal difference; – Qualification for gold medal match; – Qualification for bronze medal match;

7 September
11:30

China	3–0	Great Britain
Wang Yafeng (2); Chen Shanyong

Olympic Green Hockey Field
Attendance: 1,259
Referee: Ilias Mastoras (Greece)
9 September
9:00

South Korea	1–2	Great Britain
Hur Suk		David Clarke; Jonathan Gribbin

Olympic Green Hockey Field
Attendance: 1,321
Referee: Nelson Luis Glock (Brazil)
11 September
13:00

Great Britain	1–3	Spain
David Clarke		Alfredo Cuadrado; Marcelo Rosado; Antonio Jesus Martin

Olympic Green Hockey Field
Attendance: 2,021
Referee: Nelson Luis Glock (Brazil)
13 September
11:00

Great Britain	0–5	Brazil
		Joao Batista Silva; Mizael Oliveira; Ajmal Maqsood Ahmed (O.G.); Ricardo Alves (2)

Olympic Green Hockey Field
Attendance: 1,277
Referee: Ilias Mastoras (Greece)
15 September
9:00

Argentina	3–1	Great Britain
Silvio Vela (2); Ivan Figueroa		Lee Greatbatch

Olympic Green Hockey Field
Attendance: 1,117
Referee: Ilias Mastoras (Greece)

5–6 Classification

17 September
9:00

Great Britain	1–1	South Korea
David Clarke		Oh Yong-Kyun
Penalties
Seal (penalty missed); Clarke (penalty scored)	1–0	(penalty missed) Kim K-H; (penalty missed) Kim J-H; (penalty missed) Park M-S

Olympic Green Hockey Field
Attendance: 1,057
Referee: Ricardo Torino (Argentina)

== Football seven-a-side ==
7-a-side football is for people with cerebral palsy only, so athletes who classify as CP5-CP8 can take part in this sport, with C5 being most disabled. At least one C5 or C6 player, and no more than three C8 players, may be on the field at a given time. Britain qualified a team in this sport through the 7th-place finish of the England team at the CPISRA World Championships in Brazil.; their first appearance since the 1992 Barcelona Games

Pool B

Squad list	Group stage		Semi-final (5–8 Classification round)	Final (7–8 Classification final)	
Squad list	Opposition Result	Rank	Opposition Result	Opposition Result	Rank
From: Michael Barker; Matthew Ellis; Richard Fox; Junior Gordon; Keiran Martin; Graeme Paterson; Jonathan Paterson; Jordan Raynes; Mark Robertson; Leon Taylor; Michael Wilson	Ukraine; L 1–8	4	Netherlands; L 2–4	China; W 10–2	7
From: Michael Barker; Matthew Ellis; Richard Fox; Junior Gordon; Keiran Martin; Graeme Paterson; Jonathan Paterson; Jordan Raynes; Mark Robertson; Leon Taylor; Michael Wilson	Iran; L 0–3	4	Netherlands; L 2–4	China; W 10–2	7
From: Michael Barker; Matthew Ellis; Richard Fox; Junior Gordon; Keiran Martin; Graeme Paterson; Jonathan Paterson; Jordan Raynes; Mark Robertson; Leon Taylor; Michael Wilson	Ireland; D 1–1	4	Netherlands; L 2–4	China; W 10–2	7

Team	P	W	D	L	GF	GA	GD	Score
Ukraine	3	3	0	0	19	1	18	9
Iran	3	2	0	1	7	6	1	6
Ireland	3	0	1	2	3	12	−9	1
Great Britain	3	0	1	2	2	12	−10	1

Legend: PTS – Points; Pld – Played; W – Games won; D – Games drawn; L – Games lost; GF – Goals for; GA – Goals against; GD – Goal difference; – Qualified for semi-finals; – Advanced to 5–8 Classification semi-final;

8 September
15:45

Ukraine	8–1	Great Britain
Ivan Shkvarlo (3); Taras Dutko (2); Denis Ponomaryov; Vol Antonyuk; Anatolii Shevchyk		Matthew Dimbylow

Olympic Green Hockey Field
Attendance: 5,141
Referee: Kou Yadong (China)
10 September
9:00

Iran	3–0	Great Britain
Moslem Akbari; Abdolreza Karimzadeh (2)

Olympic Green Hockey Field
Attendance: 5,500
Referee: Yang Lingyu (China)
12 September
15:45

Great Britain	1–1	Ireland
Michael Barker		Joseph Markey

Olympic Green Hockey Field
Attendance: 11,365
Referee: Deng Qiang (China)

5–8 Classification semi-final

14 September
9:00

Netherlands	4–2	Great Britain
Johannes Straatman (2); Stephan Lokhoff; Joey Mense	(Report)	Matthew Dimbylow; Matthew Ellis

Olympic Green Hockey Field
Attendance: 6,312
Referee: Fang Aijun (China)

7–8 Classification final

16 September
9:00

Great Britain	10–2	China
Matthew Dimbylow; Michael Barker (4); Mark Robertson; Roy Gordon; Graeme Paterson; Matthew Ellis; Jonathan Paterson	(Report)	Fan Zhichao (2)

Olympic Green Hockey Field A
Attendance: 4,235
Referee: Fang Aijun (China)

== Judo ==
Four British judokas qualified for the Games, all events were for visually impaired athletes. A single medal was won, by Sam Ingram, in the men's 90 kg category.

Athlete	Event	Round of 16	Quarterfinals	Semi-finals	Final	Repechage 1	Repechage 2	Bronze	
Athlete	Event	Opposition Result	Opposition Result	Opposition Result	Opposition Result	Opposition Result	Opposition Result	Opposition Result	Rank
Darren Harris	Men's 66 kg	Sanchez (CUB); L 0000–1001	did not advance			Falcon (VEN); L 0001–0120	did not advance		
Sam Ingram	Men's 90 kg	Sevricou (FRA); L 0011–0021	did not advance			Hatsuse (JPN); W 1000–0000	Yunks (GER); W 0110–0010	Nine (ALG); W WDL	Bronze medal
Ben Quilter	Men's 60 kg	Bye	Li (CHN); L 0000–0001	did not advance		Araujo (BRA); W 1010–0000	Perez (CUB); W 1000–0000	Ibrahimov (AZE); L 0000–1000	N/A
Ian Rose	Men's 100 kg	Hiroshi (JPN); L 0001–0002	did not advance						

- WDL Withdrawal

== Powerlifting ==
Four British powerlifters qualified to compete at the Games. Jason Irving and Natalie Blake had the best results, each finishing sixth, Blake was competing in the −48 kg division, having dropped down two weight categories since her fourth-place finish in Athens.

Athlete	Event	Total lifted	Rank
Natalie Blake	Women's −48 kg	97.5 kg	6
Jason Irving	Men's −56 kg	177.5 kg	6
Ali Jawad	Men's −75 kg	182.5 kg	9
Anthony Peddle	Men's −48 kg	No weight lifted	N/A

== Rowing ==
Rowing appeared as a Paralympic sport for the first time at the 2008 games. Briton Helene Raynsford became the first ever Paralympic champion in the sport, winning the women's single sculls. Tom Aggar matched her success with victory in the men's single sculls. A bronze medal for the mixed coxed four crew meant that GB won more medals in the sport than any other nation and topped the rowing medal table.

Athlete(s)	Event	Heats		Repechage		Final	
Athlete(s)	Event	Time	Rank	Time	Rank	Time	Rank
Tom Aggar	Men's single sculls	5:12.25	1 Q	N/A		5:22.09	Gold medal
Helene Raynsford	Women's single sculls	5:38.44	1 WB Q	N/A		6:12.93	Gold medal
Karen Cromie; James Roberts	Mixed double sculls	4:25.73	3 R	4:41.74	2 Q	4:32.52	5
Vicki Hansford; Naomi Riches; Alastair McKean; James Morgan; Alan Sherman	Mixed coxed four	3:36.81	2 R	3:44.90	1 Q	3:38.37	Bronze medal

Key

- Q = Qualified for final
- R = Qualified for repechage
- WB = World best time

== Wheelchair rugby ==
At the Paralympics teams in the sport of wheelchair rugby are made up of mixed classification tetraplegic athletes of both sexes. Great Britain qualified via the Europe Zonal Championship and went on to finish fourth out of eight teams, losing the bronze medal playoff to Canada.

Squad list	Group stage		Semi-final (classification round)	Final (bronze final)	
Squad list	Opposition Result	Rank	Opposition Result	Opposition Result	Rank
From: Alan Ash; Andy Barrow; Jonathan Coggan; Troye Collins; Justin Frishberg; Bulbul Hussain; Ross Morrison; Steve Palmer; Josie Pearson; Jason Roberts; Mandip Sehmi; Paul Shaw	New Zealand; W 39–38	2	United States; L 32–35	Canada; L 41–47	4
From: Alan Ash; Andy Barrow; Jonathan Coggan; Troye Collins; Justin Frishberg; Bulbul Hussain; Ross Morrison; Steve Palmer; Josie Pearson; Jason Roberts; Mandip Sehmi; Paul Shaw	Germany; W 39–35	2	United States; L 32–35	Canada; L 41–47	4
From: Alan Ash; Andy Barrow; Jonathan Coggan; Troye Collins; Justin Frishberg; Bulbul Hussain; Ross Morrison; Steve Palmer; Josie Pearson; Jason Roberts; Mandip Sehmi; Paul Shaw	Australia; L 37–43	2	United States; L 32–35	Canada; L 41–47	4

Pool B

Team	P	W	D	L	G	GA	GD	Score
Australia	3	3	0	0	129	111	18	6
Great Britain	3	2	0	1	115	116	−1	4
New Zealand	3	1	0	2	116	109	7	2
Germany	3	0	0	3	102	126	−24	0

== Sailing ==
Great Britain entered crews in all three of the sailing events, held in the Qingdao International Sailing Centre. All three boats finished in the top ten places of their events, but none were in the medal positions.

Athlete	Event	Race											Total points	Rank
Athlete	Event	1	2	3	4	5	6	7	8	9	10	11	Total points	Rank
Helena Lucas	2.4 mR – 1 person keelboat	(10)	5	7	7	3	4	(12)	2	8	5	CAN	41	7
Niki Birrell; Alexandra Rickham	SKUD18 – 2 person keelboat	5	5	(8)	(8)	4	1	4	7	7	4	CAN	37	5
John Robertson; Stephen Thomas; Hannah Stodel	Sonar – 3 person keelboat	(9)	3	6	(9)	5	7	8	6	3	2	1	41	6

Key

- (#) = Worst two results discarded
- CAN = Race cancelled

== Shooting ==
British shooters won a single medal at the Games, a gold for Matt Skelhon in the mixed R3–10 m air rifle prone SH1. With his first six shots in the qualification round he equalled the world record with a perfect score of 600 out of 600. Of the other six events in which there was a British competitor only Nathan Milgate, in the men's R1-10 m air rifle standing SH1, advanced to the final.

Rifle

Athlete	Event	Qualification		Final	
Athlete	Event	Score	Rank	Score	Rank
James Bevis	Mixed R5–10 m air rifle prone SH2	594	19	did not advance	
James Bevis	Mixed R4–10 m air rifle standing SH2	589	19	did not advance	
Di Coates	Women's R2–10 m air rifle standing SH1	385	10	did not advance	
Nathan Milgate	Men's R1-10 m air rifle standing SH1	587	7	686.9	8
Nathan Milgate	Mixed R3–10 m air rifle prone SH1	599	12	did not advance	
Matt Skelhon	Men's R1–10 m air rifle standing SH1	578	18	did not advance	
Matt Skelhon	Mixed R3–10 m air rifle prone SH1	600 =WR	1=	704.9	Gold medal

== Swimming ==
British Swimming selected a squad of 35 athletes to send to Beijing to compete in the swimming events. The team contributed a total of forty-one medals to the ParalympicsGB medal total – eleven gold, twelve silver and eighteen bronze. David Roberts won gold in each of his three individual and one of his relay events, taking his personal Paralympics gold medal haul to eleven, equalling that of Dame Tanni Grey-Thompson. Heather Frederiksen won four medals, including gold in the 100 m backstroke S8 where she set a new world record time, and Matt Walker, competing in his third Paralympics, won four individual silver and bronze medals and a gold in the 4 × 100 m freestyle relay, whilst James Anderson competed in his fifth Paralympics, taking his individual medal total to 17. Thirteen-year-old Eleanor Simmonds, the youngest of all the British athletes in Beijing, won two gold medals, making her Britains youngest ever individual Paralympic medallist.

Men

Athlete	Events	Heats		Final	
Athlete	Events	Time	Rank	Time	Rank
James Anderson	50 m freestyle S2	1:10.73	2 Q	1:06.09	Bronze medal
James Anderson	100 m freestyle S2	2:26.23	2 Q	2:24.32	Bronze medal
James Anderson	200 m freestyle S2	5:13.20	3 Q	5:00.03	Silver medal
James Anderson	50 m backstroke S2	1:05.56	1 Q	1:04.33	Silver medal
Gareth Duke	100 m breaststroke SB6	1:31.54	2 Q	1:28.20	Silver medal
Graham Edmunds	50 m freestyle S10	25.10	5 Q	25.11	8
Graham Edmunds	100 m freestyle S10	55.64	8 Q	55.63	7
David Ellis	50 m freestyle S13	26.46	14	did not advance	
David Ellis	100 m freestyle S13	58.72	13	did not advance	
David Ellis	100 m backstroke S13	1:11.41	11	did not advance	
David Ellis	100 m butterfly S13	1:03.58	13	did not advance	
David Ellis	100 m breaststroke SB13	1:10.92	6 Q	1:09.81	7
David Ellis	200 m individual medley SM13	2:20.27	2 Q	2:21.22	6
Jonathan Fox	50 m freestyle S7	31.17	=6 Q	31.53	8
Jonathan Fox	100 m freestyle S7	1:08.16	5 Q	1:08.82	5
Jonathan Fox	400 m freestyle S7	4:31.78	9	did not advance	
Jonathan Fox	100 m backstroke S7	1:14.78	2 Q	1:14.34	Silver medal
Sean Fraser	50 m freestyle S8	29.08	9	did not advance	
Sean Fraser	100 m freestyle S8	1:02.45	10	did not advance	
Sean Fraser	100 m backstroke S8	1:10.77	3 Q	1:11.28	Bronze medal
Sean Fraser	100 m butterfly S8	1:07.42	7 Q	1:08.36	8
Sam Hynd	50 m freestyle S8	29.27	11	did not advance	
Sam Hynd	100 m freestyle S8	1:01.67	7 Q	1:01.04	6
Sam Hynd	400 m freestyle S8	4:26.46 WR	1 Q	4:26.25 WR	Gold medal
Sam Hynd	100 m breaststroke SB8	1:17.00	5 Q	1:15.29	5
Sam Hynd	200 m individual medley SM8	2:31.96	2 Q	2:29.93	Bronze medal
Sascha Kindred	50 m freestyle S6	33.04	9	did not advance	
Sascha Kindred	50 m butterfly S6	33.12	3 Q	32.49	Bronze medal
Sascha Kindred	100 m breaststroke SB7	1:23.31	1 Q	1:22.18 WR	Gold medal
Sascha Kindred	200 m individual medley SM6	2:48.35 PR	1 Q	2:42.19 WR	Gold medal
Dervis Konuralp	100 m butterfly S13	1:02.91	9	did not advance	
Dervis Konuralp	100 m breaststroke SB13	1:14.55	11	did not advance	
Dervis Konuralp	200 m individual medley SM13	2:24.03	6 Q	2:23.01	7
Andrew Lindsay	400 m freestyle S7	5:06.31	3 Q	5:02.74	5
Andrew Lindsay	100 m backstroke S7	1:16.75	4 Q	1:15.99	4
Simon Miller	50 m freestyle S9	27.41	15	did not advance	
Simon Miller	100 m freestyle S9	59.08	14	did not advance	
David Roberts	50 m freestyle S7	28.33 PR	1 Q	27.95 PR	Gold medal
David Roberts	100 m freestyle S7	1:00.82 PR	1 Q	1:00.35 PR	Gold medal
David Roberts	400 m freestyle S7	5:04.31	1 Q	4:52.35 WR	Gold medal
Anthony Stephens	50 m freestyle S5	35.82	7 Q	34.97	6
Anthony Stephens	100 m freestyle S5	1:19.10	6 Q	1:16.07	4
Anthony Stephens	200 m freestyle S5	N/A		2:44.67	Bronze medal
Anthony Stephens	50 m backstroke S5	43.24	6 Q	DQ	–
Matthew Walker	50 m freestyle S7	28.75	2 Q	28.60	Silver medal
Matthew Walker	100 m freestyle S7	1:05.49	3 Q	1:04.17	Bronze medal
Matthew Walker	50 m butterfly S7	32.49	2 Q	32.24	Silver medal
Matthew Walker	200 m individual medley SM7	2:54.30	4 Q	2:50.10	Bronze medal
Robert Welbourn	100 m freestyle S10	54.57	3 Q	54.40	4
Robert Welbourn	400 m freestyle S10	4:18.19	1 Q	4:07.61	Silver medal
Robert Welbourn	100 m butterfly S10	1:03.41	12	did not advance	
Robert Welbourn	200 m individual medley SM10	2:21.25	7 Q	2:19.91	7
Matthew Whorwood	50 m freestyle S6	34.94	11	did not advance	
Matthew Whorwood	100 m freestyle S6	1:12.51	8 Q	1:11.62	6
Matthew Whorwood	400 m freestyle S6	5:20.03	3 Q	5:20.45	Bronze medal
Matthew Whorwood	100 m breaststroke SB6	1:30.52	1 Q	1:29.96	Bronze medal
Matthew Whorwood	200 m individual medley SM6	2:54.00	4 Q	2:55.06	4
Matt Walker, Graham Edmunds, David Roberts, Robert Welbourn	4×100 m freestyle relay 34 pts	N/A		3:51.43 WR	Gold medal
From: Graham Edmunds, Sean Fraser, Sam Hynd, David Roberts, Robert Welbourn	4×100 m medley relay 34 pts	4:34.17; Fraser, Hynd, Edmunds, Roberts	7 Q	4:28.45; Fraser, Hynd, Welbourn, Roberts	5

Legend: Q – Qualifiers for the next round as decided on a time only basis. Ranks shown are overall rank against competitors in all heats; DQ – Disqualified; WR – World record; PR – Paralympic record;

Women

Athlete	Events	Heat		Final	
Athlete	Events	Time	Rank	Time	Rank
Claire Cashmore	100 m backstroke S9	1:14.47	5 Q	1:14.46	6
Claire Cashmore	100 m breaststroke SB8	1:25.19	2 Q	1:25.60	Bronze medal
Claire Cashmore	100 m butterfly S9	1:13.45	7 Q	1:13.47	8
Claire Cashmore	200 m individual medley SM9	2:42.11	4 Q	2:42.09	4
Emma Cattle	50 m freestyle S10	32.59	14	did not advance	
Emma Cattle	100 m backstroke S10	1:14.05	3 Q	1:14.68	6
Emma Cattle	200 m individual medley SM10	DQ	–	did not advance	
Jennifer Coughlin	100 m freestyle S13	1:06.18	8 Q	1:06.94	8
Jennifer Coughlin	400 m freestyle S13	4:58.01	7 Q	4:56.85	7
Jennifer Coughlin	100 m backstroke S13	1:14.59	7 Q	1:14.67	6
Jennifer Coughlin	100 m butterfly S13	1:11.94	8 Q	1:12.99	8
Heather Frederiksen	50 m freestyle S8	32.79	6 Q	32.59	7
Heather Frederiksen	100 m freestyle S8	1:09.93	3 Q	1:08.48	Silver medal
Heather Frederiksen	400 m freestyle S8	4:58.11	2 Q	4:54.49	Silver medal
Heather Frederiksen	100 m backstroke S8	1:17.62 WR	1 Q	1:16.74 WR	Gold medal
Heather Frederiksen	200 m individual medley SM8	2:53.95	4 Q	2:53.15	Bronze medal
Kate Grey	100 m breaststroke SB9	1:25.83	2 Q	1:26.35	5
Kate Grey	200 m individual medley SM9	2:48.15	11	did not advance	
Rhiannon Henry	50 m freestyle S13	N/A		28.59	7
Rhiannon Henry	100 m freestyle S13	1:03.02	7 Q	1:01.79	7
Rhiannon Henry	400 m freestyle S13	4:53.98	6 Q	4:41.50	5
Rhiannon Henry	100 m butterfly S13	1:10.39	7 Q	1:07.51	5
Charlotte Henshaw	100 m breaststroke SB6	1:45.91	3 Q	1:45.28	4
Elizabeth Johnson	50 m freestyle S6	39.71	8 Q	39.40	8
Elizabeth Johnson	50 m butterfly S6	45.94	12	did not advance	
Elizabeth Johnson	100 m breaststroke SB6	1:42.84	1 Q	1:41.87	Gold medal
Natalie Jones	50 m freestyle S6	38.13	3 Q	37.21	Bronze medal
Natalie Jones	100 m freestyle S6	1:23.43	5 Q	1:21.53	5
Natalie Jones	50 m butterfly S6	44.69	11	did not advance	
Natalie Jones	200 m individual medley SM6	3:21.34	4 Q	3:15.20	Bronze medal
Rachael Latham	100 m backstroke S8	1:22.71	4 Q	1:22.38	5
Rachael Latham	100 m butterfly S8	1:17.72	7 Q	1:18.61	7
Rachael Latham	200 m individual medley SM8	3:08.25	13	did not advance	
Nyree Lewis	400 m freestyle S6	6:13.85	5 Q	6:10.82	6
Nyree Lewis	100 m backstroke S6	1:30.34 PR	1 Q	1:29.35	Silver medal
Nyree Lewis	100 m breaststroke SB5	2:00.45	6 Q	1:56.19	4
Nyree Lewis	200 m individual medley SM6	3:26.94	6 Q	3:23.93	6
Mhairi Love	100 m freestyle S6	1:29.76	9	did not advance	
Mhairi Love	400 m freestyle S6	6:20.31	7 Q	6:15.31	7
Stephanie Millward	50 m freestyle S9	30.69	5 Q	30.45	=6
Stephanie Millward	100 m freestyle S9	1:05.05	3 Q	1:04.52	5
Stephanie Millward	100 m backstroke S9	1:12.34	2 Q	1:14.13	4
Stephanie Millward	100 m butterfly S9	1:15.62	13	did not advance	
Eleanor Simmonds	50 m freestyle S6	38.39	5 Q	37.77	5
Eleanor Simmonds	100 m freestyle S6	1:21.86	2 Q	1:18.75	Gold medal
Eleanor Simmonds	400 m freestyle S6	5:56.24	1 Q	5:41.34 WR	Gold medal
Eleanor Simmonds	50 m butterfly S6	43.69	6 Q	43.14	8
Eleanor Simmonds	200 m individual medley SM6	3:19.91	3 Q	3:18.41	5
Elizabeth Simpkin	100 m backstroke S9	1:15.65	6 Q	1:14.38	5
Elizabeth Simpkin	100 m butterfly S9	1:13.20	5 Q	1:12.19	6
Lauren Steadman	50 m freestyle S9	31.19	9	did not advance	
Lauren Steadman	100 m freestyle S9	1:08.46	15	did not advance	
Lauren Steadman	400 m freestyle S9	5:10.10	12	did not advance	
Louise Watkin	50 m freestyle S9	30.06	4 Q	29.80	Bronze medal
Louise Watkin	100 m freestyle S9	1:04.91	2 Q	1:03.85	Silver medal
Louise Watkin	400 m freestyle S9	4:54.46	3 Q	4:47.14	5
Louise Watkin	100 m breaststroke SB9	1:27.79	7 Q	1:26.10	Bronze medal
Louise Watkin	200 m individual medley SM9	2:42.08	3 Q	2:40.31	Bronze medal
Danielle Watts	50 m freestyle S3	1:28.74 PR (S1)	13	did not advance	
Danielle Watts	50 m backstroke S2	1:27.50 PR (S1)	6 Q	1:27.28	7
Fran Williamson	50 m freestyle S3	1:05.39	3 Q	1:04.22	Bronze medal
Fran Williamson	50 m backstroke S3	1:06.75	2 Q	1:06.07	Silver medal

Legend: Q – Qualifiers for the next round as decided on a time only basis. Ranks shown are overall rank against competitors in all heats; DQ – Disqualified; WR – World record; PR – Paralympic record;

== Table tennis ==
Eleven table tennis players were selected for the GB Paralympic squad. Included in the squad was 50-year-old Dzaier Neil who had previously taken part in the 1984 Los Angeles Games before taking a ten-year break from the sport. In the individual events only Neil Robertson progressed as far as the round of 16 whilst the four teams entered won a total of just two matches between them. The squad therefore failed to win any of the four medals that were targeted by UK Sport.

Men

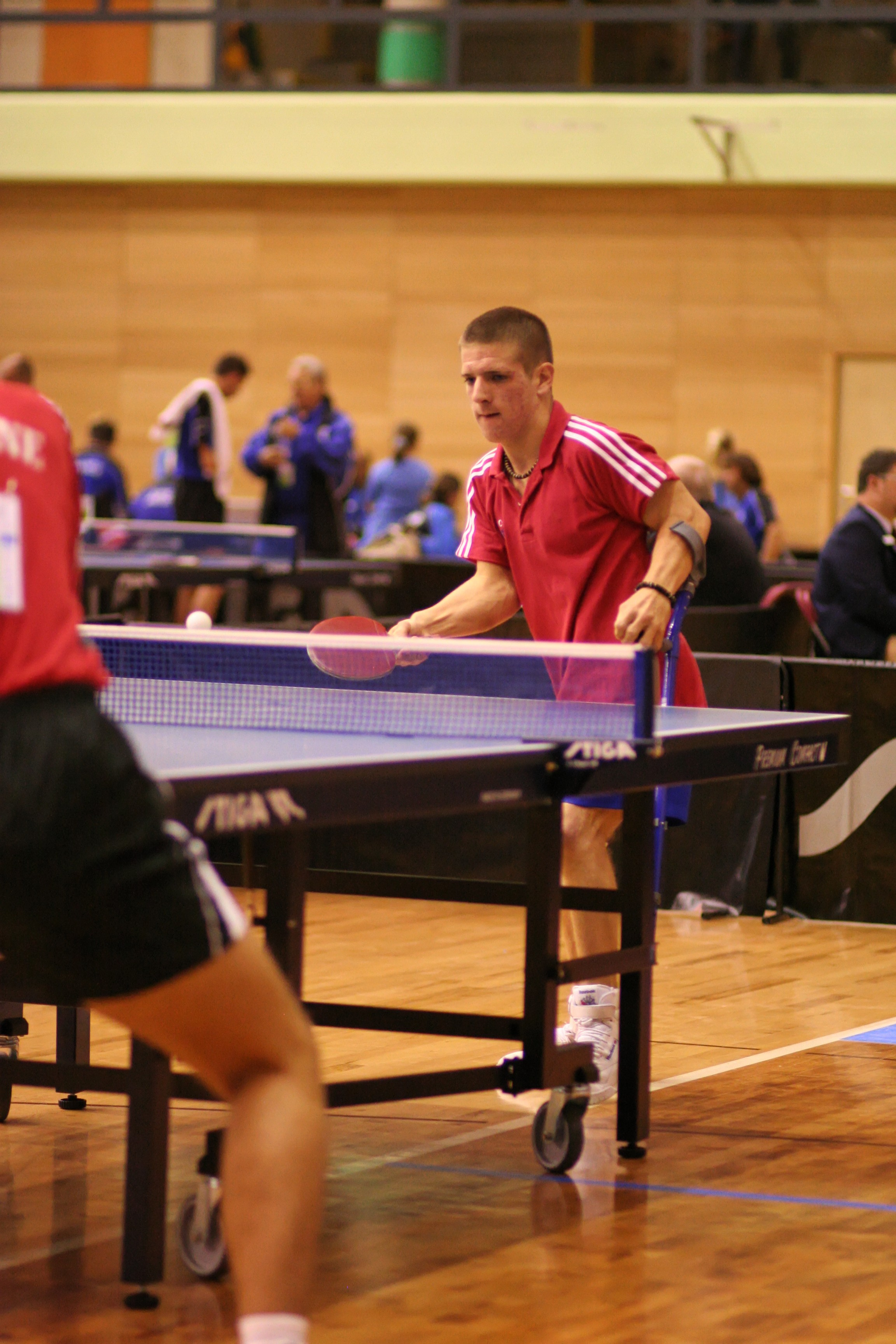
David Wetherill competed in the men's C6 event

Athlete	Event	Group matches		Round of 16	Quarterfinals	Semi-finals	Final Bronze final	
Athlete	Event	Opposition Result	Rank	Opposition Result	Opposition Result	Opposition Result	Opposition Result	Rank
Will Bayley	Singles C7	Wollmert (GER); L 0–3 Shur (ISR); W 3–1; Popov (UKR); L 2–3	3	N/A		did not advance		
Arnie Chan	Singles C3	Piñas (ESP); L 2–3 Kylevik (SWE); L 0–3	3	did not advance				
Paul Karabardak	Singles C7	Morales (ESP); L 3–2 Ye (CHN); L 0–3; Lambert (CZE); W 3–1	3	N/A		did not advance		
James Rawson	Singles C3	Unger (AUT); L 0–3 Silva (BRA); W 3–1	3	did not advance				
Scott Robertson	Singles C4/5	Scott (USA); W 3–0 Kobar (GER); L 0–3	2	did not advance				
Neil Robinson	Singles C3	Abuajela (LBA); W WO Guilhem (FRA); W 3–1	1	Silva (BRA); L 0–3	did not advance			
David Wetherill	Singles C6	Schmidt (GER); W 3–1 Kowalski (POL); L 2–3; Michell (BRA); W 3–0	1	N/A		did not advance		
Arnie Chan; James Rawson; Neil Robinson	Team C3	N/A			Libya (LBA); W 3–0	France (FRA); L 0–3	China (CHN); L 1–3	4
Will Bayley; Paul Karabardak; David Wetherill	Team C6-8	N/A		China (CHN); L 0–3	did not advance			

Women

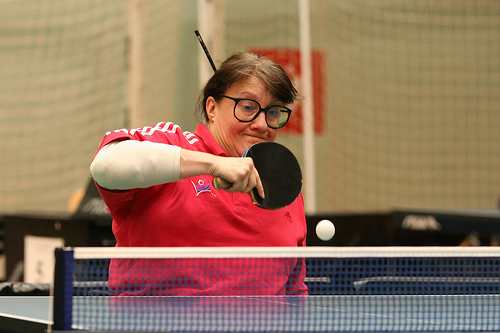
Cathy Mitton competed in the women's C1–2 event

Athlete	Event	Group matches		Round of 16	Quarterfinals	Semi-finals	Final Bronze final	
Athlete	Event	Opposition Result	Rank	Opposition Result	Opposition Result	Opposition Result	Opposition Result	Rank
Sue Gilroy	Singles C4	Matic (SLO); W 3–1 Zhou (CHN); L 1–3; Almeida (RSA); W 3–0	2	N/A		did not advance		
Cathy Mitton	Singles C1/2	Sireua-Gossiaux (FRA); W 3–1 Lui (CHN); L 1–3	2	N/A		did not advance		
Dzaier Neil	Singles C1/2	Podda (ITA); L 2–3 Clot (FRA); L 0–3	3	N/A		did not advance		
Claire Robertson	Singles C4	Zorzetto (ITA); L 1–3 Moon (KOR); L 0–3; Obiora (NGR); L 1–3	4	N/A		did not advance		
Cathy Mitton; Dzaier Neil	Team C1-3	N/A			Iran (IRI); W 3–2	Italy (ITA); L 0–3	France (FRA); L 0–3	4
Sue Gilroy; Claire Robertson	Team C4/5	N/A		Serbia (SRB); L 0–3	did not advance			

== Wheelchair tennis ==
Team Paralympic GB had competitors in four of the six wheelchair tennis disciplines; men's, women's and mixed quads singles and mixed quad doubles. Peter Norfolk, nicknamed the 'Quadfather', won gold in the mixed quad singles, successfully defending the title he had won in Athens.

Athlete	Event	Round of 64	Round of 32	Round of 16	Quarterfinals	Semi-finals	Finals	
Athlete	Event	Opposition Result	Opposition Result	Opposition Result	Opposition Result	Opposition Result	Opposition Result	Rank
Jamie Burdekin	Mixed quad singles	N/A		Weinberg (ISR); L 2–6 4–6	did not advance			
Alex Jewitt	Men's singles	Kunieda (JPN); L 0–6 1–6	did not advance					
Peter Norfolk	Mixed quad singles	N/A		de Beer (NED); W 6–1 6–1	Kimura (JPN); W 6–0 6–1	Taylor (USA); W 6–0 6–3	Andersson (SWE); W 6–2 6–2	Gold medal
David Phillipson	Men's singles	Mathieu (CAN); W 6–3 6–1	Legner (AUT); L 0–6 0–6	did not advance				
Gordon Reid	Men's singles	Ammerlaan (NED); L 3–6 0–6	did not advance					
Lucy Shuker	Women's singles	N/A	Domori (JPN); W 6–1 6–3	Gravellier (FRA); L 6–2 1–6 4–6	did not advance			
Kevin Simpson	Men's singles	Gatelli (ITA); L 1–6 7–6(4) 4–6	did not advance					
Jordanne Whiley	Women's singles	N/A	Racineux (FRA); L 4–6 4–6	did not advance				
Alex Jewitt; Kevin Simpson	Men's doubles	N/A	Gatelli, Mazzei (ITA); L 4–6 4–6	did not advance				
Peter Norfolk; Jamie Burdekin	Mixed quad doubles	N/A			lost 22–1	Kramer, Weinberg (ISR); L 4–6 4–6	van Erp, Timmermans (NED); W 6(4)–7 7–5 6–1	Bronze medal
Lucy Shuker; Jordanne Whiley	Women's doubles	N/A		Bye	Arnoult, Verfuerth (USA); L 7–5 5–7 2–6	did not advance		
David Phillipson; Gordon Reid	Men's doubles	N/A	Felix, Gergely (SVK); L 2–6 2–6	did not advance				

== Media coverage ==
As with the 2008 Summer Olympics, the BBC aired coverage of the Games in the UK. The Games were broadcast in high-definition for the first time. BBC Red Button and bbc.co.uk showed live coverage throughout the Games, with a nightly highlights programme on BBC Two (simulcast on BBC HD), anchored by Clare Balding and Steve Cram. Live coverage was also shown on BBC One, BBC Two, and BBC HD on Saturdays and Sundays. Both the opening and closing ceremonies were broadcast live. Radio coverage was provided by BBC Radio 5 Live.

== See also ==
- Great Britain at the Paralympics
- Great Britain at the 2008 Summer Olympics
