= Swimming at the 2008 Summer Paralympics – Men's 100 metre freestyle S7 =

Men's 100m Freestyle S7 at the XIII Paralympic Games
- Venue: Beijing National Aquatics Center
- Dates: 8 September
- Competitors: 13 from 9 nations
- Winning time: 1:00.35

Medalists
| 1st place, gold medalist(s) | | David Roberts | Great Britain |
| 2nd place, silver medalist(s) | | Lantz Lamback | United States |
| 3rd place, bronze medalist(s) | | Matt Walker | Great Britain |

The men's 100m freestyle S7 event at the 2008 Summer Paralympics took place at the Beijing National Aquatics Center on 8 September. There were two heats; the swimmers with the eight fastest times advanced to the final.

== Results ==
=== Heats ===
Competed from 09:27.

==== Heat 1 ====
| Rank | Name | Nationality | Time | Notes |
|---|---|---|---|---|
| 1 | Lantz Lamback | United States | 1:03.70 | Q |
| 2 | Jon Fox | Great Britain | 1:08.16 | Q |
| 3 | Iurii Andriushin | Ukraine | 1:08.52 | Q |
| 4 | Alex Hadley | Australia | 1:08.67 | Q |
| 5 | Janos Becsey | Hungary | 1:09.78 | Q |
| 6 | Dejan Fabcic | Slovenia | 1:11.85 | |

==== Heat 2 ====
| Rank | Name | Nationality | Time | Notes |
|---|---|---|---|---|
| 1 | David Roberts | Great Britain | 1:00.82 | Q |
| 2 | Matt Walker | Great Britain | 1:05.49 | Q |
| 3 | Tian Rong | China | 1:07.61 | Q |
| 4 | Nikolaos Tsotras | Greece | 1:10.07 | |
| 5 | Pei Mang | China | 1:11.01 | |
| 6 | Jay Dohnt | Australia | 1:11.33 | |
| 7 | Jumpei Kimura | Japan | 1:13.34 | |

=== Final ===
Competed at 18:10.

| Rank | Name | Nationality | Time | Notes |
|---|---|---|---|---|
| 1st place, gold medalist(s) | David Roberts | Great Britain | 1:00.35 | PR |
| 2nd place, silver medalist(s) | Lantz Lamback | United States | 1:02.40 | |
| 3rd place, bronze medalist(s) | Matt Walker | Great Britain | 1:04.17 | |
| 4 | Tian Rong | China | 1:07.63 | |
| 5 | Jon Fox | Great Britain | 1:07.82 | |
| 6 | Alex Hadley | Australia | 1:07.90 | |
| 7 | Iurii Andriushin | Ukraine | 1:08.79 | |
| 8 | Janos Becsey | Hungary | 1:09.20 | |

Q = qualified for final. PR = Paralympic Record.
