= Swimming at the 2008 Summer Paralympics – Men's 400 metre freestyle S6 =

Men's 400m Freestyle S6 at the XIII Paralympic Games
- Venue: Beijing National Aquatics Center
- Dates: 14 September
- Competitors: 11 from 9 nations
- Winning time: 4:48.31

Medalists
1st place, gold medalist(s)		Anders Olsson	Sweden
2nd place, silver medalist(s)		Darragh McDonald	Ireland
3rd place, bronze medalist(s)		Matthew Whorwood	Great Britain

The men's 400m freestyle S6 event at the 2008 Summer Paralympics took place at the Beijing National Aquatics Center on 14 September. There were two heats; the swimmers with the eight fastest times advanced to the final.

== Results ==
=== Heats ===
Competed from 09:34.

==== Heat 1 ====
Rank	Name	Nationality	Time	Notes
1	Darragh McDonald	Ireland	5:13.68	Q
2	Matthew Whorwood	Great Britain	5:20.03	Q
3	Tang Yuan	China	5:28.26	Q
4	Stian Helgeland	Norway	5:32.26	Q
5	Johnny Cummings	Ireland	5:50.54	

==== Heat 2 ====
Rank	Name	Nationality	Time	Notes
1	Anders Olsson	Sweden	5:00.41	Q, PR
2	Adriano Lima	Brazil	5:27.10	Q
3	Swen Michaelis	Germany	5:27.35	Q
4	Kyosuke Oyama	Japan	5:38.86	Q
5	Jorgen Tadvin	Norway	6:03.36	
6	Igor Plotnikov	Russia	6:24.21	

=== Final ===
Competed at 18:07.

Rank	Name	Nationality	Time	Notes
1st place, gold medalist(s)	Anders Olsson	Sweden	4:48.31	WR
2nd place, silver medalist(s)	Darragh McDonald	Ireland	5:09.75	
3rd place, bronze medalist(s)	Matthew Whorwood	Great Britain	5:20.45	
4	Adriano Lima	Brazil	5:22.90	
5	Swen Michaelis	Germany	5:26.17	
6	Tang Yuan	China	5:27.16	
7	Kyosuke Oyama	Japan	5:28.38	
8	Stian Helgeland	Norway	5:32.24	

Q = qualified for final. WR = World Record. PR = Paralympic Record.
