= Swimming at the 2008 Summer Paralympics – Men's 100 metre breaststroke SB6 =

Men's 100m Breaststroke SB6 at the XIII Paralympic Games
- Venue: Beijing National Aquatics Center
- Dates: 12 September
- Competitors: 10 from 6 nations
- Winning time: 1:27.22

Medalists
1st place, gold medalist(s)		Alexey Fomenkov	Russia
2nd place, silver medalist(s)		Gareth Duke	Great Britain
3rd place, bronze medalist(s)		Matthew Whorwood	Great Britain

The men's 100m breaststroke SB6 event at the 2008 Summer Paralympics took place at the Beijing National Aquatics Center on 12 September. There were two heats; the swimmers with the eight fastest times advanced to the final.

== Results ==
=== Heats ===
Competed from 10:34.

==== Heat 1 ====
Rank	Name	Nationality	Time	Notes
1	Alexey Fomenkov	Russia	1:34.32	Q
2	Dejan Fabcic	Slovenia	1:35.73	Q
3	Danielson Santos	Brazil	1:36.05	Q
4	Kirill Sokolov	Russia	1:36.45	Q
5	Jose Gonzales-Mugaburu	Peru	1:46.67	

==== Heat 2 ====
Rank	Name	Nationality	Time	Notes
1	Matt Whorwood	Great Britain	1:30.52	Q
2	Gareth Duke	Great Britain	1:31.54	Q
3	Jumpei Kimura	Japan	1:34.62	Q
4	Artem Zakharov	Russia	1:40.61	Q
5	Gledson Soares	Brazil	1:41.27	

=== Final ===
Competed at 19:10.

Rank	Name	Nationality	Time	Notes
1st place, gold medalist(s)	Alexey Fomenkov	Russia	1:27.22	PR
2nd place, silver medalist(s)	Gareth Duke	Great Britain	1:28.20	
3rd place, bronze medalist(s)	Matthew Whorwood	Great Britain	1:29.96	
4	Kirill Sokolov	Russia	1:33.77	
5	Jumpei Kimura	Japan	1:35.88	
6	Dejan Fabcic	Slovenia	1:36.21	
7	Danielson Santos	Brazil	1:36.51	
8	Artem Zakharov	Russia	1:39.61	

Q = qualified for final. PR = Paralympic Record.
