= Swimming at the 2008 Summer Paralympics – Men's 400 metre freestyle S7 =

Men's 400m Freestyle S7 at the XIII Paralympic Games
- Venue: Beijing National Aquatics Center
- Dates: 11 September
- Competitors: 10 from 6 nations
- Winning time: 4:52.35

Medalists
1st place, gold medalist(s)		David Roberts	Great Britain
2nd place, silver medalist(s)		Lantz Lamback	United States
3rd place, bronze medalist(s)		Jay Dohnt	Australia

The men's 400m freestyle S7 event at the 2008 Summer Paralympics took place at the Beijing National Aquatics Center on 11 September. There were two heats; the swimmers with the eight fastest times advanced to the final.

== Results ==
=== Heats ===
Competed from 09:00.

==== Heat 1 ====
Rank	Name	Nationality	Time	Notes
1	Andrew Lindsay	Great Britain	5:06.31	Q
2	Jay Dohnt	Australia	5:06.65	Q
3	Tian Rong	China	5:15.99	Q
4	Jon Fox	Great Britain	5:31.78	
5	Thomas Grimm	Germany	5:37.00	

==== Heat 2 ====
Rank	Name	Nationality	Time	Notes
1	David Roberts	Great Britain	5:04.31	Q
2	Lantz Lamback	United States	5:05.65	Q
3	Alex Dionne	United States	5:14.97	Q
4	Alex Hadley	Australia	5:18.23	Q
5	Jumpei Kimura	Japan	5:29.67	Q

=== Final ===
Competed at 17:00.

Rank	Name	Nationality	Time	Notes
1st place, gold medalist(s)	David Roberts	Great Britain	4:52.35	WR
2nd place, silver medalist(s)	Lantz Lamback	United States	4:56.46	
3rd place, bronze medalist(s)	Jay Dohnt	Australia	4:59.47	
4	Alex Dionne	United States	5:02.62	
5	Andrew Lindsay	Great Britain	5:02.74	
6	Tian Rong	China	5:10.39	
7	Alex Hadley	Australia	5:20.79	
8	Jumpei Kimura	Japan	5:28.10	

Q = qualified for final. WR = World Record.
