= Swimming at the 2008 Summer Paralympics – Men's 50 metre freestyle S7 =

Men's 50m Freestyle S7 at the XIII Paralympic Games
- Venue: Beijing National Aquatics Center
- Dates: 14 September
- Competitors: 9 from 7 nations
- Winning time: 27.95

Medalists
1st place, gold medalist(s)		David Roberts	Great Britain
2nd place, silver medalist(s)		Matt Walker	Great Britain
3rd place, bronze medalist(s)		Lantz Lamback	United States

The men's 50m freestyle S7 event at the 2008 Summer Paralympics took place at the Beijing National Aquatics Center on 14 September. There were two heats; the swimmers with the eight fastest times advanced to the final.

== Results ==
=== Heats ===
Competed from 10:18.

==== Heat 1 ====
Rank	Name	Nationality	Time	Notes
1	Matt Walker	Great Britain	28.75	Q
2	Alex Hadley	Australia	30.76	Q
3	Yuriy Andryushin	Ukraine	31.17	Q
4	Nikolaos Tsotras	Greece	31.41	Q

==== Heat 2 ====
Rank	Name	Nationality	Time	Notes
1	David Roberts	Great Britain	28.33	Q, PR
2	Lantz Lamback	United States	29.95	Q
3	Jon Fox	Great Britain	31.17	Q
4	Janos Becsey	Hungary	31.99	Q
5	Dejan Fabcic	Slovenia	33.80	

=== Final ===
Competed at 19:07.

Rank	Name	Nationality	Time	Notes
1st place, gold medalist(s)	David Roberts	Great Britain	27.95	PR
2nd place, silver medalist(s)	Matt Walker	Great Britain	28.60	
3rd place, bronze medalist(s)	Lantz Lamback	United States	28.81	
4	Alex Hadley	Australia	30.75	
5	Nikolaos Tsotras	Greece	31.01	
6	Yuriy Andryushin	Ukraine	31.12	
7	Janos Becsey	Hungary	31.46	
8	Jon Fox	Great Britain	31.53	

Q = qualified for final. PR = Paralympic Record.
