= Equestrian at the 2008 Summer Paralympics – Individual freestyle test grade III =

Individual Freestyle Test Grade III at the XIII Paralympic Games
- Paralympic Equestrian
- Venue: Hong Kong Olympic Equestrian Centre
- Dates: 11 September 2008
- Competitors: 12 from 10 nations

Medalists
1st place, gold medalist(s)		Hannelore Brenner	Germany
2nd place, silver medalist(s)		Simon Laurens	Great Britain
3rd place, bronze medalist(s)		Annika Lykke Dalskov	Denmark

The Equestrian Individual Freestyle Test Grade III event at the 2008 Summer Paralympics was held in the Hong Kong Olympic Equestrian Centre on 11 September.

The competition was assessed by a ground jury composed of five judges placed at locations designated E, H, C, M, and B. Each judge rated the competitors' performances with scores out of 10 for technical difficulty and artistic merit. The ten scores from the jury were then summed to determine a rider's total percentage score.

The event was won by Hannelore Brenner, representing Germany.

== Ground jury ==
Judge at E	Anne Prain ( France)
Judge at H	Kjell Myhre ( Norway)
Judge at C	Alison Mastin ( Ireland), jury president
Judge at M	Liliana Iannone ( Argentina)
Judge at B	Janet Geary ( Australia)

== Results ==
Rank	Rider	Horse		Score (and rank)					Tech/Art Score (Rk)	Total % score
Rank	Rider	Horse		E	H	C	M	B	Tech/Art Score (Rk)	Total % score
1st place, gold medalist(s)	Hannelore Brenner (GER)	Women Of The World	Tech:	6.778 (5)	7.000 (3)	7.222 (4)	7.222 (1)	7.000 (2)	35.222 (4)	74.223
1st place, gold medalist(s)	Hannelore Brenner (GER)	Women Of The World	Art:	7.556 (2)	8.056 (1)	7.833 (1)	7.778 (1)	7.778 (1)	39.001 (1)	74.223
2nd place, silver medalist(s)	Simon Laurens (GBR)	Ocean Diamond	Tech:	7.333 (1)	7.333 (1)	7.444 (1)	7.111 (2)	6.889 (5)	36.110 (1)	73.499
2nd place, silver medalist(s)	Simon Laurens (GBR)	Ocean Diamond	Art:	7.667 (1)	7.722 (3)	7.611 (2)	7.167 (4)	7.222 (5)	37.389 (3)	73.499
3rd place, bronze medalist(s)	Annika Lykke Dalskov (DEN)	Alfarvad April Z	Tech:	7.111 (2)	7.111 (2)	7.333 (2)	7.000 (4)	6.778 (6)	35.333 (3)	73.222
3rd place, bronze medalist(s)	Annika Lykke Dalskov (DEN)	Alfarvad April Z	Art:	7.500 (3)	7.944 (2)	7.556 (3)	7.333 (2)	7.556 (3)	37.889 (2)	73.222
4	Deborah Criddle (GBR)	Pavaroti	Tech:	7.111 (2)	7.000 (3)	7.333 (2)	7.111 (2)	7.444 (1)	35.999 (2)	73.110
4	Deborah Criddle (GBR)	Pavaroti	Art:	7.333 (5)	7.667 (4)	7.222 (5)	7.222 (3)	7.667 (2)	37.111 (4)	73.110
5	Silvia Veratti (ITA)	Balla Coi Lupi	Tech:	6.667 (6)	6.556 (6)	7.000 (5)	6.667 (7)	6.778 (6)	33.668 (7)	69.834
5	Silvia Veratti (ITA)	Balla Coi Lupi	Art:	7.389 (4)	7.222 (5)	7.333 (4)	7.000 (5)	7.222 (5)	36.166 (5)	69.834
6	Bettina Eistel (GER)	Fabuleux 5	Tech:	6.889 (4)	6.556 (6)	6.667 (7)	7.000 (4)	7.000 (2)	34.112 (5)	69.612
6	Bettina Eistel (GER)	Fabuleux 5	Art:	6.889 (7)	7.222 (5)	6.889 (7)	7.000 (5)	7.500 (4)	35.500 (7)	69.612
7	Sharon Jarvis (AUS)	Odorado	Tech:	6.667 (6)	6.556 (6)	6.778 (6)	6.778 (6)	7.000 (2)	33.779 (6)	69.446
7	Sharon Jarvis (AUS)	Odorado	Art:	7.222 (6)	7.167 (7)	7.167 (6)	7.000 (5)	7.111 (7)	35.667 (6)	69.446
8	Bert Vermeir (BEL)	Tiramisu	Tech:	6.333 (8)	6.778 (5)	6.444 (8)	6.667 (7)	6.556 (9)	32.778 (8)	67.389
8	Bert Vermeir (BEL)	Tiramisu	Art:	6.833 (8)	7.167 (7)	6.722 (8)	7.000 (5)	6.889 (8)	34.611 (8)	67.389
9	Gabriella Of (SWE)	Oleander	Tech:	6.111 (9)	6.444 (9)	6.222 (10)	6.222 (9)	6.667 (8)	31.666 (9)	65.055
9	Gabriella Of (SWE)	Oleander	Art:	6.667 (9)	7.056 (9)	6.722 (8)	6.444 (10)	6.500 (9)	33.389 (9)	65.055
10	Barbara Grassmyer (USA)	Mibis	Tech:	5.889 (10)	6.222 (10)	6.000 (11)	6.222 (9)	6.000 (11)	30.333 (10)	63.389
10	Barbara Grassmyer (USA)	Mibis	Art:	6.556 (10)	6.667 (10)	6.722 (8)	6.778 (9)	6.333 (10)	33.056 (10)	63.389
11	Silje Gillund (NOR)	Dundee Klint	Tech:	5.889 (10)	6.000 (11)	6.333 (9)	5.556 (11)	6.222 (10)	30.000 (11)	61.056
11	Silje Gillund (NOR)	Dundee Klint	Art:	6.167 (11)	6.278 (11)	6.611 (11)	5.778 (11)	6.222 (11)	31.056 (11)	61.056
12	Yutaka Shibuya (JPN)	Elegance	Tech:	4.556 (12)	4.333 (12)	4.333 (12)	4.889 (12)	4.778 (12)	22.889 (12)	48.278
12	Yutaka Shibuya (JPN)	Elegance	Art:	5.000 (12)	4.889 (12)	5.611 (12)	4.889 (12)	5.000 (12)	25.389 (12)	48.278
