= Alexey Fomenkov =

Russian Paralympic swimmer

Medal record

Swimming

Representing Russia

Paralympic Games
Gold medal – first place	2008 Beijing	100 metre breaststroke - SB6

Alexey Fomenkov (Russian: Алексей Алексеевич Фоменков) is a paralympic swimmer from Russia competing mainly in category SB6 events.

Fomenkov competed at the 2008 Summer Paralympics in Beijing. He set a games record in winning the 100m breaststroke, finished fourth in the 100m backstroke and was part of the Russian 4x50m breaststroke team that was disqualified in the heats.
