= Rik Waddon =

British racing cyclist and Paralympian

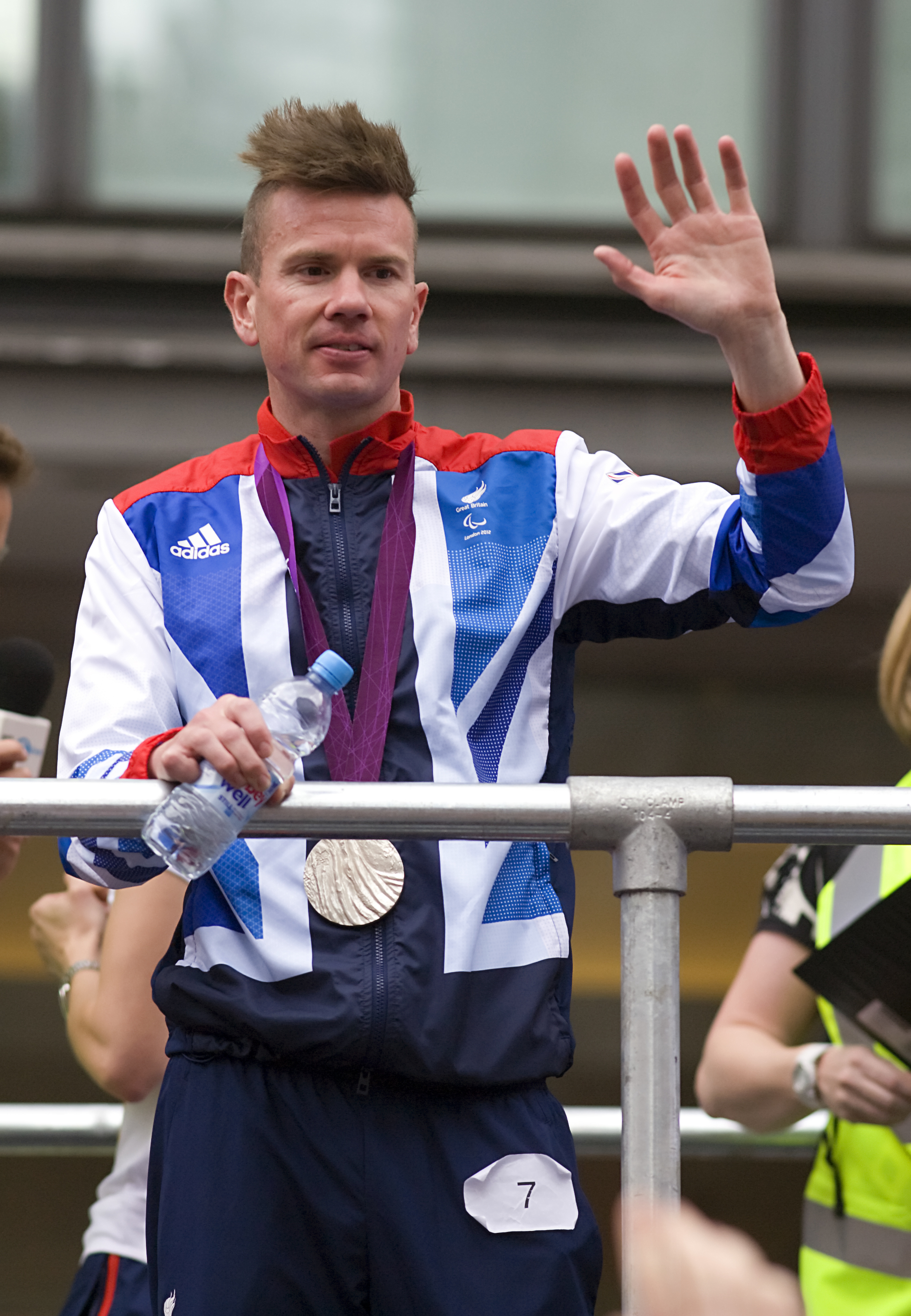

Personal information
- Full name: Rik Waddon
- Born: 27 February 1977 (age 49) Chester, England, United Kingdom
- Height: 172 cm (5 ft 8 in)
- Weight: 58 kg (128 lb)

Cycling career
- Sport: Cycling
- Current team: paraT Paracycling Team
- Disciplines: Track & Road
- Role: Rider
- Rider type: Road
Medal record
Representing Great Britain
Men's cycling
Paralympic Games
Silver medal – second place	2008 Beijing	1km Time Trial (CP 3)
Gold medal – first place	2012 London	Mixed Team Sprint (C1-5)

Rik Waddon (born 27 February 1977) is a Professional Paralympic British road and track racing cyclist and Paralympian.

Waddon is a brain injury survivor, after being involved in a bicycle accident at the age of five. This resulted in physical disabilities, memory loss and recurring fatigue.

He won silver medals in the Beijing 2008 and London 2012 Paralympics.

Waddon married the Paralympic swimmer Natalie Jones in 2010. They are each the subject of a Lego minifigure.

His autobiography, A Saving Grace was published in January 2021.

== Bibliography ==
- A Saving Grace. Austin Macauley Publishers. 2021. ISBN 978-1528989428.
