= Peter Finbow =

British wheelchair basketball player

Personal information
- Full name: Peter Finbow
- Born: Peter Finbow; 17 May 1975 (age 51) Bradford, Yorkshire

Sport
- Country: Great Britain
- Sport: Wheelchair basketball

Peter Finbow (born 17 May 1975) is a British wheelchair basketball player. He was selected to play for Team GB in the 2012 Summer Paralympics in London.

== Personal life ==
Finbow was born on 17 May 1975 in Bradford, Yorkshire, northern England. He had a road accident at the age of sixteen years. He is a Paraplegic, meaning that he has an impairment in motor or sensory function in his lower extremities. In 2010, Finbow admitted in court to a £30,000 benefit fraud, as he had failed to admit his Lottery funding.

== Wheelchair basketball ==
Finbow is classed as a 2.0 wheelchair basketball player. He currently trains with the Oldham Owls. He has played wheelchair basketball for more than twenty years, first spending fourteen years with the Tameside Owls. He first represented Great Britain in 2000.

Finbow played his first championship at the European Championships in 2001–02, in Amsterdam, Netherlands. He finished in fourth position. At the 2002 World Wheelchair Basketball Championships in Kitakyushu, Japan, he got a silver medal; finishing in second place. At the 2003 European Championships in Sassari, Italy. Along with his team, he finished in third place, achieving bronze. In 2004, he played for the Great British Paralympic team in the 2004 Summer Paralympic Games held in Athens. He managed to reach third place, along with his team, winning a Paralympic bronze medal. In 2005, he competed in his second European Championship, this time held in Paris, France. He achieved a silver medal. In the 2006 World Championships in Amsterdam, Finbow was out of the medals. He finished in fifth place. 2007 saw a silver medal at the European Championships, held in Wetzlar, Netherlands. Finbow participated in his second Paralympic Games, the 2008 Summer Paralympics, held in Beijing, China. Along with his team, they finished in bronze medal position. Finbow also achieved bronze at the 2009 European Championships, held in Adana, Turkey. In 2011, there was a victory at the 2011 European Championships, held in Nazareth, Israel. He finished, along with his team, in first place.
