= Ann Wild =

British wheelchair basketball player

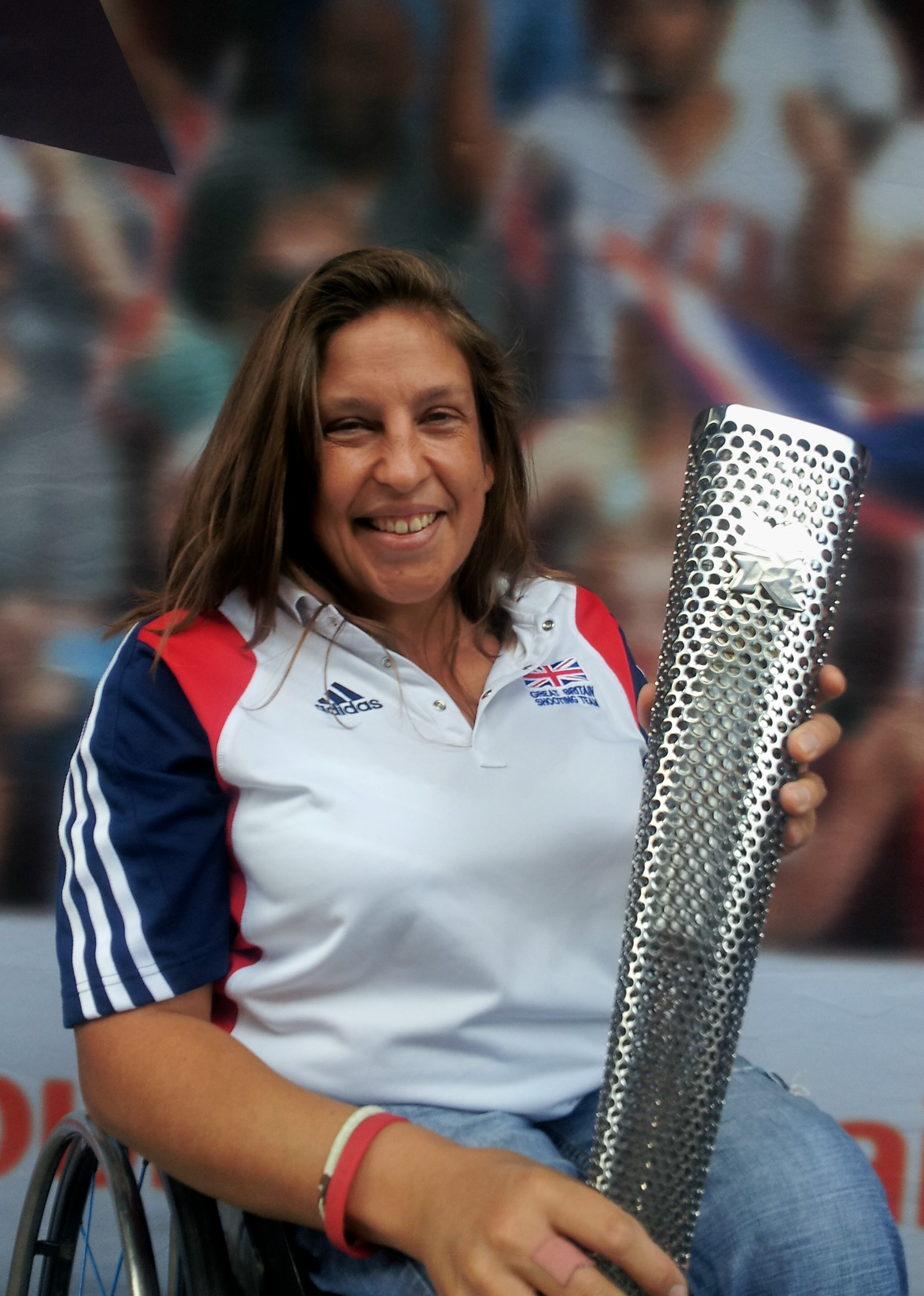
- Ann Wild at The London 2012 Paralympic Games

No. 8 – London Titans
- Position: Point Guard
- League: UK National League

Personal information
- Born: 11 April 1973 (age 53) Ilford, Essex, Great Britain

Career information
- College: Brunel University, University of East London
- Playing career: 1983–present

Career highlights
- All domestic and European honours

Ann Wild OBE (born 11 April 1973) is a retired British wheelchair basketball player.

She was part of Great Britain's women's wheelchair basketball team at the 1988, 1996, 2000, 2004 and 2008 Summer Paralympics.

After retiring from basketball, Wild attempted to qualify for 2012 Summer Paralympics in London in shooting, but narrowly missed out on selection for the team.

In June 2010, Wild was awarded the OBE for services to wheelchair basketball.

Wild appeared in the Paralympic special edition of Channel 4's show Come Dine with Me. She also provided expert analysis for Channel 4's coverage of the women's wheelchair basketball tournament at the 2012 Summer Paralympics in London.

Wild is a professionally qualified Occupational Therapist and has returned to wheelchair basketball as a coach.
