= Jay Dohnt =

Australian Paralympic swimmer

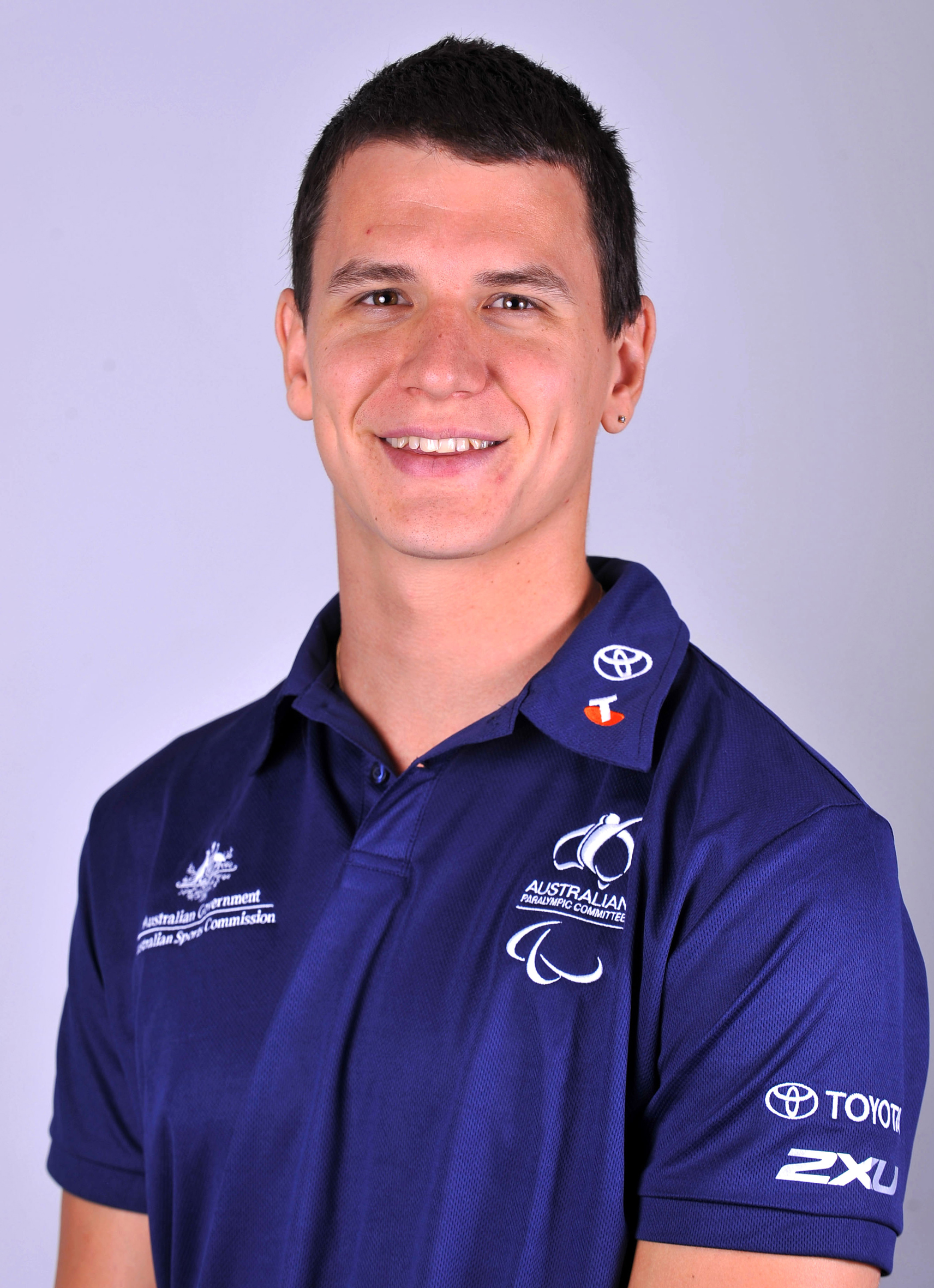
- 2012 Australian Paralympic team portrait of Dohnt

Personal information
- Nationality: Australia
- Born: 20 November 1989 (age 36) Adelaide, South Australia, Australia

Sport
- Sport: Swimming
- Strokes: Freestyle
- Classifications: S7, SB6, SM7
Medal record
Men's paralympic swimming
Representing Australia
Paralympic Games
Bronze medal – third place	2008 Beijing	400 m freestyle S7

Jay Dohnt (born 20 November 1989 in Adelaide, South Australia) is a Paralympic swimming competitor from Australia. He is a bilateral below the knee amputee as a result of meningococcal disease at the age of thirteen. He is also missing four fingers on his right hand. He chose swimming as legs were not required to do it and obtained a scuba diving ticket.

== Career ==
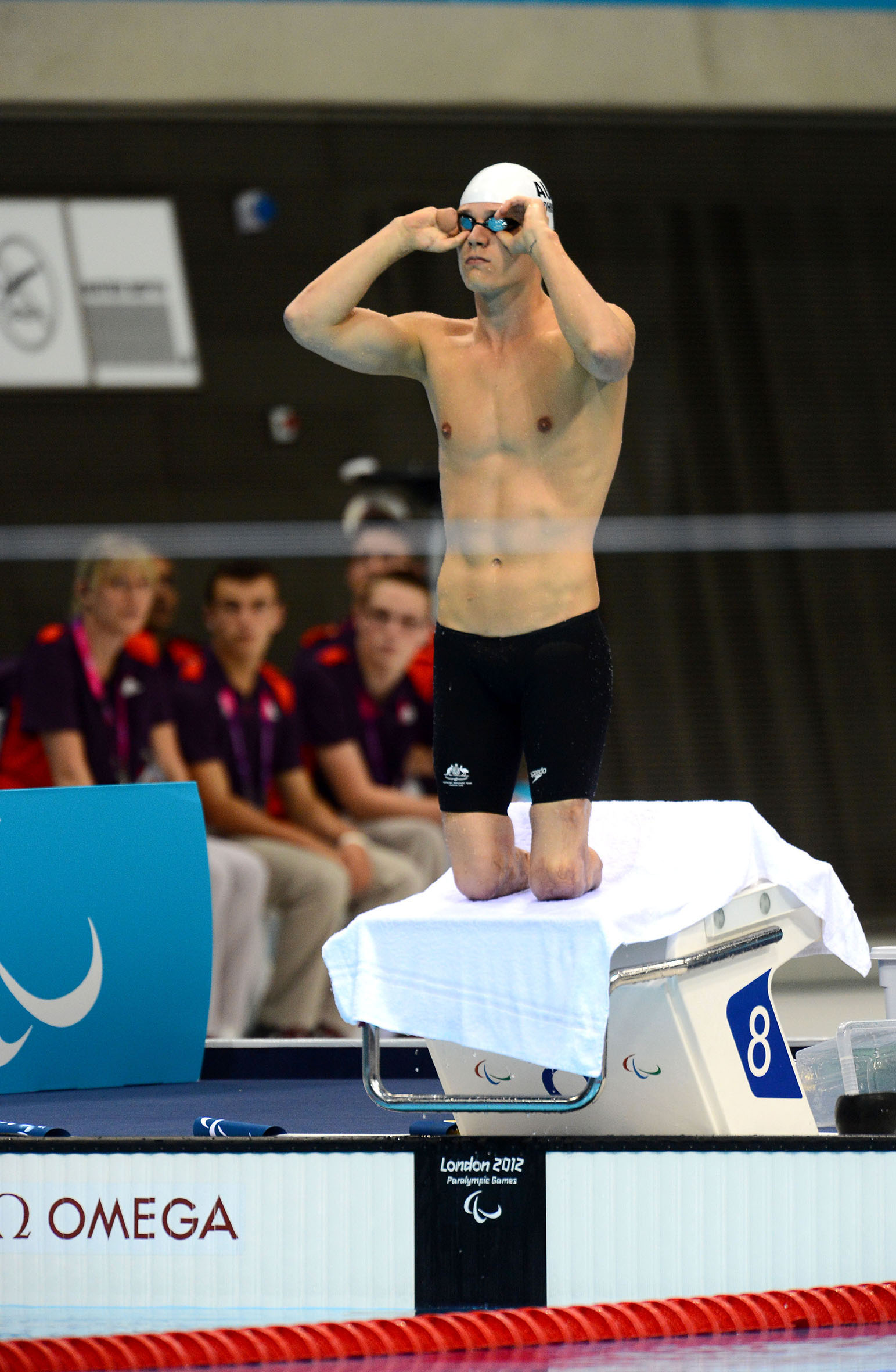
Dohnt at the 2012 London Paralympics

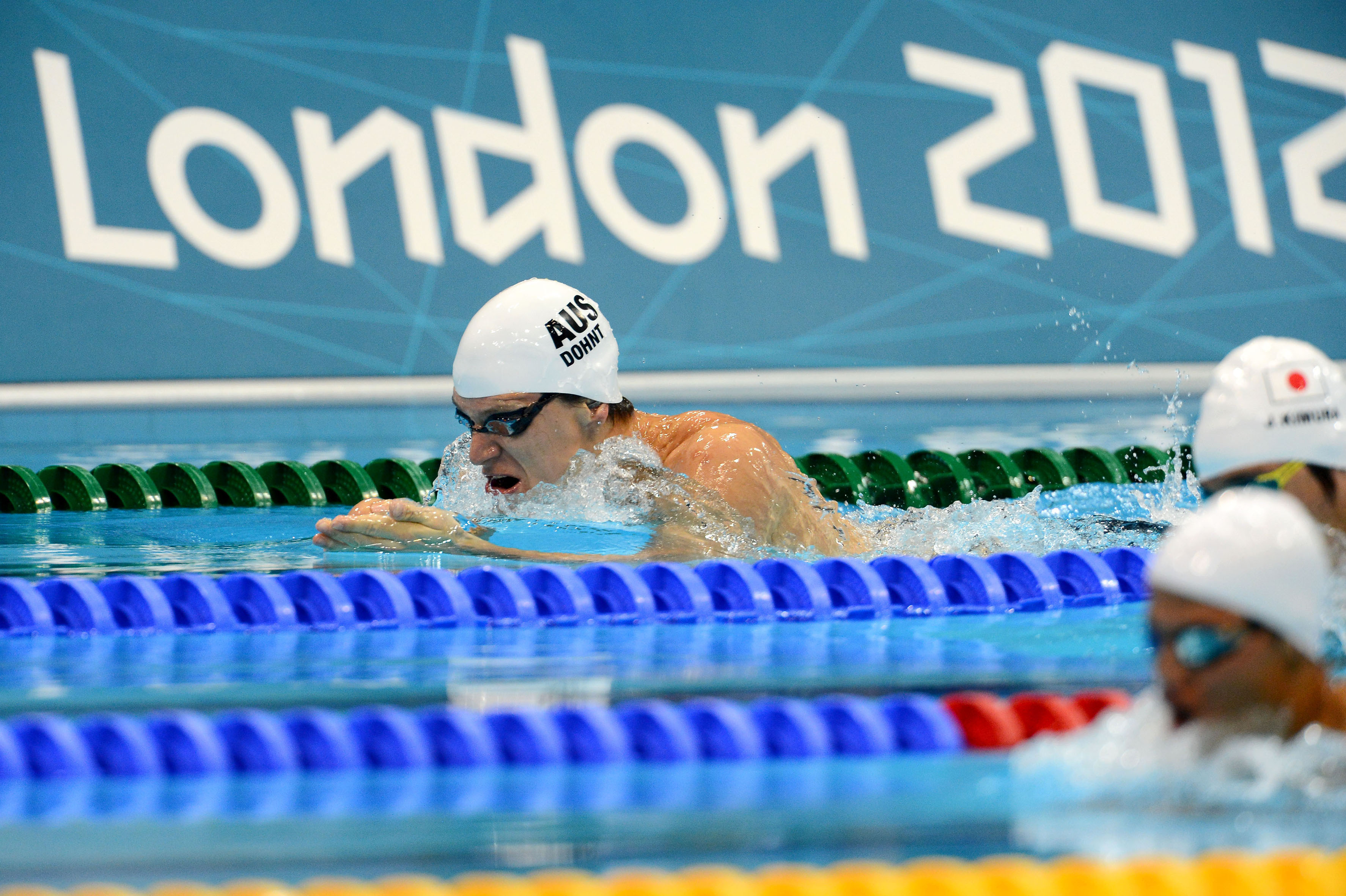
Dohnt at the 2012 London Paralympics

In 2006, he was the only competitor in the men's freestyle multi-disability section of the 2006 Australian Open Water Swimming Titles in Melbourne, Victoria.

He won a bronze medal at the 2008 Beijing Games in the men's 400 m freestyle S7 event. He is an Australian Institute of Sport paralympic swimming and South Australian Sports Institute scholarship holder. He was unable to compete in 2010 due to a serious shoulder injury. In 2011, he won a silver medal in the men's 400m freestyle S7 at the Para Pan Pacific Championships in Edmonton, Canada.

In 2008, he took up golf.

At the 2012 Summer Paralympics he represented Australia in the 100 m breaststroke SB6, 200 m individual medley SM7 and 400 m freestyle S7.

== Recognition ==
- 2005 - Pride of Australia Courage Award.
- 2007- Athlete of the Year award in South Australian Wheelchair Sports.
- 2009 - Swimming SA Hall of Fame inductee.
- 2011 - Tanya Denver Award, given to the Advertiser Channel Seven Sports Star of the Year who displays endeavour and sportsmanship.
