= Jon Hall (basketball) =

British wheelchair basketball player (born 1982)

Jonathan Hall
Personal information
- Full name: Jonathan Hall
- Nickname: Jon Hall
- Nationality: United Kingdom
- Born: Jonathan Hall; 13 March 1982 (age 44) Doncaster, South Yorkshire
- Spouse: Lindsay Hall (2002-present)

Sport
- Country: Great Britain
- Sport: Wheelchair Basketball
- Disability: Spina Bifida
- Retired: 2016

Achievements and titles
- Paralympic finals: 2008, 2012

Jonathan Hall (born 13 March 1982) is a British wheelchair basketball player. He was selected to play for Team GB in the 2012 Summer Paralympics in London. He is classed as a 3.0 wheelchair basketball player. He won bronze at the 2008 Summer Paralympics in Beijing.

== Personal life ==
Jonathan Hall was born in Doncaster, South Yorkshire on 13 March 1982 with spina bifida, a developmental congenital disorder caused by the incomplete closing of the embryonic neural tube. He married his wife, Lindsay Hall, in 2002. He currently lives in Chesterfield, Derbyshire.

== Wheelchair basketball ==
Hall was first introduced to wheelchair basketball at the age of 14 at the National Junior Games held in Stoke Mandeville. He has played the sport ever since. Hall initially played for the Sheffield Steelers then joined the Wolverhampton Rhinos. He played with the team for three years. He joined the Tameside Owls in the 2011–2012 season. Hall captained the GB Junior wheelchair basketball team at the 2005 World Junior Championships, and also won gold in that same junior team. He joined the senior wheelchair basketball team at the age of 19. He has represented Great Britain six times in the senior team.

Hall has only competed in four major championships. The first was the 2008 Summer Paralympic Games held in Beijing, China. Along with his team, he won bronze; coming third place. The following year, he competed in the 2009 European Championships held in Adana, Turkey. He won bronze in this championship. In 2010 he competed in the 2010 World Wheelchair Basketball Championships, held on home ground in Birmingham. Along with his team, he finished in fifth position. 2011 saw a victory in the 2011 European Championships in Nazareth, northern Israel. He won gold, along with his team.
