= Lantz Lamback =

American Paralympic swimmer

Personal information
- Nationality: USA
- Born: June 30, 1986 (age 40) Augusta, Georgia
- Education: Augusta State
- Occupation: Coaching
- Height: 6 ft (183 cm)
- Spouse: Ashley Owens

Sport
- Sport: Para swimming
- Disability class: S7
- Club: Aiken-Augusta Swim Club; Georgia Blazers
- Coached by: Andy Collins (Georgia Blazers); Fred Lambeck III (Father)
Medal record
Paralympic Games
Men's swimming
Representing United States
Paralympic Games
Gold medal – first place	2008 Beijing	100 metre backstroke S7
Gold medal – first place	2012 London	50 metre freestyle S7
Bronze medal – third place	2012 London	100 metre freestyle S7

Lantz Lamback (born June 30, 1986) is an American para swimmer, specializing in freestyle and backstroke events, who won a total of 8 medals in Paralympic Games competition, including 2 gold medals, 2 silver medals and 4 bronze medals. He competed at the 2004 Summer Olympics in Athens, the 2008 Summer Paralympics in Beijing, and the 2012 Summer Paralympics in London. He married fellow Paralympic Games gold medalist Ashley Owens in 2023.

== Early life ==
Lamback was born into a large extended family on June 30, 1986 to Fred Lambeck III and Dona Lantz Lamback in Augusta, Georgia. Lantz's father Fred, who died in December, 2025, was an athlete, advocate and coach for swimmers with disabilities. Lantz suffered from cerebral palsy from a very early age which affected the use of his legs and affected his balance and coordination. Lamback started swimming as therapy, and showed natural ability and marked improvement as his strength developed. Growing up, Lantz attended meets where his father was coaching disabled athletes and benefitted from observing the skills, knowledge, focus, and patience his father took with his swimmers. Discovering his aptitude for swimming, Lamback began practicing with the Aiken-Augusta Swim League, often training and competing beside able bodied swimmers.

At 15, in 2001 Lamback competed with the Georgia Blazers, part of Blaze Sports, a competitive team for athletes with disabilities. Lamback was managed by swim coach Andy Collins with the Blazers, and head coach Wendy Gumbert. The Blazers were part of the U.S. Disabled Athlete Fund, with members picked annually. In August, 2001, representing the Georgia Blazers, Lamback set a total of seven nation-wide records, and won a silver medal at the Junior National Swimming Championships. Blaze Sports started the Georgia team in March, 2001.

At the U.S. Paralympic Spring Championships on March 25-27, 2010, he won the 100 freestyle with a time of 1:04.92, the 50 freestyle with a time of 30.17, and the 100 backstroke with a time of 1:15.75.

== World Championships ==
Lamback competed in the World Championships in 2002, 2006, and 2010. He won a total of 4 bronze and 3 silver medals in the 2006 and 2010 World Championships. In 2010, he won a silver medal in the 50 meter freestyle event, and bronze medals in the 100 meter backstroke and the 100 meter freestyle. In the 2006 world championships he won silver medals in the 50 meter and 100 meter freestyle events and bronze medals in the 100 meter backstroke, and 4x100 meter medley relay.

== Paralympic Games ==
Lamback competed in three Paralympic Games, in the S7 disability category. He won a total of 8 medals in Paralympic Games competition, including 2 gold medals, 2 silver medals and 4 bronze medals. At the 2004 Paralympic Games in Athens, he won a bronze in the Men's 50-meter Freestyle with a time of 29.71 and the 100 meter Freestyle with a time of 1:05.02. At the 2008 Paralympic Games in Beijing, he won a gold in the 100 meter backstroke, a silver in the 100 meter and 400 meter freestyle, and a bronze in the 50 meter freestyle. At the 2012 Paralympic Games in London, he won a gold in the 50 meter freestyle, and a bronze in the 100 meter freestyle.

Since retiring from high level competition, beginning in 2016, Lamback worked as a coach at the Augusta Aquatic Center's CSRA Swimming and Diving age-group program. At CSRA, Lamback developed swimming programs that focus on basic skills and carefully researched stroke methods for swimmers of many levels of ability.
