= Matthew Whorwood =

British Paralympic swimmer (born 1989)

Personal information
- Full name: Matthew Whorwood
- Nationality: English
- Born: 9 December 1989 (age 36) Truro, England

Sport
- Sport: Swimming
- Club: Swansea HPC
Medal record
Representing Great Britain
Swimming
Paralympic Games
Bronze medal – third place	2008 Beijing	Men's 400m Freestyle (S6)
Bronze medal – third place	2008 Beijing	Men's 100m Breaststroke (SB6)
Bronze medal – third place	2012 London	Men's 400 metre freestyle S6
IPC European Championships
Silver medal – second place	2009 Reykjavik	4x50m medley relay 20pts
Bronze medal – third place	2009 Reykjavik	100 m backstroke – SB6
Bronze medal – third place	2009 Reykjavik	200 m ind. medley – SM6

Matthew Whorwood (born 9 December 1989) is a British Paralympic swimmer. Whorwood, who swims mainly in S6 events has competed in two Paralympic Games winning three bronze medals in freestyle and breastroke events.

== Career history ==
Whorwood was born in Truro in Cornwall in 1989. Whorwood, who has Achondroplasia, started swimming at his local club at the age of 12. He later joined Newquay Surf Life Saving and from there got involved in competitive swimming.

Whorwood represented Great Britain in the 2006 IPC Swimming World Championships, winning two silver medals in the 400m freestyle and 200m individual medley. His results since 2006 saw him qualify again for the British team, this time in the 2008 Summer Paralympics. There, on his Paralympic debut, he finished third in the S6 400m freestyle and the SB6 100m breaststroke. At Beijing he also swam in the 200m individual medley SM6 (4th), 100m freestyle S6 (6th) and 50m freestyle S6 (11th).

In 2009 Whorwood won silver (50m freestyle) and bronze (200m individual medley) medals at the British Championships and took a bronze (200m Individual Medley) at the 2009 BT Paralympic World Cup. Despite failing to medal at the 2009 British International Disability Swimming Championships, Whorwood won three bronze and a silver medal at the IPC European Championships in Reykjavik. In 2010 Whorwood successfully defended his IPC Swimming World Championship 400m freestyle silver medal and took silver in the 100m freestyle at the British Championships.

He did not attend the 2011 European Championships, but did collect a silver in individual medley at the 2011 Paralympic World Cup in Manchester. Although he did not medal at the 2012 British Championships, he more importantly swam under qualification time for the Great Britain team to take his place in the 2012 Summer Paralympics.

At the Summer Paralympics in London, Whorwood qualified through his first heat in third place in the 400m freestyle with a time of 5:17.28. On 1 September, in the final, he bettered that time with a result of 5:11.59 taking the bronze medal.
