= United States at the 2008 Summer Paralympics =

- Flag of the United States
- IPC code: USA
- NPC: United States Paralympic Committee
- Website: www.teamusa.org/US-Paralympics

in Beijing
- Competitors: 213 in 18 sports
- Flag bearers: Jennifer Armbruster (opening); Melissa Stockwell (closing)
- Medals Ranked 3rd: Gold 36 Silver 35 Bronze 28 Total 99

Summer Paralympics appearances (overview)
- 1960; 1964; 1968; 1972; 1976; 1980; 1984; 1988; 1992; 1996; 2000; 2004; 2008; 2012; 2016; 2020; 2024

The United States sent a delegation to compete at the 2008 Summer Paralympics in Beijing, China. A total of 213 U.S. competitors took part in 18 sports; the only 2 sports Americans did not compete in were soccer 5-a-side and 7-a-side. The American delegation included 16 former members of the U.S. military, including 3 veterans of the Iraq War. Among them were shot putter Scott Winkler, who was paralyzed in an accident in Iraq, and swimmer Melissa Stockwell, a former United States Army officer who lost her left leg to a roadside bomb in the war.

The United States finished third in the gold and overall medal count, behind host nation China and Great Britain. The finish was an improvement from the 2004 Paralympics, where the U.S. finished fourth in the gold and overall medal count. The U.S. saw significant gains in Paralympic swimming, winning 17 gold medals and 44 total medals, 9 more than they took home from Athens. U.S. swimmers set a total of 16 world records, 23 Paralympic records, 48 Pan American records and 99 American records. U.S. coverage of the Games was provided by the Universal Sports Television Network and the official website of the U.S. Paralympic Team.

== Disability classifications ==
Every participant at the Paralympics had their disability grouped into one of five disability categories: amputation (either congenital or sustained through injury or illness); cerebral palsy; wheelchair athletes (often overlapping with other categories); visual impairment (including blindness); and les autres (any physical disability that does not fall strictly under one of the other categories, for example dwarfism or multiple sclerosis). Each Paralympic sport then had its own classifications, depending on the specific physical demands of the competition. Events were given a code, made of numbers and letters, describing the type of event and classification of the athletes competing. Some sports, such as athletics, divided athletes by both the category and severity of their disabilities. Other sports, such as swimming, grouped competitors from different categories together, the only separation being based on the severity of the disability.

Athletes may have competed against individuals with different classifications in the same event. For example, track and field athlete Jim Bob Bizzell competed in the men's 200 meters T44; the prefix T designated a track event and 44 was the disability classification. Although he finished behind Oscar Pistorius (competing under the T43 class), Bizell set a world record in the T44 classification. For specific classification information, see the pages for individual sports at 2008 Summer Paralympics#Sports.

== Medalists ==
The following American athletes won medals at the games; all dates are for September 2008. In the 'by discipline' sections below, medalists' names are in bold.

Medal	Name	Sport	Event	Date
Gold	Jim Bob Bizzell; Brian Frasure; Jerome Singleton; Casey Tibbs	Athletics	Men's 4x100 m relay T42-T46	16
Gold	Jeremy Campbell	Athletics	Men's discus throw F44	15
Gold	Jeremy Campbell	Athletics	Men's pentathlon P44	11
Gold	Jessica Galli	Athletics	Women's 400 m T53	10
Gold	Josh George	Athletics	Men's 100 m T53	16
Gold	April Holmes	Athletics	Women's 100 m T44	14
Gold	Josiah Jamison	Athletics	Men's 100 m T12	10
Gold	Amanda McGrory	Athletics	Women's 5000 m T54	12
Gold	Jeff Skiba	Athletics	Men's high jump F44/46	14
Gold	Barbara Buchan	Cycling	Women's individual time trial LC 3/LC 4/CP 3	12
Gold	Barbara Buchan	Cycling	Women's individual pursuit LC 3-4/CP 3	10
Gold	Oz Sanchez	Cycling	Men's individual time trial HC C	12
Gold	Jennifer Schuble	Cycling	Women's 500 m time trial LC1-2/CP 4	08
Gold	Karissa Whitsell; Mackenzie Woodring	Cycling	Women's individual time trial B&VI 1-3	12
Gold	United States women's national goalball team Jen Armbruster; Lisa Banta; Jackie Barnes; Jessie Lorenz; Asya Miller; Robin Theryoung	Goalball	Women's competition	14
Gold	Maureen McKinnon-Tucker; Nick Scandone	Sailing	2-person keelboat	13
Gold	Kelley Becherer	Swimming	Women's 50 m freestyle S13	15
Gold	Anna Eames	Swimming	Women's 100 m butterfly S10	08
Gold	Rudy Garcia-Tolson	Swimming	Men's 200 m individual medley SM7	07
Gold	Cortney Jordan	Swimming	Women's 50 m freestyle S7	14
Gold	Lantz Lamback	Swimming	Men's 100 m backstroke S7	10
Gold	Jessica Long	Swimming	Women's 100 m freestyle S8	08
Gold	Jessica Long	Swimming	Women's 100 m butterfly S8	07
Gold	Jessica Long	Swimming	Women's 200 m individual medley SM8	11
Gold	Jessica Long	Swimming	Women's 400 m freestyle S8	12
Gold	Ashley Owens	Swimming	Women's 100 m freestyle S10	09
Gold	Roy Perkins	Swimming	Men's 50 m butterfly S5	10
Gold	Erin Popovich	Swimming	Women's 100 m freestyle S7	08
Gold	Erin Popovich	Swimming	Women's 100 m breaststroke SB7	09
Gold	Erin Popovich	Swimming	Women's 200 m individual medley SM7	07
Gold	Erin Popovich	Swimming	Women's 400 m freestyle S7	11
Gold	Miranda Uhl	Swimming	Women's 200 m individual medley SM6	07
Gold	Justin Zook	Swimming	Men's 100 m backstroke S10	13
Gold	United States women's national wheelchair basketball team: Sarah Castle; Patty Cisneros; Loraine Gonzales; Carlee Hoffman; Emily Hoskins; Mary Allison Milford; Rebecca Murray; Alana Nichols; Christina Ripp; Jen Ruddell; Natalie Schneider; Stephanie Wheeler	Wheelchair basketball	Women's competition	15
Gold	United States national wheelchair rugby team: Andy Cohn; Will Groulx; Scott Hogsett; Bryan Kirkland; Norm Lyduch; Seth McBride; Jason Regier; Nick Springer; Chance Sumner; Joel Wilmoth; Mark Zupan	Wheelchair rugby	Mixed competition	16
Gold	Nick Taylor; David Wagner	Wheelchair tennis	Mixed doubles	13
Silver	Jim Bob Bizzell	Athletics	Men's 400 m T44	16
Silver	Jim Bob Bizzell	Athletics	Men's 200 m T44	13
Silver	Jessica Galli	Athletics	Women's 100 m T53	12
Silver	Jessica Galli	Athletics	Women's 200 m T53	15
Silver	Jessica Galli	Athletics	Women's 800 m T53	15
Silver	Josh George	Athletics	Men's 800 m T53	15
Silver	Lex Gillette	Athletics	Men's long jump F11	15
Silver	Peter Gottwald, Jr.	Athletics	Men's 800 m T13	15
Silver	Tatyana McFadden	Athletics	Women's 200 m T54	14
Silver	Tatyana McFadden	Athletics	Women's 400 m T54	12
Silver	Tatyana McFadden	Athletics	Women's 800 m T54	14
Silver	Amanda McGrory	Athletics	Women's marathon T54	17
Silver	Jerome Singleton	Athletics	Men's 100 m T44	09
Silver	Jeff Skiba	Athletics	Men's pentathlon P44	11
Silver	Alejandro Albor	Cycling	Men's individual road race HC C	14
Silver	Allison Jones	Cycling	Women's individual time trial LC 3/LC 4/CP 3	12
Silver	Jennifer Schuble	Cycling	Women's individual time trial LC 1/LC 2/CP 4	12
Silver	Jennifer Schuble	Cycling	Women's individual pursuit LC 1-2/CP 4	10
Silver	Karissa Whitsell; Mackenzie Woodring	Cycling	Women's individual road race B&VI 1-3	14
Silver	Simona Chin; Jamie Dean; Jesse Karmazin; Emma Preuschl; Tracy Tackett	Rowing	Mixed coxed four	11
Silver	Cheryl Angelelli	Swimming	Women's 100 m freestyle S4	07
Silver	Cheryl Angelelli	Swimming	Women's 50 m freestyle S4	15
Silver	Amanda Everlove	Swimming	Women's 100 m butterfly S8	07
Silver	Amanda Everlove	Swimming	Women's 200 m individual medley SM8	11
Silver	Amanda Everlove	Swimming	Women's 50 m freestyle S8	14
Silver	Cortney Jordan	Swimming	Women's 100 m freestyle S7	08
Silver	Cortney Jordan	Swimming	Women's 400 m freestyle S7	11
Silver	Lantz Lamback	Swimming	Men's 100 m freestyle S7	08
Silver	Lantz Lamback	Swimming	Men's 400 m freestyle S7	11
Silver	Jessica Long	Swimming	Women's 100 m backstroke S8	10
Silver	Ashley Owens	Swimming	Women's 400 m freestyle S10	15
Silver	Erin Popovich	Swimming	Women's 50 m butterfly S7	13
Silver	Erin Popovich	Swimming	Women's 50 m freestyle S7	14
Silver	Elizabeth Stone	Swimming	Women's 100 m backstroke S9	13
Silver	United States women's national sitting volleyball team: Allison Aldrich; Heather Erickson; Alexandra Gouldie; Katie Holloway; Sugui Kriss; Kendra Lancaster; Hope Lewellen; Brenda Maymon; Gina McWilliams; Nichole Millage; Kari Miller; Lora Webster	Volleyball	Women's competition	14
Bronze	Lindsey Carmichael	Archery	Women's individual recurve standing	13
Bronze	Jeff Fabry	Archery	Men's individual compound W1	14
Bronze	Anjali Forber-Pratt	Athletics	Women's 400 m T53	10
Bronze	Anjali Forber-Pratt; Jessica Galli; Tatyana McFadden; Amanda McGrory	Athletics	Women's 4x100 m relay T53/T54	16
Bronze	Brian Frasure	Athletics	Men's 100 m T44	09
Bronze	Amanda McGrory	Athletics	Women's 800 m T53	15
Bronze	Casey Tibbs	Athletics	Men's long jump F42/44	16
Bronze	Alejandro Albor	Cycling	Men's individual time trial HC C	12
Bronze	Oz Sanchez	Cycling	Men's individual road race HC C	14
Bronze	Karissa Whitsell; Mackenzie Woodring	Cycling	Women's individual pursuit B&VI 1-3	09
Bronze	Anthony Zahn	Cycling	Men's individual time trial LC4	12
Bronze	Greg Dewall	Judo	Men's +100 kg	09
Bronze	Laura Schwanger	Rowing	Women's single sculls A	11
Bronze	John Ruf	Sailing	1-person keelboat	13
Bronze	Kelley Becherer	Swimming	Women's 100 m freestyle S13	10
Bronze	Kelley Becherer	Swimming	Women's 400 m freestyle S13	08
Bronze	Aimee Bruder	Swimming	Women's 100 m freestyle S4	07
Bronze	Cody Bureau	Swimming	Men's 200 m individual medley SM9	11
Bronze	Anna Eames	Swimming	Women's 100 m freestyle S10	09
Bronze	Rudy Garcia-Tolson	Swimming	Men's 100 m breaststroke SB7	09
Bronze	Deborah Gruen	Swimming	Women's 100 m breaststroke SB6	12
Bronze	Cortney Jordan	Swimming	Women's 200 m individual medley SM7	07
Bronze	Lantz Lamback	Swimming	Men's 50 m freestyle S7	14
Bronze	Jessica Long	Swimming	Women's 100 m breaststroke SB7	09
Bronze	Roy Perkins	Swimming	Men's 100 m freestyle S5	07
Bronze	Jarrett Perry	Swimming	Men's 100 m backstroke S9	13
Bronze	Susan Beth Scott	Swimming	Women's 400 m freestyle S10	15
Bronze	David Wagner	Wheelchair tennis	Mixed singles	13

**Medals by sport**
**Sport**	Gold medal	Silver medal	Bronze medal	**Total**
Archery	0	0	2	2
Track and field (athletics)	9	14	5	28
Cycling	5	5	4	14
Goalball	1	0	0	1
Judo	0	0	1	1
Rowing	0	1	1	2
Sailing	1	0	1	2
Swimming	17	14	13	44
Volleyball	0	1	0	1
Wheelchair basketball	1	0	0	1
Wheelchair rugby	1	0	0	1
Wheelchair tennis	1	0	1	2

**Multiple medalists**
**Name**	**Sport**	Gold medal	Silver medal	Bronze medal	**Total**
Erin Popovich	Swimming	4	2	0	6
Jessica Long	Swimming	4	1	1	6
Barbara Buchan	Cycling	2	0	0	2
Jeremy Campbell	Athletics	2	0	0	2
Jessica Galli	Athletics	1	3	1	5
Cortney Jordan	Swimming	1	2	1	4
Lantz Lamback	Swimming	1	2	1	4
Jim Bob Bizzell	Athletics	1	2	0	3
Jennifer Schuble	Cycling	1	2	0	3
Amanda McGrory	Athletics	1	1	2	4
Karissa Whitsell	Cycling	1	1	1	3
Mackenzie Woodring	Cycling	1	1	1	3
Josh George	Athletics	1	1	0	2
Ashley Owens	Swimming	1	1	0	2
Jerome Singleton	Athletics	1	1	0	2
Jeff Skiba	Athletics	1	1	0	2
Kelley Becherer	Swimming	1	0	2	3
Anna Eames	Swimming	1	0	1	2
Brian Frasure	Athletics	1	0	1	2
Rudy Garcia-Tolson	Swimming	1	0	1	2
Roy Perkins	Swimming	1	0	1	2
Oz Sanchez	Cycling	1	0	1	2
Casey Tibbs	Athletics	1	0	1	2
David Wagner	Wheelchair tennis	1	0	1	2
Tatyana McFadden	Athletics	0	3	1	4
Amanda Everlove	Swimming	0	3	0	3
Cheryl Angelelli	Swimming	0	2	0	2
Alejandro Albor	Cycling	0	1	1	2
Anjali Forber-Pratt	Athletics	0	0	2	2

== Archery ==
The American archery team consisted of seven men and one woman. The highest placed finishers were Lindsey Carmichael and Jeff Fabry, who each won a bronze medal. T. J. Pemberton and Joe Bailey competed against each other in the quarterfinals of the men's individual compound open, with Pemberton winning and going on to finish fourth in that event.

Athlete	Event	Ranking round		Round of 32	Round of 16	Quarterfinals	Semifinals	Final	
Athlete	Event	Points	Seed	Opposition Result	Opposition Result	Opposition Result	Opposition Result	Opposition Result	Rank
Joe Bailey	Men's individual compound open	676	6	Bye	Kallunki (FIN); W 115:110	Pemberton (USA); L 112:114	did not advance		
Eric Bennett	Men's individual compound open	667	16	Kweon (KOR); W 106:106 T9:9,9:8	Stubbs (GBR); L 114:117	did not advance			
Lindsey Carmichael	Women's individual recurve standing	536	13	Wang (CHN); W 89:82	Comte (SUI); W 87:76	Kim (KOR); W 86:85	Lee (KOR); L 101:101 T7:6	Olejnik (POL); W 105:101	Bronze medal
Jeff Fabry	Men's individual compound W1	661	2	N/A	Bye	Azzolini (ITA); W 113:97 PR	Cavanagh (GBR); L 107:109	Kinnunen (FIN); W 111:101	Bronze medal
Chuck Lear	Men's individual compound W1	577	12	N/A	Murphy (CAN); L 75:98	did not advance			
T. J. Pemberton	Men's individual compound open	668	14	Vangen (NOR); W 106:103	Stevens (GBR); W 115:105	Bailey (USA); W 114:112	Simonelli (ITA); L 110:116	Horner (SUI); L 111:115	4
Kevin Stone	Men's individual recurve W1/W2	616	10	Dror (ISR); W 92:88	Vitale (ITA); L 97:101	did not advance			
Russell Wolfe	Men's individual recurve W1/W2	539	29	De Pellegrin (ITA); L 76:107	did not advance				

== Track and field (athletics) ==
The American track and field team consisted of 26 men and 17 women. Among them was shot putter Scott Winkler, a U.S. Army veteran who was paralyzed in Tikrit, Iraq in 2003 after he fell off a truck while holding 50 pounds of ammunition. The team set six world records and won a total of nine gold, fourteen silver, and five bronze medals, two more medals than the team won in Athens. Jessica Galli won five medals, more than any other team member, while Amanda McGrory, Tatyana McFadden, and Jim Bob Bizzell each won at least three medals. Jeremy Campbell was the only U.S. track and field athlete to win two golds.

Men

Athlete	Event	Heat		Semifinal		Final	
Athlete	Event	Result	Rank	Result	Rank	Result	Rank
Danny Andrews	200 m T44	24.22	3 Q	N/A		23.54	5
Danny Andrews	400 m T44	N/A				53.15	4
Jim Bob Bizzell	200 m T44	23.22	1 Q	N/A		22.62 WR	Silver medal
Jim Bob Bizzell	400 m T44	N/A				50.98 WR	Silver medal
Adam Bleakney	400 m T53	59.29	7	N/A		did not advance	
Adam Bleakney	800 m T53	1:40.94	3	N/A		did not advance	
Adam Bleakney	5000 m T54	10:53.56	6	N/A		did not advance	
Adam Bleakney	Marathon T54	N/A				1:30.36	23
Matt Brown	Discus throw F42	N/A				42.25	4
Matt Brown	Shot put F42	N/A				12.46	8
Tyler Byers	800 m T54	1:38.73	4 Q	1:41.00	6	did not advance	
Tyler Byers	1500 m T54	3:10.00	4 Q	3:06.47	8	did not advance	
Tyler Byers	5000 m T54	11:01.63	9	N/A		did not advance	
Tyler Byers	Marathon T54	N/A				1:32.33	24
Jeremy Campbell	Long jump F42/44	N/A				6.36	4
Jeremy Campbell	Discus throw F44	N/A				55.08	Gold medal
Jeremy Campbell	Pentathlon P44	N/A				4662 WR	Gold medal
Ed Cochrell	Shot put F44	N/A				14.16	6
Scott Danberg	Shot put F40	N/A				9.79	8
Brian Frasure	100 m T44	11.49	1 Q	N/A		11.50	Bronze medal
Josh George	100 m T53	15.17	1 Q	N/A		14.79	Gold medal
Josh George	200 m T53	26.81	3 Q	N/A		26.98	4
Josh George	400 m T53	53.58	3	N/A		did not advance	
Josh George	800 m T53	1:38.30 PR	1 Q	N/A		1:37.09	Silver medal
Josh George	1500 m T54	3:13.87	1 Q	3:11.09	5	did not advance	
Josh George	Marathon T54	N/A				1:30.29	17
Lex Gillette	100 m T11	11.85	3	did not advance			
Lex Gillette	200 m T11	24.42	4	did not advance			
Lex Gillette	Long jump F11	N/A				6.46	Silver medal
Lex Gillette	Triple jump F11	N/A				12.19	5
Peter Gottwald	800 m T13	N/A				1:55.49	Silver medal
Peter Gottwald	1500 m T13	4:05.51	4 Q	N/A		4:16.59	10
Peter Gottwald	5000 m T13	16:11.31	6	N/A		did not advance	
Erik Hightower	100 m T54	14.92	6	N/A		did not advance	
Erik Hightower	200 m T54	26.15	5	N/A		did not advance	
Erik Hightower	400 m T54	49.76	5 Q	51.67	5	did not advance	
Tony Iniguez	800 m T54	1:39.72	5 Q	1:37.30	9	did not advance	
Tony Iniguez	1500 m T54	3:07.84	2 Q	3:11.84	6	did not advance	
Tony Iniguez	5000 m T54	10:28.87	9	N/A		did not advance	
Tony Iniguez	Marathon T54	N/A				1:26.04	15
Josiah Jamison	100 m T12	11.09	1 Q	10.90	1 Q	10.89	Gold medal
Josiah Jamison	200 m T12	22.20	1 Q	22.19	1 Q	did not start	
Josiah Jamison	400 m T12	51.40	3	did not advance			
Carlos Leon	Shot put F53/54	N/A				6.95	15
Royal Mitchell	100 m T13	11.34	3 Q	N/A		11.17	7
Royal Mitchell	200 m T13	22.73	4	N/A		did not advance	
Royal Mitchell	400 m T13	51.15	4 Q	N/A		51.23	8
Nelacey Porter	100 m T11	Disqualified		did not advance			
Josh Roberts	100 m T52	N/A				19.88	7
Josh Roberts	200 m T52	N/A				36.82	9
Josh Roberts	400 m T52	1:05.22	5	N/A		did not advance	
Josh Roberts	800 m T52	2:21.10	5	N/A		did not advance	
Scot Severn	Discus throw F53/54	N/A				23.71	7
Scot Severn	Shot put F53/54	N/A				7.76	9
Marlon Shirley	100 m T44	11.77	2 Q	N/A		34.43	8
Jerome Singleton	100 m T44	11.48	2 Q	N/A		11.20	Silver medal
Jeff Skiba	High jump F44/46	N/A				2.11 WR	Gold medal
Jeff Skiba	Long jump F42/44	N/A				5.83	9
Jeff Skiba	Discus throw F44	N/A				48.72	6
Jeff Skiba	Javelin throw F42/44	N/A				51.46	5
Jeff Skiba	Pentathlon P44	N/A				4274	Silver medal
Casey Tibbs	200 m T44	24.01	2 Q	N/A		23.40	4
Casey Tibbs	400 m T44	N/A				did not start	
Casey Tibbs	Long jump F42/44	N/A				6.39	Bronze medal
Casey Tibbs	Pentathlon P44	N/A				did not finish	
Steven Toyoji	400 m T52	1:04.37	4 Q	N/A		1:05.41	7
Steven Toyoji	800 m T52	Disqualified		N/A		did not advance	
Steven Toyoji	Marathon T52	N/A				1:58.37	5
Scott Winkler	Shot put F55/56	N/A				11.27	5
Lex Gillette; Josiah Jamison; Royal Mitchell; Nelacey Porter	4×100 m relay T11-13	did not finish		N/A		did not advance	
Jim Bob Bizzell; Brian Frasure; Jerome Singleton; Casey Tibbs	4×100 m relay T42-46	N/A				42.75 WR	Gold medal
	4×100 m relay T53/54	did not start					
Tyler Byers; Josh George; Erik Hightower; Tony Iniguez	4×400 m relay T53/54	3:21.52	2	N/A		did not advance	

Legend: Q – Qualifiers for the final as decided on a basis of rank within heat; WR=World Record; PR=Paralympic Record

Women

Athlete	Event	Heat		Semifinal		Final	
Athlete	Event	Result	Rank	Result	Rank	Result	Rank
Mallerie Badgett	100 m T52	N/A				24.01	6
Mallerie Badgett	200 m T52	N/A				43.42	7
Cheri Blauwet	400 m T53	1:00.03	1 Q	N/A		57.07	4
Cheri Blauwet	800 m T53	N/A				1:58.38	4
Cheri Blauwet	5000 m T54	N/A				12:29.43	4
Cheri Blauwet	Marathon T54	N/A				1:40:04	5
Julie Crisp	Javelin throw F35-38	N/A				18.84	17
Anjali Forber Pratt	100 m T53	17.46	1 Q	N/A		17.99	6
Anjali Forber Pratt	200 m T53	31.66	2 Q	N/A		30.99	4
Anjali Forber Pratt	400 m T53	58.76	3 Q	N/A		56.79	Bronze medal
Jessica Galli	100 m T53	17.00	2 Q	N/A		16.88	Silver medal
Jessica Galli	200 m T53	30.58	2 Q	N/A		29.68	Silver medal
Jessica Galli	400 m T53	56.10 PR	1 Q	N/A		54.88 WR	Gold medal
Jessica Galli	800 m T53	N/A				1:57.25	Silver medal
Jessica Galli	1500 m T54	3:30.32	3 Q	N/A		3:41.68	4
Jennifer Goeckel	100 m T54	18.21	5	N/A		did not advance	
Jennifer Goeckel	200 m T54	32.84	4	N/A		did not advance	
Jennifer Goeckel	400 m T54	1:01.11	6	N/A		did not advance	
Sabra Hawkes	100 m T37	15.75	8	N/A		did not advance	
Sabra Hawkes	200 m T37	32.36	6	N/A		did not advance	
April Holmes	100 m T44	13.76	1 Q	N/A		13.72	Gold medal
April Holmes	200 m T44	N/A				Disqualified	
April Holmes	Long jump F44	N/A				did not start	
Jill Kennedy	Discus throw F40	N/A				20.89	6
Jill Kennedy	Shot put F40	N/A				6.39	8
Cheryl Leitner	100 m T52	N/A				24.40	7
Cheryl Leitner	200 m T52	N/A				41.01	6
Chelsea McClammer	800 m T54	1:57.09	5 Q	N/A		1:51.88	8
Tatyana McFadden	100 m T54	16.71	3 Q	N/A		16.62	6
Tatyana McFadden	200 m T54	29.49	2 Q	N/A		28.43	Silver medal
Tatyana McFadden	400 m T54	54.04	2 Q	N/A		53.49	Silver medal
Tatyana McFadden	800 m T54	1:56.56	1 Q	N/A		1:46.95	Silver medal
Amanda McGrory	800 m T53	N/A				1:57.31	Bronze medal
Amanda McGrory	1500 m T54	3:34.56	2 Q	N/A		3:42.17	5
Amanda McGrory	5000 m T54	N/A				12:29.07	Gold medal
Amanda McGrory	Marathon T54	N/A				1:40:00	Silver medal
Kerri Morgan	100 m T52	N/A				21.56	5
Kerri Morgan	200 m T52	N/A				40.82	5
Maggie Redden	100 m T53	19.29	5	N/A		did not advance	
Maggie Redden	200 m T53	35.13	6	N/A		did not advance	
Shirley Reilly	1500 m T54	3:33.33	5 Q	N/A		3:43.54	7
Shirley Reilly	5000 m T54	N/A				12:32.19	8
Shirley Reilly	Marathon T54	N/A				1:40:26	7
Robyn Stawski	Discus throw F32-34/51-53	N/A				11.24	15
Robyn Stawski	Javelin throw F33-34/52-53	N/A				11.50	14
Robyn Stawski	Shot put F32-34/52-53	N/A				5.56	13
Anjali Forber Pratt; Jessica Galli; Tatyana McFadden; Amanda McGrory	4×100 m relay T53/54	N/A				1:02.16	Bronze medal

Legend: Q – Qualifiers for the final as decided on a basis of rank within heat; WR=World Record; PR=Paralympic Record

== Boccia ==
The U.S. boccia team consisted of a single competitor, T. J. Hawker. Hawker lost his four pool stage matches and did not advance to the knock-out stage.

Athlete	Event	Pool play		Quarterfinals	Semifinals	Final	
Athlete	Event	W–L	Rank	Opposition Result	Opposition Result	Opposition Result	Rank
T. J. Hawker	Individual BC1	0–4	5	did not advance			

== Cycling ==
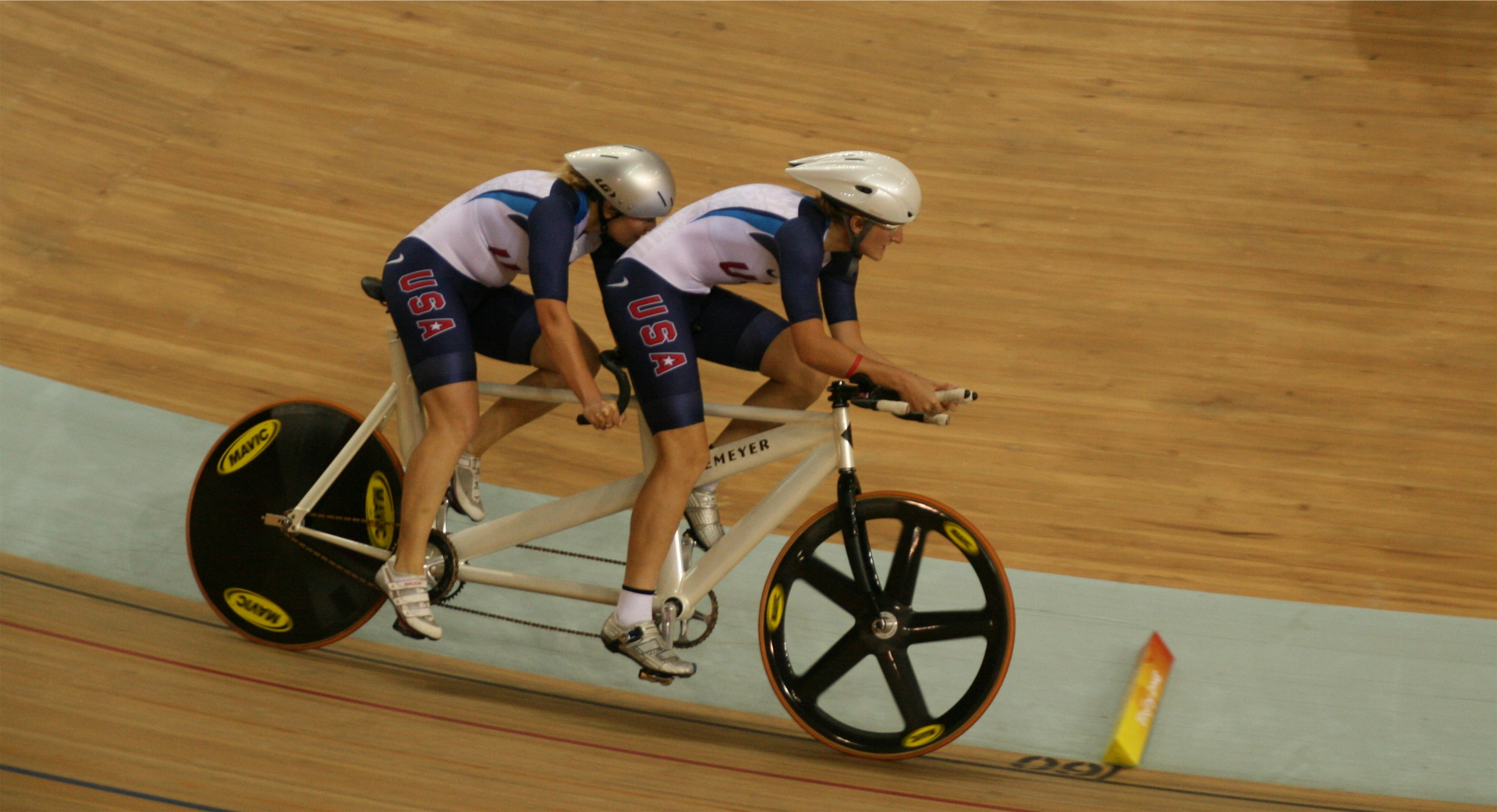
Karissa Whitsell and Mackenzie Woodring (pilot) compete in Beijing on September 07, 2008

The initial members of the 2008 U.S. Paralympic Cycling Team were named on June 6, 2008, after the 2008 U.S. Paralympics Cycling National Championships in Morrison, Colorado. The final roster included thirteen athletes (seven men and six women). The team entered the Games with a goal of two gold and ten medals total. They surpassed their goal, finishing with fourteen medals: five gold, five silver, and four bronze.

Factor time

To ensure a fair event when athletes with differing disabilities compete, times achieved were sometimes modified by a percentage rate, to produce a result known as "Factor Time". It is this time that decided the result of the races, and is listed below. Where this differs from the actual time recorded, actual time is also listed.

=== Road ===
Men

Athlete	Event	Time	Rank
Alejandro Albor	ind. road race HC C	2:01:44	Silver medal
Alejandro Albor	ind. time trial HC C	20:59.49	Bronze medal
Michael Farrell	ind. road race LC1/LC2/CP4	2:01:58	28
Michael Farrell	ind. time trial CP4	38:14.76	7
David Lee	ind. road race HC B	1:38:09	14
David Lee	ind. time trial HC B	25:04.99	14
Oz Sanchez	ind. road race HC C	1:21:41	Bronze medal
Oz Sanchez	ind. time trial HC C	20:16.52	Gold medal
Matt Updike	ind. road race HC B	1:32:17	10
Matt Updike	ind. time trial HC B	24:39.59	13
Ron Williams	ind. road race LC1/LC2/CP4	2:01:44	25
Ron Williams	ind. time trial LC2	36:12.84	5
Anthony Zahn	ind. road race LC3/LC4/CP3	1:58:19	26
Anthony Zahn	ind. time trial LC4	41:08.21	Bronze medal

Women

Athlete	Event	Time	Rank
Barbara Buchan	ind. time trial LC 3/LC 4/CP 3	FT: 42:28.73; AT: 44:45.17	Gold medal
Allison Jones	ind. time trial LC 3/LC 4/CP 3	44:42.88	Silver medal
Greta Neimanas	ind. time trial LC 1/LC 2/CP 4	40:26.09	4
Jennifer Schuble	ind. time trial LC 1/LC 2/CP 4	FT: 38:38.94; AT: 40:42.28	Silver medal
Karissa Whitsell; Mackenzie Woodring (pilot)	ind. road race B&VI 1-3	1:58:35	Silver medal
Karissa Whitsell; Mackenzie Woodring (pilot)	ind. time trial B&VI 1-3	36:14.87	Gold medal

Key

- AT = actual time
- FT = factor time

=== Track ===
Men

Athlete	Event	Heats		Quarterfinals		Semifinals		Final	
Athlete	Event	Time	Rank	Time	Rank	Time	Rank	Time	Rank
Michael Farrell	ind. 1 km time trial CP4	N/A						1:17.594	8
Michael Farrell	ind. pursuit CP4	- 4:04.606	9	N/A				Did not advance	
Anthony Zahn	ind. road race LC3-4	N/A						FT: 1:29.280; AT: 1:33.275	20
Anthony Zahn	ind. pursuit LC4	Paolo Viganò (ITA); L 4.27.048	6	N/A				Did not advance	

Women

Athlete	Event	Heats		Final	
Athlete	Event	Time	Rank	Time	Rank
Barbara Buchan	ind. 500 m time trial LC3-4/CP 3	N/A		FT: 47.105; AT: 49.156	8
Barbara Buchan	ind. pursuit LC3-4/CP 3	Niu (CHN); W FT: 4:13.860; AT: 4:31.334 WR	1 Q	Simanowski (GER); W FT: 4:15.848; AT: 4:33.459	Gold medal
Allison Jones	ind. 500 m time trial LC3-4/CP 3	N/A		46.397	6
Allison Jones	ind. pursuit LC3-4/CP 3	Tesoriero (NZL); L 4:36.306	8	Did not advance	
Greta Neimanas	ind. 500 m time trial LC1-2/CP 4	N/A		40.265	8
Greta Neimanas	ind. pursuit LC1-2/CP 4	Storey (GBR); L 3:57.966	5	Did not advance	
Jennifer Schuble	ind. 500 m time trial LC1-2/CP 4	N/A		FT: 34.331; AT: 40.278 WR	Gold medal
Jennifer Schuble	ind. pursuit LC1-2/CP 4	Dong (CHN); W FT: 3:35.514; AT: 4:01.243 WR	1 Q	Storey (GBR); L FT: 3:36.867; AT: 4:02.758	Silver medal
Karissa Whitsell; Mackenzie Woodring (pilot)	ind. 1 km time trial B&VI 1-3	N/A		1:12:787	4
Karissa Whitsell; Mackenzie Woodring (pilot)	ind. pursuit B&VI 1-3	- 3:42.237	3 Q	(Bronze final); Farrell, Parsons (NZL); W 3:41.521	Bronze medal

Key

- Q = Qualified for next round
- WR = World record
- AT = actual time
- FT = factor time

== Equestrian ==
The only equestrian events held in the Paralympic Games are in the Dressage discipline. Five American riders competed, in both individual and team events.

Athlete	Horse	Event	Test round		Final round		Total	
Athlete	Horse	Event	Score	Rank	Score	Rank	Score	Rank
Robin Brueckmann	Radetzky	Ind. champ. test grade IV	N/A				56.387	14
Robin Brueckmann	Radetzky	Ind. freestyle test grade IV	N/A				61.135	11
Barbara Grassmyer	Mibis	Ind. champ. test grade III	N/A				57.120	10
Barbara Grassmyer	Mibis	Ind. freestyle test grade III	N/A				63.389	10
Rebecca Hart	Norteassa	Ind. champ. test grade II	N/A				62.545	12
Rebecca Hart	Norteassa	Ind. freestyle test grade II	N/A				68.110	4
Keith Newerla	Walk on the Moon	Ind. champ. test grade Ib	N/A				58.571	12
Keith Newerla	Walk on the Moon	Ind. freestyle test grade Ib	N/A				60.500	14
Lynn Seidemann	Rhett	Ind. champ. test grade Ib	N/A				63.905	6
Lynn Seidemann	Rhett	Ind. freestyle test grade Ib	N/A				64.221	9
Lynn Seidemann; Rebecca Hart; Barbara Grassmyer; Robin Brueckmann	Rhett; Norteassa; Mibis; Radetzky	Overall team	185.702; 64.471; 62.000; 59.231; 59.214	10	183.570; 63.905; 62.545; 57.120; 56.387	11	369.272	10

== Goalball ==
Goalball is a Paralympic sport played by athletes who are blind and visually impaired. At the 2008 Paralympics, the U.S. men's goalball team hoped to repeat their bronze medal performance in Athens, but lost to Sweden in the final. The U.S. women's goalball team improved on their silver medal performance in Athens, defeating China in the gold medal match.

Men

Squad list	Preliminaries		Quarterfinal	Semifinal	Final (Bronze medal match)	Rank
Squad list	Group B	Rank	Quarterfinal	Semifinal	Final (Bronze medal match)	Rank
Chris Dodds; Steve Denuyl; Tyler Merren; Donte' Mickens; Eddie Munro; Daryl Walker; Coach: Tom Parrigin	China; L 3-13	4 Q	Slovenia; W 4-2	China; L 0-4	Sweden; L 2-5	4
Chris Dodds; Steve Denuyl; Tyler Merren; Donte' Mickens; Eddie Munro; Daryl Walker; Coach: Tom Parrigin	Canada; L 2-8	4 Q	Slovenia; W 4-2	China; L 0-4	Sweden; L 2-5	4
Chris Dodds; Steve Denuyl; Tyler Merren; Donte' Mickens; Eddie Munro; Daryl Walker; Coach: Tom Parrigin	Brazil; W 6-4	4 Q	Slovenia; W 4-2	China; L 0-4	Sweden; L 2-5	4
Chris Dodds; Steve Denuyl; Tyler Merren; Donte' Mickens; Eddie Munro; Daryl Walker; Coach: Tom Parrigin	Iran; W 4-3	4 Q	Slovenia; W 4-2	China; L 0-4	Sweden; L 2-5	4
Chris Dodds; Steve Denuyl; Tyler Merren; Donte' Mickens; Eddie Munro; Daryl Walker; Coach: Tom Parrigin	Sweden; L 1-9	4 Q	Slovenia; W 4-2	China; L 0-4	Sweden; L 2-5	4

Women

Squad list	Preliminaries		Semifinal	Final	Rank
Squad list		Rank	Semifinal	Final	Rank
Jen Armbruster; Lisa Banta; Jackie Barnes; Jessie Lorenz; Asya Miller; Robin Theryoung; Coach: Ken Armbruster	Japan; W 2-0	2 Q	Denmark; W 4-3	China; W 6-5	Gold medal
Jen Armbruster; Lisa Banta; Jackie Barnes; Jessie Lorenz; Asya Miller; Robin Theryoung; Coach: Ken Armbruster	Denmark; W 2-0	2 Q	Denmark; W 4-3	China; W 6-5	Gold medal
Jen Armbruster; Lisa Banta; Jackie Barnes; Jessie Lorenz; Asya Miller; Robin Theryoung; Coach: Ken Armbruster	China; L 0-4	2 Q	Denmark; W 4-3	China; W 6-5	Gold medal
Jen Armbruster; Lisa Banta; Jackie Barnes; Jessie Lorenz; Asya Miller; Robin Theryoung; Coach: Ken Armbruster	Brazil; D 2-2	2 Q	Denmark; W 4-3	China; W 6-5	Gold medal
Jen Armbruster; Lisa Banta; Jackie Barnes; Jessie Lorenz; Asya Miller; Robin Theryoung; Coach: Ken Armbruster	Germany; W 4-0	2 Q	Denmark; W 4-3	China; W 6-5	Gold medal
Jen Armbruster; Lisa Banta; Jackie Barnes; Jessie Lorenz; Asya Miller; Robin Theryoung; Coach: Ken Armbruster	Canada; D 1-1	2 Q	Denmark; W 4-3	China; W 6-5	Gold medal
Jen Armbruster; Lisa Banta; Jackie Barnes; Jessie Lorenz; Asya Miller; Robin Theryoung; Coach: Ken Armbruster	Sweden; W 7-4	2 Q	Denmark; W 4-3	China; W 6-5	Gold medal

== Judo ==
Jordan Mouton was selected as the only U.S. representative in the women's division at the 2008 U.S. Paralympic Trials for Judo. All four American men went uncontested at the Trials and were automatically selected for the team. Greg DeWall, a first-time Paralympian, won a bronze medal in the Men's +100 kilogram class.

Athlete	Event	Round of 16	Quarterfinals	Semifinals	First Repechage Round	Repechage Semifinals	Final	
Athlete	Event	Opposition Result	Opposition Result	Opposition Result	Opposition Result	Opposition Result	Opposition Result	Rank
Greg DeWall	Men's +100 kg	Jimenez (CUB); W 1000–0000	Wang (CHN); L 0000–0111	Moved to repechage	Bye	Parasyuk (RUS); W 1000–0000	Park (KOR); W 1001–0110	Bronze medal
Scott Jones	Men's -81 kg	Oga (JPN); L 0001–0210	did not advance					
Jordan Mouton	Women's -70 kg	N/A	Herrera (ESP); L 0000–1000	Moved to repechage	N/A	Szabo (HUN); L 0000–1000	Did not advance	7
Myles Porter	Men's -100 kg	Bye	Silva (BRA); L 0000–1001	Moved to repechage	Nadri (IRI); W 1000–0000	Morgan (CAN); W 0200–0000	Cortada (CUB); L 0000–1000	5
Andre Watson	Men's -90 kg	Bye	Nine (ALG); L 0000–0001	Moved to repechage	Shevchenko (UKR); L 0000–1000	did not advance		

== Powerlifting ==
The U.S. powerlifting team consisted of two competitors, Mary Stack and Andy Wise. All of Stack's lifts were declared invalid. She faltered and missed on her first two attempts to lift 110 kg. On her third attempt, Stack managed to lift the weight but the judges did not accept the lift and she was disqualified. Wise completed two valid lifts, the maximum of which was 150 kg, and finished in eleventh place.

Athlete	Event	Attempts				Result	Rank
Athlete	Event	First	Second	Third	Fourth	Result	Rank
Mary Stack	Women's 82.5 kg	~~110.0~~	~~110.0~~	~~110.0~~	N/A	NMR	--
Andy Wise	Men's 67.5 kg	142.5	150.0	~~155.0~~	N/A	150.0	11

Key: NMR=No marks recorded

== Rowing ==
The 2008 U.S. Paralympic Rowing Team was selected after the 2008 U.S. Rowing National Championships in West Windsor, N.J. and was composed of nine athletes. This was the first time rowing has appeared as a medal sport in the Paralympic Games. Laura Schwanger, who has multiple sclerosis and won ten medals in track and field across three Paralympics, battled back from breast cancer treatment to win a bronze medal in women's single sculls at age 49. The U.S. mixed coxed four team rallied in the final 100 m of their 1000 m race to take the silver medal.

Athlete(s)	Event	Heats		Repechage		Final	
Athlete(s)	Event	Time	Rank	Time	Rank	Time	Rank
Ronald Harvey	Men's single sculls	5:47.55	4 R	5:50.51	2 FA	5:46.32	5
Laura Schwanger	Women's single sculls	6:01.78	1 FA	N/A		6:35.07	Bronze medal
William Brown; Angela Madsen	Mixed double sculls	4:29.69	4 R	4:42.64	3 FB	4:40.33	1
Simona Chin; Jamie Dean; Jesse Karmazin; Emma Preuschl; Tracy Tackett	Mixed coxed four	3:37.57	3 R	3:47.28	1 FA	3:37.61	Silver medal

Qualification Legend: R=Repechage; FA=Final A (medal); FB=Final B (non-medal)

== Sailing ==
The United States entered crews in all three of the sailing events, held in the Qingdao International Sailing Centre. Maureen McKinnon-Tucker and Nick Scandone clinched a gold medal in the SKUD-18 class with two races left in the series. First-time Paralympian John Ruf won a bronze medal in a competitive 2.4 mR final race, where the top seven players of the fleet started within single-digit points of each other.

Athlete	Event	Race											Total points	Net points Total-(#)	Rank
Athlete	Event	1	2	3	4	5	6	7	8	9	10	11	Total points	Net points Total-(#)	Rank
John Ruf	2.4 mR – 1 person keelboat	2	6	1	(9)	1	7	(10)	3	4	4	CAN	47	28	Bronze medal
Maureen McKinnon-Tucker; Nick Scandone	SKUD18 – 2 person keelboat	2	1	1	1	(3)	2	1	1	2	(12); DNS	CAN	26	11	Gold medal
Tim Angle; Rick Doerr; Bill Donohue	Sonar – 3 person keelboat	1	9	10	6	(11)	10	2	3	4	(15); RAF	2	73	47	8

Key

- (#) = Worst two results discarded
- CAN = Race cancelled
- DNS = Did not start
- RAF = Retired after finishing

== Shooting ==
The U.S. sent two athletes (one man and one woman) to compete in the shooting events at the Paralympics.

Athlete	Event	Qualification		Final	
Athlete	Event	Score	Rank	Score	Rank
Michael Dickey	Men's R7-50 m free rifle 3x40 SH1	1098	21	Did not advance	
Michael Dickey	Mixed R3-10 m air rifle prone SH1	595	41	Did not advance	
Danielle Fong	Women's R2-10 m air rifle standing SH1	385	19	Did not advance	
Danielle Fong	Women's R8-50 m sport rifle 3x20 SH1	562	16	Did not advance	

== Swimming ==
The 2008 U.S. Paralympic Swimming Trials were held on April 3–5 at the University of Minnesota in Minneapolis, Minnesota. A total of 38 swimming athletes (20 male and 18 female) were selected to represent the U.S. at the 2008 Paralympic Games. Melissa Stockwell, a former United States Army officer who lost her left leg to a roadside bomb, became the first Iraq War veteran to be selected for the Paralympics. The roster also included Dave Denniston, an NCAA champion in the 200-yard breast stroke, two-time Olympic hopeful, and world record breaker who was paralyzed in a 2005 sledding accident.

The U.S. Paralympic Swimming Team left Beijing with 17 gold, 14 silver and 13 bronze medals. The total of 44 medals was 9 more than they took home from Athens. Out of the 38 athletes on the team, 19 received a medal. U.S. swimmers set a total of 16 world records, 23 Paralympic records, 48 Pan American records and 99 American records.

Men

Event	Athletes	Heat		Final	
Event	Athletes	Time	Position	Time	Position
50 m freestyle – S2	Curtis Lovejoy	1:14.22	5 Q	1:12.59	6
50 m freestyle – S3	Michael DeMarco	1:00.69	8 Q	1:01.69	7
50 m freestyle – S4	Joe McCarthy	40.85	4 Q	39.95	5
50 m freestyle – S5	Roy Perkins	34.67	2 Q	34.61	4
50 m freestyle – S7	Lantz Lamback	29.95	3 Q	28.81	Bronze medal
50 m freestyle – S9	Mark Barr	27.89	18	Did not advance	
50 m freestyle – S9	Cody Bureau	27.11	11	Did not advance	
50 m freestyle – S9	Michael Prout	28.12	19	Did not advance	
50 m freestyle – S10	Justin Zook	24.92	4 Q	24.81	4
50 m freestyle – S11	Philip Scholz	29.23	13	Did not advance	
50 m freestyle – S12	Tucker Dupree	25.41	5 Q	25.31	6
100 m freestyle – S2	Curtis Lovejoy	2:35.49	5 Q	2:34.11	6
100 m freestyle – S3	Michael DeMarco	2:14.97	8 Q	2:07.72	7
100 m freestyle – S4	Joe McCarthy	1:40.19	8 Q	1:34.37	7
100 m freestyle – S5	Roy Perkins	1:17.86	3 Q	1:15.31	Bronze medal
100 m freestyle – S7	Lantz Lamback	1:03.70	2 Q	1:02.40	Silver medal
100 m freestyle – S9	Mark Barr	59.56	16	Did not advance	
100 m freestyle – S9	Cody Bureau	58.29	7 Q	58.14	7
100 m freestyle – S9	Michael Prout	59.18	14	Did not advance	
100 m freestyle – S10	Justin Zook	55.35	6 Q	55.68	8
100 m freestyle – S11	Philip Scholz	1:04.11	9	Did not advance	
100 m freestyle – S12	Tucker Dupree	55.16	4 Q	56.16	7
200 m freestyle – S2	Curtis Lovejoy	5:43.52	9	Did not advance	
200 m freestyle – S3	Michael DeMarco	N/A		4:39.79	6
200 m freestyle – S5	Roy Perkins	N/A		2:46.68	4
400 m freestyle – S7	Alex Dionne	5:14.97	5 Q	5:02.62	4
400 m freestyle – S7	Lantz Lamback	5:05.65	2 Q	4:56.46	Silver medal
400 m freestyle – S8	Rudy Garcia-Tolson	5:02.17	8 Q	Withdrew	
400 m freestyle – S8	Tom Miazga	5:14.26	9*	5:09.50	8
400 m freestyle – S9	Mark Barr	4:30.48	9	Did not advance	
400 m freestyle – S9	Jarrett Perry	4:38.55	12	Did not advance	
400 m freestyle – S9	Michael Prout	4:28.25	6 Q	4:29.44	7
400 m freestyle – S10	Joe Wise	4:18.37	2 Q	4:15.83	5
400 m freestyle – S11	Philip Scholz	5:02.07	5 Q	4:57.21	5
400 m freestyle – S12	Tucker Dupree	4:24.95	2 Q	4:23.98	4
50 m butterfly – S5	Roy Perkins	37.14 PR	1 Q	35.95 WR	Gold medal
50 m butterfly – S7	Lantz Lamback	33.83	7 Q	34.56	8
100 m butterfly – S8	Rudy Garcia-Tolson	1:12.99	12	Did not advance	
100 m butterfly – S9	Mark Barr	1:03.94	8 Q	1:03.91	8
100 m butterfly – S9	Cody Bureau	1:02.42	5 Q	1:02.21	6
100 m butterfly – S9	Michael Prout	1:05.81	12	Did not advance	
100 m butterfly – S10	Justin Zook	1:01.73	=10	Did not advance	
100 m butterfly – S11	Philip Scholz	1:11.93	8 Q	1:11.76	8
100 m butterfly – S12	Tucker Dupree	1:02.14	4 Q	1:01.53	5
50 m breaststroke – SB3	Michael DeMarco	1:03.26	9	Did not advance	
100 m breaststroke – SB4	Dave Denniston	1:53.23	9	Did not advance	
100 m breaststroke – SB4	Roy Perkins	1:56.02	10	Did not advance	
100 m breaststroke – SB5	Aaron Paulson	1:44.68	8 Q	1:42.43	7
100 m breaststroke – SB7	Rudy Garcia-Tolson	1:25.76	4 Q	1:24.01	Bronze medal
100 m breaststroke – SB8	Jarrett Perry	1:19.44	8 Q	1:20.64	8
100 m breaststroke – SB9	Kendall Bailey	1:20.82	12	Did not advance	
100 m breaststroke – SB9	Cody Bureau	DSQ		Did not advance	
50 m backstroke – S1	Grover Evans	N/A		2:51.17	6
50 m backstroke – S2	Curtis Lovejoy	1:16.03	8 Q	1:14.69	6
50 m backstroke – S3	Michael DeMarco	1:03.21	8 Q	1:03.03	8
50 m backstroke – S4	Joe McCarthy	55.70	10	Did not advance	
50 m backstroke – S5	Dave Denniston	53.07	14	Did not advance	
50 m backstroke – S5	Roy Perkins	50.77	13	Did not advance	
100 m backstroke – S7	Lantz Lamback	1:14.06 WR	1 Q	1:12.09 WR	Gold medal
100 m backstroke – S8	Tom Miazga	1:16.01	9	Did not advance	
100 m backstroke – S9	Cody Bureau	1:06.42	4 Q	1:05.47	5
100 m backstroke – S9	Jarrett Perry	1:03.47 WR	1 Q	1:03.66	Bronze medal
100 m backstroke – S9	Michael Prout	1:08.72	6 Q	1:08.09	8
100 m backstroke – S10	Justin Zook	1:01.15 WR	1 Q	1:01.29	Gold medal
100 m backstroke – S11	Justin Zook	1:20.46	13	Did not advance	
100 m backstroke – S12	Tucker Dupree	1:04.14	4 Q	1:04.08	5
200 m individual medley – SM5	Roy Perkins	3:30.69	5 Q	3:23.63	5
200 m individual medley – SM7	Rudy Garcia-Tolson	2:37.80 WR	1 Q	2:35.92 WR	Gold medal
200 m individual medley – SM9	Cody Bureau	2:27.30	8 Q	2:20.21	Bronze medal
200 m individual medley – SM9	Jarrett Perry	DSQ		Did not advance	
200 m individual medley – SM9	Michael Prout	2:25.65	5 Q	2:25.56	6
200 m individual medley – SM12	Tucker Dupree	2:20.32	6 Q	2:19.12	6
4x50 m freestyle relay – 20pts	Michael DeMarco; Dave Denniston; Lantz Lamback; Roy Perkins	N/A		DSQ (Lamback S7, Denniston S5, DeMarco S3, Perkins S5)	
4x100 m freestyle relay – 34pts	Mark Barr; Cody Bureau; Lantz Lamback; Michael Prout	N/A		3:59.97 (Prout S9, Barr S9, Lamback S7, Bureau S9)	6
4x50 m medley relay – 20pts	Dave Denniston; Lantz Lamback; Joe McCarthy; Roy Perkins	2:46.20 (Lamback S7, Denniston SB4, Perkins S5, McCarthy S4)	1 Q	2:43.00 (Lamback S7, Denniston SB4, Perkins S5, McCarthy S4)	4
4x100 m medley relay – 34pts	Mark Barr; Cody Bureau; Rudy Garcia-Tolson; Lantz Lamback; Jarrett Perry; Michael Prout; Justin Zook	4:32.41 (Perry S9, Garcia-Tolson SB7, Barr S9, Prout S9)	2 Q	4:29.38 (Zook S10, Perry SB8, Bureau S9, Lamback S7)	7

*Listed as finishing heats in ninth place, but started the final in place of eighth-place qualifier Rudy Garcia-Tolson
Legend: Q – Qualifiers for the next round as decided on a time only basis. Ranks shown are overall rank against competitors in all heats; WR=World Record; PR=Paralympic Record

Women

Event	Athletes	Heat		Final	
Event	Athletes	Time	Position	Time	Position
50 m freestyle – S3	Beth Kolbe	1:11.69	6 Q	1:10.55	5
50 m freestyle – S4	Cheryl Angelelli-Kornoelje	N/A		52.81	Silver medal
50 m freestyle – S4	Aimee Bruder	N/A		55.04	5
50 m freestyle – S5	Marin Morrison	1:35.60	14	Did not advance	
50 m freestyle – S6	Casey Johnson	41.95	10	Did not advance	
50 m freestyle – S6	Miranda Uhl	39.20	7 Q	39.14	7
50 m freestyle – S7	Cortney Jordan	35.57	4 Q	33.84 PR	Gold medal
50 m freestyle – S7	Erin Popovich	34.22 PR	1 Q	33.92	Silver medal
50 m freestyle – S8	Amanda Everlove	32.96	7 Q	32.20	Silver medal
50 m freestyle – S8	Jessica Long	32.54	5 Q	32.58	6
50 m freestyle – S9	April Kerley	30.76	6 Q	30.20	5
50 m freestyle – S9	Elizabeth Stone	31.24	10	Did not advance	
50 m freestyle – S10	Anna Eames	29.78	5 Q	29.17	4
50 m freestyle – S10	Ashley Owens	30.29	9	Did not advance	
50 m freestyle – S10	Susan Beth Scott	29.67	4 Q	29.38	5
50 m freestyle – S13	Kelley Becherer	N/A		27.85	Gold medal
100 m freestyle – S4	Cheryl Angelelli-Kornoelje	1:50.51	2 Q	1:50.25	Silver medal
100 m freestyle – S4	Aimee Bruder	1:56.69	3 Q	1:55.33	Bronze medal
100 m freestyle – S5	Marin Morrison	3:10.30	12	Did not advance	
100 m freestyle – S6	Casey Johnson	1:27.75	8 Q	1:26.42	8
100 m freestyle – S6	Miranda Uhl	1:23.73	6 Q	1:22.22	7
100 m freestyle – S7	Cortney Jordan	N/A		1:12.09	Silver medal
100 m freestyle – S7	Erin Popovich	N/A		1:11.82 PR	Gold medal
100 m freestyle – S8	Amanda Everlove	1:10.84	4 Q	1:10.65	4
100 m freestyle – S8	Jessica Long	1:06.81 WR	1 Q	1:06.91	Gold medal
100 m freestyle – S9	April Kerley	1:06.30	9	Did not advance	
100 m freestyle – S9	Melissa Stockwell	1:09.55	17	Did not advance	
100 m freestyle – S9	Elizabeth Stone	1:05.06	4 Q	1:04.86	6
100 m freestyle – S10	Anna Eames	1:03.58	3 Q	1:01.91	Bronze medal
100 m freestyle – S10	Ashley Owens	1:03.59	4 Q	1:01.57 WR	Gold medal
100 m freestyle – S10	Susan Beth Scott	1:02.93	2 Q	1:02.33	4
100 m freestyle – S13	Kelley Becherer	1:00.27	1 Q	1:00.46	Bronze medal
200 m freestyle – S5	Cheryl Angelelli-Kornoelje	3:44.56	12	Did not advance	
200 m freestyle – S5	Aimee Bruder	3:57.63	15	Did not advance	
400 m freestyle – S6	Casey Johnson	6:49.80	10	Did not advance	
400 m freestyle – S6	Miranda Uhl	6:00.34	3 Q	5:55.64	4
400 m freestyle – S7	Deborah Gruen	6:05.90	10	Did not advance	
400 m freestyle – S7	Cortney Jordan	5:31.27	1 Q	5:21.01	Silver medal
400 m freestyle – S7	Erin Popovich	5:34.18	2 Q	5:17.41 PR	Gold medal
400 m freestyle – S8	Jessica Long	4:47.45 WR	1 Q	4:50.17	Gold medal
400 m freestyle – S9	Melissa Stockwell	5:09.89	10	Did not advance	
400 m freestyle – S9	Elizabeth Stone	5:01.24	6 Q	4:46.53	4
400 m freestyle – S10	Anna Eames	4:52.77	7 Q	4:43.98	4
400 m freestyle – S10	Ashley Owens	4:50.68	4 Q	4:38.11	Silver medal
400 m freestyle – S10	Susan Beth Scott	4:46.16	1 Q	4:39.44	Bronze medal
400 m freestyle – S13	Kelley Becherer	4:42.18	2 Q	4:37.50	=
50 m butterfly – S6	Casey Johnson	43.99	8 Q	42.35	6
50 m butterfly – S6	Miranda Uhl	43.98	7 Q	42.50	7
50 m butterfly – S7	Deborah Gruen	49.19	13	Did not advance	
50 m butterfly – S7	Cortney Jordan	44.94	10	Did not advance	
50 m butterfly – S7	Erin Popovich	38.71	2 Q	37.87	Silver medal
100 m butterfly – S8	Amanda Everlove	1:11.64 WR	1 Q	1:12.16	Silver medal
100 m butterfly – S8	Jessica Long	1:12.54	2 Q	1:11.96	Gold medal
100 m butterfly – S9	April Kerley	1:17.15	14	Did not advance	
100 m butterfly – S9	Melissa Stockwell	1:22.09	18	Did not advance	
100 m butterfly – S9	Elizabeth Stone	1:14.99	10	Did not advance	
100 m butterfly – S10	Anna Eames	1:09.26	1 Q	1:09.44	Gold medal
100 m butterfly – S10	Susan Beth Scott	1:15.11	6 Q	1:15.72	6
100 m butterfly – S13	Kelley Becherer	1:08.91	5 Q	1:08.38	6
100 m breaststroke – SB6	Deborah Gruen	1:46.76	4 Q	1:44.00	Bronze medal
100 m breaststroke – SB6	Casey Johnson	2:07.89	11	Did not advance	
100 m breaststroke – SB6	Miranda Uhl	1:50.80	5 Q	1:48.44	6
100 m breaststroke – SB7	Jessica Long	N/A		1:38.60	Bronze medal
100 m breaststroke – SB7	Erin Popovich	N/A		1:31.60 WR	Gold medal
100 m backstroke – S3	Beth Kolbe	1:18.81	8 Q	1:17.97	8
100 m backstroke – S5	Marin Morrison	DSQ		Did not advance	
100 m backstroke – S6	Casey Johnson	1:51.42	13	Did not advance	
100 m backstroke – S6	Miranda Uhl	1:41.74	6 Q	1:40.44	8
100 m backstroke – S7	Cortney Jordan	1:30.14	5 Q	1:26.57	4
100 m backstroke – S8	Amanda Everlove	DSQ		Did not advance	
100 m backstroke – S8	Jessica Long	1:20.44	2 Q	1:19.56	Silver medal
100 m backstroke – S9	Elizabeth Stone	1:13.52	4 Q	1:11.16	Silver medal
100 m backstroke – S10	Susan Beth Scott	1:14.09	4 Q	1:13.97	4
100 m backstroke – S13	Kelley Becherer	1:13.06	3 Q	1:11.53	5
150 m individual medley – SM4	Aimee Bruder	N/A		3:29.80	4
200 m individual medley – SM6	Casey Johnson	3:56.80	12	Did not advance	
200 m individual medley – SM6	Miranda Uhl	3:16.95 PR	1 Q	3:13.05 WR	Gold medal
200 m individual medley – SM7	Deborah Gruen	3:29.16	7 Q	3:27.48	7
200 m individual medley – SM7	Cortney Jordan	3:15.89	2 Q	3:07.96	Bronze medal
200 m individual medley – SM7	Erin Popovich	3:01.21 PR	1 Q	2:54.61 WR	Gold medal
200 m individual medley – SM8	Amanda Everlove	2:52.93	2 Q	2:50.51	Silver medal
200 m individual medley – SM8	Jessica Long	2:42.56 WR	1 Q	2:41.85 WR	Gold medal
200 m individual medley – SM10	Anna Eames	2:43.21	4 Q	2:42.46	5
200 m individual medley – SM10	Susan Beth Scott	2:45.39	6 Q	2:43.99	6
200 m individual medley – SM13	Kelley Becherer	N/A		2:32.21	4

Legend: Q – Qualifiers for the next round as decided on a time only basis. Ranks shown are overall rank against competitors in all heats; WR=World Record; PR=Paralympic Record

== Table tennis ==
The United States sent four athletes (three men and one woman) to compete in Paralympic table tennis.

Men

Athlete	Event	Group matches		Round of 16	Quarterfinals	Semifinals	Final Bronze final	
Athlete	Event	Opposition Result	Rank	Opposition Result	Opposition Result	Opposition Result	Opposition Result	Rank
Tahl Leibovitz	Singles C9-10	Heijnen (NED); W 3–0 Miettinen (FIN); L 1–3	2	N/A		Did not advance		
Andre Scott	Singles C4-5	Kober (GER); W 3–1 Robertson (GBR); L 0–3	3	N/A		Did not advance		
Mitch Seidenfeld	Singles C7	Jurasz (POL); L 1–3 Messi (FRA); W 3–0 du Plooy (RSA); W 3–0	1	N/A		Ye (CHN); L 0–3	Valera (ESP); L 1–3	4
Tahl Leibovitz; Andre Scott; Mitch Seidenfeld	Team C9-10	N/A		Ukraine (UKR); L 2–3	Did not advance			

Women

Athlete	Event	Group matches		Round of 16	Quarterfinals	Semifinals	Final Bronze final	
Athlete	Event	Opposition Result	Rank	Opposition Result	Opposition Result	Opposition Result	Opposition Result	Rank
Noga Nir-Kistler	Singles C5	Bessho (JPN); L 1–3 Nardelli (ITA); L 1–3; Abuawad (JOR); L 0–3	4	N/A		Did not advance		

== Volleyball ==
The U.S. women's sitting volleyball team upset world number one Netherlands in five sets to reach the gold medal match, where they lost to China for a silver medal. The men's sitting volleyball team failed to qualify for the Paralympics after losing to Brazil at the 2007 Parapan American Games.

Women's sitting volleyball

Squad list	Preliminaries		Semifinal	Final	Rank
Squad list	Pool B	Rank	Semifinal	Final	Rank
Allison Aldrich; Heather Erickson; Alexandra Gouldie; Katryn Holloway; SuGui Kriss; Kendra Lancaster; Hope Lewellen; Brenda Maymon (captain); Gina McWilliams; Nichole Millage; Kari Miller (libero); Lora Webster Coach: Michael Hulett	Lithuania; W 3–0 (25–15,25–18,25–9)	2 Q	Netherlands; W 3–2 (19–25,25–23,28–26, 25–27, 15–10)	China; L 0–3 (14–25,19–25,15–25)	Silver medal
Allison Aldrich; Heather Erickson; Alexandra Gouldie; Katryn Holloway; SuGui Kriss; Kendra Lancaster; Hope Lewellen; Brenda Maymon (captain); Gina McWilliams; Nichole Millage; Kari Miller (libero); Lora Webster Coach: Michael Hulett	China; L 0–3 (14–25,21–25,19–25)	2 Q	Netherlands; W 3–2 (19–25,25–23,28–26, 25–27, 15–10)	China; L 0–3 (14–25,19–25,15–25)	Silver medal
Allison Aldrich; Heather Erickson; Alexandra Gouldie; Katryn Holloway; SuGui Kriss; Kendra Lancaster; Hope Lewellen; Brenda Maymon (captain); Gina McWilliams; Nichole Millage; Kari Miller (libero); Lora Webster Coach: Michael Hulett	Latvia; W 3–0 (25–12,25–17,25–11)	2 Q	Netherlands; W 3–2 (19–25,25–23,28–26, 25–27, 15–10)	China; L 0–3 (14–25,19–25,15–25)	Silver medal

== Wheelchair basketball ==
The United States qualified for both men's and women's wheelchair basketball tournaments at the International Wheelchair Basketball Federation qualifying tournaments for the Americas. The men's team finished in fourth place after losing to Great Britain in the bronze final. The women's team successfully defended their 2004 gold medal with a win over Germany.

Men

Squad list	Group stage (Pool B)		Quarterfinal	Semifinal	Final (Bronze final)	
Squad list	Opposition Result	Rank	Opposition Result	Opposition Result	Opposition Result	Rank
From: Eric Barber; Joe Chambers; Jacob Counts; Jeremy Lade; Matt Lesperance; Jaime Mazzi; Jay Nelms; Mikey Paye; Paul Schulte; Matt Scott; Steve Serio; Jeff Glasbrenner; Coach: Steve Wilson	Israel; W 76–53	2 Q	Iran; W 20–0*	Canada; L 62–69	Great Britain; L 77–85	4
From: Eric Barber; Joe Chambers; Jacob Counts; Jeremy Lade; Matt Lesperance; Jaime Mazzi; Jay Nelms; Mikey Paye; Paul Schulte; Matt Scott; Steve Serio; Jeff Glasbrenner; Coach: Steve Wilson	Brazil; W 87–41	2 Q	Iran; W 20–0*	Canada; L 62–69	Great Britain; L 77–85	4
From: Eric Barber; Joe Chambers; Jacob Counts; Jeremy Lade; Matt Lesperance; Jaime Mazzi; Jay Nelms; Mikey Paye; Paul Schulte; Matt Scott; Steve Serio; Jeff Glasbrenner; Coach: Steve Wilson	Great Britain; L 50–54	2 Q	Iran; W 20–0*	Canada; L 62–69	Great Britain; L 77–85	4
From: Eric Barber; Joe Chambers; Jacob Counts; Jeremy Lade; Matt Lesperance; Jaime Mazzi; Jay Nelms; Mikey Paye; Paul Schulte; Matt Scott; Steve Serio; Jeff Glasbrenner; Coach: Steve Wilson	China; W 97–38	2 Q	Iran; W 20–0*	Canada; L 62–69	Great Britain; L 77–85	4
From: Eric Barber; Joe Chambers; Jacob Counts; Jeremy Lade; Matt Lesperance; Jaime Mazzi; Jay Nelms; Mikey Paye; Paul Schulte; Matt Scott; Steve Serio; Jeff Glasbrenner; Coach: Steve Wilson	Australia; W 68–61	2 Q	Iran; W 20–0*	Canada; L 62–69	Great Britain; L 77–85	4

*Iran withdrew from its quarterfinal match against the United States on September 19, 2008. The match had been rescheduled from 11:15am to 9:00am, but was changed without any logical reason according to the head of Iran's delegation. As a result, the U.S. was awarded the win by the score of 20–0 and automatically advanced to the semi-finals.

Women

Squad list	Group stage (Pool A)		Quarterfinal	Semifinal	Final	
Squad list	Opposition Result	Rank	Opposition Result	Opposition Result	Opposition Result	Rank
From: Sarah Castle; Patty Cisneros (captain); Loraine Gonzales; Carlee Hoffman; Emily Hoskins; Mary Allison Milford; Rebecca Murray; Alana Nichols; Christina Ripp; Jen Ruddell; Natalie Schneider; Stephanie Wheeler; Coach: Ronald Lykins	Germany; W 42–38	1 Q	China; W 75–31	Australia; W 60–47	Germany; W 50–38	Gold medal
From: Sarah Castle; Patty Cisneros (captain); Loraine Gonzales; Carlee Hoffman; Emily Hoskins; Mary Allison Milford; Rebecca Murray; Alana Nichols; Christina Ripp; Jen Ruddell; Natalie Schneider; Stephanie Wheeler; Coach: Ronald Lykins	Australia; W 61–42	1 Q	China; W 75–31	Australia; W 60–47	Germany; W 50–38	Gold medal
From: Sarah Castle; Patty Cisneros (captain); Loraine Gonzales; Carlee Hoffman; Emily Hoskins; Mary Allison Milford; Rebecca Murray; Alana Nichols; Christina Ripp; Jen Ruddell; Natalie Schneider; Stephanie Wheeler; Coach: Ronald Lykins	Great Britain; W 56–31	1 Q	China; W 75–31	Australia; W 60–47	Germany; W 50–38	Gold medal
From: Sarah Castle; Patty Cisneros (captain); Loraine Gonzales; Carlee Hoffman; Emily Hoskins; Mary Allison Milford; Rebecca Murray; Alana Nichols; Christina Ripp; Jen Ruddell; Natalie Schneider; Stephanie Wheeler; Coach: Ronald Lykins	Brazil; W 68–38	1 Q	China; W 75–31	Australia; W 60–47	Germany; W 50–38	Gold medal

== Wheelchair fencing ==
The United States sent five athletes (four men and one woman) to compete in wheelchair fencing.

Athlete	Event	Pool play		Round of 16	Quarterfinals	Semifinals	Final	
Athlete	Event	W–L	Rank	Opposition Result	Opposition Result	Opposition Result	Opposition Result	Rank
Mark Calhoun	Men's foil A	1–4	6	did not advance				
Mark Calhoun	Men's saber A	3–3	4	Pylarinos Markantonatos (GRE); L 8–15	did not advance			
Andrea Demello	Women's épée B	1–4	6	did not advance				
Andrea Demello	Women's foil B	0–5	6	did not advance				
Gerard Moreno	Men's foil B	1–4	5	did not advance				
Gerard Moreno	Men's saber B	0–5	6	did not advance				
Scott Rodgers	Men's épée B	4–1	3	Williams (USA); W 15–2	Bezyazychny (BLR); L 4–15	did not advance		
Scott Rodgers	Men's foil B	2–3	4	Czop (POL); W 15–11	Hu (CHN); L 10–15	did not advance		
Benjy Williams	Men's épée B	2–3	4	Rodgers (USA); L 2–15	did not advance			
Benjy Williams	Men's saber B	0–5	6	did not advance				

== Wheelchair rugby ==
At the Paralympics teams in the sport of wheelchair rugby are made up of mixed classification quadriplegic athletes of both sexes. The United States qualified by winning the 2006 World Wheelchair Rugby Championships and went on to win its third gold medal since wheelchair rugby was introduced as a demonstration sport at the 1996 Atlanta Paralympics.

Squad list	Group stage (Pool A)		Semifinal	Final	
Squad list	Opposition Result	Rank	Opposition Result	Opposition Result	Rank
From: Andy Cohn; Will Groulx; Scott Hogsett; Bryan Kirkland; Norm Lyduch; Seth McBride; Jason Regier; Nick Springer; Chance Sumner; Joel Wilmoth; Mark Zupan; Coach: James Gumbert	China; W 65–30	1 Q	Great Britain; W 35–32	Australia; W 53–44	Gold medal
From: Andy Cohn; Will Groulx; Scott Hogsett; Bryan Kirkland; Norm Lyduch; Seth McBride; Jason Regier; Nick Springer; Chance Sumner; Joel Wilmoth; Mark Zupan; Coach: James Gumbert	Japan; W 44–37	1 Q	Great Britain; W 35–32	Australia; W 53–44	Gold medal
From: Andy Cohn; Will Groulx; Scott Hogsett; Bryan Kirkland; Norm Lyduch; Seth McBride; Jason Regier; Nick Springer; Chance Sumner; Joel Wilmoth; Mark Zupan; Coach: James Gumbert	Canada; W 37–32	1 Q	Great Britain; W 35–32	Australia; W 53–44	Gold medal

== Wheelchair tennis ==
The American wheelchair tennis team consisted of nine players. Lee Hinson, Paul Moran, Jon Rydberg and Stephen Welch competed in the men's events, Beth Arnoult and Kaitlyn Verfuerth competed in the women's events, and Brent Poppen, Nick Taylor and David Wagner competed in the mixed quadriplegic events. The tennis team was coached by Dan James, with Jason Hartnett as assistant coach, David Schobel as team leader, and Bill Taylor as the personal care assistant. Taylor and Wagner successfully defended their title in mixed doubles, which they had won four years earlier at the 2004 Paralympics. The two men competed against each other in the bronze medal match of the mixed singles event, with Wagner prevailing.

Athlete	Event	Round of 64	Round of 32	Round of 16	Quarterfinals	Semifinals	Final	
Athlete	Event	Opposition Result	Opposition Result	Opposition Result	Opposition Result	Opposition Result	Opposition Result	Rank
Lee Hinson	Men's singles	Pommê (BRA); W 6–1, 6–3	Gérard (BEL); L 2–6, 0–6	did not advance				
Paul Moran	Men's singles	Vink (NED); L 0–6, 1–6	did not advance					
Jon Rydberg	Men's singles	Pfundner (AUT); W 6–2, 6–0	Felix (SVK); W 6–4, 6–3	Kunieda (JPN); L 1–6, 1–6	did not advance			
Stephen Welch	Men's singles	Cayulef (CHI); W 6–1, 6–1	Majdi (FRA); W 6–1, 6–0	Ammerlaan (NED); L 2–6, 3–6	did not advance			
Beth Arnoult	Women's singles	N/A	Ida (INA); W 6–0, 6–0	Sevenans (BEL); W 1–6, 6–3, 6–4	Griffioen (NED); L 3–6, 0–6	did not advance		
Kaitlyn Verfuerth	Women's singles	N/A	Montjane (RSA); W 6–4, 6–0	Walraven (NED); L 1–6, 5–7	did not advance			
Brent Poppen	Mixed singles	N/A		Andersson (SWE); L 2–6, 6–7	did not advance			
Nick Taylor	Mixed singles	N/A		Kramer (ISR); W 6–3, 6–3	Van Erp (NED); W 1–6, 7–5, 7–6	Norfolk (GBR); L 0–6, 3–6	Wagner (USA); L 2–6, 6–4, 1–6	4
David Wagner	Mixed singles	N/A		Hunter (CAN); W 6–3, 4–6, 6–4	Weinberg (ISR); W 6–2, 6–2	Andersson (SWE); L 4–6, 6–2, 3–6	Taylor (USA); W 6–2, 4–6, 6–1	Bronze medal
Lee Hinson; Paul Moran	Men's doubles	N/A	Carter/ Mathieu (CAN); W 7–6, 3–6, 6–4	Olsson/ Wikstrom (SWE); L 1–6, 4–6	did not advance			
Jon Rydberg; Stephen Welch	Men's doubles	N/A	Li/ Shi (CHN); W 6–4, 6–7, 6–1	Scheffers/ Vink (NED); L 3–6, 1–6	did not advance			
Beth Arnoult; Kaitlyn Verfuerth	Women's doubles	N/A		Bye	Shuker/ Whiley (GBR); W 5–7, 7–5, 6–2	Griffioen/ Vergeer (NED); L 2–6, 1–6	Gravellier/ Racineux (FRA); L 7–5, 3–6, 2–6	4
Nick Taylor; David Wagner	Mixed doubles	N/A			Bye	Timmermans-van Hall/ Van Erp (NED); W 6–3, 6–4	Kramer/ Weinberg (ISR); W 6–0, 4–6, 6–2	Gold medal

== Media coverage ==
U.S. coverage of the 2008 Paralympic Games was provided by the Universal Sports Television Network. Daily live and delayed highlight shows as well as coverage of the opening and closing ceremonies was available on-demand at UniversalSports.com from September 6–17. Daily video highlights were also available at the official website of the U.S. Paralympic Team, usparalympics.org. The Universal Sports television broadcast began on October 8, followed by seven days of three-hour segments of coverage and a special presentation highlighting the events that was broadcast by NBC on October 18. A 90-minute documentary was presented by NBC on November 9, and was followed by another broadcast of the Games on Universal Sports from November 10–16.

== See also ==
- 2008 Summer Paralympics
- United States at the 2008 Summer Olympics
