= Athletics at the 2008 Summer Paralympics – Women's 200 metres T53 =

Women's 200m T53 at the XIII Paralympic Games
- Venue: Beijing National Stadium
- Dates: 15 September
- Competitors: 13 from 10 nations
- Winning time: 29.17

Medalists
1st place, gold medalist(s)		Huang Lisha	China
2nd place, silver medalist(s)		Jessica Galli	United States
3rd place, bronze medalist(s)		Zhou Hongzhuan	China

The women's 200m T53 event at the 2008 Summer Paralympics took place at the Beijing National Stadium on 15 September. There were two heats; the first 3 in each heat (Q) plus the 2 fastest other times (q) qualified.

== Results ==
=== Heats ===
Competed from 10:00.

==== Heat 1 ====
Rank	Name	Nationality	Time	Notes
1	Zhou Hongzhuan	China	30.52	Q
2	Anjali Forber Pratt	United States	31.66	Q
3	Francesca Porcellato	Italy	32.20	Q
4	Angie Ballard	Australia	32.36	q
5	Madelene Nordlund	Sweden	32.66	q
6	Maggie Redden	United States	35.13	

==== Heat 2 ====
Rank	Name	Nationality	Time	Notes
1	Huang Lisha	China	29.84	Q
2	Jessica Galli	United States	30.58	Q
3	Ilana Duff	Canada	32.03	Q
4	Evelyn Enciso	Mexico	33.32	
5	Yadira Soturno	Venezuela	35.03	
6	Patrice Dockery	Ireland	35.38	
7	Thi Thanh Thao Nguyen	Vietnam	36.92	

=== Final ===
Competed at 10:31.

Rank	Name	Nationality	Time	Notes
1st place, gold medalist(s)	Huang Lisha	China	29.17	WR
2nd place, silver medalist(s)	Jessica Galli	United States	29.68	
3rd place, bronze medalist(s)	Zhou Hongzhuan	China	30.15	
4	Anjali Forber Pratt	United States	30.99	
5	Ilana Duff	Canada	31.47	
6	Francesca Porcellato	Italy	31.61	
7	Angie Ballard	Australia	31.81	
8	Madelene Nordlund	Sweden	32.31	

Q = qualified for final by place. q = qualified by time. WR = World Record.
