= Athletics at the 2008 Summer Paralympics – Men's pentathlon P44 =

Men's Pentathlon P44 at the XIII Paralympic Games
- Venue: Beijing National Stadium
- Dates: 11 September
- Competitors: 5 from 3 nations
- Winning score: 4662

Medalists
1st place, gold medalist(s)		Jeremy Campbell	United States
2nd place, silver medalist(s)		Jeff Skiba	United States
3rd place, bronze medalist(s)		Urs Kolly	Switzerland

The men's pentathlon P44 event at the 2008 Summer Paralympics took place at the Beijing National Stadium on 11 September. The competition was won by Jeremy Campbell, representing United States.

== Results ==
=== Long Jump ===
Place	Athlete	1	2	3	Best	Points	Total
1	Casey Tibbs (USA)	6.76	x	x	6.76	995	995
2	Jeremy Campbell (USA)	x	6.16	6.40	6.40	942	942
3	Urs Kolly (SUI)	5.96	6.30	6.26	6.30	927	927
4	Jeff Skiba (USA)	5.80	x	6.15	6.15	905	905
	Roberto la Barberaita (ITA)	x	x	x	NM	0	0

Roberto la Barberaita did not participate in the remaining disciplines.

=== Shot Put ===
Place	Athlete	1	2	3	Best	Points	Total
1	Jeremy Campbell (USA)	14.44	12.71	13.17	14.44	917	1859
2	Jeff Skiba (USA)	12.63	12.35	x	12.63	802	1707
3	Urs Kolly (SUI)	11.25	11.72	12.25	12.25	778	1705
4	Casey Tibbs (USA)	11.60	12.08	11.98	12.08	767	1762

=== 100 metres ===
Place	Athlete	Time	Points	Total
1	Jeremy Campbell (USA)	11.56	956	2815
2	Casey Tibbs (USA)	11.62	951	2713
3	Jeff Skiba (USA)	12.12	906	2613
4	Urs Kolly (SUI)	12.60	862	2567

=== Discus Throw ===
Place	Athlete	1	2	3	Best	Points	Total
1	Jeremy Campbell (USA)	46.07	47.20	52.30	52.30	948	3763
2	Jeff Skiba (USA)	45.39	x	47.31	47.31	858	3471
3	Urs Kolly (SUI)	x	40.15	38.13	38.13	728	3295
4	Casey Tibbs (USA)	x	x	x	NM	0	2713

=== 400 metres ===
Casey Tibbs did not participate.

Place	Athlete	Time	Points	Total
1	Jeremy Campbell (USA)	56.39	899	4662
2	Urs Kolly (SUI)	1:00.29	823	4118
3	Jeff Skiba (USA)	1:01.29	803	4274

== Final classification ==
Place	Athlete	Long Jump	Shot Put	100m	Discus	400m	Total
1st place, gold medalist(s)	Jeremy Campbell (USA)	942	917	956	948	899	4662
2nd place, silver medalist(s)	Jeff Skiba (USA)	905	802	906	858	803	4274
3rd place, bronze medalist(s)	Urs Kolly (SUI)	927	778	862	728	823	4118
4	Casey Tibbs (USA)	995	767	951	0	-	2713
	Roberto la Barberaita (ITA)	0	-	-	-	-	0
