= Athletics at the 2008 Summer Paralympics – Men's long jump F42/44 =

Sports event

The Men's Long Jump F42/44 had its Final held on September 16 at 9:10.

== Medalists ==
Gold	Wojtek Czyz; Germany
Silver	Atsushi Yamamoto; Japan
Bronze	Casey Tibbs; United States

== Results ==
Place	Athlete	Class	1	2	3	4	5	6	Best	Points
1	Wojtek Czyz (GER)	F42	6.50	6.18	6.40	x	x	x	6.50 WR	1101
2	Atsushi Yamamoto (JPN)	F42	x	x	5.84	5.67	x	x	5.84	989
3	Casey Tibbs (USA)	F44	x	6.39	x	x	x	x	6.39	988
4	Jeremy Campbell (USA)	F44	6.00	6.25	x	6.30	x	6.36	6.36	983
5	Urs Kolly (SUI)	F44	6.36	6.26	x	6.16	6.17	6.17	6.36	983
6	Qiuhong Wang (CHN)	F44	5.99	x	6.24	6.31	6.08	x	6.31	975
7	Andre Luiz Oliveira (BRA)	F44	6.04	6.02	6.19	6.07	x	6.16	6.19	957
8	Roberto la Barbera (ITA)	F44	x	6.14	x	x	x	4.39	6.14	949
9	Jeff Skiba (USA)	F44	5.83	x	5.83				5.83	901
10	Stefano Lippi (ITA)	F42	x	5.26	5.32				5.32	901
11	Heros Marai (ITA)	F44	5.78	5.65	5.12				5.78	893
	Xavier le Draoullec (FRA)	F44	x	x	x				NM	
	Heinrich Popow (GER)	F42	x	x	x				NM	
	Wijesinghe Adikari (SRI)	F44							DNS	
