= Athletics at the 2008 Summer Paralympics – Women's 100 metres T53 =

Women's 100m T53 at the XIII Paralympic Games
- Venue: Beijing National Stadium
- Dates: 12 September
- Competitors: 12 from 10 nations
- Winning time: 16.22

Medalists
1st place, gold medalist(s)		Huang Lisha	China
2nd place, silver medalist(s)		Jessica Galli	United States
3rd place, bronze medalist(s)		Ilana Duff	Canada

The women's 100m T53 event at the 2008 Summer Paralympics took place at the Beijing National Stadium on 12 September. There were two heats; the first 3 in each heat (Q) plus the 2 fastest other times (q) qualified.

== Results ==
=== Heats ===
Competed from 11:20.

==== Heat 1 ====
Rank	Name	Nationality	Time	Notes
1	Huang Lisha	China	16.29	Q, PR
2	Jessica Galli	United States	17.00	Q
3	Francesca Porcellato	Italy	17.60	Q
4	Ilana Duff	Canada	17.74	q
5	Evelyn Enciso	Mexico	18.83	q
6	Yadira Soturno	Venezuela	18.88	

==== Heat 2 ====
Rank	Name	Nationality	Time	Notes
1	Anjali Forber Pratt	United States	17.46	Q
2	Angie Ballard	Australia	18.19	Q
3	Madelene Nordlund	Sweden	18.66	Q
4	Patrice Dockery	Ireland	18.90	
5	Maggie Redden	United States	19.29	
6	Thi Thanh Thao Nguyen	Vietnam	19.80	

=== Final ===
Competed at 19:11.

Rank	Name	Nationality	Time	Notes
1st place, gold medalist(s)	Huang Lisha	China	16.22	WR
2nd place, silver medalist(s)	Jessica Galli	United States	16.88	
3rd place, bronze medalist(s)	Ilana Duff	Canada	17.69	
4	Francesca Porcellato	Italy	17.86	
5	Angie Ballard	Australia	17.89	
6	Anjali Forber Pratt	United States	17.99	
7	Madelene Nordlund	Sweden	18.40	
8	Evelyn Enciso	Mexico	18.43	

Q = qualified for final by place. q = qualified by time. WR = World Record. PR = Paralympic Record.
