= Athletics at the 2008 Summer Paralympics – Women's 400 metres T53 =

Women's 400m T53 at the XIII Paralympic Games
- Venue: Beijing National Stadium
- Dates: 10 September
- Competitors: 12 from 10 nations
- Winning time: 54.88

Medalists
1st place, gold medalist(s)		Jessica Galli	United States
2nd place, silver medalist(s)		Zhou Hongzhuan	China
3rd place, bronze medalist(s)		Anjali Forber Pratt	United States

The women's 400m T53 event at the 2008 Summer Paralympics took place at the Beijing National Stadium on 10 September. There were two heats; the first 3 in each heat (Q) plus the 2 fastest other times (q) qualified.

== Results ==
=== Heats ===
Competed from 18:52.

==== Heat 1 ====
Rank	Name	Nationality	Time	Notes
1	Cheri Blauwet	United States	1:00.03	Q
2	Ilana Duff	Canada	1:00.80	Q
3	Angie Ballard	Australia	1:01.02	Q
4	Francesca Porcellato	Italy	1:01.05	q
5	Evelyn Enciso	Mexico	1:03.31	q
6	Thi Thanh Thao Nguyen	Vietnam	1:08.75	

==== Heat 2 ====
Rank	Name	Nationality	Time	Notes
1	Jessica Galli	United States	56.10	Q, PR
2	Zhou Hongzhuan	China	57.68	Q
3	Anjali Forber Pratt	United States	58.76	Q
4	Yadira Soturno	Venezuela	1:04.80	
5	Patrice Dockery	Ireland	1:08.95	
	Madelene Nordlund	Sweden		DNS

=== Final ===
Competed at 18:10.

Rank	Name	Nationality	Time	Notes
1st place, gold medalist(s)	Jessica Galli	United States	54.88	WR
2nd place, silver medalist(s)	Zhou Hongzhuan	China	55.28	
3rd place, bronze medalist(s)	Anjali Forber Pratt	United States	56.79	
4	Cheri Blauwet	United States	57.07	
5	Francesca Porcellato	Italy	58.83	
6	Ilana Duff	Canada	58.93	
7	Angie Ballard	Australia	59.82	
8	Evelyn Enciso	Mexico	1:01.89	

Q = qualified for final by place. q = qualified by time. WR = World Record. PR = Paralympic Record. DNS = Did not start.
