= Athletics at the 2008 Summer Paralympics – Women's 800 metres T53 =

Women's 800m T53 at the XIII Paralympic Games
- Venue: Beijing National Stadium
- Dates: 15 September
- Competitors: 8 from 6 nations
- Winning time: 1:57.25

Medalists
1st place, gold medalist(s)		Zhou Hongzhuan	China
2nd place, silver medalist(s)		Jessica Galli	United States
3rd place, bronze medalist(s)		Amanda McGrory	United States

The women's 800m T53 event at the 2008 Summer Paralympics took place at the Beijing National Stadium on 15 September. There were no heats in this event.

== Final ==
Competed at 17:50.

Rank	Name	Nationality	Time	Notes
1st place, gold medalist(s)	Zhou Hongzhuan	China	1:57.25	
2nd place, silver medalist(s)	Jessica Galli	United States	1:57.25	
3rd place, bronze medalist(s)	Amanda McGrory	United States	1:57.31	
4	Cheri Blauwet	United States	1:58.38	
5	Francesca Porcellato	Italy	2:01.99	
6	Angie Ballard	Australia	2:02.56	
7	Evelyn Enciso	Mexico	2:02.99	
	Madelene Nordlund	Sweden		DNS

DNS = Did not start.
