= Athletics at the 2008 Summer Paralympics – Men's 100 metres T44 =

Paralympics 2008

Men's 100 metres T44 at the XIII Paralympic Games
- Venue: Beijing National Stadium
- Dates: 8 September – 9 September
- Competitors: 12 from 10 nations
- Winning time: 11.17

Medalists
1st place, gold medalist(s)		Oscar Pistorius	South Africa
2nd place, silver medalist(s)		Jerome Singleton	United States
3rd place, bronze medalist(s)		Brian Frasure	United States

The Men's 100m T44 had its first round held on September 8 at 20:22 and the Final on September 9 at 17:52.

== Results ==
Place	Athlete	Class	Round 1	Final
1	Oscar Pistorius (RSA)	T43	11.16 Q =PR	11.17
2	Jerome Singleton (USA)	T44	11.48 Q	11.20
3	Brian Frasure (USA)	T44	11.49 Q	11.50
4	Arnu Fourie (RSA)	T44	12.05 q	11.65
5	Stephen Wilson (AUS)	T44	11.87 Q	11.78
6	Christoph Bausch (SUI)	T44	12.03 Q	12.03
7	Heros Marai (ITA)	T44	12.05 q	12.25
8	Marlon Shirley (USA)	T44	11.77 Q	34.43
9	Michael Linhart (AUT)	T44	12.11	
10	Andre Luiz Oliveira (BRA)	T44	12.12	
11	Antonio Flores (MLT)	T44	12.71	
12	Vanna Kim (CAM)	T44	13.45	
