= Swimming at the 2008 Summer Paralympics – Women's 400 metre freestyle S7 =

Women's 400m Freestyle S7 at the XIII Paralympic Games
- Venue: Beijing National Aquatics Center
- Dates: 11 September
- Competitors: 11 from 8 nations
- Winning time: 5:17.41

Medalists
1st place, gold medalist(s)		Erin Popovich	United States
2nd place, silver medalist(s)		Cortney Jordan	United States
3rd place, bronze medalist(s)		Kirsten Bruhn	Germany

The women's 400m freestyle S7 event at the 2008 Summer Paralympics took place at the Beijing National Aquatics Center on 11 September. There were two heats; the swimmers with the eight fastest times advanced to the final.

== Results ==
=== Heats ===
Competed from 09:15.

==== Heat 1 ====
Rank	Name	Nationality	Time	Notes
1	Cortney Jordan	United States	5:31.27	Q
2	Chantal Boonacker	Netherlands	5:35.89	Q
3	Kirsten Bruhn	Germany	5:43.32	Q
4	Brianna Nelson	Canada	6:01.16	Q
5	Laura Jensen	Canada	6:02.13	

==== Heat 2 ====
Rank	Name	Nationality	Time	Notes
1	Erin Popovich	United States	5:34.18	Q
2	Katrina Porter	Australia	5:43.88	Q
3	Oxana Guseva	Russia	5:50.89	Q
4	Kim Ji Eun	South Korea	5:54.76	Q
5	Deborah Gruen	United States	6:05.90	
6	Natasa Sobocan	Croatia	6:32.66	

=== Final ===
Competed at 17:09.

Rank	Name	Nationality	Time	Notes
1st place, gold medalist(s)	Erin Popovich	United States	5:17.41	PR
2nd place, silver medalist(s)	Cortney Jordan	United States	5:21.01	
3rd place, bronze medalist(s)	Kirsten Bruhn	Germany	5:28.22	
4	Chantal Boonacker	Netherlands	5:35.31	
5	Katrina Porter	Australia	5:44.93	
6	Oxana Guseva	Russia	5:46.61	
7	Kim Ji Eun	South Korea	5:51.52	
8	Brianna Nelson	Canada	6:00.99	

Q = qualified for final. PR = Paralympic Record.
