= Athletics at the 2008 Summer Paralympics – Men's 400 metres T44 =

Event at the 2008 Summer Paralympics

Men's 400 metres T44 at the XIII Paralympic Games
- Venue: London Olympic Stadium
- Dates: 16 September
- Competitors: 7 from 5 nations
- Winning time: 47.49

Medalists
1st place, gold medalist(s)		Oscar Pistorius	South Africa
2nd place, silver medalist(s)		Jim Bob Bizzell	United States
3rd place, bronze medalist(s)		Ian Jones	Great Britain

The Men's 400m T44 had its Final held on September 16 at 20:57.

== Results ==
Place	Athlete	Class	Final
1	Oscar Pistorius (RSA)	T43	47.49 WR
2	Jim Bob Bizzell (USA)	T44	50.98
3	Ian Jones (GBR)	T44	51.69
4	Danny Andrews (USA)	T44	53.15
5	Stephen Wilson (AUS)	T44	55.49
6	Michael Linhart (AUT)	T44	55.76
	Casey Tibbs (USA)	T44	DNS
