= Swimming at the 2008 Summer Paralympics – Women's 200 metre individual medley SM7 =

Women's 200m Individual Medley SM7 at the XIII Paralympic Games
- Venue: Beijing National Aquatics Center
- Dates: 7 September
- Competitors: 13 from 8 nations
- Winning time: 2:54.61

Medalists
1st place, gold medalist(s)		Erin Popovich	United States
2nd place, silver medalist(s)		Huang Min	China
3rd place, bronze medalist(s)		Cortney Jordan	United States

The women's 200m individual medley SM7 event at the 2008 Summer Paralympics took place at the Beijing National Aquatics Center on 7 September. There were two heats; the swimmers with the eight fastest times advanced to the final.

== Results ==
=== Heats ===
Competed from 10:25.

==== Heat 1 ====
Rank	Name	Nationality	Time	Notes
1	Shelley Rogers	Australia	3:17.34	Q
2	Huang Min	China	3:21.00	Q
3	Oxana Guseva	Russia	3:24.21	Q
4	Margita Prokeinova	Slovakia	3:29.86	Q
5	Laura Jensen	Canada	3:30.98	
	Brianna Nelson	Canada		DQ

==== Heat 2 ====
Rank	Name	Nationality	Time	Notes
1	Erin Popovich	United States	3:01.21	Q, PR
2	Cortney Jordan	United States	3:15.89	Q
3	Gitta Raczko	Hungary	3:28.30	Q
4	Deborah Gruen	United States	3:29.16	Q
5	Lalita Loureiro	Sweden	3:33.05	
6	Steph McDougall	Canada	3:46.26	
	Katrina Porter	Australia		DQ

=== Final ===
Competed at 19:17.

Rank	Name	Nationality	Time	Notes
1st place, gold medalist(s)	Erin Popovich	United States	2:54.61	WR
2nd place, silver medalist(s)	Huang Min	China	3:00.65	
3rd place, bronze medalist(s)	Cortney Jordan	United States	3:07.96	
4	Shelley Rogers	Australia	3:12.68	
5	Margita Prokeinova	Slovakia	3:19.01	
6	Oxana Guseva	Russia	3:19.50	
7	Deborah Gruen	United States	3:27.48	
8	Gitta Raczko	Hungary	3:30.36	

Q = qualified for final. WR = World Record. PR = Paralympic Record. DQ = Disqualified.
