= Athletics at the 2008 Summer Paralympics – Men's 200 metres T44 =

The Men's 200m T44 had its whole competition held on September 13, with the First Round at 10:26 and the Final at 19:00.

== Medalists ==
Gold	Oscar Pistorius; South Africa
Silver	Jim Bob Bizzell; United States
Bronze	Ian Jones; Great Britain

== Results ==
Place	Athlete	Class	Round 1	Final
1	Oscar Pistorius (RSA)	T43	22.71 Q	21.67 PR
2	Jim Bob Bizzell (USA)	T44	23.22 Q	22.62
3	Ian Jones (GBR)	T44	23.67 Q	23.00
4	Casey Tibbs (USA)	T44	24.01 Q	23.40
5	Danny Andrews (USA)	T44	24.22 Q	23.54
6	Arnu Fourie (RSA)	T44	24.17 Q	23.87
7	Alan Fonteles Cardoso Oliveira (BRA)	T43	24.31 q	24.21
8	Christoph Bausch (SUI)	T44	24.89 q	24.61
9	Heros Marai (ITA)	T44	24.95	
10	Vanna Kim (CAM)	T44	28.32	
