= Athletics at the 2004 Summer Paralympics – Men's pentathlon P44 =

Men's Pentathlon P44 at the XII Paralympic Games
- Venue: Athens Olympic Stadium
- Dates: 22 September 2004
- Competitors: 8 from 7 nations
- Winning points: 4447

Medalists
| 1st place, gold medalist(s) | | Urs Kolly | Switzerland |
| 2nd place, silver medalist(s) | | Casey Tibbs | United States |
| 3rd place, bronze medalist(s) | | Don Elgin | Australia |

The Men's pentathlon P44 event for amputee athletes at the 2004 Summer Paralympics was held in the Athens Olympic Stadium on 22 September. It was won by Urs Kolly, representing Switzerland.

Schedule
| Long Jump | 09:00 |
| Shot Put | 11:00 |
| 100 metres | 12:42 |
| Discus | 18:30 |
| 400 metres | 21:30 |

| Rank | Athlete | Points | Notes |
|---|---|---|---|
| 1st place, gold medalist(s) | Urs Kolly (SUI) | 4447 | WR |
| 2nd place, silver medalist(s) | Casey Tibbs (USA) | 4422 | |
| 3rd place, bronze medalist(s) | Don Elgin (AUS) | 4152 | |
| 4 | Roberto la Barbera (ITA) | 4127 | |
| 5 | Tomas Kairys (LTU) | 3874 | |
| 6 | Xavier le Draoullec (FRA) | 3831 | |
| 7 | Philippe Ramon (FRA) | 3625 | |
| 8 | Harald von Koch (SWE) | 3324 | |
