= Athletics at the 2008 Summer Paralympics – Women's 4 × 100 metre relay T53–T54 =

Women's 4x100m T53-54 at the XIII Paralympic Games
- Venue: Beijing National Stadium
- Dates: 16 September
- Competitors: 4
- Winning time: 57.61

Medalists
1st place, gold medalist(s)		China (CHN); Dong Hongjiao, Liu Wenjun, Huang Lisha, Zhang Ting
2nd place, silver medalist(s)		Australia (AUS); Madison de Rozario, Christie Dawes, Angie Ballard, Jemima Moore
3rd place, bronze medalist(s)		United States (USA); Tatyana McFadden, Anjali Forber Pratt, Amanda McGrory, Jessica Galli

The women's 4x100m T53-54 event at the 2008 Summer Paralympics took place at the Beijing National Stadium on 16 September. There were no heats in this event. The event was won by the team representing China (CHN).

== Results ==
=== Final ===
Competed 16 September at 20:18.

Rank	Nation	Swimmers	Time	Notes
1st place, gold medalist(s)	China	Dong Hongjiao; Liu Wenjun; Huang Lisha; Zhang Ting	57.61	WR
2nd place, silver medalist(s)	Australia	Madison de Rozario; Christie Dawes; Angie Ballard; Jemima Moore	1:01.91	
3rd place, bronze medalist(s)	United States	Tatyana McFadden; Anjali Forber Pratt; Amanda McGrory; Jessica Galli	1:02.16	
	Mexico	Gloria Sanchez; Yazmith Bataz; Evelyn Enciso; Floralia Estrada	DQ	

WR = World Record. DQ = Disqualified (passing of the baton outside the take-over zone).
