= Swimming at the 2008 Summer Paralympics – Women's 100 metre freestyle S7 =

Women's 100m Freestyle S7 at the XIII Paralympic Games
- Venue: Beijing National Aquatics Center
- Dates: 8 September
- Competitors: 8 from 6 nations
- Winning time: 1:11.82

Medalists
1st place, gold medalist(s)		Erin Popovich	United States
2nd place, silver medalist(s)		Cortney Jordan	United States
3rd place, bronze medalist(s)		Kirsten Bruhn	Germany

The women's 100m freestyle S7 event at the 2008 Summer Paralympics took place at the Beijing National Aquatics Center on 8 September. There were no heats in this event.

== Final ==
Competed at 18:15.

Rank	Name	Nationality	Time	Notes
1st place, gold medalist(s)	Erin Popovich	United States	1:11.82	PR
2nd place, silver medalist(s)	Cortney Jordan	United States	1:12.09	
3rd place, bronze medalist(s)	Kirsten Bruhn	Germany	1:12.93	
4	Chantal Boonacker	Netherlands	1:14.59	
5	Kim Ji Eun	South Korea	1:18.54	
6	Laura Jensen	Canada	1:18.65	
7	Brianna Nelson	Canada	1:19.11	
8	Oxana Guseva	Russia	1:20.68	

PR = Paralympic Record.
