= Cycling at the 2008 Summer Paralympics – Women's individual pursuit (LC 1–2/CP 4) =

Women's individual pursuit (LC 1-2/CP 4) at the XIII Paralympic Games
- Venue: Laoshan Velodrome
- Dates: September 10
- Competitors: 10 from 5.5 nations
- Winning time: 0:00.000

Medalists
1st place, gold medalist(s)		Sarah Storey	Great Britain
2nd place, silver medalist(s)		Jennifer Schuble	United States
3rd place, bronze medalist(s)		Dong Jingping	China

The Women's individual pursuit (LC 1-2/CP 4) event at the Summer Paralympics took place on September 10 at the Laoshan Velodrome.

== Preliminaries ==
Q = Qualifier WR = World Record

Rank	Name	Class	Time	Factor (%)	Final Time with % factor
1	Jennifer Schuble (USA)	CP4	4:01.243 WR	89.335	3:35.514 Q
2	Sarah Storey (GBR)	LC1	3:40.492 WR	100.000	3:40.492 Q
3	Dong Jingping (CHN)	LC2	4:13.412	90.418	3:49.130 Q
4	Ye Yaping (CHN)	LC2	4:16.043	90.418	3:51.508 Q
5	Greta Neimanas (USA)	LC1	3:57.966	100.000	3:57.966
6	Zhou Jufang (CHN)	LC1	4:00.504	100.000	4:00.504
7	Silvana Vinci (ITA)	CP4	4:31.057	89.335	4:02.148
8	Fiona Southorn (NZL)	LC1	4:06.965	100.000	4:06.965
9	Roxy Burns (RSA)	CP4	4:36.900	89.335	4:07.368
10	Anita Ruetz (AUT)	CP4	4:56.779	89.335	4:25.127

== Finals ==
Gold medal match

Name	Class	Time	Factor (%)	Final Time with % factor	Rank
Sarah Storey (GBR)	LC1	3:36.637 WR	100.000	3:36.637	1
Jennifer Schuble (USA)	LC1	4:02.758	89.335	3:36.867	2

Bronze medal match

Name	Class	Time	Factor (%)	Final Time with % factor	Rank
Dong Jingping (CHN)	LC2	4:14.103	90.418	3:49.754	3
Ye Yaping (CHN)	LC2	4:19.711	90.418	3:54.825	4
