= Swimming at the 2008 Summer Paralympics – Women's 100 metre breaststroke SB7 =

Women's 100m Breaststroke SB7 at the XIII Paralympic Games
- Venue: Beijing National Aquatics Center
- Dates: 9 September
- Competitors: 8 from 5 nations
- Winning time: 1:31.60

Medalists
1st place, gold medalist(s)		Erin Popovich	United States
2nd place, silver medalist(s)		Huang Min	China
3rd place, bronze medalist(s)		Jessica Long	United States

The women's 100m breaststroke SB7 event at the 2008 Summer Paralympics took place at the Beijing National Aquatics Center on 9 September. There were no heats in this event.

== Final ==
Competed at 19:43.

Rank	Name	Nationality	Time	Notes
1st place, gold medalist(s)	Erin Popovich	United States	1:31.60	WR
2nd place, silver medalist(s)	Huang Min	China	1:35.51	
3rd place, bronze medalist(s)	Jessica Long	United States	1:38.60	
4	Lu Hongmei	China	1:43.18	
5	Rhiannon Oliver	Australia	1:45.49	
6	Bernadette Massar	Netherlands	1:49.29	
7	Brianna Nelson	Canada	1:54.35	
8	Laura Jensen	Canada	1:56.33	

WR = World Record.
