= Claudemir Santos =

Brazilian Paralympic athlete

Personal information
- Full name: Claudemir do Nascimento Santos
- Born: 1974 or 1975 (age 51–52) Rio de Janeiro, Brazil

Sport
- Sport: Para athletics
- Disability class: T46
- Event: Sprint
Medal record
Men's para athletics
Representing Brazil
Paralympic Games
Silver medal – second place	2008 Beijing	4x100m - T42-46

Claudemir do Nascimento Santos is a Paralympian athlete from Brazil competing mainly in category T46 sprint events.

Claudemir competed at the 2008 Summer Paralympics in Beijing. He won a silver medal in theT42-46 4 × 100 m as part of the Brazilian team, after failing to medal in the T46 200m.
