= Athletics at the 2008 Summer Paralympics – Men's 4 × 100 metre relay T42–T46 =

2008 Summer Paralympics

Men's 4x100m T42-46 at the XIII Paralympic Games
- Venue: Beijing National Stadium
- Dates: 16 September 2008
- Competitors: 5
- Winning time: 42.75

Medalists
1st place, gold medalist(s)		United States (USA); Jim Bob Bizzell, Brian Frasure, Casey Tibbs, Jerome Singleton
2nd place, silver medalist(s)		Brazil (BRA); Andre Luiz Oliveira, Yohansson Nascimento, Claudemir Santos, Alan Oliveira
3rd place, bronze medalist(s)		Australia (AUS); Heath Francis, Stephen Wilson, Aaron Chatman, Paul Raison

The men's 4 × 100 m T42-46 event at the 2008 Summer Paralympics took place at the Beijing National Stadium on 16 September 2008. There were no heats in this event.

== Results ==
=== Final ===
Competed at 19:45.

Rank	Nation	Swimmers	Time	Notes
1st place, gold medalist(s)	United States	Jim Bob Bizzell; Brian Frasure; Casey Tibbs; Jerome Singleton	42.75	WR
2nd place, silver medalist(s)	Brazil	Andre Luiz Oliveira; Yohansson Nascimento; Claudemir Santos; Alan Oliveira	45.25	
3rd place, bronze medalist(s)	Australia	Heath Francis; Stephen Wilson; Aaron Chatman; Paul Raison	45.80	
4	France	Xavier le Draoullec; Arnaud Assoumani; Serge Ornem; Clavel Kayitaré	46.68	
	Japan	Naohiro Ninomiya; Tomoki Tagawa; Toru Suzuki; Atsushi Yamamoto	DQ	

WR = World Record. DQ = Disqualified (passing of the baton outside the take-over zone).
