= Swimming at the 2008 Summer Paralympics – Women's 100 metre butterfly S8 =

Women's 100m Butterfly S8 at the XIII Paralympic Games
- Venue: Beijing National Aquatics Center
- Dates: 7 September
- Competitors: 12 from 9 nations
- Winning time: 1:11.96

Medalists
1st place, gold medalist(s)		Jessica Long	United States
2nd place, silver medalist(s)		Amanda Everlove	United States
3rd place, bronze medalist(s)		Jin Xiaoqin	China

The women's 100m butterfly S8 event at the 2008 Summer Paralympics took place at the Beijing National Aquatics Center on 7 September. There were two heats; the swimmers with the eight fastest times advanced to the final.

== Results ==
=== Heats ===
Competed from 10:39.

==== Heat 1 ====
Rank	Name	Nationality	Time	Notes
1	Chen Zhonglan	China	1:16.24	Q
2	Jin Xiaoqin	China	1:17.26	Q
3	Immacolata Cerasuolo	Italy	1:17.50	Q
4	Anna Vengerovskaya	Russia	1:22.58	
5	Stefanie Weinberg	Germany	1:23.48	
6	Valeria Lira	Brazil	1:32.58	

==== Heat 2 ====
Rank	Name	Nationality	Time	Notes
1	Amanda Everlove	United States	1:11.64	Q
2	Jessica Long	United States	1:12.54	Q
3	Lu Weiyuan	China	1:16.18	Q
4	Rachael Latham	Great Britain	1:17.72	Q
5	Manami Nomura	Japan	1:21.94	Q
6	Andrea Cole	Canada	1:32.78	

=== Final ===
Competed at 19:47.

Rank	Name	Nationality	Time	Notes
1st place, gold medalist(s)	Jessica Long	United States	1:11.96	
2nd place, silver medalist(s)	Amanda Everlove	United States	1:12.16	
3rd place, bronze medalist(s)	Jin Xiaoqin	China	1:15.32	
4	Chen Zhonglan	China	1:15.76	
5	Lu Weiyuan	China	1:16.67	
6	Immacolata Cerasuolo	Italy	1:17.14	
7	Rachael Latham	Great Britain	1:18.61	
8	Manami Nomura	Japan	1:20.64	

Q = qualified for final.
