= Jim Bob Bizzell =

American Paralympic sprinter (born 1985)

Personal information
- Nationality: American
- Born: 22 November 1985 (age 40)

Sport
- Sport: Running
Medal record
Representing United States
Track and field (T44)
Paralympic Games
Gold medal – first place	2008 Beijing	4x100m - T42-46
Silver medal – second place	2008 Beijing	200m - T44
Silver medal – second place	2008 Beijing	400m - T44

Jim Bob Bizzell (born November 22, 1985) is a Paralympian athlete from the United States competing mainly in category T44 sprint events.

He competed in the 2008 Summer Paralympics in Beijing, China. There he won a gold medal in the men's 4 x 100 metre relay (T42-46 event), a silver medal in the men's 200 metres (T44 event), and a silver medal in the men's 400 metres (T44 event).
