= Tucker Dupree =

American Paralympic swimmer (born 1989)

Personal information
- Nationality: United States
- Born: May 11, 1989 (age 37) Raleigh, North Carolina, U.S.
- Height: 6 ft 1 in (185 cm)
- Weight: 160 lb (73 kg)

Sport
- Sport: Swimming
- Strokes: Backstroke, freestyle
Medal record
Men's swimming
Representing the United States
Event	1st	2nd	3rd
Paralympic Games	G	S	B
Total	GG	SS	BB
Event	1st	2nd	3rd
50 m backstroke	0	0	0
100 m backstroke	0	1	0
200 m backstroke	0	0	0
50 m breaststroke	0	0	0
100 m breaststroke	0	0	0
200 m breaststroke	0	0	0
50 m butterfly	0	0	0
100 m butterfly	0	0	0
200 m butterfly	0	0	0
50 m freestyle	0	0	1
2012 Paralympic Games
Silver medal – second place	2012 London	100 m backstroke S12
Bronze medal – third place	2012 London	50 m freestyle S12
Bronze medal – third place	2012 London	100 m freestyle S12
Bronze medal – third place	2016 Rio de Janeiro	100 m backstroke S12

Tucker Dupree is an American swimmer. He won three medals at the 2012 Paralympic Games and one at the 2016 Paralympic Games. He has also set multiple world and American records in swimming. He competes in the Paralympic classes S12/SB12/SM12.

== Results ==
=== 2007 ===
Dupree won the 100m butterfly, 100m backstroke and 200m individual medley, and took second in the 50m, 100m and 400m freestyle at the Long Course Can-Am Swimming Championships.

=== 2008 ===
In 2008, Dupree qualified for the U.S. Paralympic Swimming Team by placing first at the team trials in the 100m butterfly, 100m backstroke, 200m individual medley, 50m, 100m and 400m freestyle. At the Paralympic Games in Beijing he took 4 place in the 400m freestyle, 5th in the 100m butterfly and 100m backstroke, 6th place in the 50m freestyle and 100m backstroke, and 7th in the 100m freestyle. At the Long Course Can-Am Swimming Championships he placed second in the 100m butterfly and 200m individual medley and third in the 50m, 100m and 400m freestyle.

=== 2009 ===
Dupree won the 100 butterfly at the 2009 World Championships. He also won silver medals in the 50m freestyle, 100m backstroke, and bronze medals in the 100m and 400m freestyle. At the Long Course Can-Am Swimming Championships he took first in the 50m and 100m butterfly, 100m backstroke, 50m and 100m Freestyle). At the Short Course Canadian American Championships he won the 50m and 100m butterfly, 100m backstroke, 50m, and 100m freestyle.

=== 2010 ===
At his second World Championships, he took silver in the 100m freestyle, and bronze in the 100 backstroke, 50m freestyle, 400m freestyle, 100 fly. At the Long Course CAN-AM Swimming Championships Dupree won the 50m and 100m freestyle, 200m individual medley, 100m backstroke, 100m butterfly and 400m freestyle. At the Short Course Can-Am Swimming Championships he won first place in the 50m and 100m freestyle, 200m individual medley, 100m backstroke, 100m butterfly and 400m freestyle.

=== 2011 ===
Dupree made his first Pan Pacific team, and placed first at the championship in the 400m freestyle, second in the 100m butterfly, 500m freestyle and 100m backstroke, and third in the 100m freestyle.

=== 2012 ===
At the U.S. Paralympics Swimming Team Trials he won the 50m and 100m freestyle, 100m backstroke and 100m butterfly. In 2012 Dupree held 2 World records, and was ranked first in the world in the 50m and 200m butterfly, 2nd in the 50m Backstroke, 50m and 100m freestyle, and 3rd in the 50m breaststroke, 100m backstroke and 400m freestyle. At the Long Course Can-Am Swimming Championships he won the 50m butterfly, 50m freestyle, 50m and 100m backstroke.

=== 2013 ===
Dupree won a silver in the 100m backstroke, bronze in the 50m freestyle at the 2013 IPC World Championships. He took first in the 100 freestyle, 50 freestyle, 100 backstroke, and 100 fly at the Spring Can-Am swimming championship.

=== 2014 ===
In 2014, Dupree won the 100 freestyle, 50 freestyle, and 100 backstroke at the Can-Am National swimming Championship.

=== 2015 ===
Dupree won a bronze medal in the 100m backstroke at the IPC Swimming World Championships. He took first in the 50m free and set an American Record at the Can-Am Swimming Championship.

=== 2016 ===
Dupree is expected to compete at the 2016 Paralympic Games in Rio.

== Personal ==
At the age of 17, Dupree was diagnosed with Leber’s Hereditary Optic Neuropathy. He lost most of his central vision in both eyes. Dupree lives in Chicago and has a tattoo of the Olympic rings on his shoulder.

== Awards ==
2007 WSY Andy Craver Determination Award Tim Stevens Scholarship Award Winner 2008 The Greater Raleigh Sports Council Courage of Character Award 2011 Roger McCarville Male Athlete of the Year Award
