= Jarrett Perry =

American Paralympic athlete

Personal information
- Born: Wichita, Kansas
- Education: University of Colorado Colorado Springs
Medal record
Paralympic Games
Gold medal – first place	2004 Athens	Men's 100 metre backstroke S9
Bronze medal – third place	2008 Beijing	Men's 100 metre backstroke S9

Jarrett Perry is an American former para-swimmer. He won a gold medal at the 2004 Summer Paralympics in the Men's 100 metre backstroke S9 and a bronze medal at the 2008 Summer Paralympics in the same category.

== Early life ==
Perry was born to parents Vicky and Craig in Wichita, Kansas alongside his twin brother Mac.Perry also has an older sister Tegan Perry Bonham. The pair was diagnosed with twin-to-twin transfusion syndrome at birth which forced doctors to amputate Perry's leg. He began swimming at a young age and by six years old was specializing in the 25-yard butterfly. In 1997, while attending Coleman Middle School, he won six medals after competing at the Disabled Sports USA National Summer Games.

== Career ==
As a seventh-grader at Coleman Middle School, Perry became the youngest swimmer selected for the US swimming team in international competition. In his first year with the team, he earned five gold medals, three silver, and one bronze. In 2000, Perry held American records in the 200-meter backstroke and 200-meter freestyle and a world record in the 400-meter individual medley. As a result, he attempted to qualify for the 2000 Summer Paralympics. Although he failed to qualify for those Olympics, Perry qualified for the 2004 Summer Paralympics by beating his own record with a time of 1 minute and 5.66 seconds. In his Paralympcis debut, Perry won a gold medal in the Men's 100 metre backstroke S9 while also setting the Paralympic world record in the 200-meter backstroke. Perry returned to the Paralympic Games in 2008 where he won a bronze medal in the Men's 100 metre backstroke S9.

Perry attended the University of Colorado Colorado Springs.
