= Jerome Singleton =

American Paralympic sprinter

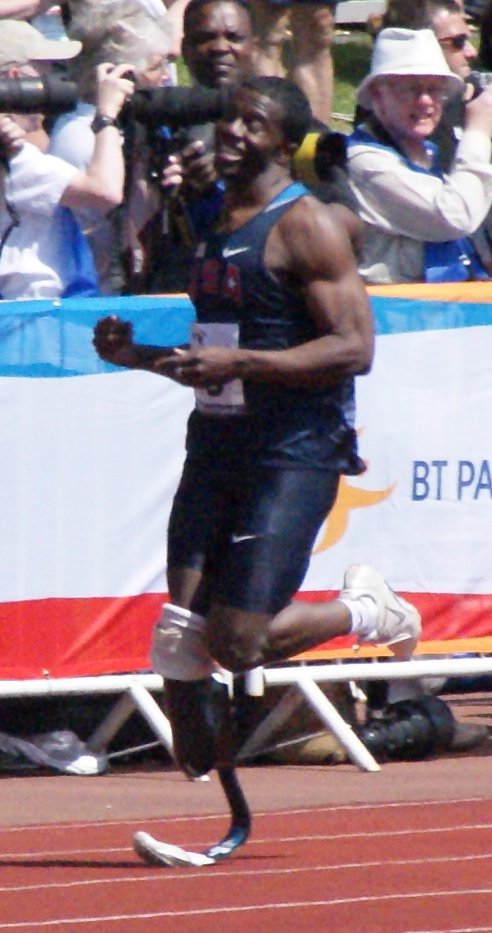

Personal information
- Full name: Jerome Singleton Jr.
- Nickname: Professor Speed
- Born: July 7, 1986 (age 40) Greenwood, South Carolina, U.S.
- Education: University of Michigan
- Website: profile on paralympic.org

Sport
- Country: USA
- Sport: Track and field
- Events: 100m, 200m, 4x100m
- Club: Paralympic Track & Field Resident Team (Olympic Training Center)
Medal record
Men's paralympic athletics
Representing United States
Paralympic Games
| Gold medal – first place | 2008 Beijing | 4x100m T42–T46 |
| Silver medal – second place | 2008 Beijing | 100m T44 |
IPC World Championships
| Gold medal – first place | 2011 Christchurch | 100m T44 |
| Gold medal – first place | 2013 Lyon | 4x100m T42–T46 |
| Silver medal – second place | 2011 Christchurch | 200m T44 |
| Silver medal – second place | 2011 Christchurch | 4x100m T42–T46 |
| Bronze medal – third place | 2013 Lyon | 100m T44 |
| Bronze medal – third place | 2013 Lyon | 200m T44 |
Parapan American Games
| Silver medal – second place | 2007 Rio de Janeiro | 200m T44 |
| Bronze medal – third place | 2007 Rio de Janeiro | 100m T44 |

Jerome Singleton (born July 7, 1986) is a Paralympic athlete from the United States competing mainly in category T44 (single below knee amputation) sprint events. Because he had no fibula in his right calf, his leg was amputated below the knee when he was 18 months old.

Singleton was born in Greenwood, South Carolina, and attended Dutch Fork High School where he played varsity football, junior varsity basketball and track. He holds a bachelor's degree in math and applied physics from Morehouse College and a bachelor's in industrial and operations engineering from the University of Michigan. Singleton ran on Morehouse's track and field team for one year before transferring to the University of Michigan. He has worked as a researcher at NASA and CERN.

== Major achievements ==
- 2011: Gold medal, 100m (T43/44), Silver medal, 200m (T43/44), 4 × 100 m relay (T42-46) – IPC Athletics World Championships, Christchurch, New Zealand
- 2010: Second place, 100m (T44), 200m (T44) – U.S. Paralympics Track & Field National Championships, Miramar, Florida
- 2009: Silver medal, 100m (T44); Set new course record 11.16 seconds VISA Paralympic World Cup, Manchester, UK
- 2009: Gold medal, 100m- Boiling Point Track Classic, Windsor, Ontario, Canada
- 2009: Gold medal, 200m; silver medal, 100m – Loterias Caixa International Meeting for Athletics and Swimming, Rio de Janeiro, Brazil
- 2008: Silver medal, 100m (T44) – Paralympic Games, Beijing, China
- 2008: Gold medal, 100m; silver medal 200m – Paralympic World Cup, Manchester, UK
- 2007: Bronze medal 100m (T44), Silver medal 200m (T44) ParaPan American Games, Rio de Janeiro, Brazil
- 2007: Inducted into Phi Beta Kappa (Nation's Oldest Academic Honor Society)
- 2006: Gold medal, 100m, Long Jump, High Jump; Bronze medal, 200m – Endeavor Games, Edmond, Oklahoma
- 2006: SIAC All-Conference All-Academic Team Track and Field;
- 2006: Inducted into Beta Kappa Chi (National Scientific Honor Society);

High school

- Lettered in Varsity Football and Track
- Made Track Regional Finals in the 110 and 400m hurdles
- South Carolina High School League Scholar Athlete Award for Outstanding Athletic and Academic Achievement
- Member of National Honor Society at Dutch Fork High School
- Member of the Omega Psi Phi fraternity (Psi chapter Morehouse College)

== See also ==
- The Mechanics of Running Blades
