= Loraine Gonzales =

American wheelchair basketball player

Loraine Gonzales (born October 6, 1977) is a Wheelchair basketball player who was on the US team that won gold in Wheelchair basketball at the 2008 Summer Paralympics. She is of the Dallas–Fort Worth metroplex. Her husband David is also a wheelchair basketball player.
