= Jennifer Schuble =

American Paralympic cyclist

Personal information
- Born: July 8, 1976 (age 50) Lake Charles, Louisiana, U.S.

Cycling career
- Sport: Cycling
Medal record
Representing United States
Women's cycling
Paralympic Games
Gold medal – first place	2008 Beijing	Time trial LC1–2/CP4
Silver medal – second place	2008 Beijing	Road time trial LC1/LC2/CP4
Silver medal – second place	2008 Beijing	Individual pursuit LC1–2/CP4
Silver medal – second place	2012 London	Time trial C4–5
Bronze medal – third place	2012 London	Mixed team sprint
Parapan American Games
Gold medal – first place	2011 Guadalajara	Time trial C1–5
Gold medal – first place	2011 Guadalajara	Individual pursuit C4–5

Jennifer Schuble (born July 8, 1976, in Lake Charles, Louisiana) is an American track and road cyclist.

Schuble has a diagnosis of multiple sclerosis. She works in the automotive industry for Mercedes-Benz USA.

She was a gold medalist & two-time silver medalist at the 2008 Summer Paralympics in Beijing, China and is a two-time gold medalist at Parapan American Games. She won a silver medal & bronze at the 2012 Summer Paralympics in London. Besides medals, she also is a five-time UCI World Champion and Paralympic medalist. Schuble was also a ten-time UCI World Champion and held both World record and Paralympic record for CP4 500 and 3K. She was eight-time National champion and UCI Road World Cup champion. Jennifer also holds an American national record for C5 500, 3K, and mixed team sprint.

== Recognition ==
In 2017, Jennifer Schuble was inducted into the U.S. Army Women's Foundation Hall of Fame.
