= André Luiz Oliveira =

Brazilian Paralympic athlete

André Oliveira
Personal information
- Full name: André Luiz Oliveira
- Born: 1972 or 1973 (age 53–54) São Paulo, Brazil
- Height: 1.94 m (6 ft 4 in)

Sport
- Sport: Para athletics
- Disability class: T44
Medal record
Men's para athletics
Representing Brazil
Paralympic Games
Silver medal – second place	2008 Beijing	4x100m - T42-46

André Luiz Oliveira is a Paralympian athlete from Brazil competing mainly in category F44 long jump and T44 sprint events.

Andre Luiz competed at the 2008 Summer Paralympics in Beijing. He won a silver medal in theT42-46 4 × 100 m as part of the Brazilian team, after failing to medal in either the T44 100m or F42/44 long jump.
