= Ilana Duff =

Canadian Paralympic athlete

Medal record

Track and field (T53)

Representing Canada

Paralympic Games
Bronze medal – third place	2008 Beijing	100m T53

World Championships
Bronze medal – third place	2013 Lyon	100m T53

Parapan American Games
Bronze medal – third place	2015 Toronto	800m T53

Ilana Dupont (née Duff) is a Paralympic athlete from Canada competing mainly in category T53 sprint events.

She competed in the 2008 Summer Paralympics in Beijing, China where she won a bronze medal in the women's 100 metres – T53 event, finished fifth in the women's 200 metres – T53 event and finished sixth in the women's 400 metres – T53 event.

After retiring and marrying fellow wheelchair racer Alexandre Dupont, she made a comeback to para-athletics after watching her husband compete at the 2012 Summer Paralympics in London.

She won a bronze medal in the 100 metres T53 at the 2013 IPC Athletics World Championships in Lyon.
