= Urs Kolly =

Swiss Paralympic athlete

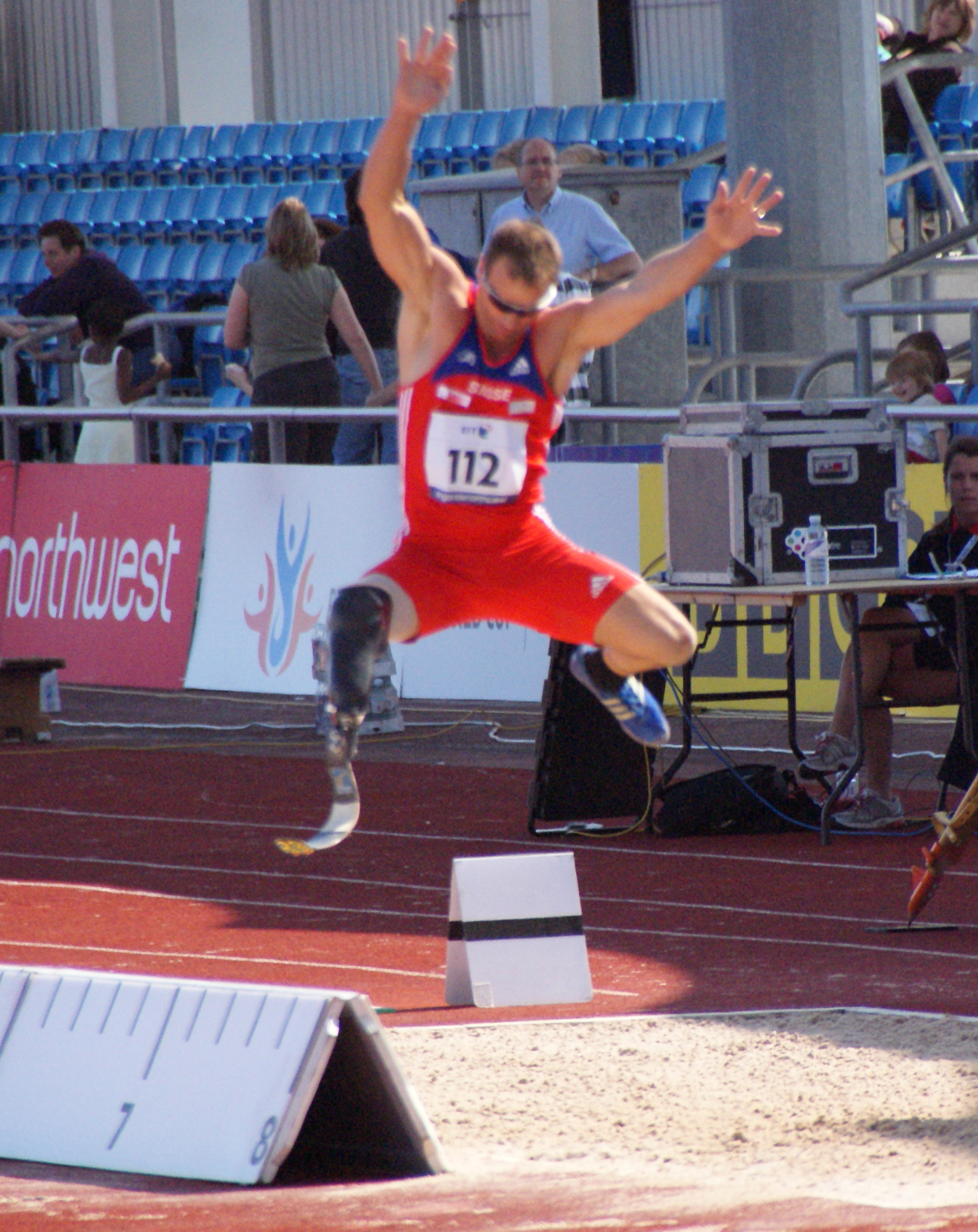
- Kolly in 2009

Personal information
- Born: 24 July 1968 (age 57) Fribourg, Switzerland

Sport
- Country: Switzerland
- Sport: Paralympic athletics
- Disability class: T44, F44, P44
Medal record
Paralympic athletics
Representing Switzerland
Paralympic Games
Gold medal – first place	1992 Barcelona	Discus throw THS3
Gold medal – first place	1996 Atlanta	Long jump F44
Gold medal – first place	1996 Atlanta	Pentathlon P44
Gold medal – first place	2000 Sydney	Long jump F44
Gold medal – first place	2000 Sydney	Pentathlon P44
Gold medal – first place	2004 Athens	Long jump F44
Gold medal – first place	2004 Athens	Pentathlon P44
Bronze medal – third place	2008 Beijing	Pentathlon P44
World Championships
Gold medal – first place	1998 Birmingham	Discus throw F44
Gold medal – first place	1998 Birmingham	Pentathlon P44
Silver medal – second place	1994 Berlin	4x100m relay T42-46
Silver medal – second place	1994 Berlin	Discus throw F44
Silver medal – second place	2002 Lille	Javelin throw F44
Bronze medal – third place	2002 Lille	Long jump F44
Bronze medal – third place	2006 Assen	Pentathlon P44
European Championships
Silver medal – second place	2003 Assen	Javelin throw F44/46
Bronze medal – third place	2005 Espoo	Javelin throw F44

Urs Kolly (born 24 July 1968 in Fribourg) is a Swiss retired Paralympic athlete who has won seven Paralympic gold medals and a bronze medal and multiple World medals. He has won one or more golds at every Summer Paralympics from 1992 to 2004. He also won a bronze at the 2008 Summer Paralympics. In addition to this he won the 2004 Credit Suisse Sports Awards for disabled athlete.
