= Deborah Gruen =

American Paralympic swimmer

Deborah Lynn Gruen
Personal information
- Nationality: United States
- Born: 1988 (age 37–38) Hamden, Connecticut
- Occupations: Attorney; Georgetown Law J.D. (2013)

Sport
- Sport: Swimming
- Strokes: breaststroke, freestyle, medley
- Club: Hamden-North Haven Swim Team; OMNI Swimming, New Haven
- College team: Yale University B.A. (2010)
- Coach: Frank Keefe (Yale)
Medal record
Swimming
Paralympic Games
Bronze medal – third place	2004 Athens	100 m breaststroke SB6
Bronze medal – third place	2008 Beijing	100 m breaststroke SB6

Deborah Lynn Gruen is a former American Paralympic swimmer who competed for Yale University, trained with the Hamden-New Haven Swim Club, and was a bronze medalist in the 100-meter breaststroke at both the 2004 Paralympic Games in Athens, and the 2008 Paralympic Games in Beijing. A varsity swimmer at Yale University, she held five world records in Paralympic swimming events. After graduating Suma Cum Laude in Economics from Yale in 2010, and Cum Laude from Georgetown Law School in 2013, she completed a clerkship with D.C. Court of Appeals Judge Roy W. McLeese III, then began practicing law in 2014 as a partner at New York's Simpson Thacher & Bartlett.

== Early life ==
Gruen was born circa 1988 in Hamden, Connecticut, to Susan, the Town Attorney, and father Jeff, who served as an Associate Pediatrics Professor at the Yale School of Medicine. She attended Hamden Hall Country Day School, a highly rated private High School, where she excelled as a student, and as a Senior was Class Valedictorian, graduating in 2006. A confident swimmer, she started swimming when she was 5-years-old, and began competing for the Hamden-North Haven Swim Club by the age of 12 around 1998, continuing to train with the club over ten years. The Hamden-North Haven Club was well within commuting distance of Yale University.

Born with Spina Bifida, Gruen was unable to swim with the use of her legs and required the use of canes to walk. Excelling as a swimmer at only twelve, she competed at the National Disability Championships where she established her first American record for paralympic competition in the 100-meter butterfly. She later was a qualifier for the Mar Del Plata, Argentina's 2002 International Paralympic Committee's Swimming World Championships, capturing a sixth-place finish in the 100-meter breaststroke, a fifth place in the 50-meter Butterfly, and a fourth place in the 400-meter freestyle.

Well recognized for her academic achievement during her High School years at Hamden Hall, she was a USA Scholastic All-American in two years, a member of the Cum Laude Society, and a Connecticut Scholar Athlete for two years. In national honors while a student at Hamden Hall, she received the Yale Book Award, presented to High School Juniors for leadership and scholarship, and the Rensselaer Medal, for outstanding performance in mathematics and science. In 2006, as a High School Senior, she received a Governor's Coalition District Scholarship for her academic achievements.

== 2004-8 Paralympic games ==
Two intensive years of training helped her to qualify for the Paralympic games. At 16, she competed in her first Paralympic Games in 2004 where she won her first bronze medal in the Games held in Athens, Greece for the 100-meter breaststroke, swimming a time in the finals of 1:46.52. Sarah Bowen of Australia took the gold, and Liz Johnson of Great Britain the silver medal. In other events, she placed seventh in the Women's 400m Freestyle, eighth in the Women's 200m Individual Medley SM7, twelfth in the Women's 50m Butterfly S7, and fifteenth in the Women's 100m Freestyle S7.

Gruen set a world paralympic record in the 200-meter breaststroke in 2008, and trained with Frank Keefe's Omni Swim Club. She captured bronze again in the breaststroke at the 2008 Summer Paralympics in Beijing, China with an American record paralympic record time in the finals of 1:44.00. Elizabeth Johnson of Great Britain took the gold, and Sarah Bowen of Australia took the silver. In other events, she placed seventh in the Women's 200m Individual Medley SM7, tenth in the Women's 400m Freestyle S7, and thirteenth in the Women's 50m Butterfly S7.

== Yale University ==
Beginning in the Fall of 2006, Gruen attended and swam with Yale University, where she competed in meets in her specialty, the 100 and 200-yard breaststroke, as well as the 200 yard free and the 200 yard IM. Hall of Fame Coach Frank Keefe coached the Yale men's and women's swim teams during Gruen's years of participation. An outstanding student during her collegiate year, Gruen cited academic excellence as a reason for her choice of Yale, and in 2008, the Yale Women's Swim team was rated the top Division I Academic All-American women's swimming program in America. She swam her best collegiate 100-yard breaststroke time of 1:38.55 at a meet with Princeton and Harvard on January 30, 2010, and her best collegiate 200-yard breaststroke time of 3:21.66 at a meet with Harvard and Princeton on February 3, 2007.

Gruen continued to train and competed in swimming with Hamden-North Haven Swim Club beginning around 1997 and throughout her time as a Yale undergraduate. As a student at Yale, she was a finalist as a Rhodes Scholar in 2009, held Phi Beta Cappa Honors, and graduated as a Senior Summa Cum Laude in 2010 with a B.A. in economics and a secondary focus in mathematics.

== Competition highlights ==
In 2009, she was awarded a silver medal at the Paralympic World Cup in Manchester, England. She set two world records in 2006 for the 200 meter breaststroke and 1500 meter freestyle at the U.S. Paralympics Swimming National Championships in San Antonio, Texas. She captured another world record in 2009 for the 400 meter individual medley at the Spring Canadian-American Championships in Portland, Oregon. Gruen has also set four American paralympic records.

In April, 2010, Gruen qualified and was selected for the International Paralympic Committee World Championship team.

== World paralympic records ==
With notable achievements as a competitive swimmer, she has held five paralympic world records. As previously noted, at the 2008 Paralympic Trials, she set a record in the 200-meter breaststroke, and at the 2006 U.S. Paralympic Swimming National Championships, she set a record in the 1500-meter freestyle. In 2008 at the Can-Am Championships, she set a record in the 800-meter freestyle, and at the 2009 Spring Can-Am Championship, she set a world record in the 400-meter IM.

=== Athletic honors ===
In 2009 as a College Junior, Gruen was awarded Yale's Francis Gordon Brown Award for displaying both great scholarship and character. At Yale she received Varsity letters all four years for swimming, and in her Senior Year received Yale's MacLeish Memorial Swimming Trophy for lofty sportsmanship ideal, and devotedness to Yale. In January 2009, she was recognized as the New Haven Register Sports Person of the Year, and was a recipient of the Connecticut Sports Writers' Alliance Bob Casey Courage Award. During Yale's graduation weekend in May 2010, she received the Amanda Walton Award given to a distinguished athlete who has performed well in competition while showing spirit and courage in overcoming challenges.

=== Later life ===
As noted, she enrolled at Yale University in 2006, graduating in 2010, where she studied Chinese at Peking University for the 2008-9 semester after competing in the Beijing Paralympics. She retired from competitive swimming in 2009, enrolled in law school at Georgetown University Law Center in 2010, and graduated Cum Laude in 2013. At Georgetown Law, she received the International Academy of Trial Lawyers Award, and was the Lead Editor for the publication Tax Lawyer. Following law school, she clerked for the Hon. Roy W. McLeese III of the District of Columbia Court of Appeals. She has worked as a corporate partner at the international law firm Simpson Thacher & Bartlett, where she began in 2014.
