= Anjali Forber-Pratt =

American wheelchair racer (born 1984)

Anjali Forber-Pratt, Ph.D.
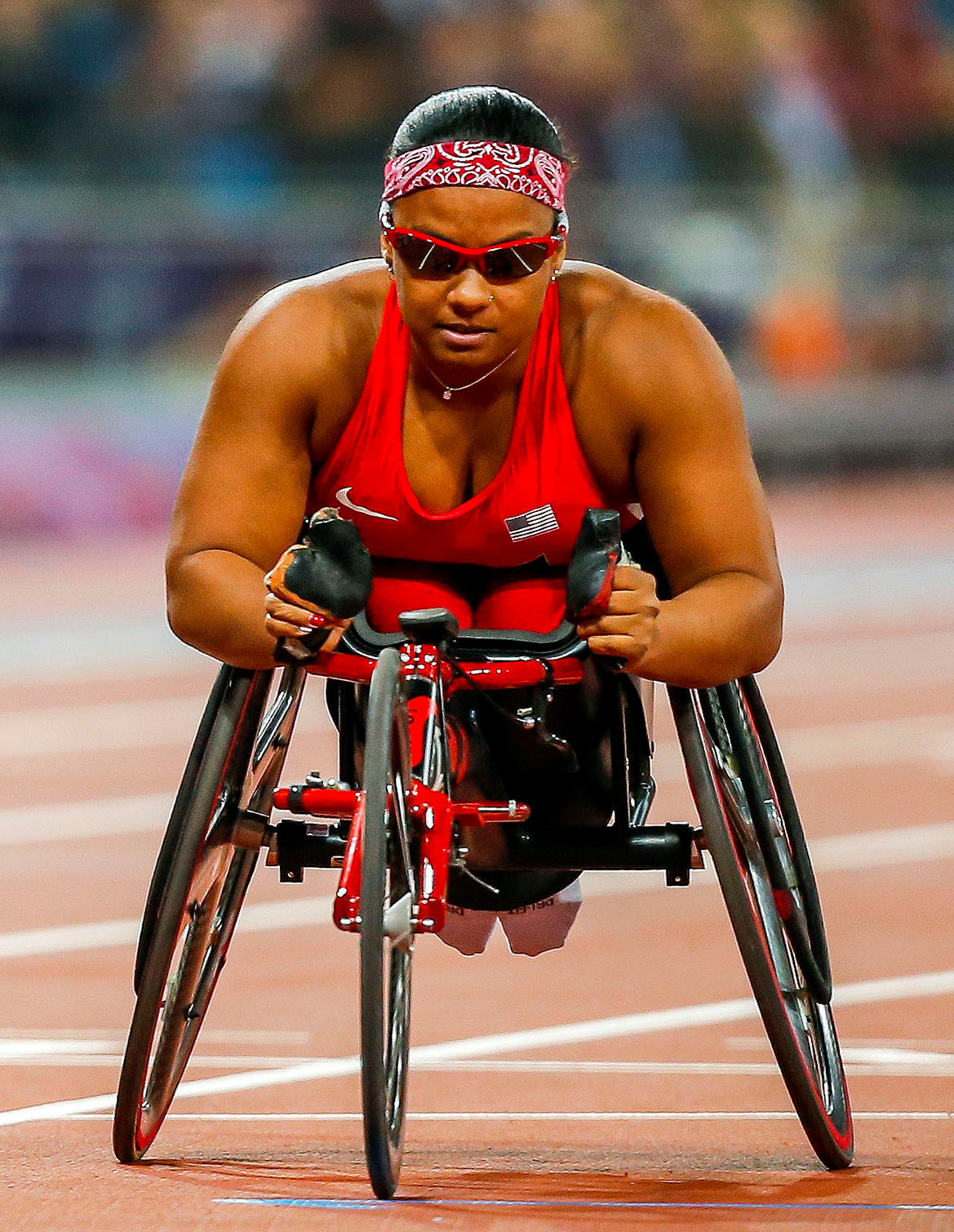
- Forber-Pratt at the 2012 Paralympics in London

Personal information
- Nationality: United States
- Born: June 22, 1984 (age 42) Kolkata, India

Sport
- Disability class: T53
- Coached by: Adam Bleakney
Medal record
Women's para athletics
Representing United States
Paralympic Games
Bronze medal – third place	2008 Beijing	400m T53
Bronze medal – third place	2008 Beijing	4x100m T53/54
World Championships
Gold medal – first place	2011 Christchurch	200m T53
Silver medal – second place	2011 Christchurch	100m T53
Silver medal – second place	2011 Christchurch	400m T53
Silver medal – second place	2011 Christchurch	4x400m T53-54
Parapan American Games
Gold medal – first place	2007 Rio de Janeiro	100m T53
Gold medal – first place	2007 Rio de Janeiro	200m T53
Bronze medal – third place	2007 Rio de Janeiro	400m T53/T54

Anjali Forber-Pratt (born June 22, 1984) is an American wheelchair racer who competed in sprint events at the Paralympic level. She is currently the Director of Research at the American Association on Health and Disability. She served as Presidential Appointee as the Director of the National Institute on Disability, Independent Living, and Rehabilitation Research (NIDILRR) from 2021-2024. Before that, she was an assistant professor at Vanderbilt University in the Department of Human & Organizational Development.

== Life ==
Born in Kolkata, India and after her mother left her, Forber-Pratt was adopted by Lawrence Pratt and Rosalind Forber when she was two and a half months old. Raised in Natick, Massachusetts, Forber-Pratt was diagnosed with transverse myelitis when she was four-and-a-half months old; the disability left her paralyzed from the waist, down. Forber-Pratt began racing at the national level in 1993 with an appearance at the Junior National Wheelchair Games, and went on to compete at the games three more times—in 1996, 1998, and 2003—winning a total of four gold, six silver, and two bronze medals. She previously held the World Record and American Record holder in the 200-meter. As a student at Natick High School, Forber-Pratt also competed in downhill skiing before graduating in 2002.

Forber-Pratt is a three-time graduate from the University of Illinois and is an alumni member of the school's wheelchair track and field team. She has received a bachelor's and master's degree in Speech Language Pathology from Illinois and earned her Ph.D. in Human Resource Education in May 2012.

Her first major international competition was the 2007 Parapan American Games in Rio de Janeiro, where she won two gold medals in the 100-meter and 200-meter races and a bronze in the 400-meter. At the 2008 Beijing Paralympics, she won a bronze medal in the 400-meter T53 event with a personal best time of 56.79 seconds and another bronze in the 4×100-meter relay T53–T54. She also competed in the 100-meter and 200-meter in Beijing, finishing sixth and fourth, respectively. She competed at the 2012 Summer Paralympics in London on Team USA in the 100m, 200m and 400m T53 events, getting sixth, fifth, and seventh place respectively.

Forber-Pratt is a former Board member of the Transverse Myelitis Association (now Siegel Rare Neuroimmune Association). The Transverse Myelitis Association is a not-for-profit international foundation dedicated to the support of children, adolescents, and adults with a spectrum of rare neuro-immune disorders including: Acute Disseminated Encephalomyelitis (ADEM), Neuromyelitis Optica Spectrum Disorder (NMOSD), Optic Neuritis (ON) and Transverse Myelitis (TM), including Acute Flaccid Myelitis (AFM). It was founded in 1994 by family members and individuals with these diagnoses and provides education, outreach and access to a clinical care network for these rare conditions. Forber-Pratt was a Board Member of Disabled Sports USA for many years (now Move United). Founded in 1967, Disabled Sports USA is an organization that provides opportunities for more than 60,000 youth, wounded warriors, and adults with disabilities each year to develop independence, confidence, and fitness through participation in disabled sports.

Forber-Pratt is also a disability advocate, and in 2002 was involved in a legal battle with her high school, fighting for equal access to education for students with disabilities. Forber-Pratt was honored by the White House as a Champion of Change by President Barack Obama in 2013 and participated in a roundtable discussion about disability policy issues with several key disability leaders. In August 2017, Forber-Pratt received the Athletes in Excellence Award from The Foundation for Global Sports Development in recognition of her community service efforts and work with youth. In 2019, she was featured by the UN Women Global Innovation Coalition for Change as part of the #SheInnovates campaign In 2021, she was appointed by the Biden administration as the Director of the National Institute on Disability, Independent Living, and Rehabilitation Research (NIDILRR).
