= Casey Tibbs (paralympian) =

American Paralympic athlete

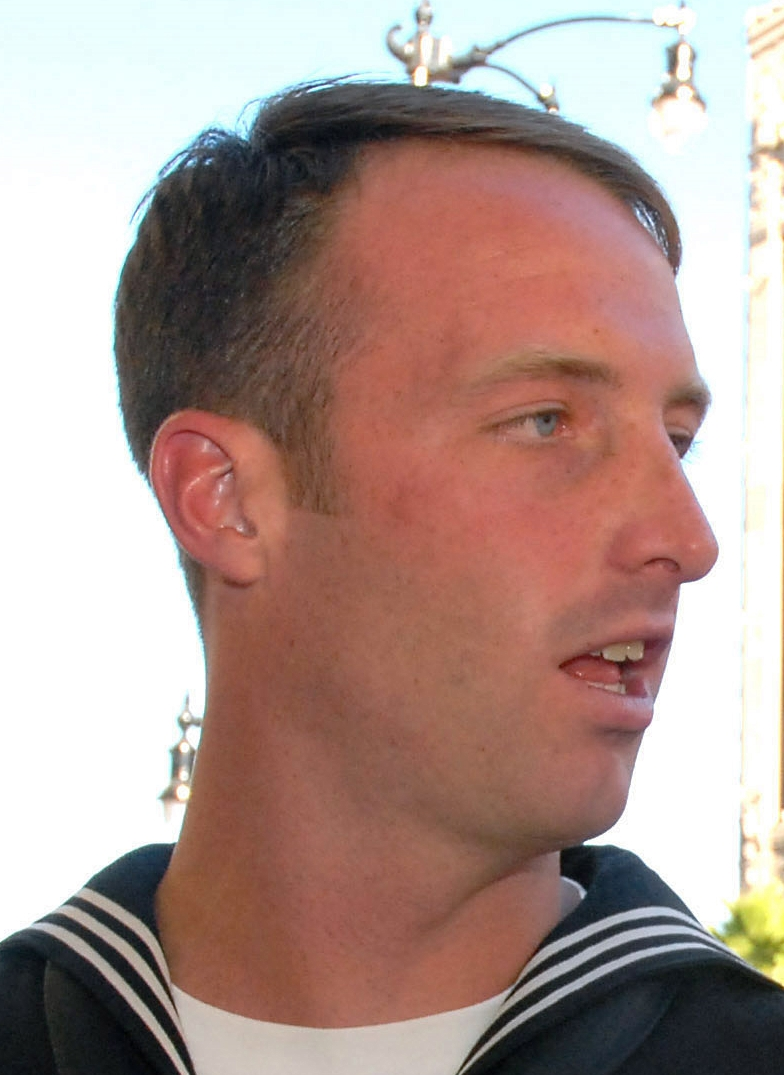

Medal record

Track and field (P44)

Representing United States

Paralympic Games
Gold medal – first place	2004 Athens	4x100m - T42-46
Gold medal – first place	2008 Beijing	4x100m - T42-46
Silver medal – second place	2004 Athens	Pentathlon - P44
Bronze medal – third place	2008 Beijing	LJ - F44

Casey Tibbs is a Paralympian athlete from the United States competing mainly in category P44 pentathlon events.

He competed in the 2004 Summer Paralympics in Athens, Greece. There he won a gold medal in the men's 4 x 100 metre relay - T42-46 event, a silver medal in the men's Pentathlon - P44 event and finished fifth in the men's 400 metres - T44 event. He also competed at the 2008 Summer Paralympics in Beijing, China. There he won a gold medal in the men's 4 x 100 metre relay - T42-46 event, a bronze medal in the men's Long jump - F44 event, did not finish in the men's Pentathlon - P44 event and finished fourth in the men's 200 metres - T44 event
