= Jessica Galli =

American wheelchair racer

Personal information
- Born: December 1, 1983 (age 42)

Sport
- Sport: Para athletics
- Disability class: T53
- Event: Wheelchair racing
Medal record
Women's para athletics
Representing United States
Paralympic Games
Gold medal – first place	2008 Beijing	400 m T53
Silver medal – second place	2000 Sydney	800 m T53
Silver medal – second place	2008 Beijing	100 m T53
Silver medal – second place	2008 Beijing	200 m T53
Silver medal – second place	2008 Beijing	800 m T53
Bronze medal – third place	2008 Beijing	4×100 m T53–T54
Bronze medal – third place	2012 London	800 m T53

Jessica Galli (born December 1, 1983) is a female wheelchair racing athlete. Raised in Hillsborough Township, New Jersey, Galli has participated in the 2000, 2004, and 2008 Paralympic Games. At the 2000 Sydney Paralympic Games she won the silver medal in the 800 meter T53 female wheelchair race. Galli set a world record holder in the T53 400 m race with a time of 55.82 at the 2007 European Wheelchair Championships on June 7 in Pratteln, Switzerland.

In January 2008, she was named the United States Olympic Committee's 2007 Paralympian of the Year. That summer, Galli was nominated for an ESPY Award for Best Female Athlete With A Disability. At the 2008 Summer Paralympics in September, she won five medals: 1 gold, 3 silver, and 1 bronze.

Galli is a paraplegic as a result of a September 1991 car accident when she was 7 years old. She became involved in Paralympic Sports by joining the Children's Lightning Wheels PSC at the recommendation of a recreational therapist at Children's Specialized Hospital, where she underwent rehabilitation.
