= Athletics at the 2004 Summer Paralympics – Men's 400 metres T52–54 =

Men's 400m races for wheelchair athletes at the 2004 Summer Paralympics were held in the Athens Olympic Stadium. Events were held in three disability classes.

== T52 ==
Men's 400m T52 at the XII Paralympic Games
- Venue: Athens Olympic Stadium
- Dates: 24–25 September 2004
- Competitors: 12 from 9 nations
- Winning time: 1:00.92

Medalists
1st place, gold medalist(s)		Toshihiro Takada	Japan
2nd place, silver medalist(s)		Andre Beaudoin	Canada
3rd place, bronze medalist(s)		Thomas Geierspichler	Austria

The T52 event consisted of 2 heats and a final. It was won by Toshihiro Takada, representing Japan.

=== 1st Round ===
Qualified for next round

Heat 1

Rank	Athlete	Time	Notes
1	Dean Bergeron (CAN)	1:01.77	Q
2	Abdellah Ez Zine (MAR)	1:04.35	Q
3	Beat Bosch (SUI)	1:04.53	Q
4	Lachlan Jones (AUS)	1:05.21	q
5	Ian Rice (CAN)	1:06.79	
	Santiago Velazquez (MEX)	1:27.30	

Heat 2

Rank	Athlete	Time	Notes
1	Andre Beaudoin (CAN)	1:01.61	Q
2	Toshihiro Takada (JPN)	1:02.03	Q
3	Thomas Geierspichler (AUT)	1:02.25	Q
4	Peth Rungsri (THA)	1:02.64	q
5	Salvador Hernandez (MEX)	1:03.61	
	Paul Nitz (USA)	1:14.65	

=== Final Round ===
Rank	Athlete	Time	Notes
1st place, gold medalist(s)	Toshihiro Takada (JPN)	1:58.68	
2nd place, silver medalist(s)	Andre Beaudoin (CAN)	1:58.69	
3rd place, bronze medalist(s)	Thomas Geierspichler (AUT)	2:00.42	
4	Abdellah Ez Zine (MAR)	2:02.06	
5	Dean Bergeron (CAN)	2:02.99	
6	Salvador Hernandez (MEX)	2:05.58	
7	Peth Rungsri (THA)	2:10.75	
8	Beat Bosch (SUI)	2:14.21	

== T53 ==
Men's 400m T53 at the XII Paralympic Games
- Venue: Athens Olympic Stadium
- Competitors: 22 from 13 nations
- Winning time: 50.04

Medalists
1st place, gold medalist(s)		Hamad Aladwani	Kuwait
2nd place, silver medalist(s)		Hong Suk Man	South Korea
3rd place, bronze medalist(s)		Joshua George	United States

The T53 event consisted of 3 heats and a final. It was won by Hamad Aladwani, representing Kuwait.

=== 1st Round ===
Qualified for next round

Heat 1

Rank	Athlete	Time	Notes
1	Adam Bleakney (USA)	51.54	Q
2	Pichet Krungget (THA)	51.72	Q
3	Charles Tolle (FRA)	54.04	
4	Susumu Kangawa (JPN)	54.04	
5	Roger Puigbo (ESP)	54.25	
6	Jason Lachance (CAN)	54.68	
	Edison Kasumaj (SUI)	55.74	

Heat 2

Rank	Athlete	Time	Notes
1	Hamad Aladwani (KUW)	51.25	Q
2	Pierre Fairbank (FRA)	52.37	Q
3	Sopa Intasen (THA)	53.41	
4	Jun Hiromichi (JPN)	53.77	
5	Mikhail Terentiev (RUS)	54.60	
6	Christopher Waddell (USA)	54.68	
7	Barry Patriquin (CAN)	57.32	

Heat 3

Rank	Athlete	Time	Notes
1	Joshua George (USA)	51.25	Q
2	Hong Suk Man (KOR)	52.37	Q
3	Richard Colman (AUS)	53.41	Q
4	Jaime Ramirez Valencia (MEX)	53.77	q
5	Heinz Frei (SUI)	54.60	
6	Sergey Shilov (RUS)	54.68	
7	Eric Gauthier (CAN)	57.32	
8	John Fulham (IRL)	55.12	

=== Final Round ===
Rank	Athlete	Time	Notes
1st place, gold medalist(s)	Hamad Aladwani (KUW)	50.04	
2nd place, silver medalist(s)	Hong Suk Man (KOR)	50.05	
3rd place, bronze medalist(s)	Joshua George (USA)	50.46	
4	Pichet Krungget (THA)	51.03	
5	Adam Bleakney (USA)	51.23	
6	Richard Colman (AUS)	51.68	
7	Pierre Fairbank (FRA)	51.96	
8	Jaime Ramirez Valencia (MEX)	53.19	

== T54 ==
Men's 800m T54 at the XII Paralympic Games
- Venue: Athens Olympic Stadium
- Competitors: 24 from 15 nations
- Winning time: 47.45

Medalists
1st place, gold medalist(s)		Kenny van Weeghel	Netherlands
2nd place, silver medalist(s)		Choke Yasuoka	Japan
3rd place, bronze medalist(s)		Jeff Adams	Canada

The T54 event consisted of 3 heats and a final. It was won by Kenny van Weeghel, representing Netherlands.

=== 1st Round ===
Qualified for next round

Heat 1

Rank	Athlete	Time	Notes
1	Rawat Tana (THA)	48.82	Q
2	Jeff Adams (CAN)	48.98	Q
3	David Weir (GBR)	49.26	q
4	Sebastian Cleem (GER)	49.37	q
5	Yoshifumi Nagao (JPN)	49.67	
6	Gonzalo Valdovinos Gonzalez (MEX)	50.13	
7	Ludovic Gapenne (FRA)	51.90	
8	Li Jun (CHN)	51.91	

Heat 2

Rank	Athlete	Time	Notes
1	Choke Yasuoka (JPN)	47.65	Q
2	Ernst van Dyk (RSA)	48.39	Q
3	Robert Figl (GER)	48.57	
4	Fernando Sanchez Nava (MEX)	48.83	
5	Claude Issorat (FRA)	49.46	
6	Ampai Sualuang (THA)	50.35	
7	Vicente Arzo (ESP)	52.26	
8	Mukhtar Kamysbayev (KAZ)	1:02.59	

Heat 3

Rank	Athlete	Time	Notes
1	Kenny van Weeghel (NED)	47.32	Q
2	Marcel Hug (SUI)	47.77	Q
3	Supachai Koysub (THA)	47.96	
4	Zhang Lixin (CHN)	48.35	
5	Freddy Sandoval (MEX)	49.01	
6	Alhassane Balde (GER)	49.04	
7	Richard Nicholson (AUS)	49.28	
8	Nkegbe Botsyo (GHA)	52.61	

=== Final Round ===
Rank	Athlete	Time	Notes
1st place, gold medalist(s)	Kenny van Weeghel (NED)	47.45	
2nd place, silver medalist(s)	Choke Yasuoka (JPN)	47.67	
3rd place, bronze medalist(s)	Jeff Adams (CAN)	47.73	
4	Rawat Tana (THA)	48.14	
5	Ernst van Dyk (RSA)	48.26	
6	Zhang Lixin (CHN)	48.72	
7	Supachai Koysub (THA)	49.01	
8	Marcel Hug (SUI)	49.30	
