= Athletics at the 2004 Summer Paralympics – Men's 800 metres T52–54 =

Men's 800m races for wheelchair athletes at the 2004 Summer Paralympics were held in the Athens Olympic Stadium. Events were held in three disability classes.

== T52 ==
Men's 800m T52 at the XII Paralympic Games
- Venue: Athens Olympic Stadium
- Dates: 24–25 September 2004
- Competitors: 12 from 9 nations
- Winning time: 1:58.68

Medalists
1st place, gold medalist(s)		Abdellah Ez Zine	Morocco
2nd place, silver medalist(s)		Thomas Geierspichler	Austria
3rd place, bronze medalist(s)		Dean Bergeron	Canada

The T52 event consisted of 2 heats and a final. It was won by Abdellah Ez Zine, representing Morocco.

=== 1st Round ===
Qualified for next round

Heat 1

24 Sept. 2004, 09:20

Rank	Athlete	Time	Notes
1	Santiago Sanz (ESP)	2:08.04	Q
2	Andre Beaudoin (CAN)	2:10.94	Q
3	Peth Rungsri (THA)	2:11.31	Q
4	Richard Reelie (CAN)	2:12.02	q
5	Per Vesterlund (SWE)	2:12.66	
	Toshihiro Takada (JPN)	DNS	

Heat 2

24 Sept. 2004, 09:28

Rank	Athlete	Time	Notes
1	Abdellah Ez Zine (MAR)	2:05.10	PR Q
2	Thomas Geierspichler (AUT)	2:05.18	Q
3	Dean Bergeron (CAN)	2:05.33	Q
4	Lachlan Jones (AUS)	2:05.42	q
5	Theodore Bridis (USA)	2:19.65	
	Tomoya Ito (JPN)	DNS	

=== Final Round ===
25 Sept. 2004, 19:35

Rank	Athlete	Time	Notes
1st place, gold medalist(s)	Abdellah Ez Zine (MAR)	1:58.68	WR
2nd place, silver medalist(s)	Thomas Geierspichler (AUT)	1:58.69	
3rd place, bronze medalist(s)	Dean Bergeron (CAN)	2:00.42	
4	Santiago Sanz (ESP)	2:02.06	
5	Andre Beaudoin (CAN)	2:02.99	
6	Richard Reelie (CAN)	2:05.58	
7	Lachlan Jones (AUS)	2:10.75	
8	Peth Rungsri (THA)	2:14.21	

== T53 ==
Men's 800m T53 at the XII Paralympic Games
- Venue: Athens Olympic Stadium
- Dates: 24–25 September 2004
- Competitors: 13 from 9 nations
- Winning time: 1:38.68

Medalists
1st place, gold medalist(s)		Richard Colman	Australia
2nd place, silver medalist(s)		Adam Bleakney	United States
3rd place, bronze medalist(s)		Jun Hiromichi	Japan

The T53 event consisted of 2 heats and a final. It was won by Richard Colman, representing Australia.

=== 1st Round ===
Qualified for next round

Heat 1

24 Sept. 2004, 19:00

Rank	Athlete	Time	Notes
1	Pierre Fairbank (FRA)	1:39.55	Q
2	Richard Colman (AUS)	1:40.33	Q
3	Roger Puigbo (ESP)	1:41.39	Q
4	Eric Gauthier (CAN)	1:42.43	q
5	Christopher Waddell (USA)	1:48.59	
6	Susumu Kangawa (JPN)	2:09.10	
	Joshua George (USA)	DNF	

Heat 2

24 Sept. 2004, 19:08

Rank	Athlete	Time	Notes
1	Adam Bleakney (USA)	1:39.48	PR Q
2	Heinz Frei (SUI)	1:40.40	Q
3	Jun Hiromichi (JPN)	1:40.58	Q
4	Sergey Shilov (RUS)	1:41.73	q
5	Charles Tolle (FRA)	1:44.55	
6	Gottfried Ferchl (AUT)	1:50.00	

=== Final Round ===
25 Sept. 2004, 17:40

Rank	Athlete	Time	Notes
1st place, gold medalist(s)	Richard Colman (AUS)	1:38.68	PR
2nd place, silver medalist(s)	Adam Bleakney (USA)	1:38.71	
3rd place, bronze medalist(s)	Jun Hiromichi (JPN)	1:38.84	
4	Pierre Fairbank (FRA)	1:38.99	
5	Roger Puigbo (ESP)	1:39.46	
6	Heinz Frei (SUI)	1:40.11	
7	Sergey Shilov (RUS)	1:40.41	
8	Eric Gauthier (CAN)	1:43.35	

== T54 ==
Men's 800m T54 at the XII Paralympic Games
- Venue: Athens Olympic Stadium
- Dates: 24–25 September 2004
- Competitors: 23 from 13 nations
- Winning time: 1:32.45

Medalists
1st place, gold medalist(s)		Choke Yasuoka	Japan
2nd place, silver medalist(s)		Ernst van Dyk	South Africa
3rd place, bronze medalist(s)		Marcel Hug	Switzerland

The T54 event consisted of 3 heats and a final. It was won by Choke Yasuoka, representing Japan.

=== 1st Round ===
Qualified for next round

Heat 1

24 Sept. 2004, 09:40

Rank	Athlete	Time	Notes
1	Ernst van Dyk (RSA)	1:35.30	Q
2	Marcel Hug (SUI)	1:35.60	Q
3	Robert Figl (GER)	1:35.85	q
4	Prawat Wahorum (THA)	1:35.93	q
5	Jeffrey Adams (CAN)	1:35.99	
6	Tyler Byers (USA)	1:42.34	
	Mukhtar Kamysbayev (KAZ)	DNS	

Heat 2

24 Sept. 2004, 09:48

Rank	Athlete	Time	Notes
1	Choke Yasuoka (JPN)	1:34.59	PR Q
2	Claude Issorat (FRA)	1:34.94	Q
3	Ralph Brunner (GER)	1:36.54	
4	Martin Velasco Soria (MEX)	1:36.76	
5	Prasit Thongchuen (THA)	1:37.17	
6	Mohamed Farhat Belkhir (TUN)	1:37.88	
7	Curtis Thom (CAN)	1:38.80	
8	Tobias Loetscher (SUI)	1:41.10	

Heat 3

24 Sept. 2004, 09:56

Rank	Athlete	Time	Notes
1	Kurt Fearnley (AUS)	1:37.90	Q
2	Saúl Mendoza (MEX)	1:37.95	Q
3	Rawat Tana (THA)	1:38.34	
4	Alhassane Balde (GER)	1:39.21	
5	Eric Teurnier (FRA)	1:39.65	
6	Huang Zhian (CHN)	1:41.83	
7	Carl Marquis (CAN)	1:41.84	
8	Frederic Periac (AUS)	1:42.32	

=== Final Round ===
25 Sept. 2004, 19:20

Rank	Athlete	Time	Notes
1st place, gold medalist(s)	Choke Yasuoka (JPN)	1:32.45	PR
2nd place, silver medalist(s)	Ernst van Dyk (RSA)	1:32.53	
3rd place, bronze medalist(s)	Marcel Hug (SUI)	1:32.66	
4	Kurt Fearnley (AUS)	1:32.73	
5	Saúl Mendoza (MEX)	1:32.80	
6	Claude Issorat (FRA)	1:32.95	
7	Prawat Wahorum (THA)	1:33.03	
8	Robert Figl (GER)	1:33.03	
