= Athletics at the 2004 Summer Paralympics – Men's marathon T51–54 =

Men's marathon races for wheelchair athletes at the 2004 Summer Paralympics followed the same couse of the Olympics, starting in Marathon and ending at the Panathinaiko Stadium, and started at 08:00 on 26 September. Events were held in three wheelchair disability classes, together with two classes of visually impaired athletes.

== T51 ==
The T51 event was won by Alvise de Vidi, representing Italy.

Rank	Athlete	Time	Notes
1st place, gold medalist(s)	Alvise de Vidi (ITA)	2:53:38	
2nd place, silver medalist(s)	Stefan Strobel (GER)	2:57:50	
3rd place, bronze medalist(s)	Edgar Navarro (MEX)	3:13:42	
4	Thorsten Oppold (GER)	3:27:23	
5	Paolo D'Agostini (ITA)	3:48:28	
6	Mikkel Gaarder (NOR)	3:54:32	
	Dieter Geiling (GER)	DNF	
	Tim Johansson (SWE)	DNF	

== T52 ==
The T52 event was won by Toshihiro Takada, representing Japan.

Rank	Athlete	Time	Notes
1st place, gold medalist(s)	Toshihiro Takada (JPN)	2:00:02	
2nd place, silver medalist(s)	Thomas Geierspichler (AUT)	2:06:10	
3rd place, bronze medalist(s)	Clayton Gerein (CAN)	2:14:26	
4	Tomoya Ito (JPN)	2:20:12	
5	Per Vesterlund (SWE)	2:26:09	
6	Herbert Burns (USA)	2:37:36	
7	Ramon Pla (ESP)	2:58:44	

== T54 ==
The T54 event was won by Kurt Fearnley, representing Australia.

Rank	Athlete	Time	Notes
1st place, gold medalist(s)	Kurt Fearnley (AUS)	1:25:37	
2nd place, silver medalist(s)	Kelly Smith (CAN)	1:29:39	
3rd place, bronze medalist(s)	Tomasz Hamerlak (POL)	1:31:01	
4	Aaron Gordian (MEX)	1:31:03	
5	Joël Jeannot (FRA)	1:31:42	
6	Nobukazu Hanaoka (JPN)	1:31:50	
7	Heinz Frei (SUI)	1:32:04	
8	Jacob Heilveil (USA)	1:33:11	
9	Hiroki Sasahara (JPN)	1:33:55	
10	Masazumi Soejima (JPN)	1:34:59	
11	Alain Fuss (FRA)	1:35:32	
12	Ralph Brunner (GER)	1:35:39	
13	Alan Bergman (CAN)	1:37:40	
14	Denis Lemeunier (FRA)	1:37:41	
15	Krige Schabort (RSA)	1:39:53	
16	Jun Hiromichi (JPN)	1:40:24	
17	Martin Velasco Soria (MEX)	1:41:00	
18	Ernst van Dyk (RSA)	1:41:59	
19	Paul Nunnari (AUS)	1:43:16	
20	Marko Sever (SLO)	1:43:41	
21	Roger Puigbo (ESP)	1:43:50	
22	Robert Figl (GER)	1:45:11	
23	Michel Filteau (CAN)	1:48:17	
24	Scot Hollonbeck (USA)	1:49:16	
25	Gottfried Ferchl (AUT)	1:50:19	
26	Oeivind Sletten (NOR)	1:54:37	
27	Vicente Arzo (ESP)	2:00:50	
28	Tyler Byers (USA)	2:01:09	
29	Omer Cantay (TUR)	2:06:02	
30	Yiannakis Gavriel (CYP)	2:18:22	
31	Yevgeniy Tetyukhin (KAZ)	2:35:45	
32	Sergey Ussoltsev (KAZ)	2:39:54	
	Mohamed Farhat Belkhir (TUN)	DNF	
	William Rivas (ESA)	DNS	
	Choke Yasuoka (JPN)	DNS	
	Franz Nietlispach (SUI)	DNS	
	Adam Bleakney (USA)	DNS	
	Joshua George (USA)	DNS	
