= Japan at the 2008 Summer Paralympics =

- IPC code: JPN
- NPC: Japan Paralympic Committee
- Website: www.jsad.or.jp (in Japanese)

in Beijing
- Competitors: 151 in 17 sports
- Flag bearer: Toru Suzuki
- Medals Ranked 17th: Gold 5 Silver 14 Bronze 8 Total 27

Summer Paralympics appearances (overview)
- 1964; 1968; 1972; 1976; 1980; 1984; 1988; 1992; 1996; 2000; 2004; 2008; 2012; 2016; 2020; 2024

Japan competed at the 2008 Summer Paralympics in Beijing, China. The country's delegation included a women's goalball team, men's and women's sitting volleyball teams, men's and women's wheelchair basketball teams, a wheelchair rugby team, and one wheelchair fencer.

== Medalists ==
Medal	Name	Sport	Event	Date
Gold	Tomoya Ito	Athletics	Men's 400m T52	12 September
Gold	Tomoya Ito	Athletics	Men's 800m T52	16 September
Gold	Masashi Ishii	Cycling	Men's 1 km Time Trial (LC 3–4)	9 September
Gold	Takayuki Suzuki	Swimming	Men's 50m Breaststroke SB3	11 September
Gold	Shingo Kunieda	Wheelchair tennis	Men's Singles	15 September
Silver	Chieko Kamiya	Archery	Women's Individual Compound Open	13 September
Silver	Toshihiro Takada	Athletics	Men's 400m T52	12 September
Silver	Toshihiro Takada	Athletics	Men's 800m T52	16 September
Silver	Hirokazu Ueyonabaru	Athletics	Men's Marathon T52	17 September
Silver	Hiroki Sasahara	Athletics	Men's Marathon T54	17 September
Silver	Atsushi Yamamoto	Athletics	Men's Long Jump F42/44	14 September
Silver	Tomomi Yamaki	Athletics	Women's 100m T52	11 September
Silver	Tomomi Yamaki	Athletics	Women's 200m T52	15 September
Silver	Masaki Fujita	Cycling	Men's Individual Pursuit (LC 3)	9 September
Silver	Masashi Ishii	Cycling	Men's Individual Pursuit (CP 4)	7 September
Silver	Masaki Fujita	Cycling	Men's 1 km Time Trial (LC 3–4)	7 September
Silver	Satoshi Fujimoto	Judo	Men −66 kg	7 September
Silver	Kyosuke Oyama	Swimming	Men's 50m Butterfly S6	13 September
Silver	Junichi Kawai	Swimming	Men's 50m Freestyle S11	14 September
Bronze	Toshihiro Takada	Athletics	Men's Marathon T52	17 September
Bronze	Toshie Oi	Athletics	Men's Discus Throw F53/54	14 September
Bronze	Teruyo Tanaka	Athletics	Women's 100m T52	15 September
Bronze	Masaki Fujita	Cycling	Men's Individual Time Trial LC3	12 September
Bronze	Masashi Ishii	Cycling	Men's Individual Time Trial CP 4	12 September
Bronze	Junichi Kawai	Swimming	Men's 100m Butterfly S11	9 September
Bronze	Takayuki Suzuki	Swimming	Men's 150m Individual Medley SM4	14 September
Bronze	Shingo Kunieda; Satoshi Saida	Wheelchair tennis	Men's Doubles Open	14 September

== Sports ==
=== Archery ===
==== Men ====
Athlete	Event	Ranking round		Round of 32	Round of 16	Quarterfinals	Semifinals	Finals	
Athlete	Event	Score	Seed	Opposition score	Opposition score	Opposition score	Opposition score	Opposition score	Rank
Akira Haraguchi	Men's individual recurve standing	557	20	Meunier (FRA); L 83–109	did not advance				
Takahiro Hasegawa	Men's individual recurve standing	611	7	Bye	Lyocsa (SVK); L 94–100	did not advance			
Kimimasa Onodera	Men's individual recurve standing	620	5	Bye	Inkaew (THA); L 96–100	did not advance			
Tsunehiko Naganuma	Men's individual recurve W1/W2	576	20	Gilbert (FRA); L 80–93	did not advance				
Nobuji Yoshida	Men's individual recurve W1/W2	560	22	Oehme (GER); W 89–74	Tseng L H (TPE); L 98–106	did not advance			
Takahiro Hasegawa; Tsunehiko Naganuma; Kimimasa Onodera	Men's team recurve	1807	4	—N/a		Spain (ESP); W 188–183	South Korea (KOR); L 188–201	Italy (ITA); L 194–207	4

==== Women ====
Athlete	Event	Ranking round		Round of 32	Round of 16	Quarterfinals	Semifinals	Finals	
Athlete	Event	Score	Seed	Opposition score	Opposition score	Opposition score	Opposition score	Opposition score	Rank
Chieko Kamiya	Women's individual compound open	627	7	—N/a		Reppe (SWE); W 107–106	Su (TUR); W 106–104	Brown (GBR); L 98–112	2nd place, silver medalist(s)
Kimiko Konishi	Women's individual recurve standing	536	12	—N/a	Salden-Otten (NED); L 90–93	did not advance			
Yae Yamakawa	Women's individual recurve standing	561	8	—N/a	Kim K H (KOR); L 79–85	did not advance			
Aya Nakanishi	Women's individual recurve W1/W2	447	19	Ozturk (TUR); W 82–78	Sidkova (CZE); W 82–74	Maufras du Chatellier (FRA); W 90–84	Fu H (CHN); L 76–82	Xiao Y (CHN); L 94–98	4
Ayako Saitoh	Women's individual recurve W1/W2	543	9	Bye	Murray (GBR); W 86–76	Xiao Y (CHN); L 90–96	did not advance		
Kimiko Konishi; Ayako Saitoh; Yae Yamakawa	Women's team recurve	1640	3	—N/a		Czech Republic (CZE); L 167–174	did not advance		

=== Athletics ===
==== Men's track ====
Athlete	Class	Event	Heats		Semifinal		Final	
Athlete	Class	Event	Result	Rank	Result	Rank	Result	Rank
Jun Hiromichi	T53	400m	52.78	7 q	—N/a		51.54	8
Jun Hiromichi	T53	800m	1:40.38	7 Q	—N/a		1:37.86	8
Jun Hiromichi	T54	5000m	10:52.28	20	did not advance			
Kota Hokinoue	T54	5000m	10:14.55	3 Q	—N/a		10:23.70	5
Kota Hokinoue	T54	Marathon	—N/a				1:23:22	5
Tadashi Horikoshi	T13	1500m	4:11.36	11	did not advance			
Tadashi Horikoshi	T13	5000m	16:27.36	12	did not advance			
Tomoya Ito	T52	400m	59.21	1 Q	—N/a		57.25 PR	1st place, gold medalist(s)
Tomoya Ito	T52	800m	1:52.31 WR	1 Q	—N/a		1:53.42	1st place, gold medalist(s)
Hirokai Kajisa	T12	Marathon	—N/a				2:56:31	21
Susumu Kangawa	T53	400m	54.67	15	did not advance			
Susumu Kangawa	T53	800m	1:46.65	16	did not advance			
Kenji Kotani	T54	400m	50.32	18	did not advance			
Kenji Kotani	T54	800m	DNF q		1:35.83	10	did not advance	
Hitoshi Matsunaga	T53	400m	55.38	16	did not advance			
Hitoshi Matsunaga	T53	800m	1:42.55	13	did not advance			
Yoshifumi Nagao	T54	200m	26.14	11	did not advance			
Yoshifumi Nagao	T54	400m	49.75	12 Q	51.66	10	did not advance	
Masahito Niino	T12	Marathon	—N/a				2:51:14	21
Naohiro Ninomiya	T46	1500m	4:16.79	22	did not advance			
Naohiro Ninomiya	T46	5000m	—N/a				15:35.44	10
Hiroki Sasahara	T54	800m	1:37.42	5 Q	1:41.28	17	did not advance	
Hiroki Sasahara	T54	Marathon	—N/a				1:23:17	2nd place, silver medalist(s)
Masazumi Soejima	T54	1500m	3:14.17	18 Q	3:10.69	19	did not advance	
Masazumi Soejima	T54	5000m	10:22.43	11	did not advance			
Masazumi Soejima	T54	Marathon	—N/a				1:23:55	12
Tomoki Tagawa	T46	100m	11.39	12	did not advance			
Tomoki Tagawa	T46	200m	23.38	12	did not advance			
Koichi Takada	T11	100m	12.16	21	did not advance			
Toshihiro Takada	T52	400m	1:02.91	7 q	—N/a		1:00.32	2nd place, silver medalist(s)
Toshihiro Takada	T52	800m	1:58.91	2 Q	—N/a		1:53.67	2nd place, silver medalist(s)
Toshihiro Takada	T52	Marathon	—N/a				1:40:20	3rd place, bronze medalist(s)
Yuichi Takahashi	T12	Marathon	—N/a				2:43:38	16
Hirokazu Ueyonabaru	T52	200m	—N/a				32.46	6
Hirokazu Ueyonabaru	T52	400m	1:01.11	4 Q	—N/a		1:02.67	6
Hirokazu Ueyonabaru	T52	800m	2:00.84	6 Q	—N/a		2:00.65	4
Hirokazu Ueyonabaru	T52	Marathon	—N/a				1:40:10	2nd place, silver medalist(s)
Atsushi Yamamoto	T42	100m	—N/a				13.68	5
Hiroyuki Yamamoto	T54	1500m	3:15.92	21 q	3:10.37	16	did not advance	
Hiroyuki Yamamoto	T54	Marathon	—N/a				1:23:22	6
Choke Yasuoka	T54	200m	26.57	18	did not advance			
Choke Yasuoka	T54	400m	50.24	17	did not advance			
Choke Yasuoka	T54	800m	1:36.51	2 Q	1:40.39	13	did not advance	
Choke Yasuoka	T54	1500m	3:17.28	23 Q	3:10.53	18	did not advance	
Choke Yasuoka	T54	Marathon	—N/a				1:24:04	13
Naohiro Ninomiya; Toru Suzuki; Tomoki Tagawa; Atsushi Yamamoto	T42-46	4x100m relay	—N/a				DSQ	
Susumu Kangawa; Kenji Kotani; Yoshifumi Nagao; Hitoshi Matsunaga	T53-54	4x400m relay	3:23.17	7	did not advance			

==== Men's field ====
Athlete	Class	Event	Final		
Athlete	Class	Event	Result	Points	Rank
Toshie Oi	F53-54	Discus throw	26.21	1032	3rd place, bronze medalist(s)
Mineho Ozaki	F11-12	Javelin throw	44.46	908	6
Toru Suzuki	F44/46	High jump	1.93	965	5
Koichi Takada	F11	Long jump	5.74	-	5
Atsushi Yamamoto	F42/44	Long jump	5.84	989	2nd place, silver medalist(s)

==== Women's track ====
Athlete	Class	Event	Heats		Final	
Athlete	Class	Event	Result	Rank	Result	Rank
Yuki Kato	T36	100m	—N/a		15.42	4
Yuki Kato	T36	200m	—N/a		33.53	5
Maya Nakanishi	T44	100m	13.93	5 q	14.24	6
Maya Nakanishi	T44	200m	—N/a		28.98	4
Uran Sawada	T13	100m	14.18	16	did not advance	
Teruyo Tanaka	T52	100m	—N/a		21.33	3rd place, bronze medalist(s)
Teruyo Tanaka	T52	200m	—N/a		40.36	4
Tomomi Yamaki	T52	100m	—N/a		21.00	2nd place, silver medalist(s)
Tomomi Yamaki	T52	200m	—N/a		37.44	2nd place, silver medalist(s)

==== Women's field ====
Athlete	Class	Event	Final		
Athlete	Class	Event	Result	Points	Rank
Mariko Fujita	F35-36	Discus throw	15.51	721	9
Mariko Fujita	F35-36	Shot put	6.62	744	9
Uran Sawada	F13	Long jump	4.93	-	9

=== Boccia ===
Athlete	Event	Preliminaries			Quarterfinals	Semifinals	Final	
Athlete	Event	Opponent	Opposition Score	Rank	Opposition Score	Opposition Score	Opposition Score	Rank
Takayuki Kitani	Mixed individual BC1	Shelly (IRL)	L 2–5	5	did not advance			
Takayuki Kitani	Mixed individual BC1	Park J S (KOR)	L 4–8	5	did not advance			
Takayuki Kitani	Mixed individual BC1	Richardson (CAN)	W 4–3	5	did not advance			
Takayuki Kitani	Mixed individual BC1	Ibarbure (ARG)	L 2–6	5	did not advance			
Takayuki Hirose	Mixed individual BC2	Murray (GBR)	L 0–10	2	did not advance			
Takayuki Hirose	Mixed individual BC2	Loung (HKG)	W 4–3	2	did not advance			
Takayuki Hirose	Mixed individual BC2	Bonner (NZL)	W 8–1	2	did not advance			
Risa Kainuma	Mixed individual BC2	F Ferreira (POR)	L 2–8	3	did not advance			
Risa Kainuma	Mixed individual BC2	Bentley (GBR)	L 2–5	3	did not advance			
Risa Kainuma	Mixed individual BC2	Leahy (IRL)	W 4–2	3	did not advance			
Keizo Uchida	Mixed individual BC2	Dukovich (CAN)	W 5–4	1 Q	Martin (ESP); L 1–3	did not advance		
Keizo Uchida	Mixed individual BC2	Ollikka (FIN)	W 6–0	1 Q	Martin (ESP); L 1–3	did not advance		
Keizo Uchida	Mixed individual BC2	Robinson (GBR)	W 6–2	1 Q	Martin (ESP); L 1–3	did not advance		
Takayuki Hirose; Risa Kainuma; Takayuki Kitani; Keizo Uchida	Mixed team BC1-2	Portugal (POR)	L 4–7	3	did not advance			
Takayuki Hirose; Risa Kainuma; Takayuki Kitani; Keizo Uchida	Mixed team BC1-2	Norway (NOR)	L 4–7	3	did not advance			

=== Cycling ===
==== Men's road ====
Athlete	Event	Time	Rank
Masaki Fujita	Men's road race LC3/LC4/CP3	1:41:03	19
Masaki Fujita	Men's road time trial LC3	38:38.96	3rd place, bronze medalist(s)
Masashi Ishii	Men's road race LC1/LC2/CP4	DNF	
Masashi Ishii	Men's road time trial CP4	36:10.20	3rd place, bronze medalist(s)
Mutsuhiko Ogawa	Mixed road race	49:47	4
Mutsuhiko Ogawa	Mixed road time trial	25:35.80	8
Tatsuyuki Oshiro; Hitoshi Takahashi (pilot)	Men's road race B&VI 1–3	2:29:18	13
Tatsuyuki Oshiro; Hitoshi Takahashi (pilot)	Men's road time trial B&VI 1–3	35:10.00	14

==== Men's track ====
Athlete	Event	Qualification		Quarterfinals		Semifinals		Final	
Athlete	Event	Time	Rank	Time	Rank	Time	Rank	Opposition Time	Rank
Masaki Fujita	Men's individual pursuit LC3	3:52.25	2 Q	—N/a				Richardson (GBR); L 3:59.02	2nd place, silver medalist(s)
Masaki Fujita	Men's time trial LC3-4	—N/a						1:17.314	2nd place, silver medalist(s)
Masashi Ishii	Men's individual pursuit CP4	3:37.848	1 Q	—N/a				Scott (AUS); L 3:40.157	2nd place, silver medalist(s)
Masashi Ishii	Men's time trial CP4	—N/a						1:08.77 WR	1st place, gold medalist(s)
Tatsuyuki Oshiro; Hitoshi Takahashi	Men's sprint B&VI 1–3	10.482	4 Q	Cowie (CAN); Smibert (CAN); W 12.168; W 12.431	Q	Kappes (GBR); Storey (GBR); L 0–2	q	Kilpatrick (RSA); Thomson (RSA); L 1–2	4
Tatsuyuki Oshiro; Hitoshi Takahashi	Men's time trial B&VI 1–3	—N/a						1:04.593	5

=== Equestrian ===
Athlete	Horse	Event	Total	
Athlete	Horse	Event	Score	Rank
Yutaka Shibuya	Elegance	Mixed individual championship test grade III	48.320	12
Yutaka Shibuya	Elegance	Mixed individual freestyle test grade III	48.728	12

=== Goalball ===
The women's goalball team didn't win any medals; they were in seventh place in the preliminary stage.

==== Players ====
- Akiko Adachi
- Mieko Kato
- Masae Komiya
- Yuki Naoi
- Tomoe Takada
- Rie Urata

==== Tournament ====
7 September 2008

United States	2–0	Japan

Beijing Institute of Technology Gymnasium
8 September 2008

Japan	1–4	Sweden

Beijing Institute of Technology Gymnasium
9 September 2008

Canada	3–0	Japan

Beijing Institute of Technology Gymnasium
10 September 2008

Japan	1–2	Denmark

Beijing Institute of Technology Gymnasium
11 September 2008

China	3–1	Japan

Beijing Institute of Technology Gymnasium
12 September 2008

Japan	3–1	Brazil

Beijing Institute of Technology Gymnasium
13 September 2008

Germany	1–2	Japan

Beijing Institute of Technology Gymnasium

=== Judo ===
==== Men ====
Athlete	Event	First Round	Quarterfinals	Semifinals	Repechage round 1	Repechage round 2	Final/ Bronze medal contest
Athlete	Event	Opposition Result	Opposition Result	Opposition Result	Opposition Result	Opposition Result	Opposition Result
Satoshi Fujimoto	Men's 66kg	Bye	Kallunki (FIN); W 0101-0000	V Sanchez (CUB); H	—N/a		Lamri (ALG); L 0000-0100 (silver)
Yusuke Hatsuse	Men's 90kg	Bye	Cugnon de Servicourt (FRA); L 0001-0010	—N/a	Ingram (GBR); L 0000-1000	did not advance	
Haruka Hirose	Men's 100kg	Rose (GBR); W 0002-0001	Sardarov (AZE); L 0001-1001	—N/a	Bye	Rollo (FRA); W 0100-0010	Lyivytskyi (UKR); L 0001-0100
Makoto Hirose	Men's 60kg	Castellanos (COL); W 1010-0000	Noura (ALG); L 0001–1000	—N/a	Bye	Shakhmanov (RUS); L 0101-1000	Did not advance
Takayuki Kimura	Men's 73kg	Aliyev (AZE); L 0000-1001	did not advance				
Kenji Oga	Men's 81kg	Jones (USA); W 0210-0001	Cruz (CUB); L 0000-0010	—N/a	Bye	Novruzzade (AZE); FG	Carvallo (VEN); L 0000-1010

==== Women ====
Athlete	Event	First Round	Quarterfinals	Semifinals	Repechage	Final/ Bronze medal contest
Athlete	Event	Opposition Result	Opposition Result	Opposition Result	Opposition Result	Opposition Result
Masami Akatsuka	Women's 48kg	M Gonzalez (CUB); L 0000–1000	—N/a		Medjeded (FRA); L 0000-0200	Did not advance
Rikei Komatsu	Women's +70kg	—N/a	Manzuoli (FRA); L 0010-1011	De Silva (BRA); L 0000-1011	—N/a	Kalyanova (RUS); L 0000-0201
Minako Tsuchiya	Women's 52kg	—N/a	M Ferreira (BRA); L 0000-1010	—N/a	Bye	Stepanyuk (RUS); L 0000-0200

=== Powerlifting ===
==== Men ====
Athlete	Event	Result	Rank
Hideki Odo	75kg	187.5	8

=== Rowing ===
Athlete	Event	Heats		Repechage		Final	
Athlete	Event	Time	Rank	Time	Rank	Time	Rank
Miho Hamada; Megumi Matsumoto	Mixed double sculls	4:52.96	12 R	5:09.86	9 FB	5:01.30	6

=== Shooting ===
==== Men ====
Athlete	Event	Qualification		Final		
Athlete	Event	Score	Rank	Score	Total	Rank
Kiyoto Matayoshi	Men's 10m air rifle standing SH1	575	20	did not advance		
Kiyoto Matayoshi	Men's 50m rifle 3 positions SH1	1135	10	did not advance		
Kiyoto Matayoshi	Mixed 10m air rifle prone SH1	596	20	did not advance		
Kiyoto Matayoshi	Mixed 50m rifle prone SH1	579	28	did not advance		
Kenji Ohashi	Men's 10m air pistol SH1	555	21	did not advance		
Kenji Ohashi	Mixed 50m pistol SH1	519	13	did not advance		
Aki Taguchi	Mixed 10m air rifle prone SH1	599	5 Q	103.0	702.0	8
Aki Taguchi	Mixed 50m rifle prone SH1	583	18	did not advance		

==== Women ====
Athlete	Event	Qualification		Final		
Athlete	Event	Score	Rank	Score	Total	Rank
Yukiko Kinoshita	Mixed 10m air rifle prone SH2	585	23	did not advance		
Yukiko Kinoshita	Mixed 10m air rifle standing SH2	575	22	did not advance		
Izumi Takehi	Women's 10 metre air rifle standing SH1	375	20	did not advance		
Izumi Takehi	Women's 50 metre rifle 3 positions SH1	545	13	did not advance		
Izumi Takehi	Mixed 10m air rifle prone SH1	594	34	did not advance		

=== Swimming ===
==== Men ====
Athlete	Class	Event	Heats		Final	
Athlete	Class	Event	Result	Rank	Result	Rank
Daisuke Ejima	S7	100m backstroke	1:17.12	5 Q	1:16.42	5
Daisuke Ejima	S7	50m butterfly	33.12	4 Q	33.69	4
Daisuke Ejima	SM7	200m individual medley	2:58.38	9	did not advance	
Junichi Kawai	S11	100m backstroke	1:13.17	5 Q	1:09.46	4
Junichi Kawai	S11	100m butterfly	1:05.89	2 Q	1:05.79	3rd place, bronze medalist(s)
Junichi Kawai	S11	50m freestyle	27.43	3 Q	27.16	2nd place, silver medalist(s)
Jumpei Kimura	S7	100m freestyle	1:13.34	13	did not advance	
Jumpei Kimura	S7	400m freestyle	5:29.67	8 Q	5:28.10	8
Jumpei Kimura	SB6	100m breaststroke	1:34.62	4 Q	1:35.88	5
Jumpei Kimura	SM7	200m individual medley	2:56.73	7 Q	2:55.03	7
Keiichi Kimura	S11	100m butterfly	1:10.11	6 Q	1:09.39	6
Keiichi Kimura	S11	50m freestyle	28.35	9	did not advance	
Keiichi Kimura	S11	100m freestyle	1:03.84	6 Q	1:02.72	5
Keiichi Kimura	S11	400m freestyle	5:15.04	9	did not advance	
Keiichi Kimura	SB11	100m breaststroke	1:18.27	5 Q	1:17.25	5
Tomotaro Nakamura	SB7	100m breaststroke	1:25.16	3 Q	1:25.34	5
Kyosuke Oyama	S6	50m butterfly	32.59	2 Q	31.01	2nd place, silver medalist(s)
Kyosuke Oyama	S6	50m freestyle	32.87	7 Q	31.37	5
Kyosuke Oyama	S6	100m freestyle	1:12.25	7 Q	1:12.24	7
Kyosuke Oyama	S6	400m freestyle	5:38.86	8 Q	5:28.38	7
Takayuki Suzuki	S5	50m freestyle	39.35	10	did not advance	
Takayuki Suzuki	S5	100m freestyle	1:25.51	7 Q	1:25.29	7
Takayuki Suzuki	S5	200m freestyle	—N/a		3:02.80	8
Takayuki Suzuki	SB3	50m breaststroke	48.49 WR	1 Q	49.06	1st place, gold medalist(s)
Takayuki Suzuki	SM4	150m individual medley	2:44.91	2 Q	2:41.11	3rd place, bronze medalist(s)
Takuro Yamada	S9	50m freestyle	27.04	10	did not advance	
Takuro Yamada	S9	100m freestyle	57.82	5 Q	57.29	5
Takuro Yamada	S9	400m freestyle	4:28.98	7 Q	4:25.78	6
Takuro Yamada	SB8	100m breaststroke	1:17.76	6 Q	1:18.40	7
Takuro Yamada	SM9	200m individual medley	2:25.44	4 Q	2:24.20	5

==== Women ====
Athlete	Class	Event	Heats		Final	
Athlete	Class	Event	Result	Rank	Result	Rank
Rina Akiyama	S11	50m freestyle	33.77	7 Q	33.88	8
Rina Akiyama	S11	100m freestyle	1:20.57	12	did not advance	
Naomi Ikinaga	S11	50m freestyle	33.38	6 Q	32.81	5
Naomi Ikinaga	S11	100m freestyle	1:16.64	9	did not advance	
Noriko Kajiwara	SB4	100m breaststroke	2:04.22	4 Q	2:04.22	5
Akari Kasamoto	S13	100m backstroke	1:14.43	6 Q	1:14.85	7
Akari Kasamoto	S13	100m butterfly	1:27.63	9	did not advance	
Akari Kasamoto	SM13	200m individual medley	—N/a		2:55.16	8
Yuka Kawamura	S5	50m backstroke	55.01	7 Q	55.41	8
Yuka Kawamura	S5	50m freestyle	46.56	12	did not advance	
Yuka Kawamura	S5	100m freestyle	1:35.82	7 Q	1:35.72	7
Yuka Kawamura	S5	200m freestyle	3:22.29	5 Q	3:24.31	6
Yuri Kitamura	SB5	100m breaststroke	2:02.68	7 Q	2:03.41	7
Erika Nara	S6	50m freestyle	37.46	2 Q	38.32	6
Erika Nara	S6	100m freestyle	1:25.17	7 Q	1:21.81	6
Erika Nara	S6	400m freestyle	6:31.92	8 Q	6:26.60	8
Mayumi Narita	S5	50m backstroke	51.85	6 Q	51.23	5
Mayumi Narita	S5	50m freestyle	39.96	5 Q	39.99	5
Mayumi Narita	S5	100m freestyle	1:27.53	5 Q	1:27.90	5
Manami Nomura	S8	100m butterfly	1:21.94	8 Q	1:20.64	8
Manami Nomura	SB8	100m breaststroke	1:27.15	4 Q	1:25.87	4
Manami Nomura	SM8	200m individual medley	3:03.25	9	did not advance	
Sugako Takeuchi	S5	50m freestyle	43.72	6 Q	44.04	6
Sugako Takeuchi	S5	100m freestyle	1:39.92	8 Q	1:38.21	8
Sugako Takeuchi	S5	200m freestyle	3:40.02	11	did not advance	

=== Table tennis ===
Athlete	Event	Preliminaries				Quarterfinals	Semifinals	Final / BM	
Athlete	Event	Opposition Result	Opposition Result	Opposition Result	Rank	Opposition Result	Opposition Result	Opposition Result	Rank
Toshihiko Oka	Men's singles C4-5	Martin (FRA); L 0–3	Kwong K S (HKG); W 3–0	—N/a	2	did not advance			
Kimie Bessho	Women's singles C5	Abuawad (JOR); L 2–3	Nardelli (ITA); W 3–0	Nir Kistler (USA); W 3–1	2	did not advance			

=== Volleyball ===
==== Men's tournament ====
The men's volleyball team didn't win any medals; they were 8th out of 8 teams.

Players

- Shun Azuma
- Satoshi Kanao
- Susumu Kaneda
- Tetsuo Minakawa
- Kaname Nakayama
- Susumu Takasago
- Yoshihito Takeda
- Tsutomu Tanabe
- Koji Tanaka
- Arata Yamamoto
- Atsushi Yonezawa
- Hitoshi Yoshida

Results

7 September 2008; 11:30	Japan (JPN)	0–3	Iran (IRI)	China Agricultural University Gymnasium; Attendance: 1,350; Referees: Matijn Meulenkamp (Netherlands)
7 September 2008; 11:30	(7–25, 7–25, 5–25)			China Agricultural University Gymnasium; Attendance: 1,350; Referees: Matijn Meulenkamp (Netherlands)

9 September 2008; 19:30	Brazil (BRA)	3–0	Japan (JPN)	China Agricultural University Gymnasium; Attendance: 1,000; Referees: An Qi (China)
9 September 2008; 19:30	(25–20, 25–17, 25–10)			China Agricultural University Gymnasium; Attendance: 1,000; Referees: An Qi (China)

10 September 2008; 15:30	Japan (JPN)	0–3	Egypt (EGY)	China Agricultural University Gymnasium; Attendance: 600; Referees: Xia Xin (China)
10 September 2008; 15:30	(8–25, 11–25, 15–25)			China Agricultural University Gymnasium; Attendance: 600; Referees: Xia Xin (China)

5–8th Semifinals

13 September 2008	China (CHN)	3–0	Japan (JPN)	China Agricultural University Gymnasium
13 September 2008	(25–16, 25–20, 25–19)			China Agricultural University Gymnasium

7–8th Classification

14 September 2008	Japan (JPN)	0–3	Iraq (IRQ)	China Agricultural University Gymnasium
14 September 2008	(15–25, 15–25, 14–25)			China Agricultural University Gymnasium

==== Women's tournament ====
The women's volleyball team didn't win any medals; they were 8th out of 8 teams.

Players

- Sachie Awano
- Junko Fujii
- Noriko Kaneda
- Emi Kaneki
- Yukari Okahira
- Shiori Omura
- Mamiko Osada
- Yoko Saito
- Haruni Sakamoto
- Tomoko Sakamoto
- Kiyoko Tomiya

Results

7 September 2008; 13:30	Netherlands (NED)	3–0	Japan (JPN)	China Agricultural University Gymnasium
7 September 2008; 13:30	(25–4, 25–21, 25–18)			China Agricultural University Gymnasium

8 September 2008; 9:00	Japan (JPN)	1–3	Slovenia (SLO)	China Agricultural University Gymnasium
8 September 2008; 9:00	(19–25, 25–21, 19–25, 9–25)			China Agricultural University Gymnasium

10 September 2008; 12:00	Ukraine (UKR)	3–0	Japan (JPN)	China Agricultural University Gymnasium
10 September 2008; 12:00	(25–16, 25–14, 25–18)			China Agricultural University Gymnasium

5–8th Semifinals

12 September 2008; 17:30	Japan (JPN)	1–3	Lithuania (LTU)	China Agricultural University Gymnasium
12 September 2008; 17:30	(17–25, 25–20, 18–25, 19–25)			China Agricultural University Gymnasium

7th–8th Classification

13 September 2008; 20:00	Latvia (LAT)	3–2	Japan (JPN)	China Agricultural University Gymnasium
13 September 2008; 20:00	(25–19, 20–25, 25–18, 19–25, 25–16)			China Agricultural University Gymnasium

=== Wheelchair basketball ===
==== Men's tournament ====
The men's basketball team didn't win any medals; they were 7th out of 12 teams.

Players

- Shingo Fujii
- Reo Fujimoto
- Keisuke Koretomo
- Hiroaki Kozai
- Kazuyuki Kyoya
- Kenzo Maeda
- Fumiharu Miura
- Tetsuya Miyajima
- Noriyuki Mori
- Tomohiko Oshima
- Satoshi Sato
- Akimasa Suzuki

Results

7 September 2008
11:15

Sweden	61–49	Japan
Scoring by quarter: 16 – 6, 17 – 9, 12 – 19, 16 – 15

National Indoor Stadium, Beijing
Attendance: 12,000
Referees: Sebastien Gauthier (Canada)

8 September 2008
18:30

Japan	58–56	Germany
Scoring by quarter: 18 – 12, 14 – 17, 14–14, 12 – 13

National Indoor Stadium, Beijing
Attendance: 8,580
Referees: Sergio Giordano (Canada)

9 September 2008
10:00

Iran	69–50	Japan
Scoring by quarter: 9 – 6, 18 – 15, 17 – 14, 25 – 15

National Indoor Stadium, Beijing
Attendance: 1,095
Referees: Ian Robert Pursglove (Great Britain)

10 September 2008
9:00

Japan	48–75	Canada
Scoring by quarter: 7 – 18, 18 – 19, 5 – 21, 18 – 17

National Indoor Stadium, Beijing
Attendance: 7,262
Referees: Seppo Olavi Viljanen (Czech Republic)

11 September 2008
12:15

South Africa	58–60	Japan
Scoring by quarter: 17 – 15, 10 – 11, 16 – 14, 15 – 20

National Indoor Stadium, Beijing
Attendance: 1,302
Referees: Bill Kuerzi (United States)

Quarterfinals

13 September 2008
13:30

Japan	52–72	Australia
Scoring by quarter: 15 – 21, 15 – 17, 13 – 19, 9 – 15

National Indoor Stadium, Beijing
Attendance: 12,000
Referees: Edwin Frank Wallaart (Netherlands)

5–8th Classification

15 September 2008
11:15

Germany	71–57	Japan
Scoring by quarter: 16–16, 21 – 11, 12 – 16, 22 – 14

National Indoor Stadium, Beijing
Attendance: 12,000
Referees: Bill Kuerzi (United States

7th–8th Classification

16 September 2008

Iran DNS

Japan	20–0	Iran

National Indoor Stadium, Beijing

==== Women's tournament ====
The women's basketball team didn't win any medals; they were defeated by Australia in the bronze medal match.

Players

- Mari Amimoto
- Yuka Betto
- Rie Kawakami
- Tomomi Kosuzuki
- Megumi Mashiko
- Naoko Sugahara
- Tomoe Soeda
- Mika Takabayashi
- Ikumi Takudo
- Kimi Taneda
- Miki Uramoto
- Erika Yoshida

Tournament

7 September 2008
17:45

Japan	49–46	China

USTB Gymnasium, Beijing

8 September 2008
9:00

Mexico	34–52	Japan

National Indoor Stadium, Beijing

9 September 2008
16:15

Japan	55–52	Canada

National Indoor Stadium, Beijing

10 September 2008
10:00

Netherlands	49–65	Japan

USTB Gymnasium, Beijing

Quarterfinals

12 September 2008
16:45

Japan	45–38	Great Britain
Scoring by quarter: 9 – 10, 5 – 10, 12 – 6, 19 – 12

National Indoor Stadium, Beijing
Attendance: 12,215
Referees: Matthew Brian Wells (Australia)

Semifinals

13 September 2008
19:00

Germany	60–40	Japan
Scoring by quarter: 14 – 12, 12 – 10, 8 – 12, 26 – 6

National Indoor Stadium, Beijing
Attendance: 12,000
Referees: Rui David Marques (Brazil)

Bronze medal game

15 September 2008
19:00

Japan	47–53	Australia
Scoring by quarter: 10 – 17, 13 – 14, 13 – 12, 11 – 10

National Indoor Stadium, Beijing
Attendance: 12,000
Referees: Rui David Marques (Brazil)

=== Wheelchair fencing ===
Athlete	Event	Qualification			Round of 16	Quarterfinal	Semifinal	Final / BM	
Athlete	Event	Opposition	Score	Rank	Opposition Score	Opposition Score	Opposition Score	Opposition Score	Rank
Toyoaki Hisakawa	Men's épée B	Cratere (FRA)	L 1–5	6	did not advance				
Toyoaki Hisakawa	Men's épée B	Rodgers (USA)	L 1–5	6	did not advance				
Toyoaki Hisakawa	Men's épée B	Mainville (CAN)	L 3–5	6	did not advance				
Toyoaki Hisakawa	Men's épée B	Hu D (CHN)	L 0–5	6	did not advance				
Toyoaki Hisakawa	Men's épée B	Soler (ESP)	L 1–5	6	did not advance				
Toyoaki Hisakawa	Men's foil B	Sarri (ITA)	L 3–5	4 Q	Szekeres (HUN); L 6–15	did not advance			
Toyoaki Hisakawa	Men's foil B	Latreche (FRA)	L 3–5	4 Q	Szekeres (HUN); L 6–15	did not advance			
Toyoaki Hisakawa	Men's foil B	Wyganowski (POL)	W 5–4	4 Q	Szekeres (HUN); L 6–15	did not advance			
Toyoaki Hisakawa	Men's foil B	Yusupov (RUS)	L 2–5	4 Q	Szekeres (HUN); L 6–15	did not advance			
Toyoaki Hisakawa	Men's foil B	Bezyazychny (BLR)	W 5–4	4 Q	Szekeres (HUN); L 6–15	did not advance			

=== Wheelchair rugby ===
Squad list	Group stage				Knockout stage		
Squad list	Pool Match 1 Opposition Result	Pool Match 2 Opposition Result	Pool Match 3 Opposition Result	Rank	Semifinal Opposition Result	Final Opposition Result	Rank
Shingo Fujishima; Shunsuke Kawano; Hiroyuki Misaka; Takuo Murohashi; Yu Nagayasu; Shin Nakazato; Koichi Ogino (captain); Yoshito Sato; Shinichi Shimakawa; Yoshinobu Takahashi; Manabu Tamura	United States; L 37–44	Canada; L 50–58	China; W 55–38	3	Classification 5–8; Germany; L 38–39	Classification 7/8th China; W 58–32	7

=== Wheelchair tennis ===
==== Men ====
Athlete	Class	Event	Round of 64	Round of 32	Round of 16	Quarterfinals	Semifinals	Finals
Athlete	Class	Event	Opposition Result	Opposition Result	Opposition Result	Opposition Result	Opposition Result	Opposition Result
Yoshinobu Fujimoto	Open	Men's singles	Weekes (AUS); W 7–5, 6–4	Pellegrina (SUI); W 6–4, 3–6, 6–4	Scheffers (NED); L 1–6, 1–6	did not advance		
Toshio Ikenoya	Open	Men's singles	Legner (AUT); L 1–6, 0–6	did not advance				
Shingo Kunieda	Open	Men's singles	Jewitt (GBR); W 6–1, 6–0	Stuurman (NED); W 6–2, 6–1	Rydberg (USA); W 6–1, 6–1	Olsson (SWE); W 6–0, 6–1	Scheffers (NED); W 6–1, 6–1	Ammerlaan (NED); W 6–3, 6–0 (gold)
Satoshi Saida	Open	Men's singles	Camusso (ARG); W 6–0, 6–0	C Santos (BRA); W 6–0, 6–1	Kruszelnicki (POL); W 6–2, 6–3	Ammerlaan (NED); L 4–6, 2–6	did not advance	
Yoshinobu Fujimoto; Toshio Ikenoya	Open	Men's doubles	—N/a	Pommê (BRA) / C Santos (BRA); W 6–2, 5–7, 6–1	Houdet (FRA) / Jeremiasz (FRA); L 2–6, 2–6	did not advance		
Shingo Kunieda; Satoshi Saida	Open	Men's doubles	—N/a	Bye	Illobre (ESP) / Tur (ESP); W 6–1, 6–1	Legner (AUT) / Mossier (AUT); W 6–2, 6–1	Olsson (SWE) / Wikstrom (SWE); L 6–7, 6–3, 2–6	Scheffers (NED) / Vink (NED); W 3–6, 6–0, 6–2 (bronze)

==== Women ====
Athlete	Class	Event	Round of 32	Round of 16	Quarterfinals	Semifinals	Finals
Athlete	Class	Event	Opposition Result	Opposition Result	Opposition Result	Opposition Result	Opposition Result
Kanako Domori	Open	Women's singles	Shuker (GBR); L 1–6, 3–6	did not advance			
Chiyoko Ohmae	Open	Women's singles	Fridman (ISR); L 4–6, 0–6	did not advance			
Mie Yaosa	Open	Women's singles	Dong (CHN); L 4–6, 4–6	did not advance			
Yuko Okabe	Open	Women's singles	Griffioen (NED); L 2–6, 4–6	did not advance			
Kanako Domori; Chiyoko Ohmae	Open	Women's doubles	—N/a	Bye	Gravellier (FRA) / Racineux (FRA); L 4–6, 5–7	did not advance	
Yuko Okabe; Mie Yaosa	Open	Women's doubles	—N/a	di Maria (ITA) / Lauro (ITA); W 6–4, 6–0	Griffioen (NED) / Vergeer (NED); L 1–6, 2–6	did not advance	

==== Quads ====
Athlete	Class	Event	Round of 16	Quarterfinals	Semifinals	Finals
Athlete	Class	Event	Opposition Result	Opposition Result	Opposition Result	Opposition Result
Sadahiro Kimura	Open	Quads' singles	Jansson (SWE); W 6–0, 6–7, 6–3	Norfolk (GBR); L 0–6, 1–6	did not advance	

== See also ==
- Japan at the Paralympics
- Japan at the 2008 Summer Olympics
