= Athletics at the 2004 Summer Paralympics – Men's 200 metres T51–54 =

Men's 200m races for wheelchair athletes at the 2004 Summer Paralympics were held in the Athens Olympic Stadium. Events were held in four disability classes.

== T51 ==
Men's 200m T51 at the XII Paralympic Games
- Venue: Athens Olympic Stadium
- Dates: 25 September 2004
- Competitors: 7 from 6 nations
- Winning time: 39.70

Medalists
1st place, gold medalist(s)		Edgar Navarro	Mexico
2nd place, silver medalist(s)		Tim Johansson	Sweden
3rd place, bronze medalist(s)		Alvise de Vidi	Italy

The T51 event consisted of a single race. It was won by Edgar Navarro, representing Mexico.

=== Final Round ===
25 Sept. 2004, 19:05

Rank	Athlete	Time	Notes
1st place, gold medalist(s)	Edgar Navarro (MEX)	39.70	WR
2nd place, silver medalist(s)	Tim Johansson (SWE)	40.15	
3rd place, bronze medalist(s)	Alvise de Vidi (ITA)	40.30	
4	Masanori Ueda (JPN)	41.03	
5	Mikkel Gaarder (NOR)	41.81	
6	Stefan Strobel (GER)	43.07	
7	Paolo D'Agostini (ITA)	43.77	

== T52 ==
Men's 200m T52 at the XII Paralympic Games
- Venue: Athens Olympic Stadium
- Dates: 26–27 September 2004
- Competitors: 11 from 8 nations
- Winning time: 31.22

Medalists
1st place, gold medalist(s)		Andre Beaudoin	Canada
2nd place, silver medalist(s)		Salvador Hernández	Mexico
3rd place, bronze medalist(s)		Beat Boesch	Switzerland

The T52 event consisted of 2 heats and a final. It was won by Andre Beaudoin, representing Canada.

=== 1st Round ===
Qualified for next round

Heat 1

26 Sept. 2004, 22:25

Rank	Athlete	Time	Notes
1	Andre Beaudoin (CAN)	32.31	Q
2	Salvador Hernández (MEX)	32.31	Q
3	Peth Rungsri (THA)	33.73	Q
4	Ian Rice (USA)	34.25	q
5	Lachlan Jones (AUS)	34.30	q

Heat 2

26 Sept. 2004, 22:31

Rank	Athlete	Time	Notes
1	Beat Boesch (SUI)	32.32	Q
2	Dean Bergeron (CAN)	33.23	Q
3	Yasunari Yaezawa (JPN)	35.21	Q
4	Paul Nitz (USA)	35.97	
5	Abdellah Ez Zine (MAR)	36.14	
	Santiago Velazquez (MEX)	DNS	

=== Final Round ===
27 Sept. 2004, 19:55

Rank	Athlete	Time	Notes
1st place, gold medalist(s)	Andre Beaudoin (CAN)	31.22	PR
2nd place, silver medalist(s)	Salvador Hernández (MEX)	31.46	
3rd place, bronze medalist(s)	Beat Boesch (SUI)	32.35	
4	Dean Bergeron (CAN)	32.45	
5	Peth Rungsri (THA)	32.50	
6	Ian Rice (USA)	33.83	
7	Lachlan Jones (AUS)	33.89	
8	Yasunari Yaezawa (JPN)	34.98	

== T53 ==
Men's 200m T53 at the XII Paralympic Games
- Venue: Athens Olympic Stadium
- Dates: 25–27 September 2004
- Competitors: 21 from 12 nations
- Winning time: 26.31

Medalists
1st place, gold medalist(s)		Hong Suk Man	South Korea
2nd place, silver medalist(s)		Hamad Aladwani	Kuwait
3rd place, bronze medalist(s)		Pichet Krungget	Thailand

The T53 event consisted of 3 heats and a final. It was won by Hong Suk Man, representing South Korea.

=== 1st Round ===
Qualified for next round

Heat 1

25 Sept. 2004, 11:30

Rank	Athlete	Time	Notes
1	Hong Suk Man (KOR)	26.48	WR Q
2	Hamad Aladwani (KUW)	26.58	Q
3	Sopa Intasen (THA)	26.93	q
4	Richard Colman (AUS)	27.42	q
5	John Fulham (IRL)	27.98	
6	Susumu Kangawa (JPN)	28.29	
7	Jacques Bouchard (CAN)	28.79	

Heat 2

25 Sept. 2004, 11:36

Rank	Athlete	Time	Notes
1	Pichet Krungget (THA)	26.77	Q
2	Christopher Waddell (USA)	28.01	Q
3	Jason Lachance (CAN)	28.24	
4	Jaime Ramirez (MEX)	28.35	
5	Mikhail Terentiev (RUS)	28.70	
6	Jun Hiromichi (JPN)	29.43	
	Charles Tolle (FRA)	DNS	

Heat 3

25 Sept. 2004, 11:42

Rank	Athlete	Time	Notes
1	Joshua George (USA)	26.70	Q
2	Pierre Fairbank (FRA)	27.03	Q
3	Eric Gauthier (CAN)	27.51	
4	Bojan Mitic (SUI)	27.57	
5	Sergey Shilov (RUS)	27.61	
6	John Lindsay (AUS)	28.18	
7	Hong Duk Ho (KOR)	28.84	

=== Final Round ===
27 Sept. 2004, 19:40

Rank	Athlete	Time	Notes
1st place, gold medalist(s)	Hong Suk Man (KOR)	26.31	WR
2nd place, silver medalist(s)	Hamad Aladwani (KUW)	26.37	
3rd place, bronze medalist(s)	Pichet Krungget (THA)	26.55	
4	Sopa Intasen (THA)	27.25	
5	Joshua George (USA)	27.44	
6	Christopher Waddell (USA)	28.10	
7	Richard Colman (AUS)	28.12	
8	Pierre Fairbank (FRA)	28.27	

== T54 ==
Men's 200m T54 at the XII Paralympic Games
- Venue: Athens Olympic Stadium
- Dates: 20–21 September 2004
- Competitors: 24 from 16 nations
- Winning time: 25.25

Medalists
1st place, gold medalist(s)		Leo Pekka Tahti	Finland
2nd place, silver medalist(s)		Kenny van Weeghel	Netherlands
3rd place, bronze medalist(s)		David Weir	Great Britain

The T54 event consisted of 3 heats and a final. It was won by Leo Pekka Tahti, representing Finland.

=== 1st Round ===
Qualified for next round

Heat 1

20 Sept. 2004, 12:00

Rank	Athlete	Time	Notes
1	Supachai Koysub (THA)	25.70	Q
2	Yoshifumi Nagao (JPN)	25.92	Q
3	Zhang Li Xin (CHN)	26.21	
4	Freddy Sandoval (MEX)	27.00	
5	Alejandro Maldonado (ARG)	27.54	
6	Nkegbe Botsyo (GHA)	27.57	
7	Brent Lakatos (CAN)	27.76	
8	Wilson de la Cruz (ECU)	30.60	

Heat 2

20 Sept. 2004, 12:06

Rank	Athlete	Time	Notes
1	Kenny van Weeghel (NED)	25.31	Q
2	David Holding (GBR)	25.81	Q
3	Claude Issorat (FRA)	26.01	q
4	Fernando Sanchez (MEX)	26.02	
5	Geoff Trappett (AUS)	26.56	
6	Prasit Thongchuen (THA)	27.03	
7	Daniel Normandin (CAN)	27.30	
8	Huang Zhian (CHN)	27.56	

Heat 3

20 Sept. 2004, 12:12

Rank	Athlete	Time	Notes
1	Leo Pekka Tahti (FIN)	25.22	Q
2	David Weir (GBR)	25.43	Q
3	Sebastian Cleem (GER)	25.95	q
4	Gonzalo Valdovinos (MEX)	26.60	
5	Ampai Sualuang (THA)	27.07	
6	Hubert Locco (FRA)	27.23	
7	Jasim Al Naqbi (UAE)	27.86	
8	Mukhtar Kamysbayev (KAZ)	31.67	

=== Final Round ===
21 Sept. 2004, 20:15

Rank	Athlete	Time	Notes
1st place, gold medalist(s)	Leo Pekka Tahti (FIN)	25.25	
2nd place, silver medalist(s)	Kenny van Weeghel (NED)	25.32	
3rd place, bronze medalist(s)	David Weir (GBR)	25.55	
4	Supachai Koysub (THA)	25.96	
5	Sebastian Cleem (GER)	26.08	
6	Yoshifumi Nagao (JPN)	26.09	
7	Claude Issorat (FRA)	26.12	
8	David Holding (GBR)	26.43	
