= Athletics at the 2008 Summer Paralympics – Men's 400 metres T53 =

The Men's 400m T53 had its First Round held on September 9 at 19:45 and its Final on September 11 at 18:42.

== Medalists ==
Gold	Suk-Man Hong; South Korea
Silver	Huzhao Li; China
Bronze	Richard Colman; Australia

== Results ==
Place	Athlete	Round 1	Final
1	Suk-Man Hong (KOR)	49.13 Q PR	47.67 WR
2	Huzhao Li (CHN)	52.50 Q	48.43
3	Richard Colman (AUS)	52.38 Q	48.92
4	Byung-Hoon Yoo (KOR)	52.19 Q	49.84
5	Brent Lakatos (CAN)	52.76 Q	50.40
6	Pierre Fairbank (FRA)	51.76 Q	50.84
7	Hamad Aladwani (KUW)	52.84 q	51.03
8	Jun Hiromichi (JPN)	52.78 q	51.54
9	Dong-Ho Jung (KOR)	53.47	
10	Jesus Aguilar (VEN)	53.50	
11	Sergey Shilov (RUS)	53.57	
12	Josh George (USA)	53.58	
13	Pichet Krungget (THA)	53.71	
14	Sopa Intasen (THA)	53.76	
15	Susumu Kangawa (JPN)	54.67	
16	Hitoshi Matsunaga (JPN)	55.38	
17	Eric Gauthier (CAN)	55.94	
18	Shiran Yu (CHN)	56.80	
19	Adam Bleakney (USA)	59.29	
20	Jaime Ramirez (MEX)	1:02.20	
	Ariosvaldo Silva (BRA)	DNS	
