= Athletics at the 2008 Summer Paralympics – Men's marathon T54 =

The Men's Marathon T54 had its Final on September 17 at 7:30.

== Medalists ==
Gold	Kurt Fearnley; Australia
Silver	Hiroki Sasahara; Japan
Bronze	Ernst van Dyk; South Africa

== Results ==
Place	Athlete	Class	Final
1	Kurt Fearnley (AUS)	T54	1:23:17 PR
2	Hiroki Sasahara (JPN)	T54	1:23:17
3	Ernst van Dyk (RSA)	T54	1:23:18
4	Aaron Gordian (MEX)	T54	1:23:20
5	Kota Hokinoue (JPN)	T54	1:23:22
6	Hiroyuki Yamamoto (JPN)	T54	1:23:22
7	Jun Hiromichi (JPN)	T53	1:23:23
8	Jorge Madera (ESP)	T54	1:23:26
9	Roger Puigbo (ESP)	T53	1:23:27
10	Ralph Brunner (GER)	T54	1:23:27
11	Rafael Botello (ESP)	T54	1:23:53
12	Masazumi Soejima (JPN)	T54	1:23:55
13	Choke Yasuoka (JPN)	T54	1:24:04
14	Heinz Frei (SUI)	T53	1:25:43
15	Tony Iniguez (USA)	T54	1:26:04
16	Michel Filteau (CAN)	T54	1:28:13
17	Josh George (USA)	T54	1:30:29
18	Alain Fuss (FRA)	T54	1:30:30
19	Ekkachai Janthon (THA)	T54	1:30:30
20	Alfonso Zaragoza (MEX)	T54	1:30:30
21	Khachonsak Thamsophon (THA)	T54	1:30:31
22	Tomasz Hamerlak (POL)	T54	1:30:31
23	Adam Bleakney (USA)	T53	1:30:36
24	Tyler Byers (USA)	T54	1:32:33
25	Jun Li (CHN)	T54	1:32:33
26	Aron Anderson (SWE)	T54	1:32:36
27	Tobias Lotscher (SUI)	T54	1:32:36
28	Ebbe Blichfeldt (DEN)	T54	1:35:14
29	Saul Mendoza (MEX)	T54	1:36:14
30	Fethi Zouinkhi (TUN)	T54	1:38:06
31	Yun-Oh Lee (KOR)	T53	1:38:44
32	Ji Zhao (CHN)	T54	1:40:00
33	Jialin Xiao (CHN)	T54	1:40:42
34	Brian Alldis (GBR)	T54	1:43:50
35	Alexandrino Silva (POR)	T54	1:47:21
	Marcel Hug (SUI)	T54	DNF
	Mark Ledo (CAN)	T54	DNF
	Denis Lemeunier (FRA)	T54	DNF
	Prawat Wahoram (THA)	T54	DNS
	David Weir (GBR)	T54	DNS

== See also ==
- Marathon at the Paralympics
