= Athletics at the 2008 Summer Paralympics – Men's 800 metres T53 =

The Men's 800m T53 had its First Round held on September 14 at 17:40 and its Final on September 15 at 18:48.

== Medalists ==
| Gold | Huzhao Li; China |
| Silver | Josh George; United States |
| Bronze | Suk-Man Hong; Australia |

== Results ==
| Place | Athlete | Round 1 | Final |
|---|---|---|---|
| 1 | Huzhao Li (CHN) | 1:38.34 Q | 1:36.30 WR |
| 2 | Josh George (USA) | 1:38.30 Q PR | 1:37.09 |
| 3 | Suk-Man Hong (KOR) | 1:39.52 Q | 1:37.45 |
| 4 | Richard Colman (AUS) | 1:39.90 Q | 1:37.49 |
| 5 | Roger Puigbo (ESP) | 1:41.40 Q | 1:37.50 |
| 6 | Heinz Frei (SUI) | 1:38.96 q | 1:37.68 |
| 7 | Byung-Hoon Yoo (KOR) | 1:38.65 Q | 1:37.80 |
| 8 | Jun Hiromichi (JPN) | 1:40.38 Q | 1:37.86 |
| 9 | Adam Bleakney (USA) | 1:40.94 | |
| 10 | Duk-Ho Hong (KOR) | 1:41.59 | |
| 11 | Pierre Fairbank (FRA) | 1:41.67 | |
| 12 | Sergey Shilov (RUS) | 1:42.40 | |
| 13 | Hitoshi Matsunaga (JPN) | 1:42.55 | |
| 14 | Sopa Intasen (THA) | 1:43.84 | |
| 15 | Pichet Krungget (THA) | 1:45.92 | |
| 16 | Susumu Kangawa (JPN) | 1:46.65 | |
| 17 | Eric Gauthier (CAN) | 1:48.11 | |
