= Athletics at the 2008 Summer Paralympics – Men's 400 metres T52 =

The Men's 400m T52 had its First Round held on September 11 at 20:35 and its Final on September 12 at 20:17.

== Medalists ==
Gold	Tomoya Ito; Japan
Silver	Toshihiro Takada; Japan
Bronze	Dean Bergeron; Canada

== Results ==
Place	Athlete	Round 1	Final
1	Tomoya Ito (JPN)	59.21 Q	57.25 PR
2	Toshihiro Takada (JPN)	1:02.91 q	1:00.32
3	Dean Bergeron (CAN)	59.16 Q PR	1:00.43
4	Thomas Geierspichler (AUT)	1:00.86 Q	1:01.03
5	Peth Rungsri (THA)	1:01.57 Q	1:02.12
6	Hirokazu Ueyonabaru (JPN)	1:01.11 Q	1:02.67
7	Steven Toyoji (USA)	1:04.37 q	1:05.41
8	Andre Beaudoin (CAN)	1:02.66 Q	1:05.58
9	Josh Roberts (USA)	1:05.22	
10	Beat Bosch (SUI)	1:05.60	
11	Salvador Hernandez (MEX)	1:06.20	
12	Omar Zidi (TUN)	1:08.03	
13	Chee Keong Eric Ting (SIN)	1:29.89	
