= Athletics at the 2008 Summer Paralympics – Men's 800 metres T52 =

The Men's 800m T52 had its First Round held on September 14 at 18:16 and its Final on September 16 at 10:31.

== Medalists ==
Gold	Tomoya Ito; Japan
Silver	Toshihiro Takada; Japan
Bronze	Thomas Geierspichler; Austria

== Results ==
Place	Athlete	Round 1	Final
1	Tomoya Ito (JPN)	1:52.31 Q WR	1:53.42
2	Toshihiro Takada (JPN)	1:58.91 Q	1:53.67
3	Thomas Geierspichler (AUT)	1:59.39 Q	1:56.26
4	Hirokazu Ueyonabaru (JPN)	2:00.84 Q	2:00.65
5	Santiago Jose Sanz (ESP)	1:58.98 Q	2:00.89
6	Dean Bergeron (CAN)	1:59.59 q	2:02.01
7	Andre Beaudoin (CAN)	2:08.69 q	2:08.54
8	Peth Rungsri (THA)	2:08.61 Q	2:10.83
9	Josh Roberts (USA)	2:21.10	
	Steven Toyoji (USA)	DSQ	
