= Kangawa =

Kangawa (written: 寒川 lit. "cold river") is a Japanese surname. Notable people with the surname include:

- Eugene Kangawa (寒川 裕人) (born 1989), Japanese artist
- Susumu Kangawa (寒川 進), Japanese Paralympic athlete
