= Athletics at the 2004 Summer Paralympics – Men's 5000 metres T52–54 =

Men's 5000m races for wheelchair athletes at the 2004 Summer Paralympics were held in the Athens Olympic Stadium. Events were held in two disability classes.

== T52 ==
Men's 5,000m T52 at the XII Paralympic Games
- Venue: Athens Olympic Stadium
- Dates: 19 September 2004
- Competitors: 9 from 6 nations
- Winning time: 13:10.86

Medalists
1st place, gold medalist(s)		Toshihiro Takada	Japan
2nd place, silver medalist(s)		Thomas Geierspichler	Austria
3rd place, bronze medalist(s)		Santiago Sanz	Spain

The T52 event consisted of a single race. It was won by Toshihiro Takada, representing Japan.

=== Final Round ===
19 Sept. 2004, 20:20

Rank	Athlete	Time	Notes
1st place, gold medalist(s)	Toshihiro Takada (JPN)	13:10.86	PR
2nd place, silver medalist(s)	Thomas Geierspichler (AUT)	13:10.94	
3rd place, bronze medalist(s)	Santiago Sanz (ESP)	13:12.65	
4	Tomoya Ito (JPN)	13:48.42	
5	Clayton Gerein (CAN)	13:48.82	
6	Richard Reelie (CAN)	13:49.15	
7	Per Vesterlund (SWE)	14:30.33	
8	Theodore Bridis (USA)	15:06.57	
9	Herbert Burns (USA)	15:44.70	

== T54 ==
Men's 5,000m T54 at the XII Paralympic Games
- Venue: Athens Olympic Stadium
- Dates: 22–24 September 2004
- Competitors: 26 from 14 nations
- Winning time: 10:23.98

Medalists
1st place, gold medalist(s)		Kurt Fearnley	Australia
2nd place, silver medalist(s)		Aaron Gordian	Mexico
3rd place, bronze medalist(s)		Ernst van Dyk	South Africa

The T54 event consisted of 2 heats and a final. It was won by Kurt Fearnley, representing Australia.

=== 1st Round ===
Qualified for next round

Heat 1

22 Sept. 2004, 09:35

Rank	Athlete	Time	Notes
1	Joël Jeannot (FRA)	10:24.37	PR Q
2	Kurt Fearnley (AUS)	10:24.54	Q
3	Choke Yasuoka (JPN)	10:24.95	Q
4	Ernst van Dyk (RSA)	10:25.20	Q
5	Kelly Smith (CAN)	10:25.44	q
6	Aaron Gordian (MEX)	10:25.61	q
7	Ralph Brunner (GER)	10:25.74	q
8	Heinz Frei (SUI)	10:25.76	q
9	Jacob Heilveil (USA)	10:25.83	
10	Martin Velasco Soria (MEX)	10:26.05	
11	Michel Filteau (CAN)	10:37.37	
12	Scot Hollonbeck (USA)	10:38.43	
13	Yevgeniy Tetyukhin (KAZ)	16:17.64	

Heat 2

22 Sept. 2004, 09:50

Rank	Athlete	Time	Notes
1	Prawat Wahorum (THA)	10:29.43	Q
2	Saúl Mendoza (MEX)	10:29.62	Q
3	Tomasz Hamerlak (POL)	10:29.89	Q
4	Marcel Hug (SUI)	10:29.93	Q
5	Krige Schabort (RSA)	10:30.07	
6	Alain Fuss (FRA)	10:30.23	
7	Mohamed Farhat Belkhir (TUN)	10:30.26	
8	Jeffrey Adams (CAN)	10:31.64	
9	Eric Teurnier (FRA)	10:32.75	
10	Tyler Byers (USA)	10:33.73	
11	Paul Nunnari (AUS)	11:08.42	
12	Sergey Ussoltsev (KAZ)	11:53.60	
	Mario Madriz (NCA)	DNF	

=== Final Round ===
24 Sept. 2004, 19:55

Rank	Athlete	Time	Notes
1st place, gold medalist(s)	Kurt Fearnley (AUS)	10:23.98	PR
2nd place, silver medalist(s)	Aaron Gordian (MEX)	10:24.38	
3rd place, bronze medalist(s)	Ernst van Dyk (RSA)	10:24.07	
4	Ralph Brunner (GER)	10:24.82	
5	Joël Jeannot (FRA)	10:25.35	
6	Marcel Hug (SUI)	10:25.51	
7	Kelly Smith (CAN)	10:25.52	
8	Prawat Wahorum (THA)	10:25.56	
9	Tomasz Hamerlak (POL)	10:26.43	
10	Choke Yasuoka (JPN)	10:26.63	
11	Heinz Frei (SUI)	10:26.64	
12	Saúl Mendoza (MEX)	10:26.76	
