= Athletics at the 2008 Summer Paralympics – Men's long jump F11 =

The Men's Long Jump F11 had its Final held on September 15 at 9:03.

== Medalists ==
Gold	Duan Li; China
Silver	Lex Gillette; United States
Bronze	Athanasios Barakas; Greece

== Results ==
Place	Athlete	1	2	3	4	5	6	Best
1	Duan Li (CHN)	6.61	6.42	x	x	6.59	6.39	6.61
2	Lex Gillette (USA)	x	6.01	6.24	5.88	6.46	4.28	6.46
3	Athanasios Barakas (GRE)	6.10	6.17	5.84	x	5.94	5.92	6.17
4	Javier Porras (ESP)	5.62	5.87	5.67	5.71	5.96	5.83	5.96
5	Koichi Takada (JPN)	5.74	5.70	5.53	5.68	5.36	5.73	5.74
6	Jakkrit Punthong (THA)	5.66	5.61	5.45	5.54	4.09	5.40	5.66
7	Lukas Hendry (SUI)	4.70	5.34	5.24	5.48	5.28	5.54	5.54
8	Viktar Zhukousky (BLR)	5.09	5.29	5.21	5.18	5.41	5.25	5.41
9	Sergey Sevostyanov (RUS)	5.25	5.21	4.94				5.25
