= Swimming at the 2008 Summer Paralympics – Women's 100 metre freestyle S5 =

Women's 100m Freestyle S5 at the XIII Paralympic Games
- Venue: Beijing National Aquatics Center
- Dates: 7 September
- Competitors: 12 from 10 nations
- Winning time: 1:16.65

Medalists
1st place, gold medalist(s)		Teresa Perales	Spain
2nd place, silver medalist(s)		Inbal Pezaro	Israel
3rd place, bronze medalist(s)		Bela Hlaváčková	Czech Republic

The women's 100m freestyle S5 event at the 2008 Summer Paralympics took place at the Beijing National Aquatics Center on 7 September. There were two heats; the swimmers with the eight fastest times advanced to the final.

== Results ==
=== Heats ===
Competed from 09:52.

==== Heat 1 ====
Rank	Name	Nationality	Time	Notes
1	Olena Akopyan	Ukraine	1:21.43	Q
2	Bela Hlaváčková	Czech Republic	1:22.24	Q
3	Mayumi Narita	Japan	1:27.53	Q
4	Yuka Kawamura	Japan	1:35.82	Q
5	Katalin Engelhardt	Hungary	1:42.71	
6	Adri Visser	South Africa	1:49.61	

==== Heat 2 ====
Rank	Name	Nationality	Time	Notes
1	Teresa Perales	Spain	1:22.22	Q
2	Inbal Pezaro	Israel	1:22.89	Q
3	Theresa Goh	Singapore	1:33.20	Q
4	Sugako Takeuchi	Japan	1:39.92	Q
5	Genevieve Pairoux-Lagardere	France	1:42.80	
6	Marin Morrison	United States	3:10.30	

=== Final ===
Source: Competed at 18:17.

Rank	Name	Nationality	Time	Notes
1st place, gold medalist(s)	Teresa Perales	Spain	1:16.65	WR
2nd place, silver medalist(s)	Inbal Pezaro	Israel	1:21.57	
3rd place, bronze medalist(s)	Bela Hlaváčková	Czech Republic	1:22.20	
4	Olena Akopyan	Ukraine	1:22.84	
5	Mayumi Narita	Japan	1:27.90	
6	Theresa Goh	Singapore	1:32.92	
7	Yuka Kawamura	Japan	1:35.72	
8	Sugako Takeuchi	Japan	1:38.21	

Q = qualified for final. WR = World Record.
