= Hong Suk-man =

South Korean Paralympic athlete

Personal information
- Born: 7 December 1975 (age 50)

Sport
- Sport: Paralympic athletics
- Disability class: T53
Medal record
Track and field
Representing South Korea
Paralympic Games
Gold medal – first place	2004 Athens	100m T53
Gold medal – first place	2004 Athens	200m T53
Gold medal – first place	2008 Beijing	400m T53
Silver medal – second place	2004 Athens	400m T53
Bronze medal – third place	2008 Beijing	200m T53
Bronze medal – third place	2008 Beijing	4x100m T53-54
Bronze medal – third place	2008 Beijing	800m T53
World Para Athletics Championships
Silver medal – second place	2011 Christchurch	4x400m relay T53-54
Bronze medal – third place	2006 Assen	200m T53
Bronze medal – third place	2013 Lyon	4x400m relay T53-54
Asian Para Games
Gold medal – first place	2010 Guangzhou	800m T53
Bronze medal – third place	2010 Guangzhou	4x100m relay T53-54
Bronze medal – third place	2014 Incheon	1500m T54
Bronze medal – third place	2014 Incheon	4x400m relay T53-54

Hong Suk-Man (Korean: 홍석만) is a Paralympian athlete from South Korea competing mainly in category T53 sprint events.

He competed in the 2004 Summer Paralympics in Athens, Greece. There he won a gold medal in the men's 100 metres - T53 event, a gold medal in the men's 200 metres - T53 event, a silver medal in the men's 400 metres - T53 event and was disqualified in the men's 4 x 400 metre relay - T53-54 event. He also competed at the 2008 Summer Paralympics in Beijing, China. There he won a gold medal in the men's 400 metres - T53 event, a bronze medal in the men's 200 metres - T53 event, a bronze medal in the men's 4 x 100 metre relay - T53-54 event and a bronze medal in the men's 800 metres - T53 event
