= Marin Morrison =

American Paralympic swimmer

Personal information
- Nationality: American
- Born: June 19, 1990 Great Falls, Montana
- Died: January 2, 2009 (aged 18) Sammamish, Washington
- Education: Collins Hill High School; Eastlake High School
- Height: 5 ft 5 in (1.65 m)

Sport
- Country: United States
- Sport: Paralympic swimming
- Disability class: S5

Marin Morrison (June 19, 1990 – January 2, 2009) was an American Paralympic swimmer who competed at the 2008 Summer Paralympics in Beijing. She began swimming at an early age and grew to be a national-level age-group standout. Morrison broke two school swimming time records as a freshman at Collins Hill High School, and was third in the 100-yard freestyle competition at the Georgia state Class AAA championship in early 2005.

She fell ill afterward, and a large tumor was found in her left temporal lobe, requiring two consecutive emergency operations. A third surgery to remove more of the agressive, cancerous tumor caused the paralysis of the right side of her body and a speech impediment. Nevertheless, she established two national records in the S5 category, and qualified for the 2008 Summer Paralympics at the 2008 US Paralympic Swimming Trials, where she did not medal. An annual award and foundation were named after Morrison following her death. A 2026 memoir authored by her father, Touched ~ The Marin Morrison Story

== Biography ==
Marin Morrison was born on June 19, 1990, in Great Falls, Montana, to sportscaster Matt Morrison and personal trainer Nancy Morrison. She was primarily given the name Marin because her father was raised in Marin County, California, and is derived from the Latin "of the sea". Morrison was the oldest of three siblings; she had a younger sister, Camlyn, and a younger brother, Michael. She spent part of her childhood in Lansing, Michigan, and later Jacksonville, Florida.

She began swimming at the age of two, entered her first league when she was six, and participated in her first meet soon after. Morrison began having seizures at the age of two and was diagnosed with epilepsy, requiring medication to help counter its symptoms. She was first educated at St Joseph's Catholic School, and later diagnosed with a learning disability, leading her to spend hours at a time on a section of text to understand its meaning. By the time Morrison reached fifth grade, the family moved to Atlanta, after her father acquired employment as an anchor for Fox Sports Net. She trained with the SwimAtlanta team under coach Chris Davis, and excelled in the 100-yard freestyle and backstroke disciplines.

When Morrison was a freshman at Collins Hill High School, she broke the 100-yard freestyle and backstroke school records in 2005, and was 1 1/2 seconds slower than the times required to progress to the 2004 United States Olympic Trials. She was one of the favorites to win the Georgia state Class AAAAA championship in the 100-yard freestyle, finishing third in that discipline and 12th in the 100-yard backstroke. During the state meet, Morrison reported having double vision and dizziness. She nevertheless helped the SwimAtlanta team win four relays at the Short Course Championships in Savannah, Georgia, though her times were slower than she expected, and her condition deteriorated.

Morrison visited an optometrist, who told her parents to take her to an emergency room and seek a neurologist. She was later taken to visit a pediatrician, and then to the Children's Healthcare of Atlanta - Egleston Hospital, where an MRI scan revealed a large benign tumor in her left temporal lobe, which controls movement and speech. 30 percent of the tumor was removed by surgeons in consecutive surgeries in March 2005, and Morrison recovered enough to return to swimming 12 days later. She and three friends of hers set new records for the 200-meter medley relay and the 200-meter free relay at a mid-2005 meet in Gwinnett County.

Morrison again had double vision in July 2005. A second MRI scan revealed a return of the tumor, and that it was growing aggressively on her brain's left temporal lobe as a rare cancer called anaplastic astrocytoma ganglioglioma. Her surgery on August 15 saw surgeons remove the tumor though the operation was complicated by a large blood clot that caused paralysis to the right side of her body. Morrison also was affected by expressive aphasia with apraxia of speech, and lost all sight in her right eye. Morrison underwent radiation treatments to eliminate remnants of her cancer, and the family moved to Seattle in November 2005, joining the Bellevue Swim Club. The family also saw a team of pedantic oncologists at the Children's Hospital and Regional Medical Center, and were told that Morrison had four to six months to live.

She was put on a strict macrobiotic diet to prevent the release of energy while digesting food, and was enrolled in a homebound academic program at nearby Eastlake High School, by a special education teacher from Lake Washington School District. A rehabilitation nurse at the Children's Hospital encouraged the family to enter Morrison into a meet in Michigan in late 2006. She was classified S5, and established two national records, which she was told were enough to qualify for the 2008 Summer Paralympics. Morrison reached the 2008 US Paralympic Swimming Trials in Minneapolis, qualifying for the women's S5 50 meters backstroke competition. She was allowed to select two additional events to compete in, opting for the women's 50 metres freestyle and the women's S5 100 metres freestyle disciplines.

Afterward, Morrison's health deteriorated and she required a fourth brain surgery on May 2 to stem intracranial bleeding. She spent the next six weeks at the Children's Hospital, requiring the full-time use of a wheelchair and wore an eye-patch over her left eye to retain her equilibrium. Morrison was too unwell to travel with the United States delegation to Beijing, so her family raised capital from local community funding for her travel to the Paralympic Games. She was not expected to win a medal. On 7 September, Morrison took part in the women's 100 metre freestyle S5 competition, finishing sixth and last in the second heat with a time of 3 minutes and 10.30 seconds, and was eliminated from the event since she was slowest overall. The following day, she was disqualified from the women's 50 metre backstroke S5 competition for unspecified reasons, and finished last overall in the women's 50 metre freestyle S5 race with a time of 1 minute and 35.60 seconds.

After the Games, Morrison's condition further deteriorated, causing her to sleep heavily, though she attended a reception for the United States Olympic and Paralympic teams hosted by President George W. Bush and the First Lady Laura Bush at the White House in October 2008. She was featured in a November 2008 NBC Sports documentary about nine American para-athletes training and preparing for the Beijing Paralympics. Morrison died on the morning of January 2, 2009, in Sammamish, Washington. On the evening of January 7, a memorial service was held for Morrison at the Timberlake Christian Fellowship in Redmond, Washington, attended by more than one hundred people. A funeral service that was broadcast on the Internet took place three days later at the Green Hills Memorial Park in Palo Verde, California.

== Legacy ==
In August 2008, Morrison received recognition for her achievements by Dave Reichert, a member of the United States House of Representatives from Washington's 8th congressional district. After her death, the Morrison family began the annual Marin Morrison Award, and established a scholarship foundation in her name. Pacific North West Swimming founded the Marin Morrison Memorial Meet in 2009 to allow disabled persons to compete in competitive swimming competitions. A documentary film called Touch the Wall — The Marin Morrison Story was released in 2013.The tribute-memoir book Touched ~ The Marin Morrison Story second edition, was published in 2026.
