= Swimming at the 2008 Summer Paralympics – Women's 50 metre freestyle S5 =

Women's 50m Freestyle S5 at the XIII Paralympic Games
- Venue: Beijing National Aquatics Center
- Dates: 15 September
- Competitors: 14 from 12 nations
- Winning time: 35.88

Medalists
1st place, gold medalist(s)		Teresa Perales	Spain
2nd place, silver medalist(s)		Bela Hlaváčková	Czech Republic
3rd place, bronze medalist(s)		Olena Akopyan	Ukraine

The women's 50m freestyle S5 event at the 2008 Summer Paralympics took place at the Beijing National Aquatics Center on 15 September. There were two heats; the swimmers with the eight fastest times advanced to the final.

== Results ==
=== Heats ===
Competed from 10:04.

==== Heat 1 ====
Rank	Name	Nationality	Time	Notes	Ref
1	Teresa Perales	Spain	36.75	Q, PR	
2	Inbal Pezaro	Israel	38.54	Q	
3	Mayumi Narita	Japan	39.96	Q	
4	Lisette Teunissen	Netherlands	45.68		
5	Genevieve Pairoux-Lagardere	France	45.83		
6	Yuka Kawamura	Japan	46.56		
7	Marin Morrison	United States	1:35.60		

==== Heat 2 ====
Rank	Name	Nationality	Time	Notes	Ref
1	Bela Hlaváčková	Czech Republic	36.90	Q	
2	Olena Akopyan	Ukraine	37.90	Q	
3	Sugako Takeuchi	Japan	43.72	Q	
4	Katalin Engelhardt	Hungary	44.89	Q	
5	Karina Lauridsen	Denmark	44.90	Q	
6	Simone Fragoso	Portugal	45.69		
7	Theresa Goh	Singapore	53.67		

=== Final ===
Competed at 19:04.

Rank	Name	Nationality	Time	Notes	Ref
1st place, gold medalist(s)	Teresa Perales	Spain	35.88	WR	
2nd place, silver medalist(s)	Bela Hlaváčková	Czech Republic	37.12		
3rd place, bronze medalist(s)	Olena Akopyan	Ukraine	37.53		
4	Inbal Pezaro	Israel	38.69		
5	Mayumi Narita	Japan	39.99		
6	Sugako Takeuchi	Japan	44.04		
7	Karina Lauridsen	Denmark	44.69		
8	Katalin Engelhardt	Hungary	45.78		
