= Athletics at the 2008 Summer Paralympics – Men's marathon T52 =

The Men's Marathon T52 had its Final on September 17 at 7:30.

== Medalists ==
Gold	Thomas Geierspichler; Austria
Silver	Hirokazu Ueyonabaru; Japan
Bronze	Toshihiro Takada; Japan

== Results ==
Place	Athlete	Final
1	Thomas Geierspichler (AUT)	1:40:07 WR
2	Hirokazu Ueyonabaru (JPN)	1:40:10
3	Toshihiro Takada (JPN)	1:40:20
4	Santiago Jose Sanz (JPN)	1:42:05
5	Steven Toyoji (USA)	1:58:37
6	Clayton Gerein (CAN)	2:08:04
7	Omar Zidi (TUN)	2:09:04

== See also ==
- Marathon at the Paralympics
