= Eugene Kangawa =

Japanese artist (born 1989)

- Born: 1989 (age 36–37)
- Occupation: Artist

Eugene Kangawa (寒川 裕人, Kangawa Eugene; born in 1989) is a contemporary artist born in the United States and currently based in Japan, where he maintains his studio.

== Early life ==
Kangawa is known primarily for his installations and large-scale paintings. He garnered significant attention with his solo exhibition After the Rainbow (2021–2022) at the Museum of Contemporary Art Tokyo (MOT), becoming the youngest artist in the museum’s history to receive a solo exhibition organized by the institution at the age of 32. This exhibition was critically acclaimed on an international scale and led to the announcement that a permanent museum dedicated to Kangawa's works is under construction near a UNESCO World Heritage Site in Bali, Indonesia. The museum is reportedly being built on a site measuring approximately 3,500 square meters.The establishment of a permanent museum resulting from the ripple effects of a single exhibition—where nearly all exhibited works are acquired and housed—is an exceptionally rare occurrence in the contemporary art world and has been widely recognized as a landmark development.

Local media have referred to this new institution as a potential "new sanctuary", and its coverage has extended to prominent international outlets such as The New York Times weekend edition and The Financial Times.

In a weekend edition of The New York Times, Kangawa's 2021 exhibition was reviewed as follows: "Exploring the potential for coexistence between humanity and nature, and between the real and the imagined, Kangawa has established himself as a piercing voice in a divided era. The exhibition is distinguished by its detailed examination of the permeability between private and public space."

Kangawa was also featured in the 2017 publication The Age of Art × Technology as one of four leading contemporary artists in Japan, alongside collectives such as teamLab. His short film produced in 2021 was officially selected and awarded at several American film festivals, including the Rhode Island International Film Festival, the Brooklyn Film Festival, and the Pan African Film Festival, earning him international recognition as a filmmaker as well.

== Early life and education ==
Kangawa was born in 1989 in the United States due to his father's work-related assignment abroad. In an interview featured in the column Let’s Talk Art Again Today by Masamichi Toyama and Yoshio Suzuki, he described his upbringing in Shukugawa, Nishinomiya, Hyogo Prefecture—a city associated with authors such as Haruki Murakami and Shusaku Endo. During his high school years, he was deeply influenced by reading books by and about artists, which led him to pursue a path in contemporary art.

In a booklet co-published by Bijutsu Techo and the Museum of Contemporary Art Tokyo, Kangawa stated that the loss of his mother during his first year at university was a pivotal turning point in shaping his artistic vision. Reflecting on his earlier inability to appreciate certain conceptual artworks, he remarked that as a high school student, he was in a "regrettable state of not yet understanding the multiplicity of things."

== Career ==
After graduating from university, Kangawa participated in several major exhibitions, including the solo show 1/2 Century Later. at Shiseido Gallery (2017), the 89+ project at the Serpentine Galleries in London (2014), and De-Sport: The Deconstruction and Reconstruction of Sports Through Art at the 21st Century Museum of Contemporary Art, Kanazawa (2020). His 2021–2022 solo exhibition at the Museum of Contemporary Art Tokyo—following in the footsteps of previous solo exhibitions by major Japanese artists such as Yayoi Kusama, Yoko Ono, and Kohei Nawa—generated extraordinary public interest, with record-breaking attendance and long queues forming during the run.

Following the international acclaim of this exhibition, a permanent museum dedicated to Eugene Kangawa / EUGENE STUDIO is currently under construction in Bali, spearheaded by a group of Asian art collectors and local organizers. The museum is scheduled to open in 2026. Unlike Kangawa’s personal studio, the architectural design of this museum is being undertaken by an Indonesian architect. In the interview, Kangawa expressed his gratitude, saying, "I am thankful for the proposal of a permanent museum—something I had never even imagined. Naturally, such a cross-border initiative is only possible thanks to the generous support of so many people who value the work. It belongs to everyone involved, and I hope it becomes a cherished place for all."

In interviews, Kangawa has cited two major turning points in his life:"The death of my mother before I turned 20, and a friend in high school lending me a book about Ray Kurzweil's The Singularity Is Near. Reading that book made me feel that I had discovered a path I must pursue in order to fulfill my role as a human being." He also reflected on the transformative effect of creating and exhibiting works during the global shifts brought on by the COVID-19 pandemic, describing the experience as profoundly influential on his creative direction.

In an article, Yoshio Suzuki, deputy editor-in-chief of Brutus magazine, remarked of Kangawa:"He appears to be extraordinarily delicate, yet at the same time, bold—and highly knowledgeable. I was once again struck by the depth of his capacity for both input and output."

In 2026, Kangawa's piece titled Chair in Japanese Nuki and Dami style, The Everyday at the Atelier (Standard / Child Scale) was included in the Tokai Project, the second edition of the Craft x Tech initiative. The programme is part of a movement that "explores how inherited knowledge can evolve without losing its soul" and has been described as "one of the most interesting conversations happening today." The work was unveiled in Tokyo at Kudan house, and subsequently exhibited in the Victoria and Albert Museum during the London Design Festival.
