= Ernst van Dyk =

South African wheelchair racer

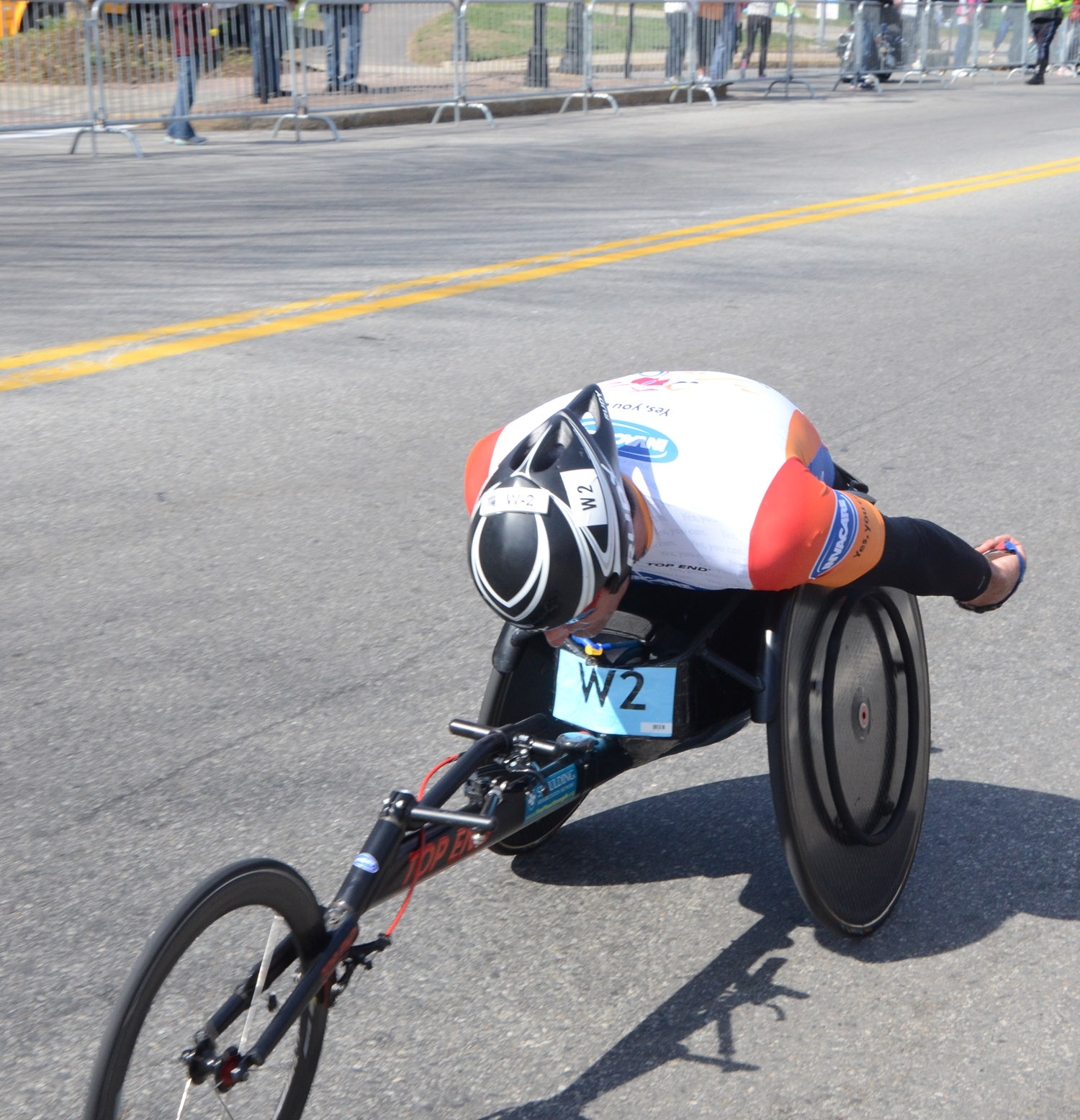
- van Dyk at the 2014 Boston Marathon

Personal information
- Nationality: South African
- Born: Ernst Francois van Dyk; 4 April 1973 (age 53) Ceres, South Africa

Sport
- Disability: Congenital – Genetic
- Disability class: T54

Achievements and titles
- Paralympic finals: 2000; 2004; 2008; 2012
Medal record
| Event | 1st | 2nd | 3rd |
|---|---|---|---|
| Paralympic Games | 2 | 3 | 3 |
| World Championships | 2 | 1 | 2 |
Representing South Africa
Men's paralympic athletics
Paralympic Games
| Silver medal – second place | 2004 Athens | 800 m T54 |
| Silver medal – second place | 2004 Athens | 1500 m T54 |
| Bronze medal – third place | 2000 Sydney | 400 m T54 |
| Bronze medal – third place | 2004 Athens | 5000 m T54 |
| Bronze medal – third place | 2008 Beijing | Marathon T54 |
Men's paralympic cycling
Paralympic Games
| Gold medal – first place | 2008 Beijing | Road race HC–C |
| Gold medal – first place | 2016 Rio de Janeiro | Road race H5 |
| Silver medal – second place | 2012 London | Road race H4 |

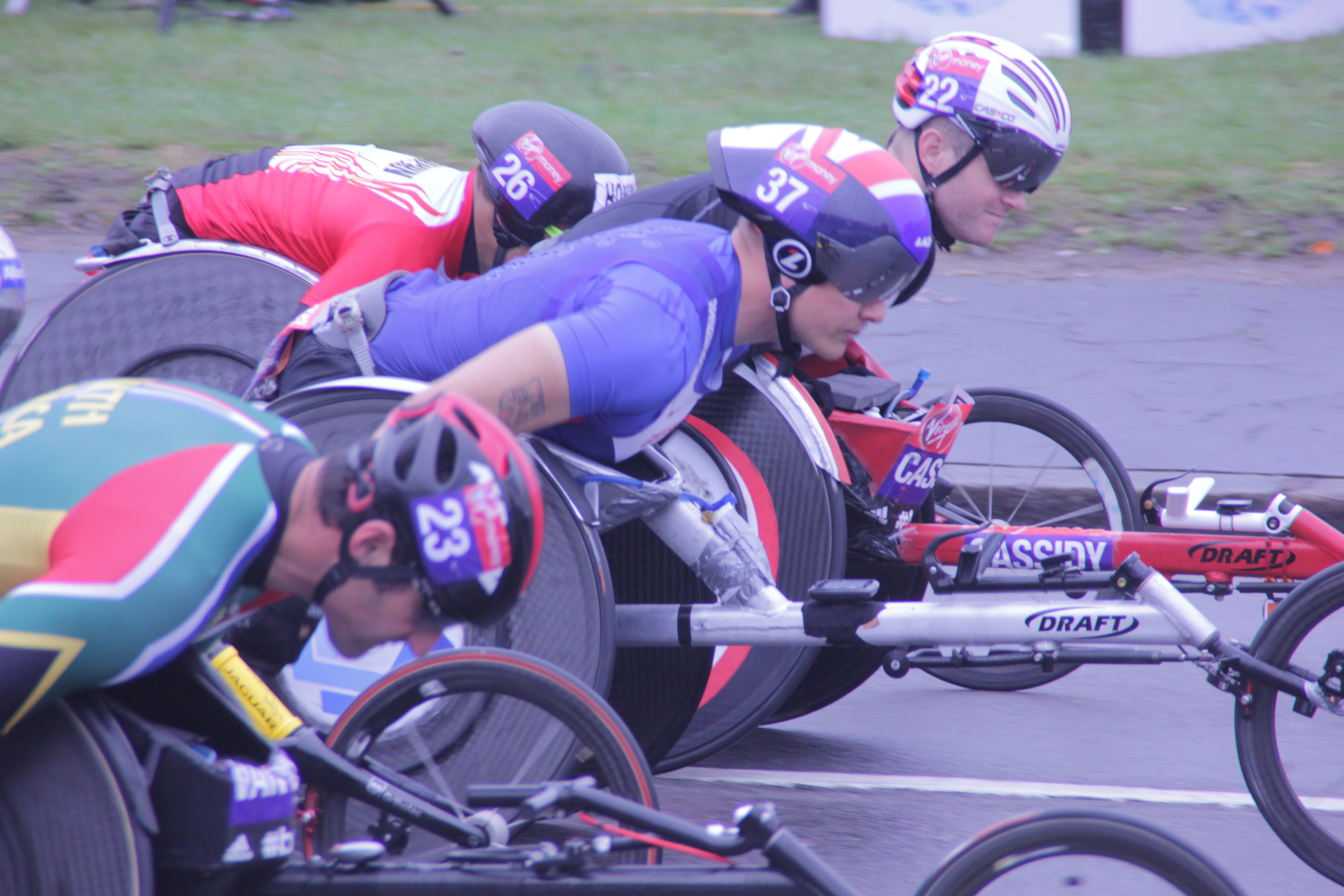
Ernst Van Dyk (23) at the start of the 2015 London Marathon

Ernst Francois van Dyk OIS (born 4 April 1973) is a South African wheelchair racer and handcyclist. He has won a record 10 wheelchair titles in the Boston Marathon. He was also awarded the Laureus World Sports Awards for Sportsperson with a Disability of the year for 2006. At the 2000 Summer Paralympics in Sydney, he won a bronze medal in the 400 metres. At the 2004 Summer Paralympics in Athens, he won a silver medal in the 800 metre race, another silver in the 1500 metres, and a bronze in the 5000 metres. At the 2008 Summer Paralympics in Beijing van Dyk won gold in the handcycling road race as well as bronze in the wheelchair marathon. Other handcycling achievements include: Obtaining a silver and bronze medal at the 2009 UCI Para-cycling Road World Championships held in Italy and taking double gold (road race and time trial) at the 2007 UCI Para-cycling Road World Championships held in Bordeaux.

== Career ==
Van Dyk was born with congenital absence of both legs. His parents, two provincial-level athletes, recognized his athletic abilities and encouraged sports participation. At first he went to school in Graaff-Reinet, but the school couldn't cater for him. He then attended the Elizabeth Conradie School for disabled children in Kimberley. He competed as a swimmer nationally in his teens. In 1992 he enrolled in Stellenbosch University and competed in the Barcelona Paralympics as a swimmer and wheelchair athlete. Thereafter, he concentrated on wheelchair athletics.

=== Major results ===
| Year | Boston Marathon | New York City Marathon | Paris Marathon | Los Angeles Marathon | London Marathon | Great North Run |
|---|---|---|---|---|---|---|
| 2001 | 1:25:12 | | | | | |
| 2002 | 1:23:19 | 1:45:16 | | 1:28:44 | | |
| 2003 | 1:28:32 | 1:35:36 | | | | |
| 2004 | 1:18:27 | | | | | |
| 2005 | 1:24:11 | 1:31.11 | Gold medal | | | |
| 2006 | 1:25:29 | | | 1:24:48 (CR) | | |
| 2007 | | | | | | 42:35 |
| 2008 | 1:26:49 | | | | | |
| 2009 | 1:33:29 | | | | 1:28:59 | |
| 2010 | 1:26:53 | | | | | |
| 2011 | 1:18:51 | | | | | |
| 2012 | | | | | | |
| 2013 | | 1:40:14 | | | 1:31:30 | |
| 2014 | 1:20:36 | 1:30:56 | | | 1:32:42 | |
| 2015 | 1:36:27 | 1:30:54 | | | 1:31:38 | |
| 2016 | 1:24:06 | | | | 1:35:23 | |
WR – World Record; CR – Course record

His 9th win in the 2011 Boston Marathon was a record for that event in any class. As of 21 April 2014 he has won ten. On 20 April 2010 the South African government announced that van Dyk will be awarded the Order of Ikhamanga in silver for his achievements in sport.

== Personal life ==
He lives in Paarl, Western Cape with his wife and two daughters. He works for Össur South Africa as the managing director.
