= Hiroki Sasahara =

Japanese Paralympic athlete

Medal record

Paralympic athletics

Representing Japan

Paralympic Games
Silver medal – second place	2008 Beijing	Marathon - T54

Hiroki Sasahara (笹原 廣喜, Sasahara Hiroki) is a Paralympian athlete from Japan competing mainly in category T54 long-distance events.

Sasahara was born on April 20, 1974, in Bungotakada City, Oita Prefecture. He competed in the 2004 Summer Paralympics in Athens, Greece. There he finished tenth in the men's 10000 metres - T54 event and finished ninth in the men's Marathon - T54 event. He also competed at the 2008 Summer Paralympics in Beijing, China. There he won a silver medal in the men's Marathon - T54 event and went out in the semi-finals of the men's 800 metres - T54 event
