= Thomas Geierspichler =

Austrian Paralympic athlete

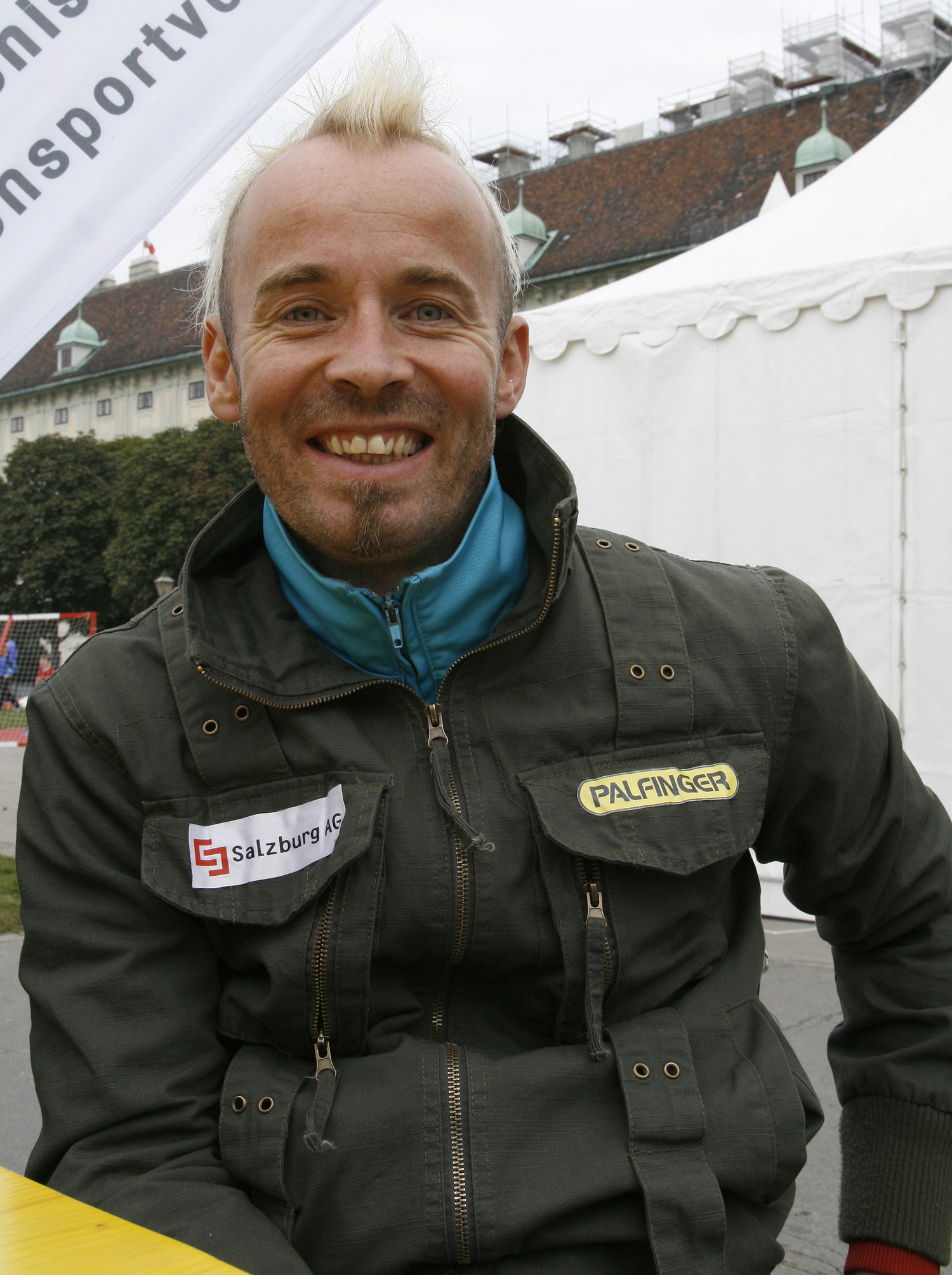
- Thomas Geierspichler (2008)

Medal record

Paralympic athletics

Representing Austria

Paralympic Games
Gold medal – first place	2004 Athens	1500m - T52
Gold medal – first place	2008 Beijing	Marathon - T52
Silver medal – second place	2004 Athens	800m - T52
Silver medal – second place	2004 Athens	5000m - T52
Silver medal – second place	2004 Athens	Marathon - T52
Bronze medal – third place	2000 Sydney	Marathon - T52
Bronze medal – third place	2004 Athens	400m - T52
Bronze medal – third place	2000 Sydney	800m - T52

World Championships
Silver medal – second place	2013 Lyon	1,500m - T52
Silver medal – second place	2023 Paris	1,500m - T52
Bronze medal – third place	2013 Lyon	400m - T52

IPC European Championships
Gold medal – first place	2014 Swansea	1,500m - T52
Gold medal – first place	2016 Grosseto	400m - T52
Gold medal – first place	2016 Grosseto	1,500m - T52

Thomas Geierspichler (born 14 April 1976) is a Paralympic wheelchair racer from Austria. He competes in the T52 classification.

== Career ==
He competed in the 2000 Summer Paralympics in Sydney, Australia. There he won a bronze medal in the men's Marathon - T52 event, went out in the first round of the men's 800 metres - T52 event, finished sixth in the men's 1500 metres - T52 event and finished eighth in the men's 5000 metres - T52 event. He also competed at the 2004 Summer Paralympics in Athens, Greece. There he won a gold medal in the men's 1500 metres - T52 event, a silver medal in the men's 800 metres - T52 event, a silver medal in the men's 5000 metres - T52 event, a silver medal in the men's Marathon - T52 event and a bronze medal in the men's 400 metres - T52 event. He also competed at the 2008 Summer Paralympics in Beijing, China. There he won a gold medal in the men's Marathon - T52 event, a bronze medal in the men's 800 metres - T52 event, finished fifth in the men's 200 metres - T52 event and finished fourth in the men's 400 metres - T52 event

As of January 2013, he holds T52 world records for 10000m and marathon distances.
