= Toshihiro Takada =

Japanese Paralympic athlete

Medal record

Track and field (T52)

Representing Japan

Paralympic Games
| Gold medal – first place | 2004 Athens | Marathon - T52 |
| Gold medal – first place | 2004 Athens | 5000m - T52 |
| Gold medal – first place | 2004 Athens | 400m - T52 |
| Silver medal – second place | 2008 Beijing | 400m - T52 |
| Silver medal – second place | 2008 Beijing | 800m - T52 |
| Bronze medal – third place | 2004 Athens | 1500m - T52 |
| Bronze medal – third place | 2008 Beijing | Marathon - T52 |

Toshihiro Takada (高田 稔浩, Takada Toshihiro) is a Paralympian athlete from Japan competing mainly in category T52 long-distance events.

== Olympic career ==
Takada competed in the 2004 Summer Paralympics in Athens, Greece where he won a gold medal in the men's Marathon - T52 event, a gold medal in the men's 5000 metres - T52 event, a gold medal in the men's 400 metres - T52 event and a bronze medal in the men's 1500 metres - T52 event. He also competed at the 2008 Summer Paralympics in Beijing, China. There he won a silver medal in the men's 400 metres - T52 event, a silver medal in the men's 800 metres - T52 event and a bronze medal in the men's Marathon - T52 event
