= Abdellah Ez Zine =

Moroccan Paralympic athlete

Medal record

Paralympic athletics

Representing Morocco

Paralympic Games
Gold medal – first place	2004 Athens	800 metres - T52

Abdellah Ez Zine is a paralympic athlete from Morocco competing mainly in category T52 sprint and middle-distance events.

Abdellah competed in the 200m and 400m in the 2004 Summer Paralympics where he also won a gold medal in the T52 800m.
