= Koichi Takada =

Japanese Paralympic athlete

Medal record

Paralympic athletics

Representing Japan

Paralympic Games
Silver medal – second place	2000 Sydney	4x100 metre relay - T13
Bronze medal – third place	1992 Barcelona	Long Jump - B2

Koichi Takada (高田 幸一, Takada Kōichi) is a paralympic athlete from Japan competing mainly in category F11 long jump and T11 sprint events.

Koichi competed in three Paralympics, his first in 1992 he won a bronze medal in the B3 long jump. After missing the 1996 games he again competed in 2000 in the long jump and 100m but won a silver medal in the 4 × 100 m as part of the Japanese team. He again missed a Paralympics before competing in the 2008 Summer Paralympics where despite competing in the 100m and long jump these were the first games that Koichi failed to win a medal.
