= Richard Colman =

Australian Paralympic athlete

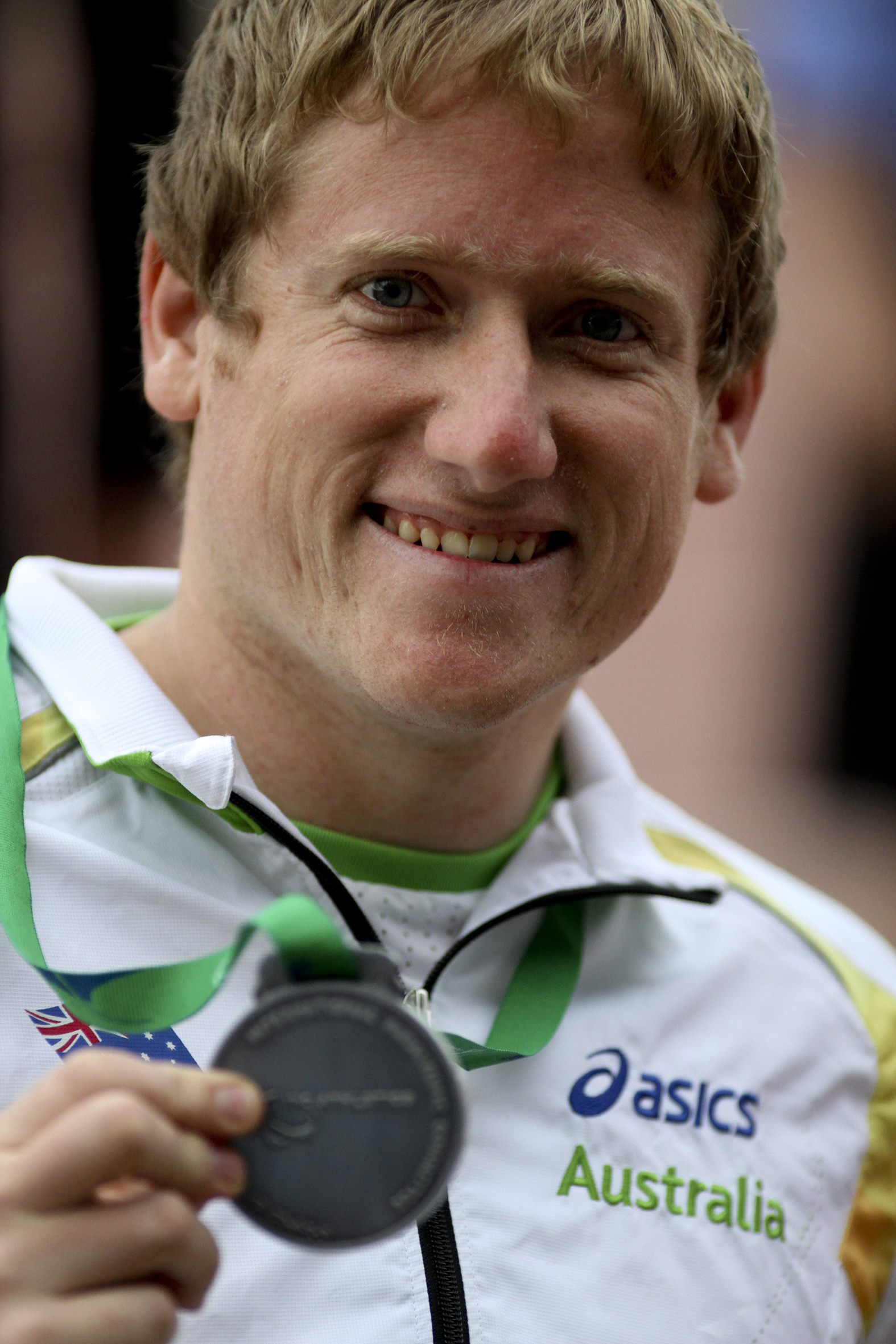
- Colman showing the silver medal he won in the 400 m at the 2011 IPC Athletics World Championships

Personal information
- Born: 28 November 1984 (age 41) Stavanger, Norway

Sport
- Disability class: T53
Medal record
Men's para athletics
Representing Australia
Paralympic Games
Gold medal – first place	2004 Athens	800 m T53
Gold medal – first place	2012 London	800 m T53
Silver medal – second place	2004 Athens	4x100 m T53–54
Silver medal – second place	2008 Beijing	200 m T53
Bronze medal – third place	2008 Beijing	400 m T53
Bronze medal – third place	2012 London	400 m T53
Bronze medal – third place	2012 London	4x400 m T53/54
World Championships
Gold medal – first place	2011 Christchurch	800 m T53
Silver medal – second place	2011 Christchurch	400m T53
Bronze medal – third place	2002 Lille	400 m T53
Bronze medal – third place	2006 Assen	800 m T53
Bronze medal – third place	2013 Lyon	800 m T53
Bronze medal – third place	2013 Lyon	1500 m T53
Commonwealth Games
Silver medal – second place	2010 Delhi	1500 m T54

Richard Andrew Colman AM (born 28 November 1984 in Stavanger, Norway) is an Australian Paralympic athlete, competing mainly in category T53 sprint events. He was born with spina bifida. He represented Australia at the four Paralympics - 2004 to 2016.

== Paralympics ==
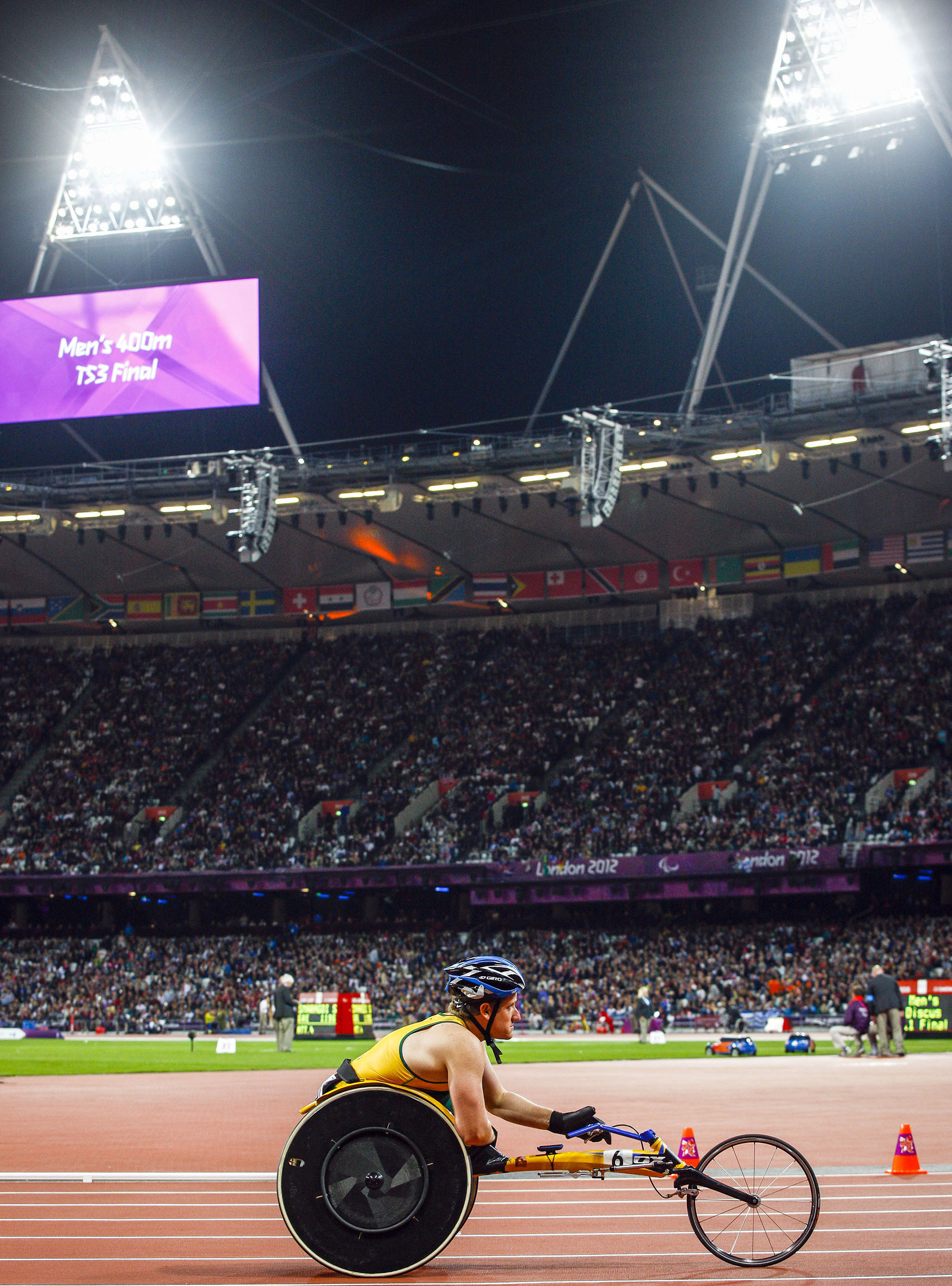
Colman at the 2012 London Paralympics

Colman competed at the 2004 Athens Paralympics, where he won a gold medal in the men's 800 m – T53 event, for which he received a Medal of the Order of Australia, a silver medal in the men's 4 x 100 m relay – T53–54 event, went out in the first round of the men's 100 m – T53 event, finished seventh in the men's 200 m – T53 event, finished sixth in the men's 400 m – T53 event, went out in the first round of the men's 4 x 400 m relay – T53-54 event.

He also competed at the 2008 Beijing Paralympics, where he won a silver medal in the men's 200 m – T53 event, a bronze medal in the men's 400 m – T53 event, was disqualified in the men's 4 x 100 m relay – T53-54 event and finished fourth in the men's 800 m – T53 event.

At the 2012 London Paralympics, he won a gold medal in the Men's 800 m T53 event and two bronze medals in the Men's 400 m T53 and Men's 4x400 m T53/54 events;, he also came seventh in the Men's 200 m T53- event.

At the 2016 Rio Paralympics, he finished 12th ranked in Men's 400 m T53 heats and 8th in the Men's 800 m T53 heats and did not advance to the finals.

=== Commonwealth Games ===
Colman won a silver medal in the 1500 m T54 at the 2010 Delhi Commonwealth Games and came fourth in the same event at the 2014 competition.

== IPC Athletics World Championships ==
Colman has competed at four IPC Athletics World Championships. In 2002, he won a bronze medal in the Men's 400 m T53. In 2006, he won a bronze medal in the Men's 800 m T53. At the 2011 Championships, he won a gold medal in the Men's s 800m T53 and a silver medal in the Men's 400 m T53. At the 2013 Championships in Lyon, France, he won bronze medals in the Men's 800 m and 1500 m T53 events. He was selected to compete at the 2015 Championships in Doha but withdrew from the competition.

== Personal ==
Colman grew up in Geelong and attended Geelong College. Colman stated that “I did every single sport I could growing up, I think that’s why I’ve become an athlete because my school was so inclusive and supportive of the community and me being involved. It really did show me back then that yeah, I’m in a wheelchair but I can still be involved in nearly any sport and opportunities.”

Colman is the first wheelchair AFL goal umpire in the Geelong League, debuting in 2007. In 2009, he completed a Bachelor of Commerce studies at Deakin University.

He received a Deakin Young Alumni of the Year Award in 2012 in recognition of his outstanding sporting achievements, particularly in wheelchair athletics.

Colman was made a Member of the Order of Australia (AM) in the 2014 Queen's Birthday Honours for "significant service to sport as a gold medallist at the London 2012 Paralympic Games, and to the community".

He is currently working with junior athletes to develop the next generation of Paralympic champions. In the summer he coaches international senior athletes in Geelong.

Colman became the first person in a wheelchair to complete the Death Road in Bolivia, a 64-kilometre track which descends 3500 metres. Colman stated 'Death Road pushed me to my limits but it was an incredible experience to say the least.'

In 2020, Colman is an active Geelong ambassador.
