= Lachlan Jones =

Australian Paralympic athlete

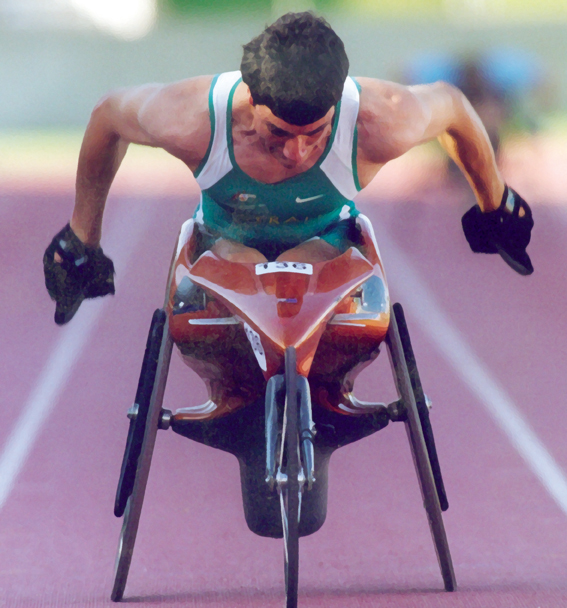

Personal information
- Full name: Lachlan Stuart Jones
- Nationality: Australia
- Born: 4 March 1977 (age 49) Melbourne
Medal record
Athletics
Paralympic Games
| Gold medal – first place | 1996 Atlanta | Men's 100 m T32 |
IPC Athletics World Championships
| Gold medal – first place | 1998 Birmingham | Men's 200 m T33 |
| Gold medal – first place | 1998 Birmingham | Men's 400 m T33 |
| Silver medal – second place | 1998 Birmingham | Men's 100 m T33 |

Lachlan Stuart Jones, OAM (born 4 March 1977) is a former Australian Paralympic athlete. He was born in Melbourne, and has cerebral palsy. At the 1996 Atlanta Games, he won a gold medal in the Men's 100 m T32 event with a world record time of 0:19.90, for which he received a Medal of the Order of Australia. He also participated without winning any medals at the 2000 Sydney and 2004 Athens Games. In 2000, he received an Australian Sports Medal.
