= Charles Tolle =

French Paralympic athlete

Medal record

Men's para athletics

Representing France

Paralympic Games
Gold medal – first place	1996 Atlanta	4x400 metre relay - T52-53
Gold medal – first place	2000 Sydney	4x400 metre relay - T54
Bronze medal – third place	2000 Sydney	400 metres - T53

Charles Tolle is a paralympic athlete from France competing mainly in category T53 wheelchair racing events.

Charles has competed in 3 Paralympics, winning 3 medals in two games. He first competed in the 1996 Summer Paralympics where he competed in the 200m and 400m, and won a gold medal as part of the French 4 × 400 m relay team. In the 2000 Summer Paralympics he won a bronze in the individual 400m as well as helping the French relay team defend there Gold medal and competing in the 200m and marathon. His third appearance proved to be his least successful, competing in the 2004 Summer Paralympics he competed in the 200m, 400m and 800m without winning a medal.
