= Peth Rungsri =

Thai Paralympic sprinter

Personal information
- Born: 2 May 1982 (age 44)

Sport
- Sport: Paralympic athletics
Medal record
Paralympic athletics
Representing Thailand
Paralympic Games
| Bronze medal – third place | 2004 Athens | 200m T52 |
World Championships
| Gold medal – first place | 2006 Assen | 400m T52 |
| Bronze medal – third place | 2006 Assen | 800m T52 |
Asian Para Games
| Gold medal – first place | 2014 Incheon | 100m T52 |
| Bronze medal – third place | 2014 Incheon | 400m T52 |
| Bronze medal – third place | 2018 Jakarta | 200m T51/52 |
| Bronze medal – third place | 2018 Jakarta | 400m T52 |

Peth Rungsri (born 2 May 1982) is a Paralympian athlete from Thailand competing mainly in category T52 sprint events.

He competed in the 2004 Summer Paralympics in Athens, Greece. There he finished eighth in the men's 100 metres T52, finished fifth in the men's 200 metres T52, finished seventh in the men's 400 metres T52 and finished eighth in the men's 800 metres T52. He also competed at the 2008 Summer Paralympics in Beijing, China. There he won a bronze medal in the men's 200 metres T52, finished sixth in the men's 100 metres T52, finished fifth in the men's 400 metres T52 and finished eighth in the men's 800 metres T52. He won the 100m T52 at the 2014 Asian Para Games.
