= Adam Bleakney =

American Paralympic athlete

Medal record

Track and field (athletics)

Representing United States

Paralympic Games
Silver medal – second place	2004 Athens	800 metres - T53

Adam Bleakney is a paralympic athlete from the United States competing mainly in category T53 wheelchair racing events.

Adam has competed in numerous events at three Paralympics. He has competed at events from 100m to marathon in the 2000, 2004 and 2008 Summer Paralympics. He won his sole medal in the 2004 800m where he finished second.
