= Josh George =

American Paralympic athlete

Personal information
- Full name: Joshua George
- Born: March 18, 1984 (age 42) Herndon, Virginia, U.S.
- Height: 4 ft 10 in (147 cm)

Sport
- Sport: Track and field
- Disability class: T53
Medal record
Men's para-athletics
Representing United States
Paralympic Games
Gold medal – first place	2008 Beijing	100m - T53
Silver medal – second place	2008 Beijing	800m - T53
Bronze medal – third place	2004 Athens	100m - T53
Bronze medal – third place	2004 Athens	400m - T53

Joshua George (born March 18, 1984) is a Paralympian athlete from the United States competing in category T53 events ranging from sprints to the marathon.

At the 2004 Summer Paralympics, George participated in seven events, winning bronze medals in the 100 and 400 metre races. He competed in the 2008 Summer Paralympics in Beijing, China. There he won a gold medal in the men's 100 metres - T53 event, a silver medal in the men's 800 metres - T53 event, went out in the semi-finals of the men's 1500 metres - T53 event, finished fourth in the men's 200 metres - T53 event, went out in the first round of the men's 400 metres - T53 event, went out in the first round of the men's 4 x 400 metre relay - T53 event and finished sixteenth in the men's Marathon - T54 event

In November 2014, George traveled to Brazil as a SportsUnited Sports Envoy for the U.S. Department of State. In this function, he worked with Allyson Felix to conduct clinics, speeches and other events for 510 youth, many of whom had disabilities or came from marginalized communities. The program was designed to remove barriers and create activities that benefit audiences with and without disabilities, whilst speaking with a young, at-risk public about important life and sports values, such as respect, discipline and overcoming adversity.
