= Tomoya Ito =

Japanese Paralympic athlete

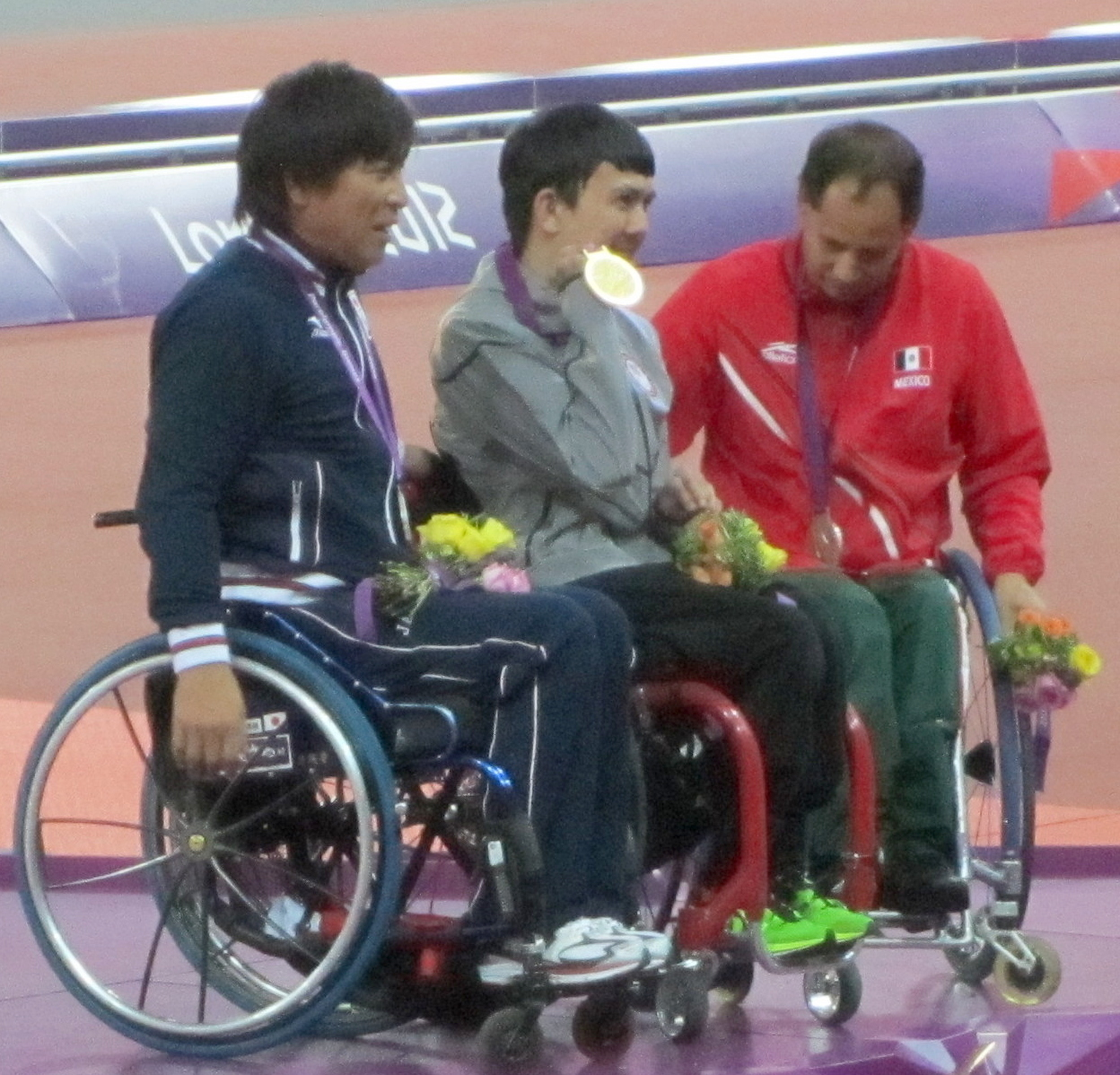
- Ito (left) with his silver medal at the 2012 Paralympics

Personal information
- Born: 16 August 1963 (age 62) Mie Prefecture, Japan

Sport
- Sport: Paralympic athletics
- Disability class: T52
Medal record
Representing Japan
Paralympic Games
Gold medal – first place	2008 Beijing	400m T52
Gold medal – first place	2008 Beijing	800m T52
Silver medal – second place	2012 London	200m T52
Silver medal – second place	2012 London	400m T52
Silver medal – second place	2012 London	800m T52
Bronze medal – third place	2024 Paris	400m T52
World Championships
Gold medal – first place	2011 Christchurch	400m T52
Gold medal – first place	2011 Christchurch	800m T52
Silver medal – second place	2019 Dubai	400m T52
Bronze medal – third place	2006 Assen	1500m T52
Bronze medal – third place	2006 Assen	5000m T52
Bronze medal – third place	2006 Assen	Marathon T52
Bronze medal – third place	2011 Christchurch	200m T52
Bronze medal – third place	2019 Dubai	100m T52
Bronze medal – third place	2019 Dubai	1500m T52
Bronze medal – third place	2025 New Delhi	400m T52
Asian Para Games
Gold medal – first place	2018 Jakarta	200m T51/52
Silver medal – second place	2018 Jakarta	100m T52
Silver medal – second place	2018 Jakarta	400m T52

Tomoya Ito (伊藤 智也, Itō Tomoya) (born 16 August 1963) is a professional Japanese wheelchair Paralympic athlete from Suzuka, Mie, Japan, and a former entrepreneur.

== Biography ==
- 1998 During a business trip, he fell down and was diagnosed with multiple sclerosis. During his first treatment, he placed the order for a racing wheelchair by mistake. This mistake triggered him to start competing.
- 2002 He founded a non-profit organization, "Gold Athlete" to support athletes of disabled sports.
- 2004 Attended the 2004 Summer Paralympics, in Athens
- 2005 Became a professional athlete. He was enlisted to the Hall of Fame at The Museum of Marathon in Greece. He was the first Paralympic athlete to be enlisted.
- 2008 won two gold medals at 2008 Summer Paralympics in Beijing. He also marked the world record at Men's T52 800m round 1.

Biography References

- Kondo, Mikio (2008-09-13). "Shisso 'Ikiru Jikkan', Rikujo Danshi 400m Shinkiroku 'Kin' no Ito Tomoya". Yomiuri Shimbun.
- Ito, Tomoya (2005-01-27). Ichibyo demo. Ise Shimbun Sha. ISBN 978-4-900457-91-1.
- Mie TV "Tottemo Waku-doki" on 6, October, 2008
- Cable Net Suzuka "Ito Tomoya Beijing Paralympic Special Program" in Oct 2008

== Records ==
- 400m T52 57.25 Japan National Record
- 800m T52 1:52.31 World Record
- Marathon T52 1:52:36

As of December 2008
