= Choke Yasuoka =

Japanese Paralympic athlete

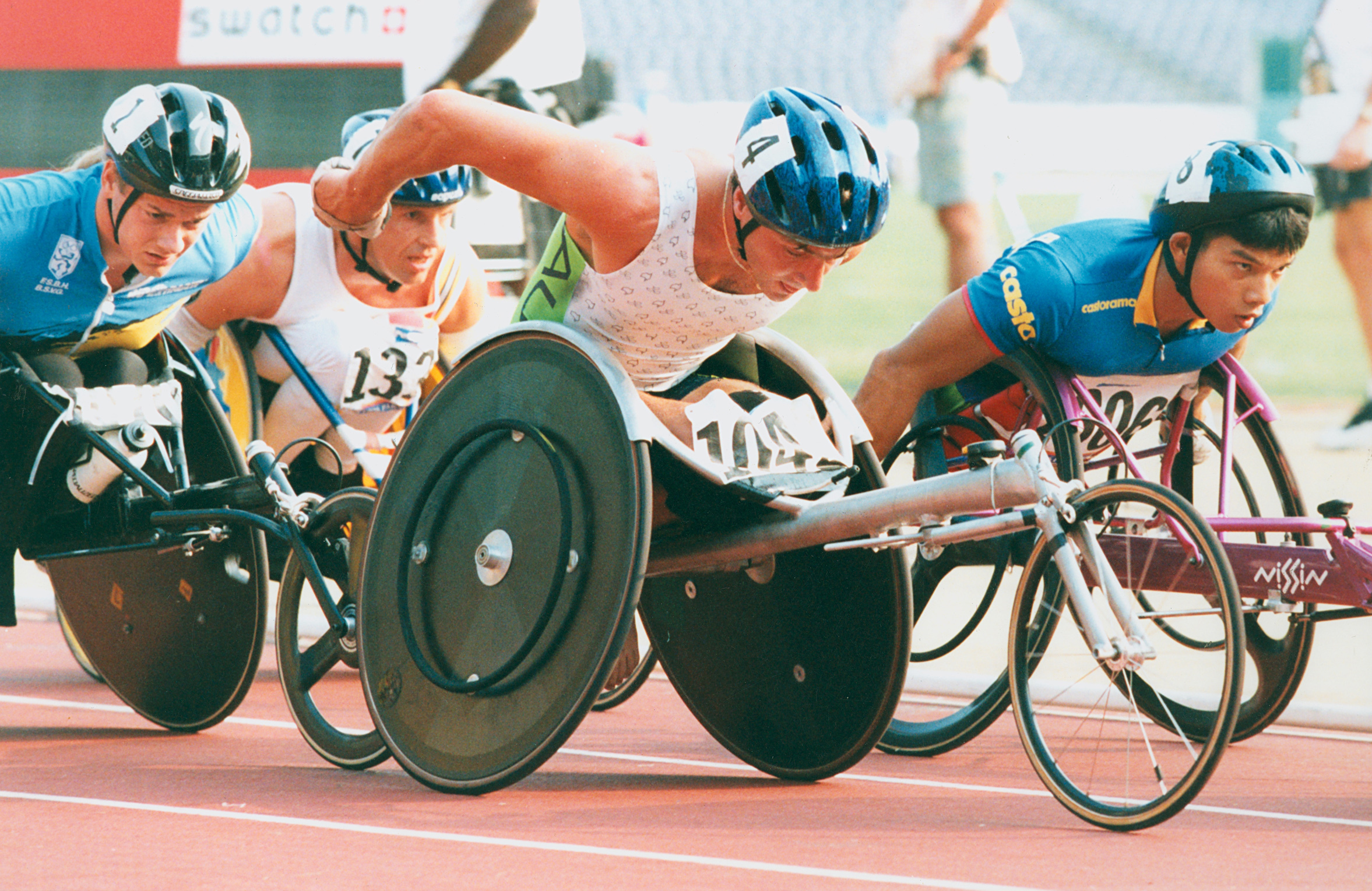
- Choke Yasuoka (far right) at the 1996 Paralympics

Personal information
- Nationality: Thailand
- Born: January 18, 1973 (age 53) Pran Buri District, Thailand

Sport
- Sport: Wheelchair racing

Choke Yasuoka (Japanese: 安岡チョーク, born January 18, 1973, in Pran Buri District, Thailand) is a wheelchair racer, who competes at Olympic level for Japan. At the 2004 Olympic Games, he finished 6th in the demonstration sport of Men's 1500m wheelchair. He also participated in the 2004 Summer Paralympics, winning silver in the 400 metres, gold in the 800 metres, and bronze in the 4×400 metre relay. He has also competed in wheelchair marathon races, including the Boston Marathon and the Ōita Marathon.
