= Jun Hiromichi =

Japanese Paralympic athlete

Medal record

Paralympic athletics

Representing Japan

Paralympic Games
Silver medal – second place	2000 Sydney	800 metres - T53
Bronze medal – third place	2004 Athens	800 metres - T53

Jun Hiromichi (廣道 純, Hiromichi Jun; born December 21, 1973) is a Paralympian athlete from Japan competing mainly in category T53 wheelchair racing events.

Jun competed at the 2000, 2004 and 2008 Summer Paralympics where like many wheelchair racers he competed in events as diverse as the 200m and marathon but both of his medals, a silver in 2000 and bronze in 2004, came in the 800m.
