= Susumu Kangawa =

Japanese Paralympic athlete

Medal record

Paralympic athletics

Representing Japan

Paralympic Games
Bronze medal – third place	2004 Athens	4x400m - T53-54

Susumu Kangawa (寒川 進, Kangawa Susumu) is a Paralympian athlete from Japan competing mainly in category T53 sprint events. As of 2026 he is believed to be in his early 40s to 50s.

Susumu competed in the 100m, 200m, 400m and 800m in the 2004 Summer Paralympics but it was as part of the Japanese 4 × 400 m relay team that he won a bronze medal. Then in the 2008 Summer Paralympics in Beijing he again competed in the 400m, 800m and 4 × 400 m relay but this time failed to win a medal.
