= Taekwondo at the 2024 Summer Paralympics – Women's +65 kg =

Taekwondo – Women's +65 kg K44 at the XVII Paralympic Games
- Venue: Grand Palais, Paris
- Date: 31 August 2024
- Competitors: 13 from 13 nations

Medalists
| 1st place, gold medalist(s) | | Amy Truesdale | Great Britain |
| 2nd place, silver medalist(s) | | Guljonoy Naimova | Uzbekistan |
| 3rd place, bronze medalist(s) | | Eleni Papastamatopoulou | Greece |
| 3rd place, bronze medalist(s) | | Rajae Akermach | Morocco |

The women's +65 kg taekwondo competition at the 2024 Summer Paralympics was held on 31 August 2024 at the Grand Palais, Paris, and 13 athletes took part in it.

In this weight class, there is a single preliminary bout before the round of 16.

== Results ==
Bracket

Preliminary Round

30 August, South Paris Arena

| Manega Tapari (PNG) | 16 |
| Martha Kimoto (CAF) | 10 |

Round of 16

Quarter-finals

Semi-finals

Gold medal match

30 August, South Paris Arena

Eleni Papastamatopoulou (GRE)
5

30 August, South Paris Arena

Guljonoy Naimova (UZB)
12

Patricia Kyerenaa (GHA)
7

30 August, South Paris Arena

Eleni Papastamatopoulou (GRE)
24

Guljonoy Naimova (UZB)
9

30 August, South Paris Arena

Débora Menezes (BRA)
3

Dalia Santiago Moreno (ESP)
35

30 August, South Paris Arena

Manega Tapari (PNG)
6

Dalia Santiago Moreno (ESP)
15

Débora Menezes (BRA)
17

30 August, South Paris Arena

Guljonoy Naimova (UZB)
2

Amy Truesdale (GBR)
8

30 August, South Paris Arena

Jelena Rašić (SRB)
1

30 August, South Paris Arena

Fernanda Vargas (MEX)
4

Lidia Montes de Oca (CUB)
4

30 August, South Paris Arena

Jelena Rašić (SRB)
13

Fernanda Vargas (MEX)
13

30 August, South Paris Arena

Amy Truesdale (GBR)
26

Rajae Akermach (MAR)
28

30 August, South Paris Arena

Jiraporn Wongsuwan (THA)
4

Rajae Akermach (MAR)
9

Amy Truesdale (GBR)
30

Repechage

Repechage match
30 August, South Paris Arena
Eleni Papastamatopoulou (GRE) | 11
Dalia Santiago Moreno (ESP) | 7

Bronze medal match
30 August, South Paris Arena
Eleni Papastamatopoulou (GRE) | 36
Fernanda Vargas (MEX) | 9

Repechage match
30 August, South Paris Arena
Rajae Akermach (MAR) | 12
Jelena Rašić (SRB) | 0

Bronze medal match
30 August, South Paris Arena
Rajae Akermach (MAR) | 24
Débora Menezes (BRA) | 15
