= Oceania Para-Badminton Championships =

Badminton championships

- Most recent season or competition: #2022 Melbourne
- Founder: Para Badminton World Federation (now part of the BWF)
- First season: 2018

The Oceania Para-Badminton Championships is a tournament organized by the Para Badminton World Federation (PBWF) which has now merged with the BWF. This tournament is hosted to crown the best para-badminton players in Oceania.

The inaugural edition of the tournament was hosted in Geelong, Australia in 2018.

== Championships ==
=== Individual championships ===
The table below states all the host cities (and their countries) of the Oceanian Championships.

Year	Number	Host city	Host country	Events
2018	1	Geelong	Australia	7
2020	2	Ballarat	Australia	8
2022	3	Melbourne	Australia	9
2025	4	Bendigo	Australia	12
2027	5	Bendigo	Australia	

== All-time medal table ==
As of 2022.

Rank	Nation	Gold	Silver	Bronze	Total
1	Australia (AUS)	16.5	21	31	68.5
2	New Zealand (NZL)	6.5	2	6	14.5
3	Papua New Guinea (PNG)	0	1	2	3
4	Fiji (FIJ)	0	0	1	1
Totals (4 entries)		23	24	40	87

== Past winners ==
=== 2018 Geelong ===
Event	Gold	Silver	Bronze
Men's singles WH1	(Australia) Richard John Davis	(Australia) Duke Trench-Thiedeman	(Australia) Daniel O'Neil
Men's singles WH2	(Australia) Grant Manzoney	(Australia) Richard Joseph Engles	(New Zealand) Benjamin Hasselman
Men's singles SL3–SL4	(New Zealand) Corrie Keith Robinson	(Australia) Phonexay Kinnavong	(New Zealand) Guy Harrison
Singles SH6	(Australia) Luke Missen	(Australia) Kobie Jane Donovan	(Fiji) Iosefo Rakesa
Men's doubles WH1–WH2	(Australia) Richard John Davis (Australia) Grant Manzoney	(Australia) Richard Joseph Engles (Australia) Pradeep Hewavitharana	(Australia) Duke Trench-Thiedeman (Australia) Douglas Youlten
Women's singles SL3–SL4	(Australia) Caitlin Dransfield	(Australia) Anu Francis	(Australia) Celine Vinot
Mixed doubles SL3–SU5	(New Zealand) Corrie Keith Robinson (Australia) Caitlin Dransfield	(Australia) Phonexay Kinnavong (Australia) Anu Francis	(Australia) Hayden Bognar (Australia) Celine Vinot

=== 2020 Ballarat ===
Event	Gold	Silver	Bronze
Singles WH1	(Australia) Lochan Cowper	(Australia) Richard John Davis	(Australia) Grant Leonard
Singles WH1	(Australia) Lochan Cowper	(Australia) Richard John Davis	(Australia) Duke Trench-Thiedeman
Men's singles WH2	(Australia) Grant Manzoney	(Australia) Qambar Ali Akhteyari	(Australia) Brian Fitzpatrick
Men's singles WH2	(Australia) Grant Manzoney	(Australia) Qambar Ali Akhteyari	(Australia) Benjamin Hasselman
Men's singles SL3–SU5	(New Zealand) Thomas Denesfield Slade	(New Zealand) Devon Rogers	(New Zealand) Oliver Kiran Linton
Men's singles SL3–SU5	(New Zealand) Thomas Denesfield Slade	(New Zealand) Devon Rogers	(New Zealand) Corrie Keith Robinson
Singles SH6	(Australia) Luke Missen	(Papua New Guinea) David Joe Kaniku	(Australia) Angelina Melki
Singles SH6	(Australia) Luke Missen	(Papua New Guinea) David Joe Kaniku	(Australia) Anthony Koedyk
Doubles WH1–WH2	(Australia) Lochan Cowper (Australia) Grant Manzoney	(Australia) Guy Harrison (Australia) Thomas Denesfield Slade	(Australia) Jerome Bunge (Australia) Rod Rantall
Doubles WH1–WH2	(Australia) Lochan Cowper (Australia) Grant Manzoney	(Australia) Guy Harrison (Australia) Thomas Denesfield Slade	(Australia) Hayden Bognar (Australia) Adam Torey-Toth
Doubles SL3–SU5	(New Zealand) Corrie Keith Robinson (New Zealand) Devon Rogers	(New Zealand) Guy Harrison (New Zealand) Thomas Denesfield Slade	(Papua New Guinea) Jerome Bunge (Australia) Rod Rantall
Doubles SL3–SU5	(New Zealand) Corrie Keith Robinson (New Zealand) Devon Rogers	(New Zealand) Guy Harrison (New Zealand) Thomas Denesfield Slade	(Australia) Hayden Bognar (Australia) Adam Torey-Toth
Women's singles SL3–SU5	(New Zealand) Carrie Joanne Wilson	(Australia) Doung Kim Chou	(Australia) Celine Vinot
Women's singles SL3–SU5	(New Zealand) Carrie Joanne Wilson	(Australia) Doung Kim Chou	(Australia) Zashka Gunson
Mixed doubles SL3–SU5	(New Zealand) Corrie Keith Robinson (New Zealand) Carrie Joanne Wilson	(Australia) Rod Rantall (Australia) Celine Vinot	(Australia) Adam Torey-Toth (Australia) Zashka Gunson
Mixed doubles SL3–SU5	(New Zealand) Corrie Keith Robinson (New Zealand) Carrie Joanne Wilson	(Australia) Rod Rantall (Australia) Celine Vinot	(Papua New Guinea) Danny Ten (Australia) Amonrat Jamporn

=== 2022 Melbourne ===
Melbourne was selected to host the tournament in 2022.

Event	Gold	Silver	Bronze
Men's singles WH1	(Australia) Lochan Cowper	(Australia) Nang Nguyen Van	(Australia) Richard John Davis
Men's singles WH1	(Australia) Lochan Cowper	(Australia) Nang Nguyen Van	(Australia) Samir Ishani
Men's singles WH2	(Australia) Grant Manzoney	(Australia) Qambar Ali Akhteyari	(Australia) Douglas Youlten
Men's singles WH2	(Australia) Grant Manzoney	(Australia) Qambar Ali Akhteyari	(New Zealand) Eamon Wood
Men's singles SL3–SU5	(Australia) Kenneth Adlawan	(Australia) Phonexay Kinnavong	(Papua New Guinea) Jerome Bunge
Men's singles SL3–SU5	(Australia) Kenneth Adlawan	(Australia) Phonexay Kinnavong	(New Zealand) Oliver Kiran Linton
Men's doubles WH1–WH2	(Australia) Lochan Cowper (Australia) Grant Manzoney	(Australia) Qambar Ali Akhteyari (Australia) Richard John Davis	(Australia) Samir Ishani (Australia) Grant Leonard
Men's doubles WH1–WH2	(Australia) Lochan Cowper (Australia) Grant Manzoney	(Australia) Qambar Ali Akhteyari (Australia) Richard John Davis	(Australia) Dominic Monypenny (Australia) Nang Nguyen Van
Doubles SL3–SU5	(Australia) Doung Kim Chou (Australia) Caitlin Dransfield	(Australia) Kenneth Adlawan (Australia) Phonexay Kinnavong	(Australia) Zashka Gunson (Australia) Celine Aurelie Vinot
Doubles SL3–SU5	(Australia) Doung Kim Chou (Australia) Caitlin Dransfield	(Australia) Kenneth Adlawan (Australia) Phonexay Kinnavong	(New Zealand) Carrie Joanne Wilson (Australia) Amonrat Jamporn
Women's singles WH1–WH2	(Australia) Mischa Ginns	(New Zealand) Carrie Joanne Wilson	(Australia) Brooke Holt
Women's singles WH1–WH2	(Australia) Mischa Ginns	(New Zealand) Carrie Joanne Wilson	(Australia) Bree Mellberg
Women's singles SL4–SU5	(Australia) Caitlin Dransfield	(Australia) Janine Watson	(Australia) Zashka Gunson
Women's singles SL4–SU5	(Australia) Caitlin Dransfield	(Australia) Janine Watson	(Australia) Celine Vinot
Women's doubles WH1–WH2	(Australia) Mischa Ginns (Australia) Bree Mellberg	(Australia) Fiona Sing (Australia) Janine Watson	(Australia) Brooke Holt (New Zealand) Marinda Jones
Mixed doubles WH1–WH2	(Australia) Richard John Davis (Australia) Mischa Ginns	(Australia) Grant Manzoney (Australia) Bree Mellberg	(Australia) Samir Ishani (Australia) Janine Watson
Mixed doubles WH1–WH2	(Australia) Richard John Davis (Australia) Mischa Ginns	(Australia) Grant Manzoney (Australia) Bree Mellberg	(Australia) Douglas Youlten (Australia) Sarah Cheshire
Mixed doubles SL3–SU5	(New Zealand) Oliver Kiran Linton (New Zealand) Carrie Joanne Wilson	(Australia) Kenneth Adlawan (Australia) Caitlin Dransfield	(Australia) Phonexay Kinnavong (Australia) Amonrat Jamporn
Mixed doubles SL3–SU5	(New Zealand) Oliver Kiran Linton (New Zealand) Carrie Joanne Wilson	(Australia) Kenneth Adlawan (Australia) Caitlin Dransfield	(Australia) Arnold Razon (Australia) Celine Vinot

== 2025 Bendigo ==
Event	Gold	Silver	Bronze
Men's singles WH1	(Australia) Lochan Cowper	(Australia) Martyn Ford	(New Zealand) Justin Cameron
Men's singles WH1	(Australia) Lochan Cowper	(Australia) Martyn Ford	(Australia) Nang Van Nguyen
Men's singles WH2	(Australia) Qambar Ali Akhteyari	(Australia) Grant Manzoney	(New Zealand) Glenn Barnes
Men's singles SL3	(New Zealand) Rishikesh Venu	(Australia) Remi Foster	No bronze medalist
Men's singles SL4–SU5	(Australia) Lachlan Boulton	(New Zealand) Thomas Denesfield Slade	(Australia) Michael Simpkins
Men's singles SL4–SU5	(Australia) Lachlan Boulton	(New Zealand) Thomas Denesfield Slade	(Australia) Brandon Ka Nam Poon
Men's singles SH6	(Papua New Guinea) David Joe Kaniku	(Papua New Guinea) Issac Ume	No bronze medalist
Men's doubles WH1–WH2	(Australia) Qambar Ali Akhteyari (Australia) Lochan Cowper	(Australia) Martyn Ford (Australia) Grant Manzoney	(Australia) Ashok Bondili (Australia) Adam Georgelin
Men's doubles WH1–WH2	(Australia) Qambar Ali Akhteyari (Australia) Lochan Cowper	(Australia) Martyn Ford (Australia) Grant Manzoney	(Australia) Hayden Braun (Australia) Nang Van Nguyen
Men's doubles SL3–SU5	(Australia) Michael Simpkins (New Zealand) Thomas Denesfield Slade	(Australia) Lachlan Boulton (Australia) Remi Foster	(Australia) Hayden Bognar (Australia) Brandon Ka Nam Poon
Men's doubles SL3–SU5	(Australia) Michael Simpkins (New Zealand) Thomas Denesfield Slade	(Australia) Lachlan Boulton (Australia) Remi Foster	(New Zealand) Andrew Fairweather (New Zealand) Rishikesh Venu
Women's singles SL4–SU5	(New Zealand) Anna Hika	(New Zealand) Carrie Wilson	(New Zealand) Maia Read
Women's singles SH6	(Vanuatu) Jacklynda Molidu	(New Zealand) Amy Dunn	No bronze medalist
Women's doubles SL3–SU5	(Australia) Caitlin Dransfield (Australia) Amonrat Jamporn	(Papua New Guinea) Regina Edward (Papua New Guinea) Manega Tapari	(Fiji) Ilisapeci Rokosauturanga (Fiji) Selina Seau
Mixed doubles WH1–WH2	(Australia) Lochan Cowper (Australia) Mischa Ginns	(Australia) Qambar Ali Akhteyari (Australia) Bree Wright	(Australia) Grant Manzoney (Australia) Macka Mackenzie
Mixed doubles SL3–SU5	(New Zealand) Thomas Denesfield Slade (Papua New Guinea) Regina Edward	(Australia) Brandon Ka Nam Poon (New Zealand) Carrie Wilson	(Australia) Michael Simpkins (Australia) Celine Vinot
Mixed doubles SL3–SU5	(New Zealand) Thomas Denesfield Slade (Papua New Guinea) Regina Edward	(Australia) Brandon Ka Nam Poon (New Zealand) Carrie Wilson	(Australia) Lachlan Boulton (Australia) Amonrat Jamporn

== See also ==
- Oceania Badminton Championships
