= Grant Manzoney =

Australian para badminton player

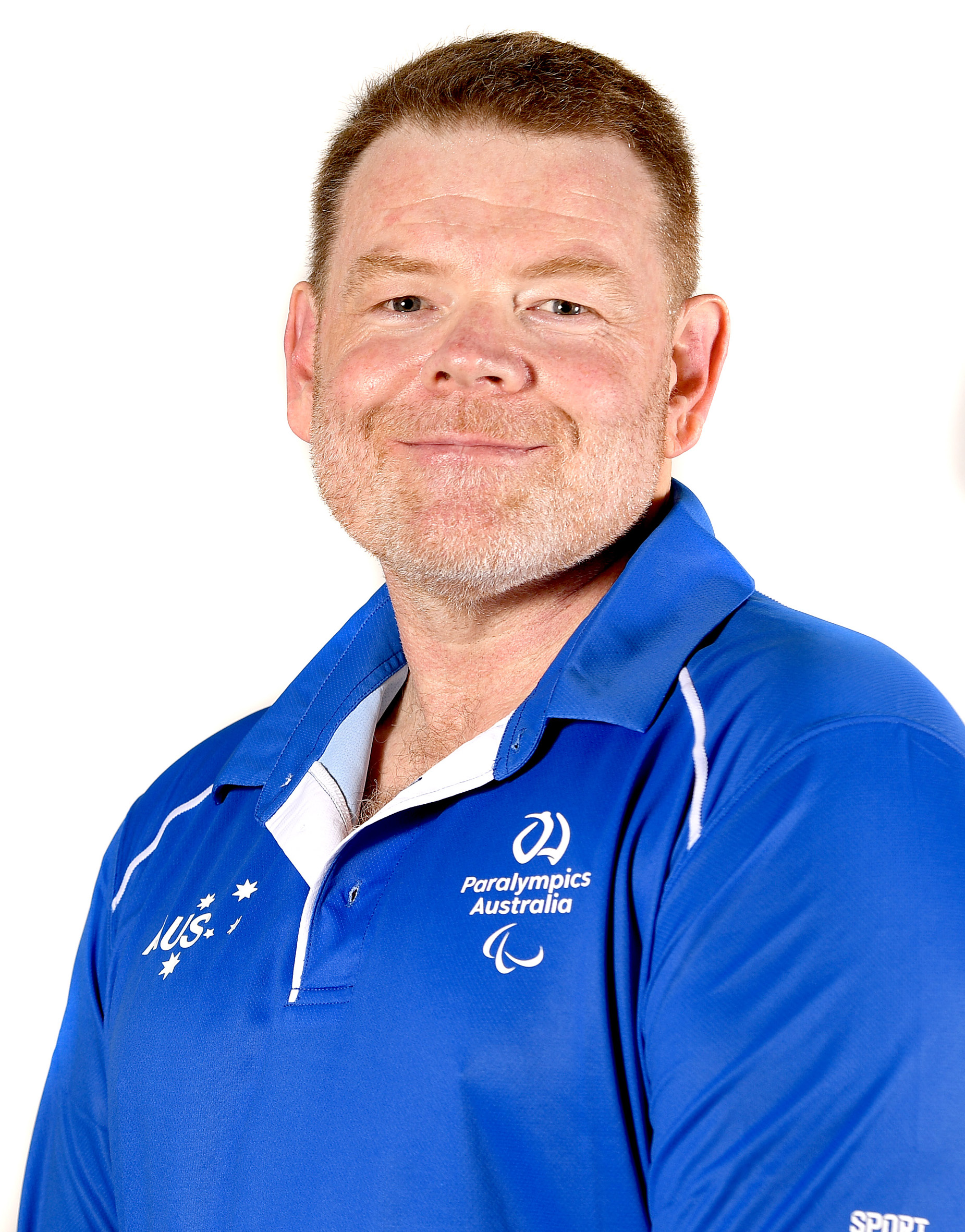
- Grant Manzoney in 2019

Personal information
- Born: 16 December 1969 (age 56) Swan View, Australia

Sport
- Country: Australia
- Sport: Badminton
- Coached by: Mark Cunningham

Men's singles WH2 Men's doubles WH1–WH2 Mixed doubles WH1–WH2
- Highest ranking: 15 (MS 22 September 2022); 31 (MD with Lochan Cowper 1 August 2022); 32 (XD with Bree Mellberg 8 November 2022)
- Current ranking: 16 (MS); 34 (MD with Lochan Cowper); 32 (XD with Bree Mellberg) (15 November 2022)
- BWF profile
Medal record
Men's para badminton
Representing Australia
Oceania Championships
Gold medal – first place	2018 Geelong	Men's singles
Gold medal – first place	2018 Geelong	Men's doubles
Gold medal – first place	2020 Ballarat	Men's singles
Gold medal – first place	2022 Melbourne	Men's singles
Gold medal – first place	2022 Melbourne	Men's doubles
Silver medal – second place	2022 Melbourne	Mixed doubles
Bronze medal – third place	2023 Perth	Mixed doubles

Grant Manzoney (born 16 December 1969) is an Australian para badminton player. He competed at the 2020 Summer Paralympics where badminton made its Paralympics debut.

== Personal ==
Manzoney was born on 16 December 1969 with congenital deformity in both legs. His right leg is missing and fibular hemimelia in his left leg causing severe deformity of his left foot and ankle. Surgery at an early age has allowed him to walk on his left foot instead of amputation. He has a prosthetic right leg since childhood. He attended Swan View Senior High School.

== Badminton ==
After dabbling in wheelchair basketball, he discovered para-badminton in 2016 as part of Wheelchair Sports held a 'come and try day'. He is classified WH2.He has earned number one rankings in Oceania and Australia in singles and doubles in his class.

He participated at the 2019 BWF Para-Badminton World Championships in Basel, where he won one match and lost two and did not reach the knockout stage.

In 2020, he defended his Oceania Para Badminton Championships Men's WH2 title.

At the 2020 Tokyo Paralympics, he competed in the men's singles WH2. His first opponent in the Group Stage was Kim Kjung-hoon from Korea. He lost 2–0. He then competed against Kim Jung-Jun also from Korea. Here he also lost 2–0. Manzoney therefore did not make the quarterfinals.

His coach in Perth is Mark Cunningham.

== Achievements ==
=== Oceania Championships ===
Men's singles WH2

Year	Venue	Opponent	Score	Result
2018 (Note: This tournament uses a round robin system.)	Leisuretime Sports Precinct, Geelong, Australia	(Australia) Douglas Youlten	21–3, 21–8	Gold
2018	Leisuretime Sports Precinct, Geelong, Australia	(New Zealand) Benjamin Hasselman	21–5, 21–10	Gold
2018	Leisuretime Sports Precinct, Geelong, Australia	(Australia) Richard Joseph Engles	21–11, 21–11	Gold
2018	Leisuretime Sports Precinct, Geelong, Australia	(Australia) Michael Colin McDonald	21–0, 21–5	Gold
2020	Ken Kay Badminton Stadium, Ballarat, Australia	(Australia) Qambar Ali Akhteyari	21–10, 21–7	Gold
2022	Melbourne Sports and Aquatic Centre, Melbourne, Australia	(Australia) Douglas Youlten	21–4, 21–3	Gold
2022	Melbourne Sports and Aquatic Centre, Melbourne, Australia	(Australia) Eamon Wood	21–4, 21–1	Gold
2022	Melbourne Sports and Aquatic Centre, Melbourne, Australia	(Australia) Qambar Ali Akhteyari	21–10, 21–9	Gold

Men's doubles WH1–WH2

Year	Venue	Partner	Opponent	Score	Result
2018	Leisuretime Sports Precinct, Geelong, Australia	(Australia) Richard John Davis	(Australia) Duke Trench-Thiedeman (Australia) Douglas Youlten	21–7, 21–6	Gold
2018	Leisuretime Sports Precinct, Geelong, Australia	(Australia) Richard John Davis	(Australia) Michael Colin McDonald (Australia) Daniel O'Neil	21–8, 21–4	Gold
2018	Leisuretime Sports Precinct, Geelong, Australia	(Australia) Richard John Davis	(Australia) Richard Joseph Engles (Australia) Pradeep Hewavitharana	21–13, 21–14	Gold
2022	Melbourne Sports and Aquatic Centre, Melbourne, Australia	(Australia) Lochan Cowper	(Australia) Qambar Ali Akhteyari (Australia) Richard John Davis	21–11, 21–9	Gold

Mixed doubles WH1–WH2

Year	Venue	Partner	Opponent	Score	Result
2022	Melbourne Sports and Aquatic Centre, Melbourne, Australia	(Australia) Bree Mellberg	(Australia) Richard John Davis (Australia) Mischa Ginns	18–21, 17–21	Silver
2023	Mandurah Aquatic and Recreation Centre, Perth, Australia	(Australia) Marinda Jones	(Australia) Lochan Cowper (Australia) Mischa Ginns	11–21, 7–21	Bronze
2023	Mandurah Aquatic and Recreation Centre, Perth, Australia	(Australia) Marinda Jones	(Australia) Nguyen Nan Vang (Australia) Janine Watson	14–21, 11–21	Bronze
2023	Mandurah Aquatic and Recreation Centre, Perth, Australia	(Australia) Marinda Jones	(Australia) Martyn Ford (Australia) Macka Mackenzie	21–12, 19–21, 21–17	Bronze
2023	Mandurah Aquatic and Recreation Centre, Perth, Australia	(Australia) Marinda Jones	(Australia) Qambar Ali Akhteyari (Australia) Catherine Gallagher	21–13, 21–7	Bronze
