= 2025 European Para Poomsae Championships =

2025 European Para Taekwondo Poomsae Championships

- Venue: UNIBET ARENA
- Location: (Estonia) Tallinn
- Dates: 16–17 April 2025
- Competitors: 76

Champion
- (United Kingdom) Great Britain

The 2025 European Para Poomsae Taekwondo Championships, the 2nd edition of the European Para Poomsae Championships, were held in Tallinn, Estonia, from 16 to 17 April 2025.

The event featured competitions in traditional poomsae. It is classified as a G4 event and was organized by the European Taekwondo Union and sanctioned by World Taekwondo.

== Medal table ==
* Host nation (Estonia)

Team Ranking
Rank	Nation	Gold	Silver	Bronze	Total
1	Great Britain	3	2	1	6
2	Croatia	2	1	4	7
3	Greece	2	1	0	3
4	Spain	1	2	0	3
5	Slovakia	1	0	2	3
6	Germany	1	0	0	1
6	Sweden	1	0	0	1
8	Turkey	0	4	3	7
9	Hungary	0	1	0	1
10	Italy	0	0	2	2
11	Belgium	0	0	1	1
11	Czech Republic	0	0	1	1
11	Poland	0	0	1	1
14	Netherlands	0	0	0	0
14	Norway	0	0	0	0
14	Serbia	0	0	0	0
Totals (16 entries)		11	11	15	37

== Medal summary: Recognized Poomsae ==
=== Men ===
Event	Gold	Silver	Bronze
P72	Oliver Hlavinka; Slovakia	Okan Hotun; Turkey	
P31	Domagoj Vujcic; Croatia		
P33	Jordi Aznar Oliveras; Spain	Peter Sopuch; Hungary	Leon Bozo Skravan; Croatia
P33	Jordi Aznar Oliveras; Spain	Peter Sopuch; Hungary	Filip Cimas; Croatia
P34	Arndt Mallepree; Germany	Borja Arroyo Ramos; Spain	
P53	Mahmut Arda Dogan; Turkey		
P21	Peter Sellwood; Great Britain	Berkay Cotaoglu; Turkey	Bradley Brockies; Great Britain
P21	Peter Sellwood; Great Britain	Berkay Cotaoglu; Turkey	Mariusz Maka; Poland
P22	Stipe Baric; Croatia	Roko Boduljak; Croatia	Eren Yilmat; Turkey
P22	Stipe Baric; Croatia	Roko Boduljak; Croatia	Kristijan Burusic; Croatia
P23	Nikolaos Kyprianos Milanos; Greece	Yusuf Eymen Otali; Turkey	Matteo Tosoni; Italy
P23	Nikolaos Kyprianos Milanos; Greece	Yusuf Eymen Otali; Turkey	Bruno Zivkovic; Croatia

=== Women ===
Event	Gold	Silver	Bronze
P72	Felicia Leventin; Sweden	Vahide Ziysan Hotun; Turkey	
P51	Dimitra Korokida; Greece		
P35	Yolanda Bodas Torrejon; Spain		
P34	Eleni Nestora; Greece	Jane Bedford; Great Britain	Dominika Kuchtova; Slovakia
P34	Eleni Nestora; Greece	Jane Bedford; Great Britain	Lenka Simeckova; Czech Republic
P32	Božica Hladik; Croatia		
P31	Ivona Budiscak; Croatia	Senada Halilcevic; Croatia	
P23	Iona Craig; Great Britain	Miriam Lowe-Ullah; Great Britain	Stefania Monaco; Italy
P22	Daniela Topic; Croatia	Maria Pavlou; Greece	Fatima Kevser Kideys; Turkey
P22	Daniela Topic; Croatia	Maria Pavlou; Greece	Adriana Beresova; Slovakia
P21	Summer Waheed; Great Britain	Athenea Garcia Morales; Spain	Gizem Bayrak; Turkey
P21	Summer Waheed; Great Britain	Athenea Garcia Morales; Spain	Melissa Engels; Belgium

=== Results ===
Day 1 | Day 2

== Related ==
Also in 2025, the European Poomsae Championships were held as a separate event in Tallinn from 16 to 17 April.

== See also ==
- 2023 European Poomsae Championships
- 2024 World Para Taekwondo Poomsae Championships
- 2025 European Poomsae Championships
- 2025 World Taekwondo Championships
