= Ghana at the 2008 Summer Paralympics =

- IPC code: GHA
- NPC: National Paralympic Committee of Ghana

in Beijing
- Competitors: 2 in 1 sport
- Flag bearer: Nkegbe Botsyo
- Medals: Gold 0 Silver 0 Bronze 0 Total 0

Summer Paralympics appearances (overview)
- 2004; 2008; 2012; 2016; 2020; 2024

Ghana sent a delegation to compete at the 2008 Summer Paralympics in Beijing, People's Republic of China.

== Athletics ==
Athlete	Class	Event	Heats		Final	
Athlete	Class	Event	Result	Rank	Result	Rank
Nkegbe Botsyo	T54	Men's 100m	15.55	19	did not advance	
Nkegbe Botsyo	T54	Men's 200m	26.48	16	did not advance	
Ajara Busonga Mohammed	T54	Women's 200m	DSQ		did not advance	
Ajara Busonga Mohammed	T54	Women's 1500m	3:46.56	12	did not advance	

== See also ==
- Ghana at the Paralympics
- Ghana at the 2008 Summer Olympics
