= Athletics at the 2008 Summer Paralympics – Men's 100 metres T54 =

The Men's 100m T54 had its First Round held on September 15 at 12:11 and its Final on September 16 at 17:50.

== Medalists ==
Gold	Leo-Pekka Tähti; Finland
Silver	Saichon Konjen; Thailand
Bronze	Supachai Koysub; Thailand

== Results ==
Place	Athlete	Round 1	Final
1	Leo-Pekka Tahti (FIN)	13.76 Q WR	13.81
2	Saichon Konjen (THA)	14.15 Q PR	14.04
3	Supachai Koysub (THA)	14.32 Q	14.22
4	Kai Zong (CHN)	14.25 Q	14.27
5	Kenny van Weeghel (NED)	14.36 Q	14.47
6	Jun Li (CHN)	14.41 Q	15.21
7	Mohammad Vahdani (UAE)	14.48 q	14.58
8	Ahmed Aouadi (TUN)	14.61 q	14.72
9	Richard Nicholson (AUS)	14.87	
10	Ji Zhao (CHN)	14.89	
11	Freddy Sandoval (MEX)	14.91	
12	Matthew Cameron (AUS)	14.92	
12	Erik Hightower (USA)	14.92	
14	Gonzalo Valdovinos (MEX)	14.94	
15	Marc Schuh (GER)	14.98	
16	Colin Mathieson (CAN)	15.15	
17	Fernando Sanchez (MEX)	15.23	
18	Ekkachai Janthon (THA)	15.48	
19	Nkegbe Botsyo (GHA)	15.55	
20	Mohamed Bouadda (ALG)	15.55	
21	Juan Valladares (VEN)	15.67	

== Footnotes ==
- Round 1 - Heat 1
- Round 1 - Heat 2
- Round 1 - Heat 3
- Final
