= Ghana at the 2004 Summer Paralympics =

- IPC code: GHA
- NPC: National Paralympic Committee of Ghana

in Athens
- Competitors: 3 in 2 sports
- Flag bearer: Nkegbe Botsyo
- Medals: Gold 0 Silver 0 Bronze 0 Total 0

Summer Paralympics appearances (overview)
- 2004; 2008; 2012; 2016; 2020; 2024

Ghana competed at the 2004 Summer Paralympics in Athens, Greece. Ghana made their Paralympic debut at the 2004 Games. The team included 3 athletes, 2 men and 1 women, but won no medals.

== Sports ==
=== Athletics ===
==== Men's track ====
Athlete	Class	Event	Heats		Semifinal		Final	
Athlete	Class	Event	Result	Rank	Result	Rank	Result	Rank
Nkegbe Botsyo	T54	100m	15.47	23	did not advance			
Nkegbe Botsyo	T54	200m	27.57	18	did not advance			

==== Women's track ====
Athlete	Class	Event	Heats		Semifinal		Final	
Athlete	Class	Event	Result	Rank	Result	Rank	Result	Rank
Ajara Mohammed	T54	Marathon	—				2:08:40	11

=== Powerlifting ===
Athlete	Event	Result	Rank
Alfred Adjetey Sowah	Men's 52kg	105.0	15

== See also ==
- Ghana at the Paralympics
- Ghana at the 2004 Summer Olympics
