= Mexico at the 2008 Summer Paralympics =

- IPC code: MEX
- NPC: Federacion Mexicana de Deporte

in Beijing
- Competitors: 68 in 7 sports
- Flag bearer: Saúl Mendoza
- Medals Ranked 14th: Gold 10 Silver 3 Bronze 7 Total 20

Summer Paralympics appearances (overview)
- 1972; 1976; 1980; 1984; 1988; 1992; 1996; 2000; 2004; 2008; 2012; 2016; 2020; 2024

Mexico sent a delegation to compete at the 2008 Summer Paralympics in Beijing. The country was represented by 68 athletes, a smaller delegation than at the previous Games.

== Medallists ==
Medal	Name	Sport	Event
Gold	Mario Santillán	Athletics	Men's marathon T46
Gold	Mauro Maximo de Jesus	Athletics	Men's shot put F53/54
Gold	Perla Bustamante	Athletics	Women's 100m T42
Gold	Eduardo Ávila Sanchez	Judo	Men's 73 kg
Gold	Amalia Pérez	Powerlifting	Women's -50 kg
Gold	Juan Ignacio Reyes	Swimming	Men's 50m backstroke S4
Gold	Pedro Rangel	Swimming	Men's 100m breaststroke SB5
Gold	Patricia Valle	Swimming	Women's 50m freestyle S3
Gold	Nely Miranda	Swimming	Women's 50m freestyle S4
Gold	Nely Miranda	Swimming	Women's 50m freestyle S4
Silver	María de los Ángeles Ortíz	Athletics	Women's shot put F58
Silver	Lenia Ruvalcaba	Judo	Women's 70 kg
Silver	Doramitzi González	Swimming	Women's 50m freestyle S6
Bronze	Mario Santillan	Athletics	Men's 5000m T46
Bronze	Luis Alberto Zepeda Félix	Athletics	Men's javelin throw F53/54
Bronze	Jeny Velazco	Athletics	Women's javelin throw F57-58
Bronze	Laura Cerero	Powerlifting	Women's -40 kg
Bronze	Perla Patricia Bárcenas	Powerlifting	Women's -82.5 kg
Bronze	Doramitzi González	Swimming	Women's 100m freestyle S6
Bronze	Patricia Valle	Swimming	Women's 150m individual medley SM4

== Sports ==
=== Athletics ===
==== Men's track ====
Athlete	Class	Event	Heats		Semifinal		Final	
Athlete	Class	Event	Result	Rank	Result	Rank	Result	Rank
Constantino Angeles	T11	1500m	4:30.50	12	did not advance			
Constantino Angeles	T11	5000m	—N/a				16:31.88	4
Moisés Beristain	T12	10000m	—N/a				33:17.07	6
Moisés Beristain	T12	Marathon	—N/a				2:38:17	8
Benjamín Cardozo	T37	100m	12.73	13	did not advance			
Aaron Gordian	T54	800m	1:40.45	17 Q	1:36.43	11	did not advance	
Aaron Gordian	T54	1500m	3:07.76	4 Q	3:09.72	15	did not advance	
Aaron Gordian	T54	5000m	10:14.41	2 Q	—N/a		10:25.49	7
Aaron Gordian	T54	Marathon	—N/a				1:23:20	4
Salvador Hernandez	T52	100m	—N/a				17.89	4
Salvador Hernandez	T52	200m	—N/a				33.34	7
Salvador Hernandez	T52	400m	1:06.20	11	did not advance			
Luis Herrera	T12	10000m	—N/a				DNF	
Luis Herrera	T12	Marathon	—N/a				2:38:50	9
Nicolas Ledesma	T11	1500m	4:31.08	13	did not advance			
Saúl Mendoza	T54	800m	1:37.40	4 Q	1:40.36	7 Q	1:38.61	7
Saúl Mendoza	T54	1500m	3:10.31	28	did not advance			
Saúl Mendoza	T54	5000m	10:51.39	10 Q	—N/a		10:25.48	6
Saúl Mendoza	T54	Marathon	—N/a				1:36:14	29
Pedro Meza	T46	5000m	—N/a				15:25.26	6
Pedro Meza	T46	Marathon	—N/a				2:38:57	8
Jaime Ramírez	T53	100m	16.06	10	did not advance			
Jaime Ramírez	T53	200m	28.72	14	did not advance			
Jaime Ramírez	T53	400m	1:02.20	20	did not advance			
Fernando Sánchez	T54	100m	15.23	17	did not advance			
Fernando Sánchez	T54	200m	26.55	17	did not advance			
Fernando Sánchez	T54	400m	48.76	6 Q	51.39	9	did not advance	
Freddy Sandoval	T54	100m	14.91	11	did not advance			
Freddy Sandoval	T54	200m	26.76	19	did not advance			
Freddy Sandoval	T54	400m	51.57	24	did not advance			
Mario Santillán	T46	5000m	—N/a				14:43.78	3rd place, bronze medalist(s)
Mario Santillán	T46	Marathon	—N/a				2:27:04 WR	1st place, gold medalist(s)
Gonzalo Valdovinos	T54	100m	14.94	14	did not advance			
Gonzalo Valdovinos	T54	200m	25.60	7 q	—N/a		26.31	7
Gonzalo Valdovinos	T54	400m	49.61	12 Q	53.34	14	did not advance	
Luis Zapien	T11	5000m	—N/a				DSQ	
Alfonso Zaragoza	T54	800m	1:41.43	21	did not advance			
Alfonso Zaragoza	T54	1500m	3:18.74	32	did not advance			
Alfonso Zaragoza	T54	5000m	10:24.13	16	did not advance			
Alfonso Zaragoza	T54	Marathon	—N/a				1:30:30	20
Jaime Ramírez; Fernando Sánchez; Freddy Sandoval; Gonzalo Valdovinos	T53-54	4 × 100 m relay	53.16	5	did not advance			
Jaime Ramírez; Fernando Sánchez; Freddy Sandoval; Gonzalo Valdovinos	T53-54	4 × 400 m relay	3:22.56	6	did not advance			

==== Men's field ====
Athlete	Class	Event	Final		
Athlete	Class	Event	Result	Points	Rank
Benjamín Cardozo	F37-38	Long jump	5.17	898	11
Fernando del Rosario	F57-58	Discus throw	47.44	889	10
Mauro Maximo de Jesus	F53-54	Javelin throw	20.39	1023	5
Mauro Maximo de Jesus	F53-54	Shot put	8.72 WR	1073	1st place, gold medalist(s)
Adrián Paz Velázquez	F53-54	Javelin throw	19.55 SB	981	8
Enrique Sánchez	F55-56	Shot put	10.57 SB	911	11
Luis Alberto Zepeda Félix	F53-54	Javelin throw	28.67 SB	1087	3rd place, bronze medalist(s)

==== Women's track ====
Athlete	Class	Event	Heats		Final	
Athlete	Class	Event	Result	Rank	Result	Rank
Yazmith Bataz	T54	100m	18.15	10	did not advance	
Yazmith Bataz	T54	200m	31.99	7 Q	31.05	7
Yazmith Bataz	T54	400m	1:00.29	11	did not advance	
Perla Bustamante	T42	100m	—N/a		16.32 WR	1st place, gold medalist(s)
Evelyn Enciso	T53	100m	18.83	8 q	18.43	8
Evelyn Enciso	T53	200m	33.32	9	did not advance	
Evelyn Enciso	T53	400m	1:03.31	8 q	1:01.89	8
Evelyn Enciso	T53	800m	—N/a		2:02.99	7
Gloria Sanchez	T54	100m	18.40	13	did not advance	
Gloria Sanchez	T54	200m	33.43	15	did not advance	
Gloria Sanchez	T54	400m	1:03.13	13	did not advance	
Yazmith Bataz; Evelyn Enciso; Floralia Estrada; Gloria Sanchez	T53-54	4 × 100 m relay	—N/a		DSQ	

==== Women's field ====
Athlete	Class	Event	Final		
Athlete	Class	Event	Result	Points	Rank
Perla Bustamante	F42	Long jump	3.51 SB	-	4
Perla Bustamante	F42-46	Shot put	9.07	933	6
Dora Garcia	F54-56	Javelin throw	11.61	793	14
Leticia Ochoa	F33-34/52-53	Javelin throw	8.69	966	9
Angeles Ortiz Hernandez	F57-58	Shot put	10.94	1126	2nd place, silver medalist(s)
Esther Rivera	F33-34/52-53	Javelin throw	11.69	1027	4
Catalina Rosales	F57-58	Discus throw	26.12	831	11
Catalina Rosales	F57-58	Shot put	9.51	978	5
Estela Salas	F32-34/51-53	Discus throw	12.59	848	13
Estela Salas	F33-34/52-53	Javelin throw	11.33	995	6
Azucena Saucedo	F54-56	Shot put	7.56	908	9
Jeny Velazco	F57-58	Javelin throw	30.57	1037	3rd place, bronze medalist(s)

=== Cycling ===
==== Men's road ====
Athlete	Event	Time	Rank
Edgar Navarro	Men's road time trial HC A	46:16.11	7

=== Judo ===
==== Men ====
Athlete	Event	First Round	Quarterfinals	Semifinals	Repechage round 1	Repechage round 2	Final/ Bronze medal contest
Athlete	Event	Opposition Result	Opposition Result	Opposition Result	Opposition Result	Opposition Result	Opposition Result
Eduardo Ávila	Men's 73kg	Bye	Hierrezuelo (CUB); W 0020–0000	F Ramirez (ARG); W 1100-0000	—N/a		Xu Z (CHN); W 1000-0000 (gold)

==== Women ====
Athlete	Event	First Round	Semifinals	Repechage	Final/ Bronze medal contest
Athlete	Event	Opposition Result	Opposition Result	Opposition Result	Opposition Result
Lenia Ruvalcaba	Women's 70kg	Pernheim (SWE); W 0200-000	Savostyanova (RUS); W 0110-0101	—N/a	del Carmen Herrera (ESP); L 0000-1021 (silver)

=== Swimming ===
Athlete	Class	Event	Heats		Final	
Athlete	Class	Event	Result	Rank	Result	Rank
Jose Castorena	S4	50m freestyle	50.79	12	did not advance	
Vidal Dominguez	S5	50m butterfly	45.32	8 Q	45.50	7
Vidal Dominguez	SB4	100m breaststroke	2:05.17	13	did not advance	
Vidal Dominguez	SM5	200m individual medley	3:45.96	7 Q	3:50.11	8
Pedro Rangel	SB5	100m breaststroke	1:33.95	1 Q	1:34.69	1st place, gold medalist(s)
Juan Ignacio Reyes	S4	50m backstroke	42.71 WR	1 Q	42.77	1st place, gold medalist(s)
Juan Ignacio Reyes	S4	50m freestyle	44.02	7 Q	43.07	7
Juan Ignacio Reyes	S4	100m freestyle	1:36.25	6 Q	1:37.30	8
Juan Ignacio Reyes	S4	200m freestyle	3:28.73	6 Q	3:25.57	7
Juan Ignacio Reyes	S5	50m butterfly	46.00	10	did not advance	
Cristopher Tronco Sánchez	S3	50m backstroke	1:06.04	9	did not advance	
Cristopher Tronco Sánchez	S3	50m freestyle	1:05.00	9	did not advance	
Cristopher Tronco Sánchez	S3	100m freestyle	2:23.03	9	did not advance	
Jose Castorena; Vidal Dominguez; Pedro Rangel; Juan Ignacio Reyes	N/A	4x50m freestyle relay	—N/a		3:02.50	5
Jose Castorena; Vidal Dominguez; Pedro Rangel; Juan Ignacio Reyes	N/A	4x50m medley relay	3:06.32	7 Q	3:04.44	7

==== Women ====
Athlete	Class	Event	Heats		Final	
Athlete	Class	Event	Result	Rank	Result	Rank
Doramitzi Gonzalez	S6	100m backstroke S6	1:42.21	7 Q	1:36.90	6
Doramitzi Gonzalez	S6	50m butterfly	44.00	9	did not advance	
Doramitzi Gonzalez	S6	50m freestyle	38.20	4 Q	36.52	2nd place, silver medalist(s)
Doramitzi Gonzalez	S6	100m freestyle	1:23.37	3 Q	1:19.36	3rd place, bronze medalist(s)
Doramitzi Gonzalez	S6	400m freestyle	6:15.97	6 Q	6:06.84	5
Virginia Hernandez	S2	50m backstroke	1:41.87	9	did not advance	
Nely Miranda	S4	50m freestyle	—N/a		46.27 WR	1st place, gold medalist(s)
Nely Miranda	S4	100m freestyle	1:45.89	1 Q	1:44.11	1st place, gold medalist(s)
Nely Miranda	S5	200m freestyle	3:28.20	7 Q	3:32.08	7
Nadia Porras	S5	50m backstroke	56.42	9	did not advance	
Nadia Porras	S5	200m freestyle	3:36.09	10	did not advance	
Fabiola Ramirez	S3	50m backstroke	1:21.71	9	did not advance	
Fabiola Ramirez	S3	50m freestyle	1:17.92	11	did not advance	
Patricia Valle	S3	50m backstroke	1:17.89	7 Q	1:12.88	4
Patricia Valle	S3	50m freestyle	59.84	2 Q	57.05	1st place, gold medalist(s)
Patricia Valle	S4	100m freestyle	2:03.82	6 Q	2:02.50	7
Patricia Valle	SM4	150m individual medley	—N/a		3:29.36	3rd place, bronze medalist(s)

=== Powerlifting ===
==== Men ====
Athlete	Event	Result	Rank
Porfirio Arredondo	75kg	197.5	5
Jesus Castillo	90kg	200.0	4

==== Women ====
Athlete	Event	Result	Rank
Perla Patricia Barcenas	82.5kg	130.0	3rd place, bronze medalist(s)
Laura Cerero	40kg	92.5	3rd place, bronze medalist(s)
Catalina Diaz	75kg	115.0	4
Amalia Pérez	52kg	128.0 PR	1st place, gold medalist(s)

=== Table tennis ===
Athlete	Event	Preliminaries				Round of 16	Quarterfinals	Semifinals	Final / BM	
Athlete	Event	Opposition Result	Opposition Result	Opposition Result	Rank	Opposition Result	Opposition Result	Opposition Result	Opposition Result	Rank
Teresa Arenales	Women's singles C4	Weinmann (GER); L 0–3	Jung (KOR); L 1-3	Sacca (ITA); L 1-3	4	did not advance				
Maria Paredes	Women's singles C5	Gu G (CHN); L WBF	Wei M H (TPE); L 0-3	Wong P Y (HKG); W 3-2	3	did not advance				
Teresa Arenales; Maria Paredes	Women's team C4-5	No preliminaries				Chinese Taipei (TPE); L 0-3	did not advance			

=== Wheelchair basketball ===
The women's basketball team didn't win any medals; they were 9th out of 10 teams.

==== Players ====
- Floralia Estrada Bernal
- Rosa Camara Arango
- Wendy Garcia Amador
- Rubicela Guzman Acosta
- Claudia Magali Miranda
- Anaisa Perez Pacheco
- Patricia Rodriguez Velazquez
- Rocio Torres Lopez
- Alma Torres Rodriguez
- Lucia Vazquez Delgadillo
- Cecilia Vazquez Suarez
- Rosa Herlinda Vera

Coach

- Aarón Dávila García

==== Tournament ====
7 September 2008
12:15

Netherlands	59–46	Mexico
Scoring by quarter: 18 - 11, 11 - 15, 12 - 8, 18 - 12

Beijing Science and Technology University Gymnasium, Beijing
Attendance: 2,140
Referees: Matthew Brian Wells (Australia)

8 September 2008
9:00

Mexico	34–52	Japan

Beijing Science and Technology University Gymnasium, Beijing

9 September 2008
13:30

China	53–37	Mexico

National Indoor Stadium, Beijing

10 September 2008
15:30

Mexico	38–71	Canada

Beijing Science and Technology University Gymnasium, Beijing

9th-10th classification

14 September 2008
13:30

Brazil	44–54	Mexico
Scoring by quarter: 12 - 16, 11 - 8, 12 - 18, 9 - 12

National Indoor Stadium, Beijing
Attendance: 12,000
Referees: Seppo Olavi Viljanen (Czech Republic)

== See also ==
- Mexico at the Paralympics
- Mexico at the 2008 Summer Olympics
