= Athletics at the 2008 Summer Paralympics – Men's 100 metres T53 =

The Men's 100m T53 had its competition held on September 16 with the first round at 11:51 and the final at 17:48.

== Medalists ==
Gold	Josh George; United States
Silver	Mickey Bushell; Great Britain
Bronze	Shiran Yu; China

== Results ==
Place	Athlete	Round 1	Final
1	Josh George (USA)	15.17 Q	14.79
2	Mickey Bushell (GBR)	15.33 Q	14.86
3	Shiran Yu (CHN)	14.81 Q PR	15.09
4	Sopa Intasen (THA)	15.72 q	15.20
5	Pichet Krungget (THA)	15.41 Q	15.20
6	Brent Lakatos (CAN)	15.26 Q	15.21
7	Hamad Aladwani (KUW)	15.75 q	15.36
8	Ariosvaldo Silva (BRA)	15.46 Q	15.40
9	Dong-Ho Jung (KOR)	15.82	
10	Jaime Ramirez (MEX)	16.06	
11	Jesus Aguilar (VEN)	16.48	
12	Roy Patrick Guerin (IRL)	16.59	
13	Eric Gauthier (CAN)	18.19	

== Footnotes ==
- Round 1 - Heat 1
- Round 1 - Heat 2
- Final
