= Athletics at the 2008 Summer Paralympics – Men's javelin throw F53–54 =

Men's Javelin F53/54 at the XIII Paralympic Games
- Venue: Beijing National Stadium
- Dates: 12 September
- Competitors: 11 from 9 nations
- Winning distance: 29.33

Medalists
1st place, gold medalist(s)		Markku Niinimaki	Finland
2nd place, silver medalist(s)		Abdolreza Jokar	Iran
3rd place, bronze medalist(s)		Luis Alberto Zepeda Félix	Mexico

The men's javelin F53/54 event at the 2008 Summer Paralympics took place at the Beijing National Stadium at 09:10 on 12 September. There was a single round of competition; after the first three throws, only the top seven had 3 further throws (there is no indication on the official result as to why this was not the normal eight). The competition was won by Markku Niinimaki, representing Finland.

== Results ==
Rank	Athlete	Nationality	Cl.	1	2	3	4	5	6	Best	Pts.	Notes
1st place, gold medalist(s)	Markku Niinimaki	Finland	F54	27.33	x	28.17	28.09	x	29.33	29.33	1112	WR
2nd place, silver medalist(s)	Abdolreza Jokar	Iran	F53	22.07	20.73	21.45	21.02	22.01	22.08	22.08	1108	WR
3rd place, bronze medalist(s)	Luis Alberto Zepeda Félix	Mexico	F54	26.31	27.13	27.33	25.38	28.67	27.98	28.67	1087	SB
4	Draženko Mitrović	Serbia	F54	x	25.98	x	24.66	25.87	27.42	27.42	1040	SB
5	Mauro Maximo	Mexico	F53	20.39	17.35	20.25	x	19.57	19.26	20.39	1023	
6	Alexey Kuznetsov	Russia	F54	25.27	26.78	25.81	25.86	25.15	24.63	26.78	1015	SB
7	Fan Liang	China	F54	x	25.79	26.06	22.96	25.21	24.76	26.06	988	
8	Adrian Paz	Mexico	F53	18.44	19.42	19.55	-	-	-	19.55	981	SB
9	Germano Bernardi	Italy	F54	23.04	22.58	23.23	-	-	-	23.23	881	SB
10	Andreas Gratt	Austria	F54	18.48	17.34	18.02	-	-	-	18.48	701	
11	Alphanso Cunningham	Jamaica	F53	x	x	13.86	-	-	-	13.86	695	

WR = World Record. SB = Seasonal Best.
