= Ghana at the 2012 Summer Paralympics =

- IPC code: GHA
- NPC: National Paralympic Committee of Ghana

in London
- Competitors: 4 in 3 sports
- Medals: Gold 0 Silver 0 Bronze 0 Total 0

Summer Paralympics appearances (overview)
- 2004; 2008; 2012; 2016; 2020; 2024

Ghana competed at the 2012 Summer Paralympics in London, United Kingdom from August 29 to September 9, 2012. The team included people who had survived polio.

== Athletics ==
Men's Track and Road Events

Athlete	Event	Heat		Final	
Athlete	Event	Result	Rank	Result	Rank
Nkegbe Botsyo	100m T54	15.52	7	did not advance	

Women's Track and Road Events

Athlete	Event	Result	Rank
Anita Fordjour	100m T53	18.91	7
Anita Fordjour	200m T53	34.31	7

== Cycling ==
=== Road ===
Men

Athlete	Event	Time	Rank
Mumuni Alem	Road Race C1-3	DNF	
Mumuni Alem	Time Trial C2	32:49.56	16

== Powerlifting ==
Men

Athlete	Event	Result	Rank
Charles Teye	-67.5kg	140	9

== See also ==
- Ghana at the 2012 Summer Olympics
