= Athletics at the 2008 Summer Paralympics – Men's 200 metres T54 =

The Men's 200m T54 had its First Round held on September 12 at 11:00 and its Final on September 14 at 9:50.

== Medalists ==
Gold	Lixin Zhang; China
Silver	Saichon Konjen; Thailand
Bronze	Leo-Pekka Tahti; Finland

== Results ==
Place	Athlete	Round 1	Final
1	Lixin Zhang (CHN)	24.18 Q WR	24.34
2	Saichon Konjen (THA)	25.33 Q	25.15
3	Leo-Pekka Tahti (FIN)	24.92 Q	25.17
4	Kenny van Weeghel (NED)	25.00 Q	25.28
5	Jun Li (CHN)	25.55 q	25.86
6	Mohammad Vahdani (UAE)	25.37 Q	26.10
7	Gonzalo Valdovinos (MEX)	25.60 q	26.31
8	Kai Zong (CHN)	25.67 Q	DSQ
9	Supachai Koysub (THA)	25.79	
10	Gyu-Dae Kim (KOR)	26.12	
11	Yoshifumi Nagao (JPN)	26.14	
11	Marc Schuh (GER)	26.14	
13	Erik Hightower (USA)	26.15	
14	Colin Mathieson (CAN)	26.37	
14	Richard Nicholson (AUS)	26.37	
16	Nkegbe Botsoy (GHA)	26.48	
17	Fernando Sanchez (MEX)	26.55	
18	Choke Yasuoka (JPN)	26.57	
19	Freddy Sandoval (MEX)	26.76	
20	Mohamed Bouadda (ALG)	26.84	
21	Ahmed Aouadi (TUN)	27.03	
22	Juan Valladares (VEN)	27.21	
