= Athletics at the 2008 Summer Paralympics – Men's 400 metres T54 =

The Men's 400m T54 had its First Round held on September 8 at 10:05, its Semifinals on September 9 at 20:35 and its Final on September 10 at 21:00.

== Medalists ==
Gold	Lixin Zhang; China
Silver	David Weir; Great Britain
Bronze	Saichon Konjen; Thailand

== Results ==
Place	Athlete	Round 1	Semifinal	Final
1	Lixin Zhang (CHN)	46.75 Q PR	48.52 Q	45.07 WR
2	David Weir (GBR)	47.26 Q	47.46 Q	46.02
3	Saichon Konjen (THA)	48.03 Q	48.39 Q	46.86
4	Julien Casoli (FRA)	48.99 Q	50.01 q	47.64
5	Marcel Hug (SUI)	47.78 Q	49.40 q	47.67
6	Supachai Koysub (THA)	49.32 Q	48.75 Q	48.39
7	Kenny van Weeghel (NED)	48.69 Q	48.72 Q	48.52
8	Mohammad Vahdani (UAE)	49.37 Q	51.09 Q	49.20
9	Fernando Sanchez (MEX)	48.76 Q	51.39	
10	Yoshifumi Nagao (JPN)	49.75 Q	51.66	
11	Erik Hightower (USA)	49.76 q	51.67	
12	Colin Mathieson (CAN)	49.81 q	51.69	
13	Ahmed Aouadi (TUN)	50.24 q	52.84	
14	Gonzalo Valdovinos (MEX)	49.61 Q	53.34	
15	Marc Schuh (GER)	49.05 Q	54.46	
16	Jean Paul Compaore (CAN)	49.42 q	58.75	
17	Choke Yasuoka (JPN)	50.24		
18	Kenji Kotani (JPN)	50.32		
19	Gyu-Dae Kim (KOR)	50.35		
20	Richard Nicholson (AUS)	50.36		
21	Juan Valladares (VEN)	50.45		
22	Alhassane Balde (GER)	50.68		
23	Ekkachai Janthon (THA)	51.26		
24	Freddy Sandoval (MEX)	51.57		
25	Jialin Xiao (CHN)	51.69		
26	Maurice Amacher (SUI)	52.53		
	Jeff Adams (CAN)	DNS		
