= Taekwondo at the 2020 Summer Paralympics – Women's +58 kg =

Taekwondo – Women's +58 kg K44 at the XVI Paralympic Games
- Venue: Makuhari Messe Hall B
- Date: 4 September 2021
- Competitors: 11 from 11 nations

Medalists
1st place, gold medalist(s)		Guljonoy Naimova	Uzbekistan
2nd place, silver medalist(s)		Débora Menezes	Brazil
3rd place, bronze medalist(s)		Amy Truesdale	Great Britain
3rd place, bronze medalist(s)		Janine Watson	Australia

The women's +58 kg taekwondo competition at the 2020 Summer Paralympics was held on 4 September 2021 at the Makuhari Messe Hall B.

== Results ==
=== Bracket ===
Round of 16
Rajae Akermach (MAR)	8
Janine Watson (AUS)	6
Guljonoy Naimova (UZB)	30
Rayeheh Shahab (IRI)	9
Aynur Mammadova (AZE)
Yuliya Lypetska (UKR)	WWD
Laura Schiel (FRA)
Daniela Martínez (MEX)	RSC

Quarterfinals
Amy Truesdale (GBR)	42
Rajae Akermach (MAR)	27
Guljonoy Naimova (UZB)	37
Shoko Ota (JPN)	12
Şeyma Nur Emeksiz Bacaksız (TUR)	10
Yuliya Lypetska (UKR)	22
Débora Menezes (BRA)	24
Daniela Martínez (MEX)	12

Semifinals
Amy Truesdale (GBR)	14
Guljonoy Naimova (UZB)	60
Yuliya Lypetska (UKR)	10
Débora Menezes (BRA)	55

Final
Guljonoy Naimova (UZB)	8
Débora Menezes (BRA)	4

=== Repechage ===
Repechage 1
Rayeheh Shahab (IRI)	17
Daniela Martínez (MEX)	10

Repechage 2
Rayeheh Shahab (IRI)	WWD
Rajae Akermach (MAR)

Bronze medal
Amy Truesdale (GBR)	41
Rayeheh Shahab (IRI)	31

Repechage 1
Janine Watson (AUS)	RSC
Şeyma Nur Emeksiz Bacaksız (TUR)
Laura Schiel (FRA)
Shoko Ota (JPN)	WWD

Repechage 2
Janine Watson (AUS)	32
Shoko Ota (JPN)	12

Bronze medal
Yuliya Lypetska (UKR)	0
Janine Watson (AUS)	63
