= Athletics at the 2008 Summer Paralympics – Men's 200 metres T53 =

The Men's 200m T53 had its competition held on September 13 with the first round at 12:31 and the Final at 20:35.

== Medalists ==
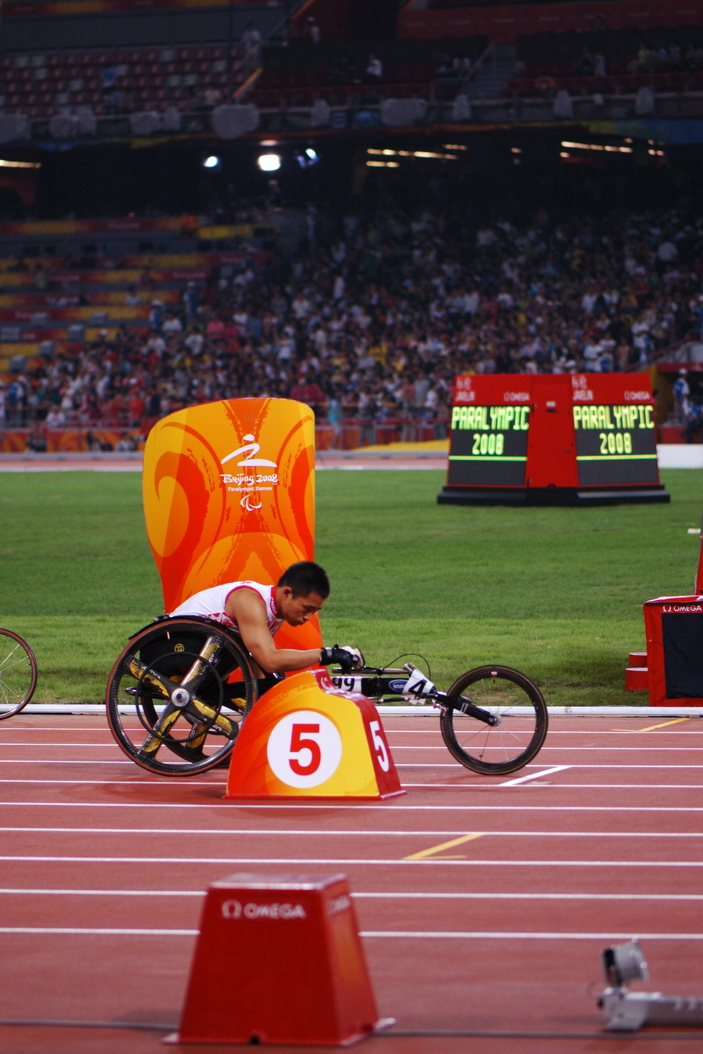
Chinese athlete Shiran Yu won with 26.64 seconds.

Gold	Shiran Yu; China
Silver	Richard Colman; Australia
Bronze	Suk-Man Hong; South Korea

== Results ==
Place	Athlete	Round 1	Final
1	Shiran Yu (CHN)	26.79 Q	26.64
2	Richard Colman (AUS)	26.80 Q	26.71
3	Suk-Man Hong (KOR)	27.02 Q	26.87
4	Josh George (USA)	26.81 Q	26.98
5	Brent Lakatos (CAN)	27.42 q	27.44
6	Hamad Aladwani (KUW)	27.74 q	27.67
7	Jesus Aguilar (VEN)	27.96 Q	27.86
8	Pierre Fairbank (FRA)	28.27 Q	27.94
9	Mickey Bushell (GBR)	27.85	
10	Sergey Shilov (RUS)	28.02	
11	Pichet Krungget (THA)	28.03	
12	Ariosvaldo Silva (BRA)	28.56	
13	Sopa Intasen (THA)	28.58	
14	Jaime Ramirez (MEX)	28.72	
15	Eric Gauthier (CAN)	28.75	
