= Fernanda Vargas =

Mexican para taekwondo practitioner (born 2002)

Personal information
- Full name: Fernanda Vargas Fernández
- Born: 24 October 2002 (age 23)

Sport
- Country: Mexico
- Sport: Para taekwondo
Medal record
Representing Mexico
World Championships
Silver medal – second place	2023 Veracruz	+65 kg
Parapan American Games
Gold medal – first place	2023 Santiago	+65 kg

Fernanda Vargas Fernández (Note: In this Spanish name, the first or paternal surname is Vargas and the second or maternal family name is Fernández.) (born 24 October 2002) is a Mexican para taekwondo practitioner.

At the World Championships in September 2023, Vargas won the silver medal when she lost to Amy Truesdale in the gold medal match. Two months later, she won the gold medal in the women's +65 kg event at the Parapan American Games held in Santiago, Chile.
