= Athletics at the 2008 Summer Paralympics – Men's 5000 metres T54 =

The Men's 5,000m T54 had its First Round held on September 8 at 19:18 and its Final on September 11 at 19:35.

== Medalists ==
Gold	Prawat Wahoram; Thailand
Silver	Kurt Fearnley; Australia
Bronze	David Weir; Great Britain

== Results ==
Place	Athlete	Round 1	Final
1	Prawat Wahoram (THA)	10:21.31 Q	10:22.38
2	Kurt Fearnley (AUS)	10:13.21 Q PR	10:22.97
3	David Weir (GBR)	10:21.27 Q	10:23.03
4	Marcel Hug (SUI)	10:51.19 Q	10:23.20
5	Kota Hokinoue (JPN)	10:14.55 q	10:23.70
6	Saul Mendoza (MEX)	10:51.39 Q	10:25.48
7	Aaron Gordian (MEX)	10:14.41 Q	10:25.49
8	Tomasz Hamerlak (POL)	10:16.03 q	10:25.67
9	Roger Puigbo (ESP)	10:15.34 q	10:25.78
10	Josh Cassidy (CAN)	10:15.11 q	10:26.15
11	Masazumi Soejima (JPN)	10:22.43	
12	Heinz Frei (SUI)	10:23.24	
13	Ralph Brunner (GER)	10:23.71	
14	Jorge Madera (ESP)	10:23.80	
15	Denis Lemeunier (FRA)	10:24.05	
16	Alfonso Zaragoza (MEX)	10:24.13	
17	Tony Iniguez (USA)	10:28.87	
18	Ekkachai Janthon (THA)	10:51.15	
19	Maurice Amacher (SUI)	10:51.41	
20	Jun Hiromichi (JPN)	10:52.28	
21	Ampai Sualuang (THA)	10:53.53	
22	Alain Fuss (FRA)	10:53.54	
23	Adam Bleakney (USA)	10:53.56	
24	Rafael Botello (ESP)	10:54.43	
25	Ebbe Blichfeldt (DEN)	10:57.56	
26	Michel Filteau (CAN)	11:01.20	
27	Mark Ledo (CAN)	11:30.43	
28	Aron Anderson (SWE)	11:30.79	
	Brian Alldis (GBR)	DNF	
