= Athletics at the 2008 Summer Paralympics – Men's 800 metres T54 =

Men's 800 metres T54 at the XIII Paralympic Games
- Dates: 11 September – 13 September
- Competitors: 27 from 15 nations
- Winning time: 1:36.61

Medalists
1st place, gold medalist(s)		David Weir	Great Britain
2nd place, silver medalist(s)		Kurt Fearnley	Australia
3rd place, bronze medalist(s)		Prawat Wahoram	Thailand

The men's 800m T54 had its first round held on September 11 at 11:34, its semifinals on September 12 at 21:00 and its final on September 13 at 21:03.

== Results ==
Place	Athlete	Round 1	Semifinal	Final
1	David Weir (GBR)	1:36.24 Q	1:34.27 Q	1:36.61
2	Kurt Fearnley (AUS)	1:38.79 Q	1:39.39 Q	1:36.76
3	Prawat Wahoram (THA)	1:38.84 Q	1:34.59 Q	1:37.12
4	Yanfeng Cui (CHN)	1:37.40 Q	1:34.93 Q	1:37.41
5	Marcel Hug (SUI)	1:40.16 Q	1:35.24 q	1:37.51
6	Julien Casoli (FRA)	1:40.13 Q	1:35.11 q	1:37.56
7	Saul Mendoza (MEX)	1:37.40 Q	1:40.36 Q	1:38.61
8	Khachonsak Thamsophon (THA)	1:40.22 q	1:40.37 Q	1:38.73
9	Jean Paul Compaore (CAN)	1:36.66 Q	1:35.43	
10	Kenji Kotani (JPN)	DNF q	1:35.83	
11	Aaron Gordian (MEX)	1:40.45 Q	1:36.43	
12	Tony Iniguez (USA)	1:39.72 q	1:37.30	
13	Choke Yasuoka (JPN)	1:36.51 Q	1:40.39	
14	Alejandro Maldonado (ARG)	1:40.22 q	1:40.62	
15	Tyler Byers (USA)	1:38.73 q	1:41.00	
16	Ampai Sualuang (THA)	1:37.54 q	1:41.20	
17	Hiroki Sasahara (JPN)	1:37.42 Q	1:41.28	
18	Josh Cassidy (CAN)	1:40.54		
19	Tobias Lotscher (SUI)	1:41.00		
20	Alhassane Balde (GER)	1:41.22		
21	Alfonso Zaragoza (MEX)	1:41.43		
22	Ji Zhao (CHN)	1:41.57		
23	Brian Alldis (GBR)	1:42.38		
24	Ibrahim Salim Banihammad (UAE)	1:43.00		
25	Aron Anderson (SWE)	1:46.42		
	Lixin Zhang (CHN)	DNF		
	Thierry Mabicka (GAB)	DSQ		
