= Ghana at the Paralympics =

- IPC code: GHA
- NPC: National Paralympic Committee of Ghana
- Medals: Gold 0 Silver 0 Bronze 0 Total 0

Summer appearances
- 2004; 2008; 2012; 2016; 2020; 2024

Ghana made its Paralympic Games début at the 2004 Summer Paralympics in Athens, sending three representatives to compete in two sports. Nkegbe Botsyo, in athletics, took part in the men's 100m, 200m and 400m, in the T54 category. Ajara Mohammed entered the women's 800m and the marathon, also in the T54 category. Alfred Adjetey Sowah competed in powerlifting, in the men's up to 52 kg.

Botsyo and Mohammed returned to compete again in the 2008 Summer Paralympics in Beijing, the former in the men's 100m and 200m (T54), and the latter in the women's 200m and 1,500m (T54).

No Ghanaian has ever won a medal at the Paralympic Games,

Ghana took part in the 2012 Summer Paralympics, and the National Paralympic Committee of Ghana chose Bedford as the UK training base for its Paralympians.

== Medals ==
=== Medals at Summer Games ===
Games	Athletes	Gold	Silver	Bronze	Total	Rank
(Greece) Athens 2004	3	0	0	0	0	-
(China) Beijing 2008	2	0	0	0	0	-
(United Kingdom) London 2012	4	0	0	0	0	-
(Brazil) Rio de Janeiro 2016	3	0	0	0	0	-
(Japan) Tokyo 2020	2	0	0	0	0	-
(France) Paris 2024	4	0	0	0	0	-
(United States) Los Angeles 2028	Future Event					
(Australia) Brisbane 2032	Future Event					
Total		0	0	0	0	-

=== Medals at Winter Games ===
Games	Athletes	Gold	Silver	Bronze	Total	Rank
(China) Beijing 2022	Future Event					
(Italy) Milan/Cortina 2026	Future Event					
Total		0	0	0	0	−

== See also ==
- Ghana at the Olympics
