= Markku Niinimäki =

Finnish Paralympic athlete

Medal record

Paralympic athletics

Representing Finland

Paralympic Games
Gold medal – first place	2008 Beijing	Javelin Throw - F53/54
Silver medal – second place	2008 Beijing	Shot put - F53/54
Bronze medal – third place	2004 Athens	Shot put - F54

Markku Niinimäki is a Paralympian athlete from Finland competing mainly in category F54 shot put and javelin events.

Markku has competed in two Paralympic Games. In 2004 he competed in the javelin and won a bronze medal in the F54 shot put. In 2008 he won a silver in the combined F53/54 shot put and a gold in the F53/54 javelin.
