= Athletics at the 2008 Summer Paralympics – Men's 1500 metres T54 =

The Men's 1,500m T54 had its First Round held on September 14 at 19:39, its Semifinals on September 15 at 9:23 and its Final on September 16 at 20:27.

== Medalists ==
Gold	David Weir; Great Britain
Silver	Prawat Wahoram; Thailand
Bronze	Kurt Fearnley; Australia

== Results ==
Place	Athlete	Round 1	Semifinal	Final
1	David Weir (GBR)	3:09.55 Q	3:10.41 Q	3:10.34
2	Prawat Wahoram (THA)	3:09.24 Q	3:00.10 Q PR	3:10.68
3	Kurt Fearnley (AUS)	3:06.96 Q	3:00.15 Q	3:14.28
4	Alejandro Maldonado (ARG)	3:14.21 Q	3:09.31 Q	3:14.92
5	Denis Lemeunier (FRA)	3:18.11 Q	3:01.95 q	3:16.43
6	Tomasz Hamerlak (POL)	3:07.10 Q	3:01.71 q	3:17.60
7	Julien Casoli (FRA)	3:14.33 Q	3:09.11 Q	DNF
8	Marcel Hug (SUI)	3:17.27 Q	3:10.33 Q	DNF
9	Richard Colman (AUS)	3:08.18 Q	3:02.19	
10	Ekkachai Janthon (THA)	3:07.69 Q	3:02.30	
11	Alain Fuss (FRA)	DNF q	3:02.71	
12	Tyler Byers (USA)	3:10.00 Q	3:06.47	
13	Ampai Suluang (THA)	3:17.72 Q	3:09.37	
14	Josh Cassidy (CAN)	3:09.93 Q	3:09.45	
15	Aaron Gordian (MEX)	3:07.76 Q	3:09.72	
16	Hiroyuki Yamamoto (JPN)	3:15.92 q	3:10.37	
17	Ralph Brunner (GER)	3:08.73 Q	3:10.51	
18	Choke Yasuoka (JPN)	3:17.28 Q	3:10.53	
19	Masazumi Soejima (JPN)	3:14.17 Q	3:10.69	
20	Josh George (USA)	3:13.87 Q	3:11.09	
21	Rafael Botello (ESP)	3:09.66 q	3:11.30	
22	Tony Iniguez (USA)	3:07.84 Q	3:11.84	
23	Ibrahim Salim Banihammad (UAE)	3:09.96 q	3:11.92	
24	Yanfeng Cui (CHN)	DNF q	3:13.86	
25	Tobias Lotscher (SUI)	3:09.24 Q	3:13.98	
26	Michel Filteau (CAN)	3:09.50 q	3:20.01	
27	Byung-Hoon Yoo (KOR)	3:10.24 q	DNS	
28	Saul Mendoza (MEX)	3:10.31		
29	Alhassane Balde (GER)	3:10.99		
30	Maurice Amacher (SUI)	3:14.50		
31	Jorge Madera (ESP)	3:18.22		
32	Alfonso Zaragoza (MEX)	3:18.74		
33	Brian Alldis (GBR)	3:20.28		
34	Aron Anderson (SWE)	3:21.00		
35	Ebbe Blichfeldt (DEN)	3:21.16		
	Jeff Adams (CAN)	DSQ		
