= Swimming at the 2008 Summer Paralympics – Women's 200 metre freestyle S5 =

Women's 200m Freestyle S5 at the XIII Paralympic Games
- Venue: Beijing National Aquatics Center
- Dates: 9 September
- Competitors: 15 from 11 nations
- Winning time: 2:47.47

Medalists
1st place, gold medalist(s)		Teresa Perales	Spain
2nd place, silver medalist(s)		Inbal Pezaro	Israel
3rd place, bronze medalist(s)		Olena Akopyan	Ukraine

The women's 200m freestyle S5 event at the 2008 Summer Paralympics took place at the Beijing National Aquatics Center on 9 September. There were two heats; the swimmers with the eight fastest times advanced to the final.

== Results ==
=== Heats ===
Competed from 10:15.

==== Heat 1 ====
Rank	Name	Nationality	Time	Notes
1	Teresa Perales	Spain	2:58.91	Q
2	Theresa Goh	Singapore	3:18.51	Q
3	Yuka Kawamura	Japan	3:22.29	Q
4	Sugako Takeuchi	Japan	3:40.02	
5	Cheryl Angelelli	United States	3:44.56	
6	Adri Visser	South Africa	3:52.72	
7	Aimee Bruder	United States	3:57.63	

==== Heat 2 ====
Rank	Name	Nationality	Time	Notes
1	Inbal Pezaro	Israel	2:53.94	Q
2	Olena Akopyan	Ukraine	2:54.20	Q
3	Lisette Teunissen	Netherlands	3:23.57	Q
4	Nely Miranda	Mexico	3:28.20	Q
5	Genevieve Pairoux-Lagardere	France	3:31.97	Q
6	Katalin Engelhardt	Hungary	3:32.37	
7	Nadia Porras	Mexico	3:36.09	
8	Diana Zambo	Hungary	3:56.25	

=== Final ===
Competed at 19:13.

Rank	Name	Nationality	Time	Notes
1st place, gold medalist(s)	Teresa Perales	Spain	2:47.47	
2nd place, silver medalist(s)	Inbal Pezaro	Israel	2:49.51	
3rd place, bronze medalist(s)	Olena Akopyan	Ukraine	2:52.51	
4	Theresa Goh	Singapore	3:14.22	
5	Lisette Teunissen	Netherlands	3:22.89	
6	Yuka Kawamura	Japan	3:24.31	
7	Nely Miranda	Mexico	3:32.08	
8	Genevieve Pairoux-Lagardere	France	3:34.02	

Q = qualified for final.
