= Emmanuel Nii Tettey Oku =

Ghanaian weightlifter

Personal information
- Nationality: Ghanaian
- Born: 13 October 1990 (age 35)

Sport
- Country: Ghana
- Sport: Para powerlifting
- Disability: Limb deficiency
Medal record
Powerlifting
Representing Ghana
World Para Powerlifting World Cup
Bronze medal – third place	2020 Manchester	Men's 72 kg

Emmanuel Nii Tettey Oku (born 13 October 1990) is a Ghanaian Paralympic athlete and para powerlifter. He represented Ghana and competed in the men's 72 kg event at the 2020 Summer Paralympics in Tokyo.

== See also ==
- Ghana at the 2020 Summer Paralympics
