= 2024 World Para Taekwondo Poomsae Championships =

1st World Para Taekwondo Poomsae Championships
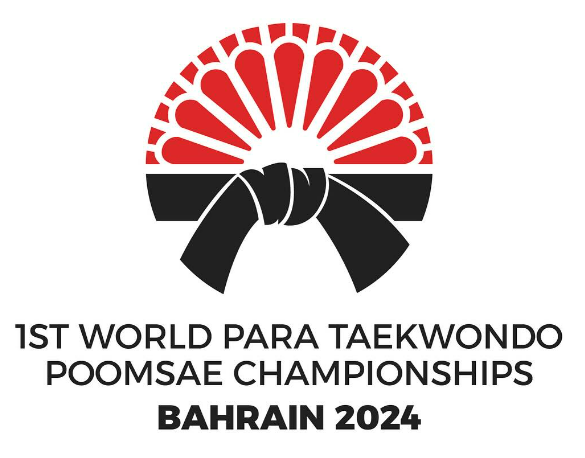
- Venue: Isa Sports City
- Location: Riffa, Bahrain
- Dates: 26 November - 27 November 2024
- Competitors: 140 from 23 nations

Champion
- Morocco
- Men: 91 competitors
- Women: 49 competitors

The 2024 World Para Taekwondo Poomsae Championships were held in Riffa, Bahrain, in the Isa Sports City from 26 to 27 November 2024. The tournament is classified as a G-14 event.

The event was organized by the Bahrain National Paralympic Committee as well as the Bahrain Sports Federation for Disabilities and was promoted by the international governing federation World Taekwondo. The World Para Poomsae Championships were hosted by Bahrain for the first time.

This was also the first time that the World Para Poomsae Championships were held as an independent event, as they had been part of the World Taekwondo Para Championships until 2023, the last edition being the Veracruz 2023 10th World Para Taekwondo Championships. The 2024 tournament is therefore named the 1st World Para Taekwondo Poomsae Championships.

== Medal table ==
* Host nation (Bahrain)

Rank	Nation	Gold	Silver	Bronze	Total
1	Morocco	3	1	1	5
2	Croatia	2	1	4	7
3	Great Britain	2	1	0	3
4	India	1	4	8	13
5	Bahrain*	1	2	3	6
6	Mexico	1	1	3	5
7	Colombia	1	1	1	3
8	Australia	1	1	0	2
9	Greece	1	0	2	3
10	Germany	1	0	0	1
10	Iraq	1	0	0	1
10	Singapore	1	0	0	1
13	Kazakhstan	0	1	1	2
13	Saudi Arabia	0	1	1	2
13	United Arab Emirates	0	1	1	2
16	Individual Neutral Athletes	0	1	0	1
17	Slovakia	0	0	1	1
18	Belgium	0	0	0	0
18	Hungary	0	0	0	0
18	Mozambique	0	0	0	0
18	Palestine	0	0	0	0
18	Poland	0	0	0	0
Totals (22 entries)		16	16	26	58

== Medal summary: Recognized Poomsae ==
=== Men ===
Event	Gold	Silver	Bronze
P72	Moorthy Thirupathi; India	Kathir Hanasekaran; India	
P53	Mahesh Angadi; India		
P52	Madsen Marius; Singapore	Rajendran Rajkumar; India	Aman Kumar; India
P52	Madsen Marius; Singapore	Rajendran Rajkumar; India	Malek Ali A. Alsahrai; Saudi Arabia
P51	E. Goutham Yadav; India		
P34	Arndt Mallepree; Germany	Anand Dhonde; India	Ivan Casarrubias Mendoza; Mexico
P33	Leon Bozo Skravan; Croatia	Filip Cimas; Croatia	Mohamed Jasim; Bahrain
P33	Leon Bozo Skravan; Croatia	Filip Cimas; Croatia	Karen Ovsepya; Kazakhstan
P32	Khandoouch Ayoub; Morocco	Anouar Sellami; Morocco	Jeetin Kumar Bishnoi; India
P31	Bilal El Khattabi; Morocco	Abzal Akhmetkerey; Kazakhstan	Domagoj Vujcic; Croatia
P31	Bilal El Khattabi; Morocco	Abzal Akhmetkerey; Kazakhstan	Patel Pritesh Rakeshbhai; India
P23	Gabriel Josafat Solano Castillo; Mexico	Dominic Barow; Australia	Bruno Zivkovic; Croatia
P23	Gabriel Josafat Solano Castillo; Mexico	Dominic Barow; Australia	Nikolaos Kyprianos Milanos; Greece
P22	Stipe Baric; Croatia	Juan Arturo Plasencia Bustamante; Mexico	Daniel Restrepo Bedoya; Colombia
P22	Stipe Baric; Croatia	Juan Arturo Plasencia Bustamante; Mexico	Angel Daniel Hernandez Cortinas; Mexico
P21	Bradley Brockies; Great Britain	Kirill Arutiunov	Mateo Skara; Croatia
P21	Bradley Brockies; Great Britain	Kirill Arutiunov	Jesus Alfredo Lagunas Ceballos; Mexico

=== Women ===
Event	Gold	Silver	Bronze
P72	Zaina Albalooshi; Bahrain	Aruna Sivakumar; India	Enbatamizhi Sivakumar; India
P72	Zaina Albalooshi; Bahrain	Aruna Sivakumar; India	Radha Sivakumar; India
P52	Qusran Mohammed Oleiwi; Iraq	Warda Hassan; United Arab Emirates	Pinki; India
P52	Qusran Mohammed Oleiwi; Iraq	Warda Hassan; United Arab Emirates	Sara Hassan; United Arab Emirates
P51	Dimitria Korokida; Greece	Rooba Alomari; Bahrain	Anandhi Kulanthaisamy; India
P34	Janine Watson; Australia	Jane Bedford; Great Britain	Eleni Nestora; Greece
P34	Janine Watson; Australia	Jane Bedford; Great Britain	Rinchen Youdol; India
P33	Aya Baali; Morocco	Nemat Kaur; India	Nadia Rabii; Morocco
P32	Krishma Rawat; India	Maha Mohammed S. Alanazi; Saudi Arabia	
P31	Ivona Budiscak; Croatia	Senada Halilcevic; Croatia	
P22	Luisa Fernanda Restrepo Gallego; Colombia	Noora Zainal; Bahrain	Rawan Alsaad; Bahrain
P22	Luisa Fernanda Restrepo Gallego; Colombia	Noora Zainal; Bahrain	Adriana Beresova; Slovakia
P21	Summer Waheed; Great Britain	Sandra Milena Gomez Duanca; Colombia	Yasmeen Fekri; Bahrain
P21	Summer Waheed; Great Britain	Sandra Milena Gomez Duanca; Colombia	Biserka Sambol; Croatia

== Related ==
Also in 2024, the World Poomsae Championships were held as a separate event in Hong Kong from 30 November to 4 December.
