= Şeyma Nur Emeksiz Bacaksız =

Turkish Paralympic taekwondo practitioner

Medal record

Para Taekwondo

Representing Turkey

European Championships
Silver medal – second place	2021 Istanbul	65 kg

Şeyma Nur Emeksiz Bacaksız (born 31 March 1993) is a Turkish Para Taekwondo practitioner. She obtained a quota for participation at the 2020 Summer Paralympics in Tokyo, Japan. She competed in the women's +58 kg event.
