= Ghana at the 2024 Summer Paralympics =

- IPC code: GHA
- NPC: National Paralympic Committee of Ghana

in Paris, France August 28, 2024 – September 8, 2024
- Competitors: 4 in 4 sports
- Flag bearers: Tahiru Haruna; Zinabu Issah
- Medals: Gold 0 Silver 0 Bronze 0 Total 0

Summer Paralympics appearances (overview)
- 2004; 2008; 2012; 2016; 2020; 2024

Ghana competed at the 2024 Summer Paralympics in Paris, France, from 28 August to 8 September.

== Competitors ==
The following is the list of number of competitors in the Games.

Sport	Men	Women	Total
Athletics	0	1	1
Cycling	1	0	1
Powerlifting	1	0	1
Taekwondo	0	1	1
Total	2	2	4

== Athletics ==
Key

- Note–Ranks given for track events are within the athlete's heat only
- Q = Qualified for the next round
- q = Qualified for the next round as a fastest loser or, in field events, by position without achieving the qualifying target
- DQ = Disqualified
- PR = Paralympic Record
- AR = Area (or continental) Record
- NR = National Record
- SB = Season's Best
- N/A = Round not applicable for the event
- Bye = Athlete not required to compete in round

Field events
Women

Athlete	Event	Qualification		Final	
Athlete	Event	Result	Rank	Result	Rank
Zinabu Issah	Women's shot put F57	8.67	1 q	8.84	9
Zinabu Issah	Women's discus throw F57	24.39	3 q	23.85	12

== Cycling ==
Ghana sent one male para-cyclist after finished the top eligible nation's at the 2022 UCI Nation's ranking allocation ranking.

=== Track ===
Men

Athlete	Event	Qualification		Final	
Athlete	Event	Result	Rank	Result	Rank
Frederick Assor; Pilot: Rudolf Mensah	Men's time trial B	1:24.722	11	Did not advance	
Frederick Assor; Pilot: Rudolf Mensah	Men's pursuit B	6:30.071	16	Did not advance	

== Powerlifting ==
Athlete	Event	Attempts (kg)			Result (kg)	Rank
Athlete	Event	1	2	3	Result (kg)	Rank
Tahiru Haruna	Men's + 107 kg	210	~~221~~	~~221~~	210	7

== Taekwondo ==
Athlete	Event	Round of 16	Quarterfinals	Semifinals	Repechage 1	Repechage 2	Final / BM	
Athlete	Event	Opposition Result	Opposition Result	Opposition Result	Opposition Result	Opposition Result	Opposition Result	Rank
Patricia Kyeremaa	Women's +65 kg	Papastamatopoulou (GRE); L 7–24	Did not advance					9

== See also ==
- Ghana at the 2024 Summer Olympics
- Ghana at the Paralympics
