= Athletics at the 2008 Summer Paralympics – Men's shot put F53–54 =

Men's Shot Put F53/54 at the XIII Paralympic Games
- Venue: Beijing National Stadium
- Dates: 16 September
- Competitors: 15 from 10 nations
- Winning distance: 8.72

Medalists
1st place, gold medalist(s)		Mauro Maximo	Mexico
2nd place, silver medalist(s)		Markku Niinimaki	Finland
3rd place, bronze medalist(s)		Che Jon Fernandes	Greece

The men's shot put F53/54 event at the 2008 Summer Paralympics took place at the Beijing National Stadium at 09:05 on 16 September. There was a single round of competition; after the first three throws, only the top eight had three further throws. The competition was won by Mauro Maximo, representing Mexico.

== Results ==
Rank	Athlete	Nationality	Cl.	1	2	3	4	5	6	Best	Pts.	Notes
1st place, gold medalist(s)	Mauro Maximo	Mexico	F53	8.20	8.50	8.72	8.35	8.29	8.18	8.72	1073	WR
2nd place, silver medalist(s)	Markku Niinimaki	Finland	F54	9.08	9.74	9.92	9.69	9.63	9.58	9.92	1021	WR
3rd place, bronze medalist(s)	Che Jon Fernandes	Greece	F53	8.15	8.21	8.17	7.94	8.29	8.17	8.29	1020	SB
4	Ales Kisy	Czech Republic	F53	x	8.05	8.07	7.90	8.25	8.16	8.25	1015	SB
5	Andreas Gratt	Austria	F54	9.54	9.43	9.50	9.62	8.87	9.22	9.62	990	SB
6	Georg Tischler	Austria	F54	9.27	9.42	9.61	9.35	8.96	9.13	9.61	989	
7	Germano Bernardi	Italy	F54	8.93	9.18	9.46	8.39	9.45	9.39	9.46	974	SB
8	Husam F A Azzam	Palestine	F53	7.50	7.49	7.89	7.30	7.42	7.41	7.89	971	SB
9	Scot Severn	United States	F53	7.76	7.74	7.40	-	-	-	7.76	955	SB
10	Daniel Nobbs	Great Britain	F54	8.66	8.20	9.13	-	-	-	9.13	940	
11	Gerasimos Vryonis	Greece	F53	7.40	7.20	7.54	-	-	-	7.54	928	
12	Milan Blaha	Czech Republic	F54	8.88	8.82	8.85	-	-	-	8.88	914	SB
13	Andrej Germic	Slovakia	F54	8.46	8.84	8.41	-	-	-	8.84	910	SB
14	Damianos Daktylidis	Greece	F53	7.00	7.23	7.08	-	-	-	7.23	890	
15	Carlos Leon	United States	F53	6.95	6.55	6.86	-	-	-	6.95	855	

WR = World Record. SB = Seasonal Best.
