= Débora Menezes =

Brazilian para taekwondo practitioner

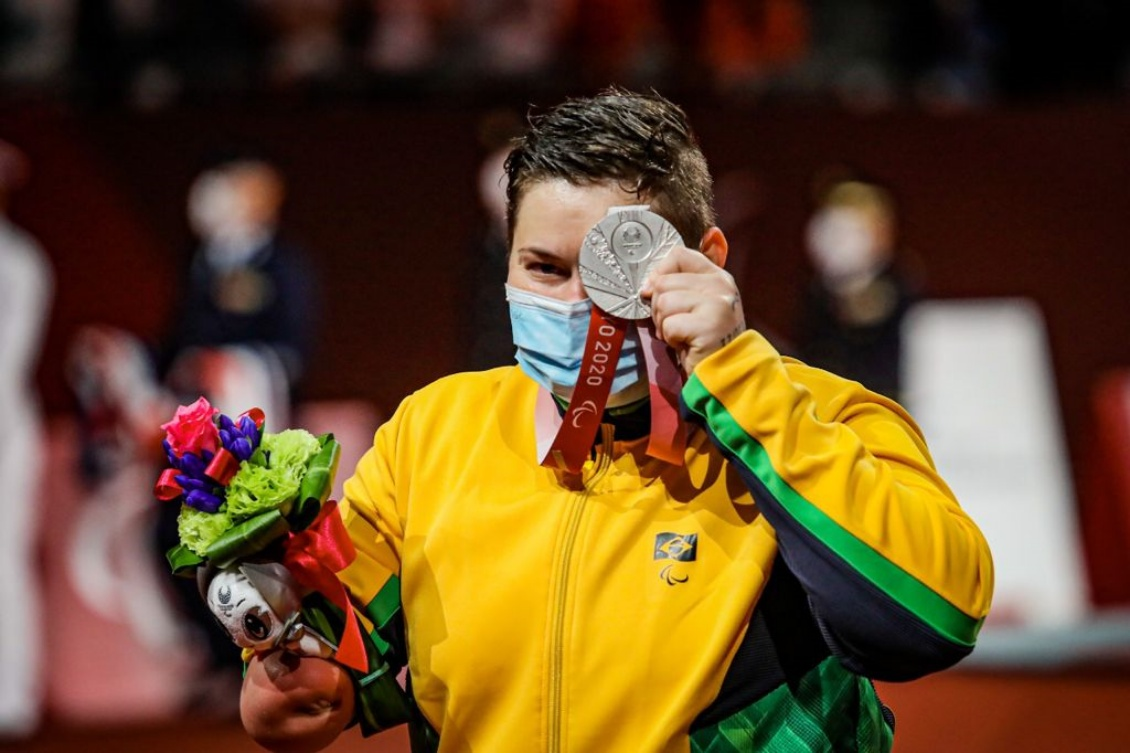
- Menezes at the 2020 Summer Paralympics

Personal information
- Born: 18 May 1990 (age 36) São Paulo, SP

Sport
- Country: Brazil
- Sport: Para taekwondo
Medal record
Representing Brazil
Paralympic Games
Silver medal – second place	2020 Tokyo	+58 kg
Parapan American Games
Silver medal – second place	2019 Lima	+58 kg
Silver medal – second place	2023 Santiago	+65 kg

Débora Bezerra de Menezes (born 18 May 1990) is a Brazilian para taekwondo practitioner.

== Career ==
She won the silver medal in the women's +58 kg event at the 2020 Summer Paralympics in Tokyo, Japan. She came in fourth place in the women's +65 kg event at the 2024 Summer Paralympics in Paris, France.

In 2019, she won the silver medal in the women's +58 kg event at the Parapan American Games held in Lima, Peru.

== Personal life ==
Menezes is openly lesbian.
