= Guljonoy Naimova =

Uzbekistani para taekwondo practitioner

Personal information
- Born: 1 January 2001 (age 25)

Sport
- Country: Uzbekistan
- Sport: Para taekwondo
Medal record
Women's Para Taekwondo
Representing Uzbekistan
Summer Paralympics
Gold medal – first place	2020 Tokyo	+58 kg
Silver medal – second place	2024 Paris	+65 kg
Asian Para Games
Gold medal – first place	2022 Hangzhou	+65 kg

Guljonoy Naimova (born 1 January 2001) is an Uzbekistani para taekwondo practitioner. She won the gold medal in the women's +58 kg event at the 2020 Summer Paralympics in Tokyo, Japan.

She won the silver medal in the women's K44 +65 kg category losing in the final to Amy Truesdale.
