= Thailand at the 2008 Summer Paralympics =

- IPC code: THA
- NPC: Paralympic Committee of Thailand
- Website: www.paralympicthai.com (in Thai and English)

in Beijing
- Competitors: 40 in 10 sports
- Medals Ranked 41st: Gold 1 Silver 5 Bronze 7 Total 13

Summer Paralympics appearances (overview)
- 1984; 1988; 1992; 1996; 2000; 2004; 2008; 2012; 2016; 2020; 2024

Thailand competed at the 2008 Summer Paralympics in Beijing, China.

== Medalists ==
Medal	Name	Sport	Event
Gold	Prawat Wahoram	Athletics	Men's 5000m T54
Silver	Prawat Wahoram	Athletics	Men's 1500m T54
Silver	Saichon Konjen	Athletics	Men's 200m T54
Silver	Saichon Konjen	Athletics	Men's 100m T54
Silver	Saichon Konjen; Supachai Koysub; Pichet Krungget; Prawat Wahoram	Athletics	Men's 4 × 400 m Relay T53/T54
Silver	Saichon Konjen; Supachai Koysub; Pichet Krungget; Prawat Wahoram	Athletics	Men's 4 × 100 m Relay T53/T54
Bronze	Saysunne Jana	Wheelchair Fencing	Women's Individual Épée Category B
Bronze	Samkhoun Anon	Powerlifting	Women's -52 kg
Bronze	Saichon Konjen	Athletics	Men's 400m T54
Bronze	Prawat Wahoram	Athletics	Men's 800m T54
Bronze	Narong Kasanun	Powerlifting	Men's -52 kg
Bronze	Supachai Koysub	Athletics	Men's 100m T54
Bronze	Peth Rungsri	Athletics	Men's 200m T52

== Sports ==
=== Archery ===
Athlete	Event	Ranking round		Round of 32	Round of 16	Quarterfinals	Semifinals	Finals	
Athlete	Event	Score	Seed	Opposition score	Opposition score	Opposition score	Opposition score	Opposition score	Rank
Sakon Inkaew	Men's individual recurve W1/W2	597	12	R Olejnik (POL); W 102-89	Onodera (JPN); W 100-96	Meunier (FRA); L 99-103	did not advance		
Sathien Phimthong	Men's individual recurve standing	578	18	Sawicki (POL); L 89-104	did not advance				
Suthi Raksamai	Men's individual recurve standing	550	27	Tseng L H (TPE); L 85-104	did not advance				
Sakon Inkaew; Sathien Phimthong; Suthi Raksamai	Men's team recurve	1725	7	—N/a	Great Britain (GBR); W 185-158	Italy (ITA); L 202-206	did not advance		

=== Athletics ===
==== Men's track ====
Athlete	Class	Event	Heats		Semifinal		Final	
Athlete	Class	Event	Result	Rank	Result	Rank	Result	Rank
Sopa Intasen	T53	100m	15.72	7 q	—N/a		15.20	4
Sopa Intasen	T53	200m	28.58	13	did not advance			
Sopa Intasen	T53	400m	53.76	14	did not advance			
Sopa Intasen	T53	800m	1:43.84	14	did not advance			
Ekkachai Janthon	T54	100m	15.48	18	did not advance			
Ekkachai Janthon	T54	400m	51.26	23	did not advance			
Ekkachai Janthon	T54	1500m	3:07.69	3 Q	3:02.30	10	did not advance	
Ekkachai Janthon	T54	5000m	10:51.15	18	did not advance			
Ekkachai Janthon	T54	Marathon	—N/a				1:03:30	19
Kitsana Jorchuy	T11	400m	56.78	12	did not advance			
Saichon Konjen	T54	100m	14.15 PR	2 Q	—N/a		14.04	2nd place, silver medalist(s)
Saichon Konjen	T54	200m	25.33	4 Q	—N/a		25.15	2nd place, silver medalist(s)
Saichon Konjen	T54	400m	48.03	4 Q	48.39	2 Q	46.86	3rd place, bronze medalist(s)
Supachai Koysub	T54	100m	14.32	4 Q	—N/a		14.22	3rd place, bronze medalist(s)
Supachai Koysub	T54	200m	25.79	9	did not advance			
Supachai Koysub	T54	400m	49.32	9 Q	48.75	5 Q	48.39	6
Pichet Krungget	T53	100m	15.41	5 Q	—N/a		15.20	5
Pichet Krungget	T53	200m	28.03	11	did not advance			
Pichet Krungget	T53	400m	53.71	13	did not advance			
Pichet Krungget	T53	800m	1:45.92	15	did not advance			
Jakkrit Punthong	T11	100m	12.23	22	did not advance			
Peth Rungsri	T52	100m	—N/a				18.87	6
Peth Rungsri	T52	200m	—N/a				32.07	3rd place, bronze medalist(s)
Peth Rungsri	T52	400m	1:01.57	5 Q	—N/a		1:02.12	5
Peth Rungsri	T52	800m	2:08.61	7 Q	—N/a		2:10.83	8
Ampai Sualuang	T54	800m	1:37.54	7 q	1:41.20	16	did not advance	
Ampai Sualuang	T54	1500m	3:17.72	22 Q	3:09.37	13	did not advance	
Ampai Sualuang	T54	5000m	10:53.53	21	did not advance			
Khachonsak Thamsophon	T54	800m	1:40.22	15 q	1:40.37	8 Q	1:38.73	8
Khachonsak Thamsophon	T54	Marathon	—N/a				1:30:31	212
Prawat Wahoram	T54	800m	1:38.84	11 Q	1:34.59	2 Q	1:37.12	3rd place, bronze medalist(s)
Prawat Wahoram	T54	1500m	3:09.24	8 Q	3:00.10 PR	1 Q	3:10.68	2nd place, silver medalist(s)
Prawat Wahoram	T54	5000m	10:21.31	8 Q	—N/a		10:22.38	1st place, gold medalist(s)
Prawat Wahoram	T54	Marathon	—N/a				DNF	
Saichon Konjen; Supachai Koysub; Pichet Krungget; Prawat Wahoram	T53-54	4x100m relay	50.71	2 Q	—N/a		51.93	2nd place, silver medalist(s)
Saichon Konjen; Supachai Koysub; Pichet Krungget; Prawat Wahoram	T53-54	4x400m relay	3:15.65	2 Q	—N/a		3:11.63	2nd place, silver medalist(s)

=== Boccia ===
Athlete	Event	Preliminaries			Quarterfinals	Semifinals	Final	
Athlete	Event	Opponent	Opposition Score	Rank	Opposition Score	Opposition Score	Opposition Score	Rank
Akarapol Punsnit	Mixed individual BC3	Park K W (KOR)	L 2-8	4	did not advance			
Akarapol Punsnit	Mixed individual BC3	Shen C (CHN)	W 5-4	4	did not advance			
Akarapol Punsnit	Mixed individual BC3	Martino (CAN)	L 2-3	4	did not advance			
Vilasinee Sukkarath	Mixed individual BC3	Polychronidis (GRE)	L 0-7	2	did not advance			
Vilasinee Sukkarath	Mixed individual BC3	Dijkstra (NZL)	W 5-4	2	did not advance			
Vilasinee Sukkarath	Mixed individual BC3	Zhu H (CHN)	W 4-1	2	did not advance			
Tanimpat Visaratanunta	Mixed individual BC3	Jeong H W (KOR)	L 3-5	3	did not advance			
Tanimpat Visaratanunta	Mixed individual BC3	Peixoto (POR)	L 0-5	3	did not advance			
Tanimpat Visaratanunta	Mixed individual BC3	Slade (NZL)	W 11-0	3	did not advance			
Akarapol Punsnit; Vilasinee Sukkarath; Tanimpat Visaratanunta	Pairs BC3	Portugal (POR)	L 1-7	2 Q	—N/a	South Korea (KOR); L 0-15	Portugal (POR); L 1-4	4
Akarapol Punsnit; Vilasinee Sukkarath; Tanimpat Visaratanunta	Pairs BC3	Greece (GRE)	W 5-2	2 Q	—N/a	South Korea (KOR); L 0-15	Portugal (POR); L 1-4	4
Akarapol Punsnit; Vilasinee Sukkarath; Tanimpat Visaratanunta	Pairs BC3	New Zealand (NZL)	L 2-4	2 Q	—N/a	South Korea (KOR); L 0-15	Portugal (POR); L 1-4	4

=== Judo ===
Athlete	Event	First Round	Quarterfinals	Semifinals	Repechage round 1	Repechage round 2	Final/ Bronze medal contest
Athlete	Event	Opposition Result	Opposition Result	Opposition Result	Opposition Result	Opposition Result	Opposition Result
Kannika Aimthisung	Women's 63kg	Bye	Kazakova (RUS); L 0000–1000	—N/a	Bye	Quessandier (FRA); L 0000-1000	Did not advance

=== Powerlifting ===
==== Men ====
Athlete	Event	Result	Rank
Narong Kasanun	52kg	167.5	3rd place, bronze medalist(s)
Thongsa Marasri	56kg	180.0	4
Choochat Sukjarern	48kg	155.0	5
Prasit Thongdee	60kg	160.0	7

==== Women ====
Athlete	Event	Result	Rank
Samkhoun Anon	52kg	95.0	3rd place, bronze medalist(s)
Arawan Bootpo	60kg	100.0	5
Phikul Chareonying	44kg	75.0	6

=== Shooting ===
Athlete	Event	Qualification		Final		
Athlete	Event	Score	Rank	Score	Total	Rank
Sungvoy Makcium	Mixed 10m air rifle prone SH1	593	35	did not advance		

=== Swimming ===
==== Men ====
Athlete	Class	Event	Heats		Final	
Athlete	Class	Event	Result	Rank	Result	Rank
Somchai Duangkeaw	S5	50m butterfly	50.43	12	did not advance	
Rattaporn Jearchan	S11	100m backstroke	1:17.64	9	did not advance	
Voravit Kaewkham	S5	50m butterfly	42.75	5 Q	40.78	5
Panom Lagsanaprim	SB11	100m breaststroke	1:18.91	6 Q	1:21.13	7
Prasit Marnnok	S11	400m freestyle	5:57.49	13	did not advance	
Prasit Marnnok	SB11	100m breaststroke	1:27.73	11	did not advance	
Prajim Rieangsantiea	S6	100m backstroke	1:31.55	10	did not advance	
Taweesook Samuksaneeto	SB5	100m breaststroke	1:51.18	11	did not advance	
Kitipong Sriboonrueng	S12	100m butterfly	1:13.17	12	did not advance	
Kitipong Sriboonrueng	SB12	100m breaststroke	1:18.56	9	did not advance	

=== Table tennis ===
Athlete	Event	Preliminaries				Quarterfinals	Semifinals	Final / BM	
Athlete	Event	Opposition Result	Opposition Result	Opposition Result	Rank	Opposition Result	Opposition Result	Opposition Result	Rank
Wanchai Chaiwut	Men's singles C4-5	Zhang Y (CHN); L 0–3	Lin Y H (TPE); L 0–3	—N/a	3	did not advance			
Rungroj Thainiyom	Men's singles C6	Blok (NED); L 0-3	Jensen (DEN); L 1-3	Itkonen (SWE); W 3-0	3	did not advance			

=== Wheelchair fencing ===
Athlete	Event	Qualification			Round of 16	Quarterfinal	Semifinal	Final / BM	
Athlete	Event	Opposition	Score	Rank	Opposition Score	Opposition Score	Opposition Score	Opposition Score	Rank
Korakod Saengsawang	Men's épée A	Maillard (FRA)	L 4–5	5 Q	Alhaddad (KUW); W 15–9	Zhang L (CHN); L 9-15	did not advance		
Korakod Saengsawang	Men's épée A	Pylarinos Markantonatos (GRE)	L 1-5	5 Q	Alhaddad (KUW); W 15–9	Zhang L (CHN); L 9-15	did not advance		
Korakod Saengsawang	Men's épée A	Alhaddad (KUW)	L 4-5	5 Q	Alhaddad (KUW); W 15–9	Zhang L (CHN); L 9-15	did not advance		
Korakod Saengsawang	Men's épée A	Davydenko (UKR)	L 5-0	5 Q	Alhaddad (KUW); W 15–9	Zhang L (CHN); L 9-15	did not advance		
Korakod Saengsawang	Men's épée A	L Sanchez (ESP)	W 5-0	5 Q	Alhaddad (KUW); W 15–9	Zhang L (CHN); L 9-15	did not advance		
Korakod Saengsawang	Men's épée A	Serafini (ITA)	W 5-3	5 Q	Alhaddad (KUW); W 15–9	Zhang L (CHN); L 9-15	did not advance		
Korakod Saengsawang	Men's foil A	Zhang L (CHN)	L 1-5	6	did not advance				
Korakod Saengsawang	Men's foil A	Betti (ITA)	L 2-5	6	did not advance				
Korakod Saengsawang	Men's foil A	Alqallaf (KUW)	L 1-5	6	did not advance				
Korakod Saengsawang	Men's foil A	Horvath (HUN)	L 1-5	6	did not advance				
Korakod Saengsawang	Men's foil A	Granell (ESP)	L 4-5	6	did not advance				
Korakod Saengsawang	Men's foil A	Andree (GER)	W 5-3	6	did not advance				
Saysunee Jana	Women's épée B	Chan Y C (HKG)	W 5-1	1 Q	—N/a	Palfi (HUN); W 15-4	Chan Y C (HKG); L 8-15	Vasilyeva (RUS); W 15-8	3rd place, bronze medalist(s)
Saysunee Jana	Women's épée B	Ye H (CHN)	W 5-3	1 Q	—N/a	Palfi (HUN); W 15-4	Chan Y C (HKG); L 8-15	Vasilyeva (RUS); W 15-8	3rd place, bronze medalist(s)
Saysunee Jana	Women's épée B	Dani (HUN)	W 5-0	1 Q	—N/a	Palfi (HUN); W 15-4	Chan Y C (HKG); L 8-15	Vasilyeva (RUS); W 15-8	3rd place, bronze medalist(s)
Saysunee Jana	Women's épée B	Lukianenko (UKR)	W 5-0	1 Q	—N/a	Palfi (HUN); W 15-4	Chan Y C (HKG); L 8-15	Vasilyeva (RUS); W 15-8	3rd place, bronze medalist(s)
Saysunee Jana	Women's épée B	Hassen Bey (ESP)	W 5-1	1 Q	—N/a	Palfi (HUN); W 15-4	Chan Y C (HKG); L 8-15	Vasilyeva (RUS); W 15-8	3rd place, bronze medalist(s)
Saysunee Jana	Women's foil B	Chan Y C (HKG)	L 2-5	3 Q	—N/a	Dani (HUN); W 15-8	Yao F (CHN); L 11-15	Ye H (CHN); L 14-15	4
Saysunee Jana	Women's foil B	Ye H (CHN)	W 5-4	3 Q	—N/a	Dani (HUN); W 15-8	Yao F (CHN); L 11-15	Ye H (CHN); L 14-15	4
Saysunee Jana	Women's foil B	Palfi (HUN)	W 5-1	3 Q	—N/a	Dani (HUN); W 15-8	Yao F (CHN); L 11-15	Ye H (CHN); L 14-15	4
Saysunee Jana	Women's foil B	Vasilyeva (RUS)	W 5-1	3 Q	—N/a	Dani (HUN); W 15-8	Yao F (CHN); L 11-15	Ye H (CHN); L 14-15	4
Saysunee Jana	Women's foil B	Demello (USA)	W 5-0	3 Q	—N/a	Dani (HUN); W 15-8	Yao F (CHN); L 11-15	Ye H (CHN); L 14-15	4

=== Wheelchair tennis ===
Athlete	Event	Round of 64	Round of 32	Round of 16	Quarterfinals	Semifinals	Finals
Athlete	Event	Opposition Result	Opposition Result	Opposition Result	Opposition Result	Opposition Result	Opposition Result
Suthi Khulongrua	Men's singles	Mazzei (ITA); W 6-7, 6-2, 6-3	Houdet (FRA); L 1-6, 0-6	did not advance			
Sumrerng Kruamai	Men's singles	Peifer (FRA); L 2-6, 2-6	did not advance				
Suthi Khulongrua; Sumrerng Kruamai	Men's doubles	—N/a	Cayulef (CHI) / Mendez (CHI); W 6-0, 6-2	Lee H G (KOR) / Oh S-h (KOR); L 2-6, 3-6	did not advance		

== See also ==
- Thailand at the Paralympics
- Thailand at the 2008 Summer Olympics
