= Ghana at the 2020 Summer Paralympics =

- IPC code: GHA
- NPC: National Paralympic Committee of Ghana

in Tokyo
- Competitors: 3 in 3 sports
- Flag bearer: Emmanuel Nii Tettey Oku
- Medals: Gold 0 Silver 0 Bronze 0 Total 0

Summer Paralympics appearances (overview)
- 2004; 2008; 2012; 2016; 2020; 2024

Ghana competed at the 2020 Summer Paralympics in Tokyo, Japan, from 24 August to 5 September 2021.

== Athletics ==
One Ghanaian male athlete, Botsyo Nkegbe (100m T54), successfully to break through the qualifications for the 2020 Paralympics after breaking the qualification limit.

== Cycling ==
Ghana sent one cyclist, blind tandem cyclist Frederick Assor, after successfully getting a slot in the 2018 UCI Nations Ranking Allocation quota for the African Continental.

== Powerlifting ==
Emmanuel Nii Tettey Oku represented Ghana and competed in the men's 72 kg event.

== See also ==
- Ghana at the Paralympics
- Ghana at the 2020 Summer Olympics
