= Ghana at the 2016 Summer Paralympics =

- IPC code: GHA
- NPC: National Paralympic Committee of Ghana

in Rio de Janeiro
- Competitors: 3 in 3 sports
- Medals: Gold 0 Silver 0 Bronze 0 Total 0

Summer Paralympics appearances (overview)
- 2004; 2008; 2012; 2016; 2020; 2024

Ghana competed at the 2016 Summer Paralympics in Rio de Janeiro, Brazil, from 7 to 18 September 2016.

== Background ==
Wheelchairs, especially specialized ones, are very expensive in Ghana. Their high cost makes it cost prohibitive for many Ghanaians with disabilities to get into sport, especially as they often use cheap, home manufactured wheelchairs to get around. The infrastructure in Ghana also makes it difficult for people with wheelchairs to get out into society as there are few ramps and handicap accessible locations. This makes it hard to develop elite disability sport in the country to compete at the Paralympic level.

== Funding and support ==
NPC Ghana has created a program to support efforts by its Paralympians called the “Right to Dream” which provides regular funding to support athletes in their efforts to compete internationally, and not just at key Paralympic qualifying events.

== Disability classifications ==
Every participant at the Paralympics has their disability grouped into one of five disability categories; amputation, the condition may be congenital or sustained through injury or illness; cerebral palsy; wheelchair athletes, there is often overlap between this and other categories; visual impairment, including blindness; Les autres, any physical disability that does not fall strictly under one of the other categories, for example dwarfism or multiple sclerosis. Each Paralympic sport then has its own classifications, dependent upon the specific physical demands of competition. Events are given a code, made of numbers and letters, describing the type of event and classification of the athletes competing. Some sports, such as athletics, divide athletes by both the category and severity of their disabilities, other sports, for example swimming, group competitors from different categories together, the only separation being based on the severity of the disability.

== Athletics ==
Men's Field

| Athlete | Events | Result | Rank |
|---|---|---|---|
| Yusif Amadu | High Jump F42 | 1.68 | 11 |

== Cycling ==
=== Road ===
| Athlete | Event | Time | Rank |
|---|---|---|---|
| Mumuni Alem | Men's road time trial C2 | 36:10.85 | 15 |

=== Track ===
Pursuits and time trials

| Athlete | Event | Qualification | | Final | |
| Athlete | Event | Time | Rank | Opposition Time | Rank |
|---|---|---|---|---|---|
| Mumuni Alem | Men's individual pursuit C2 | 4:59.965 | 10 | did not advance | |

== Powerlifting ==
| Athlete | Event | Result | Rank |
|---|---|---|---|
| Charles Teye | Men's −80 kg | 160 | 9 |

== See also ==
- Ghana at the 2016 Summer Olympics
