= Arndt Mallepree =

German taekwondo athlete and world champion

Sport
- Country: Germany
- Sport: Taekwondo; Jeet Kune Do
- Event: Traditional Poomsae
- Club: An-Do Wattenscheid e.V.
- Coached by: Bernhard Thomys; Dan Inosanto

Achievements and titles
- World finals: 1st place, gold medalist(s)
- Regional finals: 1st place, gold medalist(s)
- Highest world ranking: 1 (2025, 2026)
Medal record
Men's Taekwondo
Representing Germany
World Championships
Gold medal – first place	2023 Veracruz	Poomsae, P34
Gold medal – first place	2024 Manama	Poomsae, P34
European Championships
Gold medal – first place	2023 Innsbruck	Poomsae, P34
Gold medal – first place	2025 Tallinn	Poomsae, P34

Arndt Mallepree (born 1970 or 1971) is a German taekwondo athlete and two-time world champion as well as two-time European champion in para poomsae.

== Taekwondo career ==
Arndt Mallepree began practising the Korean martial art of taekwondo in 1989 after first trying out judo and jujutsu. He has been training at the An-Do Wattenscheid e.V. sports club in Bochum since 1998.

In 2013, Malleepree suffered eight strokes following an accident. After the subsequent hospitalisation and rehabilitation, he began taking part in taekwondo poomsae competitions. Due to lingering trauma caused by the strokes, he competes in the P34 class, which comprises athletes with moderate physical impairments affecting one or both sides of the body.

In 2023, Malleepree became world champion in the P34 competition for men aged 30 and over at the World Para Championships in Veracruz. At the 2023 European Championships in Innsbruck, he also became European Champion in the P34 competition.

Additionally to practising taekwondo and working as a coach at his club, Mallepree is an associated instructor in Jeet Kune Do und Kali, having studied directly under Daniel Arca Inosanto. He participated at the 2024 World Para Poomsae Championships held in Bahrain, where he won the senior male P34 competition and therefore defended his title as world champion. At the 2025 European Para Poomsae Championships, he also became European Champion for a second time.

== Personal life ==
Mallepree is a police officer and chief of the Bochum police homicide squad.
