= Eleni Papastamatopoulou =

Greek para taekwondo practitioner

Personal information
- Native name: Ελένη Παπασταματοπούλου
- Born: 21 July 2002 (age 23) Ioannina, Greece

Sport
- Country: Greece
- Sport: Para taekwondo
- Weight class: +65 kg
Medal record
Women's para-taekwondo
Representing Greece
Paralympic Games
Bronze medal – third place	2024 Paris	+65 kg

Eleni Papastamatopoulou (Greek: Ελένη Παπασταματοπούλου; born 21 July 2002) is a Greek para taekwondo practitioner. She competed at the 2024 Summer Paralympics where she won a bronze medal in the women's +65 kg event.

== Personal ==
She is from Aitoliko, and she was born and lives in Ioannina. In 2024 she was at the 5th year of the medical school.
