= Yu Shiran =

Chinese Paralympic athlete

Medal record

Track and field (T53)

Representing China

Paralympic Games
Gold medal – first place	2008 Beijing	200m – T53
Bronze medal – third place	2008 Beijing	100m – T53

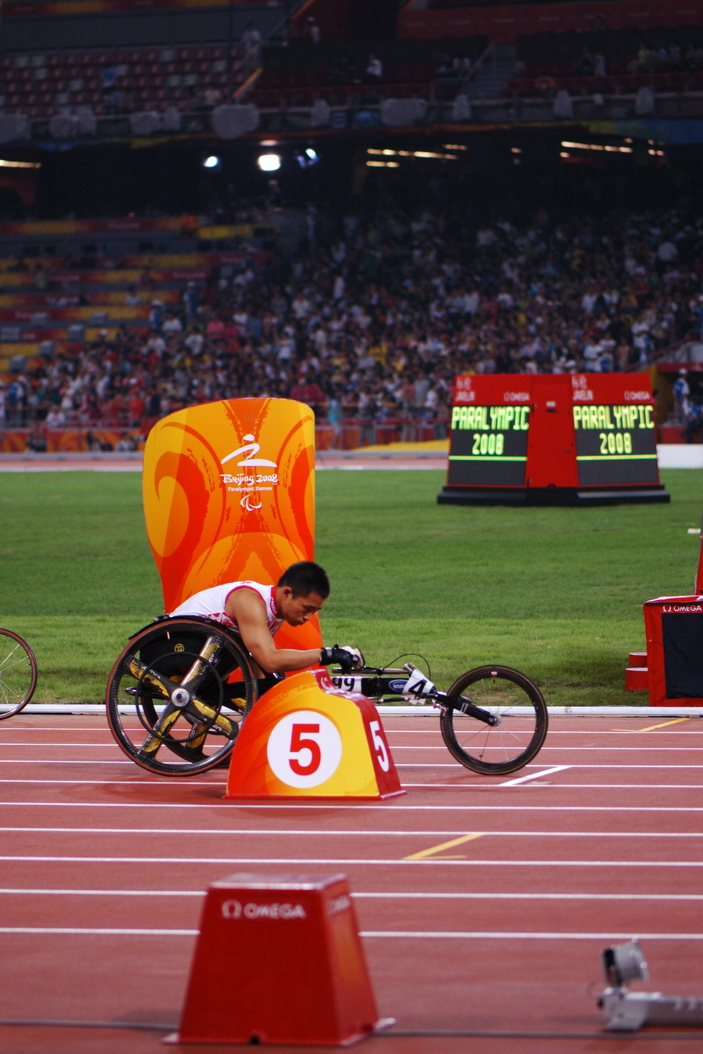
Yu Shiran at the 2008 Summer Paralympics

Yu Shiran is a Paralympian athlete from China competing mainly in category T53 sprint events.

He competed in the 2008 Summer Paralympics in Beijing, China. There he won a gold medal in the men's 200 metres – T53 event, a bronze medal in the men's 100 metres – T53 event and went out in the first round of the men's 400 metres – T53 event
