= Rajae Akermach =

Moroccan para taekwondo practitioner

Personal information
- Born: 15 July 1997 (age 28)

Sport
- Country: Morocco
- Sport: Para taekwondo
- Weight class: +65 kg
Medal record
Women's para-taekwondo
Representing Morocco
Paralympic Games
Bronze medal – third place	2024 Paris	+65 kg

Rajae Akermach (born 15 July 1997) is a Moroccan para taekwondo practitioner. She won a bronze medal at the 2024 Summer Paralympics in the women's +65 kg event.

In 2017, Akermach was the first African woman to top the world rankings in para taekwondo.
