= Amy Truesdale =

British para taekwondo practitioner

Amy Truesdale MBE
Personal information
- Born: 20 January 1989 (age 37) Chester, England

Sport
- Sport: Para Taekwondo
Medal record
Women's para taekwondo
Representing Great Britain
Paralympic Games
Gold medal – first place	2024 Paris	+65 kg
Bronze medal – third place	2020 Tokyo	+58 kg
European Championships
Gold medal – first place	2026 Munich	K44 +65 kg
European Para Championships
Silver medal – second place	2023 Rotterdam	K44 +65 kg
European Taekwondo Championships
Gold medal – first place	2024 Belgrade	K44 +65 kg

Amy Truesdale (born 20 January 1989) is a British para taekwondo practitioner who won a gold medal at the 2024 Summer Paralympics.

== Career ==
Truesdale was born without a left hand or forearm. She has been a competitor in Para Taekwondo since 2009.

She won gold at the 2014 and 2017 Para Taekwondo World Championships and bronze in the women's +58 kg event at the delayed 2020 Summer Paralympics in Tokyo, Japan.

Truesdale won gold at the 2024 Summer Paralympics in Paris, France, defeating Uzbekistan's Guljonoy Naimova in the final of the K44 +65 kg category.
