= Mauro Máximo de Jesús =

Mexican Paralympic athlete

Medal record

Representing Mexico

Paralympic athletics

Paralympic Games
Gold medal – first place	2004 Athens	Shot put F53
Gold medal – first place	2008 Beijing	Shot put F53/54
Silver medal – second place	2000 Sydney	Shot put F53
Silver medal – second place	2000 Sydney	Javelin throw F53
Silver medal – second place	2012 London	Shot put F52/53
Bronze medal – third place	1996 Atlanta	Shot put F52

Parapan American Games
Gold medal – first place	2011 Guadalajara	Shot put F52/53
Gold medal – first place	2011 Guadalajara	Javelin throw F52/53
Silver medal – second place	2007 Rio de Janeiro	Shot put F53-55

Mauro Máximo de Jesús (born 13 February 1957 in Aculco) is a Paralympian athlete from Mexico who has competed mainly in category F53 throwing events.

== Biography ==
He competed in all three F52 throws at the 1996 Summer Paralympics in Atlanta, United States winning a bronze medal in the shot put. In Sydney, Australia in 2004 Summer Paralympics he won two silvers in the F53 shot put and javelin. In 2004 he improved his shot put to win the gold medal in the F53 class but this time failed to medal in either the F52-53 javelin or F53 discus. In 2008 Summer Paralympics he defended his shot put gold medal in the F53/54 class but again failed to medal in the F53/54 javelin. In the 2012 Summer Paralympics in London, United Kingdom, he won the silver medal in the shot put in the F52/53 category.
