= Bree Mellberg =

Australian wheelchair basketball player (born 1990)

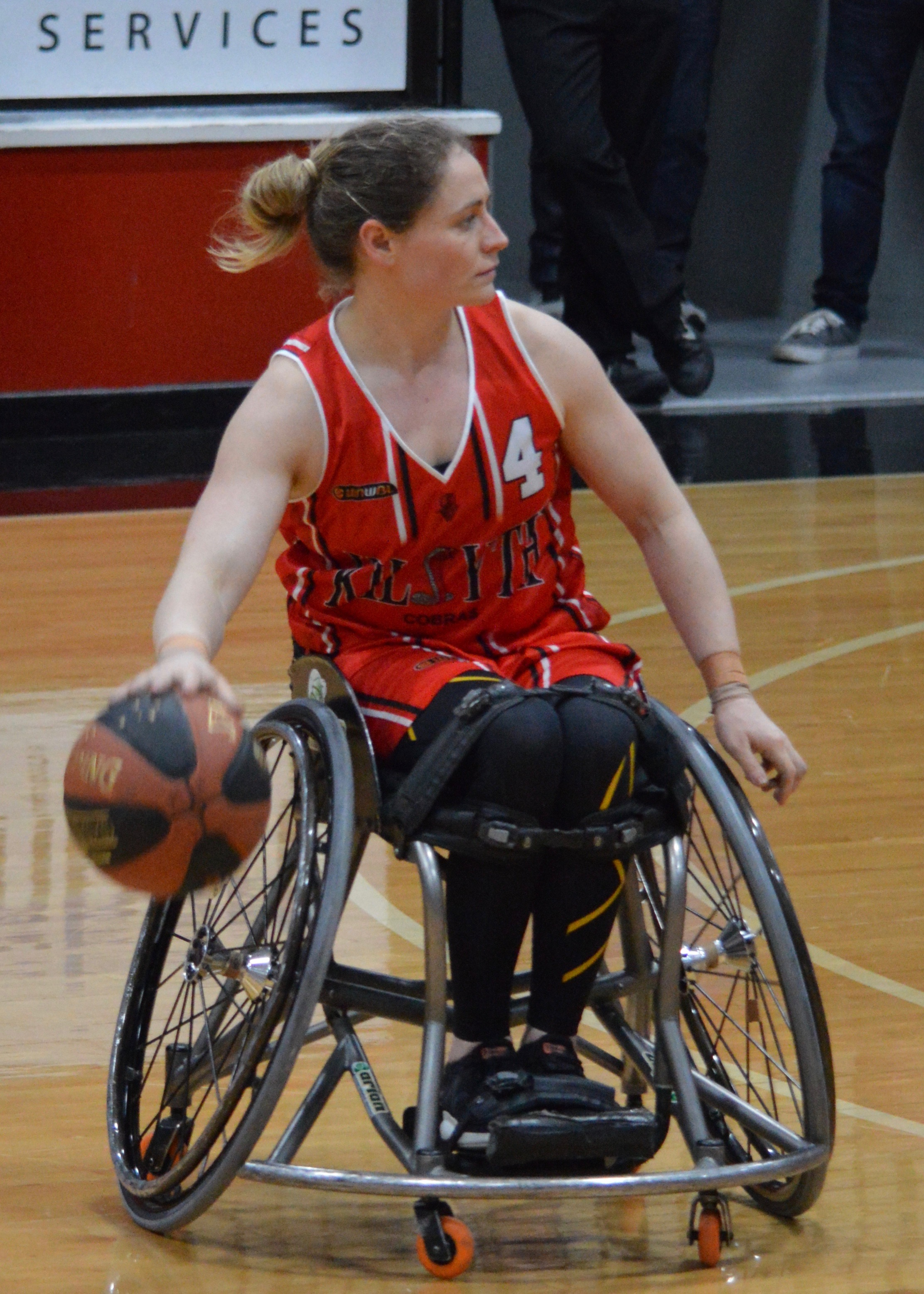
- Bree Mellberg at the Kilsyth Sports Centre in August 2019

Personal information
- Nationality: Australia
- Born: 14 April 1990 (age 36)

Sport
- Country: Australia
- Sport: Wheelchair basketball
- Disability class: 3
- Event: Women's team
- Club: Kilsyth Cobras

Bree Mellberg (born 14 April 1990) is an Australian diver and 3 point wheelchair basketball player. A national junior champion, she represented Australia at the FINA world junior diving championships in September 2008. After switching to wheelchair basketball, she made her international debut with the Australian women's national wheelchair basketball team (the Gliders) at the Osaka Cup in February 2017. She represented Australia at the 2020 Summer Paralympics in Tokyo.

== Biography ==
Bree Mellberg was born on 14 April 1990. In a ceremony on International Women's Day in March 2016, she was awarded the Anne Horrocks STEM award, a scholarship supports women who wish to pursue studies in science, technology and maths. She has completed a Bachelor of Biomedical Science with Honours at La Trobe University’s Bendigo Campus and in 2021 undertaking a PhD at La Trobe University.

=== Diving ===
Mellberg began training in gymnastics at the Bendigo Gymnastics Centre. She then took up diving in 2005. At the Australian Age Group Diving Championships in Adelaide in 2006, she won bronze in the one metre springboard, the three metre springboard, and synchro, and was fourth on platform, leading to her being ranked no. 2 in Australia in her 16-18 age group. She initially attended Bendigo Senior Secondary College, where she was coached by Heather Tyler, but, with her sights on qualifying for the Olympics, she moved to Melbourne to study at Mullauna College so she could be closer to the Aquanation diving facilities in Ringwood, Victoria, and her new coach, Max Swain. She trained with the Ringwood Diving Club.

At the 2006 national schools diving championships at Homebush Bay in Sydney, she came fifth in the 16-year-old girls' springboard, and fourth in the girls' aged 15–19 platform. Competing in the Australian Open Championships in January 2008, she was placed ninth in the one and three metre springboard events and twelfth in the platform. At the Australian junior elite diving titles at the Melbourne Sports and Aquatic Centre in June 2008, she came second in the 10 metre platform and won the 3 metre synchro with Olivia Wright. Her score was sufficiently good to qualify for the FINA world junior diving championships in Aachen, Germany in September 2008. She was presented with the Ron Masters award in January 2009.

=== Wheelchair basketball ===
Mellberg's diving career ended in January 2013 when she broke her neck in a trampoline accident. Initially bedridden, after a great deal of rehabilitation she recovered sufficiently to literally and figuratively stand on her own two feet again, moving out of home and resuming her university studies. Part of her recovery was taking up wheelchair basketball. "It was very challenging to do a lot of things, to feel very trapped in your body," she recalled, "I feel that playing wheelchair basketball helps with that, it's a bit of an adrenaline rush, it feels like I'm able to do a bit more, gives me a bit more freedom." She is classified as a 3.5 point player.

At the Women's Festival of Wheelchair Basketball in Narrabeen, New South Wales, in 2015, Mellberg won the Emerging Glider award. She played for the Kilsyth Cobras in the Women's National Wheelchair Basketball League in 2016, and made her international debut with the Australian women's national wheelchair basketball team (the Gliders) at the Osaka Cup in Japan in February 2017. In May 2017, she was selected in the Gliders team to play in the World Super Cup in Germany and the Netherlands, and the Continental Clash with Germany, Japan and Great Britain.

At the 2020 Tokyo Paralympics, the Gliders finished ninth after winning the 9th-10th classification match.
