= Raphael Botsyo Nkegbe =

Ghanaian Paralympic athlete

Personal information
- Born: 2 July 1979 (age 47) Sunyani, Ghana

Sport
- Country: Ghana
- Sport: Paralympic athlete
- Disability: Polio
- Disability class: T54

Raphael Botsyo Nkegbe (born 2 July 1979) is a Paralympic athlete from Ghana competing in T54 wheelchair racing events at international track and field competitions. His four Paralympics appearances came at the 2004, 2008, 2012 and 2020 Summer Paralympics.

Nkegbe set a new African record of 14.22s in the 100m T54 at the Desert Challenge Games in Arizona, USA while he became the first Ghanaian to qualify for the 2020 Summer Paralympics.
