= Marc Schuh =

German wheelchair sprinter (born 1989)

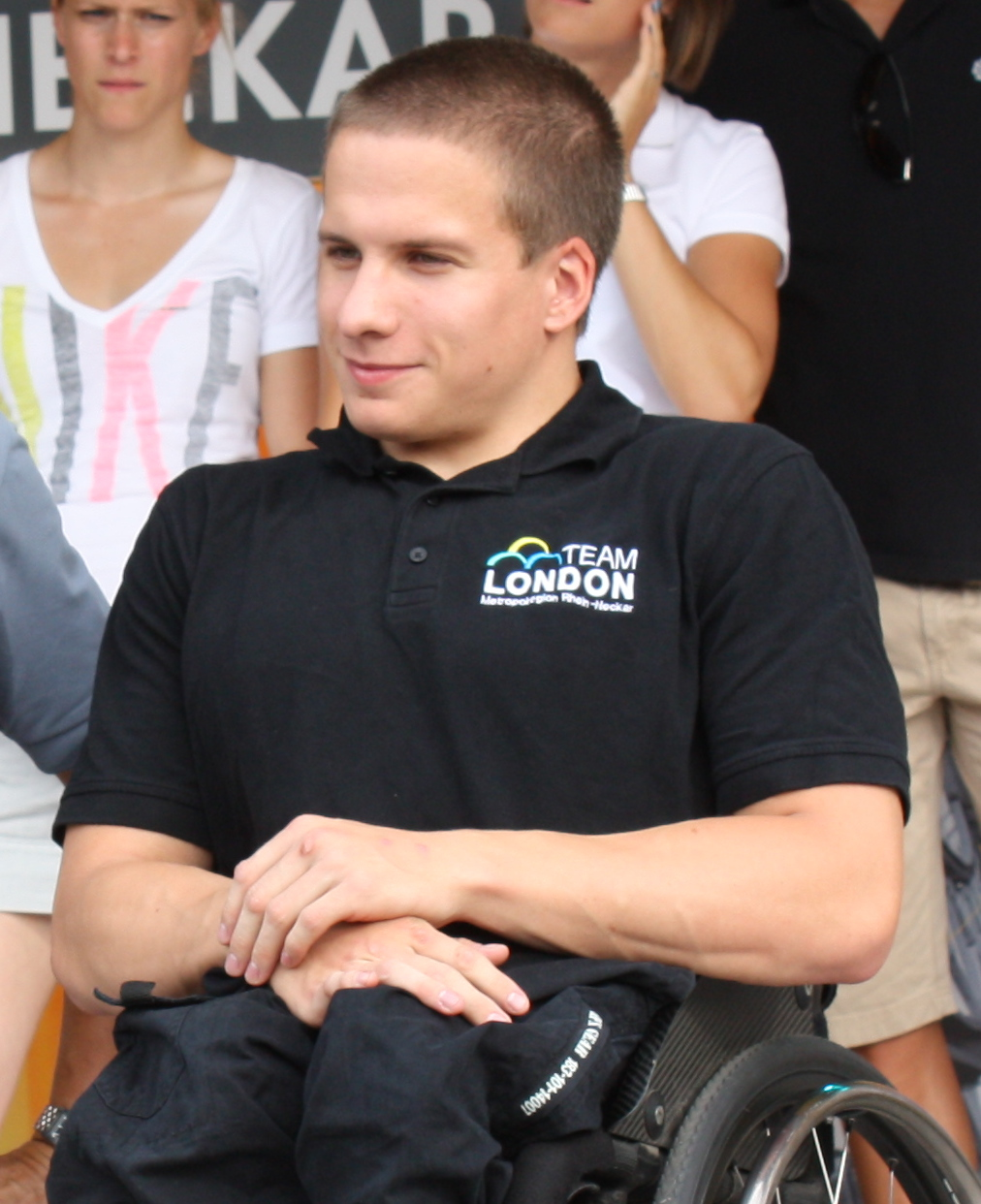
- Schuh in 2012

Personal information
- Full name: Marc Andre Schuh
- Nationality: German
- Born: 12 August 1989 (age 36) Bergisch Gladbach, Germany

Sport
- Disability class: T54
Medal record
Men's wheelchair racing
Representing Germany
Event	1st	2nd	3rd
World Championships	1	1	3
European Championships	0	1	4
World Youth Championships	10	0	0
Total	11	2	6
IPC Athletics World Championships
Gold medal – first place	2009 Bangalore	400 m T54
Bronze medal – third place	2011 Christchurch	400 m T54
Silver medal – second place	2013 Lyon	400 m T54
Bronze medal – third place	2013 Lyon	100 m T54
IPC European Championships
Silver medal – second place	2014 Swansea	400 m T54
Bronze medal – third place	2012 Stadskanaal	100 T54
Bronze medal – third place	2014 Swansea	100 m T54
Bronze medal – third place	2014 Swansea	200 m T54
Bronze medal – third place	2014 Swansea	800 m T54
Junior World Championships
Gold medal – first place	2008 New Brunswick	100 m T54
Gold medal – first place	2008 New Brunswick	200 m T54
Gold medal – first place	2008 New Brunswick	400 m T54
Gold medal – first place	2009 Nottwil	100 m T54
Gold medal – first place	2009 Nottwil	200 m T54
Gold medal – first place	2009 Nottwil	400 m T54
Gold medal – first place	2009 Nottwil	4x100 m T53/T54 relay
Gold medal – first place	2010 Olomouc	100 m T54
Gold medal – first place	2010 Olomouc	200 m T54
Gold medal – first place	2010 Olomouc	400 m T54

Marc Andre Schuh (born 12 August 1989 in Bergisch Gladbach) is a German wheelchair sprinter.

== Life ==
Marc Schuh was born with a spine malformation which keeps him from walking. He finished gymnasium with Abitur in 2007 at the Otto-Hahn-Gymnasium in Bensberg as best of the year in chemistry and physics. In the same year he started his studies at the University of Heidelberg majoring physics. In 2012 he finished his bachelor's degree and started his master, which he finished in 2014; his master thesis is about Simulations of the electrostatic and magnetic field properties and tests of the Penning-ion source at THe-Trap. In November 2014 he became a Ph.D. student at the Max-Planck-Institut für Kernphysik in the group Klaus Blaum at The-Trap experiment. The goal of the experiment was to improve the Q-value of Tritium by using Penning-traps. He finished his PhD in May 2019 with the thesis titled "Simulations of the image charge effect in high-precision Penningtraps and the new IGISOL ionbuncher". Currently he is working as an IT consultant in Munich.

== Successes ==
After trying wheelchair basketball and wheelchair tennis, he took part at his first athletics competition the Mobifanten-Cup as part of the competition Heidelberg-Marathon at the age of 10, which he won directly.

2005 he became second at his first junior U18 world championships Stoke Mandeville (United Kingdom) in the 100 m and 200 m. At the 2008 Summer Paralympics in Beijing he reached the semi-final in the 400 m. In the same year he became junior world champion in United States in the 100 m, 200 m und 400 m in the category U20.

In 2009 he won gold at the junior world championship in Nottwil in the 100 m, 200 m, 400 m and 4x100 m relay, this time in the category U23. Additionally since 2009 Marc Schuh owns the German national records in the 100 m, 200 m and 400 m. In November 2009 he took part at the IWAS-World championship in Bangalore and became world champion in the 400 m. Since 2010 he owns the European record in the 400 m with a time of 45,64 s. 2015 he improved this record down to 45,40 s and raced again the second fastest time in history. He is the first and only athlete that could stay under 46 s more than once. In total he stayed three times under 46 s. At the 2012 Summer Paralympics in London Schuh became fifth on the 100 m and sixth on the 400 m. At the world championships 2013 in Lyon he won silver in the 400 m and bronze in the 100 m. 2014 he started at the IPC-European Championship in Swansea in the 100 m, 200 m, 400 m and 800 m. On all four distances he finished on the podium. His best result is a silver medal in the 400 m.

== Literature ==
- Ruppert, Edmund (2009), "Die Paralympics der Behindertensportler: Der Rollstuhlsportler Marc Schuh in Peking", Rheinisch-Bergischer Kalender 2010 (in German), Bergisch Gladbach: Joh. Heider, pp. 232–235, ISBN 978-3-87314-444-6, ISSN 0722-7671
