= Janine Watson =

Australian taekwondo practitioner

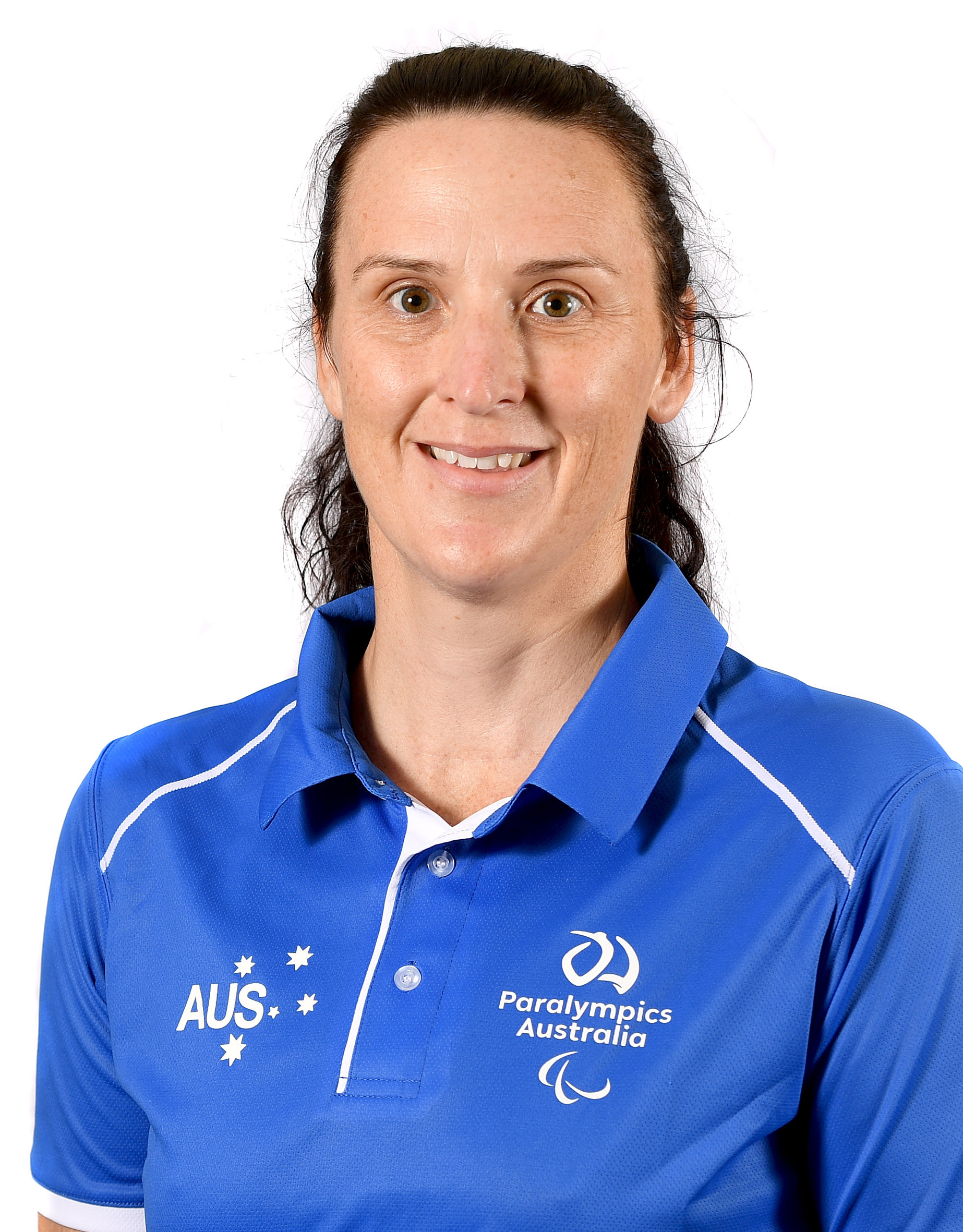
- Watson in 2019

Personal information
- Born: 4 June 1981 (age 45) Queensland, Australia
Medal record
Women's para taekwondo
Representing Australia
Paralympic Games
Bronze medal – third place	2020 Tokyo	+58 kg
World Para Championships
Gold medal – first place	2015 Samsun	P34 Poomsae
Gold medal – first place	2017 London	P34 Poomsae
Gold medal – first place	2019 Antalya	P34 Poomsae
Gold medal – first place	2024 Bahrain	P34 Poomsae

Janine Watson (born 4 June 1981) is Australia's first taekwondo Paralympian. She won one of the bronze medals in the women's +58 kg event at the 2020 Summer Paralympics in Tokyo, Japan. She is also an Australian wheelchair tennis champion.

== Personal ==
Watson was born on 4 June 1981. She grew up in a small rural town in south-western Queensland. At school, she played netball and tennis at state and then national levels. She completed a double degree in Exercise Science and Secondary Education. At the age of 25, she was diagnosed with multiple sclerosis. She works full-time as Head of Department for Maths and Science at one of Brisbane's most prestigious schools.

Her philosophy is "Do what I can, as well as I can, for as long as I can".

== Taekwondo ==
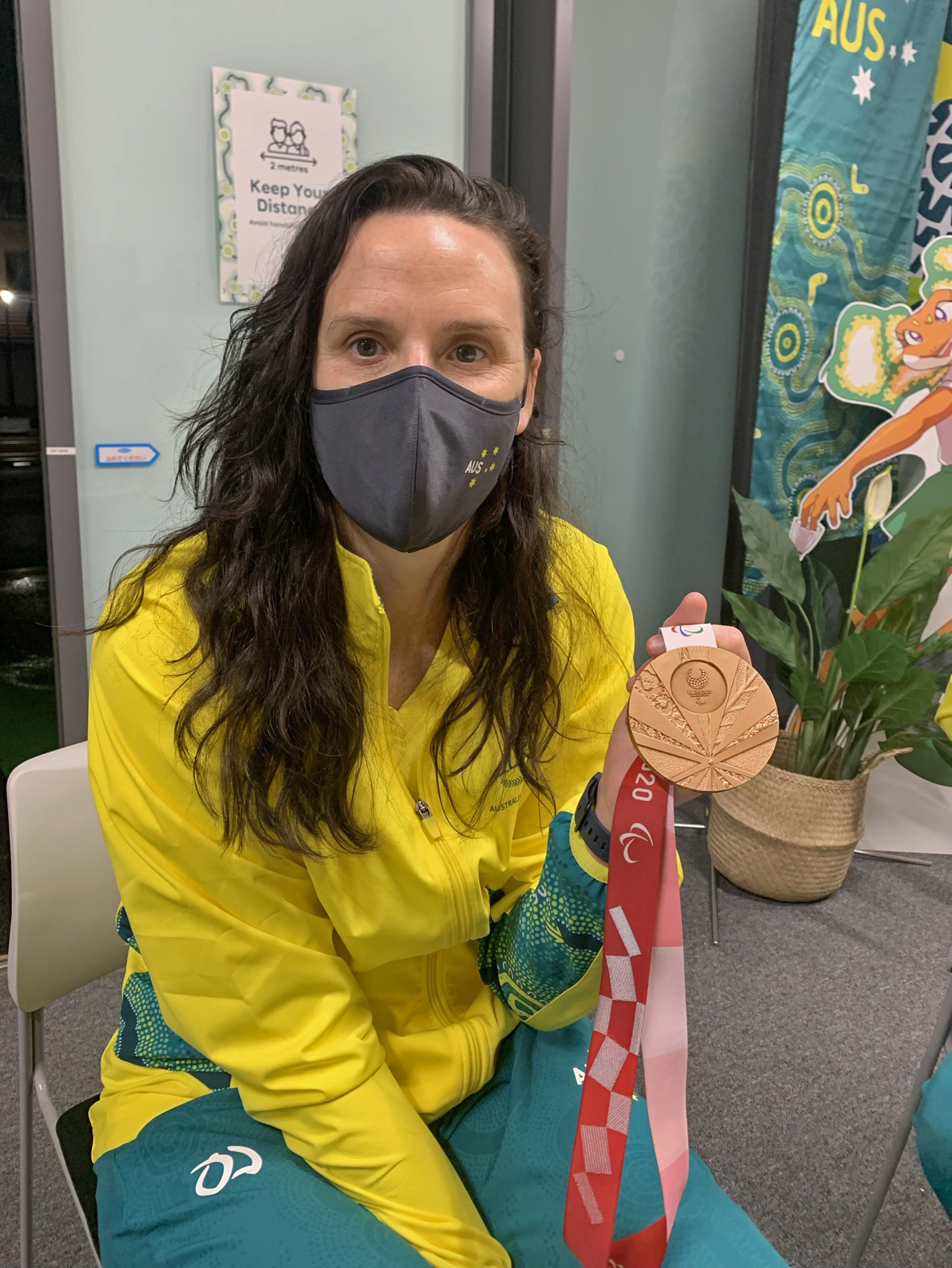
Watson won the bronze medal at the 2020 Tokyo Paralympics

After her multiple sclerosis diagnosis, she took up taekwondo and within nine months she had won her first Australian championships. Her major international results:

- 2014 Commonwealth Championship Scotland – Gold P34 para-poomsae
- 2015 World Para-taekwondo Championships Turkey – Gold P34 para-poomsae
- 2016 Oceania Championships Fiji – Gold P34 para-poomsae
- 2017 Oceania Championships New Zealand – Gold P34 para-poomsae
- 2017 World Para-taekwondo Championships England – Gold P34 para-poomsae
- 2019 World Para-taekwondo Championships Turkey – Gold P34 para-poomsae

In 2018, after a three-year break from kyorugi (sparring), she returned to the discipline, as it was included in the 2020 Tokyo Paralympics program. Watson won Australia's first Paralympic taekwondo medal, claiming bronze in the Women's +58kg.

In 2023 she was presented with the Australian Sports Medal for her achievements in taekwondo.

== Wheelchair tennis ==
She also took up wheelchair tennis after her diagnosis. She has won four consecutive Australian Singles Titles in Wheelchair Tennis in 2016, 2017, 2018 and 2019.
