= Athletics at the 2004 Summer Paralympics – Men's 1500 metres T52–54 =

Men's 100m races for wheelchair athletes at the 2004 Summer Paralympics were held in the Athens Olympic Stadium. Events were held in two disability classes.

== T52 ==
Men's 1,500m T52 at the XII Paralympic Games
- Venue: Athens Olympic Stadium
- Dates: 22–23 September 2004
- Competitors: 13 from 7 nations
- Winning time: 3:49.06

Medalists
1st place, gold medalist(s)		Thomas Geierspichler	Austria
2nd place, silver medalist(s)		Santiago Sanz	Spain
3rd place, bronze medalist(s)		Toshihiro Takada	Japan

The T52 event consisted of 2 heats and a final. It was won by Thomas Geierspichler, representing Austria.

=== 1st Round ===
Qualified for next round

Heat 1

22 Sept. 2004, 09:10

Rank	Athlete	Time	Notes
1	Thomas Geierspichler (AUT)	3:59.60	Q
2	Toshihiro Takada (JPN)	4:03.73	Q
3	Richard Reelie (CAN)	4:03.98	Q
4	Lachlan Jones (AUS)	4:08.80	q
5	Herbert Burns (USA)	4:34.16	
6	Ian Rice (USA)	4:35.87	
7	Ramon Pla (ESP)	4:40.48	

Heat 2

22 Sept. 2004, 09:22

Rank	Athlete	Time	Notes
1	Santiago Sanz (ESP)	3:53.73	PR Q
2	Dean Bergeron (CAN)	3:54.76	Q
3	Tomoya Ito (JPN)	4:04.88	Q
4	Per Vesterlund (SWE)	4:05.49	q
5	Clayton Gerein (CAN)	4:08.07	q
6	Theodore Bridis (USA)	4:08.47	q

=== Final Round ===
23 Sept. 2004, 19:50

Rank	Athlete	Time	Notes
1st place, gold medalist(s)	Thomas Geierspichler (AUT)	3:49.06	PR
2nd place, silver medalist(s)	Santiago Sanz (ESP)	3:49.25	
3rd place, bronze medalist(s)	Toshihiro Takada (JPN)	3:49.76	
4	Clayton Gerein (CAN)	3:58.88	
5	Lachlan Jones (AUS)	3:59.15	
6	Per Vesterlund (SWE)	4:04.32	
7	Richard Reelie (CAN)	4:07.64	
8	Theodore Bridis (USA)	4:21.23	
	Dean Bergeron (CAN)	DNF	
	Tomoya Ito (JPN)	DNF	

== T54 ==
Men's 1,500m T54 at the XII Paralympic Games
- Venue: Athens Olympic Stadium
- Dates: 19–21 September 2004
- Competitors: 29 from 12 nations
- Winning time: 3:04.88

Medalists
1st place, gold medalist(s)		Saúl Mendoza	Mexico
2nd place, silver medalist(s)		Ernst van Dyk	South Africa
3rd place, bronze medalist(s)		Marcel Hug	Switzerland

The T54 event consisted of 3 heats, 2 semifinals and a final. It was won by Saúl Mendoza, representing Mexico.

=== 1st Round ===
Qualified for next round

Heat 1

19 Sept. 2004, 18:15

Rank	Athlete	Time	Notes
1	Ernst van Dyk (RSA)	3:04.50	Q
2	Kurt Fearnley (AUS)	3:04.77	Q
3	Kelly Smith (CAN)	3:05.22	Q
4	Ralph Brunner (GER)	3:05.46	Q
5	Aaron Gordian (MEX)	3:05.47	Q
6	Franz Nietlispach (SUI)	3:05.58	q
7	Nobukazu Hanaoka (JPN)	3:05.80	q
8	Jacob Heilveil (USA)	3:06.25	
9	Eric Teurnier (FRA)	3:09.46	

Heat 2

19 Sept. 2004, 18:24

Rank	Athlete	Time	Notes
1	Joël Jeannot (FRA)	3:00.17	PR Q
2	Choke Yasuoka (JPN)	3:00.43	Q
3	Robert Figl (GER)	3:00.63	Q
4	Saúl Mendoza (MEX)	3:00.64	Q
5	Tomasz Hamerlak (POL)	3:00.81	Q
6	Rawat Tana (THA)	3:01.15	q
7	Scot Hollonbeck (USA)	3:01.45	q
8	Tobias Loetscher (SUI)	3:04.54	q
9	Carl Marquis (CAN)	3:06.26	
10	Paul Nunnari (AUS)	3:06.53	

Heat 3

19 Sept. 2004, 18:33

Rank	Athlete	Time	Notes
1	Jeffrey Adams (CAN)	3:07.99	Q
2	Marcel Hug (SUI)	3:08.08	Q
3	Prawat Wahorum (THA)	3:08.24	Q
4	Jun Hiromichi (JPN)	3:08.32	Q
5	Alhassane Balde (GER)	3:08.33	Q
6	Adam Bleakney (USA)	3:08.60	
7	Martin Velasco Soria (MEX)	3:08.73	
8	Ludovic Gapenne (FRA)	3:09.15	
9	Frederic Periac (AUS)	3:10.62	
10	Marko Sever (SLO)	3:10.89	

=== Semifinals ===
Heat 1

20 Sept. 2004, 19:10

Rank	Athlete	Time	Notes
1	Ernst van Dyk (RSA)	3:07.18	Q
2	Kurt Fearnley (AUS)	3:08.62	Q
3	Aaron Gordian (MEX)	3:08.98	Q
4	Scot Hollonbeck (USA)	3:09.15	
5	Kelly Smith (CAN)	3:09.23	
6	Alhassane Balde (GER)	3:09.30	
7	Choke Yasuoka (JPN)	3:22.32	
	Rawat Tana (THA)	DNF	
	Franz Nietlispach (SUI)	DNF	
	Robert Figl (GER)	DNF	

Heat 2

20 Sept. 2004, 19:25

Rank	Athlete	Time	Notes
1	Saúl Mendoza (MEX)	3:04.52	Q
2	Jeffrey Adams (CAN)	3:04.69	Q
3	Marcel Hug (SUI)	3:04.73	Q
4	Prawat Wahorum (THA)	3:04.85	q
5	Ralph Brunner (GER)	3:05.10	q
6	Joël Jeannot (FRA)	3:05.11	q
7	Tomasz Hamerlak (POL)	3:05.27	q
8	Nobukazu Hanaoka (JPN)	3:05.53	
9	Jun Hiromichi (JPN)	3:08.34	
10	Tobias Loetscher (SUI)	3:08.64	

=== Final Round ===
21 Sept. 2004, 09:05

Rank	Athlete	Time	Notes
1st place, gold medalist(s)	Saúl Mendoza (MEX)	3:04.88	
2nd place, silver medalist(s)	Ernst van Dyk (RSA)	3:05.29	
3rd place, bronze medalist(s)	Marcel Hug (SUI)	3:05.48	
4	Kurt Fearnley (AUS)	3:05.79	
5	Jeffrey Adams (CAN)	3:05.97	
6	Ralph Brunner (GER)	3:06.04	
7	Prawat Wahorum (THA)	3:06.15	
8	Aaron Gordian (MEX)	3:06.17	
9	Joël Jeannot (FRA)	3:06.38	
10	Tomasz Hamerlak (POL)	3:06.40	
