= Athletics at the 2016 Summer Paralympics – Men's marathon =

The Men's marathon athletics events for the 2016 Summer Paralympics took place in the streets of Rio de Janeiro on the 18 September. A total of three events were contested over this distance for three different disability classifications.

== Medal summary ==
Classification	Gold		Silver		Bronze	
T12	El Amin Chentouf; Morocco	2:32:17	Alberto Suarez Laso; Spain	2:33:11	Masahiro Okamura; Japan	2:33.59
T46	Li Chaoyan; China	2:33.35	Abderrahman Ait Khamouch; Spain	2:37.01	Manuel Mendes; Portugal	2:49.57
T54	Marcel Hug; Switzerland	1:26.16	Kurt Fearnley; Australia	1:26.17	Kim Gyu-dae; South Korea	1:30.08

== Results ==
=== T12 ===
The T12 men's marathon was open to both T12 and T11 competitors, which are classifications for visually impaired athletes.

Rank	Name	Nationality	classification	Time	Notes
1st place, gold medalist(s)	El Amin Chentouf	Morocco	T12	2:32:17	SB
2nd place, silver medalist(s)	Alberto Suarez Laso	Spain	T12	2:33:11	SB
3rd place, bronze medalist(s)	Masahiro Okamura	Japan	T12	2:33.59	
4	Tadashi Horikoshi	Japan	T12	2:36.50	SB
5	Shinya Wada	Japan	T11	2:39.52	
6	Gabriel Macchi	Portugal	T12	2:43.49	SB
7	Jorge Pina	Portugal	T12	2:55.47	
8	Sandi Novak	Slovenia	T11	3:02.36	
-	Gustavo Nieves	Spain	T12	Did not finish	
-	Elkin Alonso Serna Moreno	Colombia	T12	Did not finish	
-	Gad Yarkoni	Israel	T11	Disqualified	

=== T46 ===
The T46 men's marathon was open to T46 competitors only.

Rank	Name	Nationality	classification	Time	Notes
1st place, gold medalist(s)	Li Chaoyan	China	T46	2:33.35	RR
2nd place, silver medalist(s)	Abderrahman Ait Khamouch	Spain	T46	2:37:01	SB
3rd place, bronze medalist(s)	Manuel Mendes	Portugal	T46	2:49.57	
4	Efraín Sotacuro	Peru	T46	2:55.27	
5	Mario Bauer	Austria	T46	2:58.34	
6	Christoph Sommer	Switzerland	T46	3:07.11	SB
-	Alex Douglas Silva	Brazil	T46	Did not finish	
-	Derek Rae	Great Britain	T46	Did not finish	
-	Pedro Meza Zempoaltecatl	Mexico	T46	Did not finish	
-	Abdelhadi El Harti	Morocco	T46	Did not finish	
-	Alessandro di Lello	Italy	T46	Did not start	

=== T54 ===
The T54 men's marathon was open to both T54 and T53 competitors only.

Rank	Name	Nationality	classification	Time	Notes
1st place, gold medalist(s)	Marcel Hug	Switzerland	T54	1:26.16	
2nd place, silver medalist(s)	Kurt Fearnley	Australia	T54	1:26.17	
3rd place, bronze medalist(s)	Kim Gyu-dae	South Korea	T54	1:30.08	SB
4	Liu Chengming	China	T54	1:30.09	PB
5	Prawat Wahoram	Thailand	T54	1:30.09	
6	Ernst van Dyk	South Africa	T54	1:30.11	
7	Kota Hokinoue	Japan	T54	1:30.11	
8	Jorge Madera	Spain	T54	1:30.12	SB
9	Pierre Fairbank	France	T53	1:30.12	PB
10	Aaron Pike	United States	T54	1:30.13	
11	Masazumi Soejima	Japan	T54	1:30.13	
12	Hiroyuki Yamamoto	Japan	T54	1:30.14	
13	Rawat Tana	Thailand	T54	1:30.17	
14	Simon Lawson	Great Britain	T53	1:32.15	
15	Jose Jimenez Hernandez	Costa Rica	T53	1:35.58	SB
16	Patrick Monahan	Ireland	T53	1:40.26	
17	Heinz Frei	Switzerland	T53	1:40.29	
18	Kozo Kubo	Japan	T54	1:46.31	
-	Tobais Loetscher	Switzerland	T54	Did not finish	
-	Joshua George	United States	T53	Did not finish	
-	David Weir	Great Britain	T54	Did not finish	
-	James Senbeta	United States	T54	Did not finish	
-	Julien Casoli	France	T54	Did not finish	
-	Hong Suk Man	South Korea	T54	Did not start	
