= Athletics at the 2016 Summer Paralympics – Men's 5000 metres T54 =

Men's 5000 metres T54 at the XV Paralympic Games
- Venue: Estádio Olímpico João Havelange
- Dates: 11 September 2016
- Competitors: 19 from 12 nations

Medalists
| 1st place, gold medalist(s) | | Prawat Wahoram | Thailand |
| 2nd place, silver medalist(s) | | Marcel Hug | Switzerland |
| 3rd place, bronze medalist(s) | | Kurt Fearnley | Australia |

The T54 category is for wheelchair athletes with no leg function, but near full arm function and reasonable to normal trunk function. Typically this may be caused by a lower spinal cord injury or spinal cord birth defect.

The Athletics at the 2016 Summer Paralympics – Men's 5000 metres T54 event at the 2016 Paralympic Games took place on 11 September 2016, at the Estádio Olímpico João Havelange.

== Heats ==
=== Heat 1 ===
18:04 9 September 2016:

| Rank | Lane | Bib | Name | Nationality | Reaction | Time | Notes |
|---|---|---|---|---|---|---|---|
| 1 | 4 | 2179 | Marcel Hug | Switzerland | | 10:20.17 | Q |
| 2 | 1 | 2236 | Prawat Wahoram | Thailand | | 10:20.34 | Q |
| 3 | 2 | 2352 | Joshua George | United States | | 10:20.36 | Q |
| 4 | 7 | 1731 | Masayuki Higuchi | Japan | | 10:20.47 | q |
| 5 | 9 | 2235 | Khajonsak Thamsopon | Thailand | | 10:21.40 | q |
| 6 | 3 | 1536 | Alhassane Balde | Germany | | 10:21.67 | q |
| 7 | 8 | 1203 | Josh Cassidy | Canada | | 10:27.94 | q |
| 8 | 6 | 1779 | Gyu Dae Kim | South Korea | | 10:37.92 | |
| 9 | 5 | 1378 | Ebbe Blichfeldt | Denmark | | 11:42.20 | |

=== Heat 2 ===
18:19 9 September 2016:

| Rank | Lane | Bib | Name | Nationality | Reaction | Time | Notes |
|---|---|---|---|---|---|---|---|
| 1 | 9 | 1051 | Kurt Fearnley | Australia | | 10:36.53 | Q |
| 2 | 10 | 2234 | Rawat Tana | Thailand | | 10:36.61 | Q |
| 3 | 5 | 1777 | Suk Man Hong | South Korea | | 10:37.09 | Q |
| 4 | 2 | 1254 | Yang Liu | China | | 10:38.46 | |
| 5 | 7 | 1471 | Julien Casoli | France | | 10:39.38 | |
| 6 | 1 | 1734 | Kozo Kubo | Japan | | 10:40.37 | |
| 7 | 6 | 2372 | Daniel Romanchuk | United States | | 10:40.40 | |
| 8 | 4 | 2180 | Tobias Loetscher | Switzerland | | 10:40.88 | |
| 9 | 3 | 2373 | James Senbeta | United States | | 10:41.65 | |
| 10 | 8 | 1421 | Jorge Madera | Spain | | 10:42.62 | |

== Final ==
10:15 11 September 2016:

| Rank | Lane | Bib | Name | Nationality | Reaction | Time | Notes |
|---|---|---|---|---|---|---|---|
| 1st place, gold medalist(s) | 3 | 2236 | Prawat Wahoram | Thailand | | 11:01.71 | |
| 2nd place, silver medalist(s) | 6 | 2179 | Marcel Hug | Switzerland | | 11:02.04 | |
| 3rd place, bronze medalist(s) | 8 | 1051 | Kurt Fearnley | Australia | | 11:02.37 | |
| 4 | 10 | 1731 | Masayuki Higuchi | Japan | | 11:02.54 | |
| 5 | 1 | 2352 | Joshua George | United States | | 11:02.64 | |
| 6 | 7 | 2234 | Rawat Tana | Thailand | | 11:02.72 | |
| 7 | 5 | 2235 | Khajonsak Thamsopon | Thailand | | 11:02.80 | |
| 8 | 4 | 1536 | Alhassane Balde | Germany | | 11:03.00 | |
| 9 | 2 | 1777 | Suk Man Hong | South Korea | | 11:03.78 | |
| 10 | 9 | 1203 | Josh Cassidy | Canada | | 11:09.42 | |
