= Athletics at the 2016 Summer Paralympics – Men's 1500 metres T54 =

Men's 1500 metres T54 at the XV Paralympic Games
- Venue: Estádio Olímpico João Havelange
- Dates: 12–13 September 2016
- Competitors: 24 from 15 nations

Medalists
1st place, gold medalist(s)		Prawat Wahoram	Thailand
2nd place, silver medalist(s)		Marcel Hug	Switzerland
3rd place, bronze medalist(s)		Saichon Konjen	Thailand

The T54 category is for wheelchair athletes with no leg function, but near full arm function and reasonable to normal trunk function. Typically this may be caused by a lower spinal cord injury or spinal cord birth defect.

The Athletics at the 2016 Summer Paralympics – Men's 1500 metres T54 event at the 2016 Paralympic Games took place on 12–13 September 2016, at the Estádio Olímpico João Havelange.

== Heats ==
=== Heat 1 ===
18:48 12 September 2016:

Rank	Lane	Bib	Name	Nationality	Reaction	Time	Notes
1	7	2236	Prawat Wahoram	Thailand		3:06.54	Q
2	4	1731	Masayuki Higuchi	Japan		3:06.76	Q
3	3	1536	Alhassane Balde	Germany		3:07.14	Q
4	2	1930	Kenny van Weeghel	Netherlands		3:09.00	
5	8	2275	Yassine Gharbi	Tunisia		3:09.79	
6	5	2365	Aaron Pike	United States		3:09.85	
7	6	1207	Alexandre Dupont	Canada		3:10.28	
8	1	1378	Ebbe Blichfeldt	Denmark		3:13.08	

=== Heat 2 ===
18:56 12 September 2016:

Rank	Lane	Bib	Name	Nationality	Reaction	Time	Notes
1	7	2234	Rawat Tana	Thailand		3:06.24	Q
2	5	1523	David Weir	Great Britain		3:06.28	Q
3	2	1777	Suk Man Hong	South Korea		3:06.36	Q
4	8	1056	Jake Lappin	Australia		3:06.73	
5	4	2372	Daniel Romanchuk	United States		3:07.93	
6	6	1471	Julien Casoli	France		3:08.78	
7	3	2180	Tobias Loetscher	Switzerland		3:09.37	
8	1	1213	Tristan Smyth	Canada		3:11.35	

=== Heat 3 ===
19:04 12 September 2016:

Rank	Lane	Bib	Name	Nationality	Reaction	Time	Notes
1	8	2229	Saichon Konjen	Thailand		3:05.22	Q
2	6	2179	Marcel Hug	Switzerland		3:05.24	Q
3	3	1251	Chengming Liu	China		3:05.41	Q
4	7	1051	Kurt Fearnley	Australia		3:05.47	q
5	5	1779	Gyu-dae Kim	South Korea		3:05.86	
6	4	1203	Josh Cassidy	Canada		3:05.97	
7	1	2352	Joshua George	United States		3:06.43	
8	2	2298	Rashed Aldhaheri	United Arab Emirates		3:07.55	

== Final ==
18:22 13 September 2016:

Rank	Lane	Bib	Name	Nationality	Reaction	Time	Notes
1st place, gold medalist(s)	5	2236	Prawat Wahoram	Thailand		3:00.62	
2nd place, silver medalist(s)	2	2179	Marcel Hug	Switzerland		3:00.65	
3rd place, bronze medalist(s)	8	2229	Saichon Konjen	Thailand		3:00.86	
4	7	1523	David Weir	Great Britain		3:01.08	
5	9	1051	Kurt Fearnley	Australia		3:01.35	
6	4	1536	Alhassane Balde	Germany		3:01.62	
7	1	1251	Chengming Liu	China		3:01.84	
8	6	1731	Masayuki Higuchi	Japan		3:02.05	
9	3	1777	Suk Man Hong	South Korea		3:02.21	
	10	2234	Rawat Tana	Thailand			DSQ
