= Athletics at the 2016 Summer Paralympics – Men's 800 metres T54 =

Men's 800 metres T54 at the XV Paralympic Games
- Venue: Estádio Olímpico João Havelange
- Dates: 14–15 September 2016
- Competitors: 23 from 14 nations

Medalists
1st place, gold medalist(s)		Marcel Hug	Switzerland
2nd place, silver medalist(s)		Saichon Konjen	Thailand
3rd place, bronze medalist(s)		Gyu-dae Kim	South Korea

The T54 category is for wheelchair athletes with no leg function, but near full arm function and reasonable to normal trunk function. Typically this may be caused by a lower spinal cord injury or spinal cord birth defect.

The Athletics at the 2016 Summer Paralympics – Men's 800 metres T54 event at the 2016 Paralympic Games took place on 14–15 September 2016, at the Estádio Olímpico João Havelange.

== Heats ==
=== Heat 1 ===
19:15 14 September 2016:

Rank	Lane	Bib	Name	Nationality	Reaction	Time	Notes
1	2	1523	David Weir	Great Britain		1:37.30	Q
2	8	1240	Yanfeng Cui	China		1:37.84	Q
3	6	1471	Julien Casoli	France		1:37.94	
4	4	1777	Suk Man Hong	South Korea		1:37.97	
5	7	2236	Prawat Wahoram	Thailand		1:38.25	
6	5	2372	Daniel Romanchuk	United States		1:39.29	
7	3	2298	Rashed Aldhaheri	United Arab Emirates		1:39.62	
	1	1056	Jake Lappin	Australia			DSQ

=== Heat 2 ===
19:15 14 September 2016:

Rank	Lane	Bib	Name	Nationality	Reaction	Time	Notes
1	3	2179	Marcel Hug	Switzerland		1:35.96	Q
2	1	1930	Kenny van Weeghel	Netherlands		1:36.18	Q
3	2	1779	Gyu-dae Kim	South Korea		1:36.29	q
4	7	1254	Yang Liu	China		1:36.51	q
5	5	1536	Alhassane Balde	Germany		1:37.30	
6	4	2234	Rawat Tana	Thailand		1:37.34	
7	8	2282	Fethi Zouinkhi	Tunisia		1:37.96	
8	6	1203	Josh Cassidy	Canada		1:39.86	

=== Heat 3 ===
19:15 14 September 2016:

Rank	Lane	Bib	Name	Nationality	Reaction	Time	Notes
1	7	2229	Saichon Konjen	Thailand		1:38.43	Q
2	5	2275	Yassine Gharbi	Tunisia		1:38.52	Q
3	6	1251	Chengming Liu	China		1:38.54	
4	4	1731	Masayuki Higuchi	Japan		1:38.77	
5	2	1502	Richard Chiassaro	Great Britain		1:39.33	
6	8	1207	Alexandre Dupont	Canada		1:40.37	
7	3	2373	James Senbeta	United States		1:42.47	

== Final ==
12:02 15 September 2016:

Rank	Lane	Bib	Name	Nationality	Reaction	Time	Notes
1st place, gold medalist(s)	4	2179	Marcel Hug	Switzerland		1:33.76	
2nd place, silver medalist(s)	1	2229	Saichon Konjen	Thailand		1:34.74	
3rd place, bronze medalist(s)	5	1779	Gyu-dae Kim	South Korea		1:34.98	
4	2	1240	Yanfeng Cui	China		1:35.03	
5	8	1254	Yang Liu	China		1:35.18	
6	6	1523	David Weir	Great Britain		1:35.20	
7	3	1930	Kenny van Weeghel	Netherlands		1:36.01	
	7	2275	Yassine Gharbi	Tunisia			DSQ
