= Athletics at the 2004 Summer Paralympics – Men's 10000 metres T54 =

Men's 10,000m T54 at the XII Paralympic Games
- Venue: Athens Olympic Stadium
- Dates: 19–21 September 2004
- Competitors: 25 from 13 nations
- Winning time: 20:51.86

Medalists
1st place, gold medalist(s)		Joël Jeannot	France
2nd place, silver medalist(s)		Prawat Wahorum	Thailand
3rd place, bronze medalist(s)		Rawat Tana	Thailand

The Men's 10000m race for class T54 wheelchair athletes at the 2004 Summer Paralympics were held in the Athens Olympic Stadium on 19 & 21 September. The event consisted of 2 heats and a final, and was won by Joël Jeannot, representing France.

== 1st round ==
Qualified for next round

Heat 1

19 Sept. 2004, 22:00

Rank	Athlete	Time	Notes
1	Rawat Tana (THA)	21:08.77	Q
2	Jacob Heilveil (USA)	21:08.94	Q
3	Krige Schabort (RSA)	21:08.97	Q
4	Tomasz Hamerlak (POL)	21:09.02	Q
5	Scot Hollonbeck (USA)	21:09.29	q
6	Alain Fuss (FRA)	21:09.64	q
7	Heinz Frei (SUI)	21:10.07	q
8	Michel Filteau (CAN)	21:10.13	q
9	Martin Velasco Soria (MEX)	21:10.88	
10	Hiroki Sasahara (JPN)	21:11.38	
11	Masazumi Soejima (JPN)	21:12.33	
12	Mohamed Farhat Belkhir (TUN)	21:12.64	
	Yevgeniy Tetyukhin (KAZ)	DNF	

Heat 2

19 Sept. 2004, 22:30

Rank	Athlete	Time	Notes
1	Joël Jeannot (FRA)	21:47.79	Q
2	Prawat Wahorum (THA)	21:47.93	Q
3	Aaron Gordian (MEX)	21:48.34	Q
4	Franz Nietlispach (SUI)	21:48.46	Q
5	Ralph Brunner (GER)	21:48.58	
6	Jun Hiromichi (JPN)	21:50.31	
7	Denis Lemeunier (FRA)	21:52.04	
8	Alan Bergman (CAN)	22:27.76	
9	Carl Marquis (CAN)	22:54.05	
10	Tyler Byers (USA)	23:05.24	
11	Paul Nunnari (AUS)	23:44.16	
12	Sergey Ussoltsev (KAZ)	24:38.80	

== Final round ==
21 Sept. 2004, 19:05

Rank	Athlete	Time	Notes
1st place, gold medalist(s)	Joël Jeannot (FRA)	20:51.86	PR
2nd place, silver medalist(s)	Prawat Wahorum (THA)	20:52.10	
3rd place, bronze medalist(s)	Rawat Tana (THA)	20:53.38	
4	Tomasz Hamerlak (POL)	20:53.54	
5	Aaron Gordian (MEX)	20:53.59	
6	Alain Fuss (FRA)	20:53.74	
7	Heinz Frei (SUI)	20:53.95	
8	Krige Schabort (RSA)	20:54.56	
9	Franz Nietlispach (SUI)	20:56.02	
10	Jacob Heilveil (USA)	20:59.72	
11	Scot Hollonbeck (USA)	20:59.78	
12	Michel Filteau (CAN)	21:55.14	
