= Athletics at the 2004 Summer Paralympics – Men's 4 × 400 metre relay T53–T54 =

Men's 4x400m T53-54 at the XII Paralympic Games
- Venue: Athens Olympic Stadium
- Dates: 23–24 September 2004
- Competitors: 10
- Winning time: 3:12.73

Medalists
1st place, gold medalist(s)		Prawat Wahorum; Pichet Krungget; Rawat Tana; Supachai Koysub	Thailand
2nd place, silver medalist(s)		Joël Jeannot; Pierre Fairbank; Eric Teurnier; Claude Issorat	France
3rd place, bronze medalist(s)		Choke Yasuoka; Yoshifumi Nagao; Susumu Kangawa; Masazumi Soejima	Japan

The Men's 4x400m relay T53-54 for wheelchair athletes at the 2004 Summer Paralympics were held in the Athens Olympic Stadium on 27 September. The event consisted of 3 heats and a final. It was won by the team representing Thailand.

== 1st round ==
Qualified for next round

Heat 1

23 Sept. 2004, 12:20

Rank	Team	Time	Notes
1	France	3:15.26	Q
2	Mexico	3:18.52	q
3	Germany	3:26.66	

Heat 2

23 Sept. 2004, 12:30

Rank	Team	Time	Notes
1	Japan	3:15.25	Q
2	Australia	3:19.10	
3	Canada	3:23.87	
	China	DSQ	

Heat 3

23 Sept. 2004, 12:40

Rank	Team	Time	Notes
1	Thailand	3:16.56	Q
2	Switzerland	3:19.23	
3	United States	3:20.67	

== Final round ==
24 Sept. 2004, 21:55

Rank	Team	Time	Notes
1st place, gold medalist(s)	Thailand	3:12.73	WR
2nd place, silver medalist(s)	France	3:14.08	
3rd place, bronze medalist(s)	Japan	3:16.57	
4	Mexico	3:18.54	

== Team Lists ==
Japan; Choke Yasuoka; Yoshifumi Nagao; Susumu Kangawa; Masazumi Soejima	France; Joël Jeannot; Pierre Fairbank; Eric Teurnier; Claude Issorat	Thailand; Prawat Wahorum; Pichet Krungget; Rawat Tana; Supachai Koysub	Mexico; Gonzalo Valdovinos; Freddy Sandoval; Jaime Ramirez; Fernando Sanchez
Australia; Richard Colman; Frederic Periac; Richard Nicholson; Kurt Fearnley	Switzerland; Franz Nietlispach; Heinz Frei; Tobias Loetscher; Marcel Hug	United States; Joshua George; Adam Bleakney; Jacob Heilveil; Scot Hollonbeck	Canada; Carl Marquis; Brent Lakatos; Curtis Thom; Eric Gauthier
Germany; Robert Figl; Reinhard Berner; Alhassane Balde; Sebastian Cleem	China; Liu Wei; Zhao Ji; Li Jun; Zhang Li Xin		
