= Thailand at the 2016 Summer Paralympics =

- IPC code: THA
- NPC: Paralympic Committee of Thailand
- Website: www.paralympicthai.com (in Thai and English)

in Rio de Janeiro
- Competitors: 45 in 10 sports
- Medals Ranked 23rd: Gold 6 Silver 6 Bronze 6 Total 18

Summer Paralympics appearances (overview)
- 1984; 1988; 1992; 1996; 2000; 2004; 2008; 2012; 2016; 2020; 2024

Thailand competed at the 2016 Summer Paralympics in Rio de Janeiro, Brazil, from 7 September to 18 September 2016.

== Competitors ==
Sport	Men	Women	Total
Archery	2	1	3
Athletics	11	2	13
Boccia	5	2	7
Judo	0	1	1
Powerlifting	1	1	2
Shooting	3	2	5
Swimming	3	1	4
Table Tennis	4	3	7
Wheelchair Fencing	0	1	1
Wheelchair Tennis	1	1	2
Total	30	15	45

== Disability classifications ==
Every participant at the Paralympics has their disability grouped into one of five disability categories; amputation, the condition may be congenital or sustained through injury or illness; cerebral palsy; wheelchair athletes, there is often overlap between this and other categories; visual impairment, including blindness; Les autres, any physical disability that does not fall strictly under one of the other categories, for example dwarfism or multiple sclerosis. Each Paralympic sport then has its own classifications, dependent upon the specific physical demands of competition. Events are given a code, made of numbers and letters, describing the type of event and classification of the athletes competing. Some sports, such as athletics, divide athletes by both the category and severity of their disabilities, other sports, for example swimming, group competitors from different categories together, the only separation being based on the severity of the disability.

== Medalists ==
Medal	Name	Sport	Event	Date
Gold	Prawat Wahoram	Athletics	Men's 5000 m T54	11 September
Gold	Pongsakorn Paeyo	Athletics	Men's 400 m T53	11 September
Gold	Worawut Saengampa; Pattaya Tadtong; Subin Tipmanee; Watcharaphon Vongsa	Boccia	Team BC1–2	12 September
Gold	Prawat Wahoram	Athletics	Men's 1500 m T54	13 September
Gold	Pongsakorn Paeyo	Athletics	Men's 800 m T53	15 September
Gold	Watcharaphon Vongsa	Boccia	Individual BC2	16 September
Silver	Pongsakorn Paeyo	Athletics	Men's 100 m T53	9 September
Silver	Saysunee Jana	Wheelchair fencing	Women's épée B	13 September
Silver	Hanreuchai Netsiri	Archery	Men's individual recurve open	13 September
Silver	Saichon Konjen	Athletics	Men's 800 m T54	15 September
Silver	Worawut Saengampa	Boccia	Individual BC2	16 September
Silver	Saichon Konjen; Rawat Tana; Pongsakorn Paeyo; Prawat Wahoram	Athletics	Men's 4 × 400 m relay	17 September
Bronze	Rungroj Thainiyom	Table tennis	Men's singles – C6	11 September
Bronze	Chaloemphon Tanbut; Pornchok Larpyen; Nuanchan Phonsila	Boccia	Pairs BC4	12 September
Bronze	Saichon Konjen	Athletics	Men's 1500 m T54	13 September
Bronze	Pichaya Kurattanasiri	Athletics	Men's 1500 m T52	15 September
Bronze	Pornchok Larpyen	Boccia	Individual BC4	16 September
Bronze	Yuttajak Glinbancheun; Anurak Laowong	Table tennis	Men's Team − C3	16 September

Medals by sport
Sport	1st place, gold medalist(s)	2nd place, silver medalist(s)	3rd place, bronze medalist(s)	Total
Archery	0	1	0	1
Athletics	4	3	2	9
Boccia	2	1	2	5
Table tennis	0	0	2	2
Wheelchair fencing	0	1	0	1
Total	6	6	6	18

Medals by day
Day	Date	1st place, gold medalist(s)	2nd place, silver medalist(s)	3rd place, bronze medalist(s)	Total
1	8 September	0	0	0	0
2	9 September	0	1	0	1
3	10 September	0	0	0	0
4	11 September	2	0	1	3
5	12 September	1	0	1	2
6	13 September	1	2	1	4
7	14 September	0	0	0	0
8	15 September	1	1	1	3
9	16 September	1	1	2	4
10	17 September	0	1	0	1
11	18 September	0	0	0	0
	Total	6	6	6	18

== Archery ==
Thailand qualified one archer for the Rio Games following their performance at the 2015 World Archery Para Championships. Wasana Khuthawisap earned the spot after making the round of sixteen in the recurve women's open event.

Individual

Athlete	Event	Ranking round		Round of 32	Round of 16	Quarterfinals	Semifinals	Final / BM	
Athlete	Event	Score	Seed	Opposition Score	Opposition Score	Opposition Score	Opposition Score	Opposition Score	Rank
Methasin Chailinfa	Men's individual compound open	646	25	Stubbs (GBR); L 135−139	Did not advance				
Hanreuchai Netsiri	Men's individual recurve open	633	2	Savas (TUR); W 6−2	Erario (ITA); W 7−1	Bennett (USA); W 6−0	Rezende (BRA); W 6−0	Rahimi (IRI); L 2−5	2nd place, silver medalist(s)
Wasana Khuthawisap	Women's individual recurve open	584	13	Dergovics (BRA); W 6−4	Olszewska (POL); L 0−6	Did not advance			

Team

Athlete	Event	Ranking round		Round of 16	Quarterfinals	Semifinals	Final / BM	
Athlete	Event	Score	Seed	Opposition Score	Opposition Score	Opposition Score	Opposition Score	Rank
Hanreuchai Netsiri; Wasana Khuthawisap	Mixed team recurve open	1217	7	Savas / Eroglu (TUR); W 5−3	Zhao L / Wu Ch (CHN); L 0−6	Did not advance		

== Athletics ==
Men
Track

Athlete	Events	Heat		Semifinal		Final	
Athlete	Events	Time	Rank	Time	Rank	Time	Rank
Suphachai Songphinit; Guide : Wanchai Khaodee	400 m T11	53.91	3	—N/a		Did not advance	
Pichaya Kurattanasiri	100 m T52	19.18	5	—N/a		Did not advance	
Pichaya Kurattanasiri	400 m T52	1:03.03	4 q	—N/a		1:03.27	5
Pichaya Kurattanasiri	1500 m T52	—N/a				3:53.96	3rd place, bronze medalist(s)
Pichet Krungget	100 m T53	15.83	5	—N/a		Did not advance	
Pichet Krungget	400 m T53	DNS		—N/a		Did not advance	
Pichet Krungget	800 m T53	DNS		—N/a		Did not advance	
Pongsakorn Paeyo	100 m T53	14.56 PR	1 Q	—N/a		14.80	2nd place, silver medalist(s)
Pongsakorn Paeyo	400 m T53	48.38	1 Q	—N/a		47.91	1st place, gold medalist(s)
Pongsakorn Paeyo	800 m T53	1:37.45	1 Q	—N/a		1:40.78	1st place, gold medalist(s)
Ekkachai Janthon	100 m T54	15.29	5	—N/a		Did not advance	
Ekkachai Janthon	400 m T54	51.15	6	—N/a		Did not advance	
Saichon Konjen	100 m T54	14.44	3 q	—N/a		14.28	4
Saichon Konjen	400 m T54	47.01	4 q	—N/a		47.66	7
Saichon Konjen	800 m T54	1:38.43	1 Q	—N/a		1:34.74	2nd place, silver medalist(s)
Saichon Konjen	1500 m T54	3:05.22	1 Q	—N/a		3:00.86	3rd place, bronze medalist(s)
Prawat Wahoram	800 m T54	1:38.25	5	—N/a		Did not advance	
Prawat Wahoram	1500 m T54	3:06.54	1 Q	—N/a		3:00.62	1st place, gold medalist(s)
Prawat Wahoram	5000 m T54	10:20.34	2 Q	—N/a		11:01.71	1st place, gold medalist(s)
Prawat Wahoram	Marathon T54	—N/a				1:30:09	5
Rawat Tana	800 m T54	1:37.34	6	—N/a		Did not advance	
Rawat Tana	1500 m T54	3:06.24	1 Q	—N/a		DNF	
Rawat Tana	5000 m T54	10:36.61	2 Q	—N/a		11:02.72	6
Rawat Tana	Marathon T54	—N/a				1:30:17	13
Khajonsak Thamsopon	5000 m T54	10:21.40	5 q	—N/a		11:02.80	7
Saichon Konjen; Rawat Tana; Pongsakorn Paeyo; Prawat Wahoram	4 × 400 m relay	3:08.37	1 Q	—N/a		3:07.73	2nd place, silver medalist(s)

Field

Athlete	Events	Result	Rank
Angkarn Chanaboon	High jump T45−47	1.96	4
Sakchai Yimbanchang	Javelin throw F56−57	42.00	6

Women
Track

Athlete	Events	Heat		Semifinal		Final	
Athlete	Events	Time	Rank	Time	Rank	Time	Rank
Kewalin Wannaruemon; Guide : Panyaguide Makumjai	200 m T11	26.73	2 q	26.81	4	Did not advance	

Field

Athlete	Events	Result	Rank
Surang Khamsuk	Javelin throw F45−46	28.46	7

== Boccia ==
Thailand qualified for the 2016 Summer Paralympics in this sport at the Hong Kong hosted 2015 BISFed Asia and Oceania Boccia Team and Pairs Championships in the BC1/BC2 Team event. They claimed gold ahead of silver medalist South Korea and bronze medalists Japan. They were the only team in round robin play that won every game, with China, Japan and South Korea all winning 3 games and losing 2 games. Their placing was based point difference. The team included Pattaya Tadtong, Witsanu Huadpradit, Watcharaphon Vongsa, and Worawut Saengampa. They entered the qualifying event as the top seeded team in Asia, ranked third in the world. China was the next highest ranked at ninth in the world, and were the second seed in this category.

Individual

Athlete	Event	Pool matches				Quarterfinals	Semifinals	Final / BM	
Athlete	Event	Opposition Score	Opposition Score	Opposition Score	Rank	Opposition Score	Opposition Score	Opposition Score	Rank
Pattaya Tadtong	Individual BC1	Fujii (JPN); W 18−0	Sun K (CHN); W 6−2	Chagas (BRA); W 8−1	1 Q	Smith (GBR); L 4−4*	Did not advance		
Watcharaphon Vongsa	Individual BC2	M Perez (ESP); W 12−2	Murray (GBR); W 8−1	—N/a	1 Q	Hirose (JPN); W 6−1	Yan Zh (CHN); W 6−1	Saengampa (THA); W 5−4	1st place, gold medalist(s)
Worawut Saengampa	Individual BC2	Rowe (GBR); W 10−0	Goncalves (POR); W 7−4	—N/a	1 Q	Valente (POR); W 12−1	Jeong S-y (KOR); W 10−1	Vongsa (THA); L 4−5	2nd place, silver medalist(s)
Pornchok Larpyen	Individual BC4	Andrejcik (SVK); W 3−1	Steer (GBR); W 5−0	D Santos (BRA); W 5−2	1 Q	Levine (CAN); W 3−2	Yuk W L (HKG); L 7−4	Hyeonseok (KOR); W 8−1	3rd place, bronze medalist(s)

Pairs and teams

Athlete	Event	Pool matches				Quarterfinals	Semifinals	Final / BM	
Athlete	Event	Opposition Score	Opposition Score	Opposition Score	Rank	Opposition Score	Opposition Score	Opposition Score	Rank
Pattaya Tadtong; Watcharaphon Vongsa; Worawut Saengampa; Subin Tipmanee	Team BC1–2	Lee D-w / Yoo W-j / Sohn J-m / Jeong S-y (KOR); W 16−1	Zhang Qi / Yan Zh / Zhong K / Sun K (CHN); W 11−4	—N/a	1 Q	Murray / Rowe / Smith / Taggart (GBR); W 11−0	Ibarbure / Gonzalez / Sahonero / Cristaldo (ARG); W 14−1	Kitani / Hirose / Fujii / Sugimura (JPN); W 9−4	1st place, gold medalist(s)
Chaloemphon Tanbut; Pornchok Larpyen; Nuanchan Phonsila	Pairs BC4	Zheng Y / Lin X (CHN); W 6−2	Pinto / E D Santos / M D Santos (BRA); W 4−2	Ciobanu / Dispaltro / Levine (CAN); W 7−3	1 Q	—N/a	Andrejcik / Balcova / Durkovic (SVK); L 6−1	Edwards / McGuire / Steer (GBR); W 3−2	3rd place, bronze medalist(s)

== Judo ==
Athlete	Event	Preliminaries	Quarterfinals	Semifinals	Repechage First round	Repechage Final	Final / BM	
Athlete	Event	Opposition Result	Opposition Result	Opposition Result	Opposition Result	Opposition Result	Opposition Result	Rank
Methawadee Nanthalak	Women's +70 kg	—N/a	Alimova (UZB); L 000–100	Bye	—N/a	Garcia (USA); L 000–102	Did not advance	

== Powerlifting ==
Athlete	Event	Total lifted	Rank
Narong Kasanun	Men's 59 kg	165	4
Arawan Bootpo	Women's 73 kg	105	4

== Shooting ==
The third opportunity for direct qualification for shooters to the Rio Paralympics took place at the 2015 IPC Shooting World Cup in Sydney, Australia. At this competition, Somporn Muangsiri earned a qualifying spot for their country in the P2- Women's 10m Air Pistol SH1 event. Bordin Sornsriwichai earned a second spot for Thailand in the P4 – Mixed 50m Pistol SH1 event. As no woman met the qualifying criteria in the R6- Mixed 50m Rifle Prone SH1 event, the spot was re-allocated to R3 – Mixed 10m Air Rifle Prone SH1. Chutima Saenlar claimed this spot for Thailand. Atidet Intanon claimed the country's third spot at this competition based on their performance in the R7- Men's 50m Rifle 3 Positions event.

Athlete	Event	Qualification		Final	
Athlete	Event	Score	Rank	Score	Rank
Bordin Sornsriwichai	Men's 10 m air pistol SH1	559.0	10	Did not advance	
Bordin Sornsriwichai	Mixed 50 m pistol SH1	502.0	28	Did not advance	
Atidet Intanon	Men's 10 m air rifle standing SH1	597.0	20	Did not advance	
Atidet Intanon	Men's 50 m rifle 3 positions SH1	1132.0	15	Did not advance	
Atidet Intanon	Mixed 10 m air rifle prone SH1	628.2	23	Did not advance	
Atidet Intanon	Mixed 50 m rifle prone SH1	610.8	17	Did not advance	
Chatchai Senachan	Mixed 10 m air rifle standing SH2	624.0	20	Did not advance	
Chatchai Senachan	Mixed 10 m air rifle prone SH2	631.9	15	Did not advance	
Somporn Muangsiri	Women's 10 m air pistol SH1	356.0	17	Did not advance	
Chutima Saenlar	Women's 10 m air rifle standing SH1	402.0	10	Did not advance	
Chutima Saenlar	Women's 50 m rifle 3 positions SH1	551.0	11	Did not advance	
Chutima Saenlar	Mixed 10 m air rifle prone SH1	630.0	16	Did not advance	

== Swimming ==
Men

Athlete	Events	Heats		Final	
Athlete	Events	Time	Rank	Time	Rank
Somchai Doungkaew	50 m breaststroke SB2	56.69	5 Q	56.52	5
Somchai Doungkaew	50 m backstroke S4	55.21	10	Did not advance	
Somchai Doungkaew	150 m Individual Medley SM3	3:02.73	5 Q	3:06.25	5
Charkorn Kaewsri	50 m breaststroke SB2	1:12.34	9	Did not advance	
Charkorn Kaewsri	150 m Individual Medley SM3	3:54.96	9	Did not advance	
Panom Lagsanaprim	100 m breaststroke SB11	1:27.90	9	Did not advance	

Women

Athlete	Events	Heats		Final	
Athlete	Events	Time	Rank	Time	Rank
Anchaya Ketkeaw	50 m freestyle S9	31.01	13	Did not advance	
Anchaya Ketkeaw	100 m freestyle S9	1:08.34	16	Did not advance	
Anchaya Ketkeaw	100 m butterfly S9	1:17.30	18	Did not advance	
Anchaya Ketkeaw	100 m backstroke S9	1:21.66	15	Did not advance	

== Table tennis ==
Men

Athlete	Event	Preliminaries			Round of 16	Quarterfinals	Semifinals	Final / BM	
Athlete	Event	Opposition Result	Opposition Result	Rank	Opposition Result	Opposition Result	Opposition Result	Opposition Result	Rank
Anurak Laowong	Singles C3	Schmidberger (GER); L (4–11, 5–11, 3–11)	Makszin (ROU); W (11–8, 8–11, 11–7, 11–6)	2 Q	Zhai X (CHN); L (8–11, 6–11, 10–12)	Did not advance			
Yuttajak Glinbancheun	Singles C3	Feng P (CHN); L (5–11, 8–11, 5–11)	Kramminger (AUT); W (11–8, 11–6, 11–6)	2 Q	Zhao P (CHN); L (6–11, 7–11, 11–6, 8–11)	Did not advance			
Wanchai Chaiwut	Singles C4	Zhang Y (CHN); L (6–11, 11–8, 11–9, 7–11, 2–11)	Wyndham (SLE); W (11–2, 11–9, 14–9)	2 Q	Guo X (CHN); L (6–11, 4–11, 11–8, 5–11)	Did not advance			
Rungroj Thainiyom	Singles C6	Jensen (DEN); W (11–5, 11–6, 11–4)	Bobrov (ISR); W (11–8, 11–5, 14–12)	1 Q	Bye	Seoane (ESP); W (11–7, 11–9, 4−11, 9−11, 11–7)	Valera (ESP); L (3–11, 9–11, 12−10, 3–11)	Park H-k (KOR); W (11–4, 11–4, 11–4)	3rd place, bronze medalist(s)

Women

Athlete	Event	Preliminaries			Round of 16	Quarterfinals	Semifinals	Final / BM	
Athlete	Event	Opposition Result	Opposition Result	Rank	Opposition Result	Opposition Result	Opposition Result	Opposition Result	Rank
Chilchitparyak Bootwansirina	Singles C1–2	Rossi (ITA); L (11−9, 9–11, 7–11, 6–11)	Brill (ISR); W (11−6, 9–11, 11–8, 11–4)	2 Q	—N/a	Lafaye (FRA); W (11−9, 11–3, 11–13, 11–7)	Liu J (CHN); L (4–11, 7–11, 7–11)	Rossi (ITA); L (10–12, 0–11, 9–11)	4
Dararat Asayut	Singles C3	Xue J (CHN); L (6–11, 4–11, 7–11)	Dretar Karic (CRO); L (9–11, 9–11, 6–11)	3	Did not advance				
Wijittra Jaion	Singles C4	Peric-Rankovic (SRB); W (8–11, 17–15, 2–11, 12–10, 11–7)	Oliveira (BRA); W (9–11, 11–6, 11–2, 9–11, 12–10)	1 Q	—N/a	Matic (SRB); L (11−2, 8–11, 7–11, 7–11)	Did not advance		

Teams

Athlete	Event	Round of 16	Quarterfinals	Semifinals	Final / BM	
Athlete	Event	Opposition Result	Opposition Result	Opposition Result	Opposition Result	Rank
Anurak Laowong; Yuttajak Glinbancheun	Men's team C3	—N/a	Czuper / Nalepka (POL); W (3–1, 2−3, 3−1)	Zhao P / Feng P / Zhai X (CHN); L (1–3, 0−3)	Andrade / Knaf (BRA); W (3–2, 3−0)	3rd place, bronze medalist(s)
Chilchitparyak Bootwansirina; Dararat Asayut	Women's team C1–3	—N/a	Dretar Karic / Muzinic (CRO); L (1–3, 0−3)	Did not advance		

== Wheelchair fencing ==
Athlete	Event	Qualification			Quarterfinal	Semifinal	Final / BM	
Athlete	Event	Opposition	Score	Rank	Opposition Score	Opposition Score	Opposition Score	Rank
Saysunee Jana	Women's individual épée B	Zhou J (CHN)	L 4−5	2 Q	Makowska (POL); W 15−5	Briese-Baetke (GER); W 15−5	Zhou J (CHN); L 10−15	2nd place, silver medalist(s)
Saysunee Jana	Women's individual épée B	Chan Y C (HKG)	W 5−1	2 Q	Makowska (POL); W 15−5	Briese-Baetke (GER); W 15−5	Zhou J (CHN); L 10−15	2nd place, silver medalist(s)
Saysunee Jana	Women's individual épée B	Dani (HUN)	W 5−3	2 Q	Makowska (POL); W 15−5	Briese-Baetke (GER); W 15−5	Zhou J (CHN); L 10−15	2nd place, silver medalist(s)
Saysunee Jana	Women's individual épée B	Makrytskaya (BLR)	W 5−2	2 Q	Makowska (POL); W 15−5	Briese-Baetke (GER); W 15−5	Zhou J (CHN); L 10−15	2nd place, silver medalist(s)
Saysunee Jana	Women's individual épée B	Kastsuichkova (BLR)	L 2−5	2 Q	Makowska (POL); W 15−5	Briese-Baetke (GER); W 15−5	Zhou J (CHN); L 10−15	2nd place, silver medalist(s)

== Wheelchair tennis ==
The first place the country qualified was for one athlete in wheelchair tennis. Sakhorn Khanthasit was named via the standard qualification process, and goes into Rio as the 2014 Para Asian Games women's singles champion. Suthi Khlongrua earned a slot in Rio in the men's singles event via a Bipartite Commission Invitation place

Athlete (seed)	Event	Round of 64	Round of 32	Round of 16	Quarterfinals	Semifinals	Final / BM	
Athlete (seed)	Event	Opposition Score	Opposition Score	Opposition Score	Opposition Score	Opposition Score	Opposition Score	Rank
Suthi Khlongrua	Men's singles	Maripa (RSA); L (5–7, 0–6)	Did not advance					
Sakhorn Khanthasit	Women's singles	—N/a	Van Koot (NED); L (2–6, 3–6)	Did not advance				

== See also ==
- Thailand at the 2016 Summer Olympics
