= Yassine Gharbi =

Tunisian Paralympic athlete

Personal information
- Nationality: Tunisian
- Born: 23 March 1990 (age 36) Rades, Tunisia

Sport
- Sport: Paralympic athletics
- Disability class: T54
- Event: Wheelchair racing
- Coached by: Abdallah Mechraoui

Achievements and titles
- Paralympic finals: 2016
Medal record
Men's para athletics
Representing Tunisia
Paralympic Games
Bronze medal – third place	2016 Rio de Janeiro	400 m T54
World Championships
Gold medal – first place	2017 London	200 m T54
Gold medal – first place	2017 London	400 m T54
Gold medal – first place	2025 New Delhi	400 m T54
Silver medal – second place	2017 London	1500 m T54
Bronze medal – third place	2017 London	800 m T54
Bronze medal – third place	2025 New Delhi	800 m T54
Mediterranean Games
Bronze medal – third place	2013 Mersin	1500 m T54

Yassine Gharbi (born 23 March 1990) is a Paralympic athlete from Tunisia competing in T54 class wheelchair racing. He participated in the 2016 Paralympic Games and is a World Champion in both the 400 and 800 metre races.

He is unable to compete in competitive sports until 4 February 2024 due to a doping suspension.

== Personal history ==
Gharbi was born in Radès, Tunisia in 1990.

== Sporting career ==
Gharbi took up athletics in 2009 with the intent to improve to improve his social integration. He made his senior international debut in 2010 classified as a T54 competitor. Gharbi's first major international competition was the Mediterranean Games held in Mersin, Turkey. He took part in one event, the 1500m (T54), finish third with a time of 3.26:81. Two years later he represented Tunisia on the world stage after he qualified for the 2015 IPC Athletics World Championships in Doha. He competed in four events, failing to complete the 1500m and 5000m races, but finishing the 800m in seventh and the 400m in fourth, just outside the medals. In October of that year Gharbi entered the 2015 African Games in Doha. There he won gold in two events, the 800m (T54) and 1500m (T53/54).

In 2016 Gharbi was selected to represent Tunisia at his first Summer Paralympics, held in Rio de Janeiro. In his first race, the 400 m (T54), he posted a time of 47.07 to claim the bronze medal, his first major international podium finish. Gharbi failed to get through to the final for the 1500m and in the 800m, despite initially finishing second behind Switzerland's Marcel Hug, he was later disqualified and did not medal.

The following year at the 2017 World Para Athletics Championships in London, Gharbi announced his arrival as a major competitor in his class by winning medals in all four of his events. He won bronze in the 800m, silver in the 1500m and set two new championship records to claim gold in both the 200m and 400m races.
