= Athletics at the 2016 Summer Paralympics – Men's 400 metres T54 =

Competitive event in the 2016 Summer Paralympic games

Men's 400 metres T54 at the XV Paralympic Games
- Venue: Rio Olympic Stadium
- Dates: 11–12 September
- Competitors: 20

Medalists
1st place, gold medalist(s)		Kenny van Weeghel	Netherlands
2nd place, silver medalist(s)		Liu Yang	China
3rd place, bronze medalist(s)		Yassine Gharbi	Tunisia

The Men's 400 metres T54 event at the 2016 Summer Paralympics took place at the Estádio Olímpico João Havelange on 11 and 12 September. It featured 20 athletes.

The T54 category is for wheelchair athletes with no leg function, but near full arm function and reasonable to normal trunk function. Typically this may be caused by a lower spinal cord injury or spinal cord birth defect.

== Records ==
Prior to the competition, the existing World and Paralympic records were as follows:

World & Paralympic record	Zhang Lixin (CHN)	45.07	10 September 2008	Beijing, China

== Results ==
=== Heats ===
Qualification rule: The first two finishers in each heat (Q) and the next two fastest (q) qualify for the final.

==== Heat 1 ====
Rank	Lane	Athlete	Nationality	Time	Notes
1	4	Liu Yang	China	46.42	Q, PB
2	7	Kenny van Weeghel	Netherlands	46.60	Q
3	6	Yassine Gharbi	Tunisia	46.70	q
4	3	Saichon Konjen	Thailand	47.01	q, SB
5	8	Curtis Thom	Canada	47.93	
6	5	Alex Adelaide	France	49.91	

==== Heat 2 ====
Rank	Lane	Athlete	Nationality	Time	Notes
1	7	Liu Chengming	China	46.87	Q
2	4	Richard Chiassaro	Great Britain	46.98	Q
3	5	Yoshifumi Nagao	Japan	48.85	q
4	6	Daniel Romanchuk	United States	49.15	
5	8	Sam Carter	Australia	49.24	SB
6	2	Alexandre Dupont	Canada	49.28	
7	3	Eduardo Dutra	Uruguay	57.08	PB

==== Heat 3 ====
Rank	Lane	Athlete	Nationality	Time	Notes
1	8	David Weir	Great Britain	46.65	Q
2	5	Cui Yangfeng	China	47.61	Q, SB
3	4	Jake Lappin	Australia	48.88	
4	7	Marc Schuh	Germany	48.89	
5	6	Erik Hightower	United States	49.19	
6	2	Ekkachai Janthon	Thailand	51.15	
7	3	Rashed Aldhaheri	United Arab Emirates	51.36	

=== Final ===
Rank	Lane	Athlete	Nationality	Time	Notes
1st place, gold medalist(s)	5	Kenny van Weeghel	Netherlands	46.65	
2nd place, silver medalist(s)	6	Liu Yang	China	46.79	
3rd place, bronze medalist(s)	2	Yassine Gharbi	Tunisia	47.07	
4	7	Richard Chiassaro	Great Britain	47.17	
5	4	David Weir	Great Britain	47.30	
6	8	Cui Yanfeng	China	47.63	
7	1	Saichon Konjen	Thailand	47.66	
8	3	Liu Chengming	China	47.69	
