= 2011 IPC Athletics World Championships – Men's 5000 metres =

The men's 5000 metres at the 2011 IPC Athletics World Championships is held at the QEII Stadium on 22, and 24–27 January

== Medalists ==
Class	Gold	Silver	Bronze
T11	Odair Santos; Brazil	Immanuel Kipkosgei Cheruiyot; Kenya	Francis Thuo Karanja; Kenya
T12	Abderrahim Zhiou; Tunisia	Henry Kirwa; Kenya	Nacereddine Kerfas; Algeria
T46	Abraham Cheruiyot Tarbei; Kenya	Wondiye Fikre Indelbu; Ethiopia	Tesfalem Gebru Kebede; Ethiopia
T52	Thomas Geierspichler; Austria	Santiago Sanz; Spain	Toshihiro Takada; Japan
T54	David Weir; Great Britain	Marcel Hug; Switzerland	Julien Casoli; France

== T46 ==
The Men's 5000 metres, T46 was held on January 22

T46 = single above or below elbow amputation, or equivalent impairments

=== Results ===
==== Final ====
Rank	Name	Nationality	Time	Notes
1st place, gold medalist(s)	Abraham Cheruiyot Tarbei	Kenya	14:48.29	
2nd place, silver medalist(s)	Wondiye Fikre Indelbu	Ethiopia	14:48.48	
3rd place, bronze medalist(s)	Tesfalem Gebru Kebede	Ethiopia	14:53.32	
4	Stanley Cheruiyot	Kenya	15:05.26	
5	Mario Santillian Hernandez	Mexico	15:12.72	
6	Abdenour Rechidi	Algeria	15:18.15	
7	Pedro Meza Zempoaltecatl	Mexico	15:37.39	
	Samir Nouioua	Algeria	DNF	R 125.5

Key: R 125.5 = Warning by unsporting manner

===== Splits =====
Intermediate	Athlete	Country	Mark
1000m	Mario Santillian Hernandez	Mexico	3:03.53
2000m	Abraham Cheruiyot Tarbei	Kenya	6:03.62
3000m	Abraham Cheruiyot Tarbei	Kenya	8:56.42
4000m	Tesfalem Gebru Kebede	Ethiopia	12:01.94

== See also ==
- List of IPC world records in athletics
