= 2018 World Para Athletics European Championships – Men's 5000 metres =

The men's 5000 metres at the 2018 World Para Athletics European Championships was held at the Friedrich-Ludwig-Jahn-Sportpark in Berlin from 20 to 26 August. Three events were held over this distance.

== Medalists ==
Event	Gold		Silver		Bronze	
T11	Manuel Garnica (ESP) guide : Juan Ignacia Mérida	16:40.08	Aleksander Kossakowski (POL) guide : Krzyzstof Wasilewski	16:45.26	Hasan Kacar (TUR) guides : Umut Kurkcu, Huseyin Gonul	16:48.36
T13	David Devine (GBR)	15:11.28	Alberto Suarez Laso (ESP)	15:16.81	Serhii Bereziuk (UKR)	15:17.35
T54	Marcel Hug (SUI)	11:44.92	Alhassane Balde (GER)	11:45.50	Julien Casoli (FRA)	11:59.34
WR world record | AR area record | CR championship record | GR games record | NR national record | OR Olympic record | PB personal best | SB season best | WL world leading (in a given season)

== See also ==
- List of IPC world records in athletics
