= Switzerland at the 2016 Summer Paralympics =

- IPC code: SUI
- NPC: Swiss Paralympic Committee
- Website: www.swissparalympic.ch

in Rio de Janeiro
- Medals Ranked 41st: Gold 2 Silver 2 Bronze 1 Total 5

Summer Paralympics appearances (overview)
- 1960; 1964; 1968; 1972; 1976; 1980; 1984; 1988; 1992; 1996; 2000; 2004; 2008; 2012; 2016; 2020; 2024

Switzerland competed at the 2016 Summer Paralympics in Rio de Janeiro, Brazil, from 7 to 18 September 2016.

== Disability classifications ==
Every participant at the Paralympics has their disability grouped into one of five disability categories: amputation, the condition may be congenital or sustained through injury or illness; cerebral palsy; wheelchair athletes (there is often overlap between this and other categories); visual impairment, including blindness; and Les autres, any physical disability that does not fall strictly under one of the other categories, for example dwarfism or multiple sclerosis. Each Paralympic sport then has its own classifications, dependent upon the specific physical demands of competition. Events are given a code, made of numbers and letters, describing the type of event and classification of the athletes competing. Some sports, such as athletics, divide athletes by both the category and severity of their disabilities; other sports, for example swimming, group competitors from different categories together, the only separation being based on the severity of the disability.

== Medallists ==
The following Swiss competitors won medals at the Games. In the 'by discipline' sections below, medallists' names are in bold.

Medal	Name	Sport	Event	Date
Gold	Marcel Hug	Athletics	800 m - T54	15 September
Gold	Marcel Hug	Athletics	Men's marathon T54	18 September
Silver	Marcel Hug	Athletics	5000 m - T54	11 September
Silver	Marcel Hug	Athletics	1500 m - T54	13 September

== Archery ==
Switzerland qualified one archer for the Rio Games following their performance at the 2015 World Archery Para Championships. Martin Imboden earned the spot in the men's compound open event after winning the Paralympic secondary tournament.

== Cycling ==
With one pathway for qualification being one highest ranked NPCs on the UCI Para-Cycling male and female Nations Ranking Lists on 31 December 2014, Switzerland qualified for the 2016 Summer Paralympics in Rio, assuming they continued to meet all other eligibility requirements.

== Equestrian ==
The country earned an individual slot via the Para Equestrian Individual Ranking List Allocation method.

== Shooting ==
The last direct qualifying event for Rio in shooting took place at the 2015 IPC Shooting World Cup in Fort Benning in November. Paul Schnider earned a qualifying spot for their country at this competition in the P3 Mixed 25m Pistol SH1 event.

== See also ==
- Switzerland at the 2016 Summer Olympics
