= Swimming at the 2016 Summer Paralympics – Men's 100 metre breaststroke SB11 =

Men's 100 metre breaststroke SB11 at the XV Paralympic Games
- Venue: Olympic Aquatics Stadium
- Dates: 13 September 2016
- Competitors: 9 from 8 nations

Medalists
1st place, gold medalist(s)		Bozun Yang	China
2nd place, silver medalist(s)		Tharon Drake	United States
3rd place, bronze medalist(s)		Keiichi Kimura	Japan

The Men's 100 metre breaststroke SB11 event at the 2016 Paralympic Games took place on 13 September 2016, at the Olympic Aquatics Stadium. Two heats were held. The swimmers with the eight fastest times advanced to the final.

== Heats ==
=== Heat 1 ===
10:47 13 September 2016:

Rank	Lane	Name	Nationality	Time	Notes
1	5	Oleksandr Mashchenko	Ukraine	1:13.75	Q
2	4	Bozun Yang	China	1:15.17	Q
3	3	Brayan Urbano Herrera	Colombia	1:20.74	Q
4	6	Yunerki Ortega	Cuba	1:25.73	Q

=== Heat 2 ===
10:52 13 September 2016:

Rank	Lane	Name	Nationality	Time	Notes
1	5	Keiichi Kimura	Japan	1:15.05	Q
2	4	Tharon Drake	United States	1:15.58	Q
3	3	Viktor Smyrnov	Ukraine	1:18.20	Q
4	2	Miroslav Smrcka	Czech Republic	1:23.65	Q
5	6	Panom Lagsanaprim	Thailand	1:27.90	

== Final ==
18:44 13 September 2016:

Rank	Lane	Name	Nationality	Time	Notes
1st place, gold medalist(s)	3	Bozun Yang	China	1:10.08	WR
2nd place, silver medalist(s)	6	Tharon Drake	United States	1:11.50	
3rd place, bronze medalist(s)	5	Keiichi Kimura	Japan	1:12.88	
4	4	Oleksandr Mashchenko	Ukraine	1:13.53	
5	2	Viktor Smyrnov	Ukraine	1:15.69	
6	7	Brayan Urbano Herrera	Colombia	1:19.27	
7	1	Miroslav Smrcka	Czech Republic	1:21.92	
8	8	Yunerki Ortega	Cuba	1:27.45	
