= Peyman Nasiri =

Iranian Paralympic athlete

Peyman Nasiri Bazanjani
Personal information
- Nationality: Iranian
- Born: 10 June 1980 (age 46)

Sport
- Country: Iran
- Sport: Track and field
- Disability class: (T20)
- Event: middle-distance running
- Club: Kerman County
- Coached by: Bahman Rezaei (national); Sajad Moradi (personal)
Medal record
Paralympic athletics
Representing Iran
Paralympic Games
Gold medal – first place	2012 London	1500 m – T20
Bronze medal – third place	2016 Rio de Janeiro	1500 m – T20
IPC World Championships
Gold medal – first place	2011 Christchurch	1500m – T20
Gold medal – first place	2013 Lyon	1500m – T20
Silver medal – second place	2015 Doha	1500m – T20
Asian Para Games
Gold medal – first place	2014 Incheon	Men's 1500m – T20
Gold medal – first place	2018 Jakarta	Men's 1500m – T20
Bronze medal – third place	2014 Incheon	Men's 400m – T20

Peyman Nasiri Bazanjani (born 10 June 1980) is a Paralympic athlete from Iran who competes in T20 classification middle-distance running events. Nasiri Bazanjani represented Iran at the 2012 Summer Paralympics in London, where he won Gold in the 1500 m race. He is also a two-time winner of the 1,500 m race at the IPC World Championships, in Christchurch in 2011 and in Lyon in 2013.
