= Wheelchair racing at the 2004 Summer Olympics =

Wheelchair racing at the 2004 Summer Olympics featured as a demonstration event within the athletics programme at the Athens Olympic Stadium on 22 August 2004. There were two events: an 800 m race for women and a 1500 m race for men. Medals were not awarded, as the sport was not part of the official competition.

== Men's 1500 m wheelchair ==
Rank	Name	Nationality	Time	Notes
1	Robert Figl	Germany	3:10.91	
2	Saúl Mendoza	Mexico	3:11.35	
3	Rawat Tana	Thailand	3:11.48	
4	Scot Hollonbeck	United States	3:11.49	
5	Kurt Fearnley	Australia	3:11.60	
6	Choke Yasuoka	Japan	3:11.75	
7	Joël Jeannot	France	3:22.14	
8	Jeff Adams	Canada	—	DNF

== Women's 800 m wheelchair ==
Rank	Name	Nationality	Time	Notes
1	Chantal Petitclerc	Canada	1:53.66	OR
2	Eliza Stankovich	Australia	1:53.84	
3	Louise Sauvage	Australia	1:53.92	
4	Diane Roy	Canada	1:54.20	
5	Cheri Blauwet	United States	1:54.22	
6	Edith Hunkeler	Switzerland	1:54.68	
7	Christie Dawes	Australia	1:55.97	
8	Tanni Grey-Thompson	Great Britain	1:56.87	

== See also ==
- Athletics at the 2004 Summer Paralympics
- . Technological Advancements in Wheelchair Manufacturing.
- Athletics at the 2004 Athens Summer Games: Men's 1,500 metres Wheelchair. Sports Reference. Retrieved on 2014-05-11.
- Athletics at the 2004 Athens Summer Games: Women's 800 metres Wheelchair. Sports Reference. Retrieved on 2014-05-11.
