= 2015 IPC Athletics World Championships – Men's 5000 metres =

The men's 5,000 metres at the 2015 IPC Athletics World Championships was held at the Suheim Bin Hamad Stadium in Doha from 22 to 31 October.

== Medalists ==
Event	Gold		Silver		Bronze	
T11	Cristian Valenzuela; Guides: Raul Moya, Mauricio Valdivia; Chile	15:52.64 SB	Jason Joseph Dunkerley; Guides: Joshua Karanja; Canada	16:11.22	Shinya Wada; Guides: Takashi Nakata; Japan	16:31.04
T13	Guillaume Ouellet (T13); Canada	15:07.64	Alberto Suarez Laso (T12); Spain	15:11.01 SB	Youssef Benibrahim (T13); Morocco	15:11.89
T20	Daisuke Nakagawa; Japan	15:39.43	Michael Brannigan; United States	15:50.99	Jose Azevedo; Portugal	16.21.28
T54	Rawat Tana; Thailand	10:55.85	Marcel Hug; Switzerland	10.56.32	Prawat Wahoram; Thailand	10.56.54
WR world record | AR area record | CR championship record | GR games record | NR national record | OR Olympic record | PB personal best | SB season best | WL world leading (in a given season)

== See also ==
- List of IPC world records in athletics
