= Marcel Hug =

Swiss wheelchair racer (born 1986)

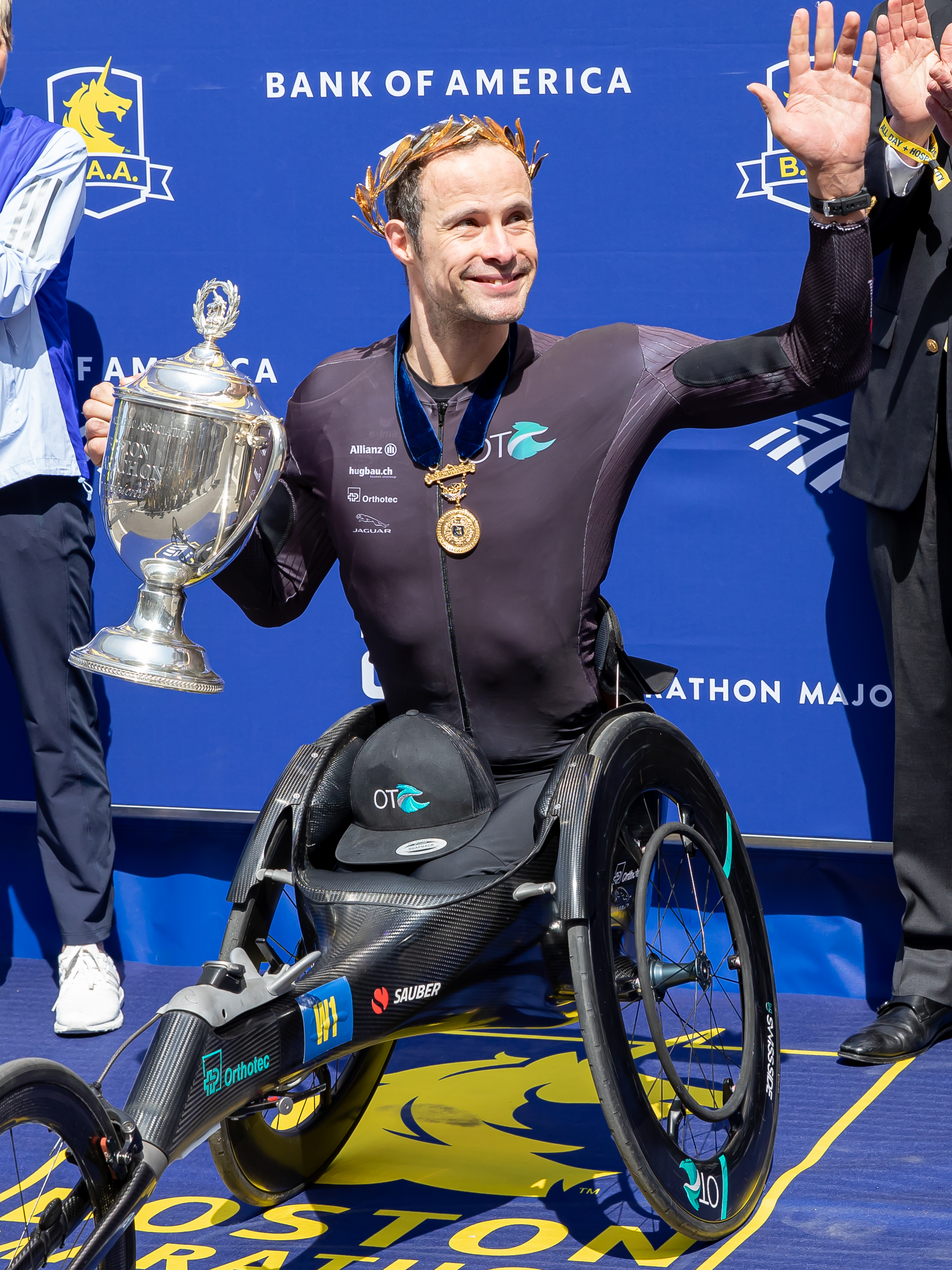
- Hug after winning at the 2025 Boston Marathon

Personal information
- Nickname: The Silver Bullet
- Born: Marcel Eric Hug; 16 January 1986 (age 40) Pfyn, Thurgau, Switzerland
- Years active: 2005–present
- Website: marcelhug.com

Sport
- Disability: Spinal cord injuries
- Disability class: T54
- Club: RC Zentralschweiz; RC Thurgau
- Turned pro: 2010
- Coached by: Paul Odermatt
Medal record
Men's para athletics
Representing Switzerland
Event	1st	2nd	3rd
Paralympic Games	7	6	3
World Championships	13	9	1
European Championships	6	0	1
Paralympic Games
Gold medal – first place	2020 Tokyo	Marathon T54
Gold medal – first place	2020 Tokyo	800 m T54
Gold medal – first place	2020 Tokyo	1500 m T54
Gold medal – first place	2020 Tokyo	5000 m T54
Gold medal – first place	2016 Rio	Marathon T54
Gold medal – first place	2016 Rio	800 m T54
Gold medal – first place	2024 Paris	Marathon T54
Silver medal – second place	2016 Rio	1500 m T54
Silver medal – second place	2016 Rio	5000 m T54
Silver medal – second place	2012 London	800 m T54
Silver medal – second place	2012 London	Marathon T54
Silver medal – second place	2024 Paris	1500 m T54
Silver medal – second place	2024 Paris	5000 m T54
Bronze medal – third place	2004 Athens	800 m T54
Bronze medal – third place	2004 Athens	1500 m T54
Bronze medal – third place	2024 Paris	800 m T54
World Championships
Gold medal – first place	2006 Assen	10000 m T54
Gold medal – first place	2011 Christchurch	10000 m T54
Gold medal – first place	2013 Lyon	400 m T54
Gold medal – first place	2013 Lyon	1500 m T54
Gold medal – first place	2013 Lyon	5000 m T54
Gold medal – first place	2013 Lyon	10000 m T54
Gold medal – first place	2013 Lyon	Marathon T54
Gold medal – first place	2017 London	800 m T54
Gold medal – first place	2017 London	1500 m T54
Gold medal – first place	2023 Paris	800 m T54
Gold medal – first place	2023 Paris	1500 m T54
Gold medal – first place	2023 Paris	5000 m T54
Gold medal – first place	2025 New Delhi	5000 m T54
Silver medal – second place	2006 Assen	400 m T54
Silver medal – second place	2006 Assen	800 m T54
Silver medal – second place	2006 Assen	5000 m T54
Silver medal – second place	2011 Christchurch	400 m T54
Silver medal – second place	2011 Christchurch	800 m T54
Silver medal – second place	2011 Christchurch	1500 m T54
Silver medal – second place	2011 Christchurch	5000 m T54
Silver medal – second place	2013 Lyon	800 m T54
Silver medal – second place	2015 Doha	5000 m T54
Bronze medal – third place	2015 Doha	800 m T54
European Championships
Gold medal – first place	2014 Swansea	800 m T54
Gold medal – first place	2014 Swansea	1500 m T54
Gold medal – first place	2014 Swansea	5000 m T54
Gold medal – first place	2018 Berlin	800 m T54
Gold medal – first place	2018 Berlin	1500 m T54
Gold medal – first place	2018 Berlin	5000 m T54
Bronze medal – third place	2014 Swansea	400 m T54

Marcel Eric Hug (German: [maʁˈsɛl ˈhuːɡ]; born 16 January 1986) is a Paralympic athlete from Switzerland competing in category T54 wheelchair racing events. Hug, nicknamed 'The Silver Bullet', has competed in four Summer Paralympic Games for Switzerland, winning two bronze medals in his first Games in Athens in 2004. In 2010 he set four world records in four days, and at the 2011 World Championships he won a gold in the 10,000 metres and four silver medals, losing the gold in three events to long term rival David Weir. This rivalry continued into the 2012 Summer Paralympics in London, where Hug won two silvers, in the 800m and the marathon. In the 2013 World Championships Hug dominated the field, winning five golds and a silver. During the 2016 Summer Paralympics in Rio, Hug was one of the most consistent competitors in the T54 class, winning two golds, in the 800m and marathon, and two silvers medals, in the 1500m and 5000m.

As well as numerous World and European track medals, Hug is also a world class marathon athlete, setting the course records for the Boston, Chicago, New York and London Marathons as well as winning the men's elite wheelchair event at the Berlin (2011, 2012, 2016, 2017, 2019, 2021, 2022, 2023, 2024, 2025, 2026), New York City (2013, 2016, 2017, 2021, 2022, 2023, 2025, 2026), London (2014, 2016, 2021, 2022, 2023, 2024, 2025, 2026), Chicago (2016, 2017, 2022, 2023, 2024, 2025, 2026), Tokyo (2019, 2021, 2023, 2026), Boston Marathon (2015, 2016, 2017, 2018, 2021, 2023, 2024, 2025, 2026) and Sydney (2025).

== Career history ==
=== Early career ===
Hug was born in the municipality of Pfyn in Switzerland in 1986. Born with spina bifida, Hug grew up on a farm, the youngest of four brothers. As a young child, he met Swiss wheelchair racer, and Hug's sporting idol, Franz Nietlispach, beginning Hug's desire to take up athletics. The ten-year-old Hug was introduced to racing when a sports teacher bought him an old racing wheelchair. This led to Hug competing in his first wheelchair race that year, the 3 km youth race which was part of the Schenkon Marathon. Winning this event inspired him to take up wheelchair athletics and he joined the Swiss Paraplegic Centre in Nottwil where he teamed up with trainer Paul Odermatt.

The following years saw Hug develop from a junior athlete into an elite racer and he began competing in both Switzerland and abroad. In 2001 he made the athletics team for Wheelchair Sport Switzerland (Rollstuhlsport Schweiz), and the same year he was accepted into the sports school at Kreuzlingen. Hug described the fact that he was the only wheelchair athlete at the school as being "immensely important for my personal development." In 2002 Hug accepted a place at the Schule für Beruf und Weiterbildung (School for Employment and Further Education) in Romanshorn, believing that an education outside sport would be vital in his later life.

=== Elite career ===
Hug competed in his first world class international when he was selected to represent Switzerland at the 2004 Summer Paralympics in Athens despite not being part of the national team setup. He took part in both men's wheelchair relay races the 4 × 100m T53–T54 and 4 × 400m T53–T54, although Switzerland failed to progress through to the finals in either events. As an individual he competed in four races, reaching the finals in each. He failed to medal in the 400m and 5000m but finishing third in both the 800m (1:32.66) and 1500m (3:05.48) where he won his two bronze medals. On returning from the Games he was named Newcomer of the Year 2004 by Credit Suisse Sports Award and the following year he graduated to the Swiss national team.

In 2006 Hug competed for Switzerland at the IPC Athletics World Championships in Assen in the Netherlands. There he took his first major international gold medal when he won the men's 10,000m in the T54 (23:06.71). He collected a further three medals at the games, silvers in the 400m (48.97), 800m (1:39.10) and 5,000m (11:20.68). In the 400m he lost the gold to British racer David Weir, beginning a rivalry between the two athletes that would define many of their races on the track and in marathons over the following years.

In 2008 Hug travelled to Beijing with the Swiss team to compete in the Summer Paralympics. There he competed in four tracks events: the 400m, 800m, 1,500m and 5,000m; and the marathon. By his own admission the games were a disappointment, as he failed to record a single podium finish, crashing out in both the 1,500m and the marathon. His fortunes changed over the next two years and this was highlighted by his results in the 2010 season. Between the 24 and 27 June 2010 Hug competed at a race meet in Switzerland. There he set new world records in four events in the T54 category: the 800m (1:31.12), 1,500m (2:54.51), 5,000m (9:53.05) and 10,000m (19:50.04).

The next major competition for Hug was the 2011 IPC Athletics World Championship held in Christchurch, New Zealand. Despite going into the Championship as the new world champion, David Weir, whose records Hug had broken in 2010, was also hitting form as he eyed the Paralympic finals in his home capital of London in 2012. Hug ambitiously entered all eight events available to him. He was disqualified from his less favoured sprint events, the 100m and 200m, but in the mid distance 400m, he took the silver, finishing second to China's Liu Chengming. In the 800m, 1,500m and 5,000m Hug faced Weir in the finals, and was unable to beat his British rival, taking silver behind Weir in all three events. Hug was still able to leave the Championship with a gold when he took the 10,000m, but failed to complete the marathon. It was during these championships that Hug gained the nickname 'The Silver Bullet', given to him in reference to his trademark silver helmet that he wears when racing.

2011 also saw Hug win his first major city marathon event when he came first in the 2011 Berlin Marathon.

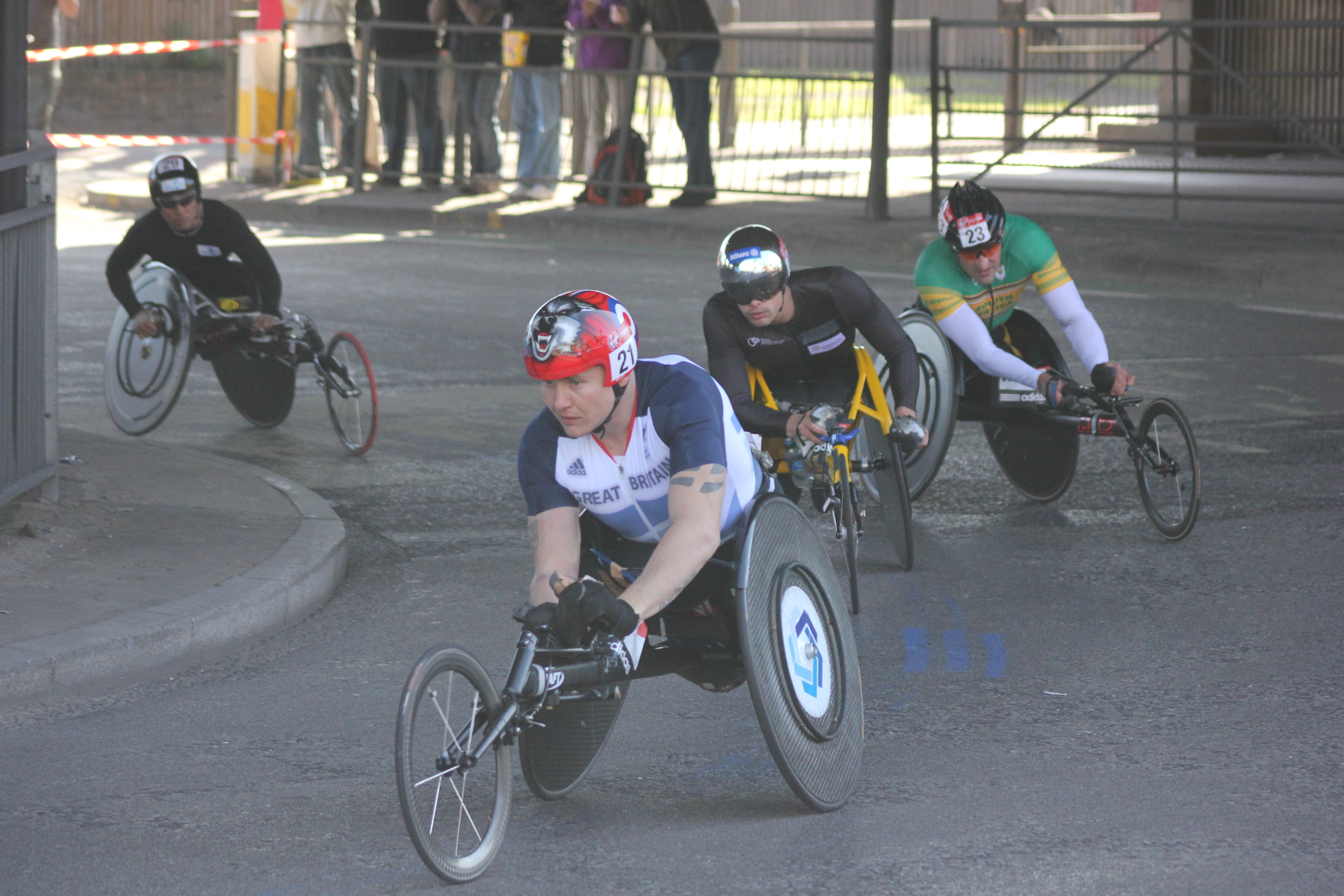
Hug, in his trademark silver helmet challenges David Weir at the 2013 London Marathon

The 2011 World Championships set the scene for the build-up to the 2012 Summer Paralympics, held in London. Hug entered five events, reaching the finals in all of them. In the 400m he qualified in second place in his heat, but finished fifth in the final. In the 800m he came through his heat in second place to David Weir, and the result was repeated in the final, Hug taking silver to Weir's gold. In both the 1,500m and 5,000m he finished just outside the medals in fourth place. In the marathon, the final race of the Athletics program of the Paralympics, only a second separated Weir in gold, Hug in silver and Australia's Kurt Fearnley in bronze. Hug completed 2012 by retaining his marathon crown in German by winning the 2012 Berlin Marathon.

Weir's decision not to compete at the 2013 IPC Athletics World Championships in Lyon, opened up the field. Hug took full opportunity of the situation and dominated the T54 track events. He entered six events winning gold in five of them: 400 metres, 1,500 metres, 5,000 metres, 10,000 metres and Marathon. The only person to best him at the Championship was Kim Gyu-Dae of South Korea who pushed Hug into silver medal position in the 800 metres. In November 2013 Hug entered his fourth New York Marathon, and in a close race edged out South Africa's Ernst Van Dyk to take the title.

On 13 April 2014, a week after winning the Paris Marathon, Hug entered the London Marathon, beating his long-time rival Weir into second place to take the men's wheelchair title. This was Hug's first London Marathon win after finishing second in 2010, 2012 and 2013.

After finishing fourth in the last two attempts, on 20 April 2015 Hug finished first in the Boston Marathon, beating ten-times winner Ernst Van Dyk into second place by over six minutes. Later that year Hug competed in the 2015 IPC Athletics World Championships in Doha, with commentators believing the major medals would be contested between Hug and Weir. Instead the longer events were dominated by Thailand's Rawat Tana, who took gold in both the 1500m and 5000m. Hug finished fifth in the 1500m but managed to win a silver in the 5000m. Hug also entered the 800m, where he finished third to collect his second medal of the games. In 2016 Hug won two elite city marathon events in the space of a week. On 18 April Hug won his second Boston Marathon with a time of 1:24.01, and followed this six days later with his second London Marathon victory.

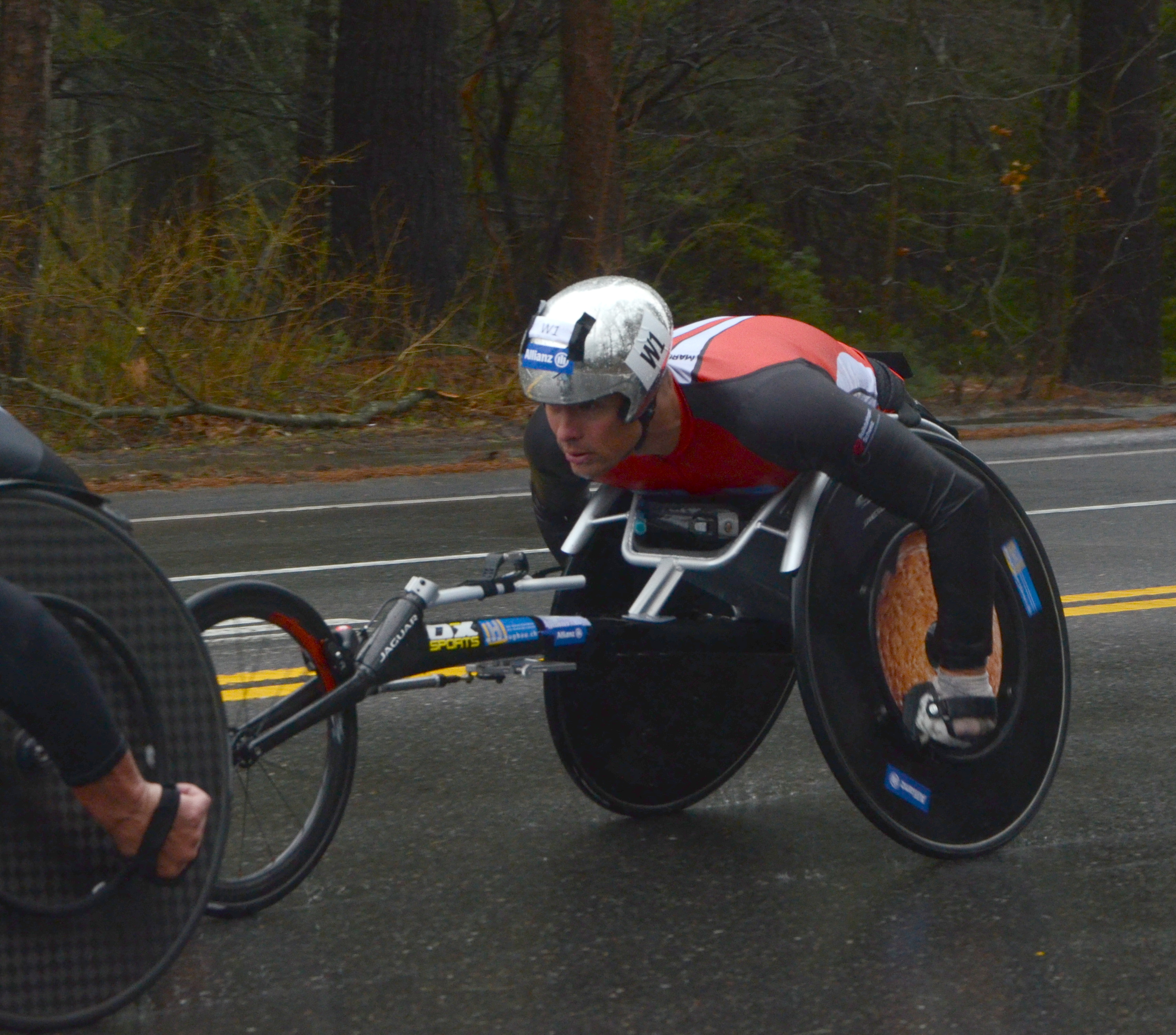
Marcel Hug near halfway point of the Boston Marathon in 2018.

In 2016 Hug qualified for his fourth consecutive Paralympics, travelling to Rio de Janeiro where he took part in four events at the 2016 Summer Paralympics. He won medals in all four events, two silvers in the 1500m and 5000m races and his first Paralympic gold medals, one in the 800m and then on the last day he also won the men's T54 marathon. After Rio, Hug continued to compete on the World Marathon circuit, and in October he won his first Chicago Marathon, beating Kurt Fearnley in a photo finish. In November, in a repeat of a photo finish against Kurt Fearnley, he won his second New York City Marathon.

In October 2022, Hug won the 2022 London Marathon, with a time of 1:24:38, two seconds ahead of American competitor Daniel Romanchuk. The following year, Hug returned for his fourth Chicago Marathon where he surpassed his previous record with a time of 1:22:37. In April 2025, Hug won the Boston Marathon for the eighth time.
