= Santiago Sanz (parathlete) =

Spanish Paralympic athlete

Medal record

Paralympic athletics

Representing Spain

Paralympic Games
Silver medal – second place	2000 Sydney	5000 metres - T52
Silver medal – second place	2004 Athens	1500 metres - T52
Bronze medal – third place	2000 Sydney	800 metres - T52
Bronze medal – third place	2004 Athens	5000 metres - T52

Santiago José Sanz Quinto is a Paralympic athlete from Spain competing mainly in category T52 wheelchair racing events.

Santiago has competed in four Paralympics, winning a total of four medals. At his debut in the 2000 Paralympics, he won a silver in the 5000m and bronze in the 800m, while also competing in the 1500m. He then competed in Athens for the 2004 Summer Paralympics, where he again won a silver and bronze, this time in the 1500m and 5000m, respectively. He also again competed in the 800m. In 2008 he competed in the 800m and marathon but failed to medal in either. Sanz' final Paralympics came at the 2016 Rio Games, where he finished sixth in the men's 1500 T52. Sanz has also competed in multiple world championships and won four gold medals in 2006.
