= Yoshifumi Nagao =

Japanese Paralympic athlete

Medal record

Paralympic athletics

Representing Japan

Paralympic Games
Bronze medal – third place	2004 Athens	4x400m - T53-54

Yoshifumi Nagao (永尾 嘉章, Nagao Yoshifumi) is a Paralympian athlete from Japan competing mainly in category T54 sprint events.

Yoshifumi has competed in every Summer Paralympics between 1988 and 2008, normally in the 100m,200m and 400m but in other distances including the 1992 marathon. His first and so far only medal came as part of the Japanese 4 × 400 m bronze medal-winning team in 2004.
