= Joël Jeannot =

French wheelchair racer

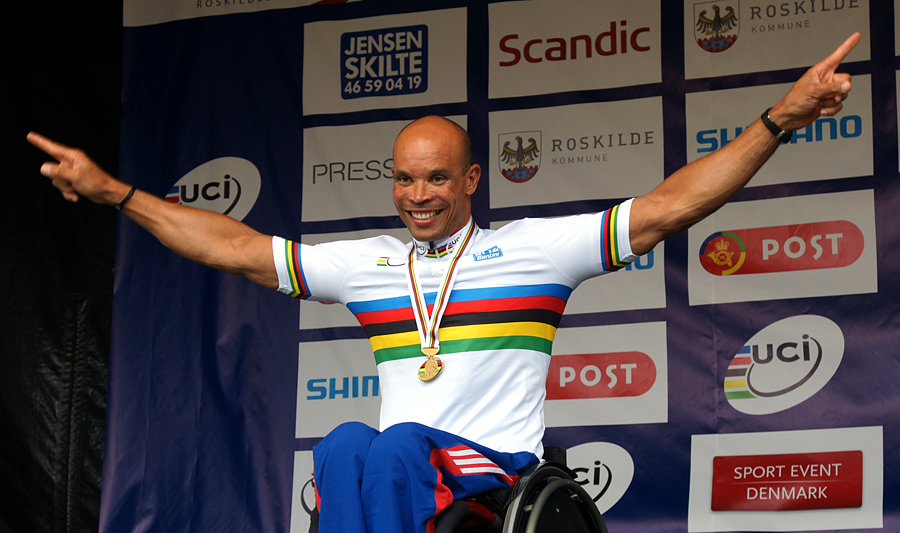
- Jeannot, World Champion 2011 in para-cycling (handbike roadrace), Roskilde, Denmark

Personal information
- Born: 23 September 1965 (age 60)

Sport
- Sport: Track and field, Road cycling
- Disability class: T54, H4
Medal record
Representing France
Paralympic Games
Men's para-athletics
Gold medal – first place	2000 Sydney	4x400 m T54
Gold medal – first place	2004 Athens	10000 m T54
Silver medal – second place	2004 Athens	4x400 m T53/54
Men's para-cycling
Bronze medal – third place	2012 London	Road race H3
Bronze medal – third place	2016 Rio de Janeiro	Road race H4

Joël Jeannot (French: [ʒɔ.ɛl ʒa.no]; born 23 September 1965) is a French Olympic wheelchair racer and handisport activist. From 2007 he started competing in handbikes, winning a lot of French championships as well as several world championships in para-cycling.

At the 2004 Olympic Games, he finished 7th in the demonstration sport of Men's 1,500 m wheelchair. He also participated in the 2004 Summer Paralympics, where he took gold in the 10,000 metre race and silver in the 4×400 metre relay. Four years earlier, at the 2000 Paralympics, he won a gold medal in the 4×400 metre relay.

He has also won the wheelchair division of the London Marathon in 2003 in a record time, and finished second in the Boston Marathon the following year.

He won the 2003 World Championships in Athletics 1,500 m event.
