= Éric Teurnier =

French Paralympic athlete

Medal record

Track and field (athletics)

Representing France

Paralympic Games
Silver medal – second place	2004 Athens	4x400m - T53-54

Éric Teurnier is a Paralympian athlete from France competing mainly in category T54 middle to long-distance events.

Eric competed in the 2004 Summer Paralympics in Athens in the 800m, 1500m and 5000m but it was when he was part of the French 4 × 400 m relay team that he won his only medal, a silver.
