= Prawat Wahoram =

Thai wheelchair racer

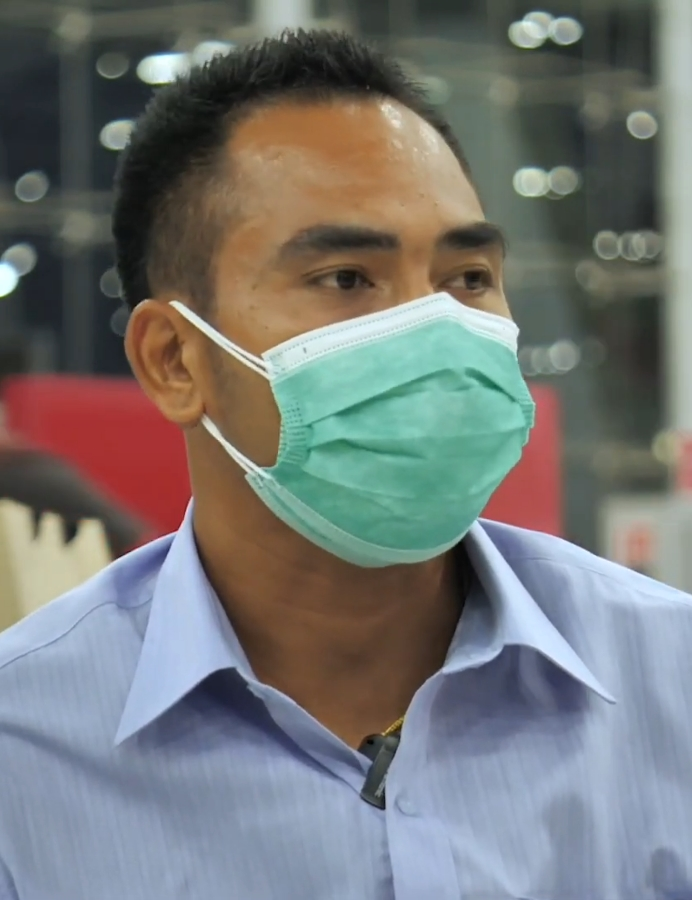

Personal information
- Native name: ประวัติ วะโฮรัมย์
- Nickname: Wat
- Born: 24 March 1981 (age 45) Sa Kaeo, Thailand

Sport
- Disability: Impaired muscle power
- Disability class: T54

Achievements and titles
- Paralympic finals: 2000; 2004; 2008; 2012; 2016; 2020
Medal record
Men's para athletics
Representing Thailand
Event	1st	2nd	3rd
Paralympic Games	7	8	1
World Championships	2	2	2
Paralympic Games
Gold medal – first place	2000 Sydney	10000 m T54
Gold medal – first place	2000 Sydney	5000 m T54
Gold medal – first place	2004 Athens	4×100 m T53–54
Gold medal – first place	2004 Athens	4×400 m T53–54
Gold medal – first place	2008 Beijing	5000 m T54
Gold medal – first place	2016 Rio	1500 m T54
Gold medal – first place	2016 Rio de Janeiro	5000 m T54
Silver medal – second place	2004 Athens	10000 m T54
Silver medal – second place	2008 Beijing	1500 m T54
Silver medal – second place	2008 Beijing	4×100 m T53–54
Silver medal – second place	2008 Beijing	4×400 m T53–54
Silver medal – second place	2012 London	1500 m T54
Silver medal – second place	2012 London	4×400 m T53–54
Silver medal – second place	2016 Rio de Janeiro	4×400 m T53–54
Silver medal – second place	2020 Tokyo	1500 m T54
Bronze medal – third place	2008 Beijing	800 m T54
World Championships
Gold medal – first place	2019 Dubai	1,500 m T54
Gold medal – first place	2019 Dubai	5,000 m T54
Silver medal – second place	2015 Doha	4x400 m relay T53–54
Silver medal – second place	2023 Paris	5000 m T54
Bronze medal – third place	2015 Doha	5000 m T54
Bronze medal – third place	2023 Paris	1500 m T54
Asian Para Games
Gold medal – first place	2010 Guangzhou	1500 m T54
Gold medal – first place	2010 Guangzhou	5000 m T54
Gold medal – first place	2018 Jakarta	1500 m T54
Gold medal – first place	2018 Jakarta	5000 m T54
Gold medal – first place	2022 Hangzhou	1500 m T54
Gold medal – first place	2022 Hangzhou	5000 m T54
Silver medal – second place	2010 Guangzhou	4x100 m relay T53-54
Silver medal – second place	2014 Incheon	5000 m T54
Bronze medal – third place	2022 Hangzhou	800 m T54

Prawat Wahoram (Thai: ประวัติ วะโฮรัมย์; born 24 March 1981) is a Paralympian athlete from Thailand competing in category T54 wheelchair racing events. He competed for Thailand in six Paralympic Games from 2000 to 2020 and got the total of seven gold, eight silver, and one bronze medals. He is considered the most successful Thai Paralympic athlete.

== Career ==
Competing in wheelchair athletics, Wahoram has represented Thailand at the Paralympic Games on six occasions. He won his first medals, two gold, at the 2000 Summer Paralympics in Sydney, winning the 5000 m and 10000 m races in the T54 category.

Wahoram competed in the 2004 Summer Paralympics at various distances, the 800 m, 1500 m, 5000 m and 10000 m race. He won an individual silver in the 10000 m race, as well as two gold medals in team events in the 4 × 100 m and 4 × 400 m relays.

At the 2008 Summer Paralympics, he won a gold medal in the 5000 metres event as well as three silver and one bronze medals.

== Major results ==
Year	Venue	Events	Heat		Semifinal		Final		Rank
Year	Venue	Events	Time	Rank	Time	Rank	Time	Rank	Rank
Paralympic Games
2020	Tokyo, Japan	800 m T54	1:33.59	1 Q	—N/a		1:34.58	6	
2020	Tokyo, Japan	1500 m T54	3:03.07	1 Q	—N/a		2:50.20 AR	2	2nd place, silver medalist(s)
2020	Tokyo, Japan	5000 m T54	10:14.91	1 Q	—N/a		10:30.59	6	
2016	Rio de Janeiro, Brazil	800 m T54	1:38.25	5	—N/a		Did not advance		
2016	Rio de Janeiro, Brazil	1500 m T54	3:06.55	1 Q	—N/a		3:00.63	1	1st place, gold medalist(s)
2016	Rio de Janeiro, Brazil	5000 m T54	10:20.34	2 Q	—N/a		11:01.71	1	1st place, gold medalist(s)
2016	Rio de Janeiro, Brazil	Marathon T54	—N/a		—N/a		1:30:09	5	
2016	Rio de Janeiro, Brazil	4 × 400 m T53–54	3:08.37	1 Q	—N/a		3:07.73	2	2nd place, silver medalist(s)
2012	London, United Kingdom	1500 m T54	3:11.31	2 Q	—N/a		3:12.32	2	2nd place, silver medalist(s)
2012	London, United Kingdom	5000 m T54	10:56.74	3 Q	—N/a		11:08.55	5	
2012	London, United Kingdom	4 × 400 m T53–54	3:14.29	1 q	—N/a		3:13.28	2	2nd place, silver medalist(s)
2008	Beijing, China	800 m T54	1:38.84	Q	1:34.59	Q	1:37.12	3	3rd place, bronze medalist(s)
2008	Beijing, China	1500 m T54	3:09.24	Q	3:00.10 PR	Q	3:10.68	2	2nd place, silver medalist(s)
2008	Beijing, China	5000 m T54	10:21.31	Q	—N/a		10:22.38	1	1st place, gold medalist(s)
2008	Beijing, China	Marathon T54	—N/a		—N/a		DNS		
2008	Beijing, China	4 × 400 m T53–54	3:15.65	2 Q	—N/a		3:11.63	2	2nd place, silver medalist(s)
2004	Athens, Greece	800m T54	1:35.93	6 q	—N/a		1:33.03	7	
2004	Athens, Greece	1500m T54	3:08.24	18 Q	3:04.85	4 q	3:06.15	7	
2004	Athens, Greece	5000m T54	10:29.43	9 Q	—N/a		10:25.56	8	
2004	Athens, Greece	10000m T54	21:47.93	10 Q	—N/a		20:52.10	2	2nd place, silver medalist(s)
2004	Athens, Greece	4 × 100 m T53–54	51.98 WR	1 Q	—N/a		51.99	1	1st place, gold medalist(s)
2004	Athens, Greece	4 × 400 m T53–54	3:16.56	3 Q	—N/a		3:12.73 WR	1	1st place, gold medalist(s)
World Championships
2015	Doha, Qatar	100 m T53	15.71	3	—N/a		16.22	7	7
2015	Doha, Qatar	200 m T53	26.96	2	—N/a		26.97	2	2nd place, silver medalist(s)
2015	Doha, Qatar	400 m T53	51.51	2	—N/a		50.42	3	3rd place, bronze medalist(s)
2015	Doha, Qatar	800 m T53	1:47.90	2	—N/a		1:44.35	4	6
2015	Doha, Qatar	4 × 400 m T53–54	—N/a		—N/a		3.12.22 NR	2	2nd place, silver medalist(s)
