= David Weir (athlete) =

British wheelchair athlete

David Weir CBE
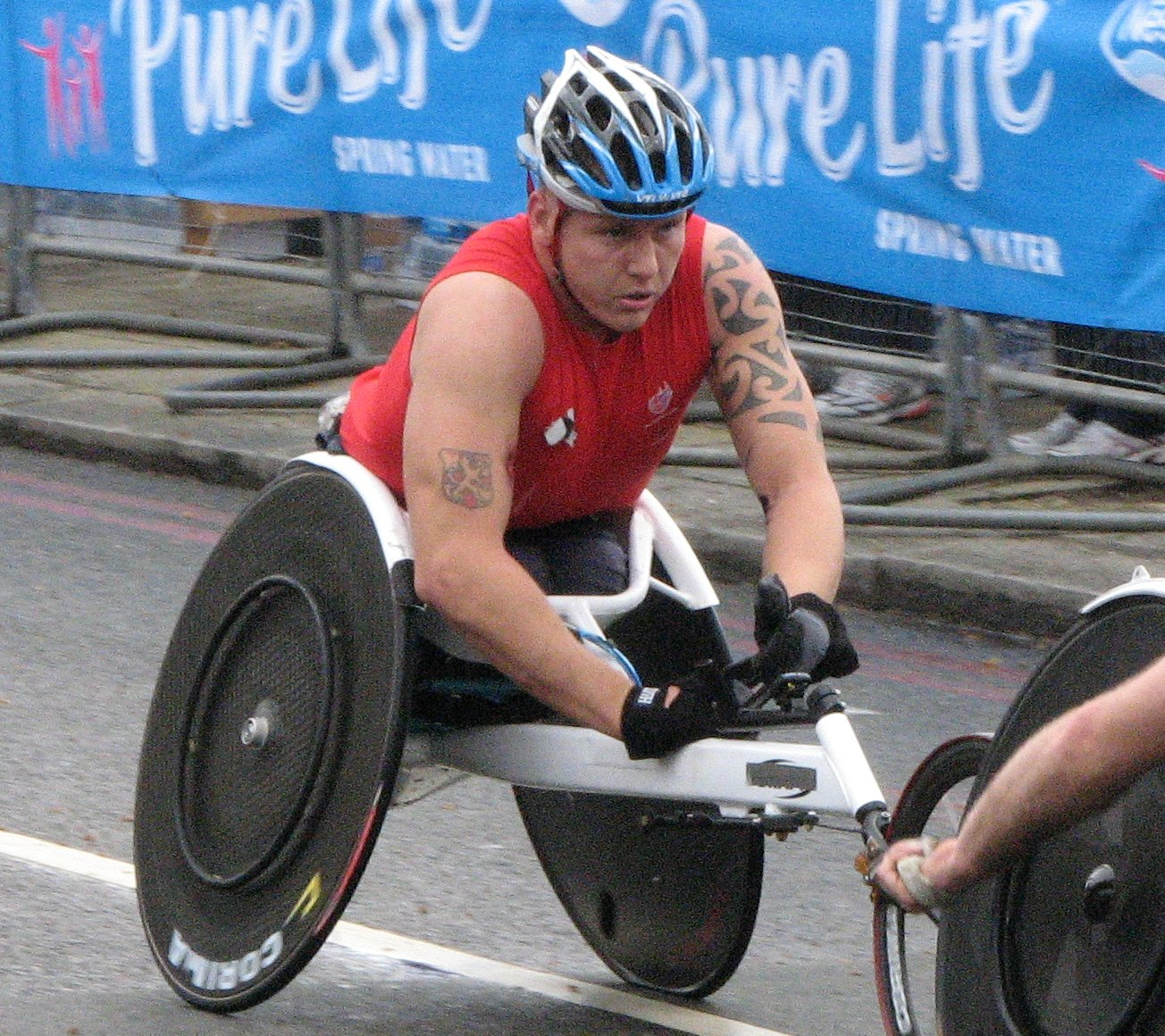
- Weir during the 2010 London Marathon

Personal information
- Born: 5 June 1979 (age 47) Wallington, London, United Kingdom

Sport
- Sport: Men's para athletics
- Disability class: T54
Medal record
Men's para athletics
Representing Great Britain
Paralympic Games
Gold medal – first place	2008 Beijing	800 m T54
Gold medal – first place	2008 Beijing	1500 m T54
Gold medal – first place	2012 London	1500 m T54
Gold medal – first place	2012 London	5000 m T54
Gold medal – first place	2012 London	800 m T54
Gold medal – first place	2012 London	Marathon T54
Silver medal – second place	2004 Athens	100 m T54
Silver medal – second place	2008 Beijing	400 m T54
Bronze medal – third place	2004 Athens	200 m T54
Bronze medal – third place	2008 Beijing	5000 m T54
World Championships
Gold medal – first place	2006 Assen	100m T54
Gold medal – first place	2006 Assen	400m T54
Gold medal – first place	2006 Assen	1500m T54
Gold medal – first place	2011 Christchurch	800 m T54
Gold medal – first place	2011 Christchurch	1500 m T54
Gold medal – first place	2011 Christchurch	5000 m T54
Silver medal – second place	2006 Assen	200m T54
Silver medal – second place	2015 Doha	1,500 m T54
World Cup
Gold medal – first place	2007 Manchester	400 m T54
Gold medal – first place	2007 Manchester	1500 m T54
European Championships
Gold medal – first place	2005 Helsinki	400m T54
Gold medal – first place	2016 Grosseto	400m T54
Gold medal – first place	2016 Grosseto	800m T54
Gold medal – first place	2016 Grosseto	5000m T54
Silver medal – second place	2005 Helsinki	200m T54
Bronze medal – third place	2005 Helsinki	100m T54
Representing England
Commonwealth Games
Gold medal – first place	2014 Glasgow	1500 m T54

David Russell Weir CBE (born 5 June 1979) is a British Paralympic wheelchair athlete. He has won a total of six gold medals at the 2008 and 2012 Paralympic Games, and has won the London Marathon on eight occasions. He was born with a spinal cord transection that left him unable to use his legs.

== Personal life ==
Weir was born in Wallington, part of the London Borough of Sutton. He cannot use his legs due to a congenital spinal cord transection. As a child he was a talented wheelchair athlete, representing Sutton in wheelchair athletics at the London Youth Games, and won the junior event at the London marathon (the mini wheelchair race) seven times. At school Weir was frustrated by a lack of sporting activities for wheelchair users, but after years of persistence he developed a skill for wheelchair racing that would define his career and lead to multiple Paralympic successes.

Weir has four children: Mason, Lenny, Tillia, and Ronie. After winning the 800m at the 2012 Paralympics, Weir said "This one is for my kids tonight."

== Professional life ==
In 2002, Jenny Archer became Weir's coach, and he credited her following his first London marathon victory later that year. The two maintained a long-term professional relationship, and following his success at the 2012 Summer Paralympics, Weir described Archer as the "best in the world by far".

Along with coach Jenny Archer, Weir runs the Weir Archer Academy (launched April 2013). The academy's goal is to increase participation in disability sport and nurture the next generation of Paralympians.

In 2007 Weir joined Lucozade Sport as an Ambassador for their line of energy drinks.

Weir has often acknowledged the help that National Lottery funding has given him in being able to compete as an elite athlete. He told The Daily Telegraph, "For me personally, Lottery funding through UK Sport for 10 years has been life-changing and has helped me become the best wheelchair racer in the world." Weir trains at the Weir Archer Athletics and Fitness Centre, formerly the Kingsmeadow Athletics Stadium, in Kingston upon Thames, Surrey.

== Marathons ==
=== London Marathons ===
Weir finished fifth in the 2000 London Marathon setting a time of 1:47:11. In the 2001 London Marathon, he finished third in a time of 1:50:05.

His breakthrough in the competition came in 2002 when, as the youngest competitor in his category, he won in a time of 1:39:44. Before the race Weir's personal best fell outside the top twelve competitors at that year's Marathon, and he was not considered a serious challenger. But at the age of 21, he beat his personal best by seven seconds to win the race. Weir's training partner Tushar Patel, both members of Kingsmeadow-based Velocity Wheelchair Racing Club, finished a minute and half behind in second place. After the race, Weir said: "It was a childhood dream to win the London Marathon and I'm extremely happy with how the race went. I was sure people were going to catch up with me when I made a break away but they didn't. It was brilliant to cross the line first and with a personal best time."

Weir was second in the 2003 and 2004 London Marathons. His 2003 time of 1:34:48 was 5 minutes faster than his personal best. In 2004, wet conditions and problems with spray from his wheels yielded a slower time of 1:42:50.

In 2005 Weir finished third, with a time of 1:36:03, in a race that saw the first seven competitors cross the line separated by 13 seconds.

In 2006 Weir won his second London Marathon, setting a course record in wet conditions with a time of 1:29:48. With this time, Weir also became the first wheelchair racer to break the 1:30 mark. Weir said after his win, "I wasn't even going to take part this morning. I've been suffering from a cold and it was 50/50 whether I would turn up or not."

In 2007 Weir won his third London Marathon. He beat Australian Paralympic champion Kurt Fearnley by 1 second in a time of 1:30:49, the second fastest time seen on the London course. Fearnley, undefeated since October 2006 in eight marathons, paid tribute to his fellow competitor.

On 13 April 2008, Weir won his third London Marathon in a row, and his fourth in total. In a time of 1:33:56, he finished 4 seconds ahead of Australian Kurt Fearnley with a sprint finish on the Mall. Weir's fourth win gave him £7,600 in prize money.

In 2009 Weir finished in second place, in a time of 1:28:57, behind Kurt Fearnley. In another sprint finish on the Mall, Fearnley edged out Weir to set a new course record of 1:28:56.

Despite getting punctures to his front and left wheels Weir still managed to finish in third place in the 2010 London Marathon in a time of 1:37:01. At one point, he led the race by 4 minutes.

In 2011 Weir won his fifth London Marathon in a time of 1:30:05. This was the tenth year in a row that Weir had finished with a podium spot.

In the run-up to the 2012 London Marathon, Weir revealed "What I'd say to the guys coming to London is that my training is going great and I don't think I've ever felt in such good shape at this point in the year. I'm averaging about 80 miles a week in the chair." In 2012 Weir won his sixth London Marathon in a time of 1:32:26. He remarked after the race "Grey-Thompson inspired me in this sport. I saw her compete in Sydney as a youngster and I went on to medal in 2008." Weir hinted that the 2012 London competition might be his last. With Weir's sixth win in the London Marathon he equalled the record of Baroness Tanni-Grey Thompson. He said afterwards: "This is my favourite win ever because the field was so strong. I was quite emotional when I crossed the line as it could be my last London Marathon for a while."

Weir competed in the 2013 London Marathon, finishing in 5th place in 1:31:31, 2 seconds behind race winner Kurt Fearnley. In the 2014 London Marathon he came a close second

Weir hasn't always seen eye to eye with the organisers of the London Marathon. In 2006, he criticised them for treating wheelchair athletes as second class citizens. He told the Sutton Guardian, "If I can help put disabled athletics on the map along the way, that is what I want to do."

In 2017 and 2018 Weir won his seventh and eighth London Marathon. He finished fifth in 2019 and third in both 2021 and 2022.

=== Great North Run ===
Weir has won eight titles at the Great North Run, a half marathon distance event in England. He broke the course record in 2005, 2009, and again in 2018. Weir's wins came in 2003 in 45:41, 2005 in 42:33, 2009 in 41:34, 2010 in 44:49, 2013 in 43:06, 2018 in 41:19 and 2022 in 42:59.

=== Other marathons and half marathons ===
In 2007 Weir won the Oensingen marathon in Switzerland in a time of 1:28.19, finishing one second in front of Swiss racer Marcel Hug.

Weir won the New York City Marathon in 2010 in a time of 1:37.29, beating Japanese rival Masazumi Soejima by 1.48 seconds.

Weir won the Lisbon Half Marathon on 25 March 2012. He set a new T53/T54 world record in a time of 43:41.

== Great Manchester run ==
Weir has won five titles at the 10,000m Great Manchester Run, a 10 kilometre race through the streets of Manchester, England. In 2004 his time was 22:30, in 2006 in a time of 21:16, in 2007 in a course record of 21:11, in 2010 in a time of 22:00, and 2011 in a time of 22:23.

== Summer Paralympics ==
=== Summer Paralympics 1996 ===
Weir's first Summer Paralympics appearance was in the 1996 Summer Paralympics in Atlanta at age 17. That year saw him finish 7th in the 100m, in a time of 15.07. He reached the semi-final in the 400m, going out of the competition with a time of 51.85. He also placed 4th in the 4X100m Relay.

Weir's first experience at the Paralympics wasn't a good one, he commented afterwards "I had been to the Games in Atlanta in 1996 as a young lad of 17 but when I got there it wasn't what I had expected. I could count about five people in the crowd at times. It disheartened me a little bit because I had missed my teenage years of growing up and being with my friends to compete at a Paralympics. I fell out of love with the sport and when I got back I just didn't want to do it any more."

=== Summer Paralympics 2004 ===
Weir won a silver medal and a bronze at the 2004 Summer Paralympics in Athens. Weir became the first Briton to win a track & field medal at the Games with his third place in the 200m final, in a time of 25.55 seconds. Weir failed to reach the 400m final but went on to collect silver in the 100m behind Finland's Leo-Pekka Tähti, in a time of 14.31 seconds.

=== Summer Paralympics 2008 ===
At the 2008 Summer Paralympics held in Beijing, China, Weir competed in 5 events, including the 1500 metres, 800 metres, 400 metres, 5000 metres and the Marathon. He went into the championship, hoping to bring home all 5 gold medals.

In the 5000 metres T54, Weir won the bronze medal behind Prawat Wahoram and Kurt Fearnley.

Weir's first Paralympic gold finally came in the 800m, a title he had been waiting twelve years for. After winning the race in a time of 1:36.61, he said, "It is the most amazing feeling. It's all I have trained for to become a Paralympic champion. I can't really put it into words now."

Weir won gold in the 800 metres T54 in a time of 1:36.61 with Kurt Fearnley winning the silver and Prawat Wahoram the bronze. Weir had to wait to see if he had won the 800m gold after the Australian team objected to Weir's starting position in the race. The race was set to be re-run when Australian competitor Kurt Fearnley asked for the protest to be withdrawn the next morning. Weir said about the protest, "I was angry and devastated, as I felt the protest was wrong. In 800m races, the first three lanes are considered the best, so Kurt actually had a better lane. But he was behind the decision to withdraw the protest, which was good sportsmanship."

Weir won his second gold in the 1500m final in a time of 3:10.34. After the race Weir said, "This one means more than winning the 800m. The 1,500m is the blue riband event in wheelchair racing."

In the 400 metres T54 he took home the silver medal, behind China’s Lixin Zhang and ahead of bronze medalist Saichon Konjen. He didn’t start the marathon.

=== Summer Paralympics 2012 ===
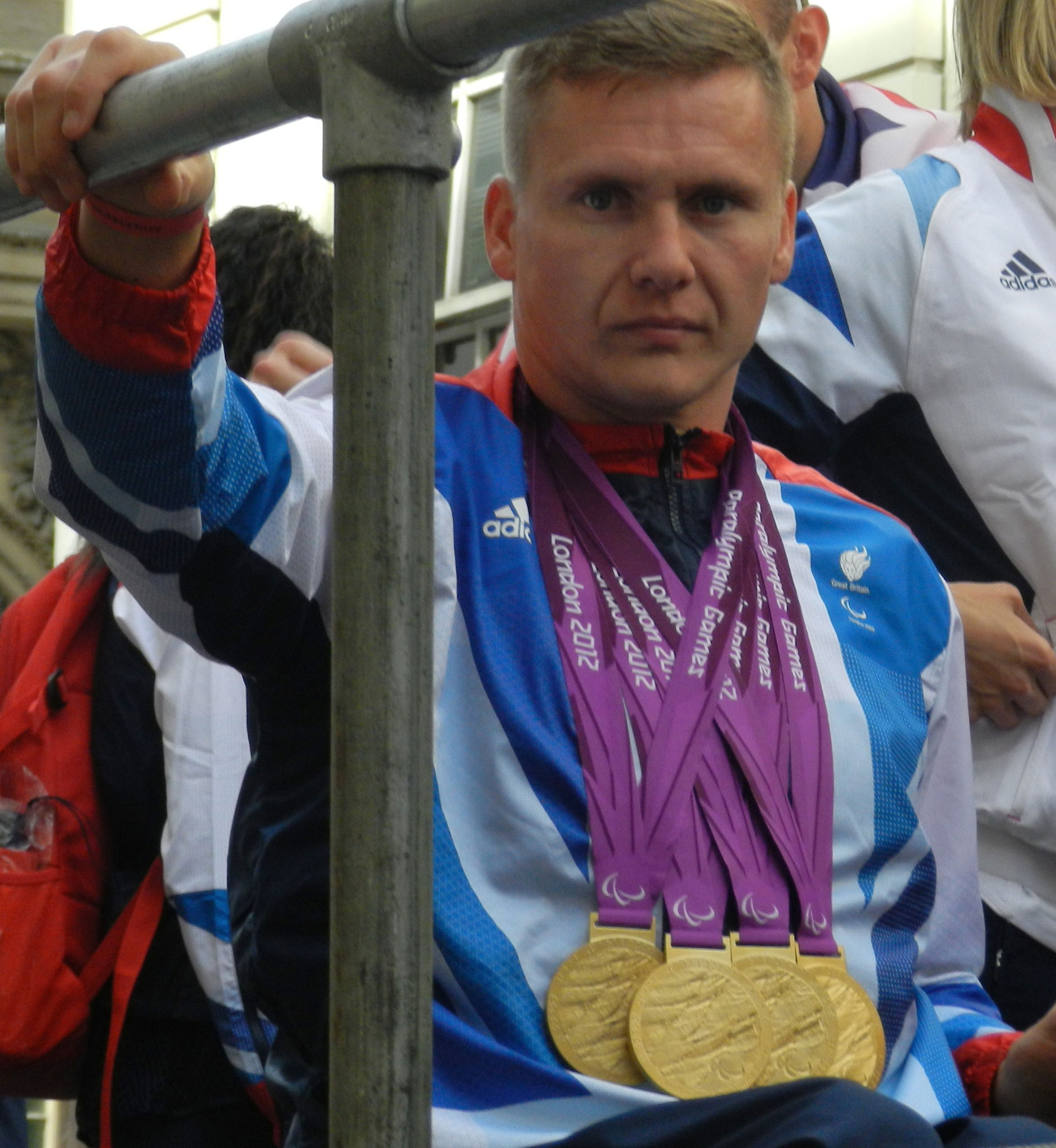
Weir at the Olympics Victory Parade wearing the four gold medals he won during the 2012 Summer Paralympics

At the London 2012 Summer Paralympics, Weir won four gold medals: three at the Olympic Stadium and one in the marathon. The 5,000 metres victory came on 2 September 2012, the 1,500m on 4 September 2012, the 800m on 6 September 2012, and the Marathon on 9 September 2012.

Weir, aged 33, opened his Paralympic campaign on 13 August 2012 with a comfortable win in his qualifying heat for the 5,000m final, slowing down in the home straight to record a time of 11:27.87.

Weir's second race of the games brought him his first gold of the competition. Weir stormed to victory in a time of 11:07.65 in the Olympic stadium.

The following day Weir raced in his third race of the games, the qualifying round for the 1,500m final. Weir finished third in a time of 3:11.35 to safely qualify for the final.

The next day, Weir defended his 2008 paralympic 1500m title in the Olympic stadium in front of 80,000 spectators. He finished his fourth race of the Games in a time of 3:12.09. Weir talked about his father, now living in Northern Ireland, who rarely gets to see him race but who was present at these Games: "He used to take me training every day when I was younger. It was nice that he could be here."

The following day, 5 September 2012, Weir raced in his fifth race of the games, the qualifying round for the 800m final. Weir won his heat in a time of 1:37.09, which was more than a second ahead of 800m world record holder Marcel Hug. Talking after the race, Hug said, "David Weir is racing very well. He is just flying. He has all the self-confidence and he has the crowd on his back so that makes him strong."

The next day, 6 September 2012, Weir triumphed once again in the 800m final, his third gold medal of the games. Once again Weir was defending a title he had won four years previously in Beijing. In front of an 80,000 crowd in the Olympic stadium, he clocked a time of 1:37.63 to claim his third track gold in five days. Weir said after the race, "They're all special. I've defended my title in both the distances I've won and now I've got a gold in the 5,000; I only got bronze in Beijing. I feel like I'm on top of the world at the moment."

Great Britain's last gold medal of the Paralympic games was won by Weir. After nine days of gruelling competition on the track, competing in and winning the 800, 1,500 and 5,000-meter titles Weir won the marathon on the final day of the games in a time of 1:30:20.

In the 2012 Summer Paralympic games, Weir took part in seven races in ten days and completed 35.3 miles in his pursuit of four gold medals for team paralympic GB.

Weir carried the Great Britain flag at the closing ceremony of the 2012 Summer Paralympics, sharing this honour with cyclist Sarah Storey.

For his performance at the Games, Weir won Best Male at the Paralympic Sport Awards.

=== Summer Paralympics 2016 ===
Weir failed to win any medals, having finished fifth in the 400m, fourth in the 1500m, sixth in the T54 800m, and did not finish the marathon due to a collision early on in the race. He retired from track racing soon afterwards, with the intention of his final race being at the following year's London Marathon.

=== Summer Paralympics 2020 ===
Weir was a late addition to the British team for the postponed 2020 Summer Paralympics in Tokyo on 21 July 2021. The other additions were Jonnie Peacock, Kadeena Cox and Libby Clegg.

=== Summer 2024 Paralympics ===
At the 2024 Summer Paralympics held in Paris, France, Weir competed in the 1500 metres, 5000 metres and marathon.

In the 1500 metres, Weir came 6th in his heat, failing to make it through to the final. In the 5000 metres, Weir came 8th. In the marathon he came 5th.

After 28 years of competing at the Paralympic Games and 7 Paralympics, Paris was his last.

== IPC Athletics World championships ==
=== IPC Athletics World Championships 2006 ===
Weir won three gold medals and a silver at the 2006 IPC Athletics World Championships in Assen, Netherlands. Weir won gold in the 100m by clocking 14.34 seconds, the 400m in a Games record of 48.06 seconds, and the 1500m. Weir won silver in the 200m, losing to local favourite Kenny van Weeghel.

=== IPC Athletics World Championships 2011 ===
Weir won three gold medals at the 2011 IPC Athletics World Championships in Christchurch, New Zealand: in the 800m, 1,500m and 5,000m.

Weir won the 800m title, and his first gold of the championships, in a photo finish with Swiss racer Marcel Hug. He scored a championship record time of 1:37.28, knocking over a 1.5 seconds off the previous best.

Weir won his second title of the championships at 1,500m in a time of 3:10.93.

Weir won his third gold in the 5,000m in a time of 10:48.43, completing his final lap in 44.12. Marcel Hug followed him over the line in second place in a time of 10:48.70.

Weir was due to enter the games marathon but withdrew on grounds of safety because the course was open to traffic. Weir said "I just thought it was ludicrous. I didn't want to risk getting injured or getting run over." Weir also told the Telegraph "The marathon was a huge disappointment but I know I made the right decision to withdraw. Questions need to be asked of the IPC and organising committee in Christchurch. I just hope big lessons have been learned as the athletes were put in a very difficult situation, putting their safety on the line."

After the championship, Weir was critical of the organisers. He told the Telegraph that he was "'delighted to come away from the World Championships with three gold medals' [in the T54 800m, 1,500m and 5,000m]. Privately, though, his view was that the organisation was poor, and officials were inconsistent. It was a view shared by other senior athletes."

== Records ==
Weir currently holds the British record at all track distances up to 5,000m, as well as on the road at 10 km, half marathon, and marathon.

== Awards and honours ==
=== Achievement awards ===
BBC London has twice recognised Weir. In 2005 Weir was named the BBC London Disabled Athlete of the year. In December 2008 Weir was given the BBC London Disabled Athlete award from a short-list of three.

A British Wheelchair Sports Award has gone to Weir two times. He received the Individual male achievement award in 2005. In November 2006, Weir shared the Individual male athlete award with tennis player Peter Norfolk.

2006 was a year of further award nominations for Weir, the year he took four medals in the IPC Athletics World Championships and won his second London Marathon. The Sports Journalists' Association named him as disabled sports personality of the year. In October 2006 Weir was given the Best Performance Award by the British Athletic Writers Association for his performances in Assen at the IPC World Championships. In 2006 Weir was also nominated for BBC Sports Personality of the Year, only the second disabled athlete to be nominated, but was controversially omitted from the eventual short-list for the honour. British Paralympic Association chairman Mike Brace said after Weir's omission, "For none of our top disabled athletes to be recognised in the shortlist is disappointing. I think this shows how far disability sport has got to go to be accepted by the general public."

As an adult, Weir continues his affiliation with the Balfour Beatty London Youth Games. In 2010 he was inducted into the London Youth Games Hall of Fame. He became one of the patrons for the 2012 event alongside weightlifter Zoe Smith. The duo took part in an Olympic v Paralympic competition filmed for the London Youth Games' website, going head-to-head in archery, basketball, boccia and table tennis.

Weir was nominated for the 2012 Laureus World Sportsperson with a Disability of the Year Award for his athletic achievements in 2011, although he lost out to runner Oscar Pistorius.

=== Order of the British Empire ===
Weir was appointed Member of the Order of the British Empire (MBE) in the 2009 New Year Honours, he received the honour for his services to disabled sport.

Weir was appointed Commander of the Order of the British Empire (CBE) in the 2013 New Year Honours for services to athletics.

=== Other honours ===
Weir was made an honorary freeman of Sutton in 2009, the first person to be awarded the honour for 30 years. Weir said, "It's a great honour to be given the Freedom of the Borough of Sutton and I feel really privileged. The council actually helped me get started in the sport as the Mayor gave me a grant for about £800 when I was eight years old to buy my first racing wheelchair."

On 20 November 2009, Weir officially opened the new extension building in Devonshire Primary School, Sutton.

=== Public acclaim ===
Weir has been praised by various news sources and commentators. In the run-up to the Summer Paralympics in 2008, Canadian Broadcasting Corporation called him "one of the best wheelchair athletes in the world" and the British Broadcasting Corporation hailed him as "Britain's top wheelchair racer."

The 2012 Paralympics Games brought further acclaim from the media. The London Evening Standard reported that "Paralympics superstar David Weir today became the greatest wheelchair racer of all time after winning the marathon – and his fourth gold in a stunning Games." The Guardian wrote, "David Weir is simply unstoppable. A performance of iron-clad confidence and control brought him an extraordinary third gold medal of the Games on Thursday night, cementing his position as the world's leading wheelchair athlete and leaving his rivals shattered."

Weir's performance in the 2012 London games brought plaudits from his peers. Canadian paralympic wheelchair racer Chantal Petitclerc applauded his achievements, with a humorous caveat: "This puts David clearly as the best wheelchair athlete ever. Er, male!" One of Weir's fiercest competitors, Swiss racer Marcel Hug, said "He is beatable. But he is the best." Another Swiss wheelchair racer, Heinz Frei, said, "David, you are the big hero of London. Nobody can beat you. I tip my hat."

Weir has also been named as a role model by other professional athletes. Sprinter Usain Bolt has called him "simply inspiring." After winning a gold medal for the T53 100m race in the London 2012 Summer Paralympics, Mickey Bushell said of Weir, "He's been a massive influence – just as a team-mate, he's been there for me. He's a fantastic guy, a great role model to look up to."

== See also ==
- 2012 Summer Olympics and Paralympics gold post boxes
