= Masazumi Soejima =

Japanese Paralympic athlete

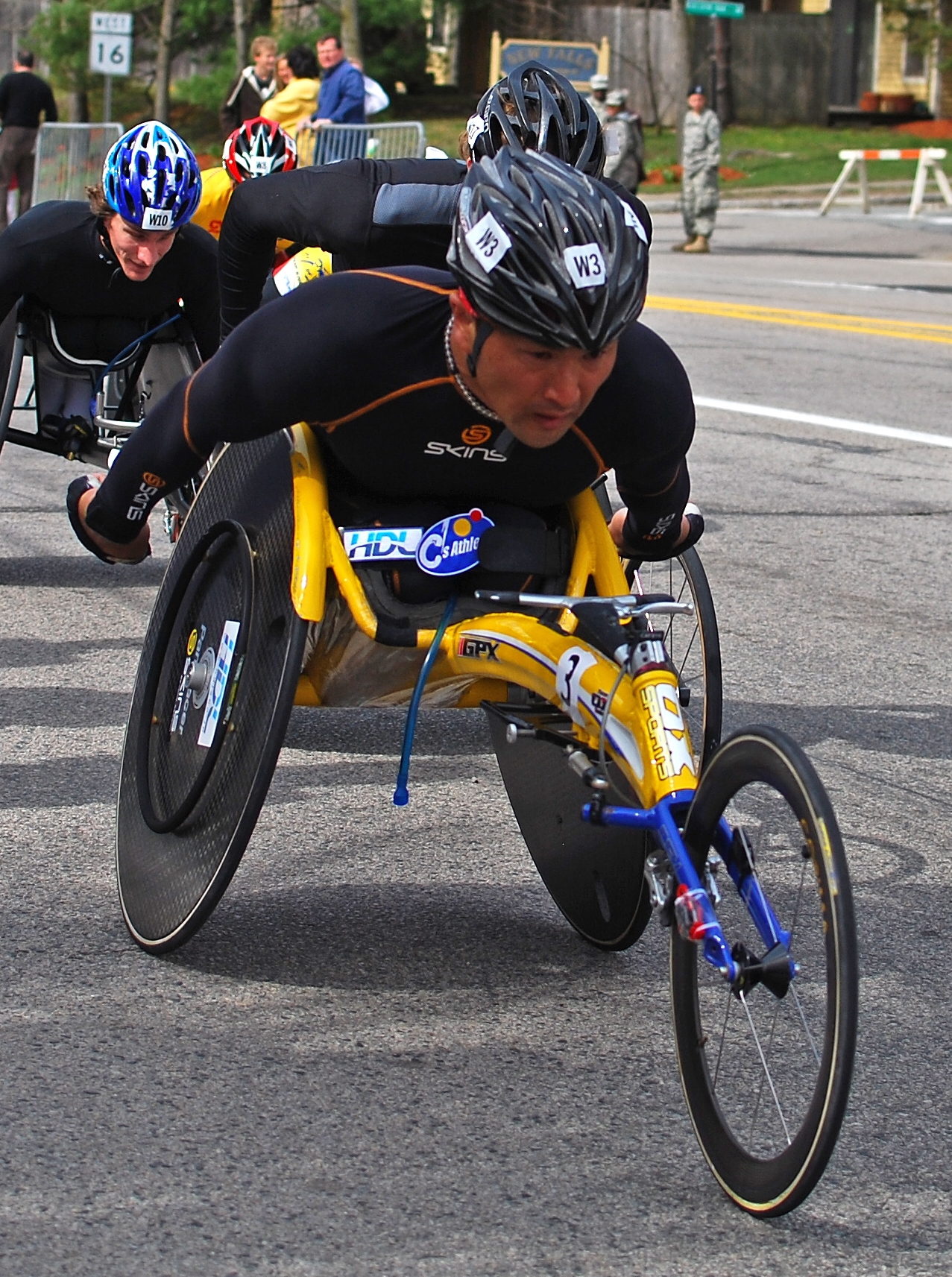
- Soejima during the 2009 Boston Marathon

Medal record

Track and field (athletics)

Representing Japan

Paralympic Games
Bronze medal – third place	2004 Athens	4x400m – T53-54

Masazumi Soejima (副島 正純, Soejima Masazumi) (born 1970) is a Paralympian wheelchair racing athlete from Japan competing mainly in category T54 long-distance events.

Masazumi was the men's wheelchair winner of the 2011 New York Marathon and the 2011 Boston Marathon. He has competed in the marathon in both the 2004 and 2008 Summer Paralympics, 10000m in 2004, 5000m and 1500m in 2008 but it was as part of the Japanese 4 × 400 m relay in 2004 that he won his only medal, a bronze.

He later moved into administration of wheelchair racing, serving as the race director of the wheelchair section of the 2019 Tokyo Marathon.
