= Franz Nietlispach =

Swiss wheelchair athlete and politician

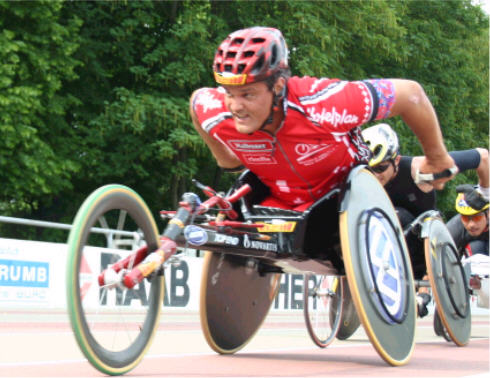
Franz Nietlispach in Mannheim

Franz Nietlispach (born 2 April 1958) is a Swiss wheelchair athlete, handcyclist, and a politician.

He has competed in every Summer Paralympic Games from 1976 to 2008, winning an incredible total of fourteen gold, six silver, and two bronze medals. All of these medals were for athletics, except for one bronze earned in hand-cycling at the 2004 Games. At the 2008 Beijing Games, Nietlispach competed only in cycling; this was the first time he appeared at the Paralympics without participating in an athletics event. He also competed in table tennis early in his career, taking part in that sport at the 1976 and 1980 Paralympics.

He has, impressively, won the men's wheelchair division of the Boston Marathon five times. He has also held political office in Aargau.

In 2006, Franz Nietlispach began a project in which he got together with Jaroslaw Baranowsky from Poland, to create a lighter, more aero-dynamic hand-cycle. He tested prototypes at races, and experimented with using carbon. They ended up selling around 60-80 carbon hand-cycles per year - however, he does not do that anymore, focussing on his racing and the Paralympics.

== See also ==
- Athletes with most gold medals in one sport at the Paralympic Games
