= Alhassane Baldé =

German Paralympic athlete

Personal information
- Born: 21 December 1985 (age 40) Conakry, Guinea
- Home town: Bonn, Germany
- Height: 1.60 m (5 ft 3 in)

Sport
- Country: Germany
- Sport: Paralympic athletics
- Disability: Paraplegia
- Disability class: T54
- Event(s): 800 metres 1500 metres 5000 metres Marathon
- Club: SSF Bonn
- Coached by: Alois Gmeiner
Medal record
Paralympic athletics
Representing Germany
World Championships
Bronze medal – third place	2017 London	Men's 1500m T54
Bronze medal – third place	2017 London	Men's 5000m T54
European Championships
Silver medal – second place	2014 Swansea	Men's 1500m T54
Silver medal – second place	2014 Swansea	Men's 5000m T54
Silver medal – second place	2018 Berlin	Men's 5000m T54
Bronze medal – third place	2005 Espoo	Men's 800m T54
Bronze medal – third place	2016 Grosseto	Men's 1500m T54
Bronze medal – third place	2016 Grosseto	Men's 5000m T54

Alhassane Baldé (born 21 December 1985) is a Guinean-born German Paralympic athlete who competes in long-distance running events in international level events.

Baldé was the second of twins. His disability was caused by a medical error at birth: he was pulled out of the womb in breech position resulting in an injured spine. He and his twin brother were adopted by his aunt and uncle moved to Düsseldorf aged nine months to receive medical treatment.
