= Rawat Tana =

Thai wheelchair racer

Personal information
- Born: 5 May 1977 (age 49)

Sport
- Sport: Paralympic athletics
Medal record
Paralympic athletics
Representing Thailand
Paralympic Games
Gold medal – first place	2004 Beijing	4 x 100m T53-54
Gold medal – first place	2004 Athens	4 x 400m T53-54
Silver medal – second place	2016 Rio de Janeiro	4x400 m T53-T54
Bronze medal – third place	2004 Athens	10000m T54
World Championships
Gold medal – first place	2015 Doha	1500 m T54
Gold medal – first place	2015 Doha	5000 m T54
Silver medal – second place	2013 Lyon	1500 m T54
Silver medal – second place	2013 Lyon	4x400 m T53/54
Silver medal – second place	2015 Doha	4x400 m relay T53-54
Asian Para Games
Gold medal – first place	2014 Incheon	5000m T54
Bronze medal – third place	2018 Jakarta	1500m T54
ASEAN Para Games
Silver medal – second place	2015 Singapore	1500 m T53-54

Rawat Tana (born 5 May 1977) is a wheelchair racer from Thailand who is a gold medalist at both the Summer Paralympic and World Championships.

At the 2004 Olympic Games, he finished 3rd in the demonstration sport of Men's 1500m wheelchair. In same event at the 2004 Summer Paralympics, he did not qualify for the final, after getting into a collision with Robert Figl in the semifinals. He did, however, win a bronze in the 10,000 metres, a gold in the 4×100 metre relay, and another gold in the 4×400 metre relay at those same Paralympic games.
