= Volleyball at the 2012 Summer Paralympics – Women's team rosters =

This article shows the rosters of all participating teams at the women's volleyball tournament at the 2012 Summer Paralympics in London.

== Pool A ==
=== Japan ===
The following is the Japanese roster in the women's volleyball tournament of the 2012 Summer Paralympics.

№	Name	Date of birth	Position	2012 club
1	Michiyo Nichiie	12 March 1967		(Japan) Soul
2	Sachie Awano	13 September 1988		(Japan) Hyogo LSC
3	Yukari Okahira	9 March 1968		(Japan) Hyogo LSC
4	Junko Fujii	3 April 1966		(Japan) Saitama Red Beads Venus
5	Yoko Saito	21 September 1972		(Japan) Tokyo Planets Megumi
6	Shiori Ogata	5 November 1985		(Japan) Tokyo Planets Megumi
7	Emi Kaneki	6 March 1982		(Japan) Kobe Jets
8	Noriko Kaneda	21 February 1964		(Japan) Tochigi Thunders
9	Satoko Kikuchi	28 April 1980		(Japan) Hyogo LSC
10	Mamiko Osada	23 July 1967		(Japan) Tokyo Planets Megumi
11	Harumi Sakamoto	15 June 1967		(Japan) Tokyo Planets Megumi

=== Great Britain ===
The following is the British roster in the women's volleyball tournament of the 2012 Summer Paralympics.

№	Name	Date of birth	Position	2012 club
1	Julie Rogers	2 November 1998		(United Kingdom) Loughborough Lions
2	Victoria Widdup	18 April 1987		(United Kingdom) London Lynx
3	Jessica Frezza	21 September 1993		(United Kingdom) Loughborough Lions
4	Samantha Bowen	21 March 1986		(United Kingdom) FDSW Celtic Dragons
5	Andrea Green	29 May 1970		(United Kingdom) Loughborough Lions
6	Emma Wiggs	14 June 1980		(United Kingdom) Portsmouth
7	Martine Wright	30 September 1972		(United Kingdom) London Lynx
8	Amy Brierly	30 September 1989		(United Kingdom) FDSW Celtic Dragons
9	Nicole Hill	4 September 1980		(United Kingdom) Portsmouth
10	Jessica O'Brien	16 May 1992		(United Kingdom) FDSW Celtic Dragons
11	Claire Harvey	19 February 1974		(United Kingdom) London Lynx

=== Netherlands ===
The following is the Dutch roster in the women's volleyball tournament of the 2012 Summer Paralympics.

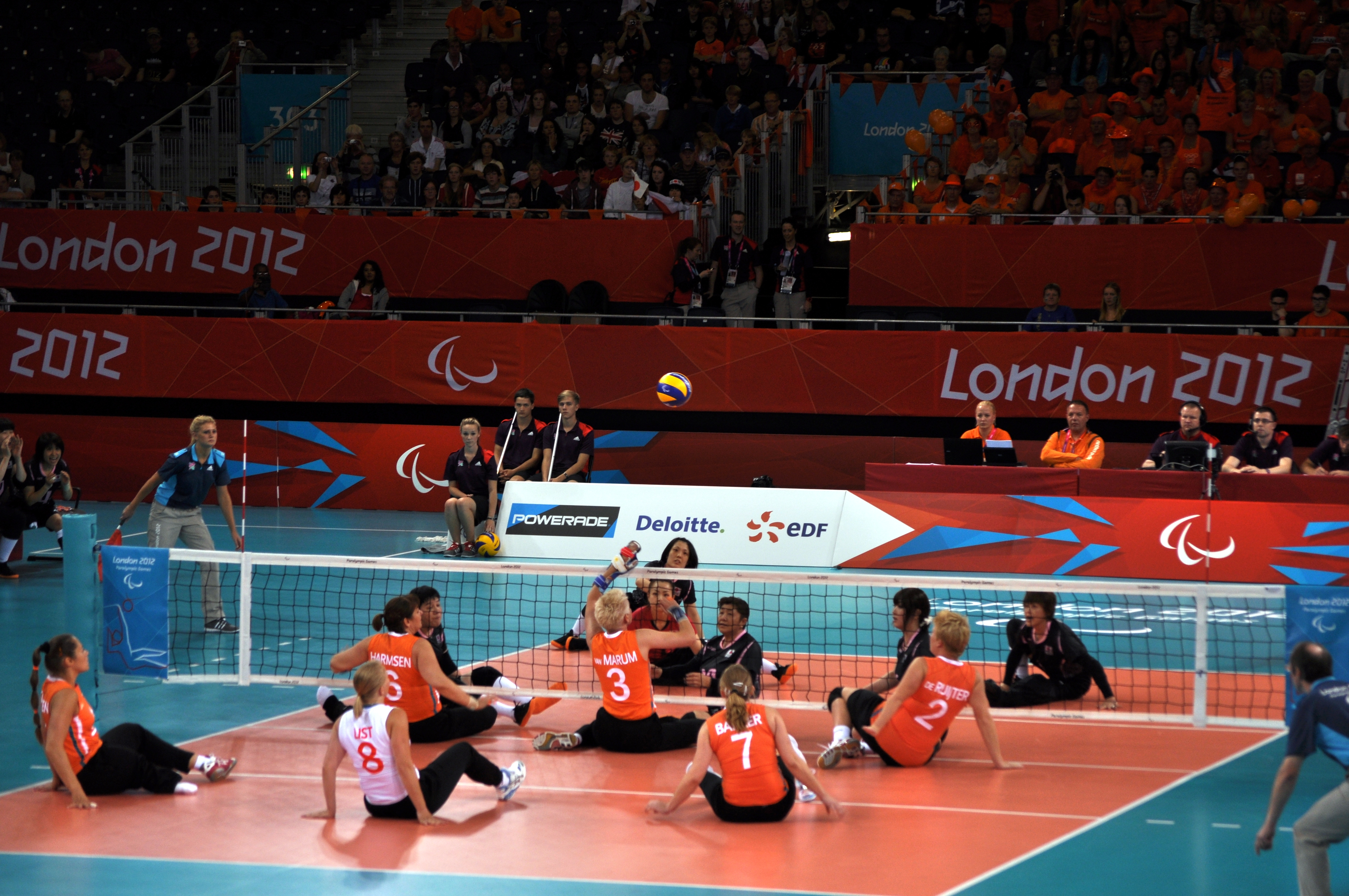
Dutch women's volleyball team

№	Name	Date of birth	Position	2012 club
1	Elvira Stinissen	26 March 1979		(Netherlands) Netwerk
2	Marieke de Ruijter	27 November 1988		(Netherlands) Netwerk
3	Djoke van Marum	22 September 1959		(Netherlands) Volleer
4	Rika de Vries	29 December 1974		(Netherlands) Kindercentrum/Alterno
5	Karin van der Haar	9 May 1977		(Netherlands) Sudosa/SC Bartje
6	Karin Harmsen	11 March 1962		(Netherlands) Volleer
7	Sanne Bakker	13 February 1992		(Netherlands) Surrey
8	Paula List	16 August 1972		(Netherlands) Allvo
9	Jolanda Slenter	15 June 1965		(Netherlands) Holyoke
12	Josien Ten Thije	24 December 1969		(Netherlands) Sudosa/SC Bartje
15	Anne Raben	17 May 1986		(Netherlands) Kindercentrum/Alterno

=== Ukraine ===
The following is the Ukrainian roster in the women's volleyball tournament of the 2012 Summer Paralympics.

№	Name	Date of birth	Position	2012 club
1	Margaryta Pryvalykhina	9 March 1980		
2	Anzhelika Churkina	18 September 1969		
3	Larysa Sinchuk	9 August 1965		
4	Galyna Kuznetsova	22 January 1960		
5	Olena Manankova	18 May 1995		
6	Ilona Yudina	28 June 1984		
7	Larysa Klochkova	15 April 1970		
9	Inna Osetynska	1 January 1967		
10	Olga Shatylo	12 August 1984		
11	Larysa Ponomarenko	28 April 1977		
12	Valentyna Brik	31 August 1985		

== Pool B ==
=== Brazil ===
The following is the Brazilian roster in the women's volleyball tournament of the 2012 Summer Paralympics.

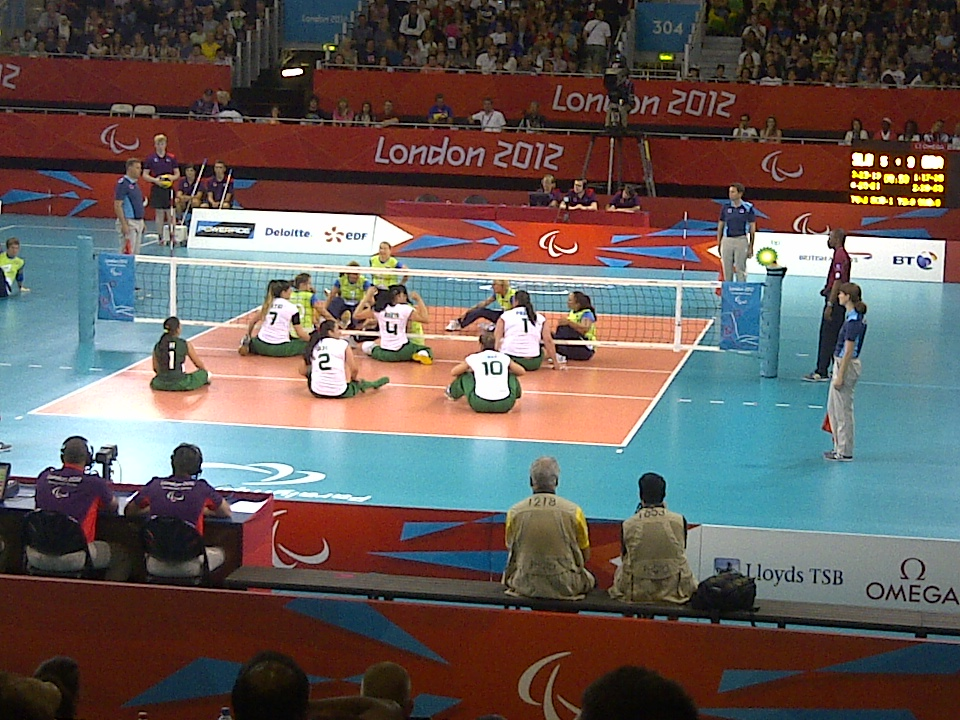
Brazil women's paralympic volleyball team

№	Name	Date of birth	Position	2012 club
1	Paula Herts	21 July 1974		(Brazil) Add
2	Aderlandi Silva	4 July 1976		(Brazil) Sesi
3	Gilvania Lima	28 November 1977		(Brazil) Sesi
4	Adria Silva	1 June 1983		(Brazil) Adap
5	Graciana Alves	16 May 1965		(Brazil) Adap
6	Ana Paula Alves	17 November 1970		(Brazil) Sesi
7	Nathalie Silva	13 April 1990		(Brazil) Sesi
9	Jani Batista	13 August 1986		(Brazil) Adfego
10	Janaina Cunha	16 July 1977		(Brazil) Sesi
11	Gabrielle Marchi	12 March 1991		(Brazil) Adfego
12	Suellen Lima	4 November 1989		(Brazil) Sesi

=== China ===
The following is the Chinese roster in the women's volleyball tournament of the 2012 Summer Paralympics.

№	Name	Date of birth	Position	2012 club
1	Tang Xue Mei	4 February 1994		(China) Shanghai
2	Lu Hong Qin	4 October 1980		(China) Shanghai
3	Tan Yanhua	10 October 1987		(China) Jiangsu
5	Su Li Mei	16 October 1988		(China) Yunnan
6	Zheng Xiong Ying	1 May 1975		(China) Zhejiang
7	Wang Yanan	8 September 1991		(China) Shanghai
8	Li Liping	3 July 1982		(China) Shanghai
9	Zhang Xu Fei	28 August 1984		(China) Shanghai
10	Yang Yan Ling	2 November 1980		(China) Gansu
11	Zhang Lijun	31 August 1985		(China) Liaoning
12	Zheng Yu Hong	21 March 1971		(China) Jiangsu

=== Slovenia ===
The following is the Slovenian roster in the women's volleyball tournament of the 2012 Summer Paralympics.

№	Name	Date of birth	Position	2012 club
1	Anita Goltnik Urnaut	26 November 1964		(Slovenia) ISD Samorastnik
4	Bogomira Jakin	22 October 1957		(Slovenia) ISD Nova Gorica
5	Marinka Cencelj	22 January 1964		(Slovenia) ISD Invalid
6	Suzana Ocepek	24 November 1985		(Slovenia) ISD Nova Gorica
7	Alenka Iršič	31 May 1968		(Slovenia) ISD Samorastnik
8	Danica Goznak	14 February 1962		(Slovenia) ISD Samorastnik
9	Štefka Tomič	12 December 1961		(Slovenia) ISD Samorastnik
10	Saša Kotnik	16 September 1980		(Slovenia) ISD Samorastnik
11	Lena Gabršček	12 June 1994		(Slovenia) ISD Samorastnik
13	Regina Terbuc Roudi	13 June 1974		(Slovenia) ISD Samorastnik
16	Jasmina Zbil	20 December 1980		(Slovenia) ISD Nova Gorica

=== United States ===
The following is the American roster in the women's volleyball tournament of the 2012 Summer Paralympics.

№	Name	Date of birth	Position	2012 club
1	Lora Webster	26 August 1986		
3	Brenda Maymon	4 June 1985		
4	Michelle Gerlosky	20 March 1983		
5	Kathryn Holloway	8 June 1986		
6	Heather Erickson	9 May 1993		
7	Monique Burkland	11 August 1989		
10	Kari Miller	16 April 1977		
11	Allison Aldrich	19 January 1988		
13	Nichole Millage	27 March 1977		
14	Kaleo Kanahele	11 June 1996		
15	Kendra Lancaster	2 July 1987		

== See also ==
- Volleyball at the 2012 Summer Paralympics – Men's team rosters
