= List of 2012 Summer Paralympics medal winners =

The 2012 Summer Paralympics, the fourteenth Summer Paralympic Games, and also more generally known as the London 2012 Paralympic Games, was a major international multi-sport event for the disabled governed by the International Paralympic Committee, that took place in London, United Kingdom from 29 August to 9 September.

There was competition in 503 events in 26 sports, and there were a total of 1522 medals awarded.

== Archery ==
=== Men's events ===
Event	Class	Gold	Silver	Bronze
Individual compound	Open	Jere Forsberg; Finland	Matt Stutzman; United States	Dogan Hanci; Turkey
Individual compound	W1	Jeff Fabry; United States	David Drahonínský; Czech Republic	Norbert Murphy; Canada
Individual recurve	Standing	Timur Tuchinov; Russia	Oleg Shestakov; Russia	Mikhail Oyun; Russia
Individual recurve	W1/W2	Oscar de Pellegrin; Italy	Hasihin Sanawi; Malaysia	Lung Hui Tseng; Chinese Taipei
Team recurve	Open	Russia (RUS); Mikhail Oyun; Oleg Shestakov; Timur Tuchinov	South Korea (KOR); Jung Young Joo; Kim Suk Ho; Lee Myeong-Gu	China (CHN); Cheng Changjie; Dong Zhi; Li Zongshan

=== Women's events ===
Event	Class	Gold	Silver	Bronze
Individual compound	Open	Danielle Brown; Great Britain	Mel Clarke; Great Britain	Stepanida Artakhinova; Russia
Individual recurve	Standing	Huilian Yan; China	Hwa Sook Lee; South Korea	Milena Olszewska; Poland
Individual recurve	W1/W2	Zahra Nemati; Iran	Elisabetta Mijno; Italy	Jinzhi Li; China
Team recurve	Open	South Korea (KOR); Kim Ran Sook; Ko Hee Sook; Lee Hwa Sook	China (CHN); Gao Fangxia; Xiao Yanhong; Yan Huilian	Iran (IRI); Zahra Javanmard; Zahra Nemati; Razieh Shir Mohammadi

== Athletics ==
=== Men's events ===
Event	Classification	Gold	Silver	Bronze
100 m	T11	Xue Lei; Wang Lin (Guide); China	Lucas Prado; Justino Barbosa dos Santos (Guide); Brazil	Felipe Gomes; Leonardo Souza Lopes (Guide); Brazil
100 m	T12	Fedor Trikolich; Russia	Mateusz Michalski; Poland	Li Yansong; China
100 m	T13	Jason Smyth; Ireland	Luis Felipe Gutierrez; Cuba	Jonathan Ntutu; Brazil
200 m	T11	Felipe Gomes; Leonardo Souza Lopes (Guide); Brazil	Daniel Silva; Heitor de Oliveira Sales (Guide); Brazil	Jose Sayovo Armando; Nicolau Palanca (Guide); Angola
200 m	T12	Mateusz Michalski; Poland	Fedor Trikolich; Russia	Li Yansong; China
200 m	T13	Jason Smyth; Ireland	Alexey Labzin; Russia	Artem Loginov; Russia
400 m	T11	Jose Sayovo Armando; Nicolau Palanca (Guide); Angola	Lucas Prado; Laercio Alves Martins (Guide); Brazil	Gauthier Tresor Makunda; Antoine Laneyrie (Guide); France
400 m	T12	Mahmoud Khaldi; Tunisia	Hilton Langenhoven; South Africa	Jorge B. Gonzalez Sauceda; Mexico
400 m	T13	Alexey Labzin; Russia	Alexander Zverev; Russia	Mohamed Amguoun; Morocco
800 m	T12	Abderrahim Zhiou; Tunisia	Egor Sharov; Russia	David Devine; Great Britain
800 m	T13	Abdellatif Baka; Algeria	David Korir; Kenya	Abdelillah Mame; Morocco
1500 m	T11	Samwel Mushai Kimani; James Boit (Guide); Kenya	Odair Santos; Carlos Antonio dos Santos (Guide); Brazil	Jason Joseph Dunkerley; Josh Karanja (Guide); Canada
1500 m	T13	Abderrahim Zhiou; Tunisia	David Korir; Kenya	David Devine; Great Britain
5000 m	T11	Cristian Valenzuela; Cristopher Guajardo (Guide); Chile	Jason Joseph Dunkerley; Josh Karanja (Guide); Canada	Shinya Wada; Japan
5000 m	T12	El Amin Chentouf; Morocco	Abderrahim Zhiou; Tunisia	Henry Kirwa; Kenya
Marathon	T12	Alberto Suárez Laso; Spain	Elkin Alonso Serna Moreno; German Naranjo Jaramillo (Guide); Colombia	Abderrahim Zhiou; Tunisia
Long jump	F11	Ruslan Katyshev; Ukraine	Elexis Gillette; United States	Li Duan; China
Long jump	F13	Luis Felipe Gutierrez; Cuba	Angel Jimenez Cabeza; Cuba	Radoslav Zlatanov; Bulgaria
Triple jump	F11	Denis Gulin; Russia	Li Duan; China	Ruslan Katyshev; Ukraine
Triple jump	F12	Oleg Panyutin; Azerbaijan	Vladimir Zayets; Azerbaijan	Dong Hewei; China
Shot put	F11/12	Andrii Holivets; Ukraine	Vladimir Andryushchenko; Russia	Russell Short; Australia
Discus throw	F11	David Casino; Spain	Vasyl Lishchynskyi; Ukraine	Bil Marinkovic; Austria
Javelin throw	F12/13	Zhu Pengkai; China	Sajad Nikparast; Iran	Branimir Budetic; Croatia

==== Women's events ====
Event	Classification	Gold	Silver	Bronze
100 m	T11	Terezinha Guilhermina; Guilherme Soares de Santana (Guide); Brazil	Jerusa Geber Santos; Luiz Henrique Barboza Da Silva (Guide); Brazil	Jhulia Santos; Fabio Dias de Oliveira Silva (Guide); Brazil
100 m	T12	Zhou Guohua; Li Jie (Guide); China	Libby Clegg; Mikail Huggins (Guide); Great Britain	Oxana Boturchuk; Ukraine
100 m	T13	Omara Durand; Cuba	Ilse Hayes; South Africa	Nantenin Keita; France
200 m	T11	Terezinha Guilhermina; Guilherme Soares de Santana (Guide); Brazil	Jerusa Geber Santos; Luiz Henrique Barboza Da Silva (Guide); Brazil	Jia Juntingxian; Xu Donglin (Guide); China
200 m	T12	Assia El Hannouni; Gautier Simounet (Guide); France	Zhou Guohua; Li Jie (Guide); China	Zhu Daqing; Zhang Hui (Guide); China
400 m	T12	Assia El Hannouni; France	Oxana Boturchuk; Ukraine	Daniela Velasco; Jose Guadalupe Fuentes Ortiz (Guide); Mexico
400 m	T13	Omara Durand; Cuba	Somaya Bousaid; Tunisia	Alexandra Dimoglou; Greece
1500 m	T12	Elena Pautova; Russia	Elena Congost; Spain	Annalisa Minetti; Andrea Giocondi (Guide); Italy
Long jump	F11/12	Oksana Zubkovska; Ukraine	Jia Juntingxian; China	Anna Kaniuk; Belarus
Long jump	F13	Ilse Hayes; South Africa	Lynda Hamri; Algeria	Anthi Karagianni; Greece
Shot put	F11/12	Assunta Legnante; Italy	Tang Hongxia; China	Zhang Liangmin; China
Discus throw	F11/12	Zhang Liangmin; China	Tang Hongxia; China	Claire Williams; Great Britain
Javelin throw	F12/13	Tanja Dragic; Serbia	Anna Sorokina; Russia	Natalija Eder; Austria

=== T/F20 ===
==== Men's events ====
Event	Classification	Gold	Silver	Bronze
1500 m	T20	Peyman Nasiri Bazanjani; Iran	Daniel Pek; Poland	Rafal Korc; Poland
Long jump	F20	Jose Antonio Exposito Pineiro; Spain	Zoran Talic; Croatia	Lenine Cunha; Portugal
Shot put	F20	Todd Hodgetts; Australia	Jeffrey Ige; Sweden	Muhammad Ziyad Zolkefli; Malaysia

==== Women's events ====
Event	Classification	Gold	Silver	Bronze
1500 m	T20	Barbara Niewiedzial (Guide); Poland	Arleta Meloch (Guide); Poland	Ilona Biacsi (Guide); Hungary
Long jump	F20	Karolina Kucharczyk; Poland	Krestina Zhukova; Russia	Mikela Ristoski; Croatia
Shot put	F20	Ewa Durska; Poland	Anastasiia Mysnyk; Ukraine	Svitlana Kudelya; Ukraine

=== T/F31–38 ===
==== Men's events ====
Event	Classification	Gold	Silver	Bronze
100 m	T34	Walid Ktila; Tunisia	Rheed McCracken; Australia	Mohamed Hammadi; United Arab Emirates
100 m	T35	Iurii Tsaruk; Ukraine	Teboho Mokgalagadi; South Africa	Fu Xinhan; China
100 m	T36	Evgenii Shvetcov; Russia	Graeme Ballard; Great Britain	Roman Pavlyk; Ukraine
100 m	T37	Fanie van der Merwe; South Africa	Liang Yongbin; China	Roman Kapranov; Russia
100 m	T38	Evan O'Hanlon; Australia	Dyan Buis; South Africa	Zhou Wenjun; China
200 m	T34	Walid Ktila; Tunisia	Mohamed Hammadi; United Arab Emirates	Rheed McCracken; Australia
200 m	T35	Iurii Tsaruk; Ukraine	Fu Xinhan; China	Hernan Barreto; Argentina
200 m	T36	Roman Pavlyk; Ukraine	So Wa Wai; Hong Kong	Ben Rushgrove; Great Britain
200 m	T37	Roman Kapranov; Russia	Shang Guangxu; China	Omar Monterola; Venezuela
200 m	T38	Evan O'Hanlon; Australia	Dyan Buis; South Africa	Zhou Wenjun; China
400 m	T36	Evgenii Shvetcov; Russia	Paul Blake; Great Britain	Roman Pavlyk; Ukraine
400 m	T38	Mohamed Farhat Chida; Tunisia	Zhou Wenjun; China	Union Sekailwe; South Africa
800 m	T36	Evgenii Shvetcov; Russia	Artem Arefyev; Russia	Paul Blake; Great Britain
800 m	T37	Michael McKillop; Ireland	Mohamed Charmi; Tunisia	Brad Scott; Australia
1500 m	T37	Michael McKillop; Ireland	Brad Scott; Australia	Mohamed Charmi; Tunisia
Long jump	F36	Roman Pavlyk; Ukraine	Mariusz Sobczak; Poland	Vladimir Sviridov; Russia
Long jump	F37/38	Gocha Khugaev; Russia	Ma Yuxi; China	Dyan Buis; South Africa
Shot put	F32/33	Kamel Kardjena; Algeria	Karim Betina; Algeria	Mounir Bakiri; Algeria
Shot put	F34	Azeddine Nouiri; Morocco	Mohsen Kaedi; Iran	Thierry Cibone; France
Shot put	F37/38	Xia Dong; China	Ibrahim Ahmed Abdelwareth; Egypt	Javad Hardani; Iran
Club throw	F31/32/51	Zeljko Dimitrijevic (*); Serbia	Radim Beles (*); Czech Republic	Lahouari Bahlaz; Algeria
Discus throw	F32/33/34	Wang Yanzhang; China	Hani Alnakhli; Saudi Arabia	Lahouari Bahlaz; Algeria
Discus throw	F35/36	Sebastian Dietz; Germany	Oleksii Pashkov; Ukraine	Wang Wenbo; China
Discus throw	F37/38	Javad Hardani; Iran	Xia Dong; China	Tomasz Blatkiewicz; Poland
Javelin throw	F33/34	Mohsen Kaedi; Iran	Wang Yanzhang; China	Kamel Kardjena; Algeria

(*) F51 competitor

==== Women's events ====
Event	Classification	Gold	Silver	Bronze
100 m	T34	Hannah Cockroft; Great Britain	Amy Siemons; Netherlands	Rosemary Little; Australia
100 m	T35	Liu Ping; China	Oxana Corso; Italy	Virginia McLachlan; Canada
100 m	T36	Elena Ivanova; Russia	Jeon Min-Jae; South Korea	Claudia Nicoleitzik; Germany
100 m	T37	Mandy Francois-Elie; France	Johanna Benson; Namibia	Neda Bahi; Tunisia
100 m	T38	Margarita Goncharova; Russia	Chen Junfei; China	Inna Stryzhak; Ukraine
200 m	T34	Hannah Cockroft; Great Britain	Amy Siemons; Netherlands	Desiree Vranken; Netherlands
200 m	T35	Liu Ping; China	Oxana Corso; Italy	Virginia McLachlan; Canada
200 m	T36	Elena Ivanova; Russia	Jeon Min-Jae; South Korea	Claudia Nicoleitzik; Germany
200 m	T37	Johanna Benson; Namibia	Bethany Woodward; Great Britain	Maria Seifert; Germany
200 m	T38	Chen Junfei; China	Margarita Goncharova; Russia	Inna Stryzhak; Ukraine
400 m	T37	Neda Bahi; Tunisia	Viktoriya Kravchenko; Ukraine	Evgeniya Trushnikova; Russia
4 × 100 m relay	T35/T38	Russia (RUS); Anastasiya Ovsyannikova; Svetlana Sergeeva; Elena Ivanova; Margarita Goncharova	China (CHN); Xiong Dezhi; Cao Yuanhang; Liu Ping; Chen Junfei	Great Britain (GBR); Olivia Breen; Bethany Woodward; Katrina Hart; Jenny McLoughlin
Long jump	F37/38	Margarita Goncharova; Russia	Inna Stryzhak; Ukraine	Cao Yuanhang; China
Shot put	F35/36	Mariia Pomazan; Ukraine	Wang Jun; China	Wu Qing; China
Shot put	F37	Mi Na; China	Xu Qiuping; China	Eva Berna; Czech Republic
Club throw	F31/32/51	Maroua Ibrahmi; Tunisia	Mounia Gasmi; Algeria	Gemma Prescott; Great Britain
Discus throw	F35/36	Wu Qing; China	Mariia Pomazan; Ukraine	Kath Proudfoot; Australia
Discus throw	F37	Mi Na; China	Xu Qiuping; China	Beverley Jones; Great Britain
Javelin throw	F33/34/52/53	Birgit Kober; Germany	Marie Brämer-Skowronek; Germany	Marjaana Huovinen; Finland
Javelin throw	F37/38	Shirlene Coelho; Brazil	Jia Qianqian; China	Georgia Beikoff; Australia

=== F40 ===
Event	Gold	Silver	Bronze
Shot put	Wang Zhiming; China	Hocine Gherzouli; Algeria	Paschalis Stathelakos; Greece
Discus throw	Wang Zhiming; China	Paschalis Stathelakos; Greece	Jonathan De Souza Santos; Brazil
Javelin throw	Wang Zhiming; China	Ahmed Naas; Iraq	Wildan Nukhailawi; Iraq

=== Women's events ===
Event	Gold	Silver	Bronze
Shot put	Raoua Tlili; Tunisia	Meng Genjimisu; China	Najat El Garaa; Morocco
Discus throw	Najat El Garaa; Morocco	Raoua Tlili; Tunisia	Meng Genjimisu; China

=== T/F42–46 ===
==== Men's events ====
Event	Classification	Gold	Silver	Bronze
100 m	T42	Heinrich Popow; Germany	Scott Reardon; Australia	Wojtek Czyz; Germany
100 m	T44	Jonnie Peacock; Great Britain	Richard Browne; United States	Arnu Fourie; South Africa
100 m	T46	Zhao Xu; China	Raciel Gonzalez Isidoria; Cuba	Ola Abidogun; Great Britain
200 m	T42	Richard Whitehead; Great Britain	Shaquille Vance; United States	Heinrich Popow; Germany
200 m	T44	Alan Fonteles Cardoso Oliveira; Brazil	Oscar Pistorius; South Africa	Blake Leeper; United States
200 m	T46	Yohansson Nascimento; Brazil	Raciel Gonzalez Isidoria; Cuba	Simon Patmore; Australia
400 m	T44	Oscar Pistorius; South Africa	Blake Leeper; United States	David Prince; United States
400 m	T46	Gunther Matzinger; Austria	Yohansson Nascimento; Brazil	Pradeep Uggl Dena Pathirannehelag; Sri Lanka
800 m	T46	Gunther Matzinger; Austria	Samir Nouioua; Algeria	Abraham Tarbei; Kenya
1500 m	T46	Abraham Tarbei; Kenya	Wondiye Fikre Indelbu; Ethiopia	Samir Nouioua; Algeria
4 × 100 m relay	T42/T46	South Africa (RSA); Samkelo Radebe; Zivan Smith; Arnu Fourie; Oscar Pistorius	China (CHN); Liu Zhiming; Liu Fuliang; Xie Hexing; Zhao Xu	Germany (GER); Markus Rehm; Heinrich Popow; David Behre; Wojtek Czyz
Marathon	T46	Tito Sena; Brazil	Abderrahman Ait Khamouch; Spain	Frederic van den Heede; Belgium
Long jump	F42/44	Markus Rehm; Germany	Wojtek Czyz; Germany	Daniel Jorgensen; Denmark
Long jump	F46	Liu Fuliang; China	Arnaud Assoumani; France	Huseyn Hasanov; Azerbaijan
Triple jump	F46	Liu Fuliang; China	Arnaud Assoumani; France	Aliaksandr Subota; Belarus
High jump	F42	Iliesa Delana; Fiji	Girisha Hosanagara Nagarajegowda; India	Lukasz Mamczarz; Poland
High jump	F46	Maciej Lepiato; Poland	Jeff Skiba; United States	Chen Hongjie; China
Shot put	F42/44	Jackie Christiansen; Denmark	Darko Kralj; Croatia	Aled Davies; Great Britain
Shot put	F46	Nikita Prokhorov; Russia	Hou Zhanbiao; China	Tomasz Rebisz; Poland
Discus throw	F42	Aled Davies; Great Britain	Mehrdad Karam Zadeh; Iran	Wang Lezheng; China
Discus throw	F44	Jeremy Campbell; United States	Dan Greaves; Great Britain	Farzad Sepahvand; Iran
Javelin throw	F42	Fu Yanlong; China	Kamran Shokrisalari; Iran	Runar Steinstad; Norway
Javelin throw	F44	Gao Mingjie; China	Tony Falelavaki; France	Ronald Hertog; Netherlands

==== Women's events ====
Event	Classification	Gold	Silver	Bronze
100 m	T42	Martina Caironi; Italy	Kelly Cartwright; Australia	Jana Schmidt; Germany
100 m	T44	Marie-Amelie le Fur; France	Marlou van Rhijn; Netherlands	April Holmes; United States
100 m	T46	Yunidis Castillo; Cuba	Nikol Rodomakina; Russia	Wang Yanping; China
200 m	T44	Marlou van Rhijn; Netherlands	Marie-Amelie le Fur; France	Katrin Green; Germany
200 m	T46	Yunidis Castillo; Cuba	Alicja Fiodorow; Poland	Anrune Liebenberg; South Africa
400 m	T46	Yunidis Castillo; Cuba	Anrune Liebenberg; South Africa	Alicja Fiodorow; Poland
Long jump	F42/44	Kelly Cartwright; Australia	Stefanie Reid; Great Britain	Marie-Amelie le Fur; France
Long jump	F46	Nikol Rodomakina; Russia	Carlee Beattie; Australia	Ouyang Jingling; China
Shot put	F42/44	Yao Juan; China	Yang Yue; China	Michaela Floeth; Germany
Javelin throw	F46	Katarzyna Piekart; Poland	Nataliya Gudkova; Russia	Madeleine Hogan; Australia

=== T/F51–58 ===
==== Men's events ====
Event	Classification	Gold	Silver	Bronze
100 m	T51	Toni Piispanen; Finland	Alvise de Vidi; Italy	Mohamed Berrahal; Algeria
100 m	T52	Raymond Martin; United States	Salvador Hernandez Mondragon; Mexico	Paul Nitz; United States
100 m	T53	Mickey Bushell; Great Britain	Zhao Yufei; China	Yu Shiran; China
100 m	T54	Leo Pekka Tahti; Finland	Liu Yang; China	Saichon Konjen; Thailand
200 m	T52	Raymond Martin; United States	Tomoya Ito; Japan	Salvador Hernandez Mondragon; Mexico
200 m	T53	Li Huzhao; China	Brent Lakatos; Canada	Zhao Yufei; China
400 m	T52	Raymond Martin; United States	Tomoya Ito; Japan	Thomas Geierspichler; Austria
400 m	T53	Li Huzhao; China	Brent Lakatos; Canada	Richard Colman; Australia
400 m	T54	Zhang Lixin; China	Kenny van Weeghel; Netherlands	Liu Chengming; China
800 m	T52	Raymond Martin; United States	Tomoya Ito; Japan	Leonardo De Jesus Perez Juarez; Mexico
800 m	T53	Richard Colman; Australia	Brent Lakatos; Canada	Joshua George; United States
800 m	T54	David Weir; Great Britain	Marcel Hug; Switzerland	Saichon Konjen; Thailand
1500 m	T54	David Weir; Great Britain	Prawat Wahoram; Thailand	Kim Gyu Dae; South Korea
5000 m	T54	David Weir; Great Britain	Kurt Fearnley; Australia	Julien Casoli; France
Marathon	T54	David Weir; Great Britain	Marcel Hug; Switzerland	Kurt Fearnley; Australia
4 × 400 m relay	T53/T54	China (CHN); Liu Yang; Liu Chengming; Li Huzhao; Zhang Lixin	Thailand (THA); Supachai Koysub; Saichon Konjen; Sopa Intasen; Prawat Wahoram	Australia (AUS); Richard Nicholson; Natheniel Arkley; Matthew Cameron; Richard Colman
Shot put	F52/53	Aigars Apinis; Latvia	Mauro Maximo de Jesus; Mexico	Scot Severn; United States
Shot put	F54/55/56	Jalil Bagheri Jeddi; Iran	Karol Kozun; Poland	Robin Womack; Great Britain
Shot put	F57/58	Alexey Ashapatov; Russia	Janusz Rokicki; Poland	Michael Louwrens; South Africa
Club throw	F31/32/51	Zeljko Dimitrijevic; Serbia	Radim Beles; Czech Republic	Lahouari Bahlaz (*); Algeria
Discus throw	F51/52/53	Mohamed Berrahal; Algeria	Aigars Apinis; Latvia	Mohamed Zemzemi; Tunisia
Discus throw	F54/55/56	Leonardo Diaz; Cuba	Draženko Mitrović; Serbia	Ali Mohammad Yari; Iran
Discus throw	F57/58	Alexey Ashapatov; Russia	Rostislav Pohlmann; Czech Republic	Metawa Abouelkhir; Egypt
Javelin throw	F52/53	Alphanso Cunningham; Jamaica	Abdolreza Jokar; Iran	Mauro Maximo de Jesus; Mexico
Javelin throw	F54/55/56	Luis Alberto Zepeda Felix; Mexico	Alexey Kuznetsov; Russia	Manolis Stefanoudakis; Greece
Javelin throw	F57/58	Mohammad Khalvandi; Iran	Claudiney Batista dos Santos; Brazil	Raed Salem; Egypt

(*) class F32 athlete

==== Women's events ====
Event	Classification	Gold	Silver	Bronze
100 m	T52	Marieke Vervoort; Belgium	Michelle Stilwell; Canada	Kerry Morgan; United States
100 m	T53	Huang Lisha; China	Zhou Hongzhuan; China	Angela Ballard; Australia
100 m	T54	Liu Wenjun; China	Dong Hongjiao; China	Tatyana McFadden; United States
200 m	T52	Michelle Stilwell; Canada	Marieke Vervoort; Belgium	Kerry Morgan; United States
200 m	T53	Huang Lisha; China	Angela Ballard; Australia	Zhou Hongzhuan; China
400 m	T53	Zhou Hongzhuan; China	Angela Ballard; Australia	Huang Lisha; China
400 m	T54	Tatyana McFadden; United States	Dong Hongjiao; China	Edith Wolf; Switzerland
800 m	T53	Zhou Hongzhuan; China	Huang Lisha; China	Jessica Galli; United States
800 m	T54	Tatyana McFadden; United States	Edith Wolf; Switzerland	Zou Lihong; China
1500 m	T54	Tatyana McFadden; United States	Edith Wolf; Switzerland	Shirley Reilly; United States
5000 m	T54	Edith Wolf; Switzerland	Shirley Reilly; United States	Christie Dawes; Australia
Marathon	T54	Shirley Reilly; United States	Shelly Woods; Great Britain	Sandra Graf; Switzerland
Shot put	F54/55/56	Yang Liwan; China	Marianne Buggenhagen; Germany	Angela Madsen; United States
Shot put	F57/58	Angeles Ortiz Hernandez; Mexico	Stela Eneva; Bulgaria	Eucharia Iyiazi; Nigeria
Club throw	F31/32/51	All medals were won by class F32 athletes		
Discus throw	F51/52/53	Josie Pearson; Great Britain	Catherine O'Neill; Ireland	Zena Cole; United States
Discus throw	F57/58	Nassima Saifi; Algeria	Stela Eneva; Bulgaria	Orla Barry; Ireland
Javelin	F33/34/52/53	All medals were won by class F34 athletes		
Javelin	F54/55/56	Yang Liwan; China	Hania Aidi; Tunisia	Martina Willing; Germany
Javelin	F57/58	Liu Ming; China	Safia Djelal; Algeria	Larisa Volik; Russia

== Boccia ==
Event	Gold	Silver	Bronze
Individual BC1	Pattaya Tadtong; Thailand	David Smith; Great Britain	Roger Aandalen; Norway
Individual BC2	Maciel Sousa Santos; Brazil	Yan Zhiqiang; China	So-Yeong Jeong; South Korea
Individual BC3	Ye-Jin Choi; South Korea	Ho-Won Jeong; South Korea	José Macedo; Portugal
Individual BC4	Dirceu Pinto; Brazil	Yuansen Zheng; China	Eliseu dos Santos; Brazil
Team BC1–2	Thailand (THA); Witsanu Huadpradit; Mongkol Jitsa-Ngiem; Pattaya Tadtong; Watcharaphon Vongsa	China (CHN); Zhiqiang Yan; Weibo Yuan; Qi Zhang; Kai Zhong	Great Britain (GBR); Dan Bentley; Nigel Murray; Zoe Robinson; David Smith
Pairs BC3	Greece (GRE); Maria-Eleni Kordali; Nikolaos Pananos; Grigorios Polychronidis	Portugal (POR); Armando Costa; José Macedo; Luis Silva	Belgium (BEL); Pieter Cilissen; Kirsten de Laender; Pieter Verlinden
Pairs BC4	Brazil (BRA); Dirceu José Pinto; Eliseu dos Santos	Czech Republic (CZE); Radek Procházka; Leoš Lacina	Canada (CAN); Marco Dispaltro; Josh Vander Vies

== Cycling ==
=== Road cycling ===
==== Men's events ====
Event	Class	Gold	Silver	Bronze
Time trial	B	Christian Venge; Spain	Ivano Pizzi; Italy	James Brown; Ireland
Time trial	H1	Mark Rohan; Ireland	Koby Lion; Israel	Wolfgang Schattauer; Austria
Time trial	H2	Heinz Frei; Switzerland	Walter Ablinger; Austria	Vittorio Podesta; Italy
Time trial	H3	Rafal Wilk; Poland	Nigel Barley; Australia	Bernd Jeffre; Germany
Time trial	H4	Alex Zanardi; Italy	Norbert Mosandl; Germany	Oscar Sanchez; United States
Time trial	C1	Michael Teuber; Germany	Mark Colbourne; Great Britain	Zhang Yu Li; China
Time trial	C2	Tobias Graf; Germany	Guihua Liang; China	Maurice Eckhard Tió; Spain
Time trial	C3	David Nicholas; Australia	Joseph Berenyi; United States	Masaki Fujita; Japan
Time trial	C4	Jiří Ježek; Czech Republic	Carol-Eduard Novak; Romania	Jiří Bouška; Czech Republic
Time trial	C5	Yegor Dementyev; Ukraine	Xinyang Liu; China	Michael Gallagher; Australia
Road race	B	Ivano Pizzi; Italy	Krzysztof Kosikowski; Poland	Vladislav Janovjak; Slovakia
Road race	H1	Mark Rohan; Ireland	Tobias Fankhauser; Switzerland	Wolfgang Schattauer; Austria
Road race	H2	Walter Ablinger; Austria	Jean-Marc Berset; Switzerland	Vittorio Podesta; Italy
Road race	H3	Rafal Wilk; Poland	Vico Merklein; Germany	Joël Jeannot; France
Road race	H4	Alex Zanardi; Italy	Ernst van Dyk; South Africa	Wim Decleir; Belgium
Road race	C1-3	Roberto Bargna; Italy	Steffen Warias; Germany	David Nicholas; Australia
Road race	C4-5	Yegor Dementyev; Ukraine	Xinyang Liu; China	Michele Pittacolo; Italy

==== Women's events ====
Event	Class	Gold	Silver	Bronze
Time trial	B	Kathrin Goeken; Netherlands	Phillipa Gray; New Zealand	Catherine Walsh; Ireland
Time trial	H1-2	Marianna Davis; United States	Karen Darke; Great Britain	Ursula Schwaller; Switzerland
Time trial	H3	Sandra Graf; Switzerland	Monica Bascio; United States	Svetlana Moshkovich; Russia
Time trial	H4	Andrea Eskau; Germany	Dorothee Vieth; Germany	Laura de Vaan; Netherlands
Time trial	C1-3	Allison Jones; United States	Tereza Diepoldová; Czech Republic	Sini Zeng; China
Time trial	C4	Megan Fisher; United States	Susan Powell; Australia	Marie-Claude Molnar; Canada
Time trial	C5	Sarah Storey; Great Britain	Anna Harkowska; Poland	Kelly Crowley; United States
Road race	B	Robbi Weldon; Canada	Josefa Benitez Guzman; Spain	Kathrin Goeken; Netherlands
Road race	H1-3	Marianna Davis; United States	Monica Bascio; United States	Rachel Morris; Great Britain
Road race	H4	Andrea Eskau; Germany	Laura de Vaan; Netherlands	Dorothee Veith; Germany
Road race	C1-3	Sini Zeng; China	Denise Schindler; Germany	Allison Jones; United States
Road race	C4-5	Sarah Storey; Great Britain	Anna Harkowska; Poland	Kelly Crowley; United States

==== Mixed events ====
Event	Class	Gold	Silver	Bronze
Time trial	T1-2	Carol Cooke; Australia	Hans-Peter Durst; Germany	David Stone; Great Britain
Road race	T1-2	David Stone; Great Britain	Giorgio Farroni; Italy	David Vondracek; Czech Republic
Team Relay	T1-4	United States (USA); Marianna Davis; Oscar Sanchez; Matthew Updike	Italy (ITA); Alex Zanardi; Vittorio Podesta; Francesca Fenocchio	Switzerland (SUI); Jean-Marc Berset; Ursula Schwaller; Heinz Frei

=== Track cycling ===
==== Men's events ====
Event	Class	Gold	Silver	Bronze
1 km time trial	B	Neil Fachie; Great Britain	José Enrique Porto Lareo; Spain	Rinne Oost; Netherlands
1 km time trial	C1-3	Zhang Yu Li; China	Mark Colbourne; Great Britain	Tobias Graf; Germany
1 km time trial	C4-5	Alfonso Cabello; Spain	Jon-Allan Butterworth; Great Britain	Xinyang Liu; China
Individual pursuit	B	Kieran Modra; Australia	Bryce Lindores; Australia	Miguel Ángel Clemente Solano; Spain
Individual pursuit	C1	Mark Colbourne; Great Britain	Zhang Yu Li; China	Rodrigo Fernando López; Argentina
Individual pursuit	C2	Guihua Liang; China	Tobias Graf; Germany	Laurent Thirionet; France
Individual pursuit	C3	Joseph Berenyi; United States	Shaun McKeown; Great Britain	Darren Kenny; Great Britain
Individual pursuit	C4	Carol-Eduard Novak; Romania	Jiří Ježek; Czech Republic	Jody Cundy; Great Britain
Individual pursuit	C5	Michael Gallagher; Australia	Jon-Allan Butterworth; Great Britain	Liu Xinyang; China
Individual Sprint	B	Anthony Kappes; Great Britain	Neil Fachie; Great Britain	José Enrique Porto Lareo; Spain

==== Women's events ====
Event	Class	Gold	Silver	Bronze
Time trial	C1-3 (500 m)	He Yin; China	Alyda Norbruis; Netherlands	Jayme Paris; Australia
Time trial	C4-5 (500 m)	Sarah Storey; Great Britain	Jennifer Schuble; United States	Jianping Ruan; China
Time trial	B (1 km)	Felicity Johnson; Australia	Aileen McGlynn; Great Britain	Phillipa Gray; New Zealand
Individual pursuit	B	Phillipa Gray; New Zealand	Catherine Walsh; Ireland	Aileen McGlynn; Great Britain
Individual pursuit	C1-3	Sini Zeng; China	Simone Kennedy; Australia	Allison Jones; United States
Individual pursuit	C4	Susan Powell; Australia	Megan Fisher; United States	Alexandra Green; Australia
Individual pursuit	C5	Sarah Storey; Great Britain	Anna Harkowska; Poland	Fiona Southorn; New Zealand

==== Mixed events ====
Event	Class	Gold	Silver	Bronze
Team Sprint	C1-5	China (CHN); Xiaofei Ji; Xinyang Liu; Hao Xie	Great Britain (GBR); Jon-Allan Butterworth; Darren Kenny; Richard Waddon	United States (USA); Joseph Berenyi; Sam Kavanagh; Jennifer Schuble

== Equestrian ==
Event	Gold	Silver	Bronze
Individual championship test grade Ia	Sophie Christiansen; Great Britain	Helen Kearney; Ireland	Laurentia Tan; Singapore
Individual championship test grade Ib	Joann Formosa; Australia	Lee Pearson; Great Britain	Pepo Puch; Austria
Individual championship test grade II	Natasha Baker; Great Britain	Britta Näpel; Germany	Angelika Trabert; Germany
Individual championship test grade III	Hannelore Brenner; Germany	Deborah Criddle; Great Britain	Annika Dalskov; Denmark
Individual championship test grade IV	Michèle George; Belgium	Sophie Wells; Great Britain	Frank Hosmar; Netherlands
Individual freestyle test grade Ia	Sophie Christiansen; Great Britain	Laurentia Tan; Singapore	Helen Kearney; Ireland
Individual freestyle test grade Ib	Pepo Puch; Austria	Katja Karjalainen; Finland	Lee Pearson; Great Britain
Individual freestyle test grade II	Natasha Baker; Great Britain	Britta Näpel; Germany	Angelika Trabert; Germany
Individual freestyle test grade III	Hannelore Brenner; Germany	Deborah Criddle; Great Britain	Annika Dalskov; Denmark
Individual freestyle test grade IV	Michèle George; Belgium	Sophie Wells; Great Britain	Frank Hosmar; Netherlands
Mixed team test grade	Great Britain (GBR); Lee Pearson; Sophie Wells; Deborah Criddle; Sophie Christiansen	Germany (GER); Angelika Trabert; Britta Näpel; Steffen Zeibig; Hannelore Brenner	Ireland (IRL); Eilish Byrne; James Dwyer; Geraldine Savage; Helen Kearney

== Football 5-a-side ==
Event	Gold	Silver	Bronze
Men's team	Brazil (BRA); Fabio Luiz; Daniel; Emerson; Gledson; Cassio; Marcos Jose; Jeferson; Severino; Ricardo; Raimundo	France (FRA); Frederic Jannas; Hakim Arezki; Abderrahim Maya; Yvan Wouandji Kepmegni; David Labarre; Jonathan Grangier; Gaël Riviere; Martin Baron; Arnaud Ayax; Frederic Villeroux	Spain (ESP); Álvaro Gonzalez Alcaraz; José Luis Giera Tejuelo; Francisco Muñoz Pérez; Adolfo Acosta Rodriguez; José López Ramírez; Alfredo Cuadrado Freire; Antonio Martín Gaitán; Youssef El Haddaoui Rabii; Marcelo Rosado Carrasco; Raul Díaz Ortín

== Football 7-a-side ==
Event	Gold	Silver	Bronze
Men's team	Russia; Aleksandr Lekov; Vladislav Raretckii; Aslanbek Sapiev; Alexey Tumakov; Lasha Murvanadze; Aleksei Chesmin; Ivan Potekhin (captain); Eduard Ramonov; Viacheslav Larionov; Zaurbek Pagaev; Andrei Kuvaev; Aleksandr Kuligin	Ukraine; Kostyantyn Symashko; Igor Kosenko; Vitaliy Trushev; Yevhen Zinoviev; Taras Dutko; Anatolii Shevchyk; Oleksiy Hetun; Volodymyr Antoniuk (captain); Ivan Shkvarlo; Ivan Dotsenko; Denys Ponomaryov; Oleksandr Devlysh	Iran; Mehran Nikoee Majd; Moslem Khazaeipirsarabi; Ehsan Gholamhosseinpour Bousheh; Morteza Heidari; Bahman Ansari; Hashem Rastegarimobin; Sadegh Hassani Baghi; Farzad Mehri; Jasem Bakhshi; Moslem Akbari (captain); Rasoul Atashafrouz; Abdolreza Karimizadeh

== Goalball ==
Event	Gold	Silver	Bronze
Men's goalball	Finland (FIN); Jarno Mattila; Ville Montonen; Erkki Miinala; Toni Alenius; Tuomas Nousu; Petri Posio	Brazil (BRA); José Ferreira de Oliveira; Almeida Maciel Celente; Leomon Moreno da Silva; Romário Diego Marques; Filippe Santos Silvestre; Leandro Moreno da Silva	Turkey (TUR); Tekin Okan Düzgün; Hüseyin Alkan; Mehmet Cesur; Yusuf Uçar; Abdullah Aydoğdu; Tuncay Karakaya
Women's goalball	Japan (JPN); Masae Komiya; Rie Urata; Akane Nakashima; Eiko Kakehata; Haruka Wakasugi; Akiko Adachi	China (CHN); Wang Ruixue; Chen Fengqing; Lin Shan; Wang Shasha; Fan Feifei; Ju Zhen	Sweden (SWE); Anna Dahlberg; Malin Gustavsson; Josefine Jälmestål; Viktoria Andersson; Sofia Näsström; Maria Wåglund

== Judo ==
=== Men's events ===
Event	Gold	Silver	Bronze
60 kg	Ramin Ibrahimov; Azerbaijan	Li Xiaodong; China	Mouloud Noura; Algeria
60 kg	Ramin Ibrahimov; Azerbaijan	Li Xiaodong; China	Ben Quilter; Great Britain
66 kg	Davyd Khorava; Ukraine	Zhao Xu; China	Sid Ali Lamri; Algeria
66 kg	Davyd Khorava; Ukraine	Zhao Xu; China	Marcos Falcon; Venezuela
73 kg	Dmytro Solovey; Ukraine	Sharif Khalilov; Uzbekistan	Shakhban Kurbanov; Russia
73 kg	Dmytro Solovey; Ukraine	Sharif Khalilov; Uzbekistan	Eduardo Ávila Sánchez; Mexico
81 kg	Olexandr Kosinov; Ukraine	Jose Effron; Argentina	Isao Cruz Alonso; Cuba
81 kg	Olexandr Kosinov; Ukraine	Jose Effron; Argentina	Matthias Krieger; Germany
90 kg	Jorge Hierrezuelo Marcillis; Cuba	Samuel Ingram; Great Britain	Jorge Lecina; Argentina
90 kg	Jorge Hierrezuelo Marcillis; Cuba	Samuel Ingram; Great Britain	Dartanyon Crockett; United States
100 kg	Gwang-Geun Choi; South Korea	Myles Porter; United States	Antônio Tenório Silva; Brazil
100 kg	Gwang-Geun Choi; South Korea	Myles Porter; United States	Vladimir Fedin; Russia
+100 kg	Kento Masaki; Japan	Song Wang; China	Yangaliny Jiménez Domínguez; Cuba
+100 kg	Kento Masaki; Japan	Song Wang; China	Ilham Zakiyev; Azerbaijan

=== Women's events ===
Event	Gold	Silver	Bronze
48 kg	Carmen Brussig; Germany	Kai-Lin Lee; Chinese Taipei	Victoria Potapova; Russia
48 kg	Carmen Brussig; Germany	Kai-Lin Lee; Chinese Taipei	Yuliya Halinska; Ukraine
52 kg	Ramona Brussig; Germany	Lijing Wang; China	Nataliya Nikolaychyk; Ukraine
52 kg	Ramona Brussig; Germany	Lijing Wang; China	Michele Ferreira; Brazil
57 kg	Afag Sultanova; Azerbaijan	Lúcia da Silva Teixeira; Brazil	Monica Merenciano Herrero; Spain
57 kg	Afag Sultanova; Azerbaijan	Lúcia da Silva Teixeira; Brazil	Duygu Çete; Turkey
63 kg	Dalidaivis Rodriguez Clark; Cuba	Tong Zhou; China	Daniele Bernardes Milan; Brazil
63 kg	Dalidaivis Rodriguez Clark; Cuba	Tong Zhou; China	Marta Arce Payno; Spain
70 kg	Carmen Herrera; Spain	Tatiana Savostyanova; Russia	Qian Zhou; China
70 kg	Carmen Herrera; Spain	Tatiana Savostyanova; Russia	Nikolett Szabó; Hungary
+70 kg	Yanping Yuan; China	Nazan Akın; Turkey	Zoubida Bouazoug; Algeria
+70 kg	Yanping Yuan; China	Nazan Akın; Turkey	Irina Kalyanova; Russia

== Powerlifting ==
=== Women's events ===
Event	Gold	Silver	Bronze
40 kg	Nazmiye Muslu; Turkey	Cui Zhe; China	Zoe Newson; Great Britain
44 kg	Ivory Nwokorie; Nigeria	Çiğdem Dede; Turkey	Lidiia Soloviova; Ukraine
48 kg	Esther Oyema; Nigeria	Olesya Lafina; Russia	Shi Shanshan; China
52 kg	Joy Onaolapo; Nigeria	Tamara Podpalnaya; Russia	Xiao Cuijuan; China
56 kg	Fatma Omar; Egypt	Lucy Ejike; Nigeria	Özlem Becerikli; Turkey
60 kg	Amalia Pérez; Mexico	Yang Yan; China	Amal Mahmoud; Egypt
67.5 kg	Souhad Ghazouani; France	Tan Yujiao; China	Victoria Nneji; Nigeria
75 kg	Fu Taoying; China	Folashade Oluwafemiayo; Nigeria	Lin Tzu-hui; Chinese Taipei
82.5 kg	Loveline Obiji; Nigeria	Randa Mahmoud; Egypt	Xu Yanmei; China
+82.5 kg	Grace Anozie; Nigeria	Heba Ahmed; Egypt	Perla Bárcenas; Mexico

=== Men's events ===
Event	Gold	Silver	Bronze
48 kg	Yakubu Adesokan; Nigeria	Vladimir Balynetc; Russia	Taha Abdelmagid; Egypt
52 kg	Feng Qi; China	Ikechukwu Obichukwu; Nigeria	Vladimir Krivulya; Russia
56 kg	Sherif Othman; Egypt	Anthony Ulonnam; Nigeria	Wang Jian; China
60 kg	Nader Moradi; Iran	Ifeanyi Nnajiofor; Nigeria	Yang Quanxi; China
67.5 kg	Liu Lei; China	Rouhollah Rostami; Iran	Shaaban Ibrahim; Egypt
75 kg	Ali Hosseini; Iran	Mohamed Elelfat; Egypt	Hu Peng; China
82.5 kg	Majid Farzin; Iran	Gu Xiaofei; China	Metwaly Mathana; Egypt
90 kg	Hany Abdelhady; Egypt	Cai Huichao; China	Pavlos Mamalos; Greece
100 kg	Mohamed Eldib; Egypt	Qi Dong; China	Ali Sadeghzadeh; Iran
+100 kg	Siamand Rahman; Iran	Faris Al-Ajeeli; Iraq	Chun Keun-Bae; South Korea

== Rowing ==
Event	Gold	Silver	Bronze
Men's single sculls	Cheng Huang; China	Erik Horrie; Australia	Aleksey Chuvashev; Russia
Women's single sculls	Alla Lysenko; Ukraine	Nathalie Benoit; France	Liudmila Vauchok; Belarus
Mixed double sculls	China (CHN); Lou Xiaoxian; Fei Tianming	France (FRA); Perle Bouge; Stephane Tardieu	United States (USA); Oksana Masters; Rob Jones
Mixed coxed four	Great Britain (GBR); Pam Relph; Naomi Riches; David Smith; James Roe; Lily van den Broecke (Cox)	Germany (GER); Anke Molkenthin; Astrid Hengsbach; Tino Kolitscher; Kai Kruse; Katrin Splitt (Cox)	Ukraine (UKR); Andrii Stelmakh; Kateryna Morozova; Yelena Pukhayeva; Denys Sobol; Volodymyr Kozlov (Cox)

== Sailing ==
Event	Gold	Silver	Bronze
One Person Keelboat – 2.4 MR	Helena Lucas; Great Britain	Heiko Kroeger; Germany	Thierry Schmitter; Netherlands
Two Person Keelboat – SKUD 18	Australia (AUS); Dan Fitzgibbon; Liesl Tesch	United States (USA); Jean-Paul Creignou; Jennifer French	Great Britain (GBR); Alexandra Rickham; Niki Birrell
Open Three Person Keelboat – Sonar	Netherlands (NED); Mischa Rossen; Marcel van de Veen; Udo Hessels	Germany (GER); Jens Kroker; Robert Prem; Siegmund Mainka	Norway (NOR); Aleksander Wang-Hansen; Marie Solberg; Per Eugen Kristiansen

== Shooting ==
Event	Gold	Silver	Bronze
Men's 10m air pistol SH1	Park Sea-Kyun; South Korea	Muharrem Korhan Yamaç; Turkey	Lee Ju-Hee; South Korea
Men's 10m air rifle standing SH1	Dong Chao; China	Jonas Jacobsson; Sweden	Josef Neumaier; Germany
Men's 50m rifle 3 positions SH1	Jonas Jacobsson; Sweden	Doron Shaziri; Israel	Dong Chao; China
Women's 10m air pistol SH1	Olivera Nakovska-Bikova; Macedonia	Marina Klimenchenko; Russia	Sareh Javanmardi; Iran
Women's 10m air rifle standing SH1	Cuiping Zhang; China	Manuela Schmermund; Germany	Natalie Smith; Australia
Women's 50m rifle 3 positions SH1	Cuiping Zhang; China	Shibei Dang; China	Veronika Vadovičová; Slovakia
Mixed 25m pistol SH1	Jianfei Li; China	Sergey Malyshev; Russia	Valery Ponomarenko; Russia
Mixed 50m pistol SH1	Park Sea-Kyun; South Korea	Valery Ponomarenko; Russia	Hedong Ni; China
Mixed 10m air rifle prone SH1	Cédric Fèvre; France	Matt Skelhon; Great Britain	Cuiping Zhang; China
Mixed 10m air rifle prone SH2	Vasyl Kovalchuk; Ukraine	Raphaël Voltz; France	James Bevis; Great Britain
Mixed 10m air rifle standing SH2	Ju-Young Kang; South Korea	Franček Gorazd Tiršek; Slovenia	Michael Johnson; New Zealand
Mixed 50m rifle prone SH1	Abdulla Sultan Alaryani; United Arab Emirates	Juan Antonio Saavedra Reinaldo; Spain	Matthew Skelhon; Great Britain

== Swimming ==
=== Men's events ===
Event	Gold	Silver	Bronze
50 m freestyle S2	Yang Yang; China	Dmitry Kokarev; Russia	Aristeidis Makrodimitris; Greece
50 m freestyle S4	Eskender Mustafaiev; Ukraine	David Smétanine; France	Jan Povýšil; Czech Republic
50 m freestyle S5	Daniel Dias; Brazil	Sebastián Rodríguez; Spain	Roy Perkins; United States
50 m freestyle S6	Qing Xu; China	Lorenzo Perez Escalona; Cuba	Tao Zheng; China
50 m freestyle S7	Lantz Lamback; United States	Shiyun Pan; China	Matthew Walker; Great Britain
50 m freestyle S8	Denis Tarasov; Russia	Maurice Deelen; Netherlands	Yinan Wang; China
50 m freestyle S9	Matthew Cowdrey; Australia	Tamás Tóth; Hungary	Jose Antonio Mari Alcaraz; Spain
50 m freestyle S10	André Brasil; Brazil	Nathan Stein; Canada	Andrew Pasterfield; Australia
50 m freestyle S11	Bozun Yang; China	Bradley Snyder; United States	Enhamed Enhamed; Spain
50 m freestyle S12	Maksym Veraksa; Ukraine	Aleksandr Nevolin-Svetov; Russia	Tucker Dupree; United States
50 m freestyle S13	Charl Bouwer; South Africa	Ihar Boki; Belarus	Oleksii Fedyna; Ukraine
100 m freestyle S2	Yang Yang; China	Dmitry Kokarev; Russia	Aristeidis Makrodimitris; Greece
100 m freestyle S4	Gustavo Sanchez Martinez; Mexico	Richard Oribe; Spain	David Smetanine; France
100 m freestyle S5	Daniel Dias; Brazil	Roy Perkins; United States	Sebastián Rodríguez; Spain
100 m freestyle S6	Qing Xu; China	Sebastian Iwanow; Germany	Lorenzo Perez Escalona; Cuba
100 m freestyle S7	Shiyun Pan; China	Matt Levy; Australia	Lantz Lamback; United States
100 m freestyle S8	Yinan Wang; China	Denis Tarasov; Russia	Konstantin Lisenkov; Russia
100 m freestyle S9	Matthew Cowdrey; Australia	Tamás Tóth; Hungary	Tamás Sors; Hungary
100 m freestyle S10	Andre Brasil; Brazil	Phelipe Rodrigues; Brazil	Andrew Pasterfield; Australia
100 m freestyle S11	Bradley Snyder; United States	Bozun Yang; China	Hendri Herbst; South Africa
100 m freestyle S12	Maksym Veraksa; Ukraine	Aleksandr Nevolin-Svetov; Russia	Tucker Dupree; United States
100 m freestyle S13	Ihar Boki; Belarus	Charl Bouwer; South Africa	Aleksandr Golintovskii; Russia
200 m freestyle S2	Yang Yang; China	Dmitrii Kokarev; Russia	Itzhak Mamistvalov; Israel
200 m freestyle S4	Gustavo Sanchez Martinez; Mexico	David Smetanine; France	Richard Oribe; Spain
200 m freestyle S5	Daniel Dias; Brazil	Sebastián Rodríguez; Spain	Roy Perkins; United States
200 m freestyle S14	Jon Margeir Sverrisson; Iceland	Daniel Fox; Australia	Wonsang Cho; South Korea
400 m freestyle S6	Darragh McDonald; Ireland	Anders Olsson; Sweden	Matthew Whorwood; Great Britain
400 m freestyle S7	Josef Craig; Great Britain	Shiyun Pan; China	Andrey Gladkov; Russia
400 m freestyle S8	Yinan Wang; China	Oliver Hynd; Great Britain	Sam Hynd; Great Britain
400 m freestyle S9	Brenden Hall; Australia	Tamás Sors; Hungary	Federico Morlacchi; Italy
400 m freestyle S10	Ian Jaryd Silverman; United States	Benoit Huot; Canada	Robert Welbourn; Great Britain
400 m freestyle S11	Bradley Snyder; United States	Enhamed Enhamed; Spain	Bozun Yang; China
400 m freestyle S12	Sergey Punko; Russia	Enrique Floriano; Spain	Sergii Klippert; Ukraine
400 m freestyle S13	Ihar Boki; Belarus	Danylo Chufarov; Ukraine	Aleksandr Golintovskii; Russia
50 m backstroke S1	Hennadii Boiko; Ukraine	Christos Tampaxis; Greece	Oleksandr Golovko; Ukraine
50 m backstroke S2	Yang Yang; China	Aristeidis Makrodimitris; Greece	Dmitry Kokarev; Russia
50 m backstroke S3	Min Byeong-Eon; South Korea	Dmytro Vynohradets; Ukraine	Du Jianping; China
50 m backstroke S4	Juan Reyes; Mexico	Aleksei Lyzhikhin; Russia	Gustavo Sanchez Martinez; Mexico
50 m backstroke S5	Daniel Dias; Brazil	Junquan He; China	Zsolt Vereczkei; Hungary
100 m backstroke S6	Tao Zheng; China	Jia Hongguang; China	Sebastian Iwanow; Germany
100 m backstroke S7	Jonathan Fox; Great Britain	Yevheniy Bohodayko; Ukraine	Spanja Mihovil; Croatia
100 m backstroke S8	Konstantin Lisenkov; Russia	Denis Tarasov; Russia	Oliver Hynd; Great Britain
100 m backstroke S9	Matthew Cowdrey; Australia	James Crisp; Great Britain	Xiaobing Liu; China
100 m backstroke S10	Justin Zook; United States	Andre Brasil; Brazil	Benoit Huot; Canada
100 m backstroke S11	Dmytro Zalevskyy; Ukraine	Bozun Yang; China	Viktor Smyrnov; Ukraine
100 m backstroke S12	Aleksandr Nevolin-Svetov; Russia	Tucker Dupree; United States	Sergii Klippert; Ukraine
100 m backstroke S13	Ihar Boki; Belarus	Charl Bouwer; South Africa	Charalampos Taiganidis; Greece
100 m backstroke S14	Marc Evers; Netherlands	Aaron Moores; Great Britain	Kai Lun Au; Hong Kong
50 m breaststroke SB2	Jianping Du; China	Arnulfo Castorena; Mexico	Dmytro Vynohradets; Ukraine
50 m breaststroke SB3	Michael Schoenmaker; Netherlands	Miguel Luque; Spain	Takayuki Suzuki; Japan
100 m breaststroke SB4	Daniel Dias; Brazil	Moisés Fuentes; Colombia	Ricardo Ten; Spain
100 m breaststroke SB5	Woo-Geun Lim; South Korea	Niels Grunenberg; Germany	Pedro Rangel; Mexico
100 m breaststroke SB6	Yevheniy Bohodayko; Ukraine	Torben Schmidtke; Germany	Christoph Burkard; Germany
100 m breaststroke SB7	Blake Cochrane; Australia	Tomotaro Nakamura; Japan	Matt Levy; Australia
100 m breaststroke SB8	Andriy Kalyna; Ukraine	Matthew Cowdrey; Australia	Maurice Deelen; Netherlands
100 m breaststroke SB9	Pavel Poltavtsev; Russia	Kevin Paul; South Africa	Lin Furong; China
100 m breaststroke SB11	Bozun Yang; China	Keiichi Kimura; Japan	Oleksandr Mashchenko; Ukraine
100 m breaststroke SB12	Mikhail Zimin; Russia	Uladzimir Izotau; Belarus	Maksym Veraksa; Ukraine
100 m breaststroke SB13	Oleksii Fedyna; Ukraine	Daniel Sharp; New Zealand	Roman Dubovoy; Russia
100 m breaststroke SB14	Yasuhiro Tanaka; Japan	Artem Pavlenko; Russia	Marc Evers; Netherlands
50 m butterfly S5	Daniel Dias; Brazil	Roy Perkins; United States	Junquan He; China
50 m butterfly S6	Qing Xu; China	Tao Zheng; China	Kyosuke Oyama; Japan
50 m butterfly S7	Shiyun Pan; China	Yevheniy Bohodayko; Ukraine	Jingang Wang; China
100 m butterfly S8	Charles Rozoy; France	Yanpeng Wei; China	Maodang Song; China
100 m butterfly S9	Tamás Sors; Hungary	Matthew Cowdrey; Australia	Federico Morlacchi; Italy
100 m butterfly S10	André Brasil; Brazil	Dmitry Grigorev; Russia	Achmat Hassiem; South Africa
100 m butterfly S11	Viktor Smyrnov; Ukraine	Enhamed Enhamed; Spain	Keiichi Kimura; Japan
100 m butterfly S12	Roman Makarov; Russia	Sergey Punko; Russia	James Clegg; Great Britain
100 m butterfly S13	Ihar Boki; Belarus	Roman Dubovoy; Russia	Tim Antalfy; Australia
150 m individual medley SM3	Jianping Du; China	Dmytro Vynohradets; Ukraine	Hanhua Li; China
150 m individual medley SM4	Cameron Leslie; New Zealand	Gustavo Sanchez Martinez; Mexico	Takayuki Suzuki; Japan
200 m individual medley SM6	Qing Xu; China	Sascha Kindred; Great Britain	Tao Zheng; China
200 m individual medley SM7	Yevheniy Bohodayko; Ukraine	Rudy Garcia-Tolson; United States	Matt Levy; Australia
200 m individual medley SM8	Oliver Hynd; Great Britain	Jiachao Wang; China	Maurice Deelen; Netherlands
200 m individual medley SM9	Matthew Cowdrey; Australia	Andriy Kalyna; Ukraine	Federico Morlacchi; Italy
200 m individual medley SM10	Benoit Huot; Canada	André Brasil; Brazil	Rick Pendleton; Australia
200 m individual medley SM11	Yang Bozun; China	Viktor Smyrnov; Ukraine	Oleksandr Mashchenko; Ukraine
200 m individual medley SM12	Maksym Veraksa; Ukraine	Aleksandr Nevolin-Svetov; Russia	Sergey Punko; Russia
200 m individual medley SM13	Ihar Boki; Belarus	Roman Dubovoy; Russia	Danylo Chufarov; Ukraine
4×100 m freestyle 34pts	Australia (AUS); Andrew Pasterfield; Matt Levy; Blake Cochrane; Matthew Cowdrey	China (CHN); Song Maodang; Wang Jiachao; Lin Furong; Wang Yinan	Russia (RUS); Konstantin Lisenkov; Evgeny Zimin; Denis Tarasov; Dmitry Grigorev
4×100 m medley 34pts	China (CHN); Liu Xiaobing; Lin Furong; Wei Yanpeng; Wang Yinan	Russia (RUS); Konstantin Lisenkov; Pavel Poltavtsev; Eduard Samarin; Denis Tarasov	Australia (AUS); Michael Anderson; Matthew Cowdrey; Brenden Hall; Matt Levy

=== Women's events ===
Event	Gold	Silver	Bronze
50 m freestyle S3	Jiangbo Xia; China	Olga Sviderska; Ukraine	Patricia Valle; Mexico
50 m freestyle S5	Nataliia Prologaieva; Ukraine	Teresa Perales; Spain	Inbal Pezaro; Israel
50 m freestyle S6	Mirjam de Koning-Peper; Netherlands	Victoria Arlen; United States	Eleanor Simmonds; Great Britain
50 m freestyle S7	Jacqueline Freney; Australia	Cortney Jordan; United States	Ani Palian; Ukraine
50 m freestyle S8	Mallory Weggemann; United States	Maddison Elliott; Australia	Shengnan Jiang; China
50 m freestyle S9	Ping Lin; China	Louise Watkin; Great Britain	Ellie Cole; Australia
50 m freestyle S10	Summer Ashley Mortimer; Canada	Sophie Pascoe; New Zealand	Elodie Lorandi; France
50 m freestyle S11	Cecilia Camellini; Italy	Guizhi Li; China	Mary Fisher; New Zealand
50 m freestyle S12	Oxana Savchenko; Russia	Natali Pronina; Azerbaijan	Darya Stukalova; Russia
50 m freestyle S13	Kelley Becherer; United States	Valerie Grand-Maison; Canada	Prue Watt; Australia
100 m freestyle S3	Jiangbo Xia; China	Olga Sviderska; Ukraine	Patricia Valle; Mexico
100 m freestyle S5	Teresa Perales; Spain	Nataliia Prologaieva; Ukraine	Inbal Pezaro; Israel
100 m freestyle S6	Victoria Arlen; United States	Eleanor Simmonds; Great Britain	Tanja Groepper; Germany
100 m freestyle S7	Jacqueline Freney; Australia	Cortney Jordan; United States	Susannah Rodgers; Great Britain
100 m freestyle S8	Jessica Long; United States	Heather Frederiksen; Great Britain	Maddison Elliott; Australia
100 m freestyle S9	Ellie Cole; Australia	Natalie du Toit; South Africa	Sarai Gascón Moreno; Spain
100 m freestyle S10	Sophie Pascoe; New Zealand	Elodie Lorandi; France	Summer Ashley Mortimer; Canada
100 m freestyle S11	Cecilia Camellini; Italy	Mary Fisher; New Zealand	Guizhi Li; China
100 m freestyle S12	Oxana Savchenko; Russia	Natali Pronina; Azerbaijan	Darya Stukalova; Russia
100 m freestyle S13	Kelley Becherer; United States	Valerie Grand-Maison; Canada	Rebecca Anne Meyers; United States
200 m freestyle S5	Sarah Louise Rung; Norway	Teresa Perales; Spain	Inbal Pezaro; Israel
200 m freestyle S14	Jessica-Jane Applegate; Great Britain	Taylor Corry; Australia	Marlou van der Kulk; Netherlands
400 m freestyle S6	Eleanor Simmonds; Great Britain	Victoria Arlen; United States	Lingling Song; China
400 m freestyle S7	Jacqueline Freney; Australia	Cortney Jordan; United States	Susannah Rodgers; Great Britain
400 m freestyle S8	Jessica Long; United States	Heather Frederiksen; Great Britain	Maddison Elliott; Australia
400 m freestyle S9	Natalie du Toit; South Africa	Stephanie Millward; Great Britain	Ellie Cole; Australia
400 m freestyle S10	Elodie Lorandi; France	Aurelie Rivard; Canada	Susan Beth Scott; France
400 m freestyle S11	Daniela Schulte; Germany	Amber Thomas; Canada	Cecilia Camellini; Italy
400 m freestyle S12	Oxana Savchenko; Russia	Hannah Russell; Great Britain	Deborah Font; Spain
50 m backstroke S2	Yazhu Feng; China	Ganna Ielisavetska; Ukraine	Iryna Sotska; Ukraine
50 m backstroke S4	Lisette Teunissen; Netherlands	Edenia Garcia; Brazil	Juan Bai; China
100 m backstroke S6	Lu Dong; China	Nyree Kindred; Great Britain	Mirjam De Koning-Peper; Netherlands
100 m backstroke S7	Jacqueline Freney; Australia	Kirsten Bruhn; Germany	Cortney Jordan; United States
100 m backstroke S8	Heather Frederiksen; Great Britain	Jessica Long; United States	Olesya Vladykina; Russia
100 m backstroke S9	Ellie Cole; Australia	Stephanie Millward; Great Britain	Elizabeth Stone; United States
100 m backstroke S10	Summer Ashley Mortimer; Canada	Sophie Pascoe; New Zealand	Shireen Sapiro; South Africa
100 m backstroke S11	Rina Akiyama; Japan	Mary Fisher; New Zealand	Cecilia Camellini; Italy
100 m backstroke S12	Oxana Savchenko; Russia	Natali Pronina; Azerbaijan	Hannah Russell; Great Britain
100 m backstroke S14	Bethany Firth; Ireland	Taylor Corry; Australia	Marlou van der Kulk; Netherlands
100 m breaststroke SB4	Nataliia Prologaieva; Ukraine	Sarah Louise Rung; Norway	Teresa Perales; Spain
100 m breaststroke SB5	Kirsten Bruhn; Germany	Lingling Song; China	Noga Nir-Kistler; United States
100 m breaststroke SB6	Viktoriia Savtsova; Ukraine	Charlotte Henshaw; Great Britain	Elizabeth Johnson; Great Britain
100 m breaststroke SB7	Jessica Long; United States	Oksana Khrul; Ukraine	Lisa den Braber; Netherlands
100 m breaststroke SB8	Olesya Vladykina; Russia	Claire Cashmore; Great Britain	Paulina Woźniak; Poland
100 m breaststroke SB9	Khrystyna Yurchenko; Ukraine	Sophie Pascoe; New Zealand	Harriet Lee; Great Britain
100 m breaststroke SB11	Maja Reichard; Sweden	Yana Berezhna; Ukraine	Nadia Baez; Argentina
100 m breaststroke SB12	Natali Pronina; Azerbaijan	Karolina Pelendritou; Cyprus	Yaryna Matlo; Ukraine
100 m breaststroke SB13	Prue Watt; Australia	Elena Krawzow; Germany	Kelley Becherer; United States
100 m breaststroke SB14	Michelle Alonso Morales; Spain	Magda Toeters; Netherlands	Shu Hang Leung; Hong Kong
50 m butterfly S5	Sarah Louise Rung; Norway	Teresa Perales; Spain	Joana Maria Silva; Brazil
50 m butterfly S6	Oksana Khrul; Ukraine	Dong Lu; China	Fuying Jiang; China
50 m butterfly S7	Jacqueline Freney; Australia	Brianna Nelson; Canada	Min Huang; China
100 m butterfly S8	Jessica Long; United States	Kateryna Istomina; Ukraine	Shengnan Jiang; China
100 m butterfly S9	Natalie du Toit; South Africa	Sarai Gascón Moreno; Spain	Elizabeth Stone; United States
100 m butterfly S10	Sophie Pascoe; New Zealand	Oliwia Jablonska; Poland	Elodie Lorandi; France
100 m butterfly S12	Joanna Mendak; Poland	Darya Stukalova; Russia	Hannah Russell; Great Britain
200 m individual medley SM5	Nataliia Prologaieva; Ukraine	Sarah Louise Rung; Norway	Teresa Perales; Spain
200 m individual medley SM6	Eleanor Simmonds; Great Britain	Verena Schott; Germany	Natalie Jones; Great Britain
200 m individual medley SM7	Jacqueline Freney; Australia	Brianna Nelson; Canada	Min Huang; China
200 m individual medley SM8	Jessica Long; United States	Olesya Vladykina; Russia	Shengnan Jiang; China
200 m individual medley SM9	Natalie du Toit; South Africa	Stephanie Millward; Great Britain	Louise Watkin; Great Britain
200 m individual medley SM10	Sophie Pascoe; New Zealand	Summer Ashley Mortimer; Canada	Meng Zhang; China
200 m individual medley SM11	Mary Fisher; New Zealand	Daniela Schulte; Germany	Amber Thomas; Canada
200 m individual medley SM12	Oxana Savchenko; Russia	Natali Pronina; Azerbaijan	Darya Stukalova; Russia
200 m individual medley SM13	Valerie Grand-Maison; Canada	Rebecca Anne Meyers; United States	Kelley Becherer; United States
4×100 m freestyle 34pts	Australia (AUS); Ellie Cole; Maddison Elliott; Katherine Downie; Jacqueline Freney	United States (USA); Susan Beth Scott; Victoria Arlen; Jessica Long; Anna Eames	Great Britain (GBR); Stephanie Millward; Claire Cashmore; Susannah Rodgers; Louise Watkin
4×100 m medley 34pts	Australia (AUS); Ellie Cole; Katherine Downie; Annabelle Williams; Jacqueline Freney	Great Britain (GBR); Heather Frederiksen; Claire Cashmore; Stephanie Millward; Louise Watkin	United States (USA); Susan Beth Scott; Anna Johannes; Jessica Long; Mallory Weggemann

== Table tennis ==
=== Men's events ===
Event	Gold	Silver	Bronze
Men's Individual – Class 1	Holger Nikelis; Germany	Jean-François Ducay; France	Paul Davies; Great Britain
Men's Individual – Class 2	Ján Riapoš; Slovakia	Kyung-Mook Kim; South Korea	Fabien Lamirault; France
Men's Individual – Class 3	Panfeng Feng; China	Zlatko Kesler; Serbia	Thomas Schmidberger; Germany
Men's Individual – Class 4	Kim Young-Gun; South Korea	Yan Zhang; China	Sameh Saleh; Egypt
Men's Individual – Class 5	Tommy Urhaug; Norway	Ningning Cao; China	Eun-Chang Jung; South Korea
Men's Individual – Class 6	Rungroj Thainiyom; Thailand	Álvaro Valera; Spain	Peter Rosenmeier; Denmark
Men's Individual – Class 7	Jochen Wollmert; Germany	Will Bayley; Great Britain	Mykhaylo Popov; Ukraine
Men's Individual – Class 8	Zhao Shuai; China	Richard Csejtey; Slovakia	Emil Andersson; Sweden
Men's Individual – Class 9	Ma Lin; China	Stanislaw Fraczyk; Austria	Gerben Last; Netherlands
Men's Individual – Class 10	Patryk Chojnowski; Poland	Yang Ge; China	David Jacobs; Indonesia
Men's Individual – Class 11	Péter Pálos; Hungary	Son Byeong-jun; South Korea	Pascal Pereira-Leal; France
Men's Team Class 1–2	Slovakia (SVK); Ján Riapoš; Martin Ludrovský; Rastislav Revúcky	France (FRA); Vincent Boury; Fabien Lamirault; Stephane Molliens	South Korea (KOR); Kim Kong Yong; Kim Min-gyu; Kim Kyung Mook; Lee Chang-ho
Men's Team – Class 3	China (CHN); Panfeng Feng; Zhao Ping; Gao Yanming	Germany (GER); Thomas Schmidberger; Jan Guertler; Thomas Bruechle; Holger Nikelis	France (FRA); Yann Guilhem; Florian Merrien; Jean-Philippe Robin
Men's Team – Class 4–5	China (CHN); Cao Ningning; Zhang Yan; Guo Xingyuan	South Korea (KOR); Jung Eun Chang; Kim Young Gun; Choi Il Sang; Kim Jung Gil	France (FRA); Maxime Thomas; Gregory Rosec; Nicolas Savant-Aira; Èmeric Martin
Men's Team – Class 6–8	Poland (POL); Piotr Grudzień; Marcin Skrzynecki	Spain (ESP); Álvaro Valera; Jordi Morales	Great Britain (GBR); Ross Wilson; Will Bayley; Aaron McKibbin
Men's Team – Class 9–10	China (CHN); Ma Lin; Ge Yang	Poland (POL); Patryk Chojnowski; Sebastian Powroźniak	Spain (ESP); Jorge Cardona; José Manuel Ruiz Reyes

=== Women's events ===
Event	Gold	Silver	Bronze
Women's Individual – Class 1-2	Jing Liu; China	Pamela Pezzutto; Italy	Isabelle Lafaye-Marziou; France
Women's Individual – Class 3	Anna-Carin Ahlquist; Sweden	Doris Mader; Austria	Alena Kánová; Slovakia
Women's Individual – Class 4	Zhou Ying; China	Borislava Perić; Serbia	Sung-Hye Moon; South Korea
Women's Individual – Class 5	Bian Zhang; China	Gai Gu; China	Ingela Lundbäck; Sweden
Women's Individual – Class 6	Raisa Chebanika; Russia	Antonina Khodzynska; Ukraine	Yuliya Klymenko; Ukraine
Women's Individual – Class 7	Kelly van Zon; Netherlands	Yulia Ovsyannikova; Russia	Viktoriia Safonova; Ukraine
Women's Individual – Class 8	Jingdian Mao; China	Thu Kamkasomphou; France	Josefin Abrahamsson; Sweden
Women's Individual – Class 9	Lina Lei; China	Neslihan Kavas; Turkey	Liu Meili; China
Women's Individual – Class 10	Natalia Partyka; Poland	Qian Yang; China	Fan Lei; China
Women's Individual – Class 11	Wong Ka Man; Hong Kong	Yeung Chi Ka; Hong Kong	Anzhelika Kosacheva; Russia
Women's Team – Class 1–3	China (CHN); Liu Jing; Li Qian	South Korea (KOR); Cho Kyoung Hee; Choi Hyun Ja; Jung Sang Sook	Great Britain (GBR); Jane Campbell; Sara Head
Women's Team – Class 4–5	China (CHN); Gu Gai; Zhang Bian; Zhang Miao; Zhou Ying	Sweden (SWE); Anna-Carin Ahlquist; Ingela Lundbäck	South Korea (KOR); Jung Ji Nam; Jung Young-A; Moon Sung Hye
Women's Team – Class 6–10	China (CHN); Fan Lei; Lei Lina; Liu Meili; Yang Qian	Turkey (TUR); Ümran Ertiş; Neslihan Kavas; Kübra Öçsoy	Poland (POL); Alicja Eigner; Malgorzata Jankowska; Natalia Partyka; Karolina Pek

== Volleyball ==
Event	Gold	Silver	Bronze
Men's team	Bosnia and Herzegovina (BIH); Ismet Godinjak; Adnan Manko; Adnan Kesmer; Asim Medić; Mirzet Duran; Nizam Čančar; Dževad Hamzić; Benis Kadrić; Safet Alibašić; Sabahudin Delalić (captain); Ermin Jusufović; Coach: Mirza Hrustemović	Iran (IRI); Majid Lashgarisanami; Reza Peidayesh; Davood Alipourian; Ahmad Eiri; Naser Hassanpour Alinazari; Sadegh Bigdeli; Jalil Eimery (captain); Seyedsaeid Ebrahimibaladezaei; Isa Zirahi; Ramezan Salehi Hajikolaei; Mohammad Khaleghi; Coach: Hadi Rezaeigarkani	Germany (GER); Alexander Schiffler; Thomas Renger; Stefan Haehnlein; Sebastian Czpakowski; Heiko Wiesenthal; Peter Schlorf; Jürgen Schrapp (captain); Christoph Herzog; Barbaros Sayilir; Torben Schiewe; Coach: Rudolf Sonnenbichler
Women's team	China (CHN); Tang Xue Mei; Lu Hong Qin (captain); Tan Yanhua; Su Li Mei; Zheng Xiong Ying; Wang Yanan; Li Liping; Zhang Xu Fei; Yang Yan Ling; Zhang Lijun; Sheng Yu Hong; Coach: Zhang Jun	United States (USA); Lora Webster; Brenda Maymon; Michelle Gerlosky; Kathryn Holloway; Heather Erickson; Monique Burkland; Kari Miller; Allison Aldrich; Nichole Millage; Kaleo Kanahele; Kendra Lancaster (captain); Coach: William Hamiter	Ukraine (UKR); Margaryta Pryvalykhina; Anzhelika Churkina (captain); Larysa Sinchuk; Galyna Kuznetsova; Olena Manankova; Ilona Yudina; Larysa Klochkova; Olga Shatylo; Larysa Ponomarenko; Valentyna Brik; Coach: Viktor Tymoshenko

== Wheelchair basketball ==
Event	Gold	Silver	Bronze
Men	Canada (CAN); Dave Durepos; Yvon Rouillard; Bo Hedges; Richard Peter; Joey Johnson; Adam Lancia; Abdi Dini; Chad Jassman; Patrick Anderson; Brandon Wagner; Tyler Miller; David Eng (captain); Coach: Jerry Tonello	Australia (AUS); Justin Eveson; Bill Latham; Brett Stibners; Shaun Norris; Michael Hartnett; Tristan Knowles; Jannik Blair; Tige Simmons; Grant Mizens; Dylan Alcott; Nick Taylor; Brad Ness (captain); Coach: Ben Ettridge	United States (USA); Eric Barber; Joseph Chambers; Jeremy Lade; Joshua Turek; Trevon Jenifer; William Waller (captain); Matt Scott; Steven Serio; Jason Nelms; Ian Lynch; Paul Schulte; Nate Hinze; Coach: Jim Glatch
Women	Germany (GER); Mareike Adermann; Johanna Welin; Britt Dillmann; Edina Müller; Annika Zeyen; Maria Kühn; Gesche Schünemann; Maya Lindholm; Annabel Breuer; Annegret Briessmann; Marina Mohnen (captain); Heike Friedrich; Coach: Holger Glinicki	Australia (AUS); Sarah Vinci; Cobi Crispin; Bridie Kean (captain); Amanda Carter; Tina McKenzie; Leanne del Toso; Clare Nott; Kylie Gauci; Shelley Chaplin; Sarah Stewart; Katie Hill; Amber Merritt; Coach: John Triscari	Netherlands (NED); Inge Huitzing; Lucie Houwen; Jitske Visser; Roos Oosterbaan; Sanne Timmerman; Petra Garnier; Miranda Wevers; Cher Korver (captain); Saskia Pronk; Barbara van Bergen; Carolina de Rooij-Versloot; Mariska Beijer; Coach: Gertjan van der Linden

== Wheelchair fencing ==
=== Men's events ===
Event	Gold	Silver	Bronze
Men's Épée A	Dariusz Pender; Poland	Romain Noble; France	Matteo Betti; Italy
Men's Épée B	Jovane Silva Guissone; Brazil	Chik Sum Tam; Hong Kong	Alim Latrèche; France
Men's Foil A	Yijun Chen; China	Ruyi Ye; China	Richárd Osváth; Hungary
Men's Foil B	Daoliang Hu; China	Anton Datsko; Ukraine	Alim Latrèche; France
Men's Sabre A	Yijun Chen; China	Jianquan Tian; China	Chan Wing Kin; Hong Kong
Men's Sabre B	Grzegorz Pluta; Poland	Marc André Cratère; France	Alessio Sarri; Italy
Men's Team Open	China (CHN); Chen Yijun; Ye Ruyi; Hu Daoliang	France (FRA); Ludovic Lemoine; Alim Latrèche; Damien Tokatlian	Hong Kong (HKG); Wong Tang Kat; Chan Wing Kin; Chung Ting Ching

=== Women's events ===
Event	Gold	Silver	Bronze
Women's Épée A	Yu Chui Yee; Hong Kong	Zsuzsanna Krajnyák; Hungary	Wu Baili; China
Women's Épée B	Saysunee Jana; Thailand	Simone Briese-Baetke; Germany	Chan Yui Chong; Hong Kong
Women's Foil A	Yu Chui Yee; Hong Kong	Wu Baili; China	Zsuzsanna Krajnyák; Hungary
Women's Foil B	Fang Yao; China	Gyöngyi Dani; Hungary	Marta Makowska; Poland
Women's Team Open	China (CHN); Rong Jing; Yao Fang; Wu Baili	Hungary (HUN); Veronika Juhász; Zsuzsanna Krajnyák; Gyöngyi Dani	Hong Kong (HKG); Fan Pui Shan; Yu Chui Yee; Chan Yui Chong

== Wheelchair rugby ==
Event	Gold	Silver	Bronze
Mixed team	Australia (AUS); Ben Newton; Nazim Erdem; Ryley Batt; Josh Hose; Jason Lees; Cody Meakin; Greg Smith; Chris Bond; Ryan Scott (captain); Cameron Carr; Andrew Harrison; Coach: Brad Dubberley	Canada (CAN); Jason Crone; Patrice Dagenais; Garett Hickling; Ian Chan; Mike Whitehead; Trevor Hirschfield; Fabien Lavoie; Travis Murao; Jared Funk; David Willsie (captain); Patrice Simard; Zak Madell; Coach: Kevin Orr	United States (USA); Chance Sumner; Seth McBride; Adam Scaturro; Chuck Aoki; Jason Regier; Scott Hogsett; Nick Springer; Will Groulx (captain); Andy Cohn; Chad Cohn; Derrick Helton; Joe Delagrave; Coach: James Gumbert

== Wheelchair tennis ==
Event	Gold	Silver	Bronze
Men's singles	Shingo Kunieda; Japan	Stéphane Houdet; France	Ronald Vink; Netherlands
Men's doubles	Sweden (SWE); Stefan Olsson; Peter Vikström	France (FRA); Frédéric Cattanéo; Nicolas Peifer	France (FRA); Stéphane Houdet; Michaël Jérémiasz
Women's singles	Esther Vergeer; Netherlands	Aniek van Koot; Netherlands	Jiske Griffioen; Netherlands
Women's doubles	Netherlands (NED); Marjolein Buis; Esther Vergeer	Netherlands (NED); Jiske Griffioen; Aniek van Koot	Great Britain (GBR); Lucy Shuker; Jordanne Whiley
Quad singles	Noam Gershony; Israel	David Wagner; United States	Nicholas Taylor; United States
Quad doubles	United States (USA); Nicholas Taylor; David Wagner	Great Britain (GBR); Andrew Lapthorne; Peter Norfolk	Israel (ISR); Noam Gershony; Shraga Weinberg
