= Larysa =

Larysa is a given name. Notable people with the surname include:

- Larysa Artiugina (born 1971), Ukrainian documentary film director and activist
- Larysa Berezhna (born 1961), Ukrainian long jumper
- Larysa Harapyn, Canadian media personality
- Larysa Hienijuš (1910–1983), Belarusian poet, writer and active participant of the national movement
- Larysa Karlova (born 1958), Ukrainian handball player
- Larysa Khorolets (born 1948), Ukrainian actress
- Larysa Klochkova, Ukrainian Paralympic volleyball player
- Larysa Kondracki, Canadian producer, director and screenwriter
- Larysa Kuzmenko (born 1956), Canadian composer and pianist
- Larysa Ponomarenko, Ukrainian Paralympic volleyball player
- Larysa Sinchuk (born 1965), Ukrainian Paralympic volleyball player
- Larysa Varona (born 1983), Belarusian female cross-country skier, biathlete and rower
- Larysa Zaspa (born 1971), Ukrainian handball goalkeeper
