= Klochkov (surname) =

Klochkov, feminine: Klochkova is a Russian surname. Notable people with the surname include:

- Larysa Klochkova (born 1970), Ukrainian Paralympic volleyball player
- Vladislav Klochkov (born 1978), Belarusian hockey player
- Yana Klochkova (born 1982), Ukrainian Olympic swimmer
- Yuri Klochkov (born 1998), Russian football player
