= Paula Herts =

Brazilian sitting volleyball player (born 1974)

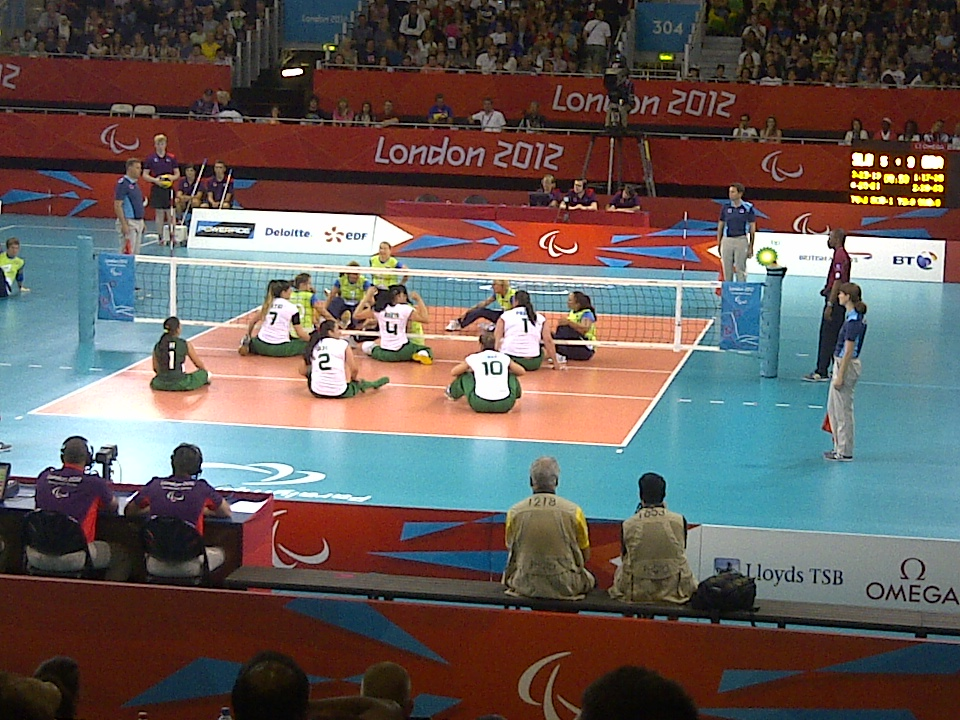
- Herts (#1) at the 2012 Summer Paralympics

Personal information
- Nationality: Brazilian
- Born: 21 July 1974 (age 52)

Volleyball information
- Number: 1

Career
Years	Teams
2012	(Brazil) Add

National team
2012	Brazil sitting volleyball team
Honours
Representing Brazil
Paralympic Games
Bronze medal – third place	2016 Rio	Team

Paula Herts (born 21 July 1974) is a Brazilian Paralympic sitting volleyball player. She is part of the Brazil women's national sitting volleyball team.

She competed at the 2012 Summer Paralympics finishing 5th, 2015 Parapan American Games, and 2016 Summer Paralympics.

On club level she played for Add in 2012.

== See also ==
- Brazil at the 2012 Summer Paralympics
- Brazil at the 2016 Summer Paralympics
