= Ana Paula Alves =

Brazilian sitting volleyball player (born 1970)

Personal information
- Nationality: Brazilian
- Born: 17 November 1970 (age 55)

Volleyball information
- Number: 6

Career
Years	Teams
2012	(Brazil) Sesi

National team
2012	Brazil sitting volleyball team

Ana Paula Alves (born 17 November 1970) is a Brazilian female Paralympic sitting volleyball player. She is part of the Brazil women's national sitting volleyball team.

She competed at the 2012 Summer Paralympics finishing 5th. On club level she played for Sesi in 2012.

== See also ==
- Brazil at the 2012 Summer Paralympics
