= Aderlandi Silva =

Brazilian sitting volleyball player (born 1976)

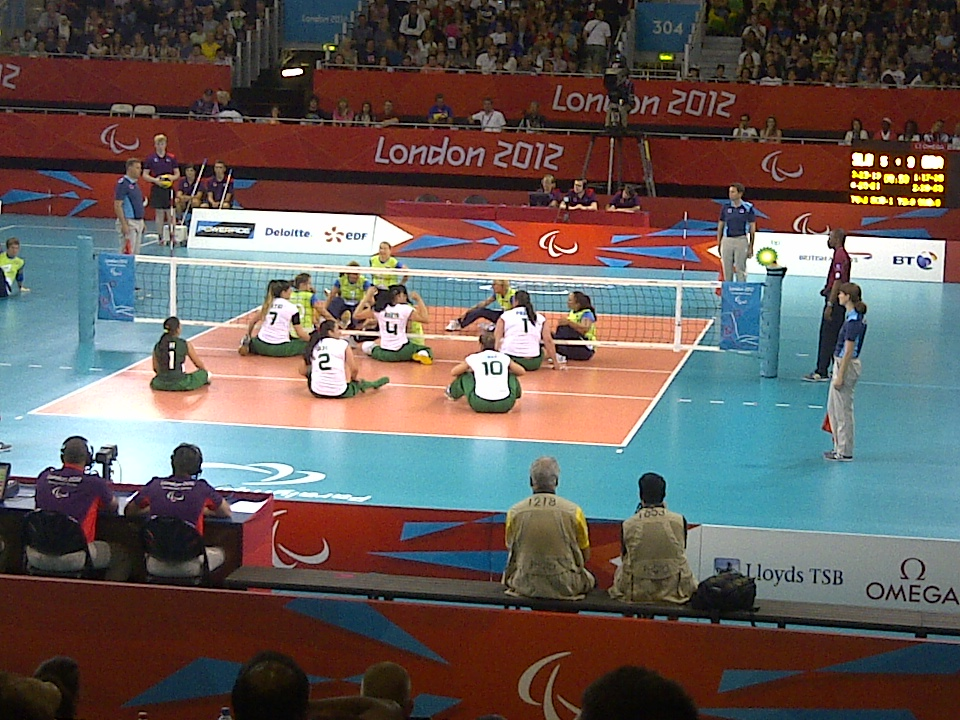
- Silva (#2) at the 2012 Summer Paralympics

Personal information
- Nationality: Brazilian
- Born: 4 July 1976 (age 50)

Volleyball information
- Number: 2

Career
Years	Teams
2012	(Brazil) Sesi

National team
2012	Brazil sitting volleyball team

Aderlandi Silva (born 4 July 1976) is a Brazilian Paralympic sitting volleyball player. She is part of the Brazil women's national sitting volleyball team.

She competed at the 2012 Summer Paralympics, finishing 5th. At club level she played for Sesi in 2012.

== See also ==
- Brazil at the 2012 Summer Paralympics
