= Claire Harvey =

British Paralympic athlete (born 1974)

Personal information
- Nationality: Great Britain
- Born: 19 February 1974 (age 52)

Career
| Years | Teams |
|---|---|
| 2012 | (United Kingdom) London Lynx |
| 2015 | (United Kingdom) Ashford AC |

National team
| 2012 | (United Kingdom) Great Britain sitting volleyball team |

Claire Harvey
Sport
- Sport: Athletics
- Events: Discus, Javelin
- Coached by: None

Claire Harvey (born 19 February 1974) is a British Paralympic sportsperson. She began as a sitting volleyball player, before switching to track and field athletics where she competes in F55 classification throwing events.

== Sitting volleyball career ==
Harvey was part of the Great Britain women's national sitting volleyball team and is now a track and field athlete for Great Britain. She competed at the 2012 Summer Paralympics where the team finished last. On club level, she played for London Lynx in 2012.

== Athletics career ==
In 2015, Harvey switched sports to compete in track and field athletics. She competed at the 2015 IPC Athletics World Championships in Doha where she came fourth in the shot put and eighth in the javelin throw. Although Harvey qualified in the discus for the Great Britain team for the 2016 Summer Paralympics in Rio, she was forced to withdraw from the team due to injury.

== See also ==
- Great Britain at the 2012 Summer Paralympics
