= Amy Brierly =

British sitting volleyball player (born 1989)

Personal information
- Full name: Amy Latitia Brierly
- Nationality: Great Britain
- Born: 30 September 1989 (age 37)

Volleyball information
- Number: 8

Career
Years	Teams
2012	(United Kingdom) FDSW Celtic Dragons

National team
2012	(United Kingdom) Great Britain sitting volleyball team

Amy Brierly (born 30 September 1989) is a British female Paralympic sitting volleyball player. She is part of the Great Britain women's national sitting volleyball team.

She competed at the 2012 Summer Paralympics. On club level she played for FDSW Celtic Dragons in 2012.

== See also ==
- Great Britain at the 2012 Summer Paralympics
