= Andrea Green (sitting volleyball) =

British sitting volleyball player (born 1970)

Personal information
- Nationality: Great Britain
- Born: 29 May 1970 (age 56)

Volleyball information
- Number: 5

Career
Years	Teams
2012	(United Kingdom) Loughborough Lions

National team
2012	(United Kingdom) Great Britain sitting volleyball team

Andrea Green (born 29 May 1970) is a British female Paralympic sitting volleyball player. She is part of the Great Britain women's national sitting volleyball team.

She competed at the 2012 Summer Paralympics finishing 7th. On club level she played for Loughborough Lions in 2012.

== See also ==
- Great Britain at the 2012 Summer Paralympics
