= Larysa Artiugina =

Ukrainian documentary film maker

Larysa Mykhailivna Artyugina
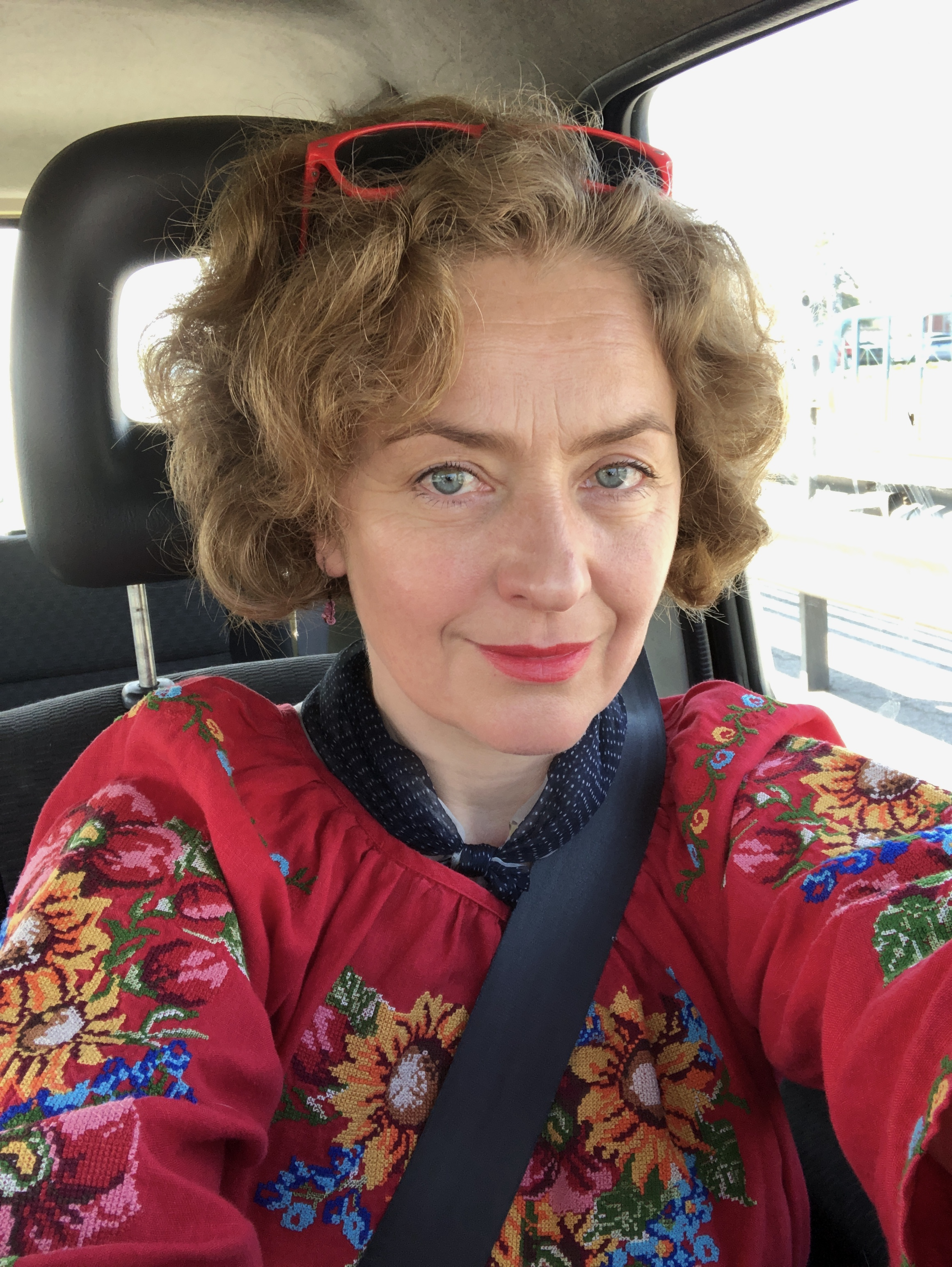
- Born: 23 May 1971 (age 55); Vinnytsia, Ukraine
- Education: Taras Shevchenko National University of Kyiv; Kyiv National I. K. Karpenko-Kary Theatre, Cinema and Television University
- Occupations: Documentary film director, activist

Larysa Mykhailivna Artyugina (born 23 May 1971) is a Ukrainian documentary film director and activist. She is a member of the Union of Cinematographers of Ukraine, the Union of Theater Actors of Ukraine, the creative association Babylon'13 and the Assembly of Cultural Figures of Ukraine. She also heads the public organization New Donbas NGO and produces work on the docUA Platform of Ukrainian Documentaries.

== Biography ==
Artiugina was born in 1971 in Vinnytsia, Ukraine. In 1993 she graduated from Taras Shevchenko National University of Kyiv, with a major in applied nuclear physics. In 1999 she graduated from Kyiv National I. K. Karpenko-Kary Theatre, Cinema and Television University (KNUTKT), Department of Television Directing as a director, journalist and camera operator. In 2006 she graduated from the Hollywood School in Kyiv. Richard Crevolin's writing studio, Barry Primus' acting studio, Larry Kostroff's production.

In 2007 she completed an internship under the International Visitor Leadership Program of the US State Department "Film as a Reflection of National Identity" and 2008–2015 she returned to teach at KNUTKT, where with a colleague, she coordinated the second-year undergraduates, future documentary filmmakers and said during an interview.

We decided to give them a task – to shoot about the Maidan. They had such a chance – that of filming history. We asked them to inform us every time they were going off to the Maidan. Later, I would greatly worry about them, especially during the days of mass killing. However, I realized that they were already independent filmmakers, and it was their own decision to shoot there – I could not influence it.

After the Maidan Revolution, the body of work that the students created "gained renown as a series of documentaries called Black Diary of the Maidan."

=== Activism ===
As is a founder of the New Donbas NGO, Artiugina began organizing reconciliation projects for people from Donbas, primarily for school students in 2014. She also was involved in creating documentaries about the Euromaidan Revolution of Dignity and later shot her own film – “How We Became Military Volunteers” – about the Donbas battalion soldiers. She also created “Bohdan’s Happiness” telling the story about the war's beginning in Eastern Ukraine through the eyes of a six-year-old boy.

When she joined Euromaidan, at its very start, she wanted to protect her friend Yehor Soboliev, who at the time was a journalist and activist and became a member of the Ukrainian parliament. To do so, she shot a film about him so that there would be substantial evidence if anything happens to him.

In June 2018, she joined in an open letter from cultural figures, politicians and human rights activists calling on the world's leaders to defend Ukrainian prisoner director Oleh Sentsov and other political prisoners.

== Selected works ==
- 2019: University Without Borders Project, project manager.
- Project "School of Documentary and Media in Lithuania for Teenagers Affected by the War."
- Project "docUA Platform." project manager.
- Project "Lithuanian experience for Ukraine - new opportunities for cooperation with the EU," partner and trainer.
- 2018: Project "Habilitation of children affected by the war with the help of cultural, historical, educational and art studies," project manager.
- 2017: Project "Adaptation of IDPs and child victims through the development of communication culture skills", project manager. Project "Summer Tab Diversity," project manager.
- 2016: "Summer Peace Film Camp" for the affected children, in which they made their first films. Project manager and lecturer.
- 2015: Ukrainian Independent Initiative "Platform of Ukrainian Documentary," project manager, film director and producer. Selected filmography (documentaries): "Dad" director producer 2019 "How we became volunteers," directed by L. Artyugin 2015 "Bogdan's Happiness," directed by L. Artyugin 2015 "Collective Red" directed by L. Artyugin 2000.
- Cultural Initiative "Assembly of Cultural Figures of Ukraine," co-founder.
- 2013: Creative Association "BABYLON 13" - Ukrainian public protest union of directors, co-founder and director. Documentary film " Stronger than a weapon," co-director.
- 2012: Short comedy "Yellow Flower for Monsieur Burion," directed by Ukraine-France, who participated in the 66th Cannes Film Festival (Short Film Corner section).
- 2011: Short film "GMO-free", screenwriter and director, from the almanac "Ukraine, Goodbye!"

=== Selected filmography ===
- 2006 - feature film "Las Meninas," second director, produced by MF Film.
- 2007 - theatrical project "Merry Apocalypse," directed by actors.
- 2007 - anti-corruption video of social advertising, co-writer, director.
- 2007 - TV program "Unbeaten Way", director. Svit-TV production studio.
- 2007 - documentary TV program "Mosfilm," director. STB-production.
- 2008 - documentary TV program "Profession - swindler," director. Active-vision production studio.
- 2008 - a series of videos of socio-political advertising "Protect your city."
- 2009 - publicist film "Affair of Honor", director, producer. My Cinema Production Studio.
- 2010 - TV program "Secret", director, screenwriter. My Cinema Production Studio.
- 2011 - TV series "Obsessed," director. Department of Art and Documentary Projects of 1 + 1 TV Channel.
- 2012 - short film "GMO-free", part of the film anthology "Ukraine, Goodbye!"
- 2012 - short film "Yellow Flower for Monsieur Burion."
- 2014 - documentary "Avtomaidan" from the series of documentaries "Winter that changed us."
- 2015 - documentary film "How we became volunteers."
- 2019 - documentary " Dad. "

== Awards ==
- 1998 - International Film Forum of Slavic and Orthodox Peoples "Golden Knight" - the prize "Bronze Knight" awarded to the almanac "Workshop" for "Many Summers."
- 2001 - International Festival of TV programs and films on law enforcement "Golden George." Silver George Award in the nomination "Best Law Enforcement Documentary" for "A Place to Repent" (2000).
- 2002 - 6th Forum of Cinematographers of the CIS countries, Latvia, Lithuania and Estonia - project "Ukrainian ballads".
- 2003 - Enchanted Gum Film Festival - the first prize (named after O. Dovzhenko for the film "Birds").
- 2007 - DJUCE Mobile Film Festival, special prize for the film "Real Democracy."
