= Georgia Beikoff =

Australian Paralympic athlete (born 1993)

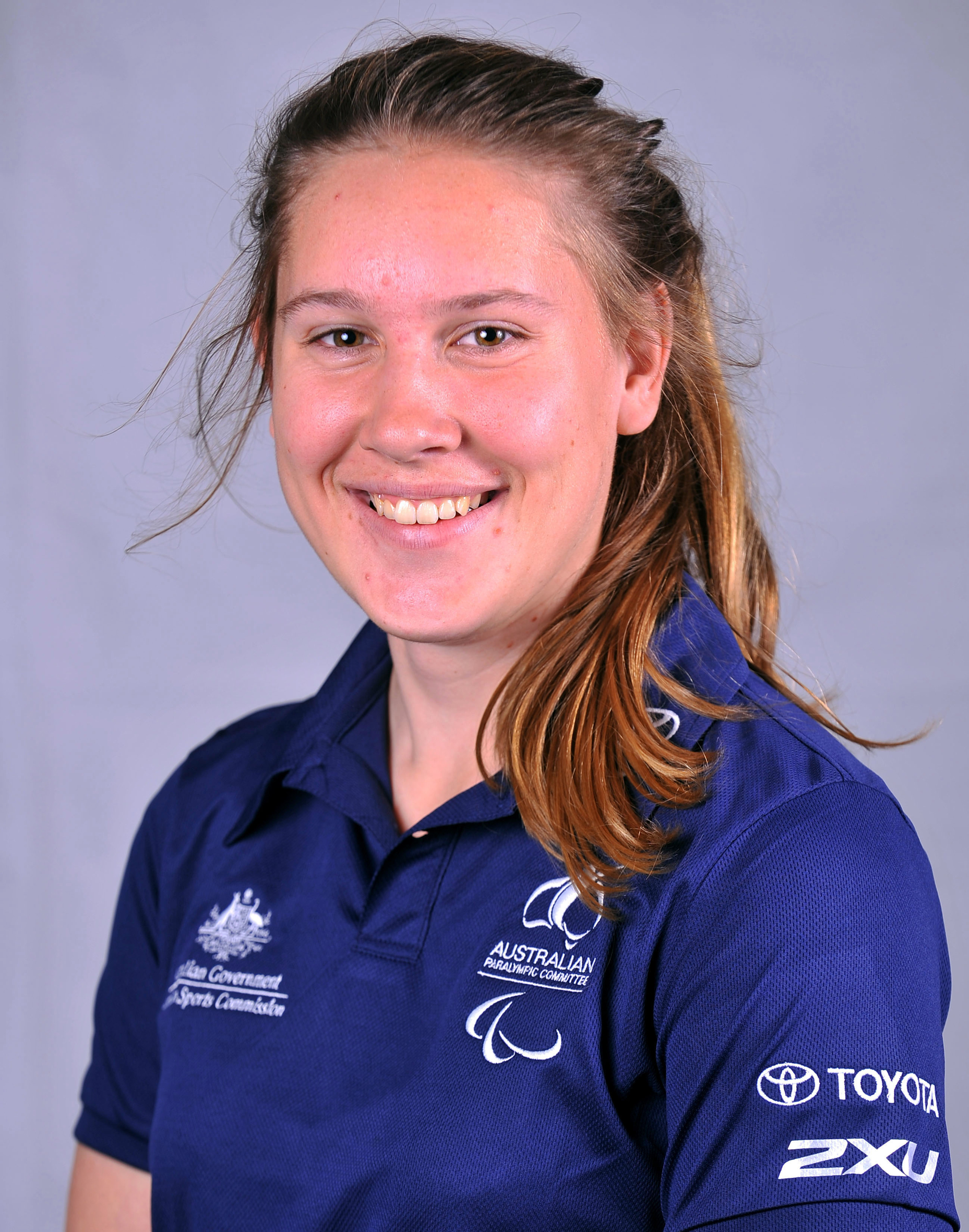
- 2012 Australian Paralympic team portrait of Beikoff

Personal information
- Full name: Georgia Kate Beikoff
- Nationality: Australian
- Born: 13 May 1993 (age 33) Wollongong, NSW, Australia
- Occupations: Paralympic Athlete, Teacher

Sport
- Country: Australia
- Sport: Athletics
- Event: Javelin

Achievements and titles
- Personal best: 29.84
Medal record
Athletics
Paralympic Games
Bronze medal – third place	2012 London	Women's Javelin Throw F37/38

Georgia Beikoff (born 13 May 1993) is an Australian Paralympic athletics competitor. At the 2012 Summer Paralympics, she won a bronze medal in the Women's Javelin Throw - F37/38.

== Personal ==
Beikoff was born on 13 May 1993, and is from Valentine, New South Wales. She graduated from St Philip's Christian College in 2011. As of 2012, she is a student.

Beikoff has mild cerebral palsy. She played cricket for the Newcastle Breakers, where she was a medium pace bowler. She was part of the New South Wales development cricket squad. She also played soccer for the Valentine Phoenix women's junior side. She quit both sports to pursue athletics.

Beikoff has operated as a teacher at Thomas Hassall Anglican College from Jan 2023 till Dec 2024, where she worked as the Assistant Chaplain.

== Athletics ==
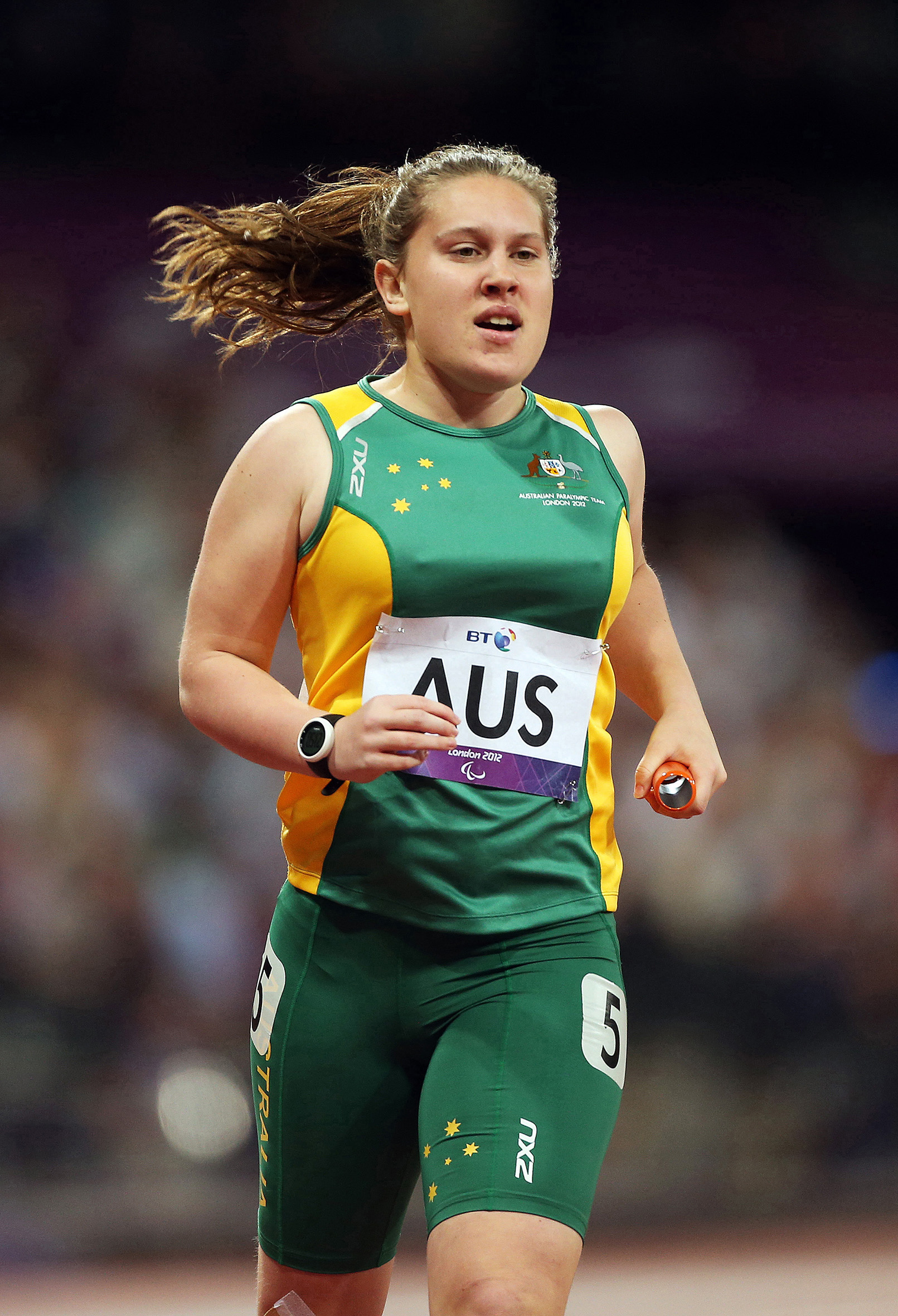
Beikoff at the 2012 London Paralympics

Beikoff is a T37 classified athletics competitor specialising in the T37–38 javelin and 4 x 100 metres T35–38 Women's Relay. She has an athletics scholarship with the New South Wales Institute of Sport. She started competing in 2008 after being identified at an Australian Paralympic Talent Search Day event.

Beikoff came in first in the javelin at the 2010 Australian National Athletics Championships. At the 2011 Sydney Track Classic, she finished 4th in the 100 metre event with a time of 15.44 seconds. At the 2011 IAAF Melbourne Track Classic, she finished third in the 100 metre event with a time of 15.42. At the 2011 Australian Athletics Championships, she finished second in the 100 metre event and fourth in the javelin event with a distance of 23.92 metres. She first represented Australia in 2011 at the IPC Athletics World Championships. At the event, she anchored Australia's 4 × 100 m relay team. Competing in the javelin event, she finished seventh out of thirteen. She competed at the 2012 Australian Athletics Championships in the women's javelin throw ambulant event, finishing third with a distance of 27.89 metres.

She was selected to represent Australia at the 2012 Summer Paralympics in athletics. Beikoff competed in the Women's Javelin T37–38 and the Women's 4 × 100 m T35–38 events. In the Javelin, she achieved a personal best on her first attempt of 29.84 metres, surprising herself with the result of a bronze

medal.[12]
