= Xue Lei =

Chinese Paralympic athlete

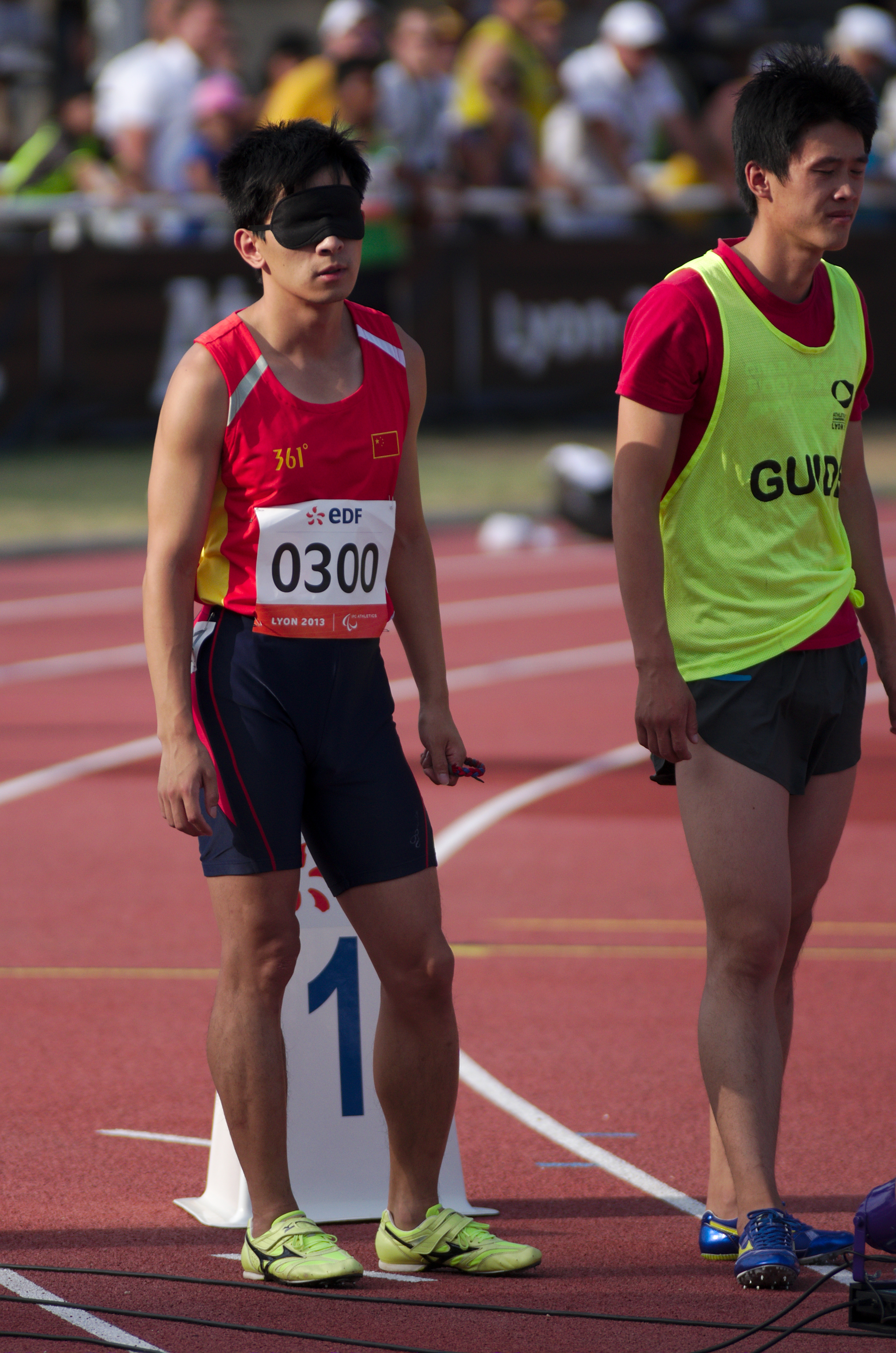
- 2013 IPC Athletics World Championships, Lei Xue and guide Lin Wan, Men's 100m – T11

Personal information
- Nationality: Chinese

Chinese name
- Chinese: 薛雷
- Hanyu Pinyin: Xuē Léi
Medal record
Track and field (athletics)
Representing China
Paralympic Games
Gold medal – first place	2012 London	100 metres – T11
Silver medal – second place	2012 London	4 × 100 metres relay – T11-T13

Xue Lei is a paralympic athlete from China competing mainly in category T11 sprint events.

Xue competed at the 2012 Paralympic Games in London where he could only manage fourth in his semifinal in the 200m. He managed to win the gold medal in the 100m and was part of the Chinese team that finished 0.02 seconds behind the gold medal-winning Russian team who broke the world record.
