= Olga Shatylo =

Ukrainian Paralympic volleyballer

Personal information
- Nationality: Ukraine
- Born: August 12, 1984 (age 42)
Honours
Women's sitting volleyball
Representing Ukraine
Paralympic Games
Bronze medal – third place	2012 London	Team

Olga Shatylo (born August 12, 1984) is a Ukrainian Paralympic volleyballist who won a bronze medal at the 2012 Summer Paralympics in sitting volleyball competition. She graduated from Kyiv Polytechnic Institute in Kyiv, Ukraine.
