= Michelle Gerlosky =

American Paralympic volleyball player (born 1983)

Personal information
- Full name: Michelle Denise Gerlosky
- Nationality: United States
- Born: March 20, 1983 (age 43); Lake Wales, Florida
- Height: 6 ft 0 in (1.83 m)
Medal record
Women's sitting volleyball
Representing United States
Paralympic Games
Silver medal – second place	2012 London	Team
Parapan American Zonal Championships
Gold medal – first place	2009 Denver, Colorado	Team
Parapan American Championship
Gold medal – first place	2010 Denver, Colorado	Team
WOVD World Cup
Gold medal – first place	2010 Port Said, Egypt	Team
WOVD World Championships
Silver medal – second place	2010 Edmonds, Oklahoma	Team
ECVD Continental Cup
Gold medal – first place	2011 Yevpatoria, Ukraine	Team
Volleyball Masters
Gold medal – first place	2012 Leersum, Netherlands	Team

Michelle Gerlosky (born March 20, 1983) is an American Paralympic volleyballist.

== Biography ==
Gerlosky was born in Lake Wales, Florida with her right hand and part of her forearm missing. She graduated from University of Georgia and received such honours as the Dean's List, Provost's List and with cum laude. She started competing for Paralympic Games in 2010 where she won one silver and two gold medals. The golds came from Parapan American Championship and the World Cup while the silver one was from World Championship. In 2011 and 2012 respectively she won two gold medals at ECVD Continental Cup which was held in Yevpatoria, Ukraine and Volleyball Masters. She also got another silver medal for her participation at 2012 Paralympic Games in London. In 2011, she was married to Alexander Schiffler who is also a sitting volleyball competitor.
