= Anzhelika Churkina =

Ukrainian volleyball player (born 1969)

Personal information
- Nationality: Ukrainian
- Born: 18 September 1969 (age 57)

Volleyball information
- Number: 2

National team
2012	Ukraine sitting volleyball team
Honours
Bronze medal – third place	2012 London	Team

Anzhelika Churkina (born 18 September 1969) is a Ukrainian Paralympic sitting volleyball player. She is part of the Ukraine women's national sitting volleyball team.

She competed at the 2012 Summer Paralympics, winning the bronze medal, after beating the Netherlands in the bronze medal match. She competed in the 2016 Summer Paralympics.

== See also ==
- Ukraine at the 2012 Summer Paralympics
