= Olena Manankova =

Ukrainian Paralympic volleyball player (born 1995)

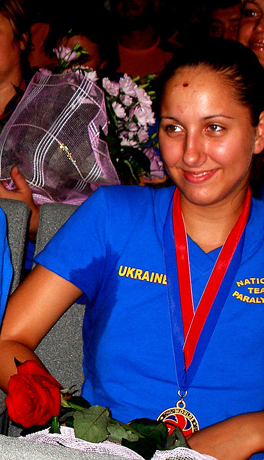

Personal information
- Nationality: Ukraine
- Born: 18 May 1995 (age 31)
Honours
Women's sitting volleyball
Representing Ukraine
Paralympic Games
Bronze medal – third place	2012 London	Team

Olena Manankova (born 18 May 1995) is a Ukrainian Paralympic volleyballist who won a bronze medal at the 2012 Summer Paralympics in sitting volleyball competition.
