= Kendra Lancaster =

American Paralympic volleyballist

Personal information
- Nationality: American
- Born: July 2, 1987 (age 39); Indianapolis, Indiana, U.S.
- Hometown: Westfield, Indiana, U.S.
- Height: 5 ft 7 in (170 cm)
Medal record
Women's sitting volleyball
Representing United States
Paralympic Games
Bronze medal – third place	2004 Athens	Team
Silver medal – second place	2008 Beijing	Team
Silver medal – second place	2012 London	Team
World Championships
Silver medal – second place	2010 Edmond, Oklahoma	Team

Kendra Lancaster (born July 2, 1987) is an American Paralympic volleyballist.

== Biography ==
Lancaster was born in Indianapolis, Indiana. She started competing for Paralympic Games in 2004 where she won a bronze medal for her participation at 2004 Paralympic Games in Athens, Greece. In 2008, she participated at 2008 Paralympics where she won a silver medal. In 2011 and 2012 respectively she won 2 more silver medals for Sitting Volleyball World Championships and for 2012 Paralympic Games in London.
