= Li Liping =

Chinese sitting volleyball player (born 1982)

Personal information
- Nationality: Chinese
- Born: 3 July 1982 (age 44); Shanghai, China

Volleyball information
- Number: 8
Honours
Women's sitting volleyball
Representing China
Paralympic Games
Gold medal – first place	2004 Athens	Team
Gold medal – first place	2008 Beijing	Team
Gold medal – first place	2012 London	Team
Silver medal – second place	2016 Rio	Team
Asian Para Games
Gold medal – first place	2010 Guangzhou	Team

Li Liping (Chinese: 李丽萍; pinyin: Lǐ Lì píng) (born 3 July 1982) is a Chinese female former Paralympic sitting volleyball player. She was a part of the China women's national sitting volleyball team.

She competed at the 2004 Summer Paralympics,2008 Summer Paralympics, 2012 Summer Paralympics winning the gold medal, and the 2016 Paralympic Games, winning the silver medal. On club level she played for Shanghai in 2012.
