= Valentyna Brik =

Ukrainian Paralympic volleyball player (born 1985)

Personal information
- Nationality: Ukraine
- Born: 31 August 1985 (age 41)
- Height: 1.87 m (6 ft 2 in)
- Weight: 76 kg (168 lb)
Honours
Women's sitting volleyball
Representing Ukraine
Paralympic Games
Bronze medal – third place	2012 London	Team

Valentyna Brik (born 31 August 1985) is a Ukrainian Paralympic volleyballist who won a bronze medal at the 2012 Summer Paralympics in sitting volleyball competition. She graduated from Zaporozhye National University in Zaporozhye, Ukraine with a degree in Physical Education.
