= Margaryta Pryvalykhina =

Ukrainian Paralympic volleyball player (born 1980)

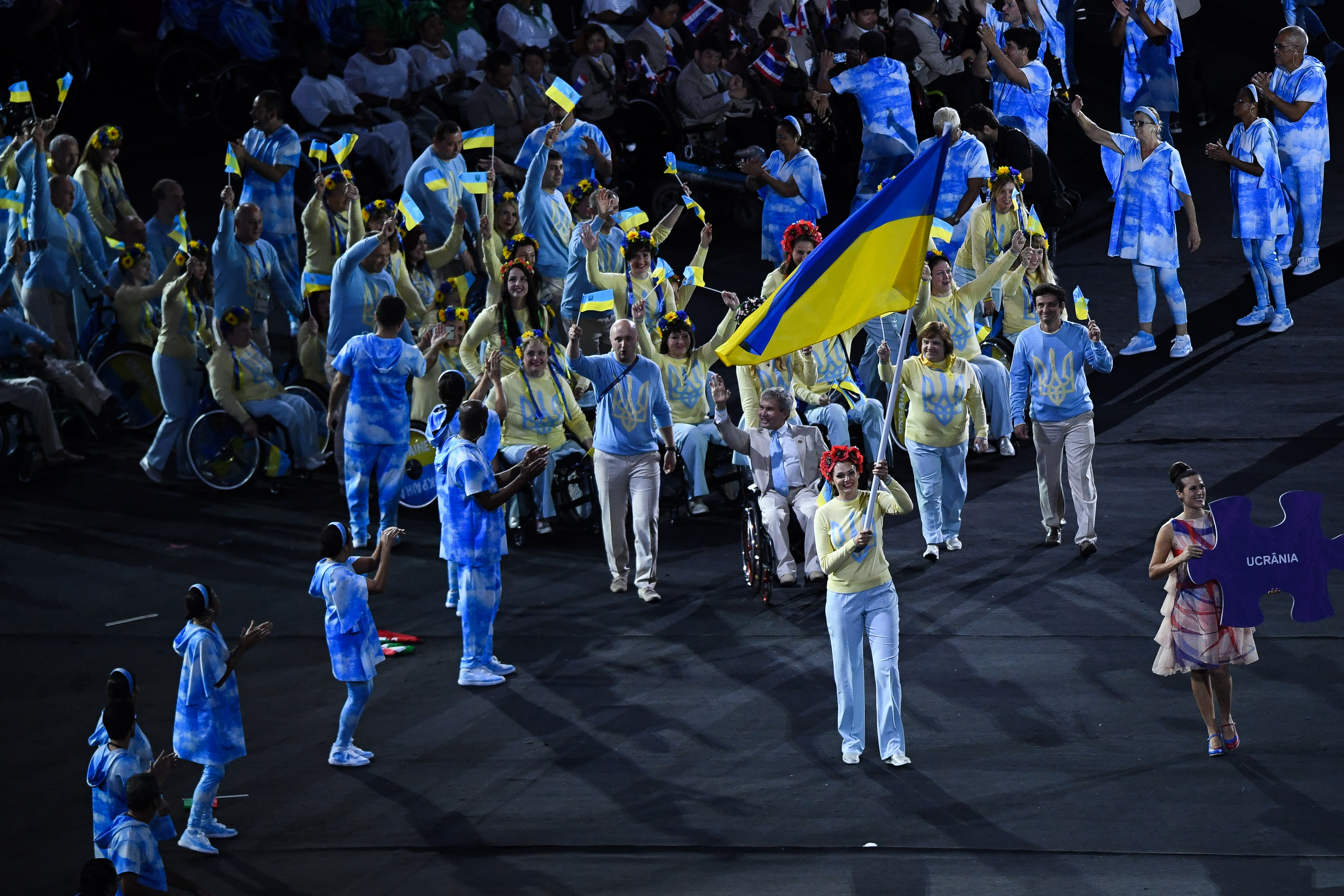

Personal information
- Nationality: Ukraine
- Born: May 9, 1980 (age 46)
Honours
Women's sitting volleyball
Representing Ukraine
Paralympic Games
Bronze medal – third place	2012 London	Team

Margaryta Pryvalykhina (born May 9, 1980) is a Ukrainian Paralympic volleyballist who won a bronze medal at the 2012 Summer Paralympics in sitting volleyball competition. She holds Master of Sport of International Class title.
