= Brenda Maymon-Jensen =

American sitting volleyball player (born 1985)

Personal information
- Full name: Brenda Michelle Jensen
- Nationality: American
- Born: Brenda Maymon; June 4, 1985 (age 41); New Albany, Indiana, U.S.
- Height: 5 ft 7 in (1.70 m)

Volleyball information
- Number: 3

National team
2004–2012	United States sitting volleyball team
Medal record
Women's sitting volleyball
Representing United States
Paralympic Games
Bronze medal – third place	2004 Athens	Team
Silver medal – second place	2008 Beijing	Team
Silver medal – second place	2012 London	Team

Brenda Maymon-Jensen (born June 4, 1985) is an American Paralympic sitting volleyball player. She is part of the United States women's national sitting volleyball team.

She competed at the 2004 Summer Paralympics (bronze medal), the 2008 Summer Paralympics (silver medal), and 2012 Summer Paralympics (silver medal).

== See also ==
- United States at the 2004 Summer Paralympics
- United States at the 2008 Summer Paralympics
- United States at the 2012 Summer Paralympics
