= Ilona Yudina =

Ukrainian sitting volleyball player

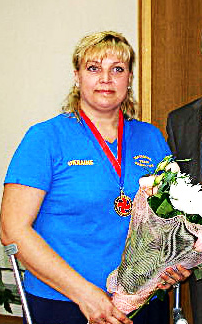

Personal information
- Nationality: Ukraine
- Born: 28 June 1984
- Died: 21 May 2018 (aged 33)
Honours
Women's sitting volleyball
Representing Ukraine
Paralympic Games
Bronze medal – third place	2012 London	Team

Ilona Yudina (28 June 1984 - 21 May 2018) was a Ukrainian Paralympic sitting volleyball player, master of sports of international class.

Yudina was a part of the Ukrainian women's national sitting volleyball team. She competed at the 2004 Summer Paralympics, 2008 Summer Paralympics, 2012 Summer Paralympics winning the bronze medal, 2016 Summer Paralympics, 2010 World Championships, and 2014 World Championships. She was involved in the volleyball section of the Dnipropetrovsk regional center "Invasport".

Ilona Yudina died of cancer on 21 May 2018 in Dnipro at the age of 33, as reported by the National Committee for Sports for the Disabled of Ukraine.
