= Larysa Ponomarenko =

Ukrainian Paralympic volleyball player

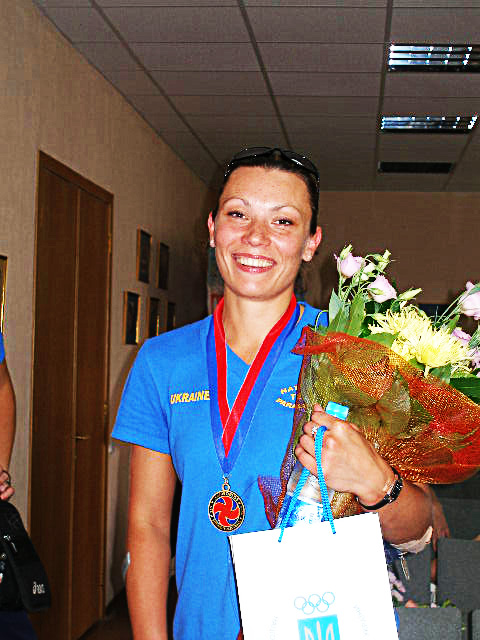

Personal information
- Nationality: Ukrainian

Sport
- Country: Ukraine
- Sport: Volleyball
Medal record
Paralympic Games
Bronze medal – third place	2012 London	Women's tournament

Larysa Ponomarenko is a Ukrainian Paralympic volleyball player.

Ponomarenko competed at the 2012 Paralympic Games where she won a bronze medal in the women's team event.
