= Larysa Sinchuk =

Ukrainian Paralympic volleyball player (born 1965)

Personal information
- Nationality: Ukraine
- Born: August 9, 1965 (age 61)
Honours
Women's sitting volleyball
Representing Ukraine
Paralympic Games
Bronze medal – third place	2012 London	Team
Deaflympics
Bronze medal – third place	1993 Sofia	Team
Silver medal – second place	1997 Copenhagen	Team
Bronze medal – third place	2001 Rome	Team
Gold medal – first place	2005 Melbourne	Team

Larysa Sinchuk (born August 9, 1965) is a Ukrainian Paralympic volleyballist who won two bronze medals for 1993 and 2001 sitting volleyball participation and won gold and silver for 1997 and 2005 competitions.
