= Larysa Klochkova =

Ukrainian volleyball player (born 1970)

Personal information
- Nationality: Ukrainian
- Born: April 15, 1970 (age 56)

Sport
- Country: Ukraine
- Sport: Volleyball
Medal record
Paralympic Games
Bronze medal – third place	2012 London	Women's tournament

Larysa Klochkova (born 15 April 1970) is a Ukrainian Paralympic volleyball player.

Klochkova won a bronze medal at the 2012 Paralympic Games in the women's team event. She also competed at the in 2008 and 2016 Paralympic Games.
