= Sitting volleyball at the 2012 Summer Paralympics =

Sitting volleyball at the XIV Paralympic Games
- Venue: ExCeL Exhibition Centre
- Dates: 30 August – 8 September 2012

Medalists
1st place, gold medalist(s)		Bosnia and Herzegovina (BIH) (men); China (CHN) (women)
2nd place, silver medalist(s)		Iran (IRI) (men); United States (USA) (women)
3rd place, bronze medalist(s)		Germany (GER) (men); Ukraine (UKR) (women)

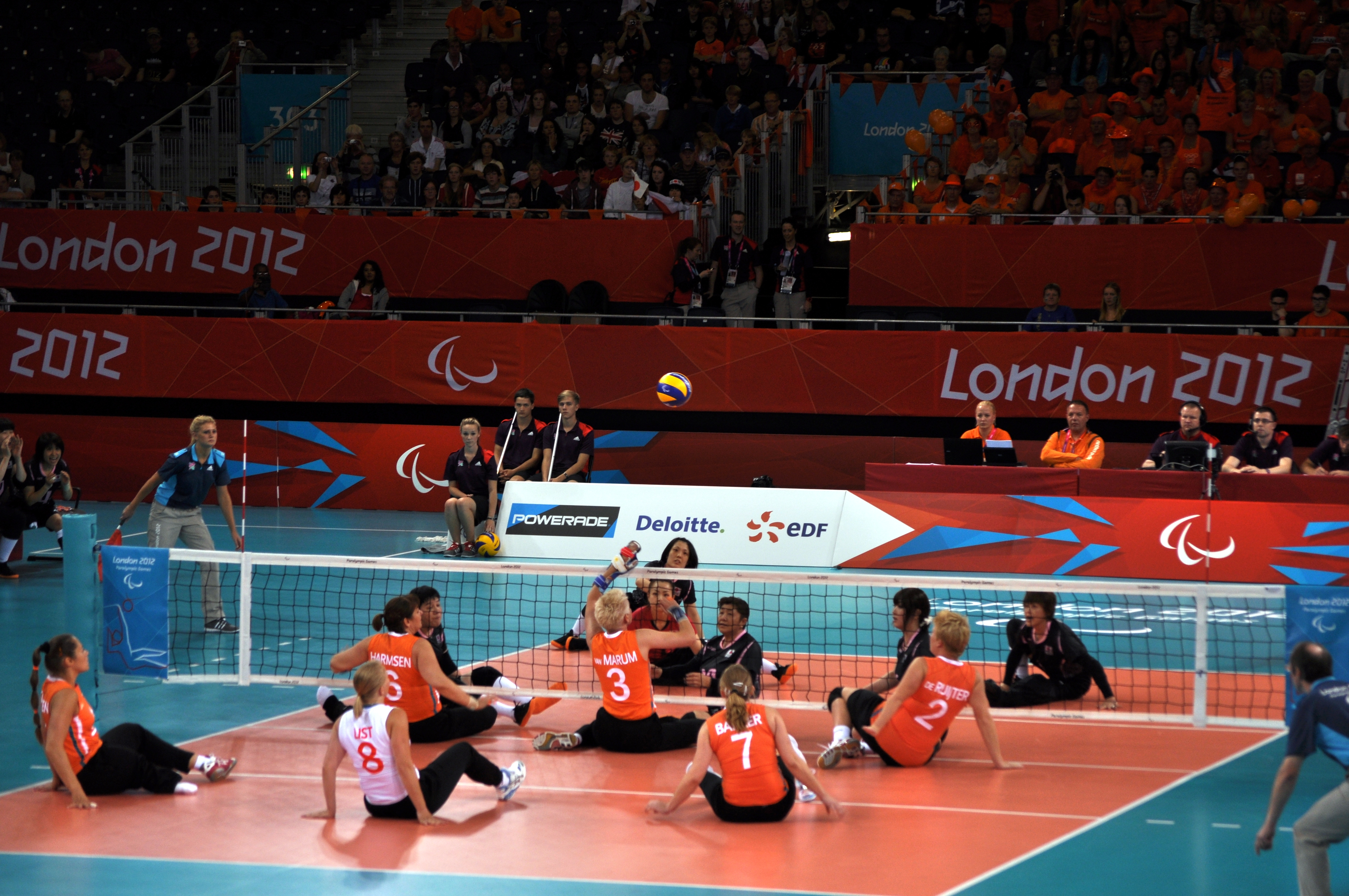
Netherlands versus Japan women's match

Sitting volleyball at the 2012 Summer Paralympics was held from 30 August to 8 September at the ExCeL Exhibition Centre in London. Two team events were held, one for men and one for women.

In the men's sitting event, Iran were the defending champions. Bosnia and Herzegovina and Iran were the finalists in 2000, 2004 and 2008, with Iran winning in 2000 and 2008 and Bosnia and Herzegovina in 2004. These two countries met once more in the final in Beijing, with Iran emerging victorious by 3–0. Egypt finished fourth in Beijing, beaten 2–3 by Russia, who took bronze. Bosnia and Herzegovina's men's team won the gold in 2012, beating Iran 3-1, although Iran had also won by 3–1 against them in the group stage.

The London Games marked the third time the women's sitting event was held. China were the defending champions. The Netherlands took silver, and the United States bronze, in 2004. In Beijing, China was again victorious, while the US and the Netherlands switched places to ascend the podium with silver and bronze, respectively.

This was the third Summer Paralympic Games without standing volleyball events, which had been included from the introduction of volleyball in 1976 (when sitting volleyball was a demonstration event) through 2000.

== Medalists ==
Event	Gold	Silver	Bronze
Men's team	Bosnia and Herzegovina (BIH); Ismet Godinjak; Adnan Manko; Adnan Kešmer; Asim Medić; Mirzet Duran; Nizam Čančar; Dževad Hamzić; Benis Kadrić; Safet Alibašić; Sabahudin Delalić (captain); Ermin Jusufović; Coach: Mirza Hrustemović	Iran (IRI); Majid Lashgari Sanami; Reza Peidayesh; Davoud Alipourian; Ahmad Eiri; Nasser Hassanpour Alinazari; Sadegh Bigdeli; Jalil Eimery (captain); Saeid Ebrahimi Baladezaei; Isa Zirahi; Ramezan Salehi Hajikolaei; Mohammad Khaleghi; Coach: Hadi Rezaei	Germany (GER); Alexander Schiffler; Thomas Renger; Stefan Haehnlein; Sebastian Czpakowski; Heiko Wiesenthal; Peter Schlorf; Jürgen Schrapp (captain); Christoph Herzog; Barbaros Sayilir; Torben Schiewe; Coach: Rudolf Sonnenbichler
Women's team	China (CHN); Tang Xue Mei; Lu Hong Qin (captain); Tan Yanhua; Su Li Mei; Zheng Xiong Ying; Wang Yanan; Li Liping; Zhang Xu Fei; Yang Yan Ling; Zhang Lijun; Sheng Yu Hong; Coach: Zhang Jun	United States (USA); Lora Webster; Brenda Maymon; Michelle Gerlosky; Kathryn Holloway; Heather Erickson; Monique Burkland; Kari Miller; Allison Aldrich; Nichole Millage; Kaleo Kanahele; Kendra Lancaster (captain); Coach: William Hamiter	Ukraine (UKR); Margaryta Pryvalykhina; Anzhelika Churkina (captain); Larysa Sinchuk; Galyna Kuznetsova; Olena Manankova; Ilona Yudina; Larysa Klochkova; Olga Shatylo; Larysa Ponomarenko; Valentyna Brik; Coach: Viktor Tymoshenko

== Classification ==
In sitting volleyball there are two categories of classification: disabled and minimal disability. A maximum of one minimally disabled player may be on the court for each team at any one time.

A part of the player's body between the buttocks and the shoulders must be in contact with the court when playing or attempting to play the ball.

== Qualification ==
There were 18 teams, 10 men's teams and 8 women's teams, taking part. Each country can enter one team per tournament.

== Men's tournament ==
=== Preliminary round ===
==== Group A ====
Pos	Team	Pld	W	L	Pts	SW	SL	SR	SPW	SPL	SPR
1	Germany	4	4	0	8	12	3	4.000	340	266	1.278
2	Russia	4	3	1	7	11	5	2.200	356	275	1.295
3	Egypt	4	2	2	6	9	6	1.500	424	402	1.055
4	Great Britain	4	1	3	5	3	9	0.333	230	276	0.833
5	Morocco	4	0	4	4	0	12	0.000	157	300	0.523

==== Group B ====
Pos	Team	Pld	W	L	Pts	SW	SL	SR	SPW	SPL	SPR
1	Iran	4	4	0	8	12	1	12.000	322	207	1.556
2	Bosnia and Herzegovina	4	3	1	7	10	3	3.333	309	240	1.288
3	Brazil	4	2	2	6	6	6	1.000	257	230	1.117
4	China	4	1	3	5	3	9	0.333	243	266	0.914
5	Rwanda	4	0	4	4	0	12	0.000	115	300	0.383

=== Final round ===
Quarter-finals
Germany	3
China	2
Egypt	0
Bosnia and Herzegovina	3
Russia	3
Brazil	2
Great Britain	0
Iran	3

Semi-finals
Germany	0
Bosnia and Herzegovina	3
Russia	0
Iran	3

Final
Bosnia and Herzegovina	3
Iran	1
Third place
Germany	3
Russia	2

== Women's tournament ==
=== Preliminary round ===
==== Group A ====
Pos	Team	Pld	W	L	Pts	SW	SL	SR	SPW	SPL	SPR
1	Ukraine	3	3	0	6	9	1	9.000	241	167	1.443
2	Netherlands	3	2	1	5	7	4	1.750	251	201	1.249
3	Japan	3	1	2	4	4	6	0.667	190	218	0.872
4	Great Britain	3	0	3	3	0	9	0.000	129	225	0.573

==== Group B ====
Pos	Team	Pld	W	L	Pts	SW	SL	SR	SPW	SPL	SPR
1	China	3	3	0	6	9	2	4.500	275	138	1.993
2	United States	3	2	1	5	7	2	3.500	245	187	1.310
3	Brazil	3	1	2	4	4	8	0.500	242	273	0.886
4	Slovenia	3	0	3	3	2	9	0.222	176	260	0.677

=== Final round ===
Semi-finals
Ukraine	0
United States	3
Netherlands	2
China	3

Final
United States	1
China	3
Third place
Ukraine	3
Netherlands	0
