= Germany at the 2012 Summer Paralympics =

- IPC code: GER
- NPC: National Paralympic Committee Germany
- Website: www.dbs-npc.de (in German)

in London
- Competitors: 150 in 15 sports
- Flag bearers: Daniela Schulte (opening); Thomas Schmidberger (closing)
- Medals Ranked 8th: Gold 18 Silver 26 Bronze 22 Total 66

Summer Paralympics appearances (overview)
- 1960; 1964; 1968; 1972; 1976; 1980; 1984; 1988; 1992; 1996; 2000; 2004; 2008; 2012; 2016; 2020; 2024

Other related appearances
- East Germany (1984)

Germany competed at the 2012 Summer Paralympics in London, United Kingdom, from 29 August to 9 September 2012. 150 German athletes, 88 men and 62 women, participated in London.

== Medallists ==
Medal	Name	Sport	Event	Date
Gold	Carmen Brussig	Judo	Women's 48 kg	30 August
Gold	Ramona Brussig	Judo	Women's 52 kg	30 August
Gold	Markus Rehm	Athletics	Men's long jump F42-44	31 August
Gold	Hannelore Brenner on Women of the World	Equestrian	Individual championship test grade III	2 September
Gold	Jochen Wollmert	Table tennis	Men's individual class 7	2 September
Gold	Holger Nikelis	Table tennis	Men's individual class 1	3 September
Gold	Sebastian Dietz	Athletics	Men's discus throw F35-F36	3 September
Gold	Birgit Kober	Athletics	Women's javelin throw F33/34/52/53	3 September
Gold	Hannelore Brenner on Women of the World	Equestrian	Individual freestyle test grade III	4 September
Gold	Tobias Graf	Cycling	Men's road time trial C2	5 September
Gold	Michael Teuber	Cycling	Men's road time trial C1	5 September
Gold	Andrea Eskau	Cycling	Women's road time trial H4	5 September
Gold	Kirsten Bruhn	Swimming	Women's 100 m breaststroke SB5	5 September
Gold	Birgit Kober	Athletics	Women's shot put F32/33/34	6 September
Gold	Andrea Eskau	Cycling	Women's road race H4	7 September
Gold	Daniela Schulte	Swimming	Women's 400 m freestyle S11	7 September
Gold	Heinrich Popow	Athletics	Men's 100 m T42	7 September
Gold	Women's wheelchair basketball team: Mareike Adermann; Annabel Breuer; Annegret Briessmann; Britt Dillmann; Heike Friedrich; Maria Kühn; Maya Lindholm; Marina Mohnen (captain); Edina Müller; Gesche Schünemann; Johanna Welin; Annika Zeyen	Wheelchair basketball	Women's tournament	7 September
Silver	Manuela Schmermund	Shooting	Women's 10 m air rifle standing SH1	30 August
Silver	Kirsten Bruhn	Swimming	Women's 100 m backstroke S7	30 August
Silver	Tobias Graf	Cycling	Men's individual pursuit C2	31 August
Silver	Wojtek Czyz	Athletics	Men's long jump F42-44	31 August
Silver	Britta Napel on Aquilina 3	Equestrian	Individual championship test grade II	1 September
Silver	Hannelore Brenner; Britta Näpel; Angelika Trabert; Steffen Zeibig	Equestrian	Mixed team test grade	1 September
Silver	Marianne Buggenhagen	Athletics	Women's shot put F54/55/56	1 September
Silver	Anke Molkenthin; Astrid Hengsbach; Tino Kolitscher; Kai Kruse; Katrin Splitt (Cox)	Rowing	Mixed coxed four	2 September
Silver	Britta Napel on Aquilina 3	Equestrian	Individual freestyle test grade II	3 September
Silver	Verena Schott	Swimming	Women's 200 m individual medley SM6	3 September
Silver	Marie Brämer-Skowronek	Athletics	Women's javelin throw F33/34/52/53	3 September
Silver	Norbert Mosandl	Cycling	Men's road time trial H4	5 September
Silver	Dorothee Vieth	Cycling	Women's road time trial H4	5 September
Silver	Hans-Peter Durst	Cycling	Mixed road time trial T1-2	5 September
Silver	Niels Grunenberg	Swimming	Men's 100 m breaststroke SB5	5 September
Silver	Torben Schmidtke	Swimming	Men's 100 m breaststroke SB6	5 September
Silver	Simone Briese-Baetke	Fencing	Women's épée B	5 September
Silver	Denise Schindler	Cycling	Women's road race C1-3	6 September
Silver	Steffen Warias	Cycling	Men's road race C1-3	6 September
Silver	Jens Kroker; Siegmund Mainka; Robert Prem	Sailing	Three-person keelboat sonar	6 September
Silver	Heiko Kröger	Sailing	One-person keelboat 2.4 metre	6 September
Silver	Thomas Schmidberger; Thomas Bruechle; Jan Guertler	Table tennis	Men's team class 3	7 September
Silver	Vico Merklein	Cycling	Men's road race H3	7 September
Silver	Sebastian Iwanow	Swimming	Men's 100 m freestyle S6	8 September
Silver	Elena Krawzow	Swimming	Women's 100 m breaststroke SB13	8 September
Silver	Daniela Schulte	Swimming	Women's 200 m individual medley SM11	8 September
Bronze	Tobias Graf	Cycling	Men's 1 km time trial C1–3	30 August
Bronze	Sebastian Iwanow	Swimming	Men's 100 m backstroke S6	30 August
Bronze	Josef Neumaier	Shooting	Men's 10 m air rifle standing SH1	31 August
Bronze	Matthias Krieger	Judo	Men's 81 kg	31 August
Bronze	Angelika Trabert on Ariva-Avanti	Equestrian	Individual championship test grade II	1 September
Bronze	Heinrich Popow	Athletics	Men's 200 m T42	1 September
Bronze	Claudia Nicoleitzik	Athletics	Women's 200 m T36	1 September
Bronze	Thomas Schmidberger	Table tennis	Men's individual class 3	2 September
Bronze	Michaela Floeth	Athletics	Women's shot put F42/44	3 September
Bronze	Angelika Trabert on Ariva-Avanti	Equestrian	Individual freestyle test grade II	3 September
Bronze	Maria Seifert	Athletics	Women's 200 m T37	5 September
Bronze	Martina Willing	Athletics	Women's javelin throw F54/55/56	5 September
Bronze	Jana Schmidt	Athletics	Women's 100 m T42	5 September
Bronze	Markus Rehm; Heinrich Popow; David Behre; Wojtek Czyz	Athletics	Men's 4 × 100 m relay T42/46	5 September
Bronze	Bernd Jeffre	Cycling	Men's road time trial H3	5 September
Bronze	Christoph Burkard	Swimming	Men's 100 m breaststroke SB6	5 September
Bronze	Katrin Green	Athletics	Women's 200 m T44	6 September
Bronze	Dorothee Vieth	Cycling	Women's road race H4	7 September
Bronze	Wojtek Czyz	Athletics	Men's 100 m T42	7 September
Bronze	Tanja Gröpper	Swimming	Women's 100 m freestyle S6	8 September
Bronze	Men's volleyball team: Sebastian Czpakowski; Stefan Hähnlein; Christoph Herzog; Thomas Renger; Barbaros Sayilir; Torben Schiewe; Alexander Schiffler; Peter Schlorf; Jürgen Schrapp; Heiko Wiesenthal	Volleyball	Men's tournament	8 September
Bronze	Claudia Nicoleitzik	Athletics	Women's 100 m T36	8 September

== Archery ==
Four athletes were nominated for the archery competitions.

Men

Athlete	Event	Ranking round		Round of 32	Round of 16	Quarterfinals	Semifinals	Finals	
Athlete	Event	Score	Seed	Opposition score	Opposition score	Opposition score	Opposition score	Opposition score	Rank
Matthias Alpers	Ind. recurve Standing	613	8	Shestakov (RUS); L 4–6	did not advance				
Maik Szarszewski	Ind. recurve W1/W2	589	12	Perez (MEX); W 6–0	Lee (KOR); L 0–6	did not advance			

Women

Athlete	Event	Ranking round		Round of 32	Round of 16	Quarterfinals	Semifinals	Finals	
Athlete	Event	Score	Seed	Opposition score	Opposition score	Opposition score	Opposition score	Opposition score	Rank
Maria Droste	Ind. recurve W1/W2	461	17	Perna (ITA); L 0–6	did not advance				
Katharina Schett	Ind. recurve Standing	497	14	Ford (USA); L 5–6	did not advance				

== Athletics ==
Men

Athlete	Class	Event	Heats		Semifinal		Final		
Athlete	Class	Event	Result	Rank	Result	Rank	Result	Points	Rank
David Behre	T44	100 m	12.21	5	N/A		did not advance		
David Behre	T44	200 m	23.65	3 q	N/A		23.71		7
David Behre	T44	400 m	51,37	2 Q	N/A		51.65		5
Reinhold Bötzel	F46	High jump	N/A				1.85		7
Wojtek Czyz	T42	100 m	12.53	1 Q	N/A		12.52		3rd place, bronze medalist(s)
Wojtek Czyz	T42	200 m	N/A				26.07		5
Wojtek Czyz	F42/44	Long jump	N/A				6.33	983	2nd place, silver medalist(s)
Sebastian Dietz	F35/36	Discus throw	N/A				38.54		1st place, gold medalist(s)
Ali Ghardooni	F57/58	Discus throw	N/A				40.79	810	9
Ulrich Iser	F54/55/56	Shot put	N/A				11.01	951	5
Mathias Mester	F40	Javelin throw	N/A				39.67		7
Heinrich Popow	T42	100 m	12.43	1 Q	N/A		12.40		1st place, gold medalist(s)
Heinrich Popow	T42	200 m	N/A				25.90		3rd place, bronze medalist(s)
Heinrich Popow	T42/44	Long jump	N/A				6.07		4
Markus Rehm	T44	100 m	11.92	4	N/A		did not advance		
Markus Rehm	F42/44	Long jump	N/A				7.35		1st place, gold medalist(s)
Matthias Schröder	T12	200 m	23.32	3	N/A		did not advance		
Matthias Schröder	T12	400 m	52.04	3	N/A		did not advance		
Marc Schuh	T54	100 m	14.18	2 Q	N/A		14.61		5
Marc Schuh	T54	400 m	48.87	2 Q	N/A		48.42		6
Matthias Schulze	F46	Shot put	N/A				14.04		5
Niels Stein	T35	100 m	13.41	3 Q	N/A		13.52		6
Niels Stein	T35	200 m	28.27	4 q	N/A		27.89		7
Frank Tinnemeier	F42/44	Shot put	N/A				11.14	718	10
Thomas Ulbricht	T12	100 m	11.29	2	N/A		did not advance		
Thomas Ulbricht	T12	200 m	22.56	1 Q	23.49	3	did not advance		
David Behre; Wojtek Czyz; Heinrich Popow; Markus Rehm	T42/46	4 × 100 m relay	N/A				45.23		3rd place, bronze medalist(s)

Women

Athlete	Class	Event	Heats		Semifinal		Final		
Athlete	Class	Event	Result	Rank	Result	Rank	Result	Points	Rank
Marie Brämer-Skowronek	F32/33	Shot put	N/A				7.01	776	10
Marie Brämer-Skowronek	F33/34/52/53	Javelin throw	N/A				20.43	1018	2nd place, silver medalist(s)
Marianne Buggenhagen	F54/55/56	Shot put	N/A				8.32	946	2nd place, silver medalist(s)
Siena Christen	F11/12	Discus throw	N/A				38.42	884	4
Laura Darimont	F46	Javelin throw	N/A				33.54		6
Michaela Floeth	F42/44	Shot put	N/A				12.21	979	3rd place, bronze medalist(s)
Isabelle Foerder	T37	100 m	14.82	5	N/A		did not advance		
Isabelle Foerder	T37	200 m	30.91	7	N/A		did not advance		
Isabelle Foerder	T37	400 m	1:11.95	5 q	N/A		1:13.47		7
Katrin Green	T44	100 m	13.63	2 Q	N/A		13.61		4
Katrin Green	T44	200 m	27.89 EU	2 Q	N/A		27.53		3rd place, bronze medalist(s)
Katrin Green	F42/44	Long jump	N/A				4.85	973	5
Maike Hausberger	T37	400 m	1:10.59	3 Q	N/A		1:10.45		5
Maike Hausberger	F37/38	Long jump	did not advance				3.88	900	9
Frances Herrmann	F32/33/34	Shot put	N/A				7.36	827	8
Frances Herrmann	F33/34/52/53	Javelin throw	N/A				18.62	925	5
Birgit Kober	F32/33/34	Shot put	N/A				10.25 WR	1112	1st place, gold medalist(s)
Birgit Kober	F33/34/52/53	Javelin throw	N/A				27.03 WR	1230	1st place, gold medalist(s)
Vanessa Low	T42	100 m	N/A				16.78		4
Vanessa Low	F42/44	Long jump	N/A				3.93	968	6
Sandra Mast	F20	Shot put	N/A				11.36		6
Claudia Nicoleitzik	T36	100 m	15.19	2 Q	N/A		14.88		3rd place, bronze medalist(s)
Claudia Nicoleitzik	T36	200 m	31.50	1 Q	N/A		32.08		3rd place, bronze medalist(s)
Jana Schmidt	T42	100 m	N/A				16.19		3rd place, bronze medalist(s)
Jana Schmidt	F42/44	Long jump	N/A				3.42	818	14
Maria Seifert	T37	100 m	14.30	1 Q	N/A		14.37		4
Maria Seifert	T37	200 m	29.87 EU	1 Q	N/A		29.86		3rd place, bronze medalist(s)
Maria Seifert	T37	400 m	DNS		N/A		did not advance		
Tamira Slaby	T38	100 m	DQ		N/A		did not advance		
Tamira Slaby	T38	200 m	28.63	2 Q	N/A		29.14		5
Martina Willing	F54/55/56	Shot put	N/A				8.86	931	4
Martina Willing	F54/55/56	Javelin throw	N/A				23.12	975	3rd place, bronze medalist(s)
Ilke Wyludda	F57/58	Shot put	N/A				10.23	937	5
Ilke Wyludda	F57/58	Discus throw	N/A				29.57	705	9
Maike Hausberger; Claudia Nicoleitzik; Maria Seifert; Tamira Slaby	T35/38	4 × 100 m relay	N/A				DQ		

== Cycling ==
=== Road ===
Athlete	Event	Time	Rank
Kerstin Brachtendorf	Women's road race C4–5	1:51:15	4
Kerstin Brachtendorf	Women's road time trial C5	26:34.61	7
Hans-Peter Durst	Mixed road race T1-2	DNF	
Hans-Peter Durst	Mixed road time trial T1-2	14:11.95	2nd place, silver medalist(s)
Andrea Eskau	Women's road race H4	1:31:05	1st place, gold medalist(s)
Andrea Eskau	Women's road time trial H4	28:18.09	1st place, gold medalist(s)
Tobias Graf	Men's road race C1-3	1:42.51	10
Tobias Graf	Men's road time trial C2	24:35.12	1st place, gold medalist(s)
Henrike Handrup; Ellen Heiny (Pilot)	Women's road race B	2:17:46	11
Henrike Handrup; Ellen Heiny (Pilot)	Women's road time trial B	38:41.74	12
Bernd Jeffré	Men's road race H3	2:01:19	6
Bernd Jeffré	Men's road time trial H3	27:00.90	3rd place, bronze medalist(s)
Vico Merklein	Men's road race H3	1:51:34	2nd place, silver medalist(s)
Vico Merklein	Men's road time trial H3	27:05.81	4
Norbert Mosandl	Men's road race H4	2:00:35	6
Norbert Mosandl	Men's road time trial H4	25:17.40	2nd place, silver medalist(s)
Wolfgang Sacher	Men's road race C4-5	2:01:25	16
Wolfgang Sacher	Men's road time trial C5	35:13.84	10
Denise Schindler	Women's road race C1-3	1:29:11	2nd place, silver medalist(s)
Denise Schindler	Women's road time trial C1-3	28:45.36	4
Michael Teuber	Men's road race C1-3	1:43:32	15
Michael Teuber	Men's road time trial C1	25:16.43	1st place, gold medalist(s)
Dorothee Vieth	Women's road race H4	1:41:21	3rd place, bronze medalist(s)
Dorothee Vieth	Women's road time trial H4	30:00.27	2nd place, silver medalist(s)
Steffen Warias	Men's road race C1-3	1:42:51	2nd place, silver medalist(s)
Steffen Warias	Men's road time trial C3	24:57.06	7
Max Weber	Men's road race H2	1:43:49	6
Max Weber	Men's road time trial H2	30:20.21	10
Erich Winkler	Men's road race C1-3	1:43:32	18
Erich Winkler	Men's road time trial C1	26:38.87	4

=== Track ===
Pursuit

Athlete	Event	Qualification		Final	
Athlete	Event	Time	Rank	Opposition Time	Rank
Kerstin Brachtendorf	Women's individual pursuit C5	4:12.245	8	did not advance	
Tobias Graf	Men's individual pursuit C2	3:47.799	2 Q	Liang (CHN); L 3:48.248	2nd place, silver medalist(s)
Henrike Handrup; Ellen Heiny (Pilot)	Women's individual pursuit B	3:46.697	8	did not advance	
Wolfgang Sacher	Men's individual pursuit C5	4:51.305	9	did not advance	
Denise Schindler	Women's individual pursuit C1–3	4:24.589	3 Q	Jones (USA); L 4:31.117	4
Michael Teuber	Men's individual pursuit C1	4:04.700	3 Q	Lopez (ARG); L 4:10.965	4
Steffen Warias	Men's individual pursuit C3	3:58.919	12	did not advance	
Erich Winkler	Men's individual pursuit C1	4:18.481	6	did not advance	

== Equestrian ==
Individual

Athlete	Horse	Event	Total	
Athlete	Horse	Event	Score	Rank
Hannelore Brenner	Women of the World	Individual championship test grade III	73.467	1st place, gold medalist(s)
Hannelore Brenner	Women of the World	Individual freestyle test grade III	81.700	1st place, gold medalist(s)
Britta Näpel	Aquilina 3	Individual championship test grade II	76.048	2nd place, silver medalist(s)
Britta Näpel	Aquilina 3	Individual freestyle test grade II	77.400	2nd place, silver medalist(s)
Angelika Trabert	Ariva-Avanti	Individual championship test grade II	76.000	3rd place, bronze medalist(s)
Angelika Trabert	Ariva-Avanti	Individual freestyle test grade II	76.150	3rd place, bronze medalist(s)
Lena Weifen	Don Turner	Individual championship test grade IV	67.581	9
Lena Weifen	Don Turner	Individual freestyle test grade IV	72.100	8
Steffen Zeibig	Waldemar	Individual championship test grade III	66.233	8
Steffen Zeibig	Waldemar	Individual freestyle test grade III	67.150	8

Team

Athlete	Horse	Event	Individual score			Total	
Athlete	Horse	Event	TT	CT	Total	Score	Rank
Britta Näpel	See above	Team	72.571	76.048	148.619*	440.970	2nd place, silver medalist(s)
Angelika Trabert	See above	Team	67.143	76.000	143.143*	440.970	2nd place, silver medalist(s)
Hannelore Brenner	See above	Team	75.741	73.467	149.208*	440.970	2nd place, silver medalist(s)
Steffen Zeibig	See above	Team	67.667	66.233	133.900	440.970	2nd place, silver medalist(s)

* Indicates the three best individual scores that count towards the team total.

== Judo ==
Men

Athlete	Class	Event	Preliminary	Quarterfinals	Semifinals	Repechage round 1	Repechage round 2	Final/ Bronze medal contest
Athlete	Class	Event	Opposition Result	Opposition Result	Opposition Result	Opposition Result	Opposition Result	Opposition Result
Sebastian Junk	B1-3 (B3)	73 kg	N/A	Önel (TUR); L 1011–0100	did not advance			
Matthias Krieger	B1-3 (B2)	81 kg	Powell (GBR); W 1121–0003	Pereira (BRA); W 1000–0101	Kosinov (UKR); L 0013–0212	N/A		Shevchenko (RUS); W 1110–0001 (bronze)
Oliver Upmann	B1-3 (B2)	100 kg	Sardarov (AZE); W 1000–0000	Alizadeh (IRI); L 0003–0100	Did not advance	N/A	Ingram (GBR); W 1000–0000	Fedin (RUS); L 0000–1010

Women

Athlete	Class	Event	Preliminary	Quarterfinals	Semifinals	Repechage round	Final/ Bronze medal contest
Athlete	Class	Event	Opposition Result	Opposition Result	Opposition Result	Opposition Result	Opposition Result
Carmen Brussig	B1-3 (B2)	48 kg	N/A	Potapova (RUS); W 1000–0001	Halinska (UKR); W 0021–0002	N/A	Lee (TPE); W 0100–0001 (gold)
Ramona Brussig	B1-3 (B3)	52 kg	N/A	Kılıç (TUR); W 1002–0014	Stepaniuk (RUS); W 1010–0000	N/A	Wang (CHN); W 1000–0000 (gold)

== Powerlifting ==
Men

Athlete	Class	Event	Result	Rank
Mario Hochberg	-	100 kg	170.0	10

== Rowing ==
Athletes	Class	Event	Heats		Repechage		Final A/B		Total Rank
Athletes	Class	Event	Result	Rank	Result	Rank	Result	Rank	Total Rank
Johannes Schmidt	AS	Men's single sculls	5:17.66	5	5:08.09	5 QFB	5:16.26	5	11
Astrid Hengsbach; Tino Kolitscher; Kai Kruse; Anke Molkenthin; Kathrin Splitt (Cox)	LTA	Mixed coxed four	3:15.91 WB	1 QFA	Bye		3:21.44	2	2nd place, silver medalist(s)

== Sailing ==
Athlete	Event	Race											Score	Rank
Athlete	Event	1	2	3	4	5	6	7	8	9	10	11	Score	Rank
Heiko Kröger	2.4mR	4	3	5	1	4	~~11~~	6	1	10	1	CAN	35	2nd place, silver medalist(s)
Jens Kroker; Siegmund Mainka; Robert Prem	Sonar	6	1	6	8	5	4	1	~~9~~	5	4	CAN	40	2nd place, silver medalist(s)

== Shooting ==
Men

Athlete	Event	Qualification		Final		
Athlete	Event	Score	Rank	Score	Total	Rank
Norbert Gau	Men's 10 m air rifle standing SH1	588	12	did not advance		
Norbert Gau	Men's 50 m rifle 3 positions SH1	1115	16	did not advance		
Frank Heitmeyer	Men's 10 m air pistol SH1	541	28	did not advance		
Frank Heitmeyer	Mixed 25 m pistol SH1	551	13	did not advance		
Frank Heitmeyer	Mixed 50 m pistol SH1	470	29	did not advance		
Josef Neumaier	Mixed 10 m air rifle prone SH1	598	17	did not advance		
Josef Neumaier	Mixed 50 m rifle prone SH1	574	40	did not advance		
Josef Neumaier	Men's 10 m air rifle standing SH1	594	2 Q	99.4	693.4	3rd place, bronze medalist(s)
Josef Neumaier	Men's 50 m rifle 3 positions SH1	1124	13	did not advance		
Leopold Rupp	Mixed 10 m air rifle prone SH2	595	26	did not advance		
Andreas Schäfers	Mixed 10 m air rifle prone SH2	599	15	did not advance		
Jan Schaub	Men's 50 m rifle 3 positions SH1	1095	25	did not advance		
Jan Schaub	Mixed 10 m air rifle prone SH1	594	32	did not advance		
Jan Schaub	Mixed 50 m rifle prone SH1	587	13	did not advance		

Women

Athlete	Event	Qualification		Final		
Athlete	Event	Score	Rank	Score	Total	Rank
Natascha Hiltrop	Women's 10 m air rifle standing SH1	381	15	did not advance		
Natascha Hiltrop	Women's 50 m rifle 3 positions SH1	545	11	did not advance		
Natascha Hiltrop	Mixed 10 m air rifle prone SH1	600 EWR, EPR	6 Q	104.4	704.4	6
Natascha Hiltrop	Mixed 50 m rifle prone SH1	580	25	did not advance		
Manuela Schmermund	Women's 10 m air rifle standing SH1	391	7 Q	102.6	493.6	2nd place, silver medalist(s)
Manuela Schmermund	Women's 50 m rifle 3 positions SH1	566	5 Q	84.5	660.3	5

== Swimming ==
Men

Athlete	Class	Event	Heats		Final	
Athlete	Class	Event	Result	Rank	Result	Rank
Christoph Burkard	S8	400 m freestyle	4:45.40	3 Q	4:44.23	8
Christoph Burkard	SB6	100 m breaststroke	1:27.60	2 Q	1:27.09	3rd place, bronze medalist(s)
Niels Grunenberg	SB5	100 m breaststroke	1:36.97	1 Q	1:34.98	2nd place, silver medalist(s)
Sebastian Iwanow	S6	50 m freestyle	31.29	1 Q	30.83	4
Sebastian Iwanow	S6	100 m freestyle	1:09.80	1 Q	1:07.34	2nd place, silver medalist(s)
Sebastian Iwanow	S6	400 m freestyle	5:33.28	3 Q	5:29.70	6
Sebastian Iwanow	S6	100 m backstroke	1:20.39	2 Q	1:15.95	3rd place, bronze medalist(s)
Andre Lehmann	S14	200 m freestyle	2:07.42	5	Did not advance	
Andre Lehmann	S14	100 m backstroke	1:09.05	6	Did not advance	
Lucas Ludwig	S10	100 m freestyle	55.71	3	Did not advance	
Lucas Ludwig	S10	400 m freestyle	4:16.98	2 Q	4:16.30	6
Lucas Ludwig	S10	100 m backstroke	1:02.96	3 Q	1:02.05	6
Lucas Ludwig	S10	100 m butterfly	1:00.85	5	Did not advance	
Lucas Ludwig	SM10	200 m individual medley	2:18.37	4 Q	2:17.31	6
Swen Michaelis	S6	100 m freestyle	1:14.44	6	Did not advance	
Swen Michaelis	S6	400 m freestyle	5:30.43	3 Q	5:37.38	8
Swen Michaelis	S6	100 m backstroke	1:23.49	3 Q	1:23.54	6
Swen Michaelis	S6	50 m butterfly	37.20	6	Did not advance	
Swen Michaelis	SM6	200 m individual medley	2:57.39	4 Q	2:58.50	8
Tobias Pollap	S7	50 m freestyle	30.70	5 Q	29.57	8
Tobias Pollap	S7	100 m freestyle	1:06.96	5	Did not advance	
Tobias Pollap	S7	400 m freestyle	5:20.08	7	Did not advance	
Tobias Pollap	S7	50 m butterfly	35.54	5	Did not advance	
Tobias Pollap	SB7	100 m breaststroke	1:27.04	5	Did not advance	
Tobias Pollap	SM7	200 m individual medley	2:52.26	4 Q	2:46.39	8
Torben Schmidtke	S8	400 m freestyle	5:01.05	5	Did not advance	
Torben Schmidtke	SB8	100 m breaststroke	1:26.13 PR	1 Q	1:25.23	2nd place, silver medalist(s)
Martin Schulz	S9	100 m butterfly	1:06.54	7	Did not advance	
Martin Schulz	SB8	100 m breaststroke	1:18.27	6	Did not advance	
Martin Schulz	SM9	200 m individual medley	2:27.18	7	Did not advance	
Daniel Simon	S12	50 m freestyle	25.35	2 Q	25.55	7
Daniel Simon	S12	100 m freestyle	56.59	5	Did not advance	
Daniel Simon	S12	400 m freestyle	4:36.87	4 Q	4:30.95	6
Daniel Simon	S12	100 m backstroke	1:07.34	5	Did not advance	
Daniel Simon	S12	100 m butterfly	1:02.51	4 Q	1:02.10	7
Daniel Simon	SB12	100 m breaststroke	1:15.05	5	Did not advance	
Daniel Simon	SM12	200 m individual medley	2:24.19	5	2:20.86	7

Women

Athlete	Class	Event	Heats		Final	
Athlete	Class	Event	Result	Rank	Result	Rank
Kirsten Bruhn	S7	50 m freestyle	34.34	3 Q	34.24	5
Kirsten Bruhn	S7	100 m freestyle	1:14.60	2 Q	1:14:43	5
Kirsten Bruhn	S7	100 m backstroke	1:25.12	1 Q	1:25.22	2nd place, silver medalist(s)
Kirsten Bruhn	SB5	100 m breaststroke	1:35.03 PR	1 Q	1:35.50	1st place, gold medalist(s)
Annke Conradi	S3	50 m freestyle	N/A		1:10.38	7
Annke Conradi	S3	100 m freestyle	2:24.12	3 Q	2:21.92	6
Annke Conradi	S4	50 m backstroke	1:07.24	6	Did not advance	
Tanja Gröpper	S6	50 m freestyle	35.76	1 Q	36.28	4
Tanja Gröpper	S6	100 m freestyle	1:16.72	2 Q	1:16.83	3rd place, bronze medalist(s)
Tanja Gröpper	S6	400 m freestyle	6:24.56	6	Did not advance	
Julia Kabus	S8	50 m freestyle	35.00	6	Did not advance	
Julia Kabus	S8	100 m freestyle	1:14.74	4	Did not advance	
Julia Kabus	S8	400 m freestyle	5:19.20	3 Q	5:21.46	7
Julia Kabus	S8	100 m butterfly	1:16.25	7	Did not advance	
Julia Kabus	SM8	200 m individual medley	3:22.28	7	Did not advance	
Elena Krawzow	S13	50 m freestyle	29.65	4 Q	29.46	8
Elena Krawzow	S13	100 m freestyle	1:07.93	6	Did not advance	
Elena Krawzow	SB13	100 m breaststroke	1:21.70 EU	2 Q	1:20.31 EU	2nd place, silver medalist(s)
Elena Krawzow	SM13	200 m individual medley	2:46.61	5	Did not advance	
Christiane Reppe	S9	100 m freestyle	1:07.09	5	Did not advance	
Christiane Reppe	S9	400 m freestyle	4:55.44	3 Q	4:53.93	5
Christiane Reppe	S9	100 m backstroke	1:17.55	4 Q	1:17.88	8
Maike Naomi Schnittger	S12	50 m freestyle	DNS		Did not advance	
Maike Naomi Schnittger	S12	100 m freestyle	DNS		Did not advance	
Maike Naomi Schnittger	S12	400 m freestyle	4:58.93	3 Q	4:56.38	7
Maike Naomi Schnittger	S12	100 m butterfly	N/A		1:16.70	7
Verena Schott	S7	50 m freestyle	35.94	4 Q	36.46	8
Verena Schott	S7	400 m freestyle	5:46.04	5 Q	5:42.26	8
Verena Schott	S7	100 m backstroke	1:30.43	5	Did not advance	
Verena Schott	S7	50 m butterfly	40.83	5	Did not advance	
Verena Schott	SB5	100 m breaststroke	1:54.34	1 Q	1:53.09	5
Verena Schott	SM6	200 m individual medley	3:16.63	1 Q	3:14.28	2nd place, silver medalist(s)
Daniela Schulte	S11	50 m freestyle	33.12	2 Q	33.00	7
Daniela Schulte	S11	100 m freestyle	1:11.60	1 Q	1:11.50	6
Daniela Schulte	S11	400 m freestyle	5:11.32 PR	1 Q	5:14.36	1st place, gold medalist(s)
Daniela Schulte	S11	100 m backstroke	1:20.92	2 Q	1:20.09	4
Daniela Schulte	SB11	100 m breaststroke	1:36.74	3 Q	1:36.16	4
Daniela Schulte	SM11	200 m individual medley	2:48.86 WR	1 Q	2:49.57	2nd place, silver medalist(s)
Vera Thamm	S3	50 m freestyle	N/A		1:17.04	8
Vera Thamm	S3	100 m freestyle	2:34.63	5	Did not advance	
Vera Thamm	S4	50 m backstroke	1:16.89	7	Did not advance	
Stefanie Weinberg	S8	50 m freestyle	32.68	4	Did not advance	
Stefanie Weinberg	S8	100 m freestyle	1:14.80	5	Did not advance	
Stefanie Weinberg	S8	100 m backstroke	1:24.71	4	Did not advance	
Stefanie Weinberg	S8	100 m butterfly	1:19.54	5 Q	1:16.88	7
Stefanie Weinberg	SM8	200 m individual medley	2:57.49	2 Q	2:57.20	5

== Table tennis ==
Men

Athlete	Event	Preliminaries			Quarterfinals	Semifinals	Final / BM	
Athlete	Event	Opposition Result	Opposition Result	Rank	Opposition Result	Opposition Result	Opposition Result	Rank
Holger Nikelis	Individual C1	Keller (SUI); W 3–0	Cho JK (KOR); W 3–1	1 Q	—N/a	Davies (GBR); W 3–0	Ducay (FRA); W 3-1	1st place, gold medalist(s)
Thomas Bruechler	Individual C3	Kramminger (AUT); W 3-0	M Rodriguez (ESP); W 3-1	1 Q	Merrien (FRA); L 1-3	did not advance		
Jan Guertler	Individual C3	Zhao P (CHN); L 1-3	Jeyoung (KOR); L 0-3	3	did not advance			
Thomas Schmidberger	Individual C3	Kim JS (KOR); W 3-0	Guilhem (FRA); W 3-0	1 Q	Robin (FRA); W 3-1	Kesler (SRB); L 0-3	Merrien (FRA); W 3-1	3rd place, bronze medalist(s)
Werner Burkhardt	Individual C4	Thomas (FRA); L 0-3	Spalj (CRO); L 2-3	3	did not advance			
Dietmar Kober	Individual C4	Guo X (CHN); L 0-3	Babes (BRA); W 3-1	2	did not advance			
Selcuk Cetin	Individual C5	Rosec (FRA); L 1-3	Kim BY (KOR); W 3-2	2	did not advance			
Thomasz Kusiak	Individual C6	Alecci (ITA); L 1-3	Wetherill (GBR); W 3-1	2	did not advance			
Thomas Rau	Individual C6	Choy (HKG); L 1-3	Gregorovic (CRO); W 3-2	2	did not advance			
Thorsten Schwinn	Individual C7	Morales (ESP); L 0-3	Dourbecker (FRA); W 3-1	2	did not advance			
Jochen Wollmert	Individual C7	Youssef (EGY); W 3-0	Lambert (CZE); W 3-1	1 Q	Morales (ESP); W 3-2	Popov (UKR); W 3-2	Bayley (GBR); W 3-1	1st place, gold medalist(s)

Women

Athlete	Event	Preliminaries				Semifinals	Final / BM	
Athlete	Event	Opposition Result	Opposition Result	Opposition Result	Rank	Opposition Result	Opposition Result	Rank
Stephanie Grebe	Individual C6	Klymenko (UKR); L 1–3	Eigner (POL); W 3–1	McDonnell (AUS); W 3–0	2 Q	Khodzynska (UKR); L 0–3	Klymenko (UKR); L 1-3	4

Teams

Athlete	Event	First Round	Quarterfinals	Semifinals	Final / BM	
Athlete	Event	Opposition Result	Opposition Result	Opposition Result	Opposition Result	Rank
Thomas Bruechle; Jan Guertler; Thomas Schmidberger	Men's team C3	—N/a	Argentina (ARG); W 3–1	France (FRA); W 3-0	China (CHN); L 2-3	2nd place, silver medalist(s)
Selcuk Cetin; Dietmar Kober	Men's team C4-5	Brazil (BRA); W 3-2	China (CHN); L 0-3	did not advance		
Thorsten Schwinn; Jochen Wollmert	Men's team C6-8	Slovakia (SVK); W 3-1	Sweden (SWE); W 3-1	Spain (ESP); L 0-3	Great Britain (GBR); L 0-3	4

== Volleyball ==
Germany qualified for the men's team event by winning against Ukraine at the Intercontinental Cup.

=== Men's tournament ===
Roster

The following is the German roster in the men's volleyball tournament of the 2012 Summer Paralympics.

Head coach: Rudi Sonnenbichler

№	Name	Date of birth	Position	2012 club
1	Alexander Schiffler	20 January 1982	UN	(Germany) BV Leipzig
3	Thomas Renger	19 August 1972	M	(Germany) TSV Bayer Leverkusen
5	Stefan Hähnlein	12 June 1990	SE	(Germany) TSV Bayer Leverkusen
6	Sebastian Czpakowski	12 April 1974	WS	(Germany) TSV Bayer Leverkusen
7	Heiko Wiesenthal	12 February 1975	OS	(Germany) TSV Bayer Leverkusen
8	Peter Schlorf	4 June 1986	M	(Germany) SSC Berlin
9	Jürgen Schrapp	27 July 1974	WS	(Germany) TSV Bayer Leverkusen
10	Christoph Herzog	27 July 1983	WS	(Germany) BV Leipzig
11	Barbaros Sayilir	25 October 1988	UN	(Germany) TSV Bayer Leverkusen
14	Torben Schiewe	11 March 1985	SE	(Germany) BCV Celle

Group play

Pos	Team	Pld	W	L	Pts	SW	SL	SR	SPW	SPL	SPR
1	Germany	4	4	0	8	12	3	4.000	340	266	1.278
2	Russia	4	3	1	7	11	5	2.200	356	275	1.295
3	Egypt	4	2	2	6	9	6	1.500	424	402	1.055
4	Great Britain	4	1	3	5	3	9	0.333	230	276	0.833
5	Morocco	4	0	4	4	0	12	0.000	157	300	0.523

31 August 2012; 11:00	Germany	3–0	Morocco	ExCeL London, London; Referees: France Marcoux (CAN), Jung Mal-Soon (KOR)
31 August 2012; 11:00	(25–11, 25–10, 25–9); Report			ExCeL London, London; Referees: France Marcoux (CAN), Jung Mal-Soon (KOR)

1 September 2012; 11:00	Russia	2–3	Germany	ExCeL London, London; Referees: Khalid Shanishah (LBA), Janko Plešnik (SLO)
1 September 2012; 11:00	(18–25, 25–11, 19–25, 25–15, 13–15); Report			ExCeL London, London; Referees: Khalid Shanishah (LBA), Janko Plešnik (SLO)

3 September 2012; 11:00	Great Britain	0–3	Germany	ExCeL London, London; Referees: Masoud Yazdanpanah (IRI), Xin Xia (CHN)
3 September 2012; 11:00	(19–25, 16–25, 14–25); Report			ExCeL London, London; Referees: Masoud Yazdanpanah (IRI), Xin Xia (CHN)

4 September 2012; 9:00	Egypt	1–3	Germany	ExCeL London, London; Referees: Toomas Murulo (EST), Dominik Raca (CRO)
4 September 2012; 9:00	(16–25, 22–25, 25–23, 24–26); Report			ExCeL London, London; Referees: Toomas Murulo (EST), Dominik Raca (CRO)

Quarter-final

5 September 2012; 9:00	Germany	3–2	China	ExCeL London, London; Referees: Adnan Kolos (BIH), France Marcoux (CAN)
5 September 2012; 9:00	(19–25, 21–25, 25–21, 25–19, 15–10); Report			ExCeL London, London; Referees: Adnan Kolos (BIH), France Marcoux (CAN)

Semi-final

6 September 2012; 16:00	Germany	0–3	Bosnia and Herzegovina	ExCeL London, London; Referees: Jung Mal-Soon (KOR), Khalid Shanishah (LBA)
6 September 2012; 16:00	(19–25, 20–25, 14–25); Report			ExCeL London, London; Referees: Jung Mal-Soon (KOR), Khalid Shanishah (LBA)

Bronze medal match

8 September 2012; 16:00	Germany	3–2	Russia	ExCeL London, London; Referees: Dariusz Jasinski (POL), Glynn Archibald (GBR)
8 September 2012; 16:00	(20–25, 26–24, 22–25, 25–22, 16–14); Report			ExCeL London, London; Referees: Dariusz Jasinski (POL), Glynn Archibald (GBR)

== Wheelchair basketball ==
Competing athletes are given an eight-level-score specific to wheelchair basketball, ranging from 0.5 to 4.5 with lower scores representing a higher degree of disability. The sum score of all players on the court cannot exceed 14.

=== Men's tournament ===
Squad list
(classification points)
From:
- André Bienek (3.0)
- Thomas Böhme (3.0)
- Thomas Gundert (2.0)
- Jan Haller (2.0)
- Mathias Heimbach (1.0)
- Sercan Ismail (1.0)
- Dirk Köhler (4.0)
- Andreas Kreß (3.5)
- Björn Lohmann (1.0)
- Sebastian Magenheim (3.5)
- Dirk Passiwan (4.5)
- Sebastian Wolk (4.0)

Group stage

Team	Pld	W	L	PF	PA	PD	Pts	Qualification
Canada	5	5	0	362	280	+82	10	Quarter-finals
Germany	5	4	1	339	303	+36	9	Quarter-finals
Great Britain	5	3	2	365	301	+64	8	Quarter-finals
Poland	5	2	3	327	341	−14	7	Quarter-finals
Japan	5	1	4	273	330	−57	6	Eliminated
Colombia	5	0	5	223	334	−111	5	Eliminated

30 August 2012
19:00

Report

Great Britain	72–77 (OT)	Germany
Scoring by quarter: 10–21, 17–13, 23–13, 16–19, Overtime: 6–11
Pts: Munn 21; Rebs: Munn 14; Asts: Bywater 9		Pts: Passiwan 26; Rebs: Bienek 11; Asts: Bienek 12

North Greenwich Arena, London
Referees: Juan Uruñuela (ESP)

31 August 2012
10:45

Report

Germany	59–46	Colombia
Scoring by quarter: 17–6, 21–8, 9–15, 12–17
Pts: Wolk 13; Rebs: Passiwan 8 Asts: Passiwan 8		Pts: Hawkins 16; Rebs: Hawkins 19; Asts: Sanz Londono 7

Basketball Arena, London
Referees: Sergio Giordano (CAN)

1 September 2012
15:15

Report

Japan	49–64	Germany
Scoring by quarter: 18–14, 7–13, 13–11, 11–26
Pts: Fujimoto 13; Rebs: Kozai 8 Asts: Kozai 7		Pts: Köhler 16; Rebs: Böhme 12; Asts: Bienek 8

Basketball Arena, London
Referees: Nureddin Bilmez (TUR)

2 September 2012
15:15

Report

Germany	66–73	Canada
Scoring by quarter: 18–17, 10–19, 19–17, 19–20
Pts: Passiwan 29; Rebs: Passiwan 8 Asts: Passiwan 8		Pts: Anderson 25; Rebs: Anderson 15; Asts: Anderson 12

Basketball Arena, London
Referees: Matt Wells (AUS)

3 September 2012
20:45

Report

Germany	73–63	Poland
Scoring by quarter: 11–15, 18–22, 15–14, 29–12
Pts: Haller 17; Rebs: Bienek 10; Asts: Passiwan, Bienek 6		Pts: Filipski 27; Rebs: Luszynski 10; Asts: Luszynski 8

Basketball Arena, London
Referees: Juan Uruñuela (ESP)

Quarter-final

5 September 2012
13:00

Report

Germany	46–57	United States
Scoring by quarter: 11–14, 17–11, 9–12, 9–20
Pts: Bienek 18; Rebs: Bienek 13; Asts: three players 3		Pts: three players 10; Rebs: Turek 8 Asts: Schulte 6

North Greenwich Arena, London
Referees: Christopher Gregory (GBR)

5th–8th place semi-final

7 September 2012
13:00

Report

Poland	66–81	Germany
Scoring by quarter: 17–18, 16–24, 15–20, 18–19
Pts: Filipski 31; Rebs: Balcerowski 9 Asts: Luszynski 9		Pts: Passiwan 30; Rebs: Passiwan 10; Asts: Haller 8

North Greenwich Arena, London
Referees: Sébastien Gauthier (CAN)

5th/6th place match

8 September 2012
15:15

Report

Germany	48–67	Spain
Scoring by quarter: 9–10, 14–16, 12–18, 13–23
Pts: Bienek 14; Rebs: Bienek 5 Asts: Wolk 10		Pts: De Paz Pazo 17; Rebs: De Paz Pazo 6 Asts: De Paz Pazo 9

North Greenwich Arena, London
Referees: Christopher Gregory (GBR)

=== Women's tournament ===
Germany qualified for the women's team event in wheelchair basketball by finishing second at the 2010 Wheelchair Basketball World Championship.

Squad list
(classification points)
From:
- Mareike Adermann (4.5)
- Annabel Breuer (1.5)
- Annegret Brießmann (1.0)
- Britt Dillmann (1.0)
- Heike Friedrich (4.5)
- Maria Kühn (1.0)
- Maya Lindholm (2.5)
- Marina Mohnen (4.5)
- Edina Müller (2.5)
- Gesche Schünemann (4.5)
- Johanna Welin (2.0)
- Annika Zeyen (1.5)

Group stage

Team	Pld	W	L	PF	PA	PD	Pts	Qualification
Germany	4	4	0	254	158	+96	8	Quarter-finals
United States	4	3	1	246	176	+70	7	Quarter-finals
China	4	2	2	240	204	+36	6	Quarter-finals
Mexico	4	1	3	157	230	−73	5	Quarter-finals
France	4	0	4	132	261	−129	4	Eliminated

31 August 2012
13:00

Report

Germany	54–48	United States
Scoring by quarter: 13–17, 10–6, 10–13, 21–12
Pts: Mohnen 15; Rebs: Mohnen 10; Asts: Mohnen 7		Pts: Schneider, Miller 12; Rebs: Schneider 8 Asts: Murray 7

Basketball Arena, London
Referees: Valerie Farrugia (FRA)

1 September 2012
15:15

Report

France	32–76	Germany
Scoring by quarter: 14–20, 8–15, 5–19, 5–22
Pts: Quemener-Pichon 12; Rebs: Saint-Omer Delépine 12; Asts: Ménard 3		Pts: Mohnen 23; Rebs: Friedrich 6 Asts: Zeyen 8

North Greenwich Arena, London
Referees: Stacy Gomm (RSA)

2 September 2012
10:45

Report

Germany	56–50	China
Scoring by quarter: 13–17, 17–7, 20–11, 6–15
Pts: Schünemann 23; Rebs: Schünemann 12; Asts: Schünemann 6		Pts: Long 16; Rebs: Cheng 7 Asts: Long, Peng 4

Basketball Arena, London
Referees: Linas Radykas (LTU)

3 September 2012
10:45

Report

Mexico	28–68	Germany
Scoring by quarter: 5–10, 14–24, 5–19, 4–15
Pts: Estrada Bernal 12; Rebs: Pérez Pacheco 3 Asts: Estrada Bernal 10		Pts: Adermann 18; Rebs: Adermann 10; Asts: Müller 6

Basketball Arena, London
Referees: Shu Fei Hsieh (TPE)

Quarter-final

4 September 2012
19:00

Report

Germany	55–44	Great Britain
Scoring by quarter: 8–12, 14–9, 12–12, 21–11
Pts: Zeyen 25; Rebs: Schünemann 5 Asts: Schünemann 14		Pts: Freeman 19; Rebs: Sugden 7 Asts: Freeman 8

North Greenwich Arena, London
Referees: Sébastien Gauthier (CAN)

Semi-final

6 September 2012
15:15

Report

Netherlands	46–49	Germany
Scoring by quarter: 8–12, 21–12, 8–12, 9–13
Pts: Huitzing 16; Rebs: Huitzing, Beijer 12; Asts: Huitzing 8		Pts: Mohnen 20; Rebs: Schünemann 8 Asts: Zeyen 6

North Greenwich Arena, London
Referees: Juan Uruñuela (ESP)

Gold medal match

7 September 2012
21:15

Report

Australia	44–58	Germany
Scoring by quarter: 10–14, 9–12, 9–8, 16–24
Pts: Gauci 15; Rebs: Gauci, Merritt 5 Asts: Crispin, Chaplin 5		Pts: Adermann 19; Rebs: Mohnen 9 Asts: Adermann, Zeyen 5

North Greenwich Arena, London
Referees: Sergio Giordano (CAN)

== Wheelchair fencing ==
Athlete	Event	Qualification			Quarterfinal	Semifinal	Final / BM	
Athlete	Event	Opposition	Score	Rank	Opposition Score	Opposition Score	Opposition Score	Rank
Simone Briese-Baetke	Women's individual épée B	Dani (HUN)	W 5–2	1 Q	Demaude (FRA); W 15–4	Vasileva (RUS); W 15–9	Jana (THA); L 8–15	2nd place, silver medalist(s)
Simone Briese-Baetke	Women's individual épée B	Moore (GBR)	W 5–1	1 Q	Demaude (FRA); W 15–4	Vasileva (RUS); W 15–9	Jana (THA); L 8–15	2nd place, silver medalist(s)
Simone Briese-Baetke	Women's individual épée B	Vasileva (RUS)	W 5–3	1 Q	Demaude (FRA); W 15–4	Vasileva (RUS); W 15–9	Jana (THA); L 8–15	2nd place, silver medalist(s)
Simone Briese-Baetke	Women's individual épée B	Makrytskaya (BLR)	W 5–4	1 Q	Demaude (FRA); W 15–4	Vasileva (RUS); W 15–9	Jana (THA); L 8–15	2nd place, silver medalist(s)
Simone Briese-Baetke	Women's individual épée B	Jana (THA)	W 5–4	1 Q	Demaude (FRA); W 15–4	Vasileva (RUS); W 15–9	Jana (THA); L 8–15	2nd place, silver medalist(s)
Simone Briese-Baetke	Women's individual foil B	Zhou (CHN)	L 3–5	2 Q	Makowska (POL); L 11–15	did not advance		5
Simone Briese-Baetke	Women's individual foil B	Moore (GBR)	W 5–0	2 Q	Makowska (POL); L 11–15	did not advance		5
Simone Briese-Baetke	Women's individual foil B	Lukianenko (UKR)	W 5–1	2 Q	Makowska (POL); L 11–15	did not advance		5
Simone Briese-Baetke	Women's individual foil B	Mishurova (RUS)	W 5–0	2 Q	Makowska (POL); L 11–15	did not advance		5
Simone Briese-Baetke	Women's individual foil B	Palfi (HUN)	W 5–2	2 Q	Makowska (POL); L 11–15	did not advance		5

== Wheelchair tennis ==
Women

Athlete	Class	Event	First round	1/8 finals	Quarterfinals	Semifinals	Finals
Athlete	Class	Event	Opposition Result	Opposition Result	Opposition Result	Opposition Result	Opposition Result
Sabine Ellerbrock	Open	Singles	Schoenn (FRA); W 6–3, 6–1	Park (KOR); W 6–4, 6–1	Buis (NED); W 3–6, 7–5, 6–2	Van Koot (NED); L 5–7, 2–6	Bronze medal match Griffioen (NED); L 2–6, 6–7
Katharina Krüger	Open	Singles	Ortiz (CHI); W 7–5, 7–5	Vergeer (NED); L 0–6, 0–6	did not advance		
Sabine Ellerbrock; Katharina Krüger	Open	Doubles	N/A	Kaiser (USA); Soldan (USA); W 5–7, 6–2, 7–5	Shuker (GBR); Whiley (GBR); L 3–6, 3–6	Did not advance	

== See also ==
- 2012 Summer Paralympics
- Germany at the Paralympics
- Germany at the 2012 Summer Olympics
