= Annegret =

Annegret is a German feminine given name. Notable people with the name include:

- Annegret Brießmann (born 1972), 1.0 point wheelchair basketball player
- Annegret Dietrich (born 1980), German-born Swiss bobsledder
- Annegret Kober (born 1957), German backstroke swimmer
- Annegret Kramp-Karrenbauer (born 1962), German CDU politician
- Annegret Kroniger (1952–2025), German athlete who mainly competed in the 100 metres
- Annegret Richter (born 1950), German athlete and the 1976 Olympic 100 m champion
- Annegret Soltau (born 1946), German visual artist
- Annegret Strauch (born 1968), German rower

== Fictional ==
- Annegret Wittkamp, a character on Verbotene Liebe
