= Cycling at the 2012 Summer Paralympics – Women's road race H4 =

Cycling, Women's road race H4 at the XIV Paralympic Games
- Venue: Brands Hatch
- Dates: September 7, 2012
- Competitors: 6 from 5 nations

Medalists
1st place, gold medalist(s)		Andrea Eskau	Germany
2nd place, silver medalist(s)		Laura de Vaan	Netherlands
3rd place, bronze medalist(s)		Dorothee Vieth	Germany

The Women's race H4 track cycling event at the 2012 Summer Paralympics took place on September 7 at Brands Hatch. six riders from five different nations competed. The race distance was 48 km.

== Results ==
Rank	Name	Country	Time
1st place, gold medalist(s)	Andrea Eskau	Germany	1:31:05
2nd place, silver medalist(s)	Laura de Vaan	Netherlands	1:41:21
3rd place, bronze medalist(s)	Dorothee Vieth	Germany	1:41:21
4	Jessica Hedlund	Sweden	1:48:42
5	Monika Pudlis	Poland	1:49:30
6	Pascale Bercovitch	Israel	LAP
