= Cycling at the 2012 Summer Paralympics – Men's road time trial C2 =

Cycling, Men's road time trial C2 at the XIV Paralympic Games
- Venue: Brands Hatch
- Dates: September 5, 2012
- Competitors: 16 from 13 nations

Medalists
| 1st place, gold medalist(s) | | Tobias Graf | Germany |
| 2nd place, silver medalist(s) | | Liang Guihua | China |
| 3rd place, bronze medalist(s) | | Maurice Eckhard Tio | Spain |

The Men's time trial C2 road cycling event at the 2012 Summer Paralympics took place on September 5 at Brands Hatch. Sixteen riders from thirteen different nations competed. The race distance was 16 km.

== Results ==
| Rank | Name | Country | Time |
|---|---|---|---|
| 1st place, gold medalist(s) | Tobias Graf | Germany | 24:35.12 |
| 2nd place, silver medalist(s) | Liang Guihua | China | 24:40.33 |
| 3rd place, bronze medalist(s) | Maurice Eckhard Tio | Spain | 24:40.76 |
| 4 | Laurent Thirionet | France | 24:57.83 |
| 5 | Colin Lynch | Ireland | 24:58.23 |
| 6 | Michal Stark | Czech Republic | 25:25.73 |
| 7 | Ivo Koblasa | Czech Republic | 25:26.85 |
| 8 | Alvaro Galvis Becerra | Colombia | 25:46.71 |
| 9 | Cirio De Jesus Molina | Venezuela | 25:48.00 |
| 10 | Victor Hugo Garrido Marquez | Venezuela | 26:40.12 |
| 11 | Roman Pongrac | Slovenia | 27:28.45 |
| 12 | Arnold Boldt | Canada | 27:31.82 |
| 13 | Jaroslav Svestka | Slovakia | 27:53.84 |
| 14 | Jaco Nel | South Africa | 28:12.44 |
| 15 | Xie Hao | China | 29:22.79 |
| 16 | Mumuni Alem | Ghana | 32:49.56 |
