= Cycling at the 2012 Summer Paralympics – Women's road time trial H4 =

Cycling, Women's road time trial H4 at the XIV Paralympic Games
- Venue: Brands Hatch
- Dates: September 5, 2012
- Competitors: 6 from 5 nations

Medalists
1st place, gold medalist(s)		Andrea Eskau	Germany
2nd place, silver medalist(s)		Dorothee Vieth	Germany
3rd place, bronze medalist(s)		Laura de Vaan	Netherlands

The Women's time trial H4 road cycling event at the 2012 Summer Paralympics took place on September 5 at Brands Hatch. six riders from five different nations competed. The race distance was 16 km.

== Results ==
Rank	Name	Country	Time
1st place, gold medalist(s)	Andrea Eskau	Germany	28:18.09
2nd place, silver medalist(s)	Dorothee Vieth	Germany	30:00.27
3rd place, bronze medalist(s)	Laura de Vaan	Netherlands	30:24.82
4	Jessica Hedlund	Sweden	34:14.31
5	Monika Pudlis	Poland	34:26.30
6	Pascale Bercovitch	Israel	38:49.22
