= Cycling at the 2012 Summer Paralympics – Men's individual pursuit C2 =

Cycling, Men's Ind. Pursuit C2 at the XIV Paralympic Games
- Venue: ExCeL Exhibition Centre
- Dates: 31 August
- Competitors: 12 from 10 nations

Medalists
1st place, gold medalist(s)		Liang Guihua	China
2nd place, silver medalist(s)		Tobias Graf	Germany
3rd place, bronze medalist(s)		Laurent Thirionet	France

The Men's Individual Pursuit C2 track cycling event at the 2012 Summer Paralympics took place on 31 August at London Velopark. The race distance was 3 km long.

== Preliminaries ==
Q = Qualifier WR = World Record

Rank	Name	Country	Time
1	Liang Guihua	China	3:45.828 Q WR
2	Tobias Graf	Germany	3:47.799 Q
3	Laurent Thirionet	France	3:52.955 Q
4	Colin Lynch	Ireland	3:54.946 Q
5	Alvaro Galvis Becerra	Colombia	3:55.618
6	Maurice Eckhard Tio	Spain	3:57.369
7	Michal Stark	Czech Republic	4:00.840
8	Ivo Koblasa	Czech Republic	4:04.679
9	Xie Hao	China	4:11.586
10	Jaco Nel	South Africa	4:12.794
11	Victor Hugo Garrido Marquez	Venezuela	4:13.127
12	Arnold Boldt	Canada	4:13.458

== Finals ==
Gold medal match

Name	Time	Rank
Liang Guihua (CHN)	3:45.243 WR	1st place, gold medalist(s)
Tobias Graf (GER)	3:48.248	2nd place, silver medalist(s)

Bronze medal match

Name	Time	Rank
Laurent Thirionet (FRA)	3:53.547	3rd place, bronze medalist(s)
Colin Lynch (IRL)	3:53.667	4
