= Heike Friedrich (wheelchair basketball) =

German wheelchair basketball player (born 1976)

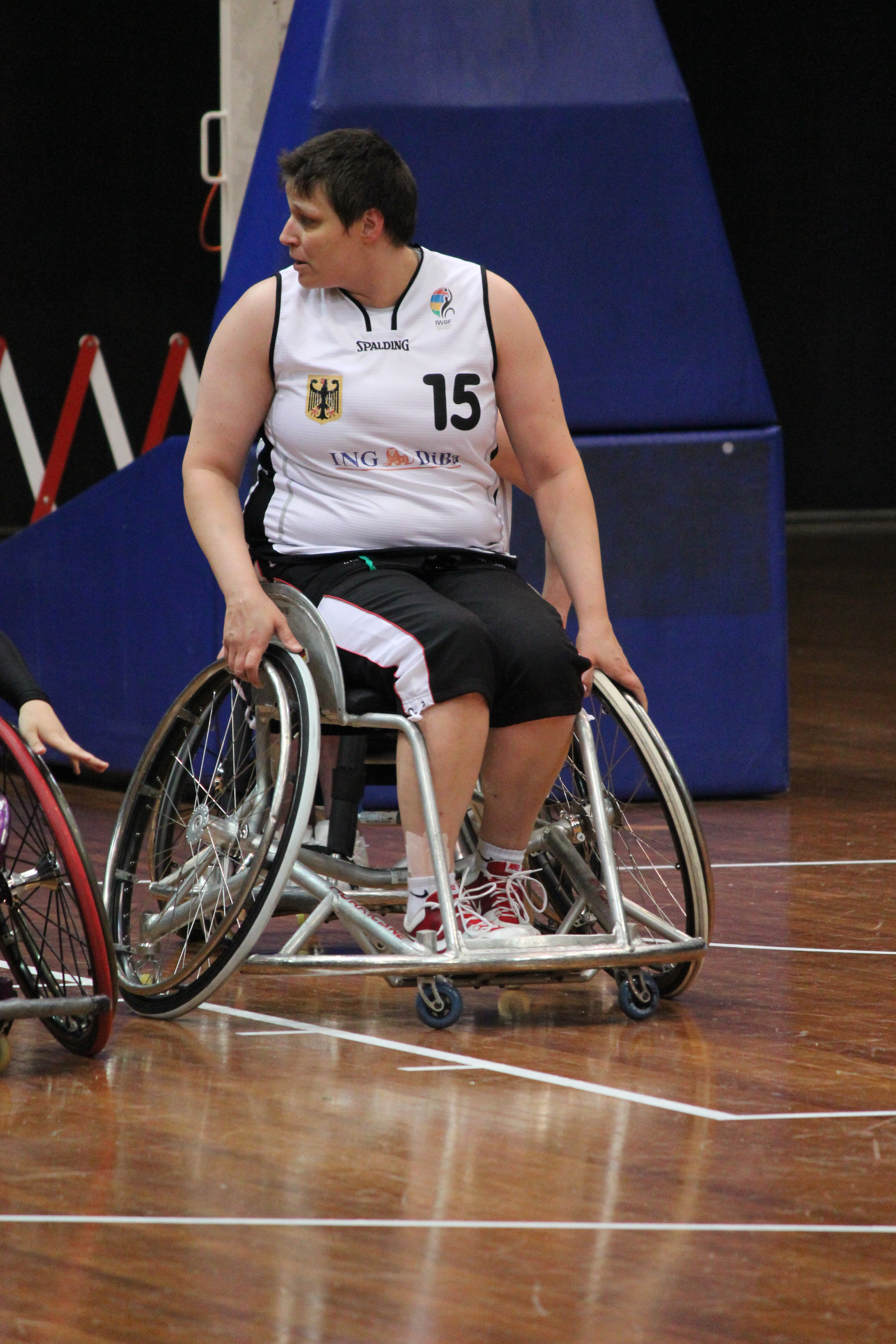
- Friedrich at the Gliders and Rollers World Challenge in Sydney, July 2012

Personal information
- Nickname: Hightower
- Nationality: Germany
- Born: 14 June 1976 (age 50)
- Height: 191 cm (6 ft 3 in)

Sport
- Country: Germany
- Sport: Basketball; Wheelchair basketball
- Disability class: 4.5
- Event: Women's team
- Team: Mainhatten Skywheelers
- Coached by: Holger Glinicki

Achievements and titles
- Paralympic finals: 2012 Summer Paralympics
Medal record
Women's wheelchair basketball
Paralympic Games
Gold medal – first place	2012 London	Team competition
World Championships
Silver medal – second place	2010 Birmingham	Team competition
Silver medal – second place	2014 Toronto	Team competition
European Championships
Gold medal – first place	2009 Stoke Mandeville	Team competition
Gold medal – first place	2011 Nazareth	Team competition
Silver medal – second place	2013 Frankfurt	Team competition
Gold medal – first place	2015 Worcester	Team competition

Heike Friedrich (born 14 June 1976) is a German 4.5 point wheelchair basketball player, who plays for the Mainhatten Skywheelers. She was a professional basketball player who played for TuS Lichterfeld, Wild Cats Aschaffenburg, TV Langen und TV Hofheim. She was with the Bundesliga club TV Langen for five years, and the Germany women's national basketball team for nine years, playing 204 international games. Since taking up wheelchair basketball in 2006, she has played with the German national team which won European titles in 2009 and 2011, and was runner-up in 2013. The team was also runner-up at the IWBF World Championship in Birmingham in 2010, and won a gold medal at the 2012 Summer Paralympics in London. President Joachim Gauck awarded the team Germany's highest sporting honour, the Silbernes Lorbeerblatt (Silver Laurel Leaf).

== Biography ==
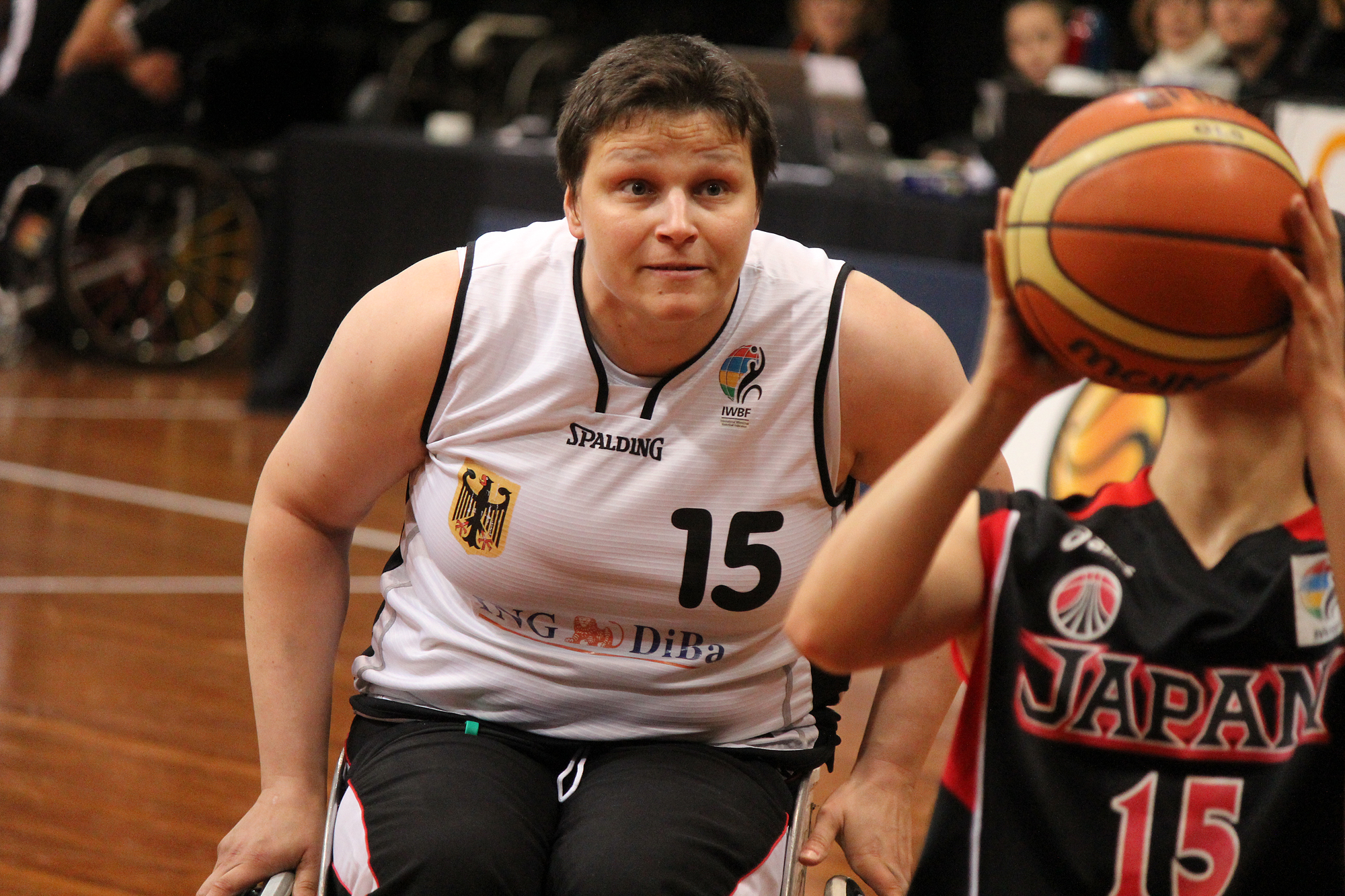
Heike Friedrich in a match against Japan in Sydney, July 2012

Heike Friedrich was born in Berlin on 14 June 1976. She was a professional basketball player who played for TuS Lichterfeld, Wild Cats Aschaffenburg, TV Langen und TV Hofheim. She was with the Bundesliga club TV Langen for five years, and the Germany women's national basketball team for nine years, playing 204 international games. She injured her right knee in a game in Saarlouis in 1995. After a series of X-rays, scans and MRIs, she had surgery on the knee at Martin Luther Hospital in Berlin. She returned to playing, but problems and complications occurred, and her cruciate ligaments tore. She had surgery eight more times. By 2006, her lower right calf muscles had become partly paralysed due to nerve damage.

Friedrich began playing wheelchair basketball on 2006. In 2007, she joined Team 99 Aschaffenburg. Since 2009, she has played for the Mainhatten Skywheelers in Frankfurt. Classified as a 4.5 point player, Friedrich plays center. She joined the national wheelchair basketball team, which was coached by Holger Glinicki, in 2009, playing in the European Wheelchair Basketball Championship at Stoke Mandeville in Great Britain in the August of that year. The German team went on to become silver medallists at the Wheelchair Basketball World Championship in Birmingham in 2010.

She was part of the team that won the European Championships in Nazareth, Israel, in 2011, thereby qualifying for the 2012 Summer Paralympic Games in London. As part of the team's preparation, they toured the United States and Australia. In the Gold Medal match in London, the team faced the Australia women's national wheelchair basketball team, who had defeated them 48–46 in Sydney just a few months before, in front of a capacity crowd of over 12,000 at the North Greenwich Arena.

The German team had been undefeated up to that point, but had started off slow in its games against the United States and China, winning these games by six-point margins, and seemed to play its best basketball only in the final minutes of a game. They defeated the Australians 44–58 in front of a crowd of over 12,000 at the North Greenwich Arena to win the gold medal, the first that Germany had won in women's wheelchair basketball since 1984. They were awarded Germany's highest sporting honour, the Silbernes Lorbeerblatt (Silver Laurel Leaf) by President Joachim Gauck in November 2012, and were named Team of the Year for 2012.

The German team lost the European Championship to the Netherlands before a home town crowd of 2,300 in Frankfurt in July 2013 by one point, 56–57. At the 2014 Women's World Wheelchair Basketball Championship in Toronto, Canada, in June 2014, the team won silver after being defeated by Canada in the final.

== Achievements ==
- 2009: Gold European Championships (Stoke Mandeville, Great Britain)
- 2010: Silver World Championships (Birmingham, Great Britain)
- 2011: Gold at the European Championships (Nazareth, Israel)
- 2012: Gold at the Paralympic Games (London, England)
- 2013: Silver at the European Championships (Frankfurt, Germany)
- 2014: Silver at the World Championships (Toronto, Canada)
- 2015: Gold at the European Championships (Worcester, England)

== Awards ==
- 2012: Team of the Year
- 2012: Silver Laurel Leaf
