= Equestrian at the 2008 Summer Paralympics – Individual championship test grade III =

Individual Championship Test Grade III at the XIII Paralympic Games
- Paralympic Equestrian
- Venue: Hong Kong Olympic Equestrian Centre
- Dates: 9 September 2008
- Competitors: 12 from 10 nations

Medalists
| 1st place, gold medalist(s) | | Hannelore Brenner | Germany |
| 2nd place, silver medalist(s) | | Annika Lykke Dalskov | Denmark |
| 3rd place, bronze medalist(s) | | Bettina Eistel | Germany |

The Equestrian Individual Championship Test Grade III event at the 2008 Summer Paralympics was held in the Hong Kong Olympic Equestrian Centre on 9 September at 19:04.

The competition was assessed by a ground jury composed of five judges placed at locations designated E, H, C, M, and B. Each judge rated the competitors' performances with a percentage score. The five scores from the jury were then averaged to determine a rider's total percentage score.

The event was won by Hannelore Brenner, representing Germany.

== Ground jury ==
| Judge at E | Gudrun Hofinga ( Germany) |
| Judge at H | Alison Mastin ( Ireland) |
| Judge at C | Janet Geary ( Australia), jury president |
| Judge at M | Tarja Huttunen ( Finland) |
| Judge at B | Anne Prain ( France) |

== Results ==
T = Team Member (see Equestrian at the 2008 Summer Paralympics – Team).

| Rank | Rider | Horse | Percentage score (and rank) | | | | | Total % score | Note |
| Rank | Rider | Horse | E | H | C | M | B | Total % score | Note |
|---|---|---|---|---|---|---|---|---|---|
| 1st place, gold medalist(s) | Hannelore Brenner (GER) | Women Of The World | 74.000 (1) | 69.200 (2) | 72.400 (1) | 71.200 (2) | 70.400 (2) | 71.440 | T |
| 2nd place, silver medalist(s) | Annika Lykke Dalskov (DEN) | Alfarvad April Z | 70.000 (3) | 72.800 (1) | 69.200 (4) | 70.000 (3) | 73.200 (1) | 71.040 | T |
| 3rd place, bronze medalist(s) | Bettina Eistel (GER) | Fabuleux 5 | 72.400 (2) | 66.800 (4) | 72.000 (2) | 73.600 (1) | 69.600 (3) | 70.880 | |
| 4 | Sharon Jarvis (AUS) | Odorado | 68.400 (4) | 68.800 (3) | 70.800 (3) | 69.200 (5) | 68.800 (5) | 69.200 | T |
| 5 | Deborah Criddle (GBR) | Pavaroti | 67.600 (5) | 64.800 (5) | 69.200 (4) | 69.600 (4) | 69.600 (3) | 68.160 | |
| 6 | Silvia Veratti (ITA) | Balla Coi Lupi | 63.600 (6) | 64.400 (7) | 64.000 (7) | 66.800 (6) | 64.000 (7) | 64.560 | T |
| 7 | Bert Vermeir (BEL) | Tiramisu | 62.400 (8) | 64.800 (5) | 64.800 (6) | 63.600 (7) | 64.400 (6) | 64.000 | |
| 8 | Simon Laurens (GBR) | Ocean Diamond | 63.200 (7) | 64.000 (8) | 63.200 (8) | 62.000 (8) | 62.000 (8) | 62.880 | T |
| 9 | Silje Gillund (NOR) | Dundee Klint | 58.000 (9) | 61.200 (9) | 60.000 (10) | 57.200 (10) | 57.200 (10) | 58.720 | |
| 10 | Barbara Grassmyer (USA) | Mibis | 58.000 (9) | 56.000 (10) | 57.600 (11) | 56.400 (11) | 57.600 (9) | 57.120 | T |
| 11 | Gabriella Lof (SWE) | Oleander | 57.200 (11) | 53.200 (11) | 60.400 (9) | 59.600 (9) | 54.400 (11) | 56.960 | T |
| 12 | Yutaka Shibuya (JPN) | Elegance | 50.000 (12) | 47.600 (12) | 48.000 (12) | 48.800 (12) | 47.200 (12) | 48.320 | |
