= Vico Merklein =

German paracyclist

Personal information
- Nationality: German
- Born: 12 August 1977 (age 48)

Sport
- Sport: Para-cycling
- Disability class: H3
Medal record
Men's Para-cycling
Representing Germany
Paralympic Games
| Gold medal – first place | 2016 Rio | Road race H4 |
| Silver medal – second place | 2012 London | Road race H3 |
| Silver medal – second place | 2020 Tokyo | Time trial H3 |
| Bronze medal – third place | 2016 Rio | Time trial H4 |
Road World Championships
| Bronze medal – third place | 2023 Glasgow | Road race H3 |

Vico Merklein (born 12 August 1977) is a paracyclist who medaled in Cycling at the 2012 Summer Paralympics and the 2016 Summer Paralympics. He also represented Germany at the 2020 Summer Paralympics.
