= Equestrian at the 2012 Summer Paralympics – Individual championship test grade III =

Equestrian – Individual championship test, grade III at the XIV Paralympic Games
- Venue: Greenwich Park
- Date: 2 September 2012
- Competitors: 12 from 9 nations
- Winning score: 73.467

Medalists
1st place, gold medalist(s)		Hannelore Brenner	Germany
2nd place, silver medalist(s)		Deborah Criddle	Great Britain
3rd place, bronze medalist(s)		Annika Dalskov	Denmark

The individual championship test, grade III, para-equestrian dressage event at the 2012 Summer Paralympics was contested on 2 September at Greenwich Park in London.

The competition was assessed by a ground jury composed of five judges placed at locations designated E, H, C, M, and B. Each judge rated the competitors' performances with a percentage score. The five scores from the jury were then averaged to determine a rider's total percentage score.

== Ground jury ==
Judge at E	Freddy Leyman ( Belgium)
Judge at H	Kjell Myhre ( Norway)
Judge at C	Gudrun Hofinga ( Germany), jury president
Judge at M	Carlos Lopes ( Portugal)
Judge at B	Sarah Rodger ( Great Britain)

== Results ==
T = Team Member (see Equestrian at the 2012 Summer Paralympics – Team).

Rank	Rider	Horse	Percentage score (and rank)					Total % score	Note
Rank	Rider	Horse	E	H	C	M	B	Total % score	Note
1st place, gold medalist(s)	Hannelore Brenner (GER)	Women of the World	70.167 (4)	75.000 (1)	76.167 (1)	74.833 (1)	71.167 (1)	73.467	T
2nd place, silver medalist(s)	Deborah Criddle (GBR)	LJT Akilles	72.833 (3)	71.333 (2)	70.167 (5)	72.500 (2)	69.500 (2)	71.267	T
3rd place, bronze medalist(s)	Annika Dalskov (DEN)	Aros A Fenris	76.333 (1)	70.667 (3)	70.167 (5)	71.500 (3)	67.500 (5)	71.233	T
4	Susanne Sunesen (DEN)	Thy's Que Faire	73.833 (2)	67.500 (7)	74.667 (2)	65.000 (8)	67.500 (5)	69.700	T
5	Sanne Voets (NED)	Vedet PB	69.333 (5)	70.000 (4)	70.833 (3)	68.333 (4)	65.333 (8)	68.767	T
6	Jose Letartre (FRA)	Warina	64.833 (10)	68.167 (5)	70.667 (4)	67.000 (6)	68.333 (3)	67.800	T
7	Vladimir Vinchon (FRA)	Flipper d'Or	66.833 (7)	67.667 (6)	69.167 (7)	67.500 (5)	66.000 (7)	67.433	T
8	Steffen Zeibig (GER)	Waldemar	65.500 (9)	63.500 (9)	69.000 (8)	64.833 (9)	68.333 (3)	66.233	T
9	Rachel Stock (NZL)	Rimini Park Emmerich	66.500 (8)	66.000 (8)	65.333 (10)	66.000 (7)	64.833 (9)	65.733	
10	Yonatan Dresler (ISR)	Ubelisk	67.667 (6)	63.167 (10)	68.000 (9)	63.333 (10)	64.500 (10)	65.333	
11	Patricio Guglialmelli Lynch (ARG)	Nirvana Pure Indulgence	59.667 (11)	57.333 (11)	60.000 (11)	62.667 (11)	61.333 (11)	60.200	
	Anne Cecilie Ore (NOR)	Ballantine	Withdrawn						T
