= Equestrian at the 2012 Summer Paralympics – Individual freestyle test grade III =

Equestrian – Individual freestyle test, grade III at the XIV Paralympic Games
- Venue: Greenwich Park
- Date: 4 September 2012
- Competitors: 11 from 8 nations
- Winning score: 81.700

Medalists
1st place, gold medalist(s)		Hannelore Brenner	Germany
2nd place, silver medalist(s)		Deborah Criddle	Great Britain
3rd place, bronze medalist(s)		Annika Dalskov	Denmark

The individual freestyle test, grade III, para-equestrian dressage event at the 2012 Summer Paralympics was contested on 4 September at Greenwich Park in London.

The competition was assessed by a ground jury composed of five judges placed at locations designated E, H, C, M, and B. Each judge rated the competitors' performances with percentage scores for technical difficulty and artistic merit. The ten scores from the jury were then averaged to determine a rider's total percentage score.

== Ground jury ==
Judge at E	Sarah Rodger ( Great Britain)
Judge at H	Anne Prain ( France)
Judge at C	Carlos Lopes ( Portugal), jury president
Judge at M	Lilian Iannone ( Argentina)
Judge at B	Kjell Myhre ( Norway)

== Results ==
Rank	Rider	Horse		Technical/Artistic & (Rank)					Tech/Art % (Rk)	Total % score
Rank	Rider	Horse		E	H	C	M	B	Tech/Art % (Rk)	Total % score
1st place, gold medalist(s)	Hannelore Brenner (GER)	Women of the World		77.000 (1)	84.500 (1)	80.750 (1)	85.250 (1)	81.000 (1)		81.700
1st place, gold medalist(s)	Hannelore Brenner (GER)	Women of the World	Tech:	75.500 (1)	81.500 (1)	79.000 (1)	81.500 (1)	78.000 (1)	79.100 (1)	
1st place, gold medalist(s)	Hannelore Brenner (GER)	Women of the World	Art:	78.500 (1)	87.500 (1)	82.500 (1)	89.000 (1)	84.000 (1)	84.300 (1)	
2nd place, silver medalist(s)	Deborah Criddle (GBR)	LJT Akilles		74.500 (3)	80.250 (3)	80.250 (2)	79.750 (2)	78.000 (2)		78.550
2nd place, silver medalist(s)	Deborah Criddle (GBR)	LJT Akilles	Tech:	71.500 (3)	78.000 (3)	78.000 (2)	78.000 (2)	75.000 (2)	76.100 (2)	
2nd place, silver medalist(s)	Deborah Criddle (GBR)	LJT Akilles	Art:	77.500 (2)	82.500 (2)	82.500 (1)	81.500 (3)	81.000 (2)	81.000 (2)	
3rd place, bronze medalist(s)	Annika Dalskov (DEN)	Aros A Fenris		72.000 (4)	81.000 (2)	77.000 (3)	77.250 (3)	77.500 (3)		76.950
3rd place, bronze medalist(s)	Annika Dalskov (DEN)	Aros A Fenris	Tech:	70.500 (4)	79.500 (2)	75.500 (3)	77.000 (3)	74.000 (3)	75.300 (3)	
3rd place, bronze medalist(s)	Annika Dalskov (DEN)	Aros A Fenris	Art:	73.500 (4)	82.500 (2)	78.500 (3)	77.500 (4)	81.000 (2)	78.600 (3)	
4	Sanne Voets (NED)	Vedet PB		75.500 (2)	76.750 (5)	74.500 (5)	76.250 (5)	74.000 (4)		75.400
4	Sanne Voets (NED)	Vedet PB	Tech:	73.500 (2)	73.000 (6)	71.500 (5)	76.500 (4)	69.500 (6)	72.800 (4)	
4	Sanne Voets (NED)	Vedet PB	Art:	77.500 (2)	80.500 (4)	77.500 (4)	76.000 (5)	78.500 (4)	78.000 (4)	
5	Susanne Sunesen (DEN)	Thy's Que Faire		70.000 (6)	77.250 (4)	70.750 (7)	76.750 (4)	73.000 (6)		73.550
5	Susanne Sunesen (DEN)	Thy's Que Faire	Tech:	69.000 (6)	74.500 (4)	68.000 (8)	71.500 (5)	71.500 (4)	70.900 (6)	
5	Susanne Sunesen (DEN)	Thy's Que Faire	Art:	71.000 (6)	80.000 (5)	73.500 (6)	82.000 (2)	74.500 (7)	76.200 (5)	
6	Jose Letartre (FRA)	Warina		70.500 (5)	75.750 (6)	75.750 (4)	67.000 (7)	74.000 (4)		72.600
6	Jose Letartre (FRA)	Warina	Tech:	69.500 (5)	74.500 (4)	74.000 (4)	67.500 (7)	71.500 (4)	71.400 (5)	
6	Jose Letartre (FRA)	Warina	Art:	71.500 (5)	77.000 (6)	77.500 (4)	66.500 (7)	76.500 (5)	73.800 (6)	
7	Vladimir Vinchon (FRA)	Flipper d'Or		66.500 (8)	70.750 (7)	71.750 (6)	60.500 (10)	72.000 (7)		68.300
7	Vladimir Vinchon (FRA)	Flipper d'Or	Tech:	65.500 (7)	70.000 (7)	70.500 (6)	58.500 (11)	69.000 (7)	66.700 (7)	
7	Vladimir Vinchon (FRA)	Flipper d'Or	Art:	67.500 (8)	71.500 (7)	73.000 (7)	62.500 (8)	75.000 (6)	69.900 (7)	
8	Steffen Zeibig (GER)	Waldemar		67.250 (7)	65.750 (9)	66.500 (9)	69.750 (6)	66.500 (9)		67.150
8	Steffen Zeibig (GER)	Waldemar	Tech:	65.000 (8)	64.500 (9)	65.500 (9)	69.500 (6)	64.500 (9)	65.800 (9)	
8	Steffen Zeibig (GER)	Waldemar	Art:	69.500 (7)	67.000 (9)	67.500 (9)	70.000 (6)	68.500 (8)	68.500 (8)	
9	Rachel Stock (NZL)	Rimini Park Emmerich		64.750 (9)	69.500 (8)	70.000 (8)	62.750 (8)	67.250 (8)		66.850
9	Rachel Stock (NZL)	Rimini Park Emmerich	Tech:	64.500 (9)	69.000 (8)	68.500 (7)	63.000 (8)	66.000 (8)	66.200 (8)	
9	Rachel Stock (NZL)	Rimini Park Emmerich	Art:	65.000 (9)	70.000 (8)	71.500 (8)	62.500 (8)	68.500 (8)	67.500 (9)	
10	Patricio Guglialmelli Lynch (ARG)	Nirvana Pure Indulgence		61.250 (10)	60.750 (11)	63.750 (10)	60.750 (9)	63.750 (10)		62.050
10	Patricio Guglialmelli Lynch (ARG)	Nirvana Pure Indulgence	Tech:	61.500 (10)	61.500 (11)	64.500 (10)	63.000 (8)	63.000 (10)	62.700 (10)	
10	Patricio Guglialmelli Lynch (ARG)	Nirvana Pure Indulgence	Art:	61.000 (10)	60.000 (11)	63.000 (10)	58.500 (10)	64.500 (10)	61.400 (10)	
11	Yonatan Dresler (ISR)	Ubelisk		59.000 (11)	62.000 (10)	61.500 (11)	58.750 (11)	60.000 (11)		60.250
11	Yonatan Dresler (ISR)	Ubelisk	Tech:	61.000 (11)	62.500 (10)	63.500 (11)	60.000 (10)	61.000 (11)	61.600 (11)	
11	Yonatan Dresler (ISR)	Ubelisk	Art:	57.000 (11)	61.500 (10)	59.500 (11)	57.500 (11)	59.000 (11)	58.900 (11)	
