= Cycling at the 2012 Summer Paralympics – Men's road race H3 =

Cycling, Men's road race H3 at the XIV Paralympic Games
- Venue: Brands Hatch
- Dates: September 7, 2012
- Competitors: 10 from 8 nations

Medalists
1st place, gold medalist(s)		Rafał Wilk	Poland
2nd place, silver medalist(s)		Vico Merklein	Germany
3rd place, bronze medalist(s)		Joël Jeannot	France

The Men's road race H3 cycling event at the 2012 Summer Paralympics took place on September 7 at Brands Hatch. Ten riders from eight nations competed. The race distance was 64 km.

== Results ==
LAP=Lapped (8 km). DNF=Did Not Finish.

Rank	Name	Country	Time
1st place, gold medalist(s)	Rafał Wilk	Poland	1:50:05
2nd place, silver medalist(s)	Vico Merklein	Germany	1:51:34
3rd place, bronze medalist(s)	Joël Jeannot	France	1:53:37
4	Nigel Barley	Australia	1:58:03
5	Arkadiusz Skrzypinski	Poland	1:59:29
6	Bernd Jeffre	Germany	2:01:19
7	Thomas Gerlach	Denmark	2:03:49
	Gaysli Leon	Haiti	LAP
	Mark Ledo	Canada	DNF
	Mauro Cratassa	Italy	DNF
