= Cycling at the 2012 Summer Paralympics – Men's road time trial H4 =

Cycling, Men's road time trial H4 at the XIV Paralympic Games
- Venue: Brands Hatch
- Dates: September 5, 2012
- Competitors: 10 from 9 nations

Medalists
1st place, gold medalist(s)		Alex Zanardi	Italy
2nd place, silver medalist(s)		Norbert Mosandl	Germany
3rd place, bronze medalist(s)		Oscar Sanchez	United States

The Men's time trial H4 road cycling event at the 2012 Summer Paralympics took place on September 5 at Brands Hatch. Ten riders from nine different nations competed. The race distance was 16 km. The race was won by former F1 driver Alex Zanardi.

== Results ==
Rank	Name	Country	Time
1st place, gold medalist(s)	Alex Zanardi	Italy	24:50.22
2nd place, silver medalist(s)	Norbert Mosandl	Germany	25:17.40
3rd place, bronze medalist(s)	Oscar Sanchez	United States	25:35.26
4	Wim Decleir	Belgium	26:24.00
5	Ernst van Dyk	South Africa	26:35.95
6	Johan Reekers	Netherlands	27:06.99
7	Nati Groberg	Israel	27:30.04
8	Jetze Plat	Netherlands	27:40.50
9	Stuart Tripp	Australia	27:47.62
10	Lassane Gasbeogo	Burkina Faso	34:28.49
