= Hannelore Brenner =

German Paralympic equestrian

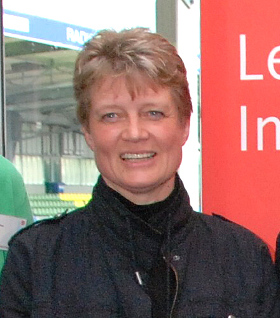

Personal information
- Nationality: German
- Born: 21 June 1963 (age 63) Lüneburg, West Germany
Medal record
Para equestrian
Representing Germany
Paralympic Games
Silver medal – second place	2004 Athens	Ind. freestyle test grade II
Gold medal – first place	2008 Beijing	Ind. championship test grade III
Gold medal – first place	2008 Beijing	Ind. freestyle test grade III
Silver medal – second place	2008 Beijing	Team
Gold medal – first place	2012 London	Ind. championship test grade III
Gold medal – first place	2012 London	Ind. freestyle test grade III
Silver medal – second place	2012 London	Team

Hannelore Brenner (born 21 June 1963) is a German Paralympian dressage equestrian athlete.

== Life ==
Brenner was born in Lüneburg in 1963. She was a keen horse rider until a severe fall left her paraplegic.

Brenner took up horse riding again for leisure but then turned to competition. At the Athens Paralympics she took the Silver medal for Individual Freestyle. In 2008 in Beijing she took a Gold medal in both the Individual and the Individual Freestyle as well as gaining a team silver medal. In 2010 at the World Championships she again took Gold in both the Individual and the Individual Freestyle.

At the paralympics in London in 2012 she again won two gold medals and a team silver riding her horse Women of the World.
