= Johanna Welin =

German wheelchair basketball player

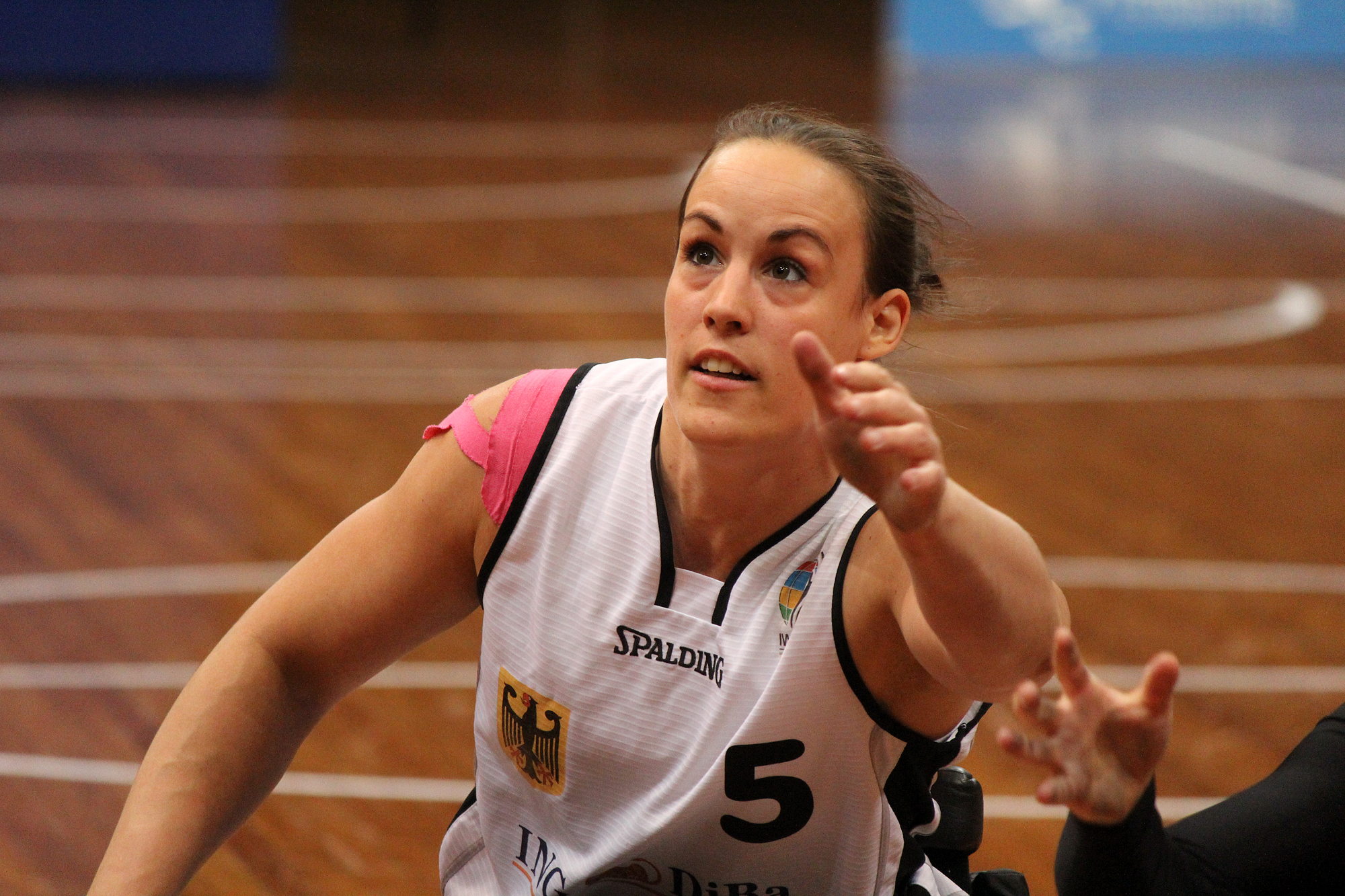
- Johanna Welin

Personal information
- Born: 24 June 1984 (age 42) Pajala, Sweden

Sport
- Country: Germany
- Sport: Wheelchair basketball
- Disability class: 2.0
- Event: Women's team
- Team: USC Munich

Achievements and titles
- Paralympic finals: 2012 Summer Paralympics, 2016 Paralympics
Medal record
Women's wheelchair basketball
Representing Germany
Paralympic Games
| Gold medal – first place | 2012 London | Team competition |
| Silver medal – second place | 2016 Rio de Janeiro | Team competition |
IWBF World Championship
| Silver medal – second place | 2014 Toronto | Team competition |
| Bronze medal – third place | 2018 Hamburg | Team competition |

Johanna Welin (born 24 June 1984) is a Swedish-born German 2.0 point wheelchair basketball player. She played for USC Munich in the German wheelchair basketball league, and for the national team that won the gold medal at the 2012 Summer Paralympics in London, after which President Joachim Gauck awarded the team with the Silbernes Lorbeerblatt (Silver Laurel Leaf).

== Biography ==
Johanna Welin was born on 24 June 1984 in Pajala, Sweden, a small town near the border between Sweden and Finland about 100 kilometres (62 mi) north of the Arctic Circle. She has played football for Töreboda IK in the Swedish league. In the winter, her passion was snowboarding, until a bad fall in a snowboarding competition at Gothenburg in January 2004 left her paralysed from the waist down. She then took up wheelchair basketball, playing for GRBK Gothenburg in the Swedish league, but Sweden had no national women's team. She spent two semesters studying German in Innsbruck, but there was no wheelchair basketball team there, and she began playing for USC Munich, initially for their second team. There, she caught the attention of Holger Glinicki, the coach of the German national team, who asked her if she would like to play for the German national team. She took German citizenship, a relatively painless procedure for an athlete, and made the German national team, which went on to win gold at the 2011 European Championships in Nazareth, Israel, defeating the Netherlands in the final, 48–42.

In June 2012 she was named as part of the team that competed at the 2012 Summer Paralympic Games in London, where they faced the Australia women's national wheelchair basketball team, a team that had defeated them 48–46 in Sydney just a few months before. They defeated the Australians 44–58 in front of a capacity crowd of over 12,000 at the North Greenwich Arena to win the gold medal, the first that Germany had won in women's wheelchair basketball at the Paralympics since 1984. They were awarded another Silver Laurel Leaf by President Joachim Gauck in November 2012 and were again named Team of the Year for 2012. In February 2013, Welin's name was entered in the Golden Book of Munich. The German team claimed silver at the 2014 Women's World Wheelchair Basketball Championship in Toronto, Ontario, Canada, and beat the Netherlands in the 2015 European Championships, to claim its tenth European title. At the 2016 Paralympic Games, it won silver after losing the final to the United States.

She has modelled for the advertising campaigns of team sponsors ING DiBa and LoFric, and is currently studying medicine in Munich.

== Achievements ==
- 2011: Gold European Championships (Nazareth, Israel)
- 2012: Gold Paralympic Games (London, England)
- 2013: Silver European Championships (Frankfurt, Germany)
- 2014: Silver at the World Championships (Toronto, Canada)
- 2015: Gold at the European Championships (Worcester, England)
- 2016: Silver at the Paralympic Games (Rio de Janeiro, Brazil)

== Awards ==
- 2012: Team of the Year
- 2012: Silver Laurel Leaf
- 2013: Entry in the Golden Book of Munich
Sydney July 2012
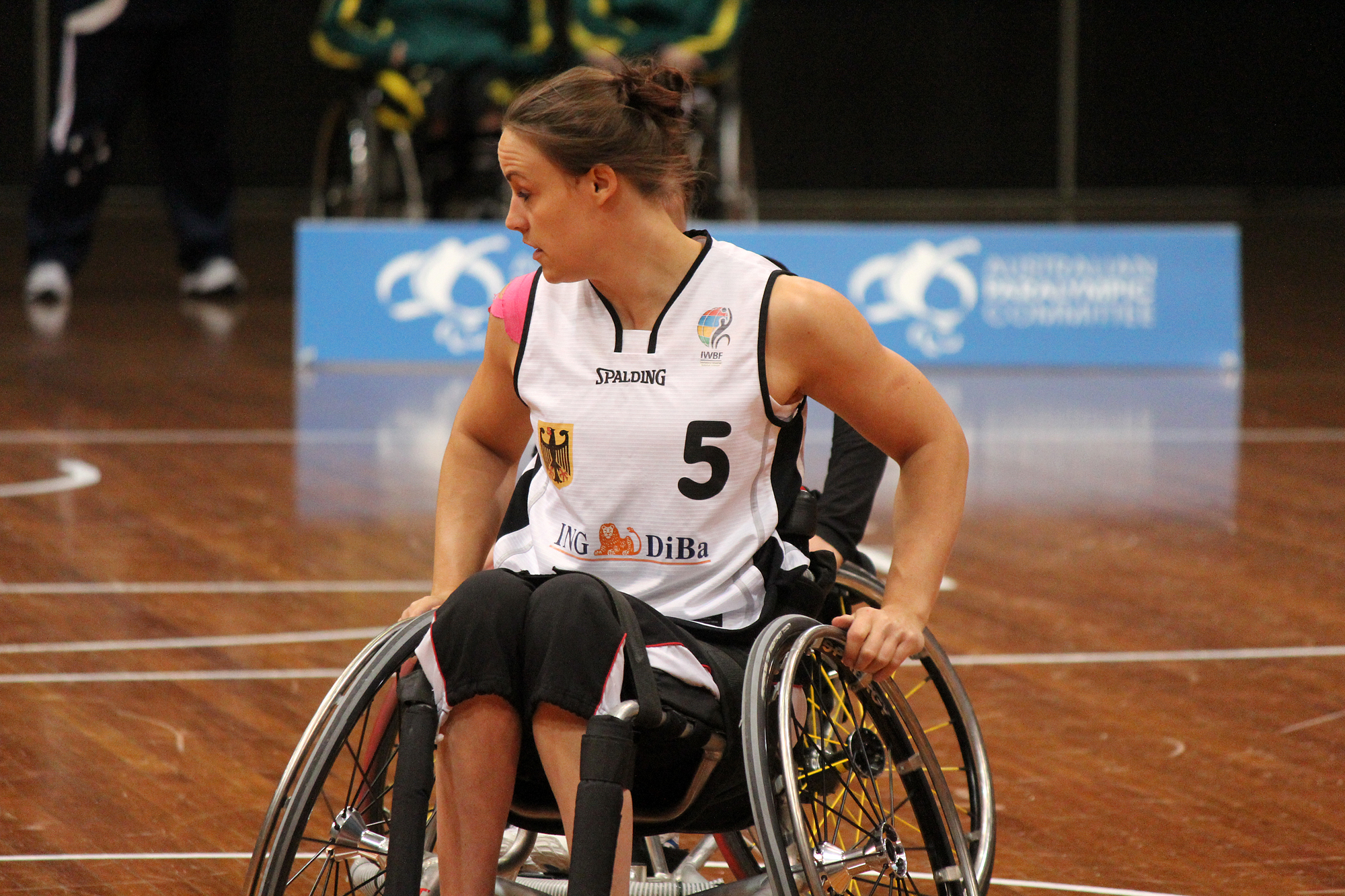
Johanna Welin in the game against Japan

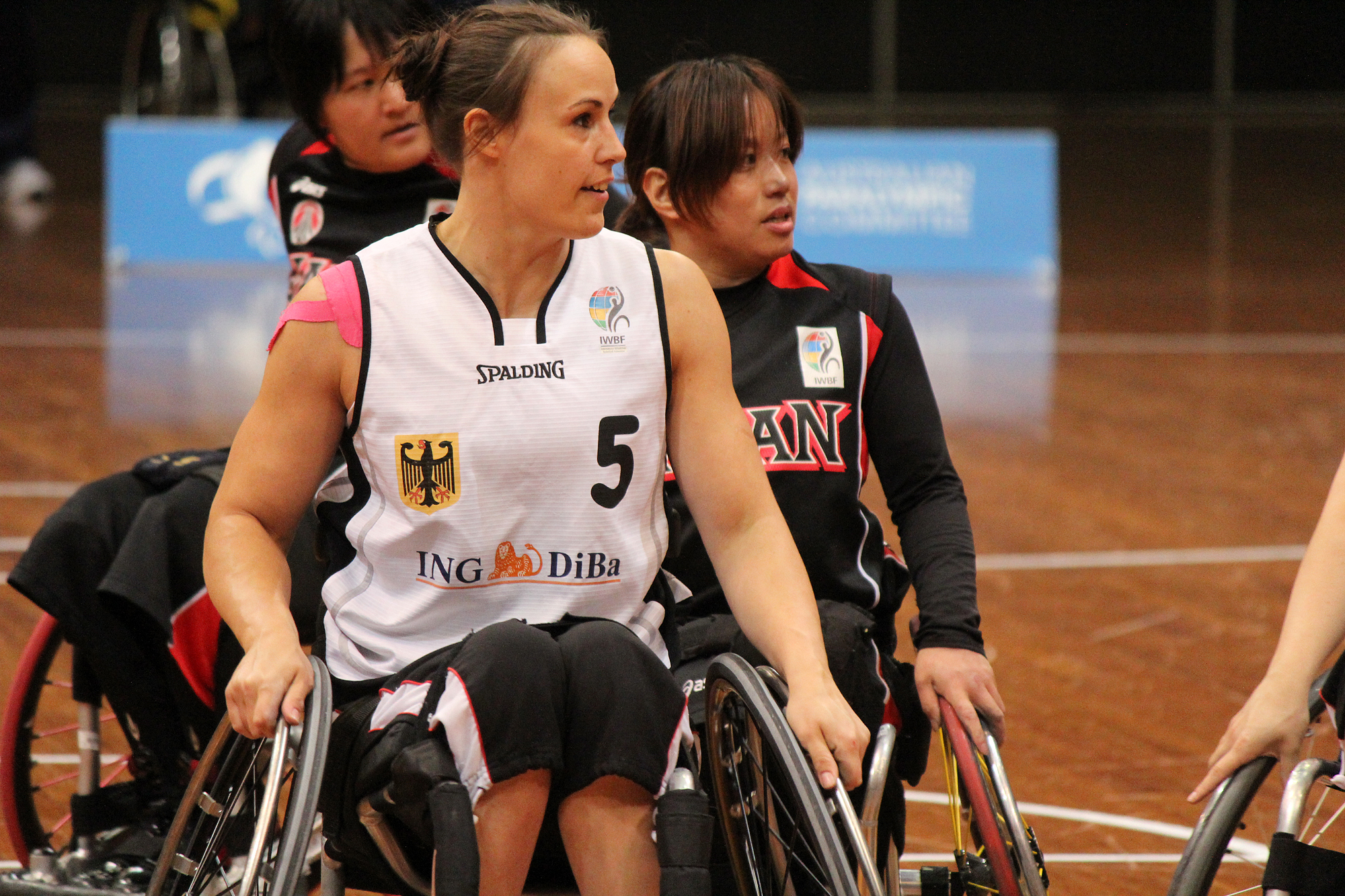
Johanna Welin in the game against Japan

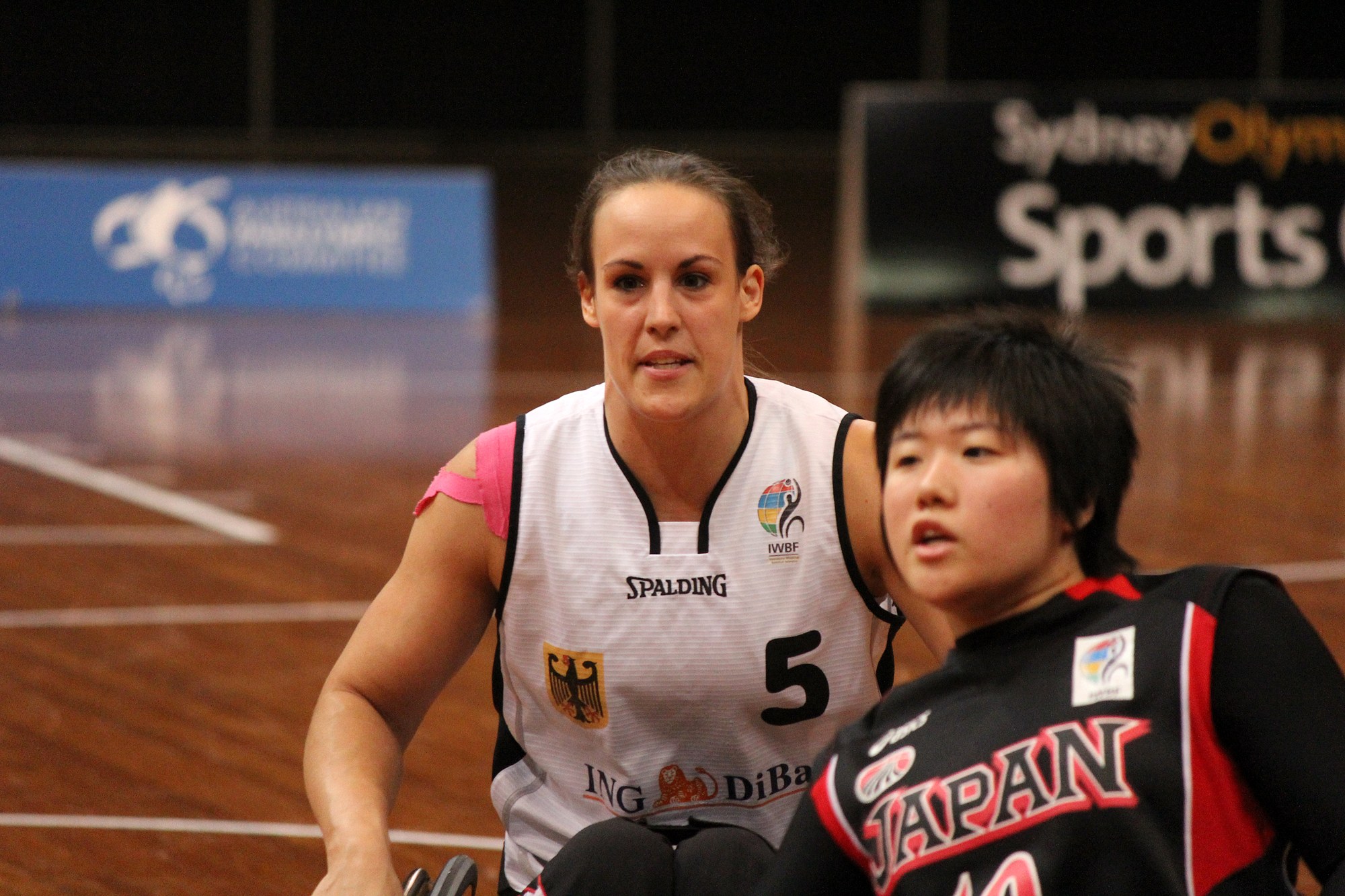
Johanna Welin in the game against Japan
