= Maria Kühn =

German wheelchair basketball player (born 1982)

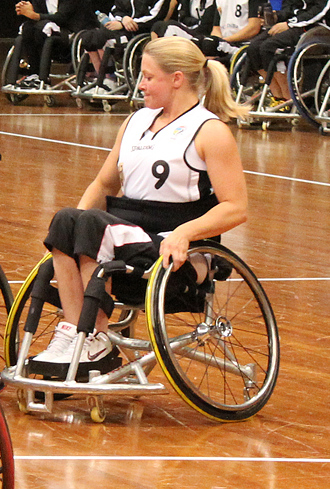
- Kühn in Sydney, July 2012

Personal information
- Nickname: Ria
- Born: 14 February 1982 (age 44) Dresden, Germany

Sport
- Country: Germany
- Sport: Wheelchair basketball
- Disability class: 1.0
- Event: Women's team
- Team: SV Reha Augsburg
- Coached by: Birgit Meitner

Achievements and titles
- Paralympic finals: 2012 Summer Paralympics
Medal record
Women's wheelchair basketball
Representing Germany
Paralympic Games
Gold medal – first place	2012 London	Team competition
IWBF World Championship
Silver medal – second place	2010 Birmingham	Team competition

Maria Kühn (born 14 February 1982) is a 1.0-point wheelchair basketball player who plays for SV Reha Augsburg in the German wheelchair basketball league. She has also played in the German national team, with which she won two European titles, was runner-up at 2010 World Championships, and won a gold medal at the 2012 Summer Paralympics in London. Having won the gold medal, President Joachim Gauck awarded the team the Silbernes Lorbeerblatt (Silver Laurel Leaf), Germany's highest sporting honour.

== Personal ==
Kühn was born in Dresden, Germany, on 14 February 1982. At the age of 20, after finishing high school, she took a holiday in the United States. While horseback riding in Monument Valley, she had a bad fall and became paralysed from the fifth thoracic vertebra down.

She earned a degree in management student from the Baden-Württemberg Cooperative State University (DHBW). Since 2011, she has worked in Human Resources at the Gesellschaft für Technische Überwachung (GTÜ) (Society for Technical Supervision).

== Wheelchair basketball ==
Kühn is a 1.0-point wheelchair basketball player. Before her accident, she was physically active with swimming, cycling and running. Afterwards, she took up wheelchair dancing as a form of exercise, but later switched to wheelchair basketball, although she had never been much interested in ball sports. She moved to Ludwigsburg to play for SV Reha Augsburg in the German national league in 2009, but switched to the Frankfurt Mainhatten Skywheelers for the 2011/12 season. Since 2009, her coach has been Brigit Meitner.

Kühn joined the national team in 2009, while in Stuttgart, where she now lives. On 11 July 2009 during the International Paralympic Day celebration in Berlin, the team showed up at the Brandenburg Gate before 58,000 visitors, and Kühn gave President Horst Köhler a demonstration of the sport. The team won gold at the European Wheelchair Basketball Championship in Stoke Mandeville, England, in 2009, and silver at the Wheelchair Basketball World Championship in Birmingham, England the following year. In 2011, they again won the European Championship, which this time was held in Nazareth, Israel.

In June 2012, Kühn was named as one of the team that competed at the 2012 Summer Paralympic Games in London. In the Gold Medal match, the team faced the Australia women's national wheelchair basketball team, a team that had defeated them 48–46 in Sydney just a few months before. They defeated the Australians 44–58 in front of a capacity crowd of over 12,000 at the North Greenwich Arena to win the gold medal, the first that Germany had won in women's wheelchair basketball at the Paralympic Games since Stoke Mandeville in 1984. They were awarded a Silbernes Lorbeerblatt (Silver Laurel Leaf), Germany's highest sporting honour, by President Joachim Gauck in November 2012, named Team of the Year for 2012.

== Achievements ==
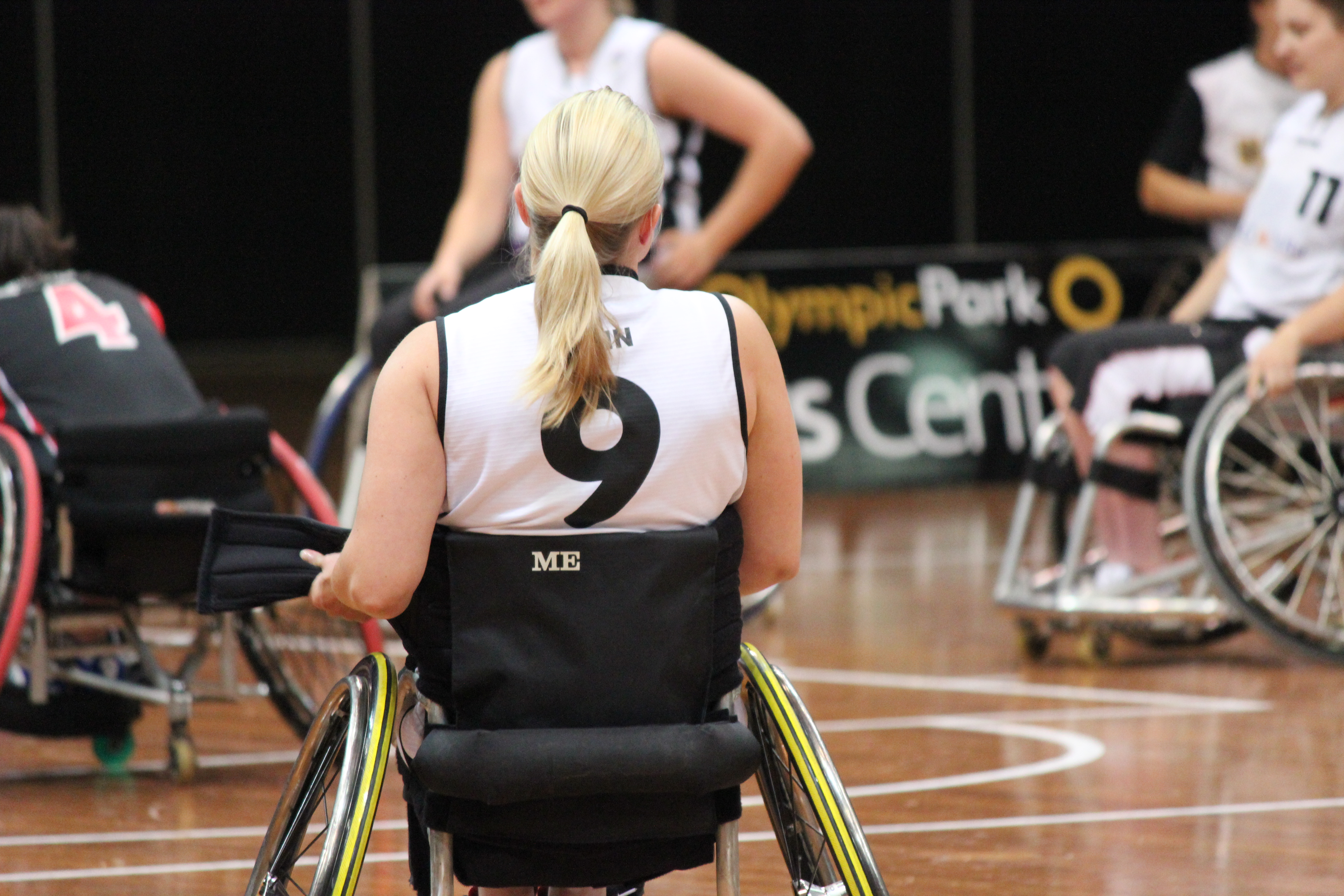
Maria Kühn in Sydney, July 2012

- 2009: Gold at the European Championships (Stoke Mandeville, England)
- 2010: Silver at the Women's World Championships (Birmingham, England)
- 2011: Gold at the European Championships (Nazareth, Israel)
- 2012: Gold at the Paralympic Games (London, England)

== Awards ==
- 2012: Team of the Year
- 2012: Silver Laurel Leaf
