= Annegret Brießmann =

German wheelchair basketball player

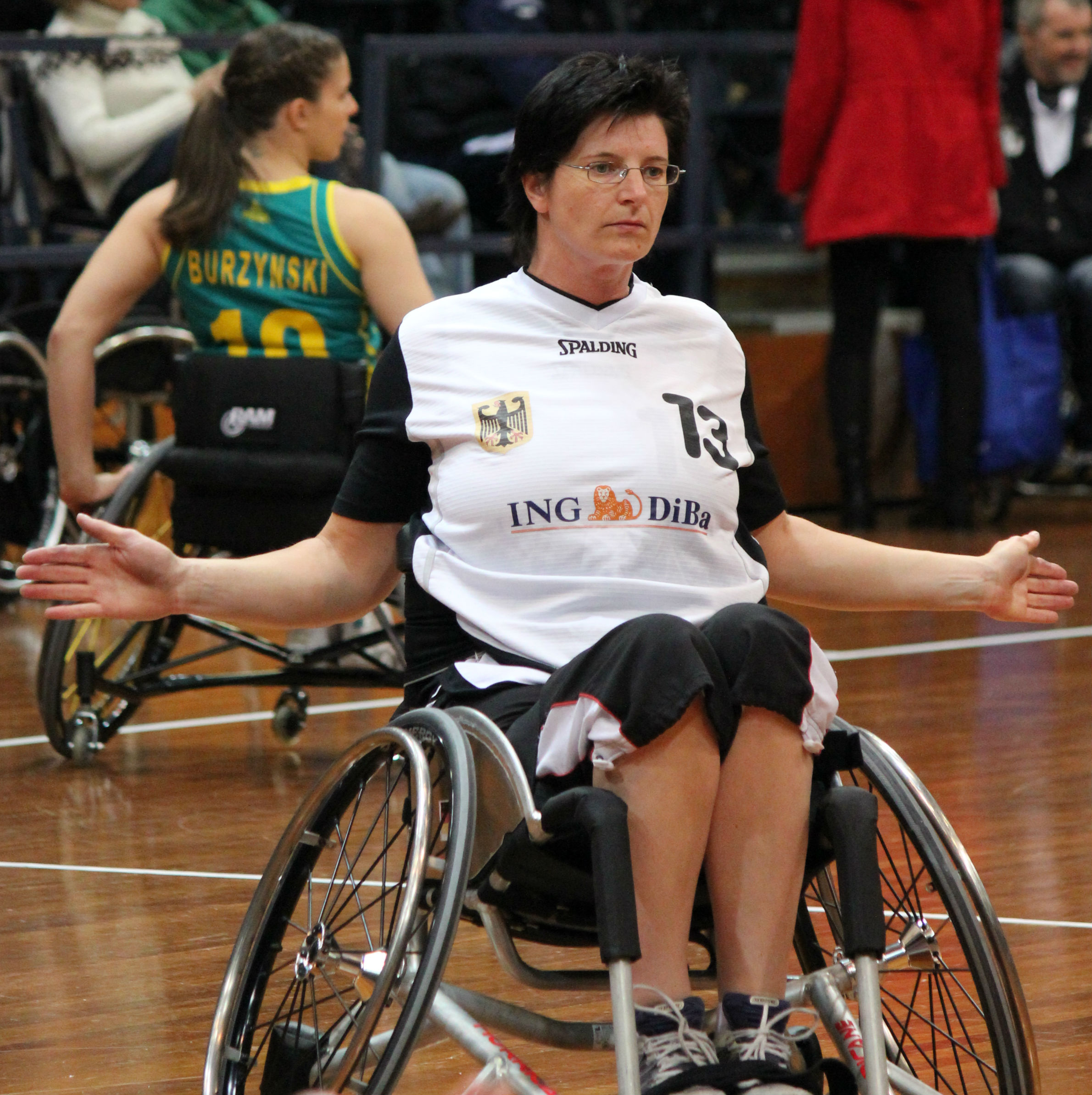
- Annegret Brießmann in Sydney, July 2012

Personal information
- Born: 28 July 1972 (age 54) Ober-Beerbach, Germany
- Height: 184 cm (72 in)

Sport
- Country: Germany
- Sport: Wheelchair basketball
- Disability class: 1.0
- Event: Women's team
- Club: Mainhatten Skywheelers
- Coached by: Holger Glinicki

Achievements and titles
- Paralympic finals: 2012 Paralympics, 2016 Paralympics
Medal record
Wheelchair basketball
Paralympic Games
Gold medal – first place	2012 London	Women's Wheelchair basketball
Silver medal – second place	2016 Rio de Janeiro	Women's Wheelchair basketball
IWBF World Championship
Silver medal – second place	2010 Birmingham, Great Britain	Women's wheelchair basketball
Silver medal – second place	2014 Toronto, Canada	Women's wheelchair basketball

Annegret Brießmann (born 28 July 1972) is a 1.0 point wheelchair basketball player, who plays for the Frankfurt Mainhatten Skywheelers. She has also played with the German national team which won a gold medal at the 2012 Summer Paralympics in London. President Joachim Gauck awarded the team Germany's highest sporting honour, the Silbernes Lorbeerblatt (Silver Laurel Leaf).

== Biography ==
Annegret Brießmann was born in Ober-Beerbach on 28 July 1972. She now lives in Einhausen. As a teenager, she played soccer for SKG Ober-Beerbach Fußball, and participated in track and field events with TSV Eschollbrücken. She also played basketball with the local team, BSC Einhausen, for many years.

A skiing accident in Austria in 2005 resulted in a broken vertebra, rendering Brießmann a paraplegic. She went back to track and field athletics, winning the German national championship in the shot put with a throw of 16.70 metres (54.8 ft). In athletics she had a Disability sport classification of T55. In the International Paralympic Committee (IPC) world rankings her shot put throw of 6.10 metres (20.0 ft) ranked her fifth in the world; her 16.7 metres (55 ft) in discus put her in eighth place; and in the javelin with 12.31 metres (40.4 ft) she was ranked eleventh. Einhausen named her their Sportswoman of the Year in 2009. However, T55 classification events were dropped from the track and field program for the 2012 Summer Paralympics in London.

Brießmann was introduced to the sport of wheelchair basketball while in rehab. She was classified as a 1.0 point player, the highest level of disability. She played in Darmstadt and Aschaffenburg, then joined the Mainhatten Skywheelers in Frankfurt in 2010. Playing for Team Hessen, she won the women's championships in 2009, 2011 and 2012. She began training with the national squad, and in July 2012 national coach Holger Glinicki nominated her for the national team for the London Paralympics.

In the Gold Medal match in London, the team faced the Australia women's national wheelchair basketball team, who had defeated them 48–46 in Sydney just a few months before, in front of a capacity crowd of over 12,000 at the North Greenwich Arena. The German team had been undefeated up to that point, but had started off slow in its games against the United States and China, winning these games by six-point margins, and seemed to play its best basketball only in the final minutes of a game. They defeated the Australians 44–58 in front of a crowd of over 12,000 at the North Greenwich Arena to win the gold medal, the first that Germany had won in women's wheelchair basketball in 28 years. It was the first gold medal that Germany had won in women's wheelchair basketball at the Paralympics since 1984. They were awarded the Silver Laurel Leaf by President Joachim Gauck in November 2012, and were named Team of the Year for 2012.

The German team lost the European Championship to the Netherlands before a home town crowd of 2,300 in Frankfurt in July 2013 by a point, 56–57. It claimed silver at the 2014 Women's World Wheelchair Basketball Championship in Toronto, Ontario, Canada, and beat the Netherlands in the 2015 European Championships, to claim its tenth European title. At the 2016 Paralympic Games, it won silver after losing the final to the United States.

== Achievements ==
- 2012: Gold at the Paralympic Games (London, England)
- 2013: Silver at the European Championships (Frankfurt, Germany)
- 2014: Silver at the World Championships (Toronto, Canada)
- 2015: Gold at the European Championships (Worcester, England)
- 2016: Silver at the Paralympic Games (Rio de Janeiro, Brazil)

== Awards ==
- 2012: Team of the Year
- 2012: Silver Laurel Leaf
