= Britt Dillmann =

German wheelchair basketball player (born 1963)

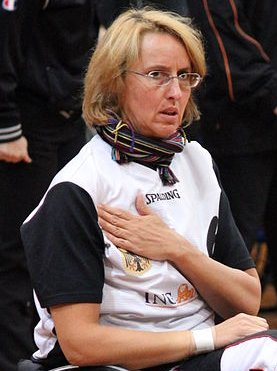
- Dillmann in Sydney, July 2012

Personal information
- Nickname: MA
- Born: 4 April 1963 (age 63)

Sport
- Country: Germany
- Sport: Wheelchair basketball
- Disability class: 1.0
- Event: Women's team
- Team: RSV Lahn-Dill
- Coached by: Holger Glinicki

Achievements and titles
- Paralympic finals: 1988 Summer Paralympics; 2012 Summer Paralympics
Medal record
Women's wheelchair basketball
Representing Germany
Paralympic Games
Gold medal – first place	2012 London	Team competition
Silver medal – second place	1988 Seoul	Team competition

Britt Dillmann (born 4 April 1963) is a 1.0-point wheelchair basketball player, who is a forward for RSV Lahn-Dill in the German wheelchair basketball league. She has also played for the national team, winning a silver medal at the 1988 Summer Paralympics in Seoul. She retired soon afterwards, but staged a comeback in 2011, rejoining the national team, which went on to win the European championships, and then a gold medal at the 2012 Summer Paralympics in London. President Joachim Gauck awarded the team Germany's highest sporting honour, the Silbernes Lorbeerblatt (Silver Laurel Leaf).

== Biography ==
Britt Tuna was born on 4 April 1963. She played wheelchair basketball for RSV Lahn-Dill, and the German national team which won the European Wheelchair Basketball Championship in 1987. At the 1988 Summer Paralympics in Seoul, Tuna was considered to be the strongest wheelchair basketball player in her 1.0-point class. The German team went through the tournament undefeated until the final match, which they lost to the United States, 38–31. Tuna was bitter about the defeat, which she blamed on a tactical error by the German coach. She later conceded, "So habe ihr diese Niederlage noch über Jahre nachgehangen" ("I indulged in this defeat for many years").

In the early 1990s, Tuna quit basketball to focus on her work. She married, changing her surname to Dillmann, and raised three children (Jana Dillmann, Charlotte Dillmann, Valentin Joshua Dillmann). But in the summer of 2009, Dillmann felt that she had become overweight and unfit. A low-carbohydrate diet and daily exercise at the gym, in the pool, and on the handcycle, saw her weight drop by 30 kilograms (66 lb) in a year.

Dillmann then decided to try wheelchair basketball again. She retrieved her old basketball chair, now somewhat mouldy and smelly, from the basement, and sought a game with her old team, RSV Lahn-Dill. Her debut game with the seconds saw the basketball officials reaching for their rulebooks to see if the old chair, of a type they had never seen, was still legal.

Although RSV Lahn-Dill, eager to develop young players, would only let her play in the seconds, Dillmann caught the attention of national coach Holger Glinicki, who was looking for a top-notch 1.0-point player. In 2010, she rejoined the national team that she had played on before many of her new teammates were born. The team went on to win the European Championships in 2011. Dillmann's treatment contrasted with that of national teammate Gesche Schünemann. While Schünemann received endorsements and could train in the hall of RSV Lahn-Dill's Rivers Barracks, Dillmann got none, and trained outdoors.

In June 2012 she was named as one of the team that competed at the 2012 Summer Paralympic Games in London. At the age of 49, she was the oldest wheelchair basketball player there. In the Gold Medal match, the team faced the Australia women's national wheelchair basketball team, a team that had beaten them 48–46 in Sydney just a few months before. They defeated the Australians 44–58 in front of a crowd of over 12,000 at the North Greenwich Arena to win the gold medal, the first that Germany had won in women's wheelchair basketball in 28 years. They were awarded a Silver Laurel Leaf by president Joachim Gauck in November 2012, and were again named Team of the Year for 2012. For Dillmann, the gold medal victory removed the pain of the loss 24 years before. "Das hat mich versöhnt mit Seoul" ("This has reconciled me with Seoul") she said.

== Achievements ==
- 1987: Gold at the European Championships (Lorient, France)
- 1988: Silver at Paralympic Games (Seoul, South Korea)
- 2011: Gold at the European Championships (Nazareth, Israel)
- 2012: Gold at the Paralympic Games (London, England)

== Awards ==
- 2012: Team of the Year
- 2012: Silver Laurel Leaf
Sydney July 2012
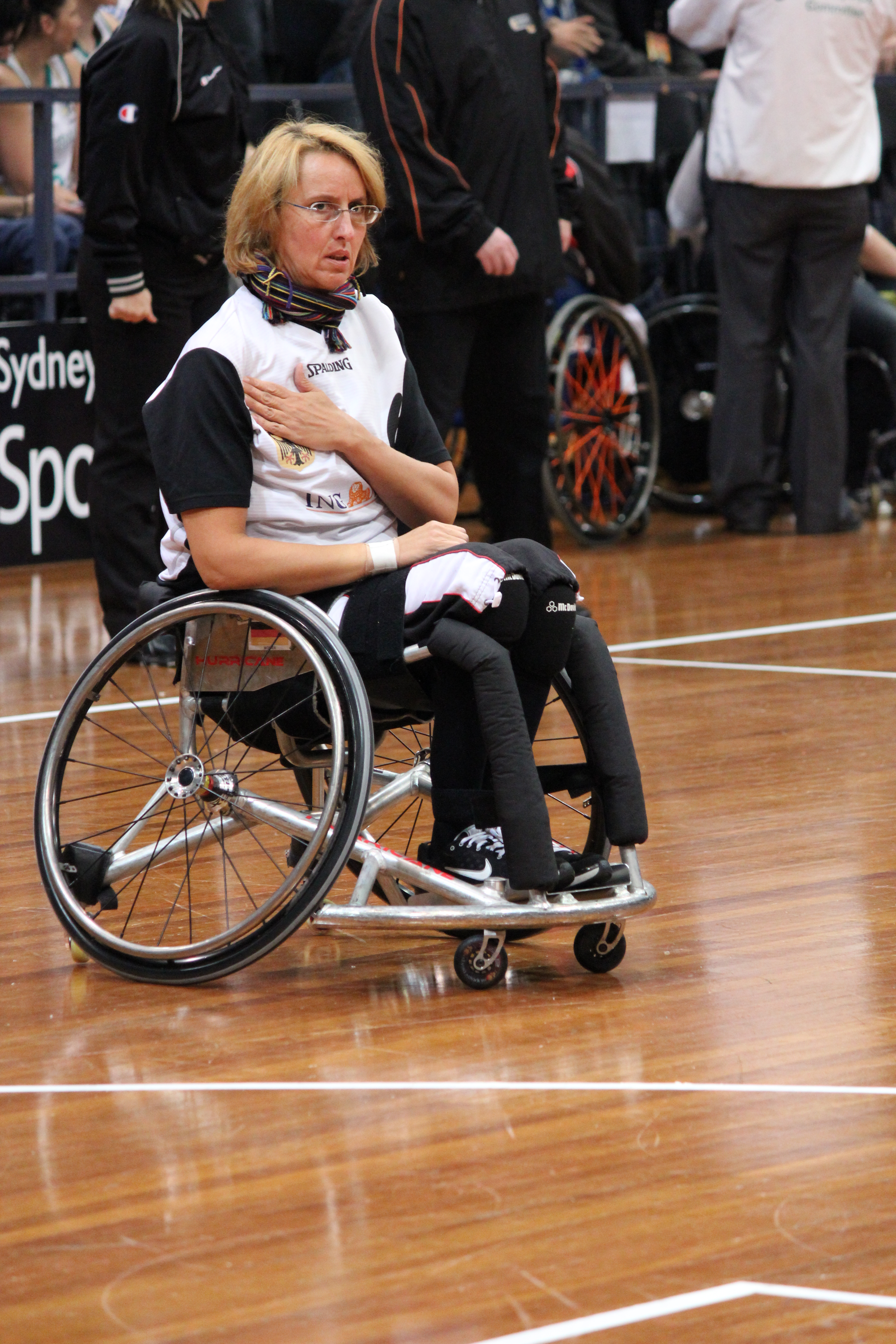

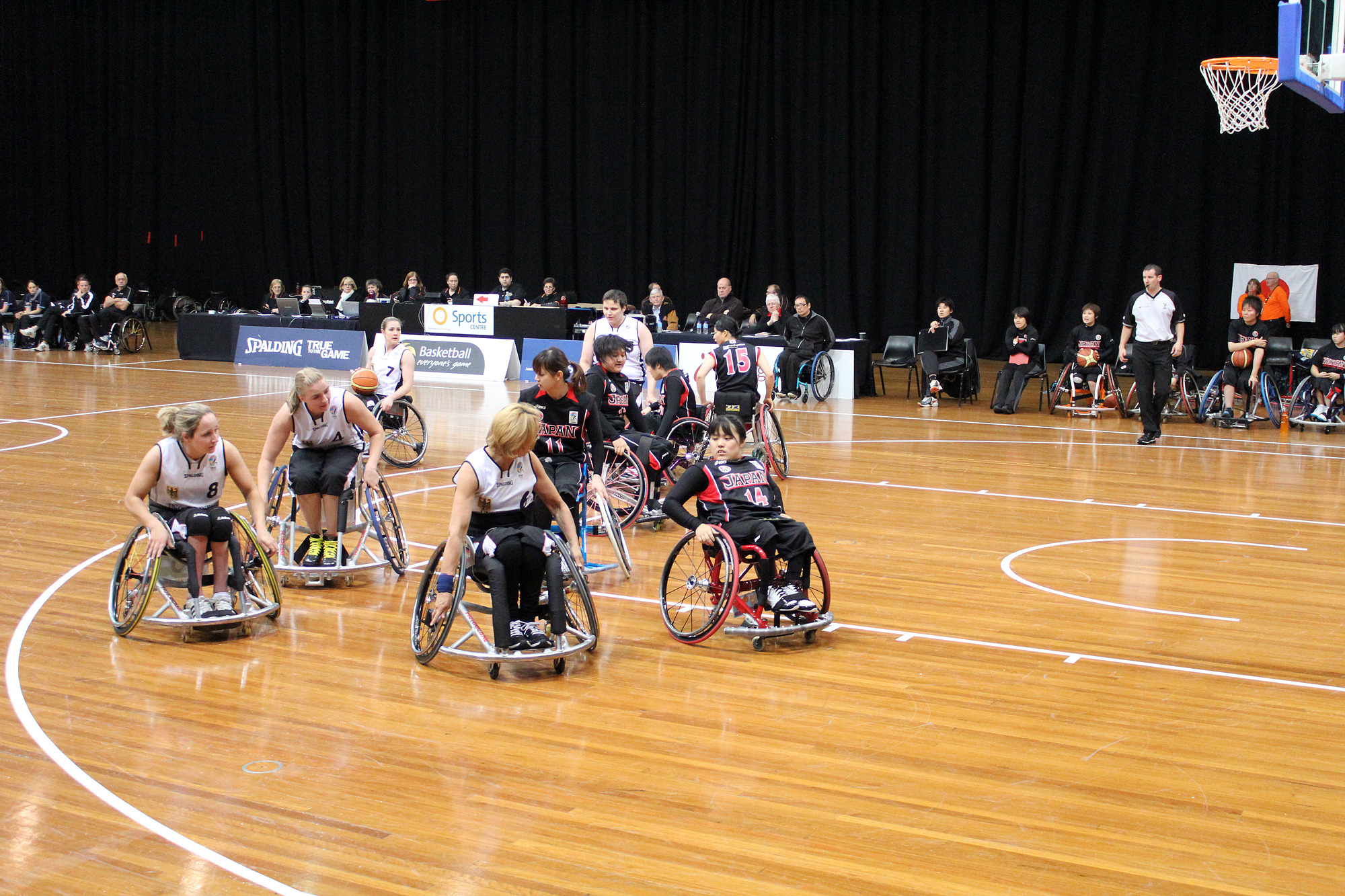

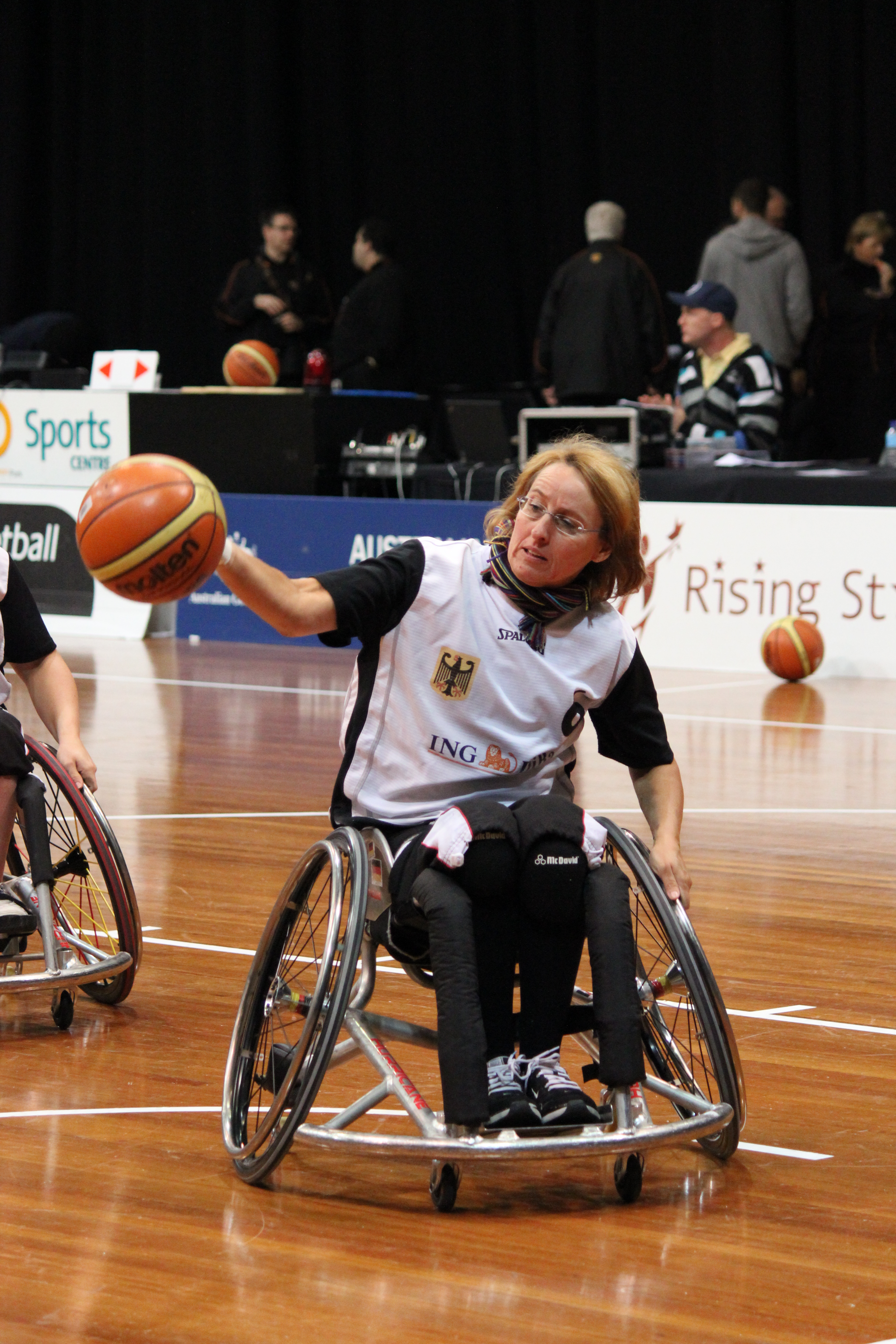
