= Holger Glinicki =

German wheelchair basketball coach (born 1952)

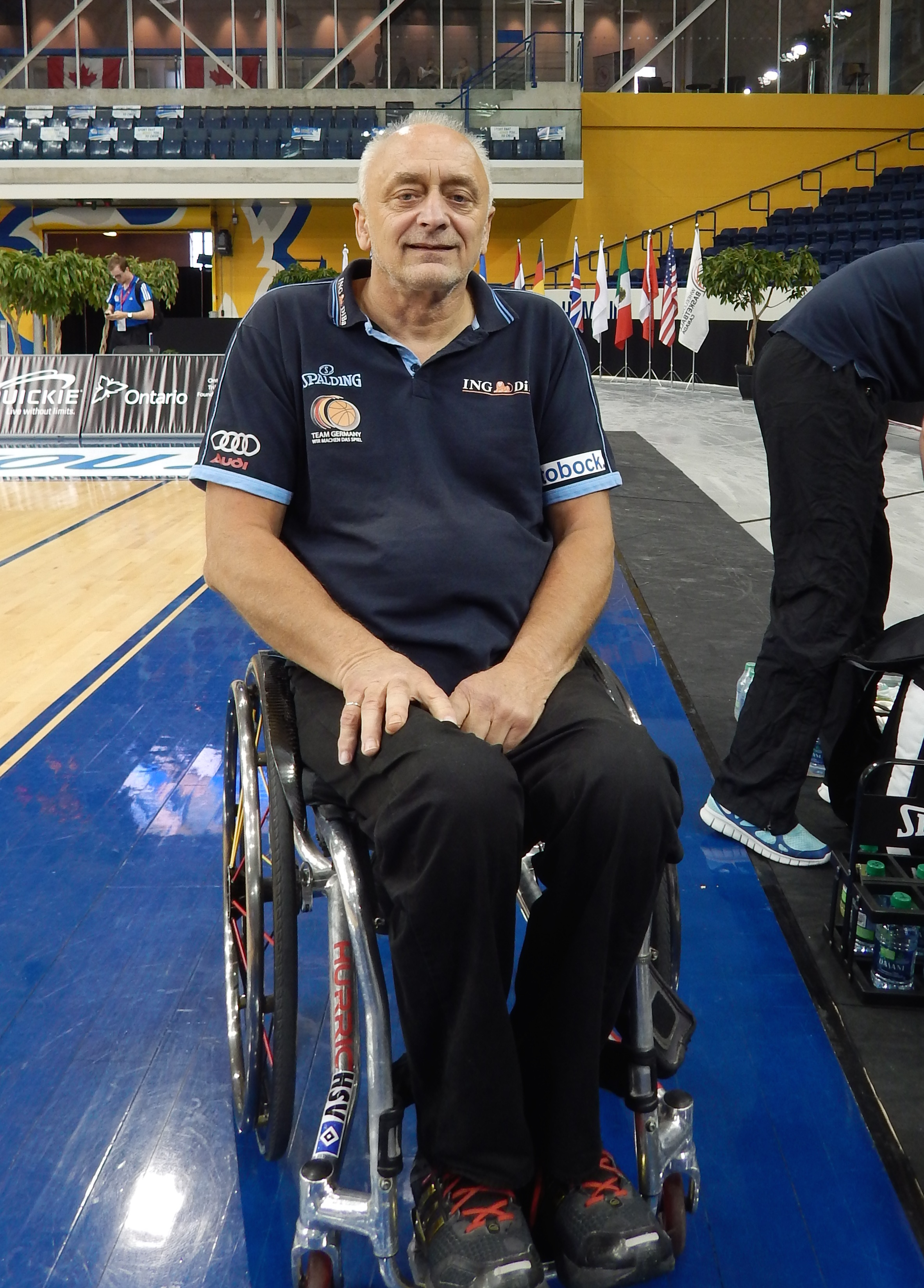
- Holger Glinicki at the 2014 Women's World Wheelchair Basketball Championship in Toronto, June 2014

Personal information
- Nationality: Germany
- Born: 25 October 1952 (age 73)

Sport
- Country: Germany
- Sport: Wheelchair basketball
- Event: Women's team
- Club: Hamburger SV; BG Baskets Hamburg
- Team: Germany national women's wheelchair basketball team

Achievements and titles
- Paralympic finals: 2008 Summer Paralympics; 2012 Summer Paralympics; 2016 Summer Paralympics
Medal record
Wheelchair basketball
Paralympic Games
Gold medal – first place	2012 London	Women's Wheelchair basketball
Silver medal – second place	2008 Beijing	Women's Wheelchair basketball
Silver medal – second place	2016 Rio de Janeiro	Women's Wheelchair basketball
World Championship
Silver medal – second place	2010 Birmingham	Women's Wheelchair basketball
Silver medal – second place	2014 Toronto, Canada	Women's wheelchair basketball
Bronze medal – third place	2006 Amsterdam	Women's Wheelchair basketball

Holger Glinicki (born 25 October 1952) is a German wheelchair basketball coach, who coached Hamburger SV. He was assistant coach of the German women's national team from 2003 to 2005. He has been coach of the team since 2006, during which time it has won five European championships, a silver medal at the 2008 Summer Paralympics in Beijing and a gold medal at the 2012 Summer Paralympics in London.

== Biography ==
Holger Glinicki was born in Hamburg on 25 October 1952. He was paralysed following a motorcycle accident in 1972 that broke his fourth thoracic vertebra. He became involved in disability sports, playing wheelchair basketball for RSC Hamburg, who were the German national champions in 1983, and played a total of 123 international games. He became assistant coach of the German women's national wheelchair basketball team in 2003, and then coach in 2006. The team won five consecutive European championships, in 2003, 2005, 2007, 2009 and 2011, and a silver medal at the 2008 Summer Paralympics in Beijing.

The German team started off slow in its games against the United States and China at the 2012 Summer Paralympics, winning these games by slim six-point margins. Marina Mohnen thought that they played their best basketball only in the final minutes of a game. They defeated the Australia women's national wheelchair basketball team at the 2012 Summer Paralympics by 44–58 in front of a crowd of over 12,000 at the North Greenwich Arena to win the gold medal. It was the first gold medal that Germany had won in women's wheelchair basketball at the Paralympics since 1984. They were awarded the Silver Laurel Leaf by President Joachim Gauck in November 2012, and were named Team of the Year for 2012. Glinicki celebrated by plunging off Canary Wharf into London's River Thames. He was named Hamburg's coach of the year for 2012.

Glinicki was philosophical about the win, noting in December 2012 that there were many awards and ceremonies, but that the memory of London was fading over time. He returned to coaching his club team, Hamburger SV (now renamed BG Baskets Hamburg), which included national team members Mareike Adermann and Edina Müller (and Australia's Bridie Kean). It went on to win the national championship for the eighth time in 2013. The national team was not so fortunate, losing the European Championship to the Netherlands by a point, 56–57, before a home town crowd in Frankfurt in July 2013.

In April 2014, Glinicki coached BG Baskets Hamburg to a win in the final of the International Wheelchair Basketball Federation Euro League Challenge Cup, its first International title, with a 62–54 over the Frankfurt Mainhatten Skywheelers. The team also won the Fair Play Award of the International Wheelchair Basketball Federation Europe.

== Achievements ==
- 2003: Gold European Championships (Hamburg, Germany)
- 2005: Gold European Championships (Villeneuve d'Ascq, France)
- 2007: Gold European Championships (Wetzlar, Germany)
- 2008: Silver Paralympic Games (Beijing, China)
- 2009: Gold European Championships (Stoke Mandeville, Great Britain)
- 2010: Silver World Championships (Birmingham, Great Britain)
- 2011: Gold European Championships (Nazareth, Israel)
- 2012: Gold Paralympic Games (London, Great Britain)
- 2012: Hamburg coach of the year for 2012.
- 2013: Silver European Championships (Frankfurt, Germany)
- 2014: Silver at the World Championships (Toronto, Canada)
- 2015: Gold at the European Championships (Worcester, England)
- 2016: Silver at the Paralympic Games (Rio de Janeiro, Brazil)
