= Tobias Graf =

German Paralympic cyclist

Tobias Graf (born 17 March 1984 in Loßburg) is a Paralympic track cyclist for Germany. He has won medals at the 2004, 2008, and 2012 Summer Paralympics.
