= Dorothee Vieth =

German Paralympic cyclist

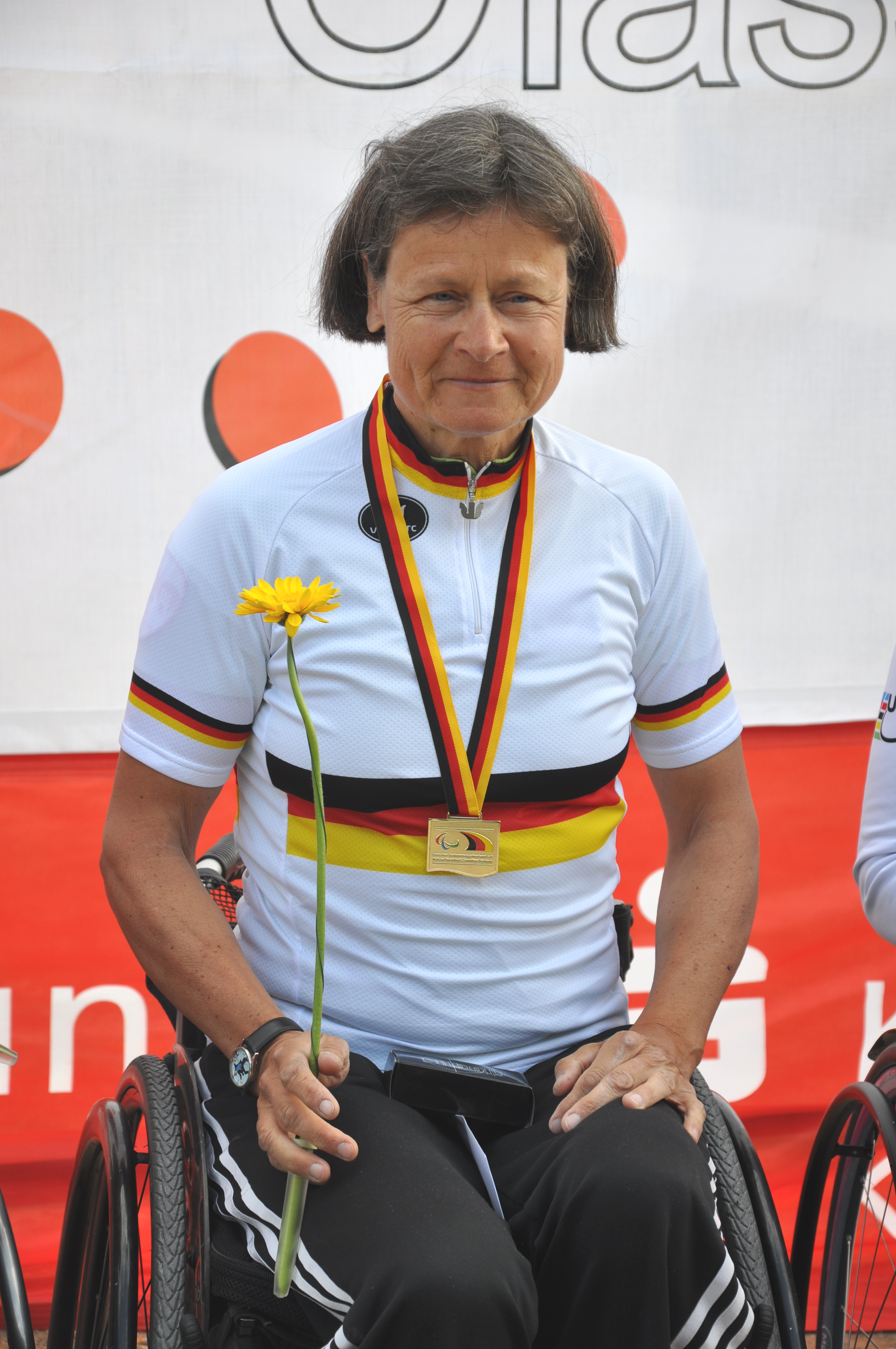
- Dorothee Vieth in 2016.

Personal information
- Nationality: German
- Born: 12 October 1960 (age 65) Hamburg, West Germany

Sport
- Country: Germany
- Sport: Cycling
Medal record
Paralympic Games
Gold medal – first place	2016 Rio de Janeiro	Time trial
Silver medal – second place	2012 London	Time trial
Bronze medal – third place	2008 Beijing	Time trial
Bronze medal – third place	2008 Beijing	Road race
Bronze medal – third place	2012 London	Road race

Dorothee Vieth (born 12 October 1960) is a German Paralympic cyclist.

Vieth first participated in the Summer Paralympics in 2008 where she won two bronze medals in the time trial and road race events. At the 2012 games she won a silver medal in the time trial event and a bronze in the road race event and won a gold medal in the time trial event at the 2016 games.

She has a paralysis of the leg and gluteus muscles. She is also a violinist and violin teacher.
