= Singapore at the Paralympics =

- IPC code: SGP
- NPC: Singapore National Paralympic Council
- Website: https://www.snpc.org.sg/
- Medals Ranked 69th: Gold 7 Silver 3 Bronze 4 Total 14

Summer appearances
- 1988; 1992; 1996; 2000; 2004; 2008; 2012; 2016; 2020; 2024

Singapore began their participation in the Paralympic Games when a squad was sent to the 1988 Summer Paralympics held in Seoul, South Korea. Despite winning no medals in the 1988 Summer Games, Singapore continued to send teams to the Summer Paralympics. At the 2008 Summer Paralympics, Singapore sent six athletes and came home with four medals. The 2008 Games was the first time Singapore has won a medal in any Paralympic competition.

== Medal tables ==
=== Medals by Summer Games ===
Games	Gold	Silver	Bronze	Total	Rank
(Italy) Rome 1960	did not participate				
(Japan) Tokyo 1964	did not participate				
(Israel) Tel Aviv 1968	did not participate				
(West Germany) Heidelberg 1972	did not participate				
(Canada) Toronto 1976	did not participate				
(Netherlands) Arnhem 1980	did not participate				
(United States) New York 1984/ (United Kingdom) Stoke Mandeville 1984	did not participate				
(South Korea) Seoul 1988	0	0	0	0	-
(Spain) Barcelona 1992	0	0	0	0	-
(United States) Atlanta 1996	0	0	0	0	–
(Australia) Sydney 2000	0	0	0	0	–
(Greece) Athens 2004	0	0	0	0	–
(China) Beijing 2008	1	1	2	4	46
(United Kingdom) London 2012	0	1	1	2	65
(Brazil) Rio de Janeiro 2016	2	0	1	3	46
(Japan) Tokyo 2020	2	0	0	2	48
(France) Paris 2024	2	1	0	3	44
(United States) Los Angeles 2028	Future event				
(Australia) Brisbane 2032	Future event				
Total	7	3	4	14	66

=== Medals by Summer Sports ===
Sport	Gold	Silver	Bronze	Total
Swimming	7	1	1	9
Equestrian	0	1	3	4
Boccia	0	1	0	1
Totals (3 entries)	7	3	4	14

== List of medalists ==
Medal	Name	Games	Sport	Event	Date
Gold	Yip Pin Xiu	(China) 2008 Beijing	Swimming	Women's 50 metre backstroke S3	15 September
Silver	Yip Pin Xiu	(China) 2008 Beijing	Swimming	Women's 50 metre freestyle S3	13 September
Bronze	Laurentia Tan	(China) 2008 Beijing	Equestrian	Individual championship test grade Ia	9 September
Bronze	Laurentia Tan	(China) 2008 Beijing	Equestrian	Individual freestyle test grade Ia	11 September
Silver	Laurentia Tan	(United Kingdom) 2012 London	Equestrian	Individual freestyle test grade Ia	4 September
Bronze	Laurentia Tan	(United Kingdom) 2012 London	Equestrian	Individual championship test grade Ia	2 September
Gold	Yip Pin Xiu	(Brazil) 2016 Rio de Janeiro	Swimming	Women's 100 metre backstroke S2	9 September
Gold	Yip Pin Xiu	(Brazil) 2016 Rio de Janeiro	Swimming	Women's 50 metre backstroke S2	16 September
Bronze	Theresa Goh	(Brazil) 2016 Rio de Janeiro	Swimming	Women's 100 metre breaststroke SB4	12 September
Gold	Yip Pin Xiu	(Japan) 2020 Tokyo	Swimming	Women’s 100 metre backstroke S2	25 August
Gold	Yip Pin Xiu	(Japan) 2020 Tokyo	Swimming	Women’s 50 metre backstroke S2	2 September
Gold	Yip Pin Xiu	(France) 2024 Paris	Swimming	Women’s 100 metre backstroke S2	30 August
Gold	Yip Pin Xiu	(France) 2024 Paris	Swimming	Women’s 50 metre backstroke S2	31 August
Silver	Jeralyn Tan	(France) 2024 Paris	Boccia	Women’s individual BC1	2 September
