= Simon Laurens =

British Para-equestrian (born 1967)

Personal information
- Discipline: Para-dressage
- Born: 28 November 1967 (age 57); Saint Brélade, Jersey
Medal record
Representing Great Britain
Para-equestrian
Event / 1st / 2nd / 3rd; Paralympic Games / 1 / 1 / 0
Paralympic Games
Gold medal – first place	2008 Beijing	Team open
Silver medal – second place	2008 Beijing	Freestyle test grade III

Simon Laurens (born 28 November 1967 in Saint Brélade, Jersey) is a British Para-equestrian who competed at the 2008 Summer Paralympics, held in Beijing, China.

== Sports career ==
He started riding at the age of eight and competed in gymkhana and show jumping with his palomino Champagne, before taking up dressage whilst working with Gemma Green for nine years at her yard in Jersey. Laurens was diagnosed with multiple sclerosis in 2004. Within two years he began competing for the Great Britain para dressage team. He won the National Grade III Disabled Dressage title in 2006 and 2007 and also won both team and individual freestyle golds at the 2007 World Para Championships.

Selected to compete at his first Paralympic Games in 2008, Laurens entered the individual freestyle test grade III and was part of the Great Britain quartet for the overall team championship. Competing on his horse Ocean Diamond he won the silver medal in the individual event behind Hannelore Brenner of Germany. In the team open Laurens, with teammates Lee Pearson, Anne Dunham and Sophie Christiansen won the gold medal. This meant that Great Britain has won a gold medal in that event at four consecutive Games. Following his success in Beijing he was named the BBC South West Disabled Sports Personality of the year for 2008.

In 2009 Laurens won three medals at the European Championships held in Kristiansand, Norway, and was one six people whose efforts were recognised with the award of a medal of honour for "activities connected with international endeavour in relation to equestrian sport". Later that year he was named Disability Sports Personality of the Year at the Gloucestershire Media Sports Awards.

He announced his retirement from international para-equestrian dressage in January 2011, citing "personal and financial reasons" for his decision.
