= Singapore at the 2020 Summer Paralympics =

- IPC code: SGP
- NPC: Singapore National Paralympic Council

in Tokyo
- Competitors: 10 in 6 sports
- Medals: Gold 2 Silver 0 Bronze 0 Total 2

Summer Paralympics appearances (overview)
- 1988; 1992; 1996; 2000; 2004; 2008; 2012; 2016; 2020; 2024

Singapore competed at the 2020 Summer Paralympics in Tokyo, Japan, from 24 August to 5 September 2021. A total of 10 athletes competed in the games.

== Medalist ==
Medal	Name	Sport	Event	Date
Gold	Yip Pin Xiu	Swimming	Women's 100 metre backstroke S2	25 August
Gold	Yip Pin Xiu	Swimming	Women's 50 metre backstroke S2	2 September

== Competitors ==
#	Sport	Men	Women	Total	Events
1	Archery	0	1	1	1
2	Athletics	1	0	1	1
3	Cycling	1	0	1	3
4	Equestrian	1	2	3	5
5	Powerlifting	0	1	1	1
6	Swimming	1	2	3	7
Total		4	6	10	18

== Archery ==
Singapore has entered one archer at Women's Individual Compound Open.

Women

Athlete	Event	Ranking round		Round of 32	Round of 16	Quarterfinals	Semifinals	Finals	
Athlete	Event	Score	Seed	Opposition score	Opposition score	Opposition score	Opposition score	Opposition score	Rank
Nur Syahidah Alim	Women's individual compound	682	7						

== Athletics ==
Singapore sent one male shot-putter in the games.

Men's field

Athlete	Event	Final	
Athlete	Event	Result	Rank
Muhammad Diroy Noordin	Shot put F40	9.92 m	8

== Cycling ==
Singapore sent one male cyclist after successfully getting a slot in the 2018 UCI Nations Ranking Allocation quota for the Asian.

=== Road ===
Men's road event

Athlete	Event	Time	Rank
Tee Wee Leong piloted by Ang Kee Meng	Men's time trial B	DNF	

=== Track ===
Men's track event

Athlete	Event	Qualification		Final	
Athlete	Event	Time	Rank	Opposition Time	Rank
Tee Wee Leong piloted by Ang Kee Meng	Men's individual pursuit B	4:40.453	9	Did not advance	
Tee Wee Leong piloted by Ang Kee Meng	Men's time trial B	N/A		1:10.886	8

== Equestrian ==
Singapore sent one athlete after being qualified. Another two athletes have qualified as well.

Athlete	Horse	Event	Total	
Athlete	Horse	Event	Score	Rank
Gemma Rose Foo	Gambler	Mixed individual championship test grade I	62.750%	17
Laurentia Tan	Banestro	Mixed individual championship test grade I	73.964%	5
Maximillian Tan	Don's Day Dream	Mixed individual championship test grade II	61.588%	11

Athlete	Horse	Event	Individual Score			Total	
Athlete	Horse	Event	TT	CT	Total	Score	Rank
Gemma Rose Foo	See above	Team open					
Laurentia Tan	See above	Team open					
Maximillian Tan	See above	Team open					

== Powerlifting ==
Singapore sent its first powerlifting representative in the game, the first time Singapore participated.

Athlete	Events	Final	
Athlete	Events	Result	Rank
Nur'Aini Mohamad Yasli	Women's -45kg	77 kg	6

== Swimming ==
Three Singaporean swimmers have successfully secured a Paralympics berth after breaking the MQS.

Men

Athlete	Event	Heats		Final	
Athlete	Event	Time	Rank	Time	Rank
Toh Wei Soong	50 metre freestyle S7	29.01	5 Q	28.65	7
Toh Wei Soong	400 metre freestyle S7	5:03.82	3 Q	5:06.39	7
Toh Wei Soong	50 metre butterfly S7	29.90	5 Q	29.50	4

Women

Athlete	Event	Heats		Final	
Athlete	Event	Time	Rank	Time	Rank
Sophie Soon	100 metre breaststroke SB12	Bye		1:29.52	4
Sophie Soon	100 metre butterfly S13	1:28.61	18	Did not advance	
Yip Pin Xiu	Women's 50 metre backstroke S2	1:03.61	1 Q	1:02.04	1st place, gold medalist(s)
Yip Pin Xiu	Women's 100 metre backstroke S2	2:14.46	1 Q	2:16.61	1st place, gold medalist(s)

== See also ==
Singapore at the 2020 Summer Olympics
