= Singapore at the 2012 Summer Paralympics =

- IPC code: SIN
- NPC: Singapore National Paralympic Council

in London
- Competitors: 8 in 4 sports
- Medals Ranked 65th: Gold 0 Silver 1 Bronze 1 Total 2

Summer Paralympics appearances (overview)
- 1988; 1992; 1996; 2000; 2004; 2008; 2012; 2016; 2020; 2024

Singapore sent a delegation to compete at the 2012 Summer Paralympics in London, from August 29 to September 9. Eight athletes are entered in the competitions from Singapore.

== Medallists ==
Medal	Name	Sport	Event	Date
Silver	Laurentia Tan	Equestrian	Individual Freestyle Ia	4 September
Bronze	Laurentia Tan	Equestrian	Individual Championship Ia	2 September

== Boccia ==
Athlete	Event	Seeding Match	Round of 32	Round of 16	Quarterfinals	Semifinals	Final	
Athlete	Event	Opposition Result	Opposition Result	Opposition Result	Opposition Result	Opposition Result	Opposition Result	Rank
Nurul Binte	Individual BC3	Cronin (IRL); L 4–6	Martino (CAN); W 5–2	Cronin (IRL); W 7–1	Kim (KOR); L 3–3	did not advance		

== Equestrian ==
Athlete	Horse	Event	Total	
Athlete	Horse	Event	Score	Rank
Gemma Foo	Avalon	Individual Championship Ia	65.050	13
Gemma Foo	Avalon	Individual Freestyle Ia	65.800	12
Laurentia Tan	Ruben James 2	Individual Championship Ia	73.650	3rd place, bronze medalist(s)
Laurentia Tan	Ruben James 2	Individual Freestyle Ia	79.000	2nd place, silver medalist(s)
Maximillian Tan	Avalon	Individual Championship Ib	59.304	15
Maximillian Tan	Avalon	Individual Freestyle Ib	62.000	14

Athlete	Horse	Event	Individual Score			Total	
Athlete	Horse	Event	TT	CT	Total	Score	Rank
Gemma Foo	See above	Team	68.588	65.050	133.638	404.191	11
Laurentia Tan	See above	Team	74.235	73.650	147.885	404.191	11
Maximillian Tan	See above	Team	63.364	59.304	122.668	404.191	11

== Sailing ==
Athlete	Event	Race											Net points	Rank
Athlete	Event	1	2	3	4	5	6	7	8	9	10	11*	Net points	Rank
Desiree Lim; Jovin Tan	SKUD 18 - 2 person keelboat	8	6	8	(10)	5	7	7	6	8	9	—N/a	64	7

* Due to a lack of wind Race 11 was cancelled

== Swimming ==
Women

Athletes	Event	Heat		Final	
Athletes	Event	Time	Rank	Time	Rank
Yip Pin Xiu	50m freestyle S3	—N/a		1:01.64	4
Yip Pin Xiu	100m freestyle S3	2:09.74	4 Q	2:09.41	4
Theresa Goh	50m freestyle S5	47.91	10	did not advance	
Theresa Goh	100m freestyle S5	1:45.78	11	did not advance	

== See also ==
- Singapore at the 2012 Summer Olympics
