= Equestrian at the 2008 Summer Paralympics – Individual freestyle test grade Ia =

Individual Freestyle Test Grade Ia at the XIII Paralympic Games
- Paralympic Equestrian
- Venue: Hong Kong Olympic Equestrian Centre
- Dates: 11 September 2008
- Competitors: 13 from 10 nations

Medalists
1st place, gold medalist(s)		Sophie Christiansen	Great Britain
2nd place, silver medalist(s)		Anne Dunham	Great Britain
3rd place, bronze medalist(s)		Laurentia Tan	Singapore

The Equestrian Individual Freestyle Test Grade Ia event at the 2008 Summer Paralympics was held in the Hong Kong Olympic Equestrian Centre on 11 September.

The competition was assessed by a ground jury composed of five judges placed at locations designated E, H, C, M, and B. Each judge rated the competitors' performances with scores out of 10 for technical difficulty and artistic merit. The ten scores from the jury were then summed to determine a rider's total percentage score.

The event was won by Sophie Christiansen, representing Great Britain.

== Ground jury ==
Judge at E	Tarja Huttunen ( Finland)
Judge at H	Hanneke Gerritsen ( Netherlands)
Judge at C	Anne Prain ( France), jury president
Judge at M	Kjell Myhre ( Norway)
Judge at B	Alison Mastin ( Ireland)

== Results ==
Rank	Rider	Horse		Score (and rank)					Tech/Art Score (Rk)	Total % score
Rank	Rider	Horse		E	H	C	M	B	Tech/Art Score (Rk)	Total % score
1st place, gold medalist(s)	Sophie Christiansen (GBR)	Lambrusco III	Tech:	7.667 (1)	7.222 (2)	7.556 (1)	7.111 (2)	7.333 (1)	36.889 (1)	76.166
1st place, gold medalist(s)	Sophie Christiansen (GBR)	Lambrusco III	Art:	8.333 (1)	7.611 (2)	8.111 (1)	7.944 (1)	7.278 (1)	39.277 (1)	76.166
2nd place, silver medalist(s)	Anne Dunham (GBR)	Teddy	Tech:	6.667 (3)	7.333 (1)	7.444 (2)	7.222 (1)	7.222 (2)	35.888 (2)	73.333
2nd place, silver medalist(s)	Anne Dunham (GBR)	Teddy	Art:	7.000 (5)	7.667 (1)	8.056 (2)	7.722 (2)	7.000 (4)	37.445 (2)	73.333
3rd place, bronze medalist(s)	Laurentia Tan (SIN)	Nothing To Lose	Tech:	6.444 (5)	6.889 (3)	6.667 (4)	6.889 (3)	7.000 (3)	33.889 (3)	70.167
3rd place, bronze medalist(s)	Laurentia Tan (SIN)	Nothing To Lose	Art:	7.556 (2)	7.000 (3)	7.333 (4)	7.167 (3)	7.222 (2)	36.278 (3)	70.167
4	Andrea Vigon (ITA)	Priool	Tech:	6.444 (5)	6.556 (5)	7.222 (3)	6.667 (4)	7.000 (3)	33.889 (3)	69.667
4	Andrea Vigon (ITA)	Priool	Art:	7.056 (4)	6.833 (4)	7.944 (3)	6.889 (4)	7.056 (3)	35.778 (4)	69.667
5	Slaven Hudina (CRO)	Tulasi	Tech:	6.778 (2)	6.222 (8)	6.222 (7)	6.556 (5)	6.667 (5)	32.445 (5)	66.889
5	Slaven Hudina (CRO)	Tulasi	Art:	7.167 (3)	6.833 (4)	6.944 (6)	6.722 (6)	6.778 (5)	34.444 (5)	66.889
6	Ivan Srsic (CRO)	Kraljica Kunti	Tech:	6.333 (7)	6.333 (6)	6.667 (4)	6.444 (7)	6.444 (7)	32.221 (7)	65.998
6	Ivan Srsic (CRO)	Kraljica Kunti	Art:	6.500 (6)	6.722 (7)	7.222 (5)	6.722 (6)	6.611 (7)	33.777 (6)	65.998
7	Jan Pike (AUS)	Griffin	Tech:	6.556 (4)	6.333 (6)	6.444 (6)	6.333 (8)	6.667 (5)	32.333 (6)	65.555
7	Jan Pike (AUS)	Griffin	Art:	6.278 (7)	6.778 (6)	6.944 (6)	6.444 (10)	6.778 (5)	33.222 (7)	65.555
8	Sergio Oliva (BRA)	Neho De La Jonchere	Tech:	6.333 (7)	6.222 (8)	5.889 (9)	6.556 (5)	5.556 (11)	30.556 (8)	63.556
8	Sergio Oliva (BRA)	Neho De La Jonchere	Art:	6.278 (7)	6.667 (9)	6.944 (6)	6.833 (5)	6.278 (9)	33.000 (8)	63.556
9	Mauro Caredda (ITA)	Garfielt	Tech:	5.667 (11)	6.111 (10)	6.222 (7)	6.222 (9)	6.222 (8)	30.444 (9)	62.944
9	Mauro Caredda (ITA)	Garfielt	Art:	6.167 (9)	6.444 (10)	6.833 (9)	6.667 (8)	6.389 (8)	32.500 (9)	62.944
10	Mariya Zagorskaya (RUS)	Bazalt	Tech:	5.778 (10)	5.778 (11)	5.889 (9)	6.222 (9)	6.222 (8)	29.889 (10)	60.833
10	Mariya Zagorskaya (RUS)	Bazalt	Art:	5.667 (11)	6.111 (12)	6.444 (10)	6.500 (9)	6.222 (10)	30.944 (10)	60.833
11	Sandy Mitchell (BER)	Highland Fling	Tech:	5.889 (9)	5.778 (11)	5.444 (11)	5.556 (11)	6.000 (10)	28.667 (11)	59.500
11	Sandy Mitchell (BER)	Highland Fling	Art:	5.889 (10)	6.444 (10)	6.278 (11)	6.111 (11)	6.111 (11)	30.833 (11)	59.500
12	Katarina Jobbagyova (SVK)	Impex Libbeno	Tech:	5.333 (12)	6.667 (4)	5.333 (12)	5.444 (12)	5.333 (12)	28.110 (12)	58.666
12	Katarina Jobbagyova (SVK)	Impex Libbeno	Art:	5.667 (11)	6.722 (7)	6.278 (11)	6.000 (12)	5.889 (13)	30.556 (12)	58.666
13	Mark Frenzel (RSA)	Waldfee 697	Tech:	4.889 (13)	4.778 (13)	4.333 (13)	4.000 (13)	5.111 (13)	23.111 (13)	49.166
13	Mark Frenzel (RSA)	Waldfee 697	Art:	5.222 (13)	4.889 (13)	5.167 (13)	4.833 (13)	5.944 (12)	26.055 (13)	49.166
