= Singapore at the 2024 Summer Paralympics =

- IPC code: SGP
- NPC: Singapore National Paralympic Council

in Paris, France August 28, 2024 – September 8, 2024
- Competitors: 10 in 5 sports
- Flag bearer: Toh Wei Soong
- Medals Ranked 44th: Gold 2 Silver 1 Bronze 0 Total 3

Summer Paralympics appearances (overview)
- 1988; 1992; 1996; 2000; 2004; 2008; 2012; 2016; 2020; 2024

Singapore competed at the 2024 Summer Paralympics in Paris, France, from 28 August to 8 September 2024.

== Medalists ==
Medal	Name	Sport	Event	Date	References
Gold	Yip Pin Xiu	Swimming	Women's 100 metre backstroke S2	29 August	
Gold	Yip Pin Xiu	Swimming	Women's 50 metre backstroke S2	1 September	
Silver	Jeralyn Tan	Boccia	Women's individual BC1	2 September	

== Competitors ==
The following is the list of number of competitors in the Games.

Sport	Men	Women	Total
Archery	0	1	1
Athletics	1	0	1
Boccia	0	1	1
Equestrian	0	3	3
Shooting	1	0	1
Swimming	1	2	3
Total	3	7	10

== Archery ==
Singapore entered one athlete into the games by virtue of her result at the 2023 World Para Archery Championships in Plzeň, Czech Republic.

Athlete	Event	Ranking Round		Round of 32	Round of 16	Quarterfinals	Semifinals	Finals	
Athlete	Event	Score	Seed	Opposition Score	Opposition Score	Opposition Score	Opposition Score	Opposition Score	Rank
Nur Syahidah Alim	Women's individual compound	677	11	—	Lee (AUS); L (133-135)	Did not advance			

== Athletics ==
Singapore sent one male shot-putter in the games.

Key

- Note–Ranks given for track events are within the athlete's heat only
- Q = Qualified for the next round
- q = Qualified for the next round as a fastest loser or, in field events, by position without achieving the qualifying target
- DQ = Disqualified
- PR = Paralympic Record
- AR = Area (or continental) Record
- NR = National Record
- SB = Season's Best
- N/A = Round not applicable for the event
- Bye = Athlete not required to compete in round

Men's field

Athlete	Event	Final	
Athlete	Event	Result	Rank
Muhammad Diroy Noordin	Shot put F40	8.68m	9

== Boccia ==
Singapore entered one athlete into the Paralympic games, after nominating top two individual athletes in women's individual BC1 events, through the final world ranking.

Athlete	Event	Pool matches						Quarterfinals	Semifinals	Final / BM	
Athlete	Event	Opposition Score	Opposition Score	Opposition Score	Opposition Score	Opposition Score	Rank	Opposition Score	Opposition Score	Opposition Score	Rank
Jeralyn Tan	Women's individual BC1	Aubert (FRA); W (6–1)	Arrieta (ESP); W (5–1)	—	—	—	1 Q	Oliveira (BRA); W (7–5)	Endo (JPN); W (5–1)	Aubert (FRA); L (4–5)	2nd place, silver medalist(s)

== Equestrian ==
Singapore entered a full squad of four para-equestrians into the Paralympics, as the highest Asian team not yet qualified through final world para dressage rankings.

Individual

Athlete	Horse	Event	Total	
Athlete	Horse	Event	Score	Rank
Laurentia Tan	Hickstead	Individual championship test grade I	72.000%	5
Laurentia Tan	Hickstead	Individual freestyle test grade I	73.174%	8
Gemma Rose Foo	Banestro	Individual championship test grade I	68.917%	11
Gemma Rose Foo	Banestro	Individual freestyle test grade I	Did not advance	
Hilary Su	Gambler	Individual championship test grade III	61.700%	12
Hilary Su	Gambler	Individual freestyle test grade III	Did not advance	

Team

Athlete	Horse	Event	Individual score	Total	
Athlete	Horse	Event	TT	Score	Rank
Laurentia Tan	See above	Team			
Gemma Rose Foo	See above	Team			
Hilary Su	See above	Team			

== Shooting ==
For the first time in Singaporean Paralympics history, Singapore entered one para-shooter after achieving a quota place by virtue of finishes at the 2022, 2023 and 2024 World Cup, 2022 World Championships, 2023 World Championships and 2022 Asian Para Games, as long as they obtained the minimum qualifying score (MQS).

Men

Athlete	Event	Qualification		Final	
Athlete	Event	Points	Rank	Points	Rank
Daniel Chan	P1 – 10 m air pistol SH1	561	10	Did not advance	

== Swimming ==
Singapore entered three athletes by virtue of their results at the 2023 World Para Swimming Championships, after finishes in the top two places in Paralympic class disciplines; and through the Minimum Qualification Standard (MQS) allocation slots.

Men

Athlete	Events	Heats		Final	
Athlete	Events	Time	Rank	Time	Rank
Toh Wei Soong	50 m freestyle S7	29.74	8 Q	29.51	8
Toh Wei Soong	100 m backstroke S7	1:16.24	9	Did not advance	
Toh Wei Soong	50 m butterfly S7	31.66	4 Q	30.96	8

Women

Athlete	Event	Heats		Final	
Athlete	Event	Result	Rank	Result	Rank
Yip Pin Xiu	50 m backstroke S2	1:05.06	1 Q	1:05.99	1st place, gold medalist(s)
Yip Pin Xiu	100 m backstroke S2	2:18.19	1 Q	2:21.73	1st place, gold medalist(s)
Sophie Soon	100 m breaststroke SB12	1:31.83	8 Q	1:30.42	7

== See also ==
- Singapore at the 2024 Summer Olympics
- Singapore at the Paralympics
