= Singapore at the 2008 Summer Paralympics =

- IPC code: SIN
- NPC: Singapore National Paralympic Council

in Beijing
- Competitors: 6 in 4 sports
- Medals Ranked 46th: Gold 1 Silver 1 Bronze 2 Total 4

Summer Paralympics appearances (overview)
- 1988; 1992; 1996; 2000; 2004; 2008; 2012; 2016; 2020; 2024

Singapore sent a delegation to compete at the 2008 Summer Paralympics in Beijing, represented by six athletes competing in four sports: swimming, sailing, equestrian and athletics. The country's flagbearer at the Games' opening ceremony was supposed to be Desiree Lim, a sailor. However, as the sailing events were held in Qingdao, it was Theresa Goh (swimming) who was the flagbearer on that day. The 2008 Summer Paralympics marked the first time Singapore had won a Paralympic medal of any kind.

Yip Pin Xiu won two medals for swimming; gold in the women's 50 meter backstroke S3 and silver in the women's 50 meter freestyle S3. Laurentia Tan won two bronze medals in equestrian. Due to the efforts by the medal winners, Yip was awarded the Meritorious Service Medal and Tan awarded the Public Service Medal.

== Medalists ==
Medal	Name	Sport	Event	Date
Gold	Yip Pin Xiu	Swimming	Women's 50m Backstroke S3	15 September
Silver	Yip Pin Xiu	Swimming	Women's 50m Freestyle S3	13 September
Bronze	Laurentia Tan	Equestrian	Individual Championship Test Grade 1A	9 September
Bronze	Laurentia Tan	Equestrian	Individual Freestyle Test Grade 1A	11 September

== Sports ==
=== Athletics ===
Athlete	Class	Event	Heats		Final	
Athlete	Class	Event	Result	Rank	Result	Rank
Chee Keong Eric Ting	T52	400m	1:29.89	13	did not advance	

=== Equestrian ===
Athlete	Horse	Event	Total	
Athlete	Horse	Event	Score	Rank
Laurentia Tan	Nothing To Lose	Mixed individual championship test grade Ia	68.800	3rd place, bronze medalist(s)
Laurentia Tan	Nothing To Lose	Mixed individual freestyle test grade Ia	70.167	3rd place, bronze medalist(s)

=== Sailing ===
Singaporeans will compete in the following event in sailing:

- Lim Kok Liang Desiree - Two-Person Keelboat - SKUD18
- Tan Wei Qiang Jovin - Two-Person Keelboat - SKUD18

=== Swimming ===
==== Women ====
Athlete	Class	Event	Heats		Final	
Athlete	Class	Event	Result	Rank	Result	Rank
Theresa Goh	S5	50m freestyle	53.67	13	did not advance	
Theresa Goh	S5	100m freestyle	1:33.20	6 Q	1:32.92	6
Theresa Goh	S5	200m freestyle	3:18.51	4 Q	3:14.22	4
Yip Pin Xiu	S3	50m freestyle	57.04 WR	1 Q	57.43	2nd place, silver medalist(s)
Yip Pin Xiu	S3	50m backstroke	57.92 WR	1 Q	58.75	1st place, gold medalist(s)

== See also ==
- 2008 Summer Paralympics
- Singapore at the Paralympics
- Singapore at the 2008 Summer Olympics
