= Equestrian at the 2008 Summer Paralympics – Individual championship test grade Ia =

Individual Championship Test Grade Ia at the XIII Paralympic Games
- Paralympic Equestrian
- Venue: Hong Kong Olympic Equestrian Centre
- Dates: 9 September 2008
- Competitors: 13 from 10 nations

Medalists
1st place, gold medalist(s)		Anne Dunham	Great Britain
2nd place, silver medalist(s)		Sophie Christiansen	Great Britain
3rd place, bronze medalist(s)		Laurentia Tan	Singapore

The Equestrian Individual Championship Test Grade Ia event at the 2008 Summer Paralympics was held in the Hong Kong Olympic Equestrian Centre on 9 September at 17:00.

The competition was assessed by a ground jury composed of five judges placed at locations designated E, H, C, M, and B. Each judge rated the competitors' performances with a percentage score. The five scores from the jury were then averaged to determine a rider's total percentage score.

The event was won by Anne Dunham, representing Great Britain.

== Ground jury ==
Judge at E	Kjell Myhre ( Norway)
Judge at H	Liliana Iannone ( Argentina)
Judge at C	Gudrun Hofinga ( Germany), jury president
Judge at M	Hanneke Gerritsen ( Netherlands)
Judge at B	Janet Geary ( Australia)

== Results ==
T = Team Member (see Equestrian at the 2008 Summer Paralympics – Team).

Rank	Rider	Horse	Percentage score (and rank)					Total % score	Note
Rank	Rider	Horse	E	H	C	M	B	Total % score	Note
1st place, gold medalist(s)	Anne Dunham (GBR)	Teddy	73.500 (1)	73.500 (1)	72.000 (1)	74.000 (1)	72.500 (2)	73.100	T
2nd place, silver medalist(s)	Sophie Christiansen (GBR)	Lambrusco III	73.000 (2)	73.000 (2)	71.500 (2)	73.500 (2)	73.000 (1)	72.800	T
3rd place, bronze medalist(s)	Laurentia Tan (SIN)	Nothing To Lose	68.000 (3)	72.500 (3)	68.500 (3)	67.000 (3)	68.000 (3)	68.800	
4	Andrea Vigon (ITA)	Priool	65.000 (5)	61.500 (8)	64.000 (6)	64.500 (4)	64.000 (4)	63.800	T
5	Slaven Hudina (CRO)	Tulasi	65.500 (4)	64.000 (6)	64.500 (5)	61.500 (6)	63.000 (5)	63.700	
6	Ivan Srsic (CRO)	Kraljica Kunti	63.500 (6)	57.000 (9)	65.000 (4)	59.500 (7)	62.500 (6)	61.500	
7	Katarina Jobbagyova (SVK)	Timpex Libbeno	58.500 (8)	65.000 (5)	61.000 (8)	62.500 (5)	59.500 (9)	61.300	
8	Sergio Oliva (BRA)	Neho De La J.	62.000 (7)	68.500 (4)	57.000 (10)	57.000 (9)	60.000 (7)	60.900	T
9	Jan Pike (AUS)	Griffin	58.000 (9)	62.000 (7)	63.000 (7)	57.000 (9)	60.000 (7)	60.000	
10	Sandy Mitchell (BER)	Highland Fling	56.500 (10)	56.000 (10)	57.500 (9)	56.000 (11)	57.000 (11)	56.600	
11	Mauro Caredda (ITA)	Garfielt	55.500 (11)	54.500 (11)	52.500 (11)	59.000 (8)	57.500 (10)	55.800	T
12	Mark Frenzel (RSA)	Waldfee 697	51.500 (12)	52.500 (12)	51.500 (12)	52.000 (12)	53.000 (12)	52.100	T
13	Mariya Zagorskaya (RUS)	Bazalt	46.500 (13)	46.500 (13)	43.500 (13)	50.500 (13)	48.000 (13)	47.000	
