= Equestrian at the 2012 Summer Paralympics – Individual championship test grade Ia =

Equestrian – Individual championship test, grade Ia at the XIV Paralympic Games
- Venue: Greenwich Park
- Date: 2 September 2012
- Competitors: 14 from 12 nations
- Winning score: 82.750

Medalists
1st place, gold medalist(s)		Sophie Christiansen	Great Britain
2nd place, silver medalist(s)		Helen Kearney	Ireland
3rd place, bronze medalist(s)		Laurentia Tan	Singapore

The individual championship test, grade Ia, para-equestrian dressage event at the 2012 Summer Paralympics was contested on 2 September at Greenwich Park in London.

The competition was assessed by a ground jury composed of five judges placed at locations designated E, H, C, M, and B. Each judge rated the competitors' performances with a percentage score. The five scores from the jury were then averaged to determine a rider's total percentage score.

== Ground jury ==
Judge at E	Carlos Lopes ( Portugal)
Judge at H	Lilian Iannone ( Argentina)
Judge at C	Sarah Rodger ( Great Britain), jury president
Judge at M	Anne Prain ( France)
Judge at B	Kjell Myhre ( Norway)

== Results ==
T = Team Member (see Equestrian at the 2012 Summer Paralympics – Team).

Rank	Rider	Horse	Percentage score (and rank)					Total % score	Note
Rank	Rider	Horse	E	H	C	M	B	Total % score	Note
1st place, gold medalist(s)	Sophie Christiansen (GBR)	Janeiro 6	81.000 (1)	79.500 (2)	79.000 (1)	91.750 (1)	82.500 (1)	82.750	T
2nd place, silver medalist(s)	Helen Kearney (IRL)	Mister Cool	77.750 (3)	81.500 (1)	76.000 (2)	75.250 (2)	73.000 (2)	76.700	T
3rd place, bronze medalist(s)	Laurentia Tan (SIN)	Ruben James 2	78.750 (2)	76.000 (3)	70.500 (4)	75.250 (2)	67.750 (10)	73.650	T
4	Rihards Snikus (LAT)	Chardonnay	66.500 (10)	74.750 (4)	69.750 (5)	71.500 (4)	69.500 (5)	70.400	
5	Liselotte Rosenhart (DEN)	Priors Lady Rawage	70.250 (5)	69.000 (8)	72.000 (3)	69.750 (9)	69.000 (6)	70.000	T
6	Donna Ponessa (USA)	Western Rose	71.750 (4)	69.250 (6)	68.000 (9)	70.500 (6)	66.500 (12)	69.200	T
7	Geraldine Savage (IRL)	Blues Tip Top Too	67.500 (7)	69.000 (8)	68.500 (8)	70.500 (6)	68.500 (7)	68.800	T
8	Sara Morganti (ITA)	Royal Delight	67.750 (6)	70.500 (5)	69.500 (6)	67.500 (13)	68.000 (8)	68.650	T
9	Anita Johnsson (SWE)	Donar	64.750 (12)	68.250 (11)	68.750 (7)	68.750 (10)	69.750 (4)	68.050	
10	Sergio Froes Ribeiro de Oliva (BRA)	Emily	67.250 (8)	68.750 (10)	66.750 (10)	68.750 (10)	67.000 (11)	67.700	T
11	Jody Schloss (CAN)	Inspector Rebus	67.250 (8)	63.000 (13)	66.250 (11)	70.750 (5)	71.250 (3)	67.700	T
12	Rob Oakley (AUS)	Statford Mantovani	65.750 (11)	69.250 (6)	66.000 (12)	70.250 (8)	65.250 (13)	67.300	T
13	Gemma Rose Jen Foo (SIN)	Avalon	62.500 (14)	63.000 (13)	63.750 (13)	68.000 (12)	68.000 (8)	65.050	T
14	Pui Ting Natasha Tse (HKG)	Undulette	63.500 (13)	66.250 (12)	62.250 (14)	63.500 (14)	64.500 (14)	64.000	
