= Equestrian at the 2012 Summer Paralympics – Individual freestyle test grade Ia =

Equestrian – Individual freestyle test, grade Ia at the XIV Paralympic Games
- Venue: Greenwich Park
- Date: 4 September 2012
- Competitors: 14 from 12 nations
- Winning score: 84.750

Medalists
1st place, gold medalist(s)		Sophie Christiansen	Great Britain
2nd place, silver medalist(s)		Laurentia Tan	Singapore
3rd place, bronze medalist(s)		Helen Kearney	Ireland

The individual freestyle test, grade Ia, para-equestrian dressage event at the 2012 Summer Paralympics was contested on 4 September at Greenwich Park in London.

The competition was assessed by a ground jury composed of five judges placed at locations designated E, H, C, M, and B. Each judge rated the competitors' performances with percentage scores for technical difficulty and artistic merit. The ten scores from the jury were then averaged to determine a rider's total percentage score.

== Ground jury ==
Judge at E	Kjell Myhre ( Norway)
Judge at H	Lilian Iannone ( Argentina)
Judge at C	Gudrun Hofinga ( Germany), jury president
Judge at M	Sarah Rodger ( Great Britain)
Judge at B	Freddy Leyman ( Belgium)

== Results ==
Rank	Rider	Horse		Technical/Artistic & (Rank)					Tech/Art % (Rk)	Total % score
Rank	Rider	Horse		E	H	C	M	B	Tech/Art % (Rk)	Total % score
1st place, gold medalist(s)	Sophie Christiansen (GBR)	Janeiro 6		85.000 (1)	84.000 (1)	87.500 (1)	80.750 (1)	86.500 (1)		84.750
1st place, gold medalist(s)	Sophie Christiansen (GBR)	Janeiro 6	Tech:	81.000 (1)	83.000 (1)	82.000 (1)	78.000 (2)	83.500 (1)	81.500 (1)	
1st place, gold medalist(s)	Sophie Christiansen (GBR)	Janeiro 6	Art:	89.000 (1)	85.000 (2)	93.000 (1)	83.500 (1)	89.500 (1)	88.000 (1)	
2nd place, silver medalist(s)	Laurentia Tan (SIN)	Ruben James 2		79.500 (2)	79.750 (3)	82.000 (2)	75.000 (3)	78.750 (2)		79.000
2nd place, silver medalist(s)	Laurentia Tan (SIN)	Ruben James 2	Tech:	77.500 (2)	81.000 (2)	80.500 (2)	76.000 (3)	78.500 (2)	78.700 (2)	
2nd place, silver medalist(s)	Laurentia Tan (SIN)	Ruben James 2	Art:	81.500 (2)	78.500 (3)	83.500 (2)	74.000 (4)	79.000 (3)	79.300 (3)	
3rd place, bronze medalist(s)	Helen Kearney (IRL)	Mister Cool		76.500 (3)	83.500 (2)	75.000 (4)	79.250 (2)	78.000 (3)		78.450
3rd place, bronze medalist(s)	Helen Kearney (IRL)	Mister Cool	Tech:	74.500 (3)	81.000 (2)	74.000 (4)	79.000 (1)	75.500 (3)	76.800 (3)	
3rd place, bronze medalist(s)	Helen Kearney (IRL)	Mister Cool	Art:	78.500 (3)	86.000 (1)	76.000 (4)	79.500 (2)	80.500 (2)	80.100 (2)	
4	Sara Morganti (ITA)	Royal Delight		72.750 (4)	71.750 (7)	76.250 (3)	73.750 (4)	75.000 (4)		73.900
4	Sara Morganti (ITA)	Royal Delight	Tech:	71.000 (4)	71.000 (7)	74.500 (3)	74.000 (4)	74.000 (4)	72.900 (4)	
4	Sara Morganti (ITA)	Royal Delight	Art:	74.500 (5)	72.500 (7)	78.000 (3)	73.500 (5)	76.000 (5)	74.900 (5)	
5	Geraldine Savage (IRL)	Blues Tip Top Too		70.500 (6)	73.500 (5)	71.500 (5)	72.250 (7)	73.750 (5)		72.300
5	Geraldine Savage (IRL)	Blues Tip Top Too	Tech:	68.000 (6)	70.000 (8)	69.000 (6)	71.000 (7)	71.500 (5)	69.900 (5)	
5	Geraldine Savage (IRL)	Blues Tip Top Too	Art:	73.000 (6)	77.000 (4)	74.000 (5)	73.500 (5)	76.000 (5)	74.700 (6)	
6	Rihards Snikus (LAT)	Chardonnay		72.500 (5)	75.500 (4)	67.250 (11)	72.750 (6)	72.250 (6)		72.050
6	Rihards Snikus (LAT)	Chardonnay	Tech:	68.000 (6)	74.000 (4)	66.000 (10)	70.500 (8)	67.000 (9)	69.100 (8)	
6	Rihards Snikus (LAT)	Chardonnay	Art:	77.000 (4)	77.000 (4)	68.500 (11)	75.000 (3)	77.500 (4)	75.000 (4)	
7	Sergio Froes Ribeiro De Oliva (BRA)	Emily		69.500 (8)	73.000 (6)	71.250 (6)	72.000 (8)	70.000 (9)		71.150
7	Sergio Froes Ribeiro De Oliva (BRA)	Emily	Tech:	68.000 (6)	71.500 (6)	69.500 (5)	71.500 (6)	67.500 (8)	69.600 (7)	
7	Sergio Froes Ribeiro De Oliva (BRA)	Emily	Art:	71.000 (8)	74.500 (6)	73.000 (6)	72.500 (8)	72.500 (8)	72.700 (7)	
8	Donna Ponessa (USA)	Western Rose		70.250 (7)	71.750 (7)	67.500 (10)	73.000 (5)	71.250 (7)		70.750
8	Donna Ponessa (USA)	Western Rose	Tech:	69.000 (5)	72.500 (5)	66.000 (10)	72.500 (5)	68.500 (7)	69.700 (6)	
8	Donna Ponessa (USA)	Western Rose	Art:	71.500 (7)	71.000 (8)	69.000 (9)	73.500 (5)	74.000 (7)	71.800 (8)	
9	Rob Oakley (AUS)	Statford Mantovani		68.750 (10)	65.000 (12)	68.750 (8)	69.000 (9)	71.250 (7)		68.550
9	Rob Oakley (AUS)	Statford Mantovani	Tech:	67.500 (10)	65.500 (11)	67.500 (8)	68.000 (9)	71.000 (6)	67.900 (9)	
9	Rob Oakley (AUS)	Statford Mantovani	Art:	70.000 (9)	64.500 (12)	70.000 (8)	70.000 (9)	71.500 (9)	69.200 (9)	
10	Anita Johnsson (SWE)	Donar		68.500 (11)	63.500 (14)	70.000 (7)	66.500 (11)	65.500 (11)		66.800
10	Anita Johnsson (SWE)	Donar	Tech:	67.000 (11)	63.500 (14)	67.500 (8)	68.000 (9)	63.000 (11)	65.800 (11)	
10	Anita Johnsson (SWE)	Donar	Art:	70.000 (9)	63.500 (13)	72.500 (7)	65.000 (12)	68.000 (10)	67.800 (10)	
11	Jody Schloss (CAN)	Inspector Rebus		67.750 (12)	65.000 (12)	68.750 (8)	65.250 (13)	65.750 (10)		66.500
11	Jody Schloss (CAN)	Inspector Rebus	Tech:	66.500 (12)	64.000 (13)	68.500 (7)	67.000 (11)	64.000 (10)	66.000 (10)	
11	Jody Schloss (CAN)	Inspector Rebus	Art:	69.000 (12)	66.000 (11)	69.000 (9)	63.500 (14)	67.500 (12)	67.000 (11)	
12	Gemma Rose Jen Foo (SIN)	Avalon		69.000 (9)	69.500 (9)	61.500 (13)	65.500 (12)	63.500 (14)		65.800
12	Gemma Rose Jen Foo (SIN)	Avalon	Tech:	68.000 (6)	68.000 (9)	60.500 (13)	66.000 (12)	61.500 (14)	64.800 (12)	
12	Gemma Rose Jen Foo (SIN)	Avalon	Art:	70.000 (9)	71.000 (8)	62.500 (13)	65.000 (12)	65.500 (14)	66.800 (12)	
13	Liselotte Rosenhart (DEN)	Priors Lady Rawage		63.500 (14)	65.500 (11)	63.750 (12)	67.500 (10)	65.250 (12)		65.100
13	Liselotte Rosenhart (DEN)	Priors Lady Rawage	Tech:	62.500 (14)	68.000 (9)	62.000 (12)	65.500 (13)	62.500 (12)	64.100 (13)	
13	Liselotte Rosenhart (DEN)	Priors Lady Rawage	Art:	64.500 (14)	63.000 (14)	65.500 (12)	69.500 (10)	68.000 (10)	66.100 (13)	
14	Tse Pui Ting Natasha (HKG)	Undulette		65.000 (13)	65.750 (10)	60.250 (14)	64.750 (14)	64.500 (13)		64.050
14	Tse Pui Ting Natasha (HKG)	Undulette	Tech:	63.000 (13)	64.500 (12)	58.000 (14)	63.500 (14)	62.000 (13)	62.200 (14)	
14	Tse Pui Ting Natasha (HKG)	Undulette	Art:	67.000 (13)	67.000 (10)	62.500 (13)	66.000 (11)	67.000 (13)	65.900 (14)	
