= Denmark at the 2012 Summer Paralympics =

- IPC code: DEN
- NPC: Paralympic Committee Denmark
- Website: www.paralympic.dk

in London
- Competitors: 28 in 8 sports
- Flag bearer: Peter Rosenmeier
- Medals Ranked 50th: Gold 1 Silver 0 Bronze 4 Total 5

Summer Paralympics appearances (overview)
- 1968; 1972; 1976; 1980; 1984; 1988; 1992; 1996; 2000; 2004; 2008; 2012; 2016; 2020; 2024

Denmark competed at the 2012 Summer Paralympics in London, United Kingdom from August 29 to September 9, 2012.

== Medalists ==
Medal	Name	Sport	Event
Gold	Jackie Christiansen	Athletics	Men's shot put F42/44
Bronze	Daniel Jørgensen	Athletics	Men's long jump F42/44
Bronze	Annika Dalskov	Equestrian	Mixed individual championships Grade III
Bronze	Annika Dalskov	Equestrian	Mixed individual freestyle test Grade III
Bronze	Peter Rosenmeier	Table tennis	Men's singles C6

== Athletics ==
Men's track

Athlete	Event	Heats		Final	
Athlete	Event	Result	Rank	Result	Rank
Mikael Andersen	1500m T11	4:17.44	3 q	4:16.12	6
Mikael Andersen	5000m T11	—N/a		16:11.47	7
Daniel Jørgensen	100m T42	13.21	5	Did not advance	
Daniel Jørgensen	200m T42	—N/a		26.46	7

Men's field

Athlete	Event	Final		
Athlete	Event	Result	Points	Rank
Jackie Christiansen	Shot put F42-44	18.16	1012	1st place, gold medalist(s)
Jacob Dahl	Javelin throw F54-56	17.73	-	14
Jacob Dahl	Shot put F54-56	9.00	903	12
Ronni Jensen	Discus throw F37-38	42.51	898	10
Daniel Jørgensen	Long jump F42/44	6.11	959	3rd place, bronze medalist(s)

Women's track

Athlete	Event	Heats		Final	
Athlete	Event	Result	Rank	Result	Rank
Marianne Maibøll	100m T54	19.07	6	Did not advance	
Marianne Maibøll	400m T54	1:02.35	6	Did not advance	
Marianne Maibøll	800m T54	2:06.88	4	Did not advance	

== Cycling ==
Athlete	Event	Time	Rank
Thomas Gerlach	Road race H3	2:03.49	7
Thomas Gerlach	Road time trial H3	28:10.82	6
Alan Schmidt	Mixed road race T1-2	DNF	
Alan Schmidt	Mixed road time trial T1-2	18:45.77	17

== Equestrian ==
Individual events

Athlete	Horse	Event	Total	
Athlete	Horse	Event	Score	Rank
Annika Dalskov	Aros A Fenris	Individual championship test grade III	71.233	3rd place, bronze medalist(s)
Annika Dalskov	Aros A Fenris	Individual freestyle test grade III	76.950	3rd place, bronze medalist(s)
Caroline Nielsen	Leon	Individual championship test grade II	69.048	10
Caroline Nielsen	Leon	Individual freestyle test grade II	64.850	13
Liselotte Rosenhart	Priors Lady Rawage	Individual championship test grade Ia	70.000	5
Liselotte Rosenhart	Priors Lady Rawage	Individual freestyle test grade Ia	65.100	13
Susanne Sunesen	Thy's Que Faire	Individual championship test grade III	69.700	4
Susanne Sunesen	Thy's Que Faire	Individual freestyle test grade III	73.550	5
Line Thorning Jørgensen	Di Caprio	Individual championship test grade IV	70.258	5
Line Thorning Jørgensen	Di Caprio	Individual freestyle test grade IV	76.800	4

Team

Athlete	Horse	Event	Individual score			Total	
Athlete	Horse	Event	TT	CT	Score	Total	Rank
Annika Dalskov	See above	Team	72.889	71.233	144.122	424.819	6
Liselotte Rosenhart	See above	Team	68.765	70.000	138.765	424.819	6
Susanne Sunesen	See above	Team	71.333	69.700	141.003	424.819	6
Line Thorning Jørgensen	See above	Team	69.406	70.258	139.664	424.819	6

== Goalball ==
=== Women's tournament ===
Women's team

- Karina Jørgensen
- Maria Larsen
- Mette Præstegaard Nissen
- Kamilla Bradt Ryding
- Elisabeth Weichel

Group C

Team	Pld	W	D	L	GF	GA	GD	Pts	Qualification
China	4	4	0	0	28	4	+24	12	Quarterfinals
Great Britain	4	2	1	1	10	9	+1	7	Quarterfinals
Brazil	4	2	0	2	8	15	−7	6	Quarterfinals
Finland	4	1	1	2	10	13	−3	4	Quarterfinals
Denmark	4	0	0	4	3	18	−15	0	Eliminated

Source: "London 2012 Paralympic Games - Goalball results" (PDF). Paralympic.org. 2012-10-03 – via Goalball.sport.

30 August 2012; 19:45	Denmark	0 – 2	Brazil	Copper Box, London; Referees: Hooshang Shariati (IRI), Vilma Venckutonyte (LTU)
30 August 2012; 19:45		Report	Bonfim Vieira dos Santos 2	Copper Box, London; Referees: Hooshang Shariati (IRI), Vilma Venckutonyte (LTU)

1 September 2012; 21:00	Denmark	2 – 3	Finland	Copper Box, London; Referees: Christl Daentler (GER), Tony Connolly (USA)
1 September 2012; 21:00	Jørgensen 2	Report	Leppänen 2 Heikkinen 1	Copper Box, London; Referees: Christl Daentler (GER), Tony Connolly (USA)

3 September 2012; 13:45	China	8 – 1	Denmark	Copper Box, London; Referees: Tony Connolly (USA), Ali Aldarsony (KSA)
3 September 2012; 13:45	Chen 4 Wang S. 3 Ju 1	Report	Jørgensen 1	Copper Box, London; Referees: Tony Connolly (USA), Ali Aldarsony (KSA)

4 September 2012; 09:00	Great Britain	5 – 0	Denmark	Copper Box, London; Referees: Kimberly Anderson (USA), Shinji Mizuno (JPN)
4 September 2012; 09:00	Sharkey 3 Luke 1 Ottaway 1	Report		Copper Box, London; Referees: Kimberly Anderson (USA), Shinji Mizuno (JPN)

== Sailing ==
Athlete	Event	Race											Total points	Net points Total	Rank
Athlete	Event	1	2	3	4	5	6	7	8	9	10	11	Total points	Net points Total	Rank
Jens Als Andersen	2.4mR	13	(14)	9	14	2	10	9	14	5	21	—N/a	101	87	11

== Shooting ==
Athlete	Event	Qualification		Final		
Athlete	Event	Score	Rank	Score	Total	Rank
Jonas Andersen	Mixed 10m air rifle prone SH2	600 (-55x)	=1	Did not advance		
Berit Gejl	Mixed 50m rifle prone SH1	567	46	Did not advance		

== Swimming ==
Men

Athlete	Event	Heats		Final	
Athlete	Event	Result	Rank	Result	Rank
Lasse Andersen	50m freestyle S9	26.19	6	Did not advance	
Lasse Andersen	100m freestyle S9	56.99	6	Did not advance	
Lasse Andersen	100m backstroke S9	1:06.41	5	Did not advance	
Lasse Andersen	100m butterfly S10	1:00.01	4	Did not advance	
Mikkel Asmussen	100m backstroke S8	1:12.09	5 Q	1:12.44	8
Mikkel Asmussen	100m butterfly S8	DNS		Did not advance	
Mikkel Asmussen	100m breaststroke SB7	1:30.37	6	Did not advance	
Jonas Larsen	50m freestyle S5	40.48	7	Did not advance	
Jonas Larsen	100m freestyle S5	1:28.49	5	Did not advance	
Jonas Larsen	200m freestyle S5	3:15.56	5	Did not advance	
Jonas Larsen	50m backstroke S5	42.56	2 Q	42.93	7
Jonas Larsen	150m individual medley SM4	2:47.11	4 Q	2:46.15	6
Niels Mortensen	50m freestyle S8	29.24	7	Did not advance	
Niels Mortensen	100m freestyle S8	1:04.36	6	Did not advance	
Niels Mortensen	100m backstroke S8	1:11.56	3 Q	1:10.63	6
Niels Mortensen	100m butterfly S8	1:08.75	5	Did not advance	
Niels Mortensen	200m individual medley SM8	2:36.92	5	Did not advance	
Kasper Zysek	400m freestyle S9	4:24.27	4 Q	4:23.13	7
Lasse Andersen; Mikkel Asmussen; Niels Mortensen; Kasper Zysek	4x100m medley relay (34pts)	4:43.18	5	Did not advance	

Women

Athlete	Event	Heats		Final	
Athlete	Event	Result	Rank	Result	Rank
Amalie Vinther	50m freestyle S8	33.10	12	Did not advance	
Amalie Vinther	100m freestyle S8	1:12.25	4 Q	1:11.30	7
Amalie Vinther	400m freestyle S8	5:28.03	4	Did not advance	
Amalie Vinther	100m butterfly S8	1:23.74	7	Did not advance	
Amalie Vinther	200m individual medley SM8	3:15.24	6	Did not advance	

== Table tennis ==
Athlete	Event	Preliminaries				Quarterfinals	Semifinals	Final / BM	
Athlete	Event	Opposition Result	Opposition Result	Opposition Result	Rank	Opposition Result	Opposition Result	Opposition Result	Rank
Peter Rosenmeier	Men's singles C6	Bye				Lam (HKG); W 3-0	Thainiyom (THA); L 2-3	Grundeler (FRA); W 3-1	3rd place, bronze medalist(s)

== See also ==
- Denmark at the Paralympics
- Denmark at the 2012 Summer Olympics
