= Singapore at the 2016 Summer Paralympics =

- IPC code: SIN
- NPC: Singapore National Paralympic Council

in Rio de Janeiro
- Competitors: 13 in 6 sports
- Medals Ranked 46th: Gold 2 Silver 0 Bronze 1 Total 3

Summer Paralympics appearances (overview)
- 1988; 1992; 1996; 2000; 2004; 2008; 2012; 2016; 2020; 2024

Singapore competed at the 2016 Summer Paralympics in Rio de Janeiro, Brazil, from 7 September to 18 September 2016.

13 Singaporeans were sent to compete in six sports: archery, athletics, boccia, equestrian, sailing, and swimming.

== Disability classifications ==
Every participant at the Paralympics has their disability grouped into one of five disability categories; amputation, the condition may be congenital or sustained through injury or illness; cerebral palsy; wheelchair athletes, there is often overlap between this and other categories; visual impairment, including blindness; Les autres, any physical disability that does not fall strictly under one of the other categories, for example dwarfism or multiple sclerosis. Each Paralympic sport then has its own classifications, dependent upon the specific physical demands of competition. Events are given a code, made of numbers and letters, describing the type of event and classification of the athletes competing. Some sports, such as athletics, divide athletes by both the category and severity of their disabilities, other sports, for example swimming, group competitors from different categories together, the only separation being based on the severity of the disability.

== Medalists ==
| Medal | Name | Sport | Event | Date |
|---|---|---|---|---|
| Gold | Yip Pin Xiu | Swimming | Women's 100 metre backstroke S2 | 9 September |
| Gold | Yip Pin Xiu | Swimming | Women's 50m backstroke S2 | 16 September |
| Bronze | Theresa Goh Rui Si | Swimming | Women's 100m Breaststroke SB4 | 12 September |

== Archery ==
For the first time in history, Singapore qualified for the archery competition at a Paralympic Games. Nur Syahidah Binte Alim sealed gold in the women's compound open and compound mixed open at the 8th ASEAN Para Games, securing a historic spot for Singapore at Rio 2016.

Singapore sent a single archer to the 2016 Summer Paralympics: Nur Syahidah Alim, who competed in the women's individual compound open ranking.

== Athletics ==
Singapore sent three athletes to the 2016 Summer Paralympics: Norsilawati Sa'at for the women's 100m and 400m T52; Suhairi Suhani for the men's long jump T20; and Muhammad Diroy Noordin for the men's javelin throw F41 and shot put F40.

== Boccia ==
Two Singaporeans were sent to compete in boccia at the 2016 Summer Paralympics: Nurulasyiqah Taha, and Toh Sze Ning in the mixed pairs BC3.

== Equestrian ==
The country qualified to participate in the team event at the Rio Games.

Three Singaporeans were sent to compete in equestrian at the 2016 Summer Paralympics: Maximillian Tan, Laurentia Tan and Gemma Foo.

== Sailing ==
One pathway for qualifying for Rio involved having a boat have top seven finish at the 2015 Combined World Championships in a medal event where the country had nor already qualified through via the 2014 IFDS Sailing World Championships. Netherlands qualified for the 2016 Games under this criterion in the SKUD 18 event with a ninth-place finish overall and the third country who had not qualified via the 2014 Championships. The boat was crewed by Jovin Tan and Desiree Lim.

Singapore sent two sailors to the 2016 Summer Paralympics: Jovin Tan and Yap Qian Yin, for the 2-person keelboat (SKUD18) races.

== Swimming ==
Singapore sent two swimmers to the 2016 Summer Paralympics: Yip Pin Xiu and Theresa Goh.

On 10 September, Yip won a gold medal in the 100m backstroke, S2 finals with a world record of 2:07.09, with an additional world record for the 59.38 split for the first 50m of the race. On 12 September, Goh won a bronze medal in the SB4 100m breaststroke final, with a time of 1:55.55. While qualifying for the finals, she set a new Asian record in the heats at 1:54.50.

== See also ==
- Singapore at the 2016 Summer Olympics
