= Feng Yazhu =

Chinese Paralympic swimmer

Personal information
- Nationality: Chinese
- Born: 19 December 1992 (age 33) Tianjin, China

Sport
- Sport: Paralympic swimming
- Disability class: S2
Medal record
Women's Paralympic swimming
Representing China
Summer Paralympics
Gold medal – first place	2012 London	50 m backstroke S2
Silver medal – second place	2016 Rio de Janeiro	50 m backstroke S2
Silver medal – second place	2016 Rio de Janeiro	100 m backstroke S2
Bronze medal – third place	2020 Tokyo	50 m backstroke S2

Feng Yazhu (born 19 December 1992) is a Chinese Paralympic swimmer. She represented China at the Summer Paralympics.

== Career ==
Yazhu represented China at the 2012 Summer Paralympics in the 50 metre backstroke S2 event and won a gold medal. At the 2016 Summer Paralympics she won two silver medals in the 50 metre backstroke S2 and 100 metre backstroke S2 events. At the 2020 Summer Paralympics she won a bronze medal in the 50 metre backstroke S2 event.
