= Pepo Puch =

Austrian Paralympic equestrian

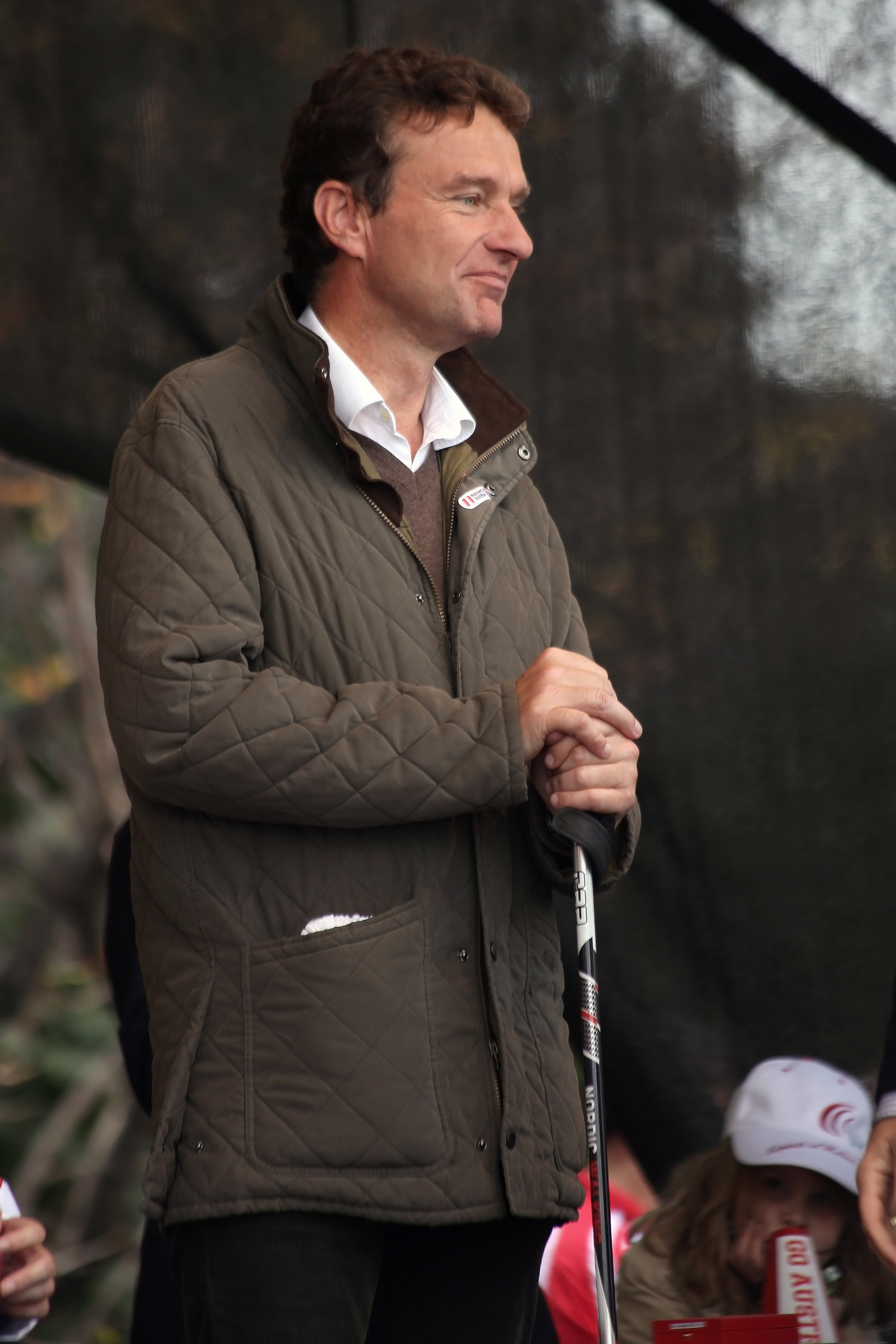
- Pepo Puch 2013

Personal information
- Nationality: Croatia / Austria
- Born: 10 January 1966 (age 60) Graz, Austria

Sport
- Country: Croatia / Austria
- Sport: Equestrian, Para-equestrian
Medal record
Representing Austria
Paralympic Games
Silver medal – second place	2020 Tokyo	Individual
Silver medal – second place	2016 Rio de Janeiro	Freestyle
Gold medal – first place	2016 Rio de Janeiro	Individual
Gold medal – first place	2012 London	Freestyle
Bronze medal – third place	2012 London	Individual

Josef "Pepo" Puch (born 10 January 1966 in Graz) is an Austrian-Croatian equestrian. He started in equestrian at fifteen.

Puch competed at the 2004 Summer Olympics for Croatia in the individual eventing with horse Banville D'Ivoy. He finished 63rd.

In 2008, Puch was in an accident and has incomplete paraplegia as a result. At the 2012 Summer Paralympics he won a gold medal and a bronze medal, this time competing for his birth country of Austria. At the 2016 Summer Paralympics he also won a gold medal in the individual championship test and a silver medal in the individual freestyle test grade 1b.
