= Singapore at the 2000 Summer Paralympics =

- IPC code: SIN
- NPC: Singapore Disability Sports Council

in Sydney
- Competitors: 3 in 2 sports
- Medals Ranked 69th: Gold 0 Silver 0 Bronze 0 Total 0

Summer Paralympics appearances (overview)
- 1988; 1992; 1996; 2000; 2004; 2008; 2012; 2016; 2020; 2024

Singapore competed at the 2000 Summer Paralympics in Sydney, Australia. Three competitors from Singapore competed in a total of two sports (athletics and cycling), and did not place in the medal table.

== Disability classifications ==
Every participant at the Paralympics has their disability grouped into one of five disability categories; amputation, the condition may be congenital or sustained through injury or illness; cerebral palsy; wheelchair athletes, there is often overlap between this and other categories; visual impairment, including blindness; Les autres, any physical disability that does not fall strictly under one of the other categories, for example dwarfism or multiple sclerosis. Each Paralympic sport then has its own classifications, dependent upon the specific physical demands of competition. Events are given a code, made of numbers and letters, describing the type of event and classification of the athletes competing. Some sports, such as athletics, divide athletes by both the category and severity of their disabilities, other sports, for example swimming, group competitors from different categories together, the only separation being based on the severity of the disability.

== Athletics ==
Name	Event and disability code	Round reached	Result
Azman Yusof	Men's 100 m T36	-	

== Cycling ==
Name	Event	Round reached	Position	Result
Noor Azmah Ahmad; Zaimoonisah Yussoff	-	-	-	-
Noor Azmah Ahmad; Zaimoonisah Yussoff	-	-	-	-
Noor Azmah Ahmad; Zaimoonisah Yussoff	-	-	-	-

== See also ==
- Singapore at the Paralympics
- Singapore at the 2000 Summer Olympics
