= Singapore at the 1992 Summer Paralympics =

- IPC code: SIN
- NPC: Singapore Disability Sports Council

in Barcelona
- Competitors: 4 in 1 sport
- Medals: Gold 0 Silver 0 Bronze 0 Total 0

Summer Paralympics appearances (overview)
- 1988; 1992; 1996; 2000; 2004; 2008; 2012; 2016; 2020; 2024

Singapore competed at the 1992 Summer Paralympics in Barcelona, Spain. 4 competitors from Singapore won no medals and so did not place in the medal table.

== Disability classifications ==
Every participant at the Paralympics has their disability grouped into one of five disability categories; amputation, the condition may be congenital or sustained through injury or illness; cerebral palsy; wheelchair athletes, there is often overlap between this and other categories; visual impairment, including blindness; Les autres, any physical disability that does not fall strictly under one of the other categories, for example dwarfism or multiple sclerosis. Each Paralympic sport then has its own classifications, dependent upon the specific physical demands of competition. Events are given a code, made of numbers and letters, describing the type of event and classification of the athletes competing. Some sports, such as athletics, divide athletes by both the category and severity of their disabilities, other sports, for example swimming, group competitors from different categories together, the only separation being based on the severity of the disability.

== Athletics ==
Name	Event and disability code	Round reached	Position	Result
Ong Bah Lee				
Raja Singh				
Tang See Chong				
Derek Yzelman				

== See also ==
- Singapore at the Paralympics
- Singapore at the 1992 Summer Olympics
