= Equestrian at the 2012 Summer Paralympics – Individual freestyle test grade Ib =

Equestrian – Individual freestyle test, grade Ib at the XIV Paralympic Games
- Venue: Greenwich Park
- Date: 3 September 2012
- Competitors: 15 from 13 nations
- Winning score: 79.150

Medalists
1st place, gold medalist(s)		Pepo Puch	Austria
2nd place, silver medalist(s)		Katja Karjalainen	Finland
3rd place, bronze medalist(s)		Lee Pearson	Great Britain

The individual freestyle test, grade Ib, para-equestrian dressage event at the 2012 Summer Paralympics was contested on 3 September at Greenwich Park in London.

The competition was assessed by a ground jury composed of five judges placed at locations designated E, H, C, M, and B. Each judge rated the competitors' performances with percentage scores for technical difficulty and artistic merit. The ten scores from the jury were then averaged to determine a rider's total percentage score.

== Ground jury ==
Judge at E	Lilian Iannone ( Argentina)
Judge at H	Freddy Leyman ( Belgium)
Judge at C	Anne Prain ( France), jury president
Judge at M	Sarah Rodger ( Great Britain)
Judge at B	Gudrun Hofinga ( Germany)

== Results ==
Rank	Rider	Horse		Technical/Artistic & (Rank)					Tech/Art % (Rk)	Total % score
Rank	Rider	Horse		E	H	C	M	B	Tech/Art % (Rk)	Total % score
1st place, gold medalist(s)	Pepo Puch (AUT)	Fine Feeling		79.250 (1)	80.750 (1)	76.250 (2)	78.250 (1)	81.250 (1)		79.150
1st place, gold medalist(s)	Pepo Puch (AUT)	Fine Feeling	Tech:	79.500 (1)	79.000 (1)	75.500 (2)	76.000 (1)	79.500 (1)	77.900 (1)	
1st place, gold medalist(s)	Pepo Puch (AUT)	Fine Feeling	Art:	79.000 (3)	82.500 (1)	77.000 (3)	80.500 (1)	83.000 (1)	80.400 (1)	
2nd place, silver medalist(s)	Katja Karjalainen (FIN)	Rosie		77.250 (3)	72.250 (5)	75.250 (3)	71.500 (3)	75.000 (3)		74.250
2nd place, silver medalist(s)	Katja Karjalainen (FIN)	Rosie	Tech:	74.000 (4)	69.500 (5)	72.000 (4)	70.500 (3)	71.500 (2)	71.500 (5)	
2nd place, silver medalist(s)	Katja Karjalainen (FIN)	Rosie	Art:	80.500 (1)	75.000 (4)	78.500 (2)	72.500 (3)	78.500 (3)	77.000 (2)	
3rd place, bronze medalist(s)	Lee Pearson (GBR)	Gentleman		78.250 (2)	77.750 (2)	73.750 (5)	65.250 (11)	76.000 (2)		74.200
3rd place, bronze medalist(s)	Lee Pearson (GBR)	Gentleman	Tech:	76.500 (2)	76.000 (2)	72.000 (4)	65.500 (10)	71.500 (2)	72.300 (3)	
3rd place, bronze medalist(s)	Lee Pearson (GBR)	Gentleman	Art:	80.000 (2)	79.500 (2)	75.500 (5)	65.000 (12)	80.500 (2)	76.100 (3)	
4	Joann Formosa (AUS)	Worldwide PB		68.500 (8)	76.750 (3)	77.750 (1)	73.250 (2)	72.250 (4)		73.700
4	Joann Formosa (AUS)	Worldwide PB	Tech:	70.500 (5)	74.500 (3)	76.000 (1)	73.000 (2)	71.000 (4)	73.000 (2)	
4	Joann Formosa (AUS)	Worldwide PB	Art:	66.500 (11)	79.000 (3)	79.500 (1)	73.500 (2)	73.500 (4)	74.400 (4)	
5	Jonathan Wentz (USA)	Richter Scale		74.750 (4)	73.250 (4)	74.750 (4)	70.000 (6)	72.250 (4)		73.000
5	Jonathan Wentz (USA)	Richter Scale	Tech:	75.000 (3)	71.500 (4)	73.000 (3)	68.500 (6)	71.000 (4)	71.800 (4)	
5	Jonathan Wentz (USA)	Richter Scale	Art:	74.500 (4)	75.000 (4)	76.500 (4)	71.500 (5)	73.500 (4)	74.200 (5)	
6	Ashley Gowanlock (CAN)	Maile		68.500 (8)	69.500 (7)	69.750 (7)	68.250 (7)	68.000 (7)		68.800
6	Ashley Gowanlock (CAN)	Maile	Tech:	68.500 (8)	68.000 (7)	68.500 (7)	68.000 (7)	66.000 (7)	67.800 (6)	
6	Ashley Gowanlock (CAN)	Maile	Art:	68.500 (7)	71.000 (7)	71.000 (7)	68.500 (8)	70.000 (7)	69.800 (8)	
7	Jaana Kivimaki (FIN)	Grivis		66.000 (11)	71.500 (6)	72.500 (6)	65.750 (10)	67.750 (8)		68.700
7	Jaana Kivimaki (FIN)	Grivis	Tech:	65.500 (11)	69.000 (6)	71.000 (6)	64.000 (11)	66.500 (6)	67.200 (7)	
7	Jaana Kivimaki (FIN)	Grivis	Art:	66.500 (11)	74.000 (6)	74.000 (6)	67.500 (10)	69.000 (9)	70.200 (6)	
8	Jens Lasse Dokkan (NOR)	Leopold		70.750 (5)	68.000 (8)	69.250 (8)	67.250 (9)	67.000 (9)		68.450
8	Jens Lasse Dokkan (NOR)	Leopold	Tech:	69.500 (7)	66.000 (8)	67.500 (8)	66.000 (9)	64.500 (9)	66.700 (9)	
8	Jens Lasse Dokkan (NOR)	Leopold	Art:	72.000 (5)	70.000 (8)	71.000 (7)	68.500 (8)	69.500 (8)	70.200 (6)	
9	Valerie Salles (FRA)	Menzana d'Hulm		67.750 (10)	66.500 (9)	68.500 (9)	70.250 (5)	66.500 (10)		67.900
9	Valerie Salles (FRA)	Menzana d'Hulm	Tech:	68.000 (10)	65.000 (9)	67.000 (9)	70.500 (3)	64.500 (9)	67.000 (8)	
9	Valerie Salles (FRA)	Menzana d'Hulm	Art:	67.500 (8)	68.000 (10)	70.000 (9)	70.000 (6)	68.500 (10)	68.800 (10)	
10	Marcos Fernandes Alves (BRA)	Luthenay de Vernay		68.750 (7)	64.750 (12)	65.500 (10)	70.750 (4)	69.250 (6)		67.800
10	Marcos Fernandes Alves (BRA)	Luthenay de Vernay	Tech:	68.500 (8)	63.500 (11)	63.000 (13)	69.000 (5)	66.000 (7)	66.000 (10)	
10	Marcos Fernandes Alves (BRA)	Luthenay de Vernay	Art:	69.000 (6)	66.000 (13)	68.000 (10)	72.500 (3)	72.500 (6)	69.600 (9)	
11	Salazar Pessoa Mesquita (BRA)	Dauerbrenner		69.000 (6)	64.750 (12)	63.750 (13)	67.750 (8)	66.250 (11)		66.300
11	Salazar Pessoa Mesquita (BRA)	Dauerbrenner	Tech:	70.500 (5)	63.000 (12)	63.500 (10)	66.500 (8)	64.500 (9)	65.600 (11)	
11	Salazar Pessoa Mesquita (BRA)	Dauerbrenner	Art:	67.500 (8)	66.500 (11)	64.000 (14)	69.000 (7)	68.000 (11)	67.000 (11)	
12	Nobumasa Asakawa (JPN)	Rosado		65.250 (13)	65.750 (10)	65.250 (11)	64.500 (12)	60.500 (14)		64.250
12	Nobumasa Asakawa (JPN)	Rosado	Tech:	65.000 (12)	61.500 (13)	63.500 (10)	63.000 (12)	60.000 (13)	62.600 (12)	
12	Nobumasa Asakawa (JPN)	Rosado	Art:	65.500 (13)	70.000 (8)	67.000 (11)	66.000 (11)	61.000 (14)	65.900 (12)	
13	Marion Milne (RSA)	Shadow		66.000 (11)	65.750 (10)	64.500 (12)	60.000 (14)	61.500 (13)		63.550
13	Marion Milne (RSA)	Shadow	Tech:	64.500 (13)	65.000 (9)	63.500 (10)	59.000 (13)	59.500 (14)	62.300 (13)	
13	Marion Milne (RSA)	Shadow	Art:	67.500 (8)	66.500 (11)	65.500 (12)	61.000 (14)	63.500 (13)	64.800 (13)	
14	Maximillian Tan (SIN)	Avalon		64.500 (14)	58.250 (14)	63.250 (14)	61.250 (13)	62.750 (12)		62.000
14	Maximillian Tan (SIN)	Avalon	Tech:	64.000 (14)	53.500 (15)	62.000 (14)	58.500 (14)	60.500 (12)	59.700 (14)	
14	Maximillian Tan (SIN)	Avalon	Art:	65.000 (14)	63.000 (14)	64.500 (13)	64.000 (13)	65.000 (12)	64.300 (14)	
15	Sara Duarte (POR)	Neapolitano Morella		61.750 (15)	51.500 (15)	55.000 (15)	55.500 (15)	53.000 (15)		55.350
15	Sara Duarte (POR)	Neapolitano Morella	Tech:	61.500 (15)	54.000 (14)	55.000 (15)	57.500 (15)	53.500 (15)	56.300 (15)	
15	Sara Duarte (POR)	Neapolitano Morella	Art:	62.000 (15)	49.000 (15)	55.000 (15)	53.500 (15)	52.500 (15)	54.400 (15)	
