= Deborah Criddle =

British para-equestrian

Medal record

Para-Dressage

Representing Great Britain

Summer Paralympics
Gold medal – first place	2004 Athens	Team championship
Gold medal – first place	2004 Athens	Championship test grade III
Gold medal – first place	2004 Athens	Freestyle test grade III
Gold medal – first place	2012 London	Team championship
Silver medal – second place	2012 London	Championship test grade III
Silver medal – second place	2012 London	Freestyle test grade III

Deborah Criddle MBE (born 10 May 1966) is a British para-equestrian who won three gold medals at the 2004 Summer Paralympics and three medals at the 2012 Summer Paralympics.

== Personal life ==
Criddle was born on 10 May 1966 in Taunton, Somerset, England. She lost the use of her right arm and right leg following a motorcycle accident in 1985, eventually having the arm amputated in 2003. As a result, she competes in the grade III Paralympic classification.

== Equestrianism ==
Criddle first competed at the Paralympics at the 2000 Games held in Sydney, where she finished eighth in the individual grade III event and fourth in the freestyle grade III. She won individual, freestyle and team gold medals at both the 2001 European Championships and the 2003 World Championships. At the 2004 Summer Paralympics in Athens, Greece, she won three gold medals. Riding the Nina Venables owned horse Figaro IX she won the individual and freestyle grade III events and was a part of Great Britain's victorious squad in the team championship. This made her and Figaro the first horse and rider combination to have won triple gold at consecutive European, World and Paralympic Games. At the 2008 Summer Paralympics in Beijing, China, she was selected to compete as an individual rider and she finished fifth in the individual and fourth in the freestyle.

She was selected as part of the dressage squad for Great Britain at the 2012 Summer Paralympics in London, United Kingdom. Riding LJT Akilles she won a silver medal in the grade III individual event with a score of 71.267%, finishing behind Germany's gold medallist Hannalore Brenner who scored 73.467%, despite having to ask the judges for directions. Criddle's result helped to secure a gold medal for the British squad, which also included Sophie Christiansen, Lee Pearson and Sophie Wells, in the team championship. She won her third medal of the 2012 Paralympics, a silver, in the freestyle grade III, on 4 September.

Criddle was appointed Member of the Order of the British Empire (MBE) in the 2013 New Year Honours for services to equestrianism.

== See also ==
- 2012 Summer Olympics and Paralympics gold post boxes
