= Singapore at the 2004 Summer Paralympics =

- IPC code: SIN
- NPC: Singapore Disability Sports Council

in Athens
- Competitors: 7 in 3 sports
- Medals Ranked 76th: Gold 0 Silver 0 Bronze 0 Total 0

Summer Paralympics appearances (overview)
- 1988; 1992; 1996; 2000; 2004; 2008; 2012; 2016; 2020; 2024

Singapore competed at the 2004 Summer Paralympics in Athens, Greece. The team included 7 athletes, 4 men and 3 women, but won no medals.

== Sports ==
=== Athletics ===
Azman Bin Yusof, Zaimoonisah Bte Mohamed Yussoff

=== Sailing ===
Leo Chen Ian, Lim Kok Liang, Sulaiman Bin Pungot, and Tan Wei Qiang Jovin

=== Swimming ===
Goh Rui Si Theresa

== See also ==
- Singapore at the Paralympics
- Singapore at the 2004 Summer Olympics
