= Anne Dunham =

British para-equestrian (1948–2025)

Anne Dunham OBE
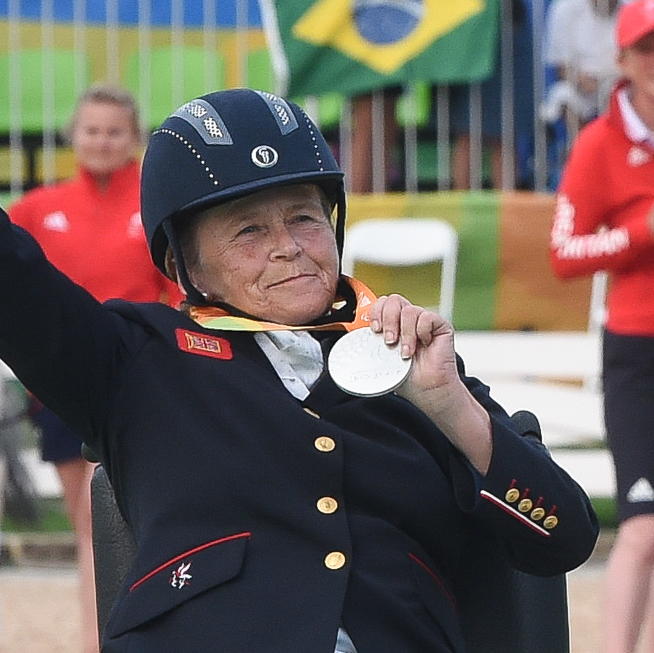
- Dunham in 2016

Personal information
- Full name: Anne Patricia Dunham
- Born: 24 September 1948 Tyne and Wear, England
- Died: 11 May 2025 (aged 76)
Medal record
Para equestrian
Representing Great Britain
Paralympic Games
| Gold medal – first place | 1996 Atlanta | Team open |
| Gold medal – first place | 2000 Sydney | Team open |
| Gold medal – first place | 2004 Athens | Team open |
| Gold medal – first place | 2008 Beijing | Championship test grade Ia |
| Gold medal – first place | 2008 Beijing | Team open |
| Gold medal – first place | 2016 Rio | Team |
| Silver medal – second place | 2008 Beijing | Freestyle test grade Ia |
| Silver medal – second place | 2016 Rio | Individual championship test grade Ia |
| Silver medal – second place | 2016 Rio | Individual freestyle test grade Ia |
| Bronze medal – third place | 1996 Atlanta | Kur trot grade II |

Anne Patricia Dunham (24 September 1948 – 11 May 2025) was a British Para-equestrian who competed in the Paralympic Games.

== Early life and disability ==
Whilst at school Dunham worked at a local stable in her spare time and, by the age of 16, she was running a yard of 80 horses at weekends. She said that she "always wanted to compete" but whilst she was able to ride the horses in the stables their owners competed with them. Dunham was diagnosed with multiple sclerosis at the age of 27 and used a wheelchair from the age of 30. At the age of forty, when her husband sold his business, she bought a horse and began to compete.

== Paralympic career ==
Dunham first competed at the Paralympics competing on Doodlebug in dressage events at the 1996 Atlanta Games where she won a bronze medal in the individual mixed Kur trot grade II, and gold in the open team event. In the individual mixed dressage grade II she finished just outside the medals in fourth position.

At the 2000 Summer Paralympics, in Sydney, Dunham was part of the team that successfully defended their title in the open team dressage event. In the individual events at the games she finished fifth both in the mixed dressage - championship grade II and mixed dressage - freestyle grade II.

The 2004 Athens Games were Dunham's third Paralympic appearance. As part of a team with Lee Pearson, Debbie Criddle and Nicola Tustain she won her third consecutive gold medal in the team dressage. Competing in the grade I freestyle and championship individual events she finished fifth and sixth respectively with fellow Briton Pearson winning gold in both.

Dunham went to her fourth Paralympics in 2008. The dressage events were not held in the host city Beijing but instead took place at the Olympic Equestrian Centre in Hong Kong. Dunham at the age of 59, competing on her horse Teddy Edwards, won her first individual Paralympic gold medal in the championship test grade Ia and also won silver in the freestyle test grade Ia. In the team open Dunham, with teammates Lee Pearson, Sophie Christiansen and Simon Laurens won the gold medal. This meant that Dunham won a gold medal in this event at four consecutive Games.

== Personal life and death ==
Dunham was born in Tyne and Wear and had one daughter. She later lived in Broad Hinton, Wiltshire, and died on 11 May 2025, at the age of 76.

== Honours ==
In the 2009 New Year Honours, Dunham was appointed Member of the Order of the British Empire (MBE) for services to disabled sport. She was appointed Officer of the Order of the British Empire (OBE) in the 2017 New Year Honours for services to para-equestrianism.

== See also ==
- Equestrian at the 1996 Summer Paralympics
- Equestrian at the 2000 Summer Paralympics
- Equestrian at the 2004 Summer Paralympics
- Equestrian at the 2008 Summer Paralympics
- Great Britain at the 2008 Summer Paralympics
