= Singapore at the 1988 Summer Paralympics =

- IPC code: SIN
- NPC: Singapore Disability Sports Council

in Seoul
- Competitors: 8 in 2 sports
- Medals: Gold 0 Silver 0 Bronze 0 Total 0

Summer Paralympics appearances (overview)
- 1988; 1992; 1996; 2000; 2004; 2008; 2012; 2016; 2020; 2024

Singapore competed at the 1988 Summer Paralympics in Seoul, South Korea. Eight competitors from Singapore competed in a total of two sports (athletics and swimming), and did not place in the medal table.

== Disability classifications ==
Every participant at the Paralympics has their disability grouped into one of five disability categories; amputation, the condition may be congenital or sustained through injury or illness; cerebral palsy; wheelchair athletes, there is often overlap between this and other categories; visual impairment, including blindness; Les autres, any physical disability that does not fall strictly under one of the other categories, for example dwarfism or multiple sclerosis. Each Paralympic sport then has its own classifications, dependent upon the specific physical demands of competition. Events are given a code, made of numbers and letters, describing the type of event and classification of the athletes competing. Some sports, such as athletics, divide athletes by both the category and severity of their disabilities, other sports, for example swimming, group competitors from different categories together, the only separation being based on the severity of the disability.

== Athletics ==
Name	Event and disability code	Round reached	Position	Result
Ng Hoe Chye	Men's 200m 5-6	First round heats		36.98 secs
Ng Hoe Chye	Men's 400m 5-6	First round heats		1:16.04 mins
Ong Bah Lee	Women's 200m 3	First round heats		44.26 secs
Ong Bah Lee	Women's 400m 3	Finals	8th	1:30.63 mins
Ong Bah Lee	Women's 800m 3	Finals	6th	3:14.86 mins
Raja Singh	Men's 200m 2	First round heats		36.82 secs
Raja Singh	Men's 800m 2	First round heats		2:30.06 mins
Raja Singh	Men's 1500m 2	Semifinal heats		4:43.22 mins
Raja Singh	Men's marathon 2	Finals	18th	2:20:43 hrs
Thanapal Sinniah	Men's discus throw 5	Finals	8th	24.40 metres
Thanapal Sinniah	Men's marathon 5-6	Finals	17th	3:33:56 hrs
Tan Kian Meng William	Men's 400m 4	Semifinal heats		1:10.29 mins
Tan Kian Meng William	Men's 800m 4	First round heats		2:20.49 mins
Tan Kian Meng William	Men's 1500m 4	Semifinal heats		4:38.22 mins
Tan Kian Meng William	Men's 5000m 4	Semifinal heats		16:27.66 mins
Tan Kian Meng William	Men's marathon 4	Finals	14th	2:13:42 hrs
Tang See Chong	Men's 200m 3	Semifinal heats		35.57 secs
Tang See Chong	Men's 400m 3	Semifinal heats		1:08.34 mins
Tang See Chong	Men's 800m 3	First round heats		2:37.73 mins
Tang See Chong	Men's marathon 3	Finals	9th	2:07:38 hrs
Derek Yzelman	Men's 100m 5-6	Finals	7th	17.49 secs
Derek Yzelman	Men's 400m 5-6	Semifinal heats		1:07.67 mins
Derek Yzelman	Men's 800m 5-6	First round heats		2:17.96 mins
Derek Yzelman	Men's 1500m 5-6	First round heats		4:26.34 mins
Derek Yzelman	Men's marathon 5-6	Finals	13th	2:21:15 hrs

== Swimming ==
Name	Event and disability code	Round reached	Position	Result
Thanapal Sinniah	Men's 100m freestyle 5	First round heats		1:35.32 mins
Yong Phen Chong	Men's 50m breaststroke B1	First round heats		47.21 secs
Yong Phen Chong	Men's 100m breaststroke B1	First round heats		1:47.15 mins
Yong Phen Chong	Men's 100m butterfly B1	Finals	8th	1:59.15 mins

== See also ==
- Singapore at the Paralympics
- Singapore at the 1988 Summer Olympics
