= Swimming at the 2016 Summer Paralympics – Women's 50 metre backstroke S2 =

Women's 50 metre backstroke S2 at the XV Paralympic Games
- Venue: Olympic Aquatics Stadium
- Dates: 15 September 2016
- Competitors: 7 from 7 nations
- Winning time: 1:00.33

Medalists
1st place, gold medalist(s)		Pin Xiu Yip	Singapore
2nd place, silver medalist(s)		Yazhu Feng	China
3rd place, bronze medalist(s)		Iryna Sotska	Ukraine

The women's 50 metre backstroke S2 event at the 2016 Paralympic Games took place on 15 September 2016, at the Olympic Aquatics Stadium.

== Final ==
19:52 15 September 2016:

Rank	Lane	Name	Nationality	Time	Notes
1st place, gold medalist(s)	4	Pin Xiu Yip	Singapore	1:00.33	
2nd place, silver medalist(s)	5	Yazhu Feng	China	1:02.66	
3rd place, bronze medalist(s)	3	Iryna Sotska	Ukraine	1:17.22	
4	6	Gloria Boccanera	Italy	1:22.80	
5	7	Maria Kalpakidou	Greece	1:24.45	
6	1	Zsanett Adami	Hungary	1:25.97	
7	2	Cassie Mitchell	United States	1:28.19	
