= Swimming at the 2016 Summer Paralympics – Women's 100 metre backstroke S2 =

Women's 100 metre backstroke S2 at the XV Paralympic Games
- Venue: Olympic Aquatics Stadium
- Date: 9 September 2016
- Competitors: 6 from 6 nations

Medalists
1st place, gold medalist(s)		Yip Pin Xiu	Singapore
2nd place, silver medalist(s)		Feng Yazhu	China
3rd place, bronze medalist(s)		Iryna Sotska	Ukraine

The women's 100 metre backstroke S2 event at the 2016 Paralympic Games took place on 9 September 2016, at the Olympic Aquatics Stadium. No heats were held.

== Final ==
17:49 9 September 2016:

Rank	Lane	Name	Nationality	Time	Notes
1st place, gold medalist(s)	4	Pin Xiu Yip	Singapore	2:07.09	WR
2nd place, silver medalist(s)	3	Yazhu Feng	China	2:18.65	
3rd place, bronze medalist(s)	5	Iryna Sotska	Ukraine	2:21.98	
4	6	Zsanett Adami	Hungary	3:00.71	
5	2	Maria Kalpakidou	Greece	3:00.72	
6	7	Gloria Boccanera	Italy	3:18.38	
