= Helen Kearney =

Irish Paralympic equestrian

Personal information
- Nationality: Irish
- Born: 6 June 1989 (age 37)
- Home town: Dunlavin, County Wicklow
- Education: University College Dublin
Medal record
Representing Ireland
Paralympic Games
Equestrian
Silver medal – second place	2012 London	Individual championship test grade Ia
Bronze medal – third place	2012 London	Individual freestyle test grade Ia
Bronze medal – third place	2012 London	Team

Helen Kearney (born 6 June 1989) is an Irish Paralympic equestrian. She won three medals in the 2012 Summer Paralympics and also competed in the 2016 Summer Paralympics.

== Early life and education ==
Helen Kearney was born to Michael and Dr Mary Kearney on 6 June 1989, and grew up in Dunlavin, County Wicklow. She was educated at Newbridge College. When she was 10 years old, her parents enrolled her and her sister in horse riding lessons.

Kearney was diagnosed with scoliosis when she was 11 years old. In 2002, she was diagnosed with Friedreich's ataxia during an operation for scoliosis.

== Career ==
Kearney began competed in Grade III in 2008 before being reclassified as 1A. In this classification, she won Ireland's first European para-equestrian medal with a bronze. Kearney subsequently became the first member of Para Equestrian Ireland to earn a medal in the 2011 European Championships.

As a student at the University College Dublin, she qualified for the 2012 Summer Paralympics and earned three medals. Kearney earned a silver medal in the Individual championship test grade Ia and a bronze medal in the team event. Her last medal came in the Individual freestyle test grade Ia where she won bronze.

In 2016, Kearney was again selected to compete with Team Ireland at the 2016 Summer Paralympics. During the Grade 1a Individual Championship, she finished in 12th place.

Kearney announced her retirement in 2024, at the age of 35.
