= Equestrian events at the 2012 Summer Paralympics =

Equestrian at the XIV Paralympic Games
- Venue: Greenwich Park
- Dates: 30 August – 4 September 2012
- Competitors: 78 from 27 nations

Equestrian events at the 2012 Summer Paralympics consisted of 11 dressage events. The competitions was held in the Greenwich Park from 30 August to 4 September.

== Classification ==
Riders were given a classification depending on the type and extent of their disability. The classification system allowed riders to compete against others with a similar level of function.

Equestrian classes were:

- I, for riders with impaired limb function, or poor balance and good upper limb function
- II, for riders with locomotion impairment
- III, for blind riders with moderate locomotion impairment
- IV, for riders with some visual impairment or impaired function in one or two limbs

== Events ==
For each of the events below, medals were contested for one or more of the above classifications. After each classification are given the dates that the event was contested. All events were mixed, meaning that men and women competed together.

- Mixed individual championship
  - Grade Ia
  - Grade Ib
  - Grade II
  - Grade III
  - Grade IV
- Mixed individual freestyle
  - Grade Ia
  - Grade Ib
  - Grade II
  - Grade III
  - Grade IV
- Mixed team

== Officials ==
Appointment of officials is as follows:

Dressage

- (Norway) Kjell Myhre (Ground Jury President)
- (Argentina) Liliana Iannone (Ground Jury Member)
- (France) Anne Prain (Ground Jury Member)
- (United Kingdom) Sarah Rodger (Ground Jury Member)
- (Belgium) Freddy Leyman (Ground Jury Member)
- (Germany) Gudrun Hofinga (Ground Jury Member)
- (Portugal) Carlos Lopes (Ground Jury Member)

== Participating nations ==
78 riders from 27 nations competed.

- Argentina (1)
- Australia (4)
- Austria (2)
- Belgium (4)
- Brazil (4)
- Canada (4)
- Denmark (5)
- Finland (2)
- France (4)
- Germany (5)
- Great Britain (5)
- Hong Kong (1)
- Ireland (4)
- Israel (1)
- Italy (4)
- Japan (1)
- Latvia (1)
- Mexico (3)
- Netherlands (4)
- New Zealand (2)
- Norway (3)
- Portugal (1)
- Singapore (3)
- South Africa (4)
- Sweden (1)
- United States (4)
- Virgin Islands (1)

== Medal table ==
Rank	Nation	Gold	Silver	Bronze	Total
1	Great Britain (GBR)	5	5	1	11
2	Germany (GER)	2	3	2	7
3	Belgium (BEL)	2	0	0	2
4	Austria (AUT)	1	0	1	2
5	Australia (AUS)	1	0	0	1
6	Ireland (IRL)	0	1	2	3
7	Singapore (SIN)	0	1	1	2
8	Finland (FIN)	0	1	0	1
9	Denmark (DEN)	0	0	2	2
9	Netherlands (NED)	0	0	2	2
Totals (10 entries)		11	11	11	33

== Medal summary ==
=== Medalists ===
Event	Gold	Silver	Bronze
Individual championship test grade Ia	Sophie Christiansen; Great Britain	Helen Kearney; Ireland	Laurentia Tan; Singapore
Individual championship test grade Ib	Joann Formosa; Australia	Lee Pearson; Great Britain	Pepo Puch; Austria
Individual championship test grade II	Natasha Baker; Great Britain	Britta Näpel; Germany	Angelika Trabert; Germany
Individual championship test grade III	Hannelore Brenner; Germany	Deborah Criddle; Great Britain	Annika Dalskov; Denmark
Individual championship test grade IV	Michèle George; Belgium	Sophie Wells; Great Britain	Frank Hosmar; Netherlands
Individual freestyle test grade Ia	Sophie Christiansen; Great Britain	Laurentia Tan; Singapore	Helen Kearney; Ireland
Individual freestyle test grade Ib	Pepo Puch; Austria	Katja Karjalainen; Finland	Lee Pearson; Great Britain
Individual freestyle test grade II	Natasha Baker; Great Britain	Britta Näpel; Germany	Angelika Trabert; Germany
Individual freestyle test grade III	Hannelore Brenner; Germany	Deborah Criddle; Great Britain	Annika Dalskov; Denmark
Individual freestyle test grade IV	Michèle George; Belgium	Sophie Wells; Great Britain	Frank Hosmar; Netherlands
Team	Great Britain (GBR); Lee Pearson; Sophie Wells; Deborah Criddle; Sophie Christiansen	Germany (GER); Angelika Trabert; Britta Näpel; Steffen Zeibig; Hannelore Brenner	Ireland (IRL); Eilish Byrne; James Dwyer; Geraldine Savage; Helen Kearney
