= Equestrian events at the 2008 Summer Paralympics =

Equestrian at the XIII Paralympic Games
- Paralympic Equestrian
- Venue: Hong Kong Olympic Equestrian Centre
- Dates: 7–11 September 2008

Equestrian events at the 2008 Summer Paralympics consisted of eleven dressage events. The competitions were held in the Hong Kong Olympic Equestrian Centre from 7 September to 11 September.

== Classification ==
Riders were given a classification depending on the type and extent of their disability. The classification system allows riders to compete against others with a similar level of function.

Equestrian classes were:

- I, for riders with impaired limb function, or poor balance and good upper limb function
- II, for riders with locomotion impairment
- III, for blind riders with moderate locomotion impairment
- IV, for riders with some visual impairment or impaired function in one or two limbs

== Events ==
For each of the events below, medals were contested for one or more of the above classifications. After each classification are given the dates that the event was contested. All events were mixed, meaning that men and women competed together.

- Mixed individual championship
  - Grade Ia
  - Grade Ib
  - Grade II
  - Grade III
  - Grade IV
- Mixed individual freestyle
  - Grade Ia
  - Grade Ib
  - Grade II
  - Grade III
  - Grade IV
- Mixed team

== Officials ==
Appointment of officials is as follows:

Dressage

- (Netherlands) Hanneke Gerritsen (Ground Jury President)
- (Argentina) Liliana Iannone (Ground Jury Member)
- (France) Anne Prain (Ground Jury Member)
- (Finland) Tarja Huttunen (Ground Jury Member)
- (Australia) Janet Geary (Ground Jury Member)
- (Germany) Gudrun Hofinga (Ground Jury Member)
- (Norway) Kjell Myhre (Ground Jury Member)
- (Republic of Ireland) Alison Mastin (Ground Jury Member)

== Qualification ==
There were 73 athletes from 28 nations taking part in this sport.

- Australia (5)
- Austria (1)
- Belgium (2)
- Bermuda (1)
- Brazil (4)
- Canada (5)
- China (1)
- Croatia (2)
- Denmark (4)
- Finland (1)
- France (2)
- Germany (5)
- Great Britain (7)
- Hong Kong (1)
- Ireland (1)
- Israel (1)
- Italy (3)
- Japan (1)
- Netherlands (4)
- Norway (5)
- Poland (1)
- Portugal (1)
- Russia (1)
- Singapore (1)
- Slovakia (1)
- South Africa (4)
- Sweden (3)
- United States (5)

== Medal summary ==
=== Medal table ===
This ranking sorts countries by the number of gold medals earned by their riders (in this context a country is an entity represented by a National Paralympic Committee). The number of silver medals is taken into consideration next and then the number of bronze medals. If, after the above, countries are still tied, equal ranking is given and they are listed alphabetically.

Rank	Nation	Gold	Silver	Bronze	Total
1	Great Britain (GBR)	5	5	0	10
2	Germany (GER)	3	1	2	6
3	South Africa (RSA)	2	0	0	2
4	Canada (CAN)	1	1	0	2
5	Norway (NOR)	0	3	1	4
6	Denmark (DEN)	0	1	2	3
7	Australia (AUS)	0	0	2	2
7	Brazil (BRA)	0	0	2	2
7	Singapore (SIN)	0	0	2	2
Totals (9 entries)		11	11	11	33

=== Medalists ===
Laurentia Tan of Singapore won her country's first Paralympic medals, two bronzes, in the individual championship and freestyle grade Ia events.

Event	Gold	Silver	Bronze
Individual championship test grade Ia	Anne Dunham on Teddy; Great Britain	Sophie Christiansen on Lambrusco III; Great Britain	Laurentia Tan on Nothing To Lose; Singapore
Individual championship test grade Ib	Lee Pearson on Gentlemen; Great Britain	Jens Lasse Dokkan on Lacour; Norway	Marcos Alves on Luthenay De Varnay; Brazil
Individual championship test grade II	Britta Naepel on Cherubin 15; Germany	Lauren Barwick on Maile; Canada	Caroline Cecile Nielsen on Rostorn's Hatim-Tinn; Denmark
Individual championship test grade III	Hannelore Brenner on Women Of The World; Germany	Annika Lykke Dalskov on Alfarvad April Z Denmark	Bettina Eistel on Fabuleux 5 Germany
Individual championship test grade IV	Philippa Johnson on Benedict; South Africa	Ann Cathrin Lubbe on Zanko; Norway	Georgia Bruce on V Salute; Australia
Individual freestyle test grade Ia	Sophie Christiansen on Lambrusco III; Great Britain	Anne Dunham on Teddy; Great Britain	Laurentia Tan on Nothing To Lose; Singapore
Individual freestyle test grade Ib	Lee Pearson on Gentlemen; Great Britain	Ricky Balshaw on Deacons Giorgi; Great Britain	Marcos Alves on Luthenay De Varnay; Brazil
Individual freestyle test grade II	Lauren Barwick on Maile; Canada	Felicity Coulthard on Roffelaar; Great Britain	Britta Naepel on Cherubin 15; Germany
Individual freestyle test grade III	Hannelore Brenner on Women Of The World; Germany	Simon Laurens on Ocean Diamond; Great Britain	Annika Lykke Dalskov on Alfarvad April Z Denmark
Individual freestyle test grade IV	Philippa Johnson on Benedict; South Africa	Ann Cathrin Lubbe on Zanko; Norway	Georgia Bruce on V Salute; Australia
Mixed team	Great Britain (GBR); Sophie Christiansen on Lambrusco III; Anne Dunham on Teddy; Lee Pearson on Gentlemen; Simon Laurens on Ocean Diamond	Germany (GER); Britta Naepel on Cherubin 15; Angelika Trabert on Londria 2 Steffen Zeibig on Waldemar 27; Hannelore Brenner on Women Of The World	Norway (NOR); Jens Lasse Dokkan on Lacour; Mariette Garborg on Luthar; Ann Cathrin Lubbe on Zanko; Sigrid Rui on Nanof

== See also ==
- Equestrian events at the 2008 Summer Olympics
