= Lee Pearson =

British Paralympic equestrian

Sir Lee Pearson CBE
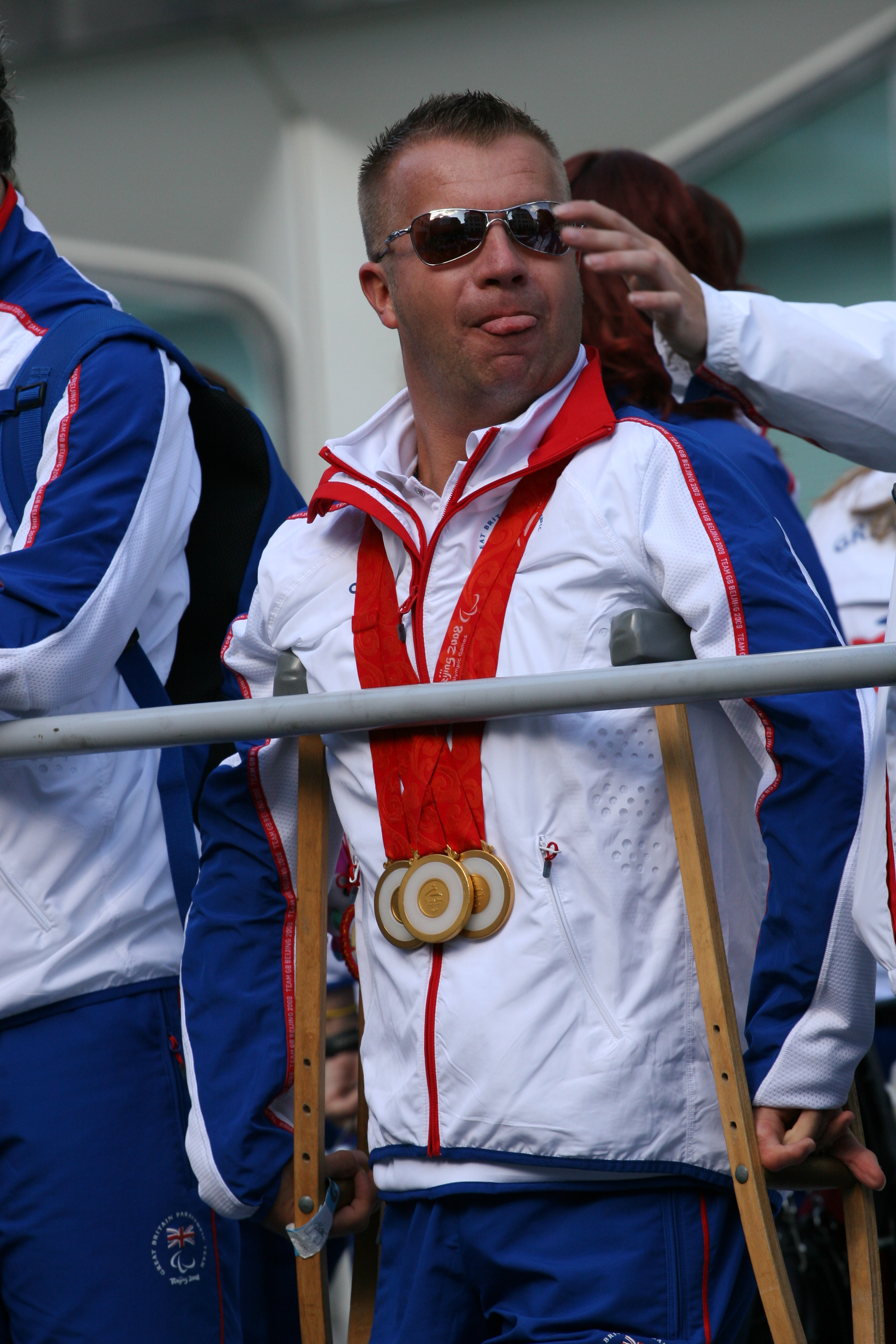
- Pearson in 2008

Personal information
- Full name: David Lee Pearson
- Discipline: Para-dressage
- Born: 4 February 1974 (age 52); Cheddleton, England
- Horses: Gentleman; Zion; B. Grandeur; Styletta; Roughcote Jupiter; Breezer
Medal record
Para-equestrian
Representing Great Britain
Event / 1st / 2nd / 3rd; Paralympic Games / 14 / 2 / 1
Paralympic Games
Gold medal – first place	2000 Sydney	Mixed dressage championship grade I
Gold medal – first place	2000 Sydney	Mixed dressage freestyle grade I
Gold medal – first place	2000 Sydney	Mixed dressage team open
Gold medal – first place	2004 Athens	Individual championship test grade I
Gold medal – first place	2004 Athens	Individual freestyle test grade I
Gold medal – first place	2004 Athens	Team
Gold medal – first place	2008 Beijing	Individual championship test grade Ib
Gold medal – first place	2008 Beijing	Individual freestyle test grade Ib
Gold medal – first place	2008 Beijing	Team
Gold medal – first place	2012 London	Team
Gold medal – first place	2016 Rio	Individual freestyle test grade Ib
Gold medal – first place	2020 Tokyo	Individual championship test grade II
Gold medal – first place	2020 Tokyo	Individual freestyle test grade II
Gold medal – first place	2020 Tokyo	Team
Silver medal – second place	2012 London	Individual championship test grade Ib
Silver medal – second place	2016 Rio	Individual championship test grade Ib
Bronze medal – third place	2012 London	Individual freestyle test grade Ib

Sir David Lee Pearson (born 4 February 1974) is a 14-times Paralympic Games gold medallist, having represented British para-equestrianism in Sydney, Athens, Beijing, London, Rio, and Tokyo. Over the course of his career he has won 30 gold medals at European, World and Paralympic level. Largely due to his impressive career and medal haul, he is known as the "Godfather" of para-dressage.

== Biography ==
Lee Pearson was born in Cheddleton, England, with arthrogryposis multiplex congenita and first came to public attention in 1980, when British Prime Minister Margaret Thatcher carried him up stairs in 10 Downing Street having awarded him a "Children of Courage" medal.

Pearson turned professional after he was inspired by the Atlanta Olympics. He won three gold medals in the championship dressage, freestyle dressage, and team dressage events at the 2000, 2004 and 2008 Summer Paralympics. With his horse Gentleman, he won gold in the team dressage event at the 2012 Summer Paralympics, silver in the championship dressage and bronze in the freestyle.

He noted after his failure to win gold in the freestyle competition in London that he had been voted down by the British judge, but said that he would compete at the 2016 Summer Paralympics in Rio, on a different horse named Zion.

He and his home-bred horse Breezer won three gold medals at the 2020 Summer Paralympics in Tokyo.

== Competition record ==
Competition	Venue	Gold	Silver	Bronze	Total
1999 World Championships	Denmark	3	0	0	3
2000 Paralympic Games	(Australia) Sydney	3	0	0	3
2002 European Championships	Portugal	3	0	0	3
2003 World Championships	Belgium	2	0	0	2
2004 Paralympic Games	(Greece) Athens	3	0	0	3
2005 European Championships	Hungary	1	2	0	3
2007 World Championships	(United Kingdom) Hartpury	3	0	0	3
2008 Paralympic Games	(China) Beijing	3	0	0	3
2010 FEI World Equestrian Games	(United States) Lexington	3	0	0	3
2012 Paralympic Games	(United Kingdom) London	1	1	1	3
2014 FEI World Equestrian Games	(France) Caen	3	0	0	3
2015 European Championships	(France) Deauville	1	2	0	3
2016 Paralympic Games	(Brazil) Rio de Janeiro	1	1	0	2
2018 FEI World Equestrian Games	(United States) Tryon	0	1	0	1
2020 Paralympic Games	(Japan) Tokyo	3	0	0	3
2022 FEI World Championships	(Denmark) Herning	0	1	1	2
Paralympics total		14	2	1	17
World Championship total		14	2	1	17
European Championships total		5	4	0	9
Overall total		33	8	2	43

== Honours ==
Pearson was awarded an honorary Doctorate from Staffordshire University in July 2005.

He was appointed Member of the Order of the British Empire (MBE) in the 2001 New Year Honours for services to disabled sports, Officer of the Order of the British Empire (OBE) in the 2005 New Year Honours for services to equestrianism and to disabled sport, and Commander of the Order of the British Empire (CBE) in the 2009 New Year Honours for services to equestrianism and to disabled sport. He was knighted in the 2017 New Year Honours for services to equestrianism.

== Personal life ==
Lee Pearson runs his own dressage yard in Staffordshire and teaches many around the country. Pearson was the first openly gay member of the British team and is an advocate for LGBTQ+ rights. In 2020, he became a single foster parent to a 15-year-old foster son.

== Selected works ==
Lee Pearson and Andrew Richardson, I am who I am, Worcester, 2021. ISBN 978-1910469347

== See also ==
- 2012 Paralympics gold post boxes
- Boaz Kramer (born 1978), Israeli Paralympic medalist wheelchair tennis player born with arthrogryposis
