= Laurentia Tan =

Singaporean Paralympic equestrienne, born 1979

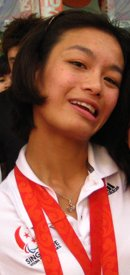
- Tan at a Paralympics celebration ceremony at Cathay Cineleisure Orchard on 20 September 2008

Personal information
- Full name: Laurentia Tan Yen Yi
- Nationality: Singaporean
- Born: 24 April 1979 (age 47) Singapore

Sport
- Country: Singapore
- Sport: Equestrianism
- Event: Dressage

Achievements and titles
- Paralympic finals: 2008 Summer Paralympics: Individual Championship Test (Ia) – Bronze; Individual Freestyle Test (Ia) – Bronze; 2012 Summer Paralympics: Individual Championship Test (Ia) – Bronze; Individual Freestyle Test (Ia) – Silver
Medal record
Equestrian: Dressage
Representing Singapore
Paralympic Games
Silver medal – second place	2012 London	Ind. F'style Test - Grade Ia
Bronze medal – third place	2008 Beijing	Ind. C'ship Test - Grade Ia
Bronze medal – third place	2008 Beijing	Ind. F'style Test - Grade Ia
Bronze medal – third place	2012 London	Ind. C'ship Test - Grade Ia
World Equestrian Games
Bronze medal – third place	2014 Normandy	Individual Para-Dressage Championship test - Grade Ia
Silver medal – second place	2018 Mill Spring	Individual Championship - Grade I

Laurentia Tan Yen Yi BBM PBM (/lɒˈrɛnʃə/ lo-REN-shə; Chinese: 陈雁仪; pinyin: Chén Yànyí, pronounced [tʂə̌n jɛ̂n í]; born 24 April 1979), is a Singaporean para-equestrian competitor. Tan developed cerebral palsy and profound deafness after birth, and moved to the United Kingdom with her parents at the age of three. She took up horse riding aged five years as a form of physiotherapy. She subsequently completed her A-levels at the Mary Hare Grammar School, a residential special school for the deaf, and graduated with an honours degree from Oxford Brookes University in hospitality management and tourism.

In March 2007, the Riding for the Disabled Association Singapore (RDA) invited Tan to join the Singapore team for the World Para Dressage Championships at Hartpury College in Hartpury, Gloucester, in England in July that year. At this event, her first international competition, she did well enough to qualify for the 2008 Paralympic Games. In September 2008, at the Hong Kong Olympic Equestrian Centre at Sha Tin, she achieved bronze medals in the Individual Championship and Individual Freestyle Tests (class Ia). These were Singapore's first Paralympic medals and Asia's first equestrian medals at the Paralympic Games. Tan was conferred the Pingat Bakti Masyarakat (Public Service Medal) by the President of Singapore at a ceremony at the Istana Singapore on 20 September 2008.

On 2 September 2012, Tan won Singapore's first medal at the 2012 Summer Paralympics in London, a bronze in the dressage Individual Championship Test (class Ia). She followed this up with a silver medal in the Individual Freestyle Test (class Ia) on 4 September. For her achievements, Tan was conferred a Bintang (Public Service Star) by the president in November 2012.

Tan would also participate in the World Equestrian Games, and would receive a bronze medal in 2014 and a silver medal in 2018. She also participated in the 2020 Summer Paralympics, but would only achieve 5th place.

== Early years and education ==
Laurentia Tan was born on 24 April 1979 in Singapore. She moved with her family to London at the age of three years due to her father's work. Tan developed cerebral palsy and profound deafness after birth, and doctors informed her parents that she would probably not be able to walk. Her family decided to settle in the United Kingdom as they felt she would be better able to reach her full potential with the medical facilities and specialist educational support available there. When she was in school, she fell so often and sustained so many minor injuries that her teachers and the school nurse affectionately nicknamed her "Trouble". At five years she was unable to sit and walk properly, and took up horse riding at the Diamond Centre for Disabled Riders in London as a form of physiotherapy. This activity also helped her confidence and self-esteem.

Tan completed her A-levels at the Mary Hare Grammar School, a residential special school for the deaf, where she was a prefect. She also won an Elizabeth Dyson Prize for progress and achievement and a prize for business studies. From the age of 18, she stopped horse riding for eight years to pursue an honours degree in hospitality management and tourism at Oxford Brookes University, and for a job as a mental health worker. However, she missed the sport and took it up again in 2005. Tan said, "For me, riding a horse gives me the freedom, movement and energy that my own legs cannot do."

== Sporting career ==
Tan took up riding in October 2005 at the Diamond Centre for Disabled Riders, where she met her coach Heather "Penny" Pegrum. Encouraged to participate in dressage competitions in March 2006, she quickly progressed to the Riding for the Disabled Association (RDA) Nationals that year. In March 2007, RDA Singapore contacted Tan and invited her to join the Singapore team for the World Para Dressage Championships 2007, which was a qualifier for the 2008 Summer Paralympics. The event, Tan's first international competition, was held at Hartpury College, Gloucester, in England in July 2007. She achieved 63% or higher in both her Team and Individual Tests, qualifying her to be selected for the 2008 Summer Paralympics. In the Freestyle to Music Test, despite her profound deafness, she was placed fourth in a field of 18 riders with a best score of 67.94%. In October 2007, Tan went to Singapore for a visit and trained daily at Singapore's RDA with volunteer coach Sally Drummond. Tan resigned her job in June 2008 to train full-time with her coach Penny Pegrum and physiotherapist Anthea Pell.

=== 2008 Summer Paralympics ===
Tan's first Paralympic event was the para-dressage Individual Championship Test (class Ia). Riders in this event are categorized into classes I to IV, those in class I having the most severe disabilities. On 9 September, riding a 20-year-old chestnut gelding loaned to her named Nothing to Lose (also known as Harvey) at the Hong Kong Olympic Equestrian Centre in Sha Tin, Tan scored 68.80% to claim the bronze medal behind the United Kingdom's Anne Dunham (73.10%) and Sophie Christiansen (72.80%). She thus became the first Singaporean to win a Paralympic medal, and the holder of Asia's first Paralympic equestrian medal. Two days after achieving the first medal, Tan collected her second bronze with a score of 70.167% for the Individual Freestyle Event, in which she performed to music with Nothing To Lose. The president of the Equestrian Federation of Singapore, Melanie Chew, described her performance as "beyond our expectations", and that the wins would aid in promoting local awareness of the sport.

Tan's win sparked discussion about the recognition given to Paralympians in Singapore. A correspondent to the Straits Times criticized the fact that the newspaper had not elaborated on Tan's performance or what was involved in the event, but had "focused almost primarily on her disability". Another letter writer to my paper expressed disappointment that less publicity had been given to Tan's achievement compared to the silver medals won by the Singapore women's table tennis team at the 2008 Summer Olympics. In addition, a Today reader noted that Tan would be receiving S$25,000 for her bronze medal, a tenth of the S$250,000 that table tennis players Feng Tianwei, Li Jiawei and Wang Yuegu received for their silver medals. He felt that she should receive even more than them, given what she had achieved in spite of her disabilities. The president of the Society for the Physically Disabled, Chia Yong Yong, commented that the disparity between the cash awards given to able-bodied and disabled sportspeople was "disconcerting" and looked forward to a single common scheme, because:

If we persist in having two different standards, we reinforce the erroneous perception that disabled people are different, and strengthen the barriers against building an inclusive society. We cannot build a gracious inclusive society if we continue to deny the achievements of those perceived to be different and less able than we.

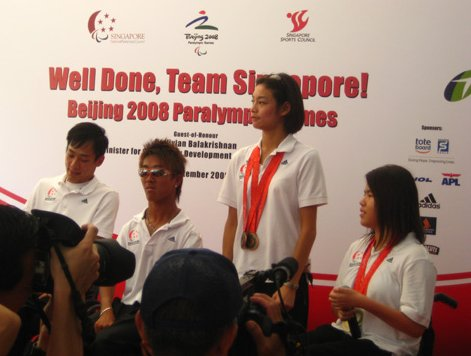
Singaporean Paralympians Eric Ting Chee Keong, Jovin Tan Wei Qiang, Tan and Yip Pin Xiu at a Paralympics Celebration Ceremony at Cathay Cineleisure Orchard on 20 September 2008

On 16 September, Nominated Member of Parliament Eunice Olsen asked in Parliament if there was a difference in the amount of funding given to Olympians and Paralympians, and why Paralympians receive a much smaller cash reward for medals won compared to Olympians. Teo Ser Luck, Senior Parliamentary Secretary (Community Development, Youth and Sports), said that on a per capita basis disabled sportspeople received about S$106,000 in the current financial year compared to S$54,000 for each able-bodied sportsperson as there were 794 registered able-bodied sportspeople but only 16 disabled ones. Teo attributed the disparity in the cash rewards to the fact that Olympians faced higher levels and a larger scale of competition, since disabled sportspeople compete within disability classes. Further, cash rewards were provided by the private sector and Singapore Totalisator Board and were not paid out of state funds. The scheme for Olympians had also been in place for a number of years, while cash rewards for Paralympians were only introduced recently. He said that the government was looking at how it could "develop a system to accommodate all athletes that represent Singapore".

Tan was conferred the Pingat Bakti Masyarakat (Public Service Medal) by the President of Singapore at a ceremony at the Istana Singapore on 20 September 2008. At an appreciation dinner on 21 November 2008, the Singapore National Paralympic Committee (SNPC) announced that it was increasing the monetary awards under its Athlete Achievement Award scheme for Paralympic Games medallists in individual and team events, a quarter of which would be paid to the SNPC towards developing elite athletes and sports. As a result, for her Paralympic win, Tan received a cash reward of S$37,500, S$12,500 of which went to the SNPC. She made it into Today newspaper's list of athletes of the year for 2008 in eighth place, and shared the Her World Young Woman Achiever 2008 award with Paralympian swimmer Yip Pin Xiu.

=== 2012 Summer Paralympics ===
On 2 September 2012, Tan won Singapore's first medal at the 2012 Summer Paralympics, a bronze in the dressage Individual Championship Test (class Ia). Riding on Ruben James 2, a gelding from Germany she had only known for ten months, she scored 73.650 percentage points. Two days later, on 4 September, she scored 79.000 in the Individual Freestyle Test (class Ia) which brought her a silver medal. Her wins brought her prizes of $50,000 (for her bronze medal) and $100,000 (silver) from the SNPC's Athletes Achievement Awards scheme, again leading to comments about the stark difference between the cash prizes that Olympic and Paralympic medallists receive. Twenty per cent of the prize money will be paid to the Singapore National Paralympic Council for training and development. For her achievements, Tan won The Straits Times newspaper's Star of the Month for September, and was conferred a Bintang Bakti Masyarakat (Public Service Star) by the president on 11 November 2012.

=== 2014 World Equestrian Games ===
On 26 August 2014, Tan scored 74.552 percentage points at the 2014 World Equestrian Games (WEG), on her horse, Ruben James 2. Tan went on to win a bronze medal with her horse, Ruben Delight, and she scored around 75.087 percentage points.

=== 2018 World Equestrian Games ===
On 20 September 2018, Tan won a silver medal in the Individual Championship grade I of the Federation Equestre Internationale (FEI) at the 2018 World Equestrian Games, with her horse Fuerst Sherlock. She would score around 73.750 percentage points.

=== 2020 Summer Paralympics ===
On 27 August 2021, Tan took 5th place in the dressage Individual Championship Test at the 2020 Summer Paralympics, with her horse, Banestro. She scored 73.964 percentage points. She would go on to participate on the dressage Individual Freestyle Test at the Tokyo Equestrian Park on 30 August 2021, also getting 5th place and scoring around 75.060 percentage points.

=== 2022 World Para Dressage Championships ===
On 10 August 2022, Tan took 4th place in the 2022 World Para Dressage Championships Individual Test (Grade Ia), on her horse, Hickstead. She scored around 73.678 percentage points. She would go on to also take 5th place in the Team Championship Test, scoring 73.429 percentage points.

== Medals ==
Event	Score (%)	Medal	Date	Competition
2008
Individual Championship Test (class Ia)	68.800	Bronze	9 September 2008	2008 Summer Paralympics; Hong Kong, People's Republic of China
Individual Freestyle Test (class Ia)	70.167	Bronze	11 September 2008	2008 Summer Paralympics; Hong Kong, People's Republic of China
2012
Individual Championship Test (class Ia)	73.650	Bronze	2 September 2012	2012 Summer Paralympics; London, United Kingdom
Individual Freestyle Test (class Ia)	79.000	Silver	4 September 2012	2012 Summer Paralympics; London, United Kingdom
2014
Individual Para-Dressage Championship test (Grade Ia)	75.087	Bronze	28 August 2014	2014 FEI World Equestrian Games Normandy, France
2018
Individual Championship (Grade I)	73.750	Silver	20 September 2018	2018 FEI World Equestrian Games Mill Spring, North Carolina
