= Sophie Christiansen =

British Paralympic equestrian

Sophie Christiansen CBE
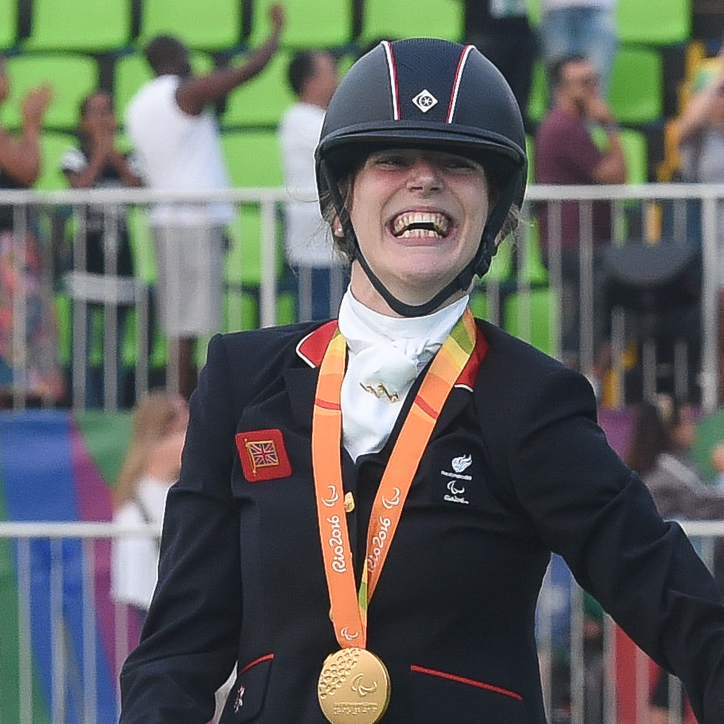
- One of three golds at Rio in 2016

Personal information
- Born: Sophie Margaret Christiansen; 14 November 1987 (age 38) Ascot, Bracknell Forest, Berkshire, England

Sport
- Country: Great Britain
- Sport: Para equestrian

Achievements and titles
- Paralympic finals: 2004, 2008, 2012, 2016
- Highest world ranking: 1
- Personal best: 84.75%
Medal record
Para equestrian
Representing Great Britain
Paralympic Games
| Gold medal – first place | 2008 Beijing | Freestyle test grade Ia |
| Gold medal – first place | 2008 Beijing | Team open |
| Gold medal – first place | 2012 London | Freestyle test grade Ia |
| Gold medal – first place | 2012 London | Championship test grade Ia |
| Gold medal – first place | 2012 London | Team championship |
| Gold medal – first place | 2016 Rio | Freestyle test grade Ia |
| Gold medal – first place | 2016 Rio | Championship test grade Ia |
| Gold medal – first place | 2016 Rio | Team championship |
| Silver medal – second place | 2008 Beijing | Championship test grade Ia |
| Bronze medal – third place | 2004 Athens | Championship test grade I |

Sophie Margaret Christiansen (born 14 November 1987) is an English former equestrian who competed in four successive Paralympic Games. In 2012 and 2016 she gained three gold medals at the Paralympics. In 2008 she won two gold medals and a silver at the Beijing Paralympics whilst studying for a master's degree in mathematics at Royal Holloway, University of London. She works as a software developer at investment bank Goldman Sachs and as a disability campaigner. She qualified for the postponed 2020 Summer Paralympics but had to drop out due to her horse not being fit.

== Early life ==
Christiansen was born two months prematurely with cerebral palsy and suffered from other health problems including jaundice, blood poisoning, a heart attack and a collapsed lung. At the age of six she began horse riding as a form of physiotherapy at her local Riding for the Disabled Association (RDA) group.

== Competition ==
In 2016, Christiansen gained three gold medals at the Paralympics in Rio on Athene Lindebjerg. She contested the freestyle, scoring 79.7%, and individual championship dressage grade I, the classification grade for severely disabled athletes, and was part of the gold medal-winning team competition, along with Natasha Baker, Anne Dunham and Sophie Wells.

London 2012 also saw her win three gold medals at the home Games, in the grade 1 individual championship, freestyle and team competition on her horse Janeiro 6. Christiansen contested the team gold medal with teammates Debbie Criddle, Lee Pearson and Sophie Wells. Christiansen won gold in the freestyle with a personal best score of 84.75% finishing 5.75% ahead of her closest rival." She was Britain's first triple gold medallist at the London Paralympic Games. In honour of her achievements at the London 2012 Games, the Royal Mail painted a postbox gold for each of her gold medals in her original hometown of Sunningdale, on the campus of her University and in her hometown at the time of Maidenhead. Her horse Janeiro 6 also got a postbox painted gold in Fulmer, Buckinghamshire, near where she trained at South Bucks RDA.

In 2008, Christiansen represented Great Britain at the Summer Paralympics. The equestrian events were not held in the host city Beijing but instead took place at the Olympic Equestrian Centre in Hong Kong. Competing in her second Games, she again contested the freestyle and individual championship dressage events at grade 1 and was part of the British quartet in the team dressage. Riding Lambrusco III, she won an individual gold medal in the freestyle and silver in the championship dressage. In the team open Christiansen, with teammates Lee Pearson, Anne Dunham and Simon Laurens won her second Paralympic gold medal.

She first competed at the Paralympics aged 16 and was the youngest athlete for Great Britain at the 2004 Summer Paralympics. In the freestyle event Christiansen finished fourth. The championship grade I dressage saw Christiansen win her first Paralympic medal. Competing with Hotstuff, owned by her teammate Nicola Tustain, she took bronze.

Christiansen has often spoken about how the Paralympics changed her life as a teenager. At school she was highly self-conscious about her disability, especially her speech. But seeing so many disabled people at once, just getting on with their lives and joking about it at the same time, made her want to be seen in this positive light as well.

Christiansen has won numerous medals at World and European Championships, including three golds at the 2015 European Championships in France, two golds and a silver at the 2014 World Equestrian Games in France, three golds at the 2013 European Championships in Denmark, two golds and a silver at the 2010 World Equestrian Games in the US, two golds and a silver at the 2009 European Championships in Norway, a gold and a bronze at the 2007 World Championships in the UK and three golds at the 2005 European Championships in Hungary.

She qualified for the postponed 2020 Summer Paralympics but had to drop out due to her horse, Innuendo III, not being fit. She would have joined the GB team of Paralympic gold medallists Sir Lee Pearson, Natasha Baker and Sophie Wells. Her place was taken by the European medallist Georgia Wilson who made her Paralympics debut.

After missing the 2024 Paris Paralympics, Christiansen announced her para-dressage retirement on 5 November 2024.

== Disability campaigner ==
Through her success, Christiansen is a visible role model. However this has not come easily and she feels it is important to talk about the societal barriers of living with a disability. In 2019 she started a petition to improve accessibility on the UK's railway network, due to being left stranded on a train in her wheelchair numerous times whilst commuting into London.

Supporting charities is also important for Christiansen, as a way of giving back to areas which have helped get her where she is today. She champions the following charities either as a Patron, Ambassador or Vice President: Riding for the Disabled Association, SportsAble, The Rainbow Centre, The Movement Centre, Mane Chance and Sparks.

Christiansen is a patron of the charity Chance for Childhood. In 2015, she visited their projects with disabled children in northern Rwanda.

Christiansen takes part in the Superhero Series twice a year on her recumbent trike to promote inclusive recreational sport and staying fit and healthy for people with a disability.

== Honours ==
Christiansen was named BBC London Disabled Athlete of the Year for 2004.

She was appointed Member of the Order of the British Empire (MBE) in the 2009 New Year Honours for services to disabled sport, promoted to Officer of the Order of the British Empire (OBE) in the 2013 New Year Honours for services to equestrianism, and further promoted to Commander of the Order of the British Empire (CBE) in the 2017 New Year Honours for services to para-equestrianism.

In 2015 Christiansen won a 'Women of the Future Award'. It was the first year that a sports category was included and the judges picked out Christiansen for her 'ferocious determination to succeed'.

In 2016, Royal Holloway Students' Union introduced the "Sophie Christiansen Shield" to their Sports Club Awards for a club that has "gone to great lengths to not only make their club as inclusive and as accessible as possible but have also educated their members as to why this is so important."

Christiansen was shortlisted for 2016 BBC Sports Personality of the Year, eventually being voted fifth out of sixteen contenders.

== Personal and professional life ==
Christiansen was educated at Charters School and Royal Holloway, University of London, where she attained a first class master's degree. She received an honorary fellowship from the college in May 2012.

Christiansen works as a software developer at investment bank Goldman Sachs. In an interview with City A.M. she talked about the benefits of having "something else to think about". She told The Times that working two days a week helped to "lessen the intensity" of competing at a high level in sport.

== See also ==
- 2012 Olympics gold post boxes in the United Kingdom
