= Equestrian events at the Summer Paralympics =

- Governing body: FEI
- Events: 11 (mixed)

Games
- 1960; 1964; 1968; 1972; 1976; 1980; 1984; 1988; 1992; 1996; 2000; 2004; 2008; 2012; 2016; 2020; 2024
- Medalists

Paralympic equestrian competition is a Para-equestrian event that consists of dressage. It has been part of the Summer Paralympic Games since 1996.

== Summary ==
Games	Year	Events	Best Nation
1			
2			
3			
4			
5			
6			
7	1984	12	United States
8			
9			
10	1996	9	Great Britain
11	2000	9	Great Britain
12	2004	9	Great Britain
13	2008	11	Great Britain
14	2012	11	Great Britain
15	2016	11	Great Britain
16	2020	11	Great Britain
17	2024	11	United States

== Medal summary ==
Updated to the 2024 Summer Paralympics, all medals are counted in all equestrian events in the Paralympic Games.

Rank	Nation	Gold	Silver	Bronze	Total
1	Great Britain (GBR)	34	21	16	71
2	United States (USA)	14	9	4	27
3	Denmark (DEN)	7	9	10	26
4	Belgium (BEL)	7	2	3	12
5	Germany (GER)	6	14	10	30
6	Netherlands (NED)	6	11	12	29
7	Norway (NOR)	5	9	6	20
8	Sweden (SWE)	4	1	3	8
9	Australia (AUS)	3	1	5	9
10	Austria (AUT)	2	3	1	6
11	Latvia (LAT)	2	2	0	4
11	South Africa (RSA)	2	2	0	4
13	Canada (CAN)	1	3	6	10
14	New Zealand (NZL)	1	1	0	2
15	Brazil (BRA)	0	1	4	5
16	Ireland (IRL)	0	1	3	4
16	Italy (ITA)	0	1	3	4
16	Singapore (SIN)	0	1	3	4
19	Finland (FIN)	0	1	1	2
19	France (FRA)	0	1	1	2
Totals (20 entries)		94	94	91	279

== Nations ==
Nation	60	64	68	72	76	80	84	88	92	96	00	04	08	12	16	20	Total
Argentina (ARG)												1		1	1		3
Australia (AUS)										5	7	4	5	4	4		6
Austria (AUT)											2	1	1	2	4		5
Belgium (BEL)											3	2	2	4	4		5
Bermuda (BER)										2	2	2	1				4
Brazil (BRA)												1	4	4	4		4
Canada (CAN)							3			4		4	5	4	4		6
China (CHN)													1				1
Croatia (CRO)											1	2	2				3
Czech Republic (CZE)															1		1
Denmark (DEN)							2			5	4	4	4	5	4		7
Finland (FIN)										2	2		1	2	1		5
France (FRA)										5	5	3	2	4	4		6
Germany (GER)										6	6	5	5	5	5		6
Great Britain (GBR)							1			6	7	7	7	5	5		7
Greece (GRE)												1					1
Hong Kong (HKG)													1	1	1		3
Hungary (HUN)												1					1
Ireland (IRL)										2	2	1	1	4	1		6
Israel (ISR)										4	1	3	1	1			5
Italy (ITA)										1	1	1	3	4	4		6
Japan (JPN)											3	1	1	1	1		5
Latvia (LAT)														1	1		2
Mexico (MEX)														3	1		2
Netherlands (NED)										3	4	3	4	4	5		6
New Zealand (NZL)										1	1	1		2			4
Norway (NOR)							1			4	5	5	5	3	4		7
Peru (PER)											1	1					2
Poland (POL)												1	1		1		3
Portugal (POR)												1	1	1	1		4
Russia (RUS)											1	2	1				3
Singapore (SGP)													1	3	3		3
Slovakia (SVK)													1		1		2
South Africa (RSA)											1	2	4	4	1		5
Spain (ESP)											1						1
Sweden (SWE)							2			5	5	4	3	1	2		7
Switzerland (SUI)												1			2		2
United States (USA)							6			6	6	4	5	4	5		7
Uruguay (URU)															1		1
Virgin Islands (ISV)														1			1
Zimbabwe (ZIM)											1						1
Nations							6			16	24	29	28	27	29		
Competitors							15			61	72	69	73	78	76		
Year	60	64	68	72	76	80	84	88	92	96	00	04	08	12	16	20	

== See also ==
- Equestrian events at the Summer Olympics
