= Yip Pin Xiu =

Singaporean Paralympic swimmer

Yip Pin Xiu PJG PLY
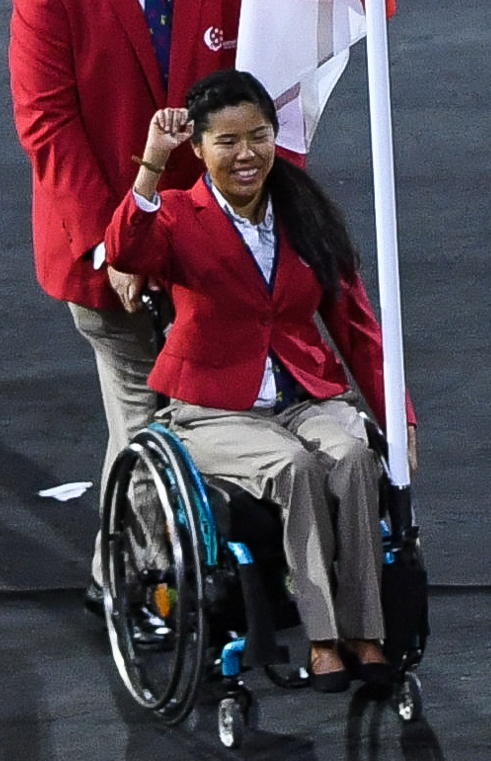
- Yip as the flag bearer for Singapore at the 2016 Summer Paralympics Parade of Nations

Personal information
- Full name: Yip Pin Xiu
- Born: 10 January 1992 (age 34) Singapore

Sport
- Sport: Swimming
- Strokes: Backstroke; Freestyle
- Classifications: S2
- Coach: Mick Massey
Medal record
Swimming
Representing Singapore
Event	1st	2nd	3rd
Paralympics	7	1	0
World Championships	8	3	0
Asian Para Games	1	0	2
Total	16	4	2
Paralympic Games
Gold medal – first place	2008 Beijing	50 m backstroke S3
Gold medal – first place	2016 Rio	50 m backstroke S2
Gold medal – first place	2016 Rio	100 m backstroke S2
Gold medal – first place	2020 Tokyo	50 m backstroke S2
Gold medal – first place	2020 Tokyo	100 m backstroke S2
Gold medal – first place	2024 Paris	50 m backstroke S2
Gold medal – first place	2024 Paris	100 m backstroke S2
Silver medal – second place	2008 Beijing	50 m freestyle S3
World Championships
Gold medal – first place	2010 Eindhoven	50 m freestyle S3
Gold medal – first place	2019 London	50 m backstroke S2
Gold medal – first place	2019 London	100 m backstroke S2
Gold medal – first place	2022 Madeira	50 m backstroke S2
Gold medal – first place	2022 Madeira	100 m backstroke S2
Gold medal – first place	2023 Manchester	50 m backstroke S2
Gold medal – first place	2023 Manchester	100 m backstroke S2
Gold medal – first place	2025 Singapore	50 m backstroke S2
Silver medal – second place	2010 Eindhoven	50 m backstroke S3
Silver medal – second place	2013 Montreal	50 m backstroke S3
Silver medal – second place	2025 Singapore	100 m backstroke S2
Asian Para Games
Gold medal – first place	2018 Jakarta	50 m backstroke S4
Bronze medal – third place	2018 Jakarta	50 m freestyle S4
Bronze medal – third place	2018 Jakarta	100 m freestyle S4

Yip Pin Xiu PJG PLY (Chinese: 叶品秀; pinyin: Yè Pǐnxìu; Jyutping: Jip6 Ban2 Sau3; born 10 January 1992) is a Singaporean backstroke para-swimmer. She is a seven-time Paralympic gold medalist and seven-time World Champion, with two world records in the Women's S2 50-metre and 100-metre backstrokes. Yip is Singapore's most decorated Paralympian and Southeast Asia's most decorated Paralympic swimmer.

Yip has Charcot-Marie-Tooth syndrome and competes in the S2 category for the physically impaired. Since 2005, she has won medals in international competitions such as the World Wheelchair and Amputee Games, Japan Paralympic Swimming Championships and International German Paralympic Swimming Championships. At the 2008 Summer Paralympics, she won a gold medal in the 50m backstroke and a silver medal in the 50m freestyle, setting world records in both events. At the 2016 Summer Paralympics, she won a gold medal in the 100m S2 backstroke, setting a world record for that event, and another for her 50m split. She retained her gold medals for these two events in 2020 and 2024 in a historic three-peat.

In 2009, Yip was named "Young Woman Achiever of the Year" by local magazine Her World. In honour of her feats at the Paralympic Games, she was conferred the Pingat Jasa Gemilang (Meritorious Service Medal) during the National Day Awards ceremony in 2016. More recently, Yip was crowned Sportswoman of the Year (swimming) at the Singapore Disability Sports Awards 2022. This was her third time earning this honour, having won the same award in 2019 and 2021. Her achievements have contributed to the widespread recognition of disabled athletes in the Singaporean public sphere.

== Early life and education ==
Yip Pin Xiu was born in Singapore on 10 January 1992, being the youngest of three children in her family.

At birth, Yip had Charcot–Marie–Tooth disease but her symptoms only appeared when she was two years old. Due to her aunt witnessing her unable to extend and rotate her ankles, her family brought her to a doctor and was initially diagnosed as muscular dystrophy. When Yip was five, she started swimming to improve her health and strengthen her muscles; nevertheless, by the age of thirteen, she had lost her ability to walk and had to use a wheelchair.

As a student, Yip first studied in Ai Tong Primary School at Bishan and Bendemeer Secondary School, before she graduated from Republic Polytechnic in Woodlands as back-up valedictorian and, as of 2017, Yip graduated from Singapore Management University in Bras Basah with a Bachelor of Social Science.

== Swimming career ==
=== Early years ===
Yip started swimming competitively when she was twelve years old. After losing her ability to kick, Yip switched from the front crawl to the backstroke and was reclassified from the S5 to the S2 category (lower numbers indicate more severe disabilities). Her previous coach was former Singaporean Olympic swimmer Ang Peng Siong, while fellow Paralympic swimmer Theresa Goh is her close friend and role model. Besides swimming, Yip has participated in events to raise awareness of disabled sports, such as the Interschool Swimming Meets and Sengkang Primary School Track and Field Meet 2007.

After successes in national championships, Yip participated in the Asia Paralympics Swimming Championship 2005, winning two gold medals. Her first international competition was the World Wheelchair and Amputee Games 2005, where she won two gold medals and a bronze. She then received four gold medals at the DSE Long Course Swimming Championships in 2006. In 2007, she won three gold medals at the Japan Paralympic Swimming Championships and four gold medals at the World Wheelchair and Amputee Games.

=== 2008 Asian Paralympics ===
At the 4th ASEAN Para Games, Yip finished first in the women's 150 metres individual medley, clocking 4 minutes 56.34 seconds. She set a world record time of 1 minute 00.80 seconds in the 50 metres backstroke at the US Paralympic swimming trials. The 22nd International German Paralympic Swimming Championships saw her set a world record of 2 minutes 10.09 seconds in the 100 metres backstroke heats; in the finals, she was awarded the gold medal with a time of 2 minutes 08.09 seconds, bettering her own world record.

=== 2008 Summer Paralympics ===
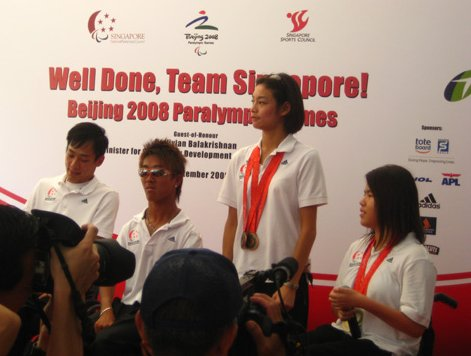
Yip with fellow Singaporean Paralympians after the 2008 games

Yip started her 2008 Summer Paralympic Games campaign by breaking another world record, clocking 57.04 seconds in the women's 50 metres freestyle heats. However, she was narrowly beaten by Mexican swimmer Patricia Valle in the finals, clinching a silver medal with a time of 57.43 seconds. In the women's 50 metres backstroke heats, she posted a time of 57.92 seconds, taking two seconds off her own world record. She then swam the women's 50 metres backstroke finals in a time of 58.75 seconds to win the gold medal. After she returned to Singapore, the president conferred Yip a state medal, the Meritorious Service Medal.

The success of Yip and Laurentia Tan, who won two bronze medals in equestrian events, sparked public debate about the treatment and recognition of disabled athletes in Singapore. Letters to The Straits Times criticised the poor coverage of the Paralympics. Many Singaporeans also commented about the disparity of the cash awards handed out by the government: In 2008, it was S$1,000,000 for an Olympic gold and S$100,000 for a Paralympic gold. When the issues were raised in Parliament, MCYS parliamentary secretary Teo Ser Luck promised to study plans to give disabled athletes greater support and to include them in sporting programmes such as Project 0812, a training programme for top Singaporean sportspeople. Two months later, the cash rewards for Paralympic medals were doubled to S$200,000 and funding for the Singapore National Paralympic Council (SNPC) was increased.

=== 2015 Asian Paralympics ===
At the 8th ASEAN Para Games in 2015, Yip was the torch lighter with Tay Wei Ming and Gan Kai Hong Aloysius.

=== 2016 Summer Paralympics ===
Yip participated in the 2016 Summer Paralympics. On 10 September 2016, Yip swam in the finals of the 100 m backstroke, S2 class; her time of 2:07.09 was a new S2 world record, earning her a Paralympic gold medal. Her 59.38 split for the first 50 m of the race was also a new S2 world record; in both cases she overwrote her own world leading times. Her medal was Singapore's first at the 2016 Summer Paralympics. On 16 September, Yip won her (and Singapore's) second gold medal of the 2016 Games, this time in the 50 m backstroke finals, S2 class with a time of 1:00.33.

=== 2018 Asian Paralympics ===
Yip also participated in the 2018 Asian Para Games, and won one gold medal and two bronze medals in total. On 8 October, she won her first gold medal for the 50 m backstroke, S1-4 class, and on 9 October, her first bronze medal for the 100 m freestyle, S1-4 class event. On 12 October, she won her second bronze medal on the 50 m freestyle, S1-4 class event with a time of 1:04.68, behind Peng Qiuping of China and Gabidullina Zulfiya of Kazakhstan, with times of 43.48s and 45.51s, respectively.

=== 2020 Summer Paralympics ===
Yip participated in the 2020 Tokyo Paralympics. She won two gold medals, the women's 100m backstroke S2 and the women's 50m backstroke S2. She subsequently received S$400,000 by the SNPC; S$200,000 for each gold medal. Her cash incentives was doubled to S$800,000 after she was sponsored by Singapore's DBS Bank and the Tote Board.

=== 2023 Para Swimming World Series ===
During the Para Swimming World Series Australia 2023, Yip clinched the gold medal in the Women's 100m backstroke multi-class event. She later also bagged her second gold medal in the Women's 50m backstroke on the final day of the competition.

=== 2024 Summer Paralympics ===
In 2022, the SNPC announced that the cash reward for a gold medal in the 2024 Paris Paralympics would be further increased to S$500,000. Yip participated in the Games and achieved a historic three-peat by winning the gold medal once more in the women's 100m backstroke S2 event.

== Political career ==
On 17 September 2018, Yip became a Nominated Member of Parliament (NMP). She was sworn into the Parliament of Singapore on 1 October 2018 and served until 23 June 2020, a term of approximately two years.

== Post-swimming career ==
As of 1 January 2022, Yip was serving on the Athlete Committee of the World Anti-Doping Agency.

She collaborated with Claudia Poh on Poh's "It Is Only In Water I Can Move Freely" fashion collection.

== Personal life ==
In February 2022, Yip was awarded the President's Award for Inspiring Achievement in recognition of her contributions to sports and community work.

Her coaches have included Ang Peng Siong, Mark Chay and Mick Massey.

== Honours ==
- Pingat Jasa Gemilang (Meritorious Service Medal)
- Honorary Doctor of Laws, Singapore Management University

=== Others ===
In February 2025, she became the first para-athlete to have a wax figure at Madame Tussauds Singapore.

== See also ==
- Singapore at the Paralympics
