= Netherlands at the 2008 Summer Paralympics =

- Flag of the Netherlands
- IPC code: NED
- NPC: Nederlands Olympisch Comité * Nederlandse Sport Federatie
- Website: paralympisch.nl (in Dutch)

in Beijing
- Competitors: 83 in 13 sports
- Flag bearers: Esther Vergeer (opening); Mirjam de Koning (closing)
- Medals Ranked 19th: Gold 5 Silver 10 Bronze 7 Total 22

Summer Paralympics appearances (overview)
- 1960; 1964; 1968; 1972; 1976; 1980; 1984; 1988; 1992; 1996; 2000; 2004; 2008; 2012; 2016; 2020; 2024

The Netherlands competed at the 2008 Summer Paralympics in Beijing.

A total of 83 Dutch competitors took part in 13 sports. The athletes that qualified for the 2008 Summer Paralympics are listed below.

== Medalists ==
Medal	Name	Sport	Event
Gold	Mirjam de Koning	Swimming	Women's 100m backstroke S6
Gold	Pieter Gruijters	Athletics	Men's Javelin Throw F55/56
Gold	Esther Vergeer	Wheelchair tennis	Women's singles
Gold	Korie Homan; Sharon Walraven	Wheelchair tennis	Women's doubles
Gold	Mirjam de Koning	Swimming	Women's 50m freestyle S6
Silver	Mirjam de Koning	Swimming	Women's 100m freestyle S6
Silver	Annette Roozen	Athletics	Women's Long Jump F42
Silver	Monique van der Vorst	Cycling	Women's Time Trial HC-A/HC-B/HC-C
Silver	Alfred Stelleman; Jacco Tettelaar	Cycling	Men's Time Trial B&VI
Silver	Monique van der Vorst	Cycling	Women's Road Race HC-A/HC-B/HC-C
Silver	Annette Roozen	Athletics	Women's 100m T42
Silver	Korie Homan	Wheelchair tennis	Women's singles
Silver	Mirjam de Koning	Swimming	Women's 400m freestyle S6
Silver	Esther Vergeer; Jiske Griffioen	Wheelchair tennis	Women's doubles
Silver	Robin Ammerlaan	Wheelchair tennis	Men's singles
Bronze	Mike van der Zanden	Swimming	Men's 100m butterfly S10
Bronze	Sanneke Vermeulen	Judo	Women's -70 kg B3
Bronze	Chantal Boonacker	Swimming	Women's 100m backstroke S7
Bronze	Kelly van Zon	Table tennis	Women's singles S6/7
Bronze	Nico Blok	Table tennis	Men's singles S6/7
Bronze	Maikel Scheffers	Wheelchair tennis	Men's singles
Bronze	Netherlands women's sitting volleyball team: Sanne Bakker; Karin van der Haar-Kramp; Karin Harmsen-Roosen; Paula List; Djoke van Marum; Jolanda Slenter-Weijts; Elvira Stinissen; Josien ten Thije-Voortman; Rika de Vries; Petra Westerhof	Sitting volleyball	Women's team

== Archery ==
1 competitor:

Women

Athlete	Class	Event	Ranking Round		1/16 Finals	1/8 Finals	Quarterfinals	Semifinals	Final	
Athlete	Class	Event	Score	Seed	Opposition Score	Opposition Score	Opposition Score	Opposition Score	Opposition Score	Rank
Eliane Salden	St	Individual Recurve	560	9	Bye	Yamakawa (JPN); W 93-90	Lee (KOR); L 96-107	did not advance		

== Athletics ==
8 competitors:

Men

Athlete	Class	Event	Heats		Semifinal		Final		
Athlete	Class	Event	Result	Rank	Result	Rank	Result	Points	Rank
Jos van der Donk	F42/44 (F42)	Javelin throw	N/A				43.41	876	12
Pieter Gruijters	F55-56 (F56)	Shot put	N/A				11.33	976	7
Pieter Gruijters	F55-56 (F56)	Javelin throw	N/A				42.27 WR	1159	Gold medal
Ronald Hertog	F42/44 (F44)	Javelin throw	N/A				51.69	949	4
Willem Noorduin	F35-36 (F36)	Shot put	N/A				11.27	903	7
Willem Noorduin	F35-36 (F36)	Discus throw	N/A				32.60	934	7
Kenny van Weeghel	F54	100 m	14.36	1 Q	N/A		14.47	-	5
Kenny van Weeghel	F54	200 m	25.00	2 Q	N/A		25.28	-	4
Kenny van Weeghel	F54	400 m	48.69	3 Q	48.72	2 Q	48.52	-	7

Women

Athlete	Class	Event	Heats		Semifinal		Final		
Athlete	Class	Event	Result	Rank	Result	Rank	Result	Points	Rank
Marijke Mettes	T46	100 m	13.30	7	did not advance				
Marijke Mettes	T46	200 m	27.17	5	did not advance				
Marije Smits	T42	100 m	N/A				18.27	-	5
Marije Smits	F42	Long jump	N/A				3.39	-	6
Annette Roozen	T42	100 m	N/A				17.13	-	Silver medal
Annette Roozen	F42	Long jump	N/A				3.63	-	Silver medal

== Cycling ==
5 competitors (+ 1 pilot):

Men

Time trials & Road races

Athlete	Class	Event	Time	Class Factor	Factorized Time	Rank
Mark Homan	CP1-2 (CP1)	Mixed road time trial	31:17.43	0.76768	24:01.26	4
Mark Homan	CP1-2 (CP1)	Mixed road race	1:03:27 (+ 18:22)	-	-	10
Don van der Linden	HC C	Road time trial	22:31.28 (+ 2:14.76)	-	-	8
Don van der Linden	HC C	Road race	1:31:48 (+ 10:08)	-	-	7
Alfred Stelleman; Tandem pilot: Jacco Tettelaar	B&VI 1-3	Track time trial	1:09.077	-	-	12
Alfred Stelleman; Tandem pilot: Jacco Tettelaar	B&VI 1-3	Road time trial	32:28.15 (+ 0:27.03)	-	-	Silver medal
Alfred Stelleman; Tandem pilot: Jacco Tettelaar	B&VI 1-3	Road race	did not finish			

Pursuits

Athlete(s)	Class	Event	Qualifying		Final/ Bronze medal race	
Athlete(s)	Class	Event	Time Speed (km/h)	Rank	Opposition Time Speed (km/h)	Rank
Alfred Stelleman; Tandem pilot: Jacco Tettelaar	B&VI 1-3	Track pursuit	4:40.432; 51.349	9	did not advance	

Women

Athlete	Class	Event	Time	Class Factor	Factorized Time	Rank
Laura de Vaan	HC A-C (HC C)	Road time trial	25:15.15	1.00000	25:15.15	7
Laura de Vaan	HC A-C (HC C)	Road race	1:17:12 (+ 4:12)	-	-	5
Monique van der Vorst	HC A-C (HC C)	Road time trial	23:40.64	1.00000	23:40.64	Silver medal
Monique van der Vorst	HC A-C (HC C)	Road race	1:13:00 (+ 0:00)	-	-	Silver medal

== Equestrian ==
4 competitors:

Individual

Athlete	Class	Horse	Event	Result	Rank
Ineke de Groot	Grade IV	Indo	Championship Test	63.161	7
Ineke de Groot	Grade IV	Indo	Freestyle Test	58.955	13
Sabine Peters	Grade IV	Donna D.M.	Championship Test	62.516	8
Sabine Peters	Grade IV	Donna D.M.	Freestyle Test	65.863	9
Petra van der Sande	Grade II	Toscane	Championship Test	66.909	4
Petra van der Sande	Grade II	Toscane	Freestyle Test	Withdrawn	
Sjerstin Vermeulen	Grade IV	Sultano	Championship Test	66.452	4
Sjerstin Vermeulen	Grade IV	Sultano	Freestyle Test	67.908	7

Team

Athletes	Class	Horses	Event	Team Test			Championship Test			Total	Rank
Athletes	Class	Horses	Event	Result	Team Total	Rank	Result	Team Total	Rank	Total	Rank
Ineke de Groot; Sabine Peters; Petra van der Sande; Sjerstin Vermeulen	Grade IV; Grade IV; Grade II; Grade IV	Indo; Donna D.M. Toscane; Sultano	Team	66.428; 64.500; 60.381# 67.500	198.428	5	63.161; 62.516# 66.909; 66.452	196.522	6	394.950	5

'#' denotes scores that did not count toward the team total.

== Football (7-a-side) ==
12 competitors:

- Bart Adelaars
- Rudy van Breemen
- Jeffrey Bruinier
- Patrick van Kempen
- Stephan Lokhoff
- Joey Mense
- Thieu van Son
- Pawel Statema
- Dennis Straatman
- John Swinkels
- Martijn van de Ven
- Jeroen Voogd

Preliminary round - Group A

September 8
11:15

Brazil	1 – 0	Netherlands
Silva 25'	Report

Olympic Green Hockey Field
Attendance: 8,266
Referee: Guido Gonzalez Torres (Ecuador)

September 10
13:30

Russia	12 – 1	Netherlands
Borisov 12', 20', 51', 57'; Kuvaev 15', 32', 44'; Dzimistarishvili 7', 24'; Chesmin 38'; Potekhin 42'; Nadzharyan 56'	Report	van de Ven 27'

Olympic Green Hockey Field
Attendance: 9,072
Referee: Liu Zhao (China)

September 12
11:15

Netherlands	8 – 1	China
van Kempen 1', 20', 28', 37'; Swinkels 33', 53' van de Ven 9' van Son 22'	Report	Liu 27'

Olympic Green Hockey Field
Attendance: 5,283
Referee: Jorge Eduardo Barbisan (Argentina)

Group table

Team	P	W	D	L	G	GA	GD	Score
Russia (RUS)	3	3	0	0	21	1	+20	9
Brazil (BRA)	3	2	0	1	9	3	+6	6
Netherlands (NED)	3	1	0	2	9	14	-5	3
China (CHN)	3	0	0	3	1	22	-21	0

Classification round

September 14
9:00

Netherlands	4 – 2	Great Britain
Straatman 30', 54'; Lokhoff 33'; Mense 40'	Report	Dimbylow 18'; Ellis 34'

Olympic Green Hockey Field
Attendance: 6,312
Referee: Liu Zhao (China)

5th place match

September 16
11:30

Netherlands	4 – 2	Ireland
Lokhoff 30'+1, 38'; Voogd 5' van de Ven 24'	Report	O'Riordan 7'; Messett 11'

Olympic Green Hockey Field
Attendance: 7,142
Referee: Kou Yadong (China)

== Judo ==
1 competitor:

Women

Athlete	Class	Event	Preliminary	Quarterfinals	Semifinals	Repechage Round	Final/ Bronze medal contest
Athlete	Class	Event	Opposition Result	Opposition Result	Opposition Result	Opposition Result	Opposition Result
Sanneke Vermeulen	B1-3 (B3)	−70 kg	N/A	Szabo (HUN); W 0011-0001	Herrera (ESP); L 0001-0011	N/A	Pernheim (SWE); W 0113-0001

== Rowing ==
5 competitors (plus 1 cox):

Athletes	Class	Event	Heats		Repechage		Final A/B		Total Rank
Athletes	Class	Event	Result	Rank	Result	Rank	Result	Rank	Total Rank
Joleen Hakker; Nienke Vlotman; Martin Lauriks; Paul de Jong; Anne van der Staak (Cox)	LTA	Mixed coxed four	3:45.11	5	3:58.63	5 QFB	3:56.06	4	10

Marleen Sanderse acted as a reserve for the coxed four.

== Sailing ==
1 competitor:

Athlete	Event	Race											Score	Rank
Athlete	Event	1	2	3	4	5	6	7	8	9	10	11	Score	Rank
Thierry Schmitter	1-person keelboat (2.4MR)	5	3	2	~~10~~	7	1	5	~~12~~	6	3	CAN	32	5

CAN - Race cancelled

== Sitting volleyball ==
10 competitors:

Women

- Sanne Bakker
- Karin van der Haar-Kramp
- Karin Harmsen-Roosen
- Paula List
- Djoke van Marum
- Jolanda Slenter-Weijts
- Elvira Stinissen
- Josien ten Thije-Voortman
- Rika de Vries
- Petra Westerhof

Preliminary round - Group A

September 7; 13:30	Netherlands (NED)	3–0	Japan (JPN)	CAU Gymnasium; Attendance: 1,500; Referees: Ronaldo Chaves (Brazil)
September 7; 13:30	(25–4, 25–21, 25–18)			CAU Gymnasium; Attendance: 1,500; Referees: Ronaldo Chaves (Brazil)

September 8; 13:30	Netherlands (NED)	3–1	Ukraine (UKR)	CAU Gymnasium; Attendance: 1,400; Referees: Senad Helać (Bosnia and Herzegovina)
September 8; 13:30	(25–14, 23–25, 25–21, 25–19)			CAU Gymnasium; Attendance: 1,400; Referees: Senad Helać (Bosnia and Herzegovina)

September 10; 17:30	Slovenia (SLO)	2–3	Netherlands (NED)	CAU Gymnasium; Attendance: 1,100; Referees: Khaled Elhelaly (Egypt)
September 10; 17:30	(25–23, 17–25, 16–25, 25–22, 11–15)			CAU Gymnasium; Attendance: 1,100; Referees: Khaled Elhelaly (Egypt)

Group table

Team	P	W	L	Sets	Points
Netherlands (NED)	3	3	0	9:3	6
Slovenia (SLO)	3	2	1	8:5	4
Ukraine (UKR)	3	1	2	5:6	2
Japan (JPN)	3	0	3	1:9	0

Semifinal

September 12; 10:00	Netherlands (NED)	2–3	United States (USA)	CAU Gymnasium; Attendance: 1,300; Referees: Ivana Pavic (Croatia)
September 12; 10:00	(25–19, 23–25, 26–28, 27–25, 10–15)			CAU Gymnasium; Attendance: 1,300; Referees: Ivana Pavic (Croatia)

Bronze medal match

September 14; 16:00	Netherlands (NED)	3–0	Slovenia (SLO)	CAU Gymnasium; Attendance: 3,200; Referees: Ebrahim Firouzi (Iran)
September 14; 16:00	(25–17, 25–16, 26–24)			CAU Gymnasium; Attendance: 3,200; Referees: Ebrahim Firouzi (Iran)

== Swimming ==
7 competitors:

Men

Athlete	Class	Event	Heats		Final	
Athlete	Class	Event	Result	Rank	Result	Rank
Michel Tielbeke	S13	50 m freestyle	26.52	15	did not advance	
Michel Tielbeke	S13	100 m butterfly	1:03.94	14	did not advance	
Michel Tielbeke	SB13	100 m breaststroke	1:14.48	10	did not advance	
Michel Tielbeke	SM13	200 m individual medley	2:24.47	8 Q	2:25.36	8
Mike van der Zanden	S10	100 m freestyle	56.20	9	did not advance	
Mike van der Zanden	S10	400 m freestyle	4:28.40	9	did not advance	
Mike van der Zanden	S10	100 m butterfly	59.97	4 Q	59.39	Bronze medal
Mike van der Zanden	SM10	200 m individual medley	2:24.56	11	did not advance	

Women

Athlete	Class	Event	Heats		Final	
Athlete	Class	Event	Result	Rank	Result	Rank
Chantal Boonacker	S7	50 m freestyle	34.98	3 Q	34.54	4
Chantal Boonacker	S7	100 m freestyle	N/A		1:14.59	4
Chantal Boonacker	S7	400 m freestyle	5:35.89	3 Q	5:35.31	4
Chantal Boonacker	S7	100 m backstroke	1:26.68	3 Q	1:26.30	Bronze medal
Mirjam de Koning	S6	50 m freestyle	36.38	1 Q	35.60 WR	Gold medal
Mirjam de Koning	S6	100 m freestyle	1:18.56	1 Q	1:19.29	Silver medal
Mirjam de Koning	S6	400 m freestyle	5:57.72	2 Q	5:43.76	Silver medal
Mirjam de Koning	S6	100 m backstroke	1:32.65	2 Q	1:28.34	Gold medal
Bernadette Massar	S7	50 m butterfly	45.53	11	did not advance	
Bernadette Massar	SB7	100 m breaststroke	N/A		1:49.29	6
Mendy Meenderink	S9	50 m freestyle	31.15	8 Q	31.20	8
Mendy Meenderink	S9	100 m freestyle	1:06.85	13	did not advance	
Mendy Meenderink	S9	400 m freestyle	5:06.97	9	did not advance	
Lisette Teunissen	S5	50 m freestyle	45.68	9	did not advance	
Lisette Teunissen	S5	200 m freestyle	3:23.57	6 Q	3:22.89	5
Lisette Teunissen	S5	50 m backstroke	51.49	5 Q	50.87	4

== Table tennis ==
4 competitors:

Men

Athlete	Class	Event	Group Match 1	Group Match 2	Group Match 3	1/8 Finals	Quarterfinals	Semifinals	Final/ Bronze medal match
Athlete	Class	Event	Opposition Result	Opposition Result	Opposition Result	Opposition Result	Opposition Result	Opposition Result	Opposition Result
Nico Blok	TT6	Singles	Jensen (DEN); W 3-2	Itkonen (SWE); W 3-2	Thainiyom (THA); W 3-0	N/A		Arnold (GER); L 1-3	Schmidt (GER); W 3-1
Tonnie Heijnen	TT9-10	Singles	Leibovitz (USA); L 0-3	Miettinen (FIN); L 0-3	did not advance				
Gerben Last	TT9-10	Singles	Karlsson (SWE); W 3-0	Gaspar (SVK); W 3-0	N/A	Olufemi (NGR); W 3-0	Berecki (HUN); W 3-0	Ge (CHN); L 0-3	Andersson (SWE); L 1-3
Tonnie Heijnen; Gerben Last	TT9-10	Team	N/A			Nigeria; W 3-1	Spain; L 0-3	did not advance	

Women

Athlete	Class	Event	Group Match 1	Group Match 2	Group Match 3	1/8 Finals	Quarterfinals	Semifinals	Final/ Bronze medal match
Athlete	Class	Event	Opposition Result	Opposition Result	Opposition Result	Opposition Result	Opposition Result	Opposition Result	Opposition Result
Kelly van Zon	TT6-7	Singles	Julian (AUS); W 3-2	Pitry (POL); W 3-0	N/A			Martyasheva (RUS); L 2-3	Afify (EGY); W 3-0

== Wheelchair basketball ==
12 competitors:

Women

- Barbara van Bergen
- Patries Boekhoorn
- Sandra Braam
- Petra Garnier
- Inge Huitzing
- Chèr Korver
- Roos Oosterbaan
- Elsbeth van Oostrom
- Fleur Pieterse
- Brenda Ramaekers
- Carina Versloot
- Jitske Visser

Preliminary round - Group B

September 7
12:15

Report

Netherlands	59–46	Mexico
Scoring by quarter: 18-11, 11-15, 12-8, 18-12
Pts: van Oostrom 21; Rebs: Huitzing 7, Versloot 7 Asts: Versloot 4		Pts: Vazquez 21; Rebs: Vazquez 17; Asts: Miranda 3

USTB Gymnasium, Beijing
Attendance: 2,140
Referees: Matthew Wells (Australia)

September 8
11:15

Report

Canada	59–32	Netherlands
Scoring by quarter: 10-4, 19-12, 14-10, 16-6
Pts: Benoit 14; Rebs: Thomas 10; Asts: Thomas 6		Pts: Korver 8, Garnier 8 Rebs: Garnier 11; Asts: Korver 4

National Indoor Stadium, Beijing
Attendance: 7,660
Referees: Juan Manuel Urunuela (Spain)

September 10
10:00

Report

Netherlands	49–65	Japan
Scoring by quarter: 12-21, 10-12, 19-12, 8-20
Pts: van Oostrom 17; Rebs: Huitzing 11; Asts: Oosterbaan 5		Pts: Takubo 25; Rebs: Takubo 6, Amimoto 6 Asts: Takubo 6

USTB Gymnasium, Beijing
Attendance: 964
Referees: Charles Saunders (South Africa)

September 11
17:45

Report

China	35–51	Netherlands
Scoring by quarter: 10-12, 8-17, 9-12, 8-10
Pts: Cao 8 Rebs: Fu 11; Asts: Liu 3		Pts: van Oostrom 23; Rebs: Huitzing 11; Asts: Oosterbaan 3, Korver 3

USTB Gymnasium, Beijing
Attendance: 1,567
Referees: Rui David Marques (Brazil)

Group table

Team	Pts	W	L	PF	PA	PD	Pts
Japan	4	4	0	221	181	+40	8
Canada	4	3	1	244	169	+75	7
Netherlands	4	2	2	191	205	-14	6
China	4	1	3	178	199	-21	5
Mexico	4	0	4	155	235	-80	4

Quarterfinal

September 12
19:00

Report

Germany	43–28	Netherlands
Scoring by quarter: 4-4, 17-13, 12-11, 10-0
Pts: Kahl 14; Rebs: Kahl 10; Asts: Mohnen 3, Butterbrodt 3		Pts: Huitzing 11; Rebs: Korver 8 Asts: Korver 2

National Indoor Stadium, Beijing
Attendance: 12,215
Referees: Matias Quintana (Argentina)

Classification round

September 14
11:15

Report

Netherlands	46–39	Great Britain
Scoring by quarter: 11-8, 12-13, 6-8, 17-10
Pts: van Oostrom 17; Rebs: Garnier 8 Asts: Korver 6		Pts: Turner 11; Rebs: MacLean 7, Turner 7, Freeman 7 Asts: MacLean 5

National Indoor Stadium, Beijing
Attendance: 12,000
Referees: Adrianos Pavlopoulos (Greece)

5th place game

September 15
15:45

Report

Canada	61–32	Netherlands
Scoring by quarter: 15-14, 16-8, 18-4, 12-6
Pts: Pettinicchi 14; Rebs: Radke 8 Asts: Harnock 2		Pts: Huitzing 12; Rebs: Huitzing 7 Asts: Oosterbaan 1, van Oostrom 1, Versloot 1

National Indoor Stadium, Beijing
Attendance: 12,000
Referees: Ziv Radomsky (Israel)

== Wheelchair tennis ==
11 competitors:

Men

Athlete	Class	Event	Round of 64	Round of 32	Round of 16	Quarterfinals	Semifinals	Final/ Bronze medal match
Athlete	Class	Event	Opposition Score	Opposition Score	Opposition Score	Opposition Score	Opposition Score	Opposition Score
Robin Ammerlaan	Open	Singles	Reid (GBR); W 6-3, 6-0	Rajakaruna (SRI); W 6-0, 6-0	Welch (GBR); W 6-2, 6-3	Saida (JPN); W 6-4, 6-2	Vink (NED); W 7-5, 4-6, 7-6(6)	Kunieda (JPN); L 3-6, 0-6
Bas van Erp	Open	Mixed Quad Singles	N/A		Raffaele (ITA); W 6-1, 6-1	Taylor (USA); L 6-1, 5-7, 6-7(1)	did not advance	
Maikel Scheffers	Open	Singles	Farkas (HUN); W 6-3, 6-4	Lee (KOR); W 6-2, 6-1	Fujimoto (JPN); W 6-1, 6-1	Jeremiasz (FRA); W 6-3, 6-3	Kunieda (JPN); L 1-6, 1-6	Vink (NED); W 6-3, 6-1
Eric Stuurman	Open	Singles	Shi (CHN); W 6-4, 6-4	Kunieda (JPN); L 2-6, 1-6	did not advance			
Ronald Vink	Open	Singles	Moran (USA); W 6-0, 6-1	Tur (ESP); W 6-1, 6-0	Legner (AUT); W 6-4, 6-3	Houdet (FRA); W 6-2, 6-1	Ammerlaan (NED); L 5-7, 6-4, 6-7(6)	Scheffers (NED); L 3-6, 1-6
Robin Ammerlaan; Eric Stuurman	Open	Doubles	N/A	Bye	Felix - Gergely (SVK); W 6-2, 6-2	Olsson - Wikstrom (SWE); L 6-7(5), 4-6	did not advance	
Maikel Scheffers; Ronald Vink	Open	Doubles	N/A	Bye	Rydberg - Welch (USA); W 6-3, 6-1	Jaroszewski - Kruszelnicki (POL); W 6-0, 6-1	Houdet - Jeremiasz (FRA); L 3-6, 1-6	Kunieda - Saida (JPN); L 6-3, 0-6, 2-6

Women

Athlete	Class	Event	Round of 32	Round of 16	Quarterfinals	Semifinals	Final/ Bronze medal match
Athlete	Class	Event	Opposition Score	Opposition Score	Opposition Score	Opposition Score	Opposition Score
Monique de Beer	Open	Mixed Quad Singles	N/A	Norfolk (GBR); L 1-6, 1-6	did not advance		
Jiske Griffioen	Open	Singles	Okabe (JPN); W 6-2, 6-4	Hwang (KOR); W 6-1, 6-0	Arnoult (USA); W 6-3, 6-0	Vergeer (NED); L 0-6, 1-6	Gravellier (FRA); L 3-6, 4-6
Korie Homan	Open	Singles	Chokyu (CAN); W 6-1, 6-2	Hong (KOR); W 6-0, 6-1	Hu (CHN); W 6-1, 6-1	Gravellier (FRA); W 6-4, 6-2	Vergeer (NED); L 2-6, 6-4, 6-7(5)
Dorrie Timmermans-Van Hall	Open	Mixed Quad Singles	N/A	Polidori (ITA); W 6-1, 3-6, 6-3	Andersson (SWE); L 3-6, 1-6	did not advance	
Esther Vergeer	Open	Singles	di Toro (AUS); W 6-2, 6-0	Krüger (GER); W 6-1, 6-0	Dong (CHN); W 6-2, 6-0	Griffioen (NED); W 6-0, 6-1	Homan (NED); W 6-2, 4-6, 7-6(5)
Sharon Walraven	Open	Singles	Ochoa (ESP); W 6-2, 6-1	Verfuerth (USA); W 6-1, 7-5	Gravellier (FRA); L 1-6, 4-6	did not advance	
Jiske Griffioen; Esther Vergeer	Open	Doubles	N/A	Bye	Okabe - Yaosa (JPN); W 6-1, 6-2	Arnoult - Verfuerth (USA); W 6-2, 6-1	Homan - Walraven (NED); L 6-2, 6-7(4), 4-6
Korie Homan; Sharon Walraven	Open	Doubles	N/A	Bye	Dong - Hu (CHN); W 6-0, 6-2	Gravellier - Racineux (FRA); W 6-4, 6-3	Griffioen - Vergeer (NED); W 2-6, 7-6(4), 6-4

Mixed Doubles

Athletes	Class	Event	Quarterfinals	Semifinals	Final/ Bronze medal match
Athletes	Class	Event	Opposition Score	Opposition Score	Opposition Score
Dorrie Timmermans-Van Hall; Bas van Erp	Open	Quad Doubles	Polidori - Raffaele (ITA); W 6-0, 6-2	Taylor - Wagner (USA); L 3-6, 4-6	Burdekin - Norfolk (GBR); L 7-6(4), 5-7, 1-6

== See also ==
- 2008 Summer Paralympics
- Netherlands at the Paralympics
- Netherlands at the 2008 Summer Olympics
