= Sitting volleyball at the 2004 Summer Paralympics =

Volleyball event from 2004

Sitting volleyball at the XII Paralympic Games
- Paralympic sitting volleyball
- Venue: Helliniko Fencing Hall
- Dates: 21–27 September 2004

Medalists
1st place, gold medalist(s)		Bosnia and Herzegovina (BIH) (men); China (CHN) (women)
2nd place, silver medalist(s)		Iran (IRI) (men); Netherlands (NED) (women)
3rd place, bronze medalist(s)		Egypt (EGY) (men); United States (USA) (women)

Sitting volleyball at the 2004 Summer Paralympics was staged at the Helliniko Fencing Hall from 21 to 27 September. Two team events were held, one for men and one for women. The sport is performed sitting down, on a smaller court with a lower net.

This was the first Summer Paralympic Games without standing volleyball events, which had been included from the introduction of volleyball in 1976 (when sitting volleyball was a demonstration event) through 2000.

The tournament brought Bosnia and Herzegovina their first ever Paralympic gold medal. Their team consisted of players injured in the War of 1992-95.

== Men's tournament ==
Sitting volleyball - Men at the XII Paralympic Games
- Venue: Helliniko Fencing Hall
- Dates: 21–27 September 2004
- Competitors: 8

Medalists
1st place, gold medalist(s)		Dževad Hamzić; Nedzad Salkic; Safet Alibašić; Sabahudin Delalić; Ermin Jusufović; Zikret Mahmic; Fikret Causevic; Asim Medić; Esad Durmisevic; Ejub Mehmedovic; Adnan Manko; Ismet Godinjak	Bosnia and Herzegovina
2nd place, silver medalist(s)		Ramzan Salehi Hajikolaei; Isa Zirahi; Seyed Saeid Ebrahimi Baladezaei; Jalil Eimeri; Naser Hassanpour Alinazari; Ali Golkar Azghandi; Mahdi Hamid Zadeh; Davood Alipourian; Sadegh Beigdeli; Mohammad Reza Rahimi	Iran
3rd place, bronze medalist(s)		Hossam Massoud; Yassir Ibrahim; Abdel Naby Abdel Latif; Rezk El Helbawi; Mohamed Abou Elyazid; Salah Hassanein; Mohamed Emara; Taher El Bahaey; Ashraf Abdalla; Abd Elaal Abd Elaal; Tamer Awad; Hesham El Shwikh	Egypt

The men's tournament was won by the team representing Bosnia and Herzegovina.

=== Results ===
==== Preliminaries ====
For ranking purposes - no elimination

Rank	Competitor	MP	W	L	Sets	Points	IRI	GER	FIN	JPN
1	Iran	3	3	0	9:0	6	x	3:0	3:0	3:0
2	Germany	3	2	1	6:3	5	0:3	x	3:0	3:0
3	Finland	3	1	2	3:6	4	0:3	0:3	x	3:0
4	Japan	3	0	3	0:9	3	0:3	0:3	0:3	x

===== Group B =====
Rank	Competitor	MP	W	L	Sets	Points	BIH	EGY	USA	GRE
1	Bosnia and Herzegovina	3	3	0	9:0	6	x	3:0	3:0	3:0
2	Egypt	3	2	1	6:3	5	0:3	x	3:0	3:0
3	United States	3	1	2	3:7	4	0:3	0:3	x	3:1
4	Greece	3	0	3	1:9	3	0:3	0:3	1:3	x

==== Competition bracket ====
Quarterfinals
Germany	3
United States	0
Japan	0
Bosnia and Herzegovina	3
Iran	3
Greece	0
Finland	1
Egypt	3

Semifinals
Germany	0
Bosnia and Herzegovina	3
Iran	3
Egypt	0

Finals
Bosnia and Herzegovina	3
Iran	2
Third place
Egypt	3
Germany	2

==== Classification 5–8 ====
Semi-finals
Greece	0
Finland	3
United States	3
Japan	2

Fifth place
Finland	3
United States	0
Third place
Greece	1
Japan	3

=== Team lists ===
Iran; Ramzan Salehi Hajikolaei; Isa Zirahi; Seyed Saeid Ebrahimi Baladezaei; Jalil Eimeri; Naser Hassanpour Alinazari; Ali Golkar Azghandi; Mahdi Hamid Zadeh; Davood Alipourian; Sadegh Beigdeli; Mohammad Reza Rahimi	Germany; Stefan Wischnewski; Juergen Schrapp; Benjamin Paolo Oesch; Martin Rickmann; Steffen Barsch; Mario Scheler; Siegmund Soicke; Alexander Schiffler; Robert Grylak; Thomas Renger; Jens Faerber; Uwe Haussig	Finland; Lasse Pakarinen; Matti Pulli; Timo Herranen; Lauri Melanen; Sami Tervo; Martti Eronen; Petri Kapiainen; Jukka Laine; Keijo Hanninen; Olavi Venalainen	Japan; Koki Todo; Tadashi Tamura; Yoshihito Takeda; Atsushi Yonezawa; Tsutomu Tanabe; Yosuke Kurita; Satoshi Kanao; Kaname Nakayama; Masahiko Kato; Arata Yamamoto; Hitoshi Yoshida; Koji Tanaka
Bosnia and Herzegovina; Dževad Hamzić; Nedzad Salkic; Safet Alibašić; Sabahudin Delalic; Ermin Jusufović; Zikret Mahmic; Fikret Causevic; Asim Medić; Esad Durmisevic; Ejub Mehmedovic; Adnan Manko; Ismet Godinjak	Egypt; Hossam Massoud; Yassir Ibrahim; Abdel Naby Abdel Latif; Rezk El Helbawi; Mohamed Abou Elyazid; Salah Hassanein; Mohamed Emara; Taher El Bahaey; Ashraf Abdalla; Abd Elaal Abd Elaal; Tamer Awad; Hesham El Shwikh	United States; Joey Evans; Brent Rasmussen; Curtis Lease; Chris Seilkop; Tracey Lange; Paul Moran; Essam Hamido; Robert Osbahr; Eric Duda; Rene Aquino; Jeffrey MacMunn; William Steen	Greece; Marinos Anagnostopoulos; Christos Konstantakopoulos; Georgios Zafeiropoulos; Panagiotis Vakondios; Nikolaos Mallios; Ioannis Soukiouroglou; Emmanouil Touloupakis; Anastasios Kostaris; Ioannis Somos; Eleftherios Lamprakis; Kyriakos Makris; Emmanouil Drakonakis

== Women's tournament ==
Sitting volleyball - Women at the XII Paralympic Games
- Venue: Helliniko Fencing Hall
- Dates: 21–27 September 2004
- Competitors: 6

Medalists
1st place, gold medalist(s)		Chen Yu Ping; Sheng Yu Hong; Yang Yan Ling; Xue Jun; Zhang Xu Fei; Li Li Ping; Zhao Jin Qiu; Zheng Xiong Ying; Zhong Hai Hong; Gong Bin; Tan Yanhua; Lu Hong Qin	China
2nd place, silver medalist(s)		Paula List; Jolanda Slenter; Petra Westerhof; Marijke Roest; Alberta Ten Thije; Karin Harmsen; Aletta Adema Salagter; Els Verwer; Maria Poiesz; Djoke van Marum; Anneke den Haan; Monique Bons	Netherlands
3rd place, bronze medalist(s)		Allison Ahlfeldt; Gina McWilliams; Allison Aldrich; Bonnie Brawner; Kendra Lancaster; Deborah Vosler; Hope Lewellen; Lora Webster; Lori Daniels; Brenda Maymon; Penny Ricker; Erica Moyers	United States

The women's tournament was won by the team representing China.

=== Results ===
==== Preliminaries ====
Qualified for final round

Rank	Competitor	MP	W	L	Sets	Points	CHN	NED	USA	SLO	FIN	UKR
1	China	5	5	0	15:1	10	x	3:1	3:0	3:0	3:0	3:0
2	Netherlands	5	4	1	13:3	9	1:3	x	3:0	3:0	3:0	3:0
3	United States	5	3	2	9:12	8	0:3	0:3	x	3:2	3:2	3:2
4	Slovenia	5	2	3	8:10	7	0:3	0:3	2:3	x	3:1	3:0
5	Finland	5	1	4	6:14	6	0:3	0:3	2:3	1:3	x	3:2
6	Ukraine	5	0	5	4:15	5	0:3	0:3	2:3	0:3	2:3	x

==== Competition bracket ====
Semi-finals
China	3
Slovenia	0
Netherlands	3
United States	0

Final
China	3
Netherlands	1
Third place
Slovenia	1
United States	3

==== Classification 5/6 ====
Finland	1 – 3	Ukraine

=== Team lists ===
China; Chen Yu Ping; Sheng Yu Hong; Yang Yan Ling; Xue Jun; Zhang Xu Fei; Li Li Ping; Zhao Jin Qiu; Zheng Xiong Ying; Zhong Hai Hong; Gong Bin; Tan Yanhua; Lu Hong Qin	Netherlands; Paula List; Jolanda Slenter; Petra Westerhof; Marijke Roest; Alberta Ten Thije; Karin Harmsen; Aletta Adema Salagter; Els Verwer; Maria Poiesz; Djoke van Marum; Anneke den Haan; Monique Bons	United States; Allison Ahlfeldt; Gina McWilliams; Allison Aldrich; Bonnie Brawner; Kendra Lancaster; Deborah Vosler; Hope Lewellen; Lora Webster; Lori Daniels; Brenda Maymon; Penny Ricker; Erica Moyers	Slovenia; Tanja Simonic; Sasa Kotnik; Stefka Tomic; Danica Gosnak; Alenka Sart; Nadja Ovcjak; Marinka Cencelj; Bogomira Jakin; Boza Kovacic; Emilie Gradisek; Anita Goltnik Urnaut
Finland; Liisa Makela; Petra Pitkaniitty; Minna Hiltunen; Anne Mari Maki; Raisa Moller; Liisa Jokipii; Annukka Jaattenmaki; Paivi Sivula; Tiina Jalo; Maria Paavola	Ukraine; Oleksandra Granovska; Ilona Yudina; Olena Yurkovska; Galyna Kuznetsova; Lyubov Lomakina; Nataliya Parshutina; Tetyana Podzyuban; Inna Osetynska		

== See also ==
- Volleyball at the 2004 Summer Olympics
