= Lijuan =

Lijuan (Chinese: 丽娟) is a feminine given name. Notable people with the name include:

- Deng Lijuan (Chinese: 邓丽娟; born 2000), Chinese speed climber
- Geng Lijuan (Chinese: 耿丽娟; born 1963), Chinese-Canadian table tennis player
- Liu Lijuan (rower) (born 1978), Chinese rower
- Liu Lijuan (sitting volleyball) (born 1984), Chinese Paralympic sitting volleyball player
- Pang Lijuan (Chinese: 庞丽娟), Chinese educator and politician
- Shen Lijuan (Chinese: 沈丽娟; born 1958), Chinese shot putter
- Xiu Lijuan (Chinese: 修丽娟; born 1957), Chinese basketball player
- Lijuan Yuan (Chinese: 袁丽娟), Chinese-American virologist
- Zou Lijuan (born 1994), Chinese track and field athlete
