= Judo at the 2008 Summer Paralympics – Women's 70 kg =

The women's 70 kg judo competition at the 2008 Summer Paralympics was held on September 9 at the Beijing Workers' Gymnasium. Preliminary rounds started at 12:00 pm CST. Repechage finals, semifinals, bouts for bronze medals, and the final were held at 5:30 pm CST.

This event was the second-heaviest of the women's judo weight classes, limiting competitors to a maximum of 70 kilograms of body mass. Like all other judo events, bouts lasted five minutes. If the bout was still tied at the end, it was extended for another five-minute, sudden-death period; if neither judoka scored during that period, the match is decided by the judges. The tournament bracket consisted of a single-elimination contest culminating in a gold medal match. There was also a repechage to determine the winners of the two bronze medals. Each judoka who had lost to a semifinalist competed in the repechage. The two judokas who lost in the semifinals faced the winner of the opposite half of the bracket's repechage in bronze medal bouts.

== Medalists ==
| Gold | Carmen Herrera; Spain |
| Silver | Lenia Ruvalcaba; Mexico |
| Bronze | Tatiana Savostyanova; Russia |
| Bronze | Sanneke Vermeulen; Netherlands |

== Tournament results ==
First Round
Jordan Mouton (USA) | 0000
Carmen Herrera (ESP) | 1000
Sanneke Vermeulen (NED) | 0011^{1}
Nikolett Szabo (HUN) | 0001^{1}
Lenia Ruvalcaba (MEX) | 0200
Nicolina Pernheim (SWE) | 0000
Tatiana Savostyanova (RUS)
Bye

Semifinals
Carmen Herrera (ESP) | 0011^{1}
Sanneke Vermeulen (NED) | 0001
Lenia Ruvalcaba (MEX) | 0110^{1}
Tatiana Savostyanova (RUS) | 0101^{3}

Final
Carmen Herrera (ESP) | 1021
Lenia Ruvalcaba (MEX) | 0000^{1}

=== Repechage ===
Semifinals
Jordan Mouton (USA) | 0000
Nikolett Szabo (HUN) | 1000
Nicolina Pernheim (SWE)
Bye

Bronze medal finals
Nikolett Szabo (HUN) | 0000
Tatiana Savostyanova (RUS) | 1000
Nicolina Pernheim (SWE) | 0001^{1}
Sanneke Vermeulen (NED) | 0113
