= Liu Lijuan =

Liu Lijuan may refer to:

- Liu Lijuan (rower)
- Liu Lijuan (sitting volleyball)
