= Voortman =

Voortman is a Dutch topographic surname. In this case, -man is a suffix for a geographic affiliation and voort means 'ford'. Notable people with the surname include:

- Eva Voortman, Dutch softball player
- Josien Ten Thije-Voortman (born 1959), Dutch sitting volleyball player
- Linda Voortman (born 1979), Dutch politician and trade unionist

== See also ==
- Van der Voort
