= Jolanda Slenter =

Dutch sitting volleyball player (born 1965)

Personal information
- Nationality: Dutch
- Born: 15 June 1965 (age 61); Maastricht

Volleyball information
- Number: 9

Career
Years	Teams
2012	(Netherlands) Holyoke

National team
2004-	Netherlands sitting volleyball team

Jolanda Slenter (born 15 June 1965) is a Dutch female Paralympic sitting volleyball player. She is part of the Netherlands women's national sitting volleyball team.

She competed at the 2004 Summer Paralympics, 2008 Summer Paralympics, and 2012 Summer Paralympics, finishing 4th, after losing from Ukraine in the bronze medal match. On club level she played for Holyoke in 2012.

== See also ==
- Netherlands at the 2012 Summer Paralympics
