= Alexandra Gouldie =

American Paralympic volleyball player (born 1991)

Alex Gouldie

Personal information
- Full name: Alexandra Elizabeth Gouldie
- Born: May 13, 1991 (age 35); Grand Island, Nebraska, U.S.
- Hometown: St. Paul, Nebraska, U.S.
- Height: 5 ft 7 in (170 cm)
- Weight: 170 lb (77 kg)
Medal record
Women's sitting volleyball
Representing United States
Paralympic Games
Silver medal – second place	2008 Beijing	Team
WOVD Intercontinental Cup
Bronze medal – third place	2008 Ismaïlia, Egypt	Team

Alexandra Elizabeth Gouldie (born May 13, 1991) is an American former Paralympic volleyballer.

== Biography ==
Gouldie was born in Grand Island, Nebraska. She took part at 2008 Paralympics which were held in Beijing, China where she got her silver medal by leading her team to win 3–0 against Latvia. The same year she participated at World Organization Volleyball for Disabled at Ismaïlia, Egypt where she won a bronze one.
