= Gina McWilliams =

American paralympic volleyballer

Personal information
- Nationality: American
- Born: July 16, 1965 (age 61)
- Hometown: Carrollton, Texas, U.S.
- Height: 5 ft 9 in (1.75 m)
Medal record
Women's sitting volleyball
Representing United States
Paralympic Games
Bronze medal – third place	2004 Athens, Greece	Team
Silver medal – second place	2008 Beijing, China	Team
World Championships
Silver medal – second place	2010 Edmond, Oklahoma	Team
WOVD Intercontinental Cup
Bronze medal – third place	2008 Ismaïlia, Egypt	Team
Parapan American Games
Gold medal – first place	2003 Mar del Plata, Argentina	Team

Gina McWilliams (born July 16, 1975) is a former American Paralympic volleyballer.

== Competition ==
McWilliams started competing for Paralympic Games in 2003 where she won a gold medal for her participation at Parapan American Games in Mar del Plata, Argentina. In 2004, she participated in 2004 Paralympic Games which were held in Athens, Greece and where she got her first bronze medal. In 2008 she participated at World Organization Volleyball for Disabled which was held at Ismaïlia, Egypt and where McWilliams got second bronze. In 2008 Paralympics which were held in Beijing, China she won a silver medal for Women's Sitting Volleyball. In 2010, she won one more silver medal for Sitting Volleyball World Championships.

== Personal life ==
McWilliams is married and had two children. She resides in Carrollton, Texas.
