= Allison Ahlfeldt =

American volleyball player (born c. 1978)

Personal information
- Nationality: American
- Born: 1978 (age 47–48)
- Hometown: Costa Mesa, California
Medal record
Women's sitting volleyball
Representing United States
Paralympic Games
Bronze medal – third place	2004 Athens, Greece	Team

Allison Ahlfeldt (born c. 1978) is an American Paralympic volleyball player. She studied at University of California-Irvine.

== Competition ==
In 2000, she played with the Men's team, but was excluded from international competition. In 2004, she participated in 2004 Paralympic Games which were held in Athens, Greece and where she won a bronze medal.
