= Bonnie Brawner =

American Paralympic volleyball player (born 1964) )

Personal information
- Full name: Bonnie Brawner
- Nationality: American
- Born: January 19, 1963 (age 63)
- Home town: Seguin, Texas
- Height: 5 ft 7 in (1.70 m)
Medal record
Women's sitting volleyball
Representing United States
Paralympic Games
Bronze medal – third place	2004 Athens	Team

Bonnie Brawner is an American Paralympic volleyball player, and teacher.

== Career ==
She won a bronze medal at the 2004 Summer Paralympics which were held in Athens, Greece.
