= Allison Aldrich =

American Paralympic volleyballist (born 1988)

Personal information
- Full name: Allison Elizabeth Aldrich
- Born: January 19, 1988 (age 38); Schuyler, Nebraska, U.S.
- Hometown: Schuyler, Nebraska, U.S.
- Height: 5 ft 10 in (1.78 m)
Medal record
Women's sitting volleyball
Representing United States
Paralympic Games
Bronze medal – third place	2004 Athens	Team
Silver medal – second place	2008 Beijing	Team
Silver medal – second place	2012 London	Team
World Championships
Silver medal – second place	2010 Edmond, Oklahoma	Team
WOVD Intercontinental Cup
Bronze medal – third place	2008 Ismailia, Egypt	Team
WOVD World Cup
Gold medal – first place	2010 Port Said, Egypt	Team
Parapan American Zonal Championships
Gold medal – first place	2009 Denver, Colorado	Team
Gold medal – first place	2011 Sao Paulo, Brazil	Team
Parapan American Championship
Gold medal – first place	2010 Denver, Colorado	Team
Sitting Volleyball Invitational
Silver medal – second place	2007 Shanghai, China	Team
Euro Cup
Gold medal – first place	2009 Roermond, Netherlands	Team
ECVD Continental Cup
Gold medal – first place	2011 Yevpatoria, Ukraine	Team
Volleyball Masters
Gold medal – first place	2012 Leersum, Netherlands	Team

Allison Elizabeth Aldrich (born January 19, 1988) is an American Paralympic volleyballist.

== Early life ==
Aldrich was born in Schuyler, Nebraska. In 1995, when she was only 7 years old she was diagnosed with sarcoma a cell cancer. Aldrich was featured in Omaha World-Herald article in 2004. In March 2004 she received an invitation to a sitting volleyball camp in Denver, where she was tried for Paralympics. She graduated from Schuyler Central High School in 2006 and from that year attends Nebraska Wesleyan University. She used to be a member of National Honor Society from which she won the Ron Gustafson Inspirational Award.

== Career ==
She got her first medal which was bronze in 2004 Paralympic Games which were held in Athens, Greece. In 2007, she won a silver medal for her participation in Sitting Volleyball Invitational. In 2008, she was awarded another silver medal in Paralympic Games in Beijing and the same year was given a bronze medal for participation at World Organization Volleyball for Disabled Intercontinental Cup. Gold medals for her started in 2009 when she won a Parapan American Zonal Championship and Paralympic EuroCup. 2010 brought her another silver medal for her participation in WOVD and another gold one for World Cup. The same year she participated and won at Parapan American Championship in Colorado where she earned another gold medal. In 2011, she was awarded with two more gold medals for her role in ECVD Continental Cup and for PAZC. At 2012 Paralympic Games she was awarded a silver medal and won gold for Volleyball Masters.

== Personal life ==
On occasion she travels to Shriners Hospital in Minneapolis, Minnesota to get a prosthetists opinion on her leg health which she lost in a battle with cancer at University of Nebraska Medical Center. In her spare time she likes to watch The Sisterhood of the Traveling Pants and Kobe Bryant. When it comes to sports she likes to watch Miami Dolphins and Los Angeles Lakers. She is also a Health Teacher at Walnut Middle School in Grand Island, Nebraska. She teaches safe sex, pregnancy, germs, cancer and many other health subjects.
