= Zhong Haihong =

Chinese Paralympic sitting volleyball player

Zhong Haihong 钟海虹
Personal information
- Born: 2 January 1978 (age 48)
- Home town: Shanghai, China
- Education: Shanghai Open University

Volleyball information

National team
- Years: Team
- 2004–2008: China
Honours
Women's sitting volleyball
Representing China
Paralympic Games
Gold medal – first place	2004 Athens	Team
Gold medal – first place	2008 Beijing	Team

Zhong Haihong
- Simplified Chinese: 钟海虹
Transcriptions
Standard Mandarin
- Hanyu Pinyin: Zhōng Hǎihóng

Zhong Haihong (Chinese: 钟海虹, born 2 January 1978) is a Chinese former Paralympic sitting volleyball player. A two-time Paralympic champion, she won gold with the China women's national team at the 2004 Athens and 2008 Beijing Games.

== Early life ==
Zhong is from Shanghai and contracted poliomyelitis when she was one year old. She studied at the Jing'an branch of the Shanghai Radio and Television University, now part of Shanghai Open University.

== Career ==
Zhong was a member of the China women's national sitting volleyball team. The women's sitting volleyball tournament made its Paralympic debut at the 2004 Games in Athens, where China took the inaugural gold medal ahead of the Netherlands and the United States. Zhong was part of that gold-medal-winning side.

At the 2008 Games in Beijing, hosted by China, the team retained the title, again finishing above the United States and the Netherlands, and Zhong won a second Paralympic gold. China was the only nation to win the women's event in its early editions, claiming gold at Athens 2004, Beijing 2008 and London 2012.

== See also ==
- China at the 2004 Summer Paralympics
- China at the 2008 Summer Paralympics
