= SuGui Kriss =

American Paralympic volleyball player (born 1987)

Personal information
- Nationality: American
- Born: Yang SuGui; July 6, 1987 (age 39); Kunming, Yunnan, China
- Height: 5 ft 2 in (1.57 m)
- Weight: 130 lb (59 kg)
Medal record
Women's sitting volleyball
Representing United States
Paralympic Games
Silver medal – second place	2008 Beijing	Team
Sitting Volleyball Invitational
Silver medal – second place	2007 Shanghai, China	Team
WOVD Intercontinental Cup
Bronze medal – third place	2008 Ismaïlia, Egypt	Team

SuGui Kriss (birth name Yang SuGui; born July 6, 1987) is a former American Paralympic volleyballer.

== Biography ==
Kriss was born in Kunming, Yunnan province, China from where she was adopted when she was 8 years old. She started competing for Paralympic Games in 2006, when she got into the 5th place at Netherlands' Sitting Volleyball World Championship.

In 2007, she got her first medal which was silver for her participation at Sitting volleyball Invitational in Shanghai, China. The same year she visited her orphanage for a month and a half. She came back to her homeland for the 2008 Paralympics which were held in Beijing, during which she first carried an American flag and won a silver medal.

The same year she got a bronze medal for her participation at World Organization Volleyball for Disabled at Ismaïlia, Egypt.
