= Sitting volleyball at the 2008 Summer Paralympics =

Sitting volleyball at the XIII Paralympic Games
- Paralympic sitting volleyball
- Venue: China Agricultural University Gymnasium
- Dates: 7–15 September 2008

Medalists
1st place, gold medalist(s)		Iran (IRI) (men); China (CHN) (women)
2nd place, silver medalist(s)		Bosnia and Herzegovina (BIH) (men); United States (USA) (women)
3rd place, bronze medalist(s)		Russia (RUS) (men); Netherlands (NED) (women)

Sitting volleyball at the 2008 Summer Paralympics was held in the China Agricultural University Gymnasium from 7 September to 15 September. Two team events were held, one for men and one for women.

In the men's sitting event, Bosnia and Herzegovina were the defending champions. Bosnia and Herzegovina and Iran had been the finalists in both 2000 and 2004, with Iran winning in 2000 and Bosnia and Herzegovina in 2004. These two countries met once more in the final in Beijing, with Iran emerging victorious by 3 goals to nil. Egypt, the bronze medal-winners of 2008, finished fourth, beaten 2:3 by Russia, who took bronze.

The Beijing Games marked the second time the women's sitting event was held. China were the defending champions, while the Netherlands had taken silver, and the United States bronze, in 2004. In Beijing, China was again victorious, while the United States and the Netherlands switched places to ascend the podium with silver and bronze, respectively.

This was the second Summer Paralympic Games without standing volleyball events, which had been included from the introduction of volleyball in 1976 (when sitting volleyball was a demonstration event) through 2000.

== Medalists ==
Event	Gold	Silver	Bronze
Men's team	Iran (IRI) Davoud Alipourian; Sadegh Bigdeli; Saeid Ebrahimi; Jalil Imeri (captain); Mehdi Hamidzadeh; Nasser Hassanpour; Mohammad Hosseinifar; Mohammad Khaleghi; Reza Peidayesh; Mohammad Reza Rahimi; Ramezan Salehi (libero); Issa Zirahi; Coach: Hadi Rezaei	Bosnia and Herzegovina (BIH) Safet Alibašić; Sabahudin Delalić (captain); Mirzet Duran; Esad Durmišević; Ismet Godinjak; Dževad Hamzić; Ermin Jusufović; Hidaet Jusufović (libero); Zikret Mahmić; Adnan Manko; Asim Medić; Ejub Mehmedović; Coach: Mirza Hrustemović	Russia (RUS) Alexander Baychik; Tanatkan Bukin; Dmitriy Gordiyenko; Evgeny Kuzovnikov; Andrey Lavrinovich; Viktor Milenin; Sergey Uporov; Sergey Pozdeev; Alexander Savichev; Maksim Timchenko; Aleksei Volkov (libero); Sergey Yakunin (captain); Coach: Victor D'Yakov
Women's team	China (CHN) Li Liping; Liang Fen; Liu Lijuan; Lu Chunli; Lu Hongqin (captain); Sheng Yuhong; Tan Yanhua; Yang Yanling; Zhang Lijun; Zhang Xufei; Zheng Xiongying (libero); Zhong Haihong; Coach: Zhang Jun	United States (USA) Allison Aldrich; Heather Erickson; Alexandra Gouldie; Kathryn Holloway; SuGui Kriss; Kendra Lancaster; Hope Lewellen; Brenda Maymon (captain); Gina McWilliams; Nichole Millage; Kari Miller (libero); Lora Webster; Coach: Michael Hulett	Netherlands (NED) Sanne Bakker (libero); Karin van der Haar-Kramp; Karin Harmsen-Roosen; Paula List; Djoke van Marum; Elvira Stinissen; Josien Ten Thije-Voortman; Rika de Vries; Petra Westerhof (captain); Coach: John Bestebroer

== Classification ==
Classification is an important work for Paralympic athletes, after the classification, athletes can compete in a fair situation.
Athletes meeting the disability requirement can take part in this sport, but only 2 minimum requirements player can be on the team, and only 1 of them can be on the court.

== Qualification ==
There were 16 teams, 8 male and 8 female taking part in this sport.

=== Teams ===
==== Men ====
Bosnia and Herzegovina; Safet Alibasic; Sabahudin Delalic; Mirzet Duran; Esad Durmisevic; Ismet Godinjak; Dzevad Hamzic; Ermin Jusufovic; Hidaet Jusufovic; Zikret Mahmic; Adnan Manko; Asim Medic; Ejub Mehmedovic	Iraq; Saeed Al Mimar; Salah Al Shammari; Hussain Al Ugbi; Naser Alaibi; Ahmed Dahash; Muayad Hattab; Hadi Juboori; Majeed Kaabi; Mahdi Khayoon; Majeed Majeed; Abdulmunem Mohmmed; Ahmed Whailani	China; Gao Hui; Ding Xiaochao; Dou Wencheng; Huang Chunji; Li Ji; Li Lei; Li Mingfa; Tong Jiao; Wang Haidong; Wang Xiaolang; Zhang Zhongmin; Zhou Canming	Russia; Alexander Baychik; Tanatkan Bukin; Dimitriy Gordiyenko; Evgeny Kuzovnikov; Andreu Lavrinovich; Viktor Milenin; Sergey Pozdeev; Maksim Timchenko; Sergey Uporov; Alexey Volkov; Sergey Yakunin
Iran; Davoud Alipourian; Sadegh Bigdeli; Seyed Saeid Ebrahimi Baladezaei; Jalil Eimery; Mahdi Hamid Zageh; Naser Hassanpour Alinazari; Seyed Mohammad Hosseini Far; Mohammad Khaleghi; Reza Peidayesh; Mohammad Reza Rahimi; Ramzan Salehi Hajikolaei; Isa Zirahi	Egypt; Ashrad Zaghloul Abd Alla; Abd Elaal Mohamed Abd Elaal; Rezek Abd Ellatif; Abdel Nabi Hassan Abdel Latif; Mohamed Abouelyazeid; Taher Adel Elabahaey; Hesham Salah Elshwikh; Mohamed Abd Elhamed Emara; Salah Atta Hassanein; Hossam Massoud Massoud; El Saad Mossa; Ahmed Soliman	Japan; Shun Azuma; Satoshi Kanao; Susumu Kaneda; Tetsuo Minakawa; Kaname Nakayama; Susumu Takasago; Yoshihito Takeda; Tsutomu Tanabe; Koji Tanaka; Arata Yamamoto; Atsushi Yonezawa; Hitoshi Yoshida	Brazil; Wellington Anunciacao; Samuel Arantes; Giovani Freitas; Guilherme Gomes; Renato Leite; Rodrigo Mello; Wescley Oliveira; Diogo Rebolcas; Deivisson Santos; Claudio Silva; Daniel Silva; Gilberto Silva

==== Women ====
United States; Allison Aldrich; Heather Erickson; Alexandra Gouldie; Katie Holloway; Sugui Kriss; Kendra Lancaster; Hope Lewellen; Brenda Maymon; Gina McWilliams; Nichole Millage; Kari Miller; Lora Webster	China; Li Liping; Liang Fen; Liu Lijuan; Lu Chunli; Lu Hongqin; Sheng Yuhong; Tan Yanhua; Yang Yanling; Zhang Lijun; Zhang Xufei; Zheng Xiongying; Zhong Haihong	Lithuania; Malda Baumgarde; Liudmila Budiniene; Ruta Cvirkiene; Virginija Dmitrijeva; Rita Latauskaite; Karolina Lingyte; Neringa Susinskyte; Jolita Urbutiene; Jurate Verbuviene; Virginija Ziltye	Latvia; Inara Barkane; Una Dzalba; Ivonna Gailite; Oksana Gromova; Diana Ivanova; Olga Jegorova; Irina Jermolenko; Liga Karliete; Nellija Rusina; Linda Sila; Zanna Skutane
Netherlands; Sanne Bakker; Rika de Vries; Karin Harmsen-Roosen; Paula List; Elvira Stinissen; Josien Ten Thije-Voortman; Karin van der Haar-Kramp; Djoke van Marum; Petra Westerhof	Slovenia; Marinka Cencelj; Danica Gosnak; Emilie Gradisek; Bogomira Jakin; Ana Justin; Sasa Kotnik; Boza Kovacic; Suzana Ocepek; Alenka Sart; Stefaka Tomic; Anita Urnaut	Japan; Sachie Awano; Junko Fujii; Noriko Kaneda; Emi Kaneki; Yukari Okahira; Shiori Omura; Mamiko Osada; Yoko Saito; Haruni Sakamoto; Tomoko Sakamoto; Kiyoko Tomiya	Ukraine; Anzhelika Churkina; Oleksandra Granovska; Larysa Klochkova; Galyna Kuznetsova; Liubov Lomakina; Alla Lysenko; Inna Osetynska; Margaryta Pryvalykhina; Ilona Yudina

== Men's tournament ==
=== Preliminary round ===
==== Group A ====
Team	P	W	L	Sets	Points
Bosnia and Herzegovina (BIH)	3	3	0	9:1	6
Russia (RUS)	3	2	1	7:3	4
China (CHN)	3	1	2	3:6	2
Iraq (IRQ)	3	0	3	0:9	0

2008-09-07; 15:30	Bosnia and Herzegovina (BIH)	3–0	China (CHN)	China Agricultural University Gymnasium; Attendance: 1,800; Referees: Khaled Nasr Eld Elhelaly (Egypt)
2008-09-07; 15:30	(25–14, 25–22, 25–17)			China Agricultural University Gymnasium; Attendance: 1,800; Referees: Khaled Nasr Eld Elhelaly (Egypt)

2008-09-08; 11:50	Russia (RUS)	3–0	China (CHN)	China Agricultural University Gymnasium; Attendance: 2,000; Referees: France Marcoux (Canada)
2008-09-08; 11:50	(25–22, 25–22, 25–23)			China Agricultural University Gymnasium; Attendance: 2,000; Referees: France Marcoux (Canada)

2008-09-08; 19:30	Bosnia and Herzegovina (BIH)	3–0	Iraq (IRQ)	China Agricultural University Gymnasium; Attendance: 500; Referees: Jung Mal Soon (Korea)
2008-09-08; 19:30	(25–6, 25–14, 25–16)			China Agricultural University Gymnasium; Attendance: 500; Referees: Jung Mal Soon (Korea)

2008-09-09; 15:30	Iraq (IRQ)	0–3	Russia (RUS)	China Agricultural University Gymnasium; Attendance: 1,300; Referees: Joseph Campbell (United States)
2008-09-09; 15:30	(13–25, 8–25, 15–25)			China Agricultural University Gymnasium; Attendance: 1,300; Referees: Joseph Campbell (United States)

2008-09-10; 11:30	Russia (RUS)	1–3	Bosnia and Herzegovina (BIH)	China Agricultural University Gymnasium; Attendance: 400; Referees: Janko Plesnik (Slovenia)
2008-09-10; 11:30	(21–25, 22–25, 25–18, 16–25)			China Agricultural University Gymnasium; Attendance: 400; Referees: Janko Plesnik (Slovenia)

2008-09-10; 19:30	Iraq (IRQ)	0–3	China (CHN)	China Agricultural University Gymnasium; Attendance: 4,000; Referees: Ronaldo Tadeu Chaves (Brazil)
2008-09-10; 19:30	(9–25, 17–25, 12–25)			China Agricultural University Gymnasium; Attendance: 4,000; Referees: Ronaldo Tadeu Chaves (Brazil)

==== Group B ====
Team	P	W	L	Sets	Points
Iran (IRI)	3	3	0	9:0	6
Egypt (EGY)	3	2	1	6:3	4
Brazil (BRA)	3	1	2	3:6	2
Japan (JPN)	3	0	3	0:9	0

2008-09-07; 11:30	Iran (IRI)	3–0	Japan (JPN)	China Agricultural University Gymnasium; Attendance: 1,350; Referees: Matijn Meulenkamp (Netherlands)
2008-09-07; 11:30	(25–7, 25–7, 25–5)			China Agricultural University Gymnasium; Attendance: 1,350; Referees: Matijn Meulenkamp (Netherlands)

2008-09-07; 19:30	Egypt (EGY)	3–0	Brazil (BRA)	China Agricultural University Gymnasium; Attendance: 1,000; Referees: Anton Probst (Germany)
2008-09-07; 19:30	(25–8, 25–14, 25–17)			China Agricultural University Gymnasium; Attendance: 1,000; Referees: Anton Probst (Germany)

2008-09-08; 15:30	Iran (IRI)	3–0	Brazil (BRA)	China Agricultural University Gymnasium; Attendance: 1,000; Referees: Viktor Feldshteyn (Ukraine)
2008-09-08; 15:30	(25–9, 25–11, 25–8)			China Agricultural University Gymnasium; Attendance: 1,000; Referees: Viktor Feldshteyn (Ukraine)

2008-09-09; 11:35	Iran (IRI)	3–0	Egypt (EGY)	China Agricultural University Gymnasium; Attendance: 1,800; Referees: Khalid Salem Shanishah (Libya)
2008-09-09; 11:35	(27–25, 25–12, 25–18)			China Agricultural University Gymnasium; Attendance: 1,800; Referees: Khalid Salem Shanishah (Libya)

2008-09-09; 19:30	Brazil (BRA)	3–0	Japan (JPN)	China Agricultural University Gymnasium; Attendance: 1,000; Referees: An Qi (China)
2008-09-09; 19:30	(25–20, 25–17, 25–10)			China Agricultural University Gymnasium; Attendance: 1,000; Referees: An Qi (China)

2008-09-10; 15:30	Egypt (EGY)	3–0	Japan (JPN)	China Agricultural University Gymnasium; Attendance: 600; Referees: Xia Xin (China)
2008-09-10; 15:30	(25–8, 25–11, 25–15)			China Agricultural University Gymnasium; Attendance: 600; Referees: Xia Xin (China)

=== Final Round ===
Semifinals
A1	Bosnia and Herzegovina	3
B2	Egypt	0
B1	Iran	3
A2	Russia	0

Gold medal game
A1	Bosnia and Herzegovina	0
B1	Iran	3
Bronze medal game
B2	Egypt	2
A2	Russia	3

==== Semifinals ====
2008-09-12; 12:30	Bosnia and Herzegovina (BIH)	3–0	Egypt (EGY)	China Agricultural University Gymnasium; Attendance: 400; Referees: Anton Probst (Germany)
2008-09-12; 12:30	(25–18, 25–21, 25–20)			China Agricultural University Gymnasium; Attendance: 400; Referees: Anton Probst (Germany)

2008-09-12; 18:00	Iran (IRI)	3–0	Russia (RUS)	China Agricultural University Gymnasium; Attendance: 2,000; Referees: Gabor Karadi (Hungary)
2008-09-12; 18:00	(25–22, 25–13, 25–20)			China Agricultural University Gymnasium; Attendance: 2,000; Referees: Gabor Karadi (Hungary)

==== Bronze medal match ====
2008-09-15; 16:00	Egypt (EGY)	2–3	Russia (RUS)	China Agricultural University Gymnasium; Attendance: 2,400; Referees: Martijn Meulenkamp (Netherlands)
2008-09-15; 16:00	(25–22, 16–25, 25–19, 20–25, 9–15)			China Agricultural University Gymnasium; Attendance: 2,400; Referees: Martijn Meulenkamp (Netherlands)

==== Gold medal match ====
2008-09-15; 18:30	Bosnia and Herzegovina (BIH)	0–3	Iran (IRI)	China Agricultural University Gymnasium; Attendance: 2,000; Referees: Viktor Feldshteyn (Ukraine)
2008-09-15; 18:30	(22–25, 18–25, 22–25)			China Agricultural University Gymnasium; Attendance: 2,000; Referees: Viktor Feldshteyn (Ukraine)

=== 5-8 Classification ===
5-8 Semifinals
A3	China	3
B4	Japan	0
B3	Brazil	3
A4	Iraq	1

5-6 game
A3	China	3
B3	Brazil	1
7-8 game
B4	Japan	0
A4	Iraq	3

== Women's tournament ==
=== Preliminary round ===
==== Group A ====
Team	P	W	L	Sets	Points
Netherlands (NED)	3	9	3	9:3	6
Slovenia (SLO)	3	8	5	8:5	4
Ukraine (UKR)	3	5	6	5:6	2
Japan (JPN)	3	1	9	1:9	0

2008-09-07; 14:00	Japan (JPN)	0–3	Netherlands (NED)	China Agricultural University Gymnasium
2008-09-07; 14:00	(4–25, 21–25, 18–25)			China Agricultural University Gymnasium

2008-09-08; 9:00	Slovenia (SLO)	3-1	Japan (JPN)	China Agricultural University Gymnasium
2008-09-08; 9:00	(25–19, 21–25, 25–19, 25–9)			China Agricultural University Gymnasium

2008-09-08; 12:00	Ukraine (UKR)	1–3	Netherlands (NED)	China Agricultural University Gymnasium
2008-09-08; 12:00	(14–25, 25–23, 21–25, 19–25)			China Agricultural University Gymnasium

2008-09-09; 16:00	Slovenia (SLO)	3-1	Ukraine (UKR)	China Agricultural University Gymnasium
2008-09-09; 16:00	(11–25, 25–18, 25–17, 25–22)			China Agricultural University Gymnasium

2008-09-10; 12:00	Ukraine (UKR)	3-0	Japan (JPN)	China Agricultural University Gymnasium
2008-09-10; 12:00	(25–16, 25–14, 25–18)			China Agricultural University Gymnasium

2008-09-10; 16:00	Slovenia (SLO)	2–3	Netherlands (NED)	China Agricultural University Gymnasium
2008-09-10; 16:00	(25–23, 17–25, 16–25, 25–22, 11–15)			China Agricultural University Gymnasium

==== Group B ====
Team	P	W	L	Sets	Points
China (CHN)	3	9	0	9:0	6
United States (USA)	3	6	3	6:3	4
Lithuania (LTU)	3	3	4	3:4	2
Latvia (LAT)	3	1	9	1:9	0

2008-09-07; 9:00	Lithuania (LTU)	0–3	United States (USA)	China Agricultural University Gymnasium
2008-09-07; 9:00	(15–25, 18–25, 9–25)			China Agricultural University Gymnasium

2008-09-07; 21:00	Latvia (LAT)	0–3	China (CHN)	China Agricultural University Gymnasium
2008-09-07; 21:00	(4–25, 7–25, 16–25)			China Agricultural University Gymnasium

2008-09-08; 9:00	Lithuania (LTU)	0–3	China (CHN)	China Agricultural University Gymnasium
2008-09-08; 9:00	(18–25, 17–25, 14–25)			China Agricultural University Gymnasium

2008-09-09; 12:00	Latvia (LAT)	1–3	Lithuania (LTU)	China Agricultural University Gymnasium
2008-09-09; 12:00	(25–16, 16–25, 19–25, 19–25)			China Agricultural University Gymnasium

2008-09-09; 16:00	United States (USA)	0–3	China (CHN)	China Agricultural University Gymnasium
2008-09-09; 16:00	(14–25, 21–25, 19–25)			China Agricultural University Gymnasium

2008-09-10; 9:00	United States (USA)	3–0	Latvia (LAT)	China Agricultural University Gymnasium
2008-09-10; 9:00	(25–12, 25–17, 25–11)			China Agricultural University Gymnasium

=== Final Round ===
Semifinals
A1	Netherlands	2
B2	United States	3
B1	Slovenia	0
A2	China	3

Gold medal game
B2	United States	0
A2	China	3
Bronze medal game
A1	Netherlands	3
B1	Slovenia	0

==== Semifinals ====
2008-09-11; 12:00	Netherlands (NED)	2–3	United States (USA)	China Agricultural University Gymnasium
2008-09-11; 12:00	(25–19, 23–25, 26–28, 27–25, 10–15)			China Agricultural University Gymnasium

2008-09-11; 19:00	China (CHN)	0–3	Slovenia (SLO)	China Agricultural University Gymnasium
2008-09-11; 19:00	(25–21, 25–12, 25–19)			China Agricultural University Gymnasium

==== Bronze medal match ====
2008-09-14; 14:00	Slovenia (SLO)	0–3	Netherlands (NED)	China Agricultural University Gymnasium
2008-09-14; 14:00	(17–25, 16–25, 24–25)			China Agricultural University Gymnasium

==== Gold medal match ====
2008-09-14; 18:00	United States (USA)	0–3	China (CHN)	China Agricultural University Gymnasium
2008-09-14; 18:00	(17–25, 16–25, 24–26)			China Agricultural University Gymnasium

=== 5-8th Classification ===
5-8 Semifinals
A3	Ukraine	3
B4	Latvia	0
B3	Lithuania	3
A4	Japan	1

5-6 game
A3	Ukraine	3
B3	Lithuania	0
7-8 game
B4	Latvia	3
A4	Japan	2
