= Sanneke Vermeulen =

Dutch Paralympic judoka (born 1992)

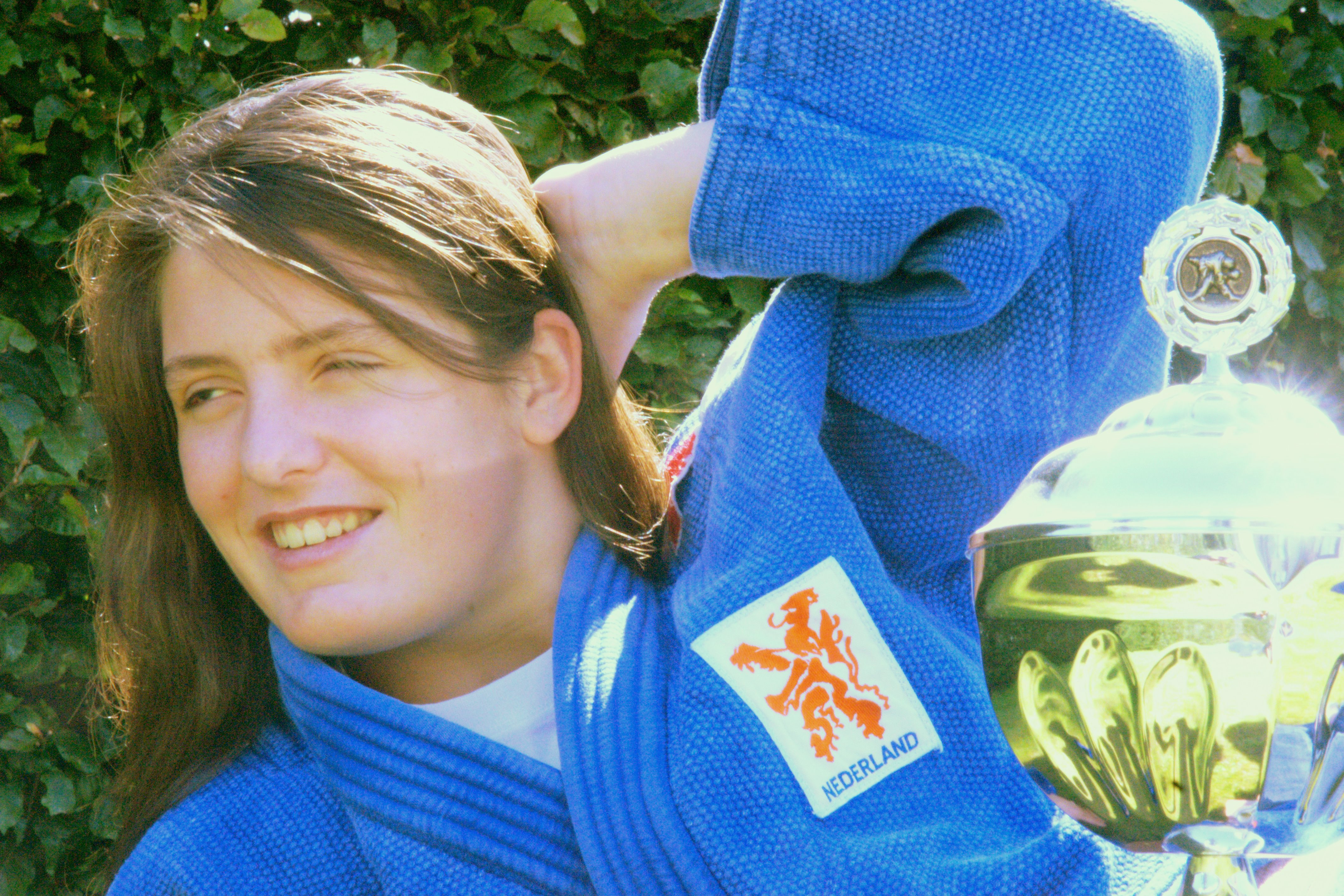
- Vermeulen in 2008

Personal information
- Born: 26 July 1992 (age 33)
- Occupation: Judoka

Sport
- Country: Netherlands
- Sport: Paralympic judo
Medal record
Paralympic Games
Bronze medal – third place	2008 Beijing	Women's 70 kg

Sanneke Vermeulen (born 26 July 1992) is a Dutch Paralympic judoka. She represented the Netherlands at the 2008 Summer Paralympics in Beijing, China and she won one of the bronze medals in the women's 70 kg event.

== Electoral history ==
Electoral history of Sanneke Vermeulen
Year	Body	Party	Pos.	Votes	Result		Ref.
Year	Body	Party	Pos.	Votes	Party seats	Individual	Ref.
2021	House of Representatives	People's Party for Freedom and Democracy	57	1,100	34	Lost	
