= Lori Daniels (volleyball) =

American Paralympic volleyball player

Personal information
- Nationality: American
- Hometown: Roanoke, Texas
- Height: 5 ft 4 in (1.63 m)
Medal record
Women's sitting volleyball
Representing United States
Paralympic Games
Bronze medal – third place	2004 Athens	Team

Lori Daniels is an American Paralympic volleyball player.

== Career ==
She won a bronze medal at the 2004 Summer Paralympics which were held in Athens, Greece.
