= Chen Yu Ping =

Chinese sitting volleyball player

Personal information
- Nationality: Chinese
Honours
Women's sitting volleyball
Representing China
Paralympic Games
Gold medal – first place	Athens, 2004	Team

Chen Yu Ping (Chinese: 陈玉萍; pinyin: Chén Yù píng) is a Chinese Paralympic sitting volleyball player. She is part of the China women's national sitting volleyball team.

She competed at the 2004 Paralympic Games.
