= Josien Ten Thije-Voortman =

Dutch sitting volleyball player (born 1959)

Josien Ten Thije

Personal information
- Full name: Josien Ten Thije-Voortman
- Nationality: Dutch
- Born: December 24, 1969 (age 56); Haaksbergen

National team
2008-	Netherlands sitting volleyball team
Honours
Women's sitting volleyball
Representing Netherlands
Paralympic Games
Silver medal – second place	2004 Athens	Team
Bronze medal – third place	2008 Beijing	Team

Josien Ten Thije-Voortman (born 24 December 1969 Haaksbergen) is a Dutch Paralympic sitting volleyball player. She is part of the Netherlands women's national sitting volleyball team.

She competed at the 2004 Summer Paralympics, 2008 Summer Paralympics finishing third, and at the 2012 Summer Paralympics, finishing 4th, after losing from Ukraine in the bronze medal match.

== See also ==
- Netherlands at the 2012 Summer Paralympics
