= Karin van der Haar-Kramp =

Dutch sitting volleyball player (born 1977)

Personal information
- Nationality: Dutch
- Born: 9 May 1977 (age 49)

Volleyball information
- Number: 5

Career
Years	Teams
2012	(Netherlands) Sudosa/SC Bartje

National team
2008-2012	Netherlands sitting volleyball team
Honours
Women's sitting volleyball
Representing Netherlands
Paralympic Games
Bronze medal – third place	2008 Beijing	Team

Karin van der Haar-Kramp (born 9 May 1977) is a Dutch female Paralympic sitting volleyball player. She is part of the Netherlands women's national sitting volleyball team.

She competed at the 2008 Summer Paralympics finishing third, and 2012 Summer Paralympics finishing 4th, after losing from Ukraine in the bronze medal match.

On club level she played for Sudosa/SC Bartje in 2012.

== See also ==
- Netherlands at the 2012 Summer Paralympics
