= Lijuan Yuan =

Chinese-American virologist and academic researcher

- 袁丽娟
- Citizenship: Chinese-American
- Education: Beijing University (Diploma); Capital Institute of Pediatrics, Beijing (M.S.); The Ohio State University (Ph.D.)
- Known for: Gnotobiotic pig models for rotavirus and norovirus research; mucosal immunology of enteric viruses; preclinical vaccine evaluation
- Scientific career
- Fields: Virology, Mucosal immunology, Vaccinology, Enteric virology
- Workplaces: Virginia Polytechnic Institute and State University
- Doctoral advisor: Linda J. Saif

Lijuan Yuan (袁丽娟) is a Chinese-American virologist and academic researcher. She is a Professor of Virology in the Department of Biomedical Sciences and Pathobiology at the Virginia–Maryland College of Veterinary Medicine, Virginia Polytechnic Institute and State University (Virginia Tech). She also holds appointment as Professor of Virology with the Faculty of Health Sciences for the Translational Biology, Medicine, and Health (TBMH) Program at Virginia Tech. She is known for her contributions to mucosal immunology, human enteric viral disease research, and preclinical evaluation of human rotavirus and norovirus vaccines using gnotobiotic pig models.

== Education ==
Yuan received her Ph.D. in immunology and virology in 2000 from Ohio Agricultural Research and Development Center, The Ohio State University, under Linda J. Saif. She completed an M.S. in Beijing and diplomas from Peking University and a Beijing health school.

== Career ==
Yuan worked at The Ohio State University from 2002 to 2007, before joining Virginia Tech in 2007, where she was promoted to Associate Professor in 2013 and Professor of Virology in 2019, with a concurrent appointment in its Translational Biology, Medicine, and Health program since 2014.

== Research ==
Yuan's research activities include host–pathogen interactions in enteric viruses, examining viral infectivity, pathogenesis, and immune responses, and developing intervention strategies including vaccines, prophylactics, therapeutics, probiotics, and prebiotics. Her laboratory focuses on the use of gnotobiotic pig models to study human rotavirus and norovirus infections, evaluating vaccine immunogenicity, protective efficacy, and novel immunization routes.

== Honors and awards ==
- Grant Turnwald Innovation Award, Virginia–Maryland College of Veterinary Medicine (2020–2021)
- GADOR Foundation Award for research on nanobodies with neutralizing activity against SARS-CoV-2
- Elected Council Member, U.S. Association for Gnotobiotics (2019–2022)
- Pfizer Award for Research Excellence (2011)
- American Society for Microbiology International Professorship Award for Asia (2009)
- Elected membership in Phi Zeta National Honor Society of Veterinary Medicine (inducted 2000)
- Presidential Fellowship, The Ohio State University (1999–2000)
- Elected membership in Phi Kappa Phi National Honor Society (inducted 1998)
