= Rika de Vries =

Dutch sitting volleyball player (born 1974)

Personal information
- Nationality: Dutch
- Born: 29 December 1974 (age 51)

Volleyball information
- Number: 4

Career
Years	Teams
2008-2012 (?)	(Netherlands) Kindercentrum/Alterno

National team
2012	Netherlands sitting volleyball team
Honours
Women's sitting volleyball
Representing Netherlands
Paralympic Games
Bronze medal – third place	2008 Beijing	Team

Rika de Vries (born 29 December 1974) is a Dutch female Paralympic sitting volleyball player. She is part of the Netherlands women's national sitting volleyball team.

She competed at the 2008 Summer Paralympics finishing third, and also at the 2012 Summer Paralympics finishing 4th, after losing to Ukraine in the bronze medal match. On club level, she played for Kindercentrum/Alterno in 2012.

== See also ==
- Netherlands at the 2012 Summer Paralympics
