= Petra Westerhof =

Dutch sitting volleyball player (born 1969)

Personal information
- Nationality: Dutch
- Born: 27 June 1969 (age 57)

Volleyball information
- Number: 8

National team
2008–	Netherlands sitting volleyball team
Honours
Women's sitting volleyball
Representing Netherlands
Paralympic Games
Silver medal – second place	2004 Athens	Team
Bronze medal – third place	2008 Beijing	Team

Petra Westerhof (born 27 June 1969) is a Dutch female Paralympic sitting volleyball player. She is part of the Netherlands women's national sitting volleyball team.

She competed at the 2004 Summer Paralympics finishing second, and 2008 Summer Paralympics finishing third,
