= Elvira Stinissen =

Dutch sitting volleyball player (born 1979)

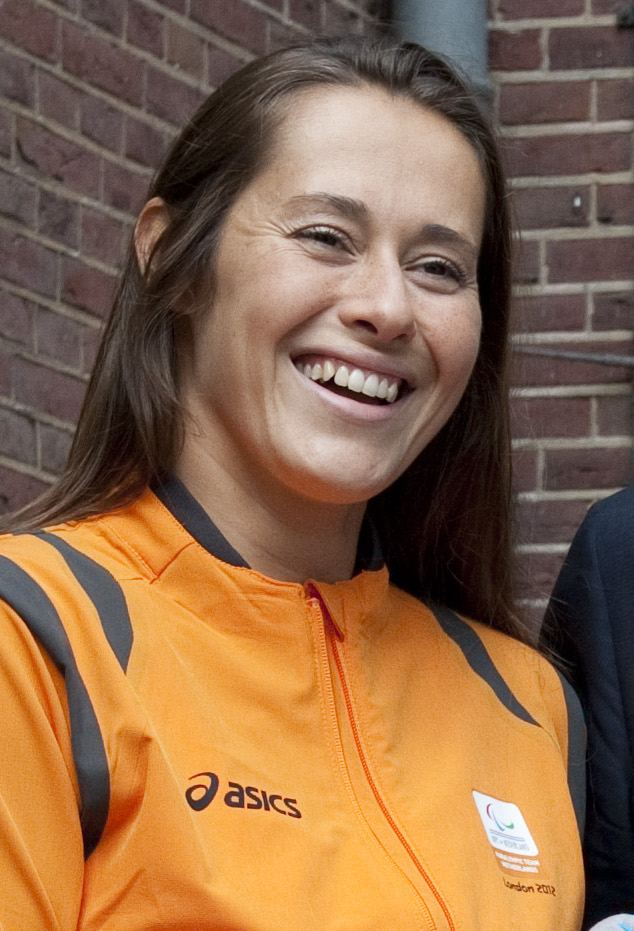

Personal information
- Nationality: Dutch
- Born: 26 March 1979 (age 47)

National team
2008-	Netherlands sitting volleyball team
Honours
Women's sitting volleyball
Representing Netherlands
Paralympic Games
Bronze medal – third place	2008 Beijing	Team

Elvira Stinissen (born 26 March 1979) is a Dutch Paralympic sitting volleyball player. She is part of the Netherlands women's national sitting volleyball team.

She competed at the 2008 Summer Paralympics finishing third, 2012 Summer Paralympics, and 2016 Summer Paralympics.

She was on the International Paralympic Committee, Athletes’ Council.
