= China Agricultural University Gymnasium =

Sports venue in Beijing, China

Coordinates: 40°0′9″N 116°21′11″E

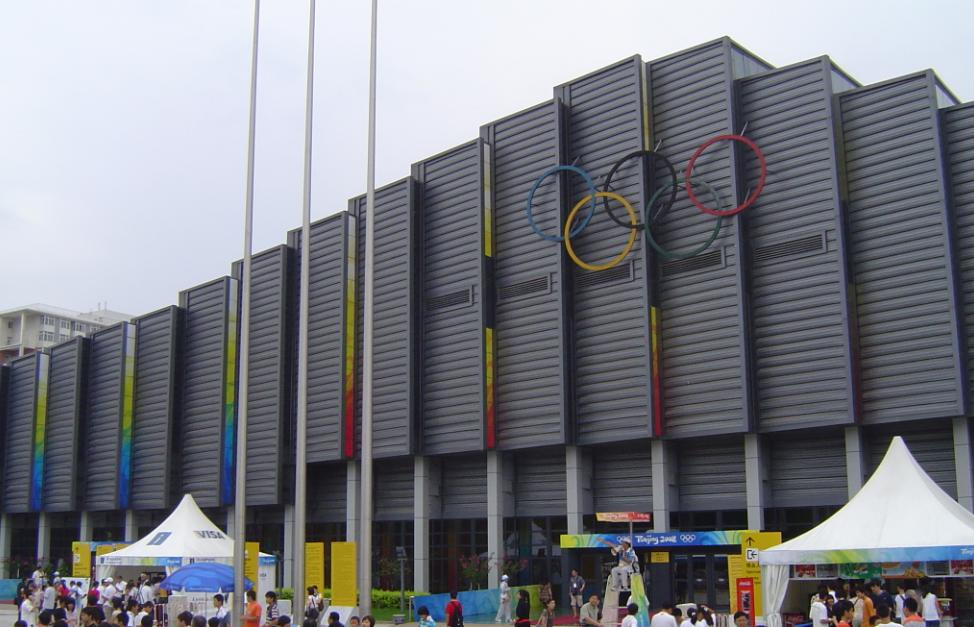
- The indoor arena at the 2008 Summer Olympics.
- Interactive map of China Agricultural University Gymnasium
- Location: China Agricultural University
- Owner: China Agricultural University
- Capacity: 6,000

Construction
- Opened: 2007
- Architect: South China University of Technology Institute of Architectural Design

Tenant
- China Agricultural University

The China Agricultural University Gymnasium (simplified Chinese: 中国农业大学体育馆; traditional Chinese: 中國農業大學體育館; pinyin: Zhōngguó Nóngyè Dàxué Tǐyùguǎn) is an indoor arena located on the campus of the China Agricultural University in Beijing. It hosted the wrestling events of the 2008 Summer Olympics. The Gymnasium's rooftop has a staggered, stair-like design.

It covers an area of 23,950 square metres and has a capacity of 8,200 which was reduced to 6,000 after the events. It was also turned into a sports complex for students of the China Agricultural University after the Olympic Games. Construction started the first half of 2005 and was completed in July 2007.
