= Liu Lijuan (sitting volleyball) =

Chinese sitting volleyball player

Personal information
- Nationality: Chinese
Honours
Women's sitting volleyball
Representing China
Paralympic Games
Gold medal – first place	2008 Beijing	Team

Liu Lijuan (born 15 June 1984) is a Chinese female Paralympic sitting volleyball player. She is part of the China women's national sitting volleyball team.

She competed at the 2008 Summer Paralympics winning the gold medal.

== See also ==
- China at the 2008 Summer Paralympics
