= Djoke van Marum =

Dutch volleyball player (born 1959)

Personal information
- Nationality: Dutch
- Born: 22 September 1959 (age 67)

National team
2008-	Netherlands sitting volleyball team
Honours
Women's sitting volleyball
Representing Netherlands
Paralympic Games
Bronze medal – third place	2008 Beijing	Team

Djoke van Marum (born 22 September 1959) is a Dutch female Paralympic sitting volleyball player. She is part of the Netherlands women's national sitting volleyball team.

She competed at the 2008 Summer Paralympics finishing third,
