= Karin Harmsen-Roosen =

Dutch Paralympic volleyball player (born 1962)

Personal information
- Nationality: Dutch
- Born: 11 March 1962 (age 64)

Career
| Years | Teams |
|---|---|
| 2008 | (Netherlands) Allvo |

National team
| 2004- | Netherlands sitting volleyball team |

Karin Harmsen-Roosen (born 11 March 1962) is a Dutch female Paralympic sitting volleyball player. She is part of the Netherlands women's national sitting volleyball team.

She competed at the 2008 Summer Paralympics finishing third,
