= Paula List =

Dutch sitting volleyball player (born 1972)

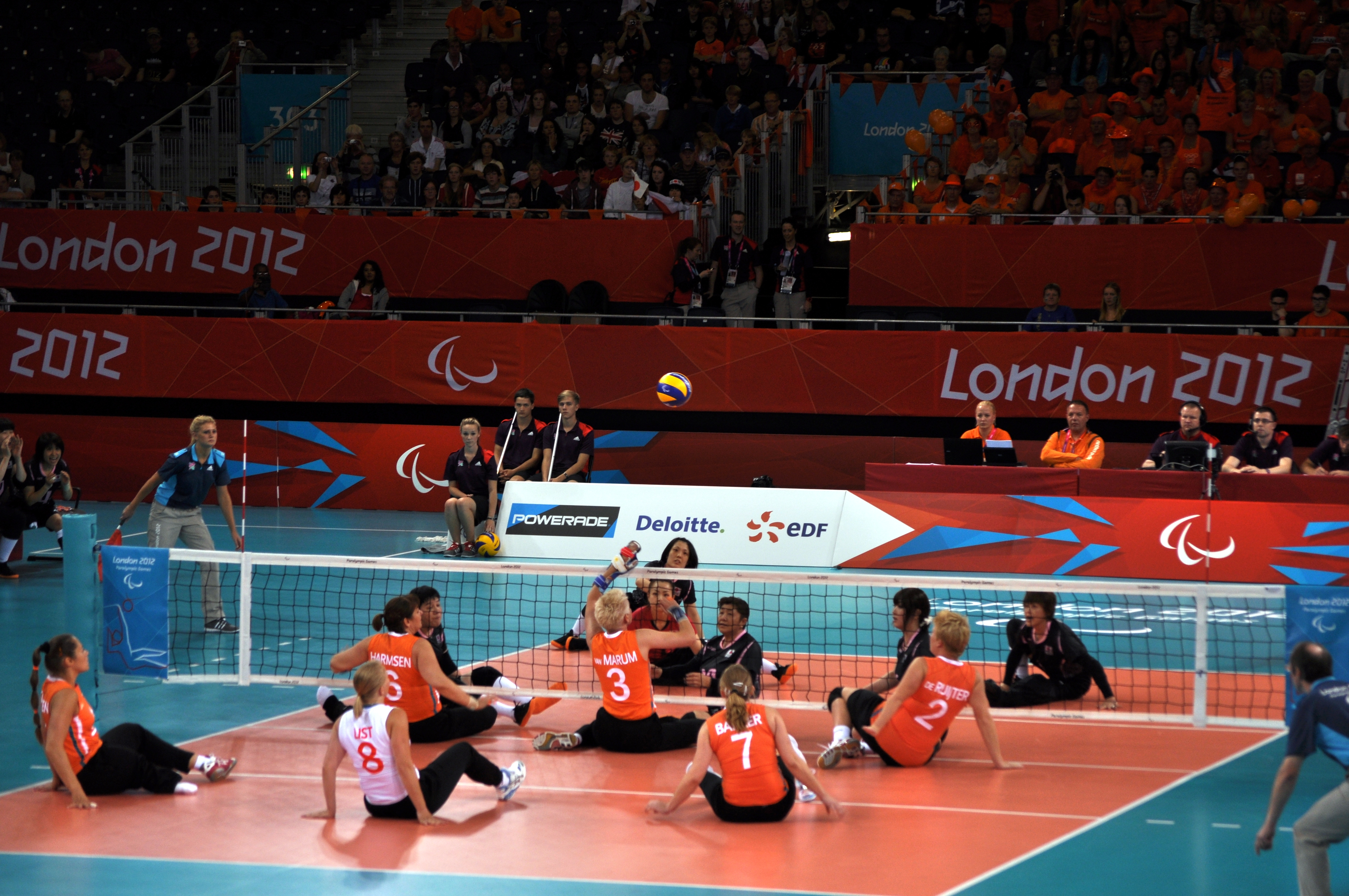
- List (#8) at the 2012 Summer Paralympics

Personal information
- Full name: Paula List-Talman
- Nationality: Dutch
- Born: 16 August 1972 (age 54)

Volleyball information
- Number: 8

Career
Years	Teams
2012	(Netherlands) Allvo

National team
2004-	Netherlands sitting volleyball team
Honours
Women's sitting volleyball
Representing Netherlands
Paralympic Games
Bronze medal – third place	2008 Beijing	Team

Paula List (born 16 August 1972) is a Dutch female Paralympic sitting volleyball player. She is part of the Netherlands women's national sitting volleyball team.

She competed at the 2008 Summer Paralympics finishing third, and 2012 Summer Paralympics finishing 4th, after losing from Ukraine in the bronze medal match. On club level she played for Allvo in 2012.

== See also ==
- Netherlands at the 2012 Summer Paralympics
