= Cycling at the 2008 Summer Paralympics – Men's individual pursuit =

The Men's individual pursuit at the 2008 Summer Paralympics took place on September 7–9 at the Laoshan Velodrome.

== Classification ==
The cyclists are given a classification depending on the type and extent of their disability. The classification system allows cyclists to compete against others with a similar level of function.

Cycling classes:

- B&VI 1–3: Blind and visually impaired cyclists
- LC 1–4: Cyclists with a locomotor disability
- CP 1–4: Cyclists with cerebral palsy

== B&VI 1–3 ==
The men's individual pursuit (B&VI 1–3) took place on September 7.

Gold	Silver	Bronze
Australia (AUS)	Spain (ESP)	Australia (AUS)
Kieran Modra; Tyson Lawrence	Christian Venge; David Llaurado	Bryce Lindores; Steven George

=== Preliminaries ===
Q = Qualifier WR = World Record

Rank	Name	Time
1	Kieran Modra (AUS); Pilot: Tyson Lawrence (AUS)	4:18.961 Q WR
2	Christian Venge (ESP); Pilot: David Llaurado (ESP)	4:25.335 Q
3	Daniel Chalifour (CAN); Pilot: Alexandre Cloutier (CAN)	4:25.554 Q
4	Bryce Lindores (AUS); Pilot: Steven George (AUS)	4:27.578 Q
5	Brian Cowie (CAN); Pilot: Devon Smibert (CAN)	4:29.195
6	Gavin Kilpatrick (RSA); Pilot: Michael Thomson (RSA)	4:32.191
7	Vladislav Janovjak (SVK); Pilot: Robert Mitosinka (SVK)	4:32.236
8	Francisco González (ESP); Pilot: Juan Francisco Suarez (ESP)	4:38.548
9	Alfred Stelleman (NED); Pilot: Jaco Tettelaar (NED)	4:40.432
10	Stephane Cote (CAN); Pilot: Pierre-Olivier Boily (CAN)	4:41.677
11	Olivier Donval (FRA); Pilot: John Saccomandi (FRA)	4:44.890
12	Carlos Arciniegas (COL); Pilot: Juan Carreno (COL)	4:47.730
13	Michael Delaney (IRL); Pilot: David Patrick Peelo (IRL)	4:49.911
14	Arnold Csaba Butu (ROU); Pilot: Lehel Rusza (ROU)	5:11.936

== CP 3 ==
The men's individual pursuit (CP 3) took place on 7 September. The pre-event favorite to win the gold medal was reigning champion, Darren Kenny of Great Britain.

Gold	Silver	Bronze
Darren Kenny; Great Britain	Yong-Sik Jin; South Korea	Jean Quevillon; Canada

=== Preliminaries ===
Q = Qualifier WR = World Record

Rank	Name	Time
1	Darren Kenny (GBR)	3:36.875 Q WR
2	Yong-Sik Jin (KOR)	3:58.817 Q
3	Jean Quevillon (CAN)	4:03.730 Q
4	Maurice Eckhard (FRA)	4:09.119 Q
5	Tomas Kvasnicka (CZE)	4:11.715
6	Rodrigo Lopez (ARG)	4:13.850
7	Brayden McDougall (CAN)	4:15.006
	Javier Ochoa (ESP)	Disqualified

== CP 4 ==
The men's individual pursuit (CP 4) took place on 7 September.

Gold	Silver	Bronze
Christopher Scott; Australia	Masashi Ishii; Japan	Cesar Neira; Spain

=== Preliminaries ===
Q = Qualifier

Rank	Name	Time
1	Masashi Ishi (JPN)	3:37.848 Q
2	Christopher Scott (AUS)	3:38.205 Q
3	Jiri Bouska (CZE)	3:45.269 Q
4	Cesar Neira (ESP)	3:45.322 Q
5	Klaus Lungershausen (GER)	3:52.561
6	Lubos Jirka (CZE)	3:53.566
7	Enda Smyth (IRL)	3:55.919
8	Janos Plekker (RSA)	3:55.933
9	Michael Farrell (USA)	4:04.606

== LC 1 ==
The men's individual pursuit (LC 1) took place on 8 September.

Gold	Silver	Bronze
Michael Gallagher; Australia	Wolfgang Sacher; Germany	Fabio Triboli; Italy

=== Preliminaries ===
Q = Qualifier

Rank	Name	Time
1	Michael Gallagher (AUS)	4:40.6 Q
2	Wolfgang Sacher (GER)	+ 0.03.8 Q
3	Fabio Triboli (ITA)	+ 0.06.3 Q
4	Soelito Gohr (BRA)	+ 0.09.5 Q
5	Cathal Gustavus Miller (IRL)	+ 0.13.4
6	Manfred Gattringer (AUT)	+ 0.14.1
7	Pierpaolo Addesi (ITA)	+ 0.17.6
8	Wolfgang Eibeck (AUT)	+ 0.18.3
9	Ivan Renggli (SUI)	+ 0.26.3
10	David Mercier (FRA)	+ 0.28.0
11	Damien Severi (FRA)	+ 0.30.0
12	Mark Breton (CAN)	+ 0.31.8
13	Kuidong Zhang (CHN)	+ 0.32.1
14	Kennedy Jacome (COL)	+ 0.36.3
15	Ioannis Kalaitzakis (GRE)	+ 0.39.4

== LC 2 ==
The men's individual pursuit (LC 2) took place on 8 September.

Gold	Silver	Bronze
Jiří Ježek; Czech Republic	Roberto Alcaide; Spain	Jan Boyen; Belgium

=== Preliminaries ===
Q = Qualifier

Rank	Name	Time
1	Jiří Ježek (CZE)	4.45.3
2	Roberto Alcaide (ESP)	+ 0.06.2
3	Jan Boyen (BEL)	+ 0.11.0
4	Carol-Eduard Novak (ROU)	+ 0.12.5
5	Eric Bourgault (CAN)	+ 0.24.2
6	Yuanchao Zheng (CHN)	+ 0.28.1
7	Luis Chacon (COL)	+ 0.29.8
8	Morten Jahr (NOR)	+ 0.38.6
9	Amador Granado (ESP)	+ 1.04.2
10	David Kuster (SLO)	+ 1.05.1

== LC 3 ==
The men's individual pursuit (LC 3) took place on 9 September.

Gold	Silver	Bronze
Simon Richardson; Great Britain	Masaki Fujita; Japan	Tobias Graf; Germany

=== Preliminaries ===
Q = Qualifier WR = World Record

Rank	Name	Time
1	Simon Richardson (GBR)	3.48.18 Q WR
2	Masaki Fujita (JPN)	3.52.25 Q
3	Tobias Graf (GER)	3.54.54 Q
4	Laurent Thirionet (FRA)	3.57.23 Q
5	Fabrizio Macchi (ITA)	4.00.40
6	Antonio Garcia (ESP)	4.00.70
7	Erich Stauffer (AUT)	4.06.17
8	Michael Milton (AUS)	4.10.44
9	Stéphane Bahier (FRA)	4.12.02
10	Zhang Lu (CHN)	4.21.75
DSQ	Flaviano Carvalho (BRA)	1.28.70

== LC 4 ==
The men's individual pursuit (LC 4) took place on 9 September.

Gold	Silver	Bronze
Paolo Vigano; Italy	Michael Teuber; Germany	Juan José Méndez Fernández; Spain

=== Preliminaries ===
Q = Qualifier WR = World Record

Rank	Name	Time
1	Paolo Vigano (ITA)	3.59.74 Q WR
2	Michael Teuber (GER)	4.05.93 Q
3	Juan José Méndez Fernández (ESP)	4.16.69 Q
4	Erich Winkler (GER)	4.17.74 Q
5	Pierre Senska (GER)	4.25.25
6	Anthony Zahn (USA)	4.27.05
7	Wolfgang Dabernig (AUT)	4.40.61
DNS	Alexander Hohlrieder (AUT)	
