= Cycling at the 2008 Summer Paralympics – Men's road time trial =

The Men's individual time trial events at the 2008 Summer Paralympics took place on September 12 at the Changping Triathlon Venue.

== Handcycle classes ==
=== HC A ===
The Men's individual time trial HC A event took place at 10:32.

Gold	Silver	Bronze
Wolfgang Schattauer; Austria	Rastislav Turecek; Slovakia	Alain Quittet; France

Rank	Name	Time	Time behind	Avg. speed
1	Wolfgang Schattauer (AUT)	29:57.77		25.431
2	Rastislav Turecek (SVK)	30:53.09	+55.32	
3	Alain Quittet (FRA)	31:17.72	+1:19.95	
4	Torben Broer (GER)	35:02.87	+5:05.10	
5	Yvon Buchmann (FRA)	37:51.29	+7:53.52	
6	Christoph Etzlstorfer (AUT)	40:40.36	+10:42.59	
7	Edgar Navarro (MEX)	46:16.11	+16:18.34	

=== HC B ===
The Men's individual time trial HC B event took place at 10:15.

Gold	Silver	Bronze
Heinz Frei; Switzerland	Vittorio Podesta; Italy	Edward Maalouf; Lebanon

Rank	Name	Time	Time behind	Avg. speed
1	Heinz Frei (SUI)	22:06.23		34.473
2	Vittorio Podesta (ITA)	22:12.06	+5.83	
3	Edward Maalouf (LIB)	22:12.91	+6.68	
4	Stefan Baumann (GER)	22:44.21	+37.98	
5	Manfred Putz (AUT)	22:44.88	+38.65	
6	Lukas Weber (SUI)	22:50.12	+43.89	
7	Max Weber (GER)	23:08.88	+1:02.65	
8	Tobias Knecht (GER)	23:08.91	+1:02.68	
9	Rico Morneau (CAN)	23:36.24	+1:30.01	
10	Mark Beggs (CAN)	23:41.60	+1:35.37	
11	Radovan Civis (CZE)	23:46.53	+1:40.30	
12	Marcel Pipek (CZE)	24:12.99	+2:06.76	
13	Matt Updike (USA)	24:39.59	+2:33.36	
14	David Lee (USA)	25:04.99	+2:58.76	
15	Cho Hang-duk (KOR)	25:50.09	+3:43.86	

=== HC C ===
The Men's individual time trial HC C event took place at 10:00.

Gold	Silver	Bronze
Oz Sanchez; United States	Jose Vicente Arzo; Spain	Alejandro Albor; United States

Rank	Name	Time	Time behind	Avg. speed
1	Oz Sanchez (USA)	20:16.52		37.582
2	Jose Vicente Arzo (ESP)	20:36.91	+20.39	
3	Alejandro Albor (USA)	20:59.49	+42.97	
4	Ernst van Dyk (RSA)	21:01.59	+45.07	
5	Norbert Mosandl (GER)	21:33.09	+1:16.57	
6	Franz Nietlispach (SUI)	21:53.12	+1:36.60	
7	Norbert Koch (GER)	21:59.90	+1:43.38	
8	Don van der Linden (NED)	22:31.28	+2:14.76	
9	Elmar Sternath (AUT)	24:33.70	+4:17.18	
10	Peter Lorkowski (LUX)	25:05.34	+4:48.82	
11	Lassane Gasbeogo (BUR)	25:21.79	+5:05.27	
	Nati Groberg (ISR)	DNS		

== Cerebral palsy classes ==
=== CP 3 ===
The Men's individual time trial CP 3 event took place at 11:16.

Gold	Silver	Bronze
Javier Ochoa; Spain	Darren Kenny; Great Britain	Jin Yong-sik; South Korea

Rank	Name	Time	Time behind	Avg. speed
1	Javier Ochoa (ESP)	37:26.47		39.742
2	Darren Kenny (GBR)	37:38.42	+11.95	
3	Jin Yong-sik (KOR)	38:45.83	+1:19.36	
4	Maurice Far Eckhard (ESP)	38:47.82	+1:21.35	
5	Jean Quevillon (CAN)	41:52.97	+4:26.50	
6	Tomas Kvasnicka (CZE)	42:36.23	+5:09.76	
7	Augusto Pereira (POR)	43:43.02	+6:16.55	
8	Rodrigo López (ARG)	43:56.42	+6:29.95	
	Brayden McDougall (CAN)	DNF		

=== CP 4 ===
The Men's individual time trial CP 4 event took place at 11:27.

Gold	Silver	Bronze
Cesar Neira; Spain	Christopher Scott; Australia	Masashi Ishii; Japan

Rank	Name	Time	Time behind	Avg. speed
1	Cesar Neira (ESP)	35:53.98		41.448
2	Christopher Scott (AUS)	35:55.99	+2.01	
3	Masashi Ishii (JPN)	36:10.20	+16.22	
4	Jiri Bouska (CZE)	36:18.49	+24.51	
5	Klaus Lungershausen (GER)	36:52.33	+58.35	
6	Lubos Jirka (CZE)	37:25.57	+1:31.59	
7	Michael Farrell (USA)	38:14.76	+2:20.78	
8	Janos Plekker (RSA)	38:43.17	+2:49.19	
9	Enda Smyth (IRL)	41:24.28	+5:30.30	

== Locomotor disability classes ==
=== LC 1 ===
The Men's individual time trial LC 1 event took place at 14:00.

Gold	Silver	Bronze
Wolfgang Sacher; Germany	Wolfgang Eibeck; Austria	Fabio Triboli; Italy

Rank	Name	Time	Time behind	Avg. speed
1	Wolfgang Sacher (GER)	34:41.62		42.889
2	Wolfgang Eibeck (AUT)	34:52.20	+10.58	
3	Fabio Triboli (ITA)	35:23.70	+42.08	
4	Ivan Renggli (SUI)	35:25.66	+44.04	
5	Michael Gallagher (AUS)	35:29.74	+48.12	
6	Soelito Gohr (BRA)	35:50.02	+1:08.40	
7	David Mercier (FRA)	36:13.31	+1:31.69	
8	Manfred Gattringer (AUT)	36:26.50	+1:44.88	
9	Cathal Gustavus Miller (IRL)	36:33.95	+1:52.33	
10	Pierpaolo Addesi (ITA)	36:49.94	+2:08.32	
11	Mark Breton (CAN)	38:15.21	+3:33.59	
12	Patrik Chlebo (SVK)	38:19.29	+3:37.67	
13	Damien Severi (FRA)	38:32.86	+3:51.24	
14	Kennedy Jacome (COL)	39:09.37	+4:27.75	
15	Zhang Kuidong (CHN)	41:10.95	+6:29.33	
16	Ioannis Kalaitzakis (GRE)	41:13.72	+6:32.10	

Note: Rider # 29 add nine seconds to his time for starting in the wrong side

=== LC 2 ===
The Men's individual time trial LC 2 event took place at 14:18.

Gold	Silver	Bronze
Jiří Ježek; Czech Republic	Carol Eduard Novak; Romania	Roberto Alcaide; Spain

Rank	Name	Time	Time behind	Avg. speed
1	Jiří Ježek (CZE)	33:36.70		44.270
2	Carol Eduard Novak (ROU)	34:04.60	+27.90	
3	Roberto Alcaide (ESP)	34:18.86	+42.16	
4	Jan Boyen (BEL)	35:39.55	+2:02.85	
5	Ron Williams (USA)	36:12.84	+2:36.14	
6	Luis Chacon (COL)	36:56.74	+3:20.04	
7	Morten Jahr (NOR)	37:53.80	+4:17.10	
8	Zheng Yuanchao (CHN)	38:30.72	+4:54.02	
9	Eric Bourgault (CAN)	38:58.26	+5:21.56	
10	Tomislav Zadro (CRO)	39:42.59	+6:05.89	
11	David Kuster (SLO)	42:53.77	+9:17.07	

=== LC 3 ===
The Men's individual time trial LC 3 event took place at 14:31.

Gold	Silver	Bronze
Laurent Thirionet; France	Simon Richardson; Great Britain	Masaki Fujita; Japan

Rank	Name	Time	Time behind	Avg. speed
1	Laurent Thirionet (FRA)	38:00.31		39.152
2	Simon Richardson (GBR)	38:23.73	+23.42	
3	Masaki Fujita (JPN)	38:38.96	+38.65	
4	Antonio García (ESP)	38:48.66	+48.35	
5	Tobias Graf (GER)	38:55.25	+54.94	
6	Stéphane Bahier (FRA)	39:13.55	+1:13.24	
7	Fabrizio Macchi (ITA)	39:38.98	+1:38.67	
8	Cirio Molina (VEN)	40:02.48	+2:02.17	
9	Flaviano Carvalho (BRA)	40:44.90	+2:44.59	
10	Erich Stauffer (AUT)	41:00.76	+3:00.45	
11	Zhang Lu (CHN)	44:02.83	+6:02.52	

=== LC 4 ===
The Men's individual time trial LC 4 event took place at 14:46.

Gold	Silver	Bronze
Michael Teuber; Germany	Juan José Méndez Fernández; Spain	Anthony Zahn; United States

Rank	Name	Time	Time behind	Avg. speed
1	Michael Teuber (GER)	38:46.79		38.370
2	Juan José Méndez Fernández (ESP)	39:54.68	+1:07.89	
3	Anthony Zahn (USA)	41:08.21	+2:21.42	
4	Alexander Hohlrieder (AUT)	41:20.07	+2:33.28	
5	Erich Winkler (GER)	42:42.91	+3:56.12	
6	Pierre Senska (GER)	44:18.16	+5:31.37	
7	Wolfgang Dabernig (AUT)	47:57.44	+9:10.65	
	Paolo Vigano (ITA)	DNF		

== Blind & visually impaired class ==
=== B&VI 1-3 ===
The Men's individual time trial B&VI 1-3 event took place at 15:31.

Gold	Silver	Bronze
Venge/Llaurado; Spain	Stelleman/Tettelaar; Netherlands	Kosikowski/Korc; Poland

Rank	Name	Time	Time behind	Avg. speed
1	Venge/Llaurado (ESP)	32:01.12		46.472
2	Stelleman/Tettelaar (NED)	32:28.15	+27.03	
3	Kosikowski/Korc (POL)	32:50.31	+49.19	
4	Janovjak/Mitosinka (SVK)	32:57.06	+55.94	
5	Modra/Lawrence (AUS)	33:03.24	+1:02.12	
6	Gonzalez/Suarez (ESP)	33:09.09	+1:07.97	
7	Donval/Saccomandi (FRA)	33:26.83	+1:25.71	
8	Shaptsiaboi/Piutsevich (BLR)	33:30.42	+1:29.30	
9	Ollanketo/Tormanen (FIN)	33:36.96	+1:35.84	
10	Zajac/Flak (POL)	33:37.42	+1:36.30	
11	Chalifour/Cloutier (CAN)	33:41.84	+1:40.72	
12	Eymard/Godimus (BEL)	33:58.30	+1:57.18	
13	Cote/Boily (CAN)	35:03.26	+3:02.14	
14	Oshiro/Takahashi (JPN)	35:10.00	+3:08.88	
15	Cowie/Smibert (CAN)	35:10.72	+3:09.60	
16	Arciniegas/Carreno (COL)	36:08.97	+4:07.85	
17	Kilpatrick/Thomson (RSA)	36:24.91	+4:23.79	
18	Delaney/Peelo (IRL)	36:26.54	+4:25.42	
19	Madsen/Soerensen (DEN)	37:24.10	+5:22.98	
20	Butu/Ruzsa (ROU)	37:26.38	+5:25.26	
