= Cycling at the 2004 Summer Paralympics – Men's individual pursuit =

Men's Individual Pursuit at the XII Paralympic Games
- Paralympic Cycling (track)
- Venue: Olympic Velodrome
- Dates: 18–20 September 2004
- Competitors: 76 from 23 nations

Men's individual pursuit track cycling events at the 2004 Summer Paralympics were competed from 18 to 20 September at the Olympic Velodrome.

There were seven events. Each class began with races to set qualification times. In most classes the 8 fastest qualifiers then competed in 4 pursuit heats, with the two fastest winners proceeding to the gold medal race, and the two slower winners to the bronze medal match. In two classes with fewer than 8 entrants the 4 fastest qualifiers progressed directly to the two medal races.

== B 1-3 ==
=== Final Round ===
Gold

Rank	Athlete	Time	Notes
1st place, gold medalist(s)	Kieran Modra (AUS); Robert Crowe (AUS)	4:23.87	
2nd place, silver medalist(s)	Jan Mulder (NED); Pascal Schoots (NED)	OVL	

Bronze

Rank	Athlete	Time	Notes
3rd place, bronze medalist(s)	Ian Sharpe (GBR); Paul Hunter (GBR)	4:35.60	
4	Christian Venge (ESP); David Llaurado (ESP)	4:33.49	

== CP 3 ==
=== Final Round ===
Gold

Rank	Athlete	Time	Notes
1st place, gold medalist(s)	Darren Kenny (GBR)	3:46.26	WR
2nd place, silver medalist(s)	Javier Otxoa (ESP)	3:54.17	

Bronze

Rank	Athlete	Time	Notes
3rd place, bronze medalist(s)	Andrew Panazzolo (AUS)	3:58.87	
4	Maurice Eckhard (ESP)	4:07.41	

== CP 4 ==
=== Final Round ===
Gold

Rank	Athlete	Time	Notes
1st place, gold medalist(s)	Christopher Scott (AUS)	3:32.96	WR
2nd place, silver medalist(s)	Peter Homann (AUS)	3:41.44	

Bronze

Rank	Athlete	Time	Notes
3rd place, bronze medalist(s)	Jiri Bouska (CZE)	3:46.62	
4	Lubos Jirka (CZE)	3:52.22	

== LC 1 ==
=== Final Round ===
Gold

Rank	Athlete	Time	Notes
1st place, gold medalist(s)	Peter Brooks (AUS)	4:52.48	
2nd place, silver medalist(s)	Wolfgang Eibeck (AUT)	4:58.44	

Bronze

Rank	Athlete	Time	Notes
3rd place, bronze medalist(s)	Fabio Triboli (ITA)	5:03.43	
4	Ivan Renggli (SUI)	5:08.00	

== LC 2 ==
=== Final Round ===
Gold

Rank	Athlete	Time	Notes
1st place, gold medalist(s)	Roberto Alcaide (ESP)	4:58.59	
2nd place, silver medalist(s)	Jirí Ježek (CZE)	5:01.23	

Bronze

Rank	Athlete	Time	Notes
3rd place, bronze medalist(s)	Paul Martin (USA)		
4	Ron Williams (USA)	OVL	

== LC 3 ==
=== Final Round ===
Gold

Rank	Athlete	Time	Notes
1st place, gold medalist(s)	Laurent Thirionet (FRA)	4:02.81	PR
2nd place, silver medalist(s)	Tobias Graf (GER)	4:02.90	

Bronze

Rank	Athlete	Time	Notes
3rd place, bronze medalist(s)	Fabrizio Macchi (ITA)	4:07.43	
4	Antonio Garcia (ESP)	4:08.33	

== LC 4 ==
=== Final Round ===
Gold

Rank	Athlete	Time	Notes
1st place, gold medalist(s)	Michael Teuber (GER)		
2nd place, silver medalist(s)	Juanjo Mendez (ESP)	OVL	

Bronze

Rank	Athlete	Time	Notes
3rd place, bronze medalist(s)	Hans Peter Beier (GER)	4:32.09	
4	Wolfgang Dabernig (AUT)	OVL	
