= Cycling at the 2004 Summer Paralympics – Men's road race/time trial =

The Men's combined road race / time trial cycling events at the 2004 Summer Paralympics were held at Vouliagmeni between 24 & 27 September.

Each class cycled in a time trial and a road race, held on different days. Rankings were determined by adding the finishing positions in the two races, if this produced ties the aggregate times were used as tie-breakers.

== B 1-3 ==
Men's Road Race / Time Trial Tandem B1-3 at the XII Paralympic Games
- Paralympic Cycling
- Venue: Vouliagmeni
- Dates: 25–27 September 2004
- Competitors: 23 from 17 nations

Medalists
1st place, gold medalist(s)		Vasili Shaptsiaboi; Aliaksandr Danilik	Belarus
2nd place, silver medalist(s)		Christian Venge; David Llaurado	Spain
3rd place, bronze medalist(s)		Robert Crowe; Kieran Modra	Australia

The B1-3 event was won by Vasili Shaptsiaboi and his sighted pilot Aliaksandr Danilik, representing Belarus.

Road race 25 Sept. 2004, 10:00. Time trial 27 Sept. 2004, 14:05.

=== Final ranking ===
Rank	Athlete	Points	Notes
1st place, gold medalist(s)	Vasili Shaptsiaboi (BLR); Aliaksandr Danilik (BLR)	7	T:3:06:54
2nd place, silver medalist(s)	Christian Venge (ESP); David Llaurado (ESP)	7	T:3:05:51
3rd place, bronze medalist(s)	Robert Crowe (AUS); Kieran Modra (AUS)	9	
4	Miguel Angel Clemente (ESP); Ignacio Soler (ESP)	10	
5	Stephane Cote (CAN); Pierreolivier Boily (CAN)	13	T:3:07:27
6	Alexandre Bizet (FRA); Olivier Donval (FRA)	13	T:3:07:35
7	Jan Mulder (NED); Bart Boom (NED)	14	
8	Achim Moll (GER); Andre Kalfack (GER)	15	
9	Juan Suarez (ESP); Francisco Gonzalez (ESP)	16	
10	Jason Bryn (USA); Glenn Bunselmeyer (USA)	18	
11	Emanuele Bersini (ITA); Fabrizio Di Somma (ITA)	21	T:3:08:23
12	Robert Plotkowiak (POL); Krzysztof Kosikowski (POL)	21	T:3:09:12
13	Ian Sharpe (GBR); Paul Hunter (GBR)	24	
14	Raphael Ioset (SUI); Beat Howald (SUI)	27	
15	Lars Kristian Johnsen (NOR); Mattis Eriksen (NOR)	28	
16	Brian Cowie (CAN); Steve Rover (CAN)	33	
17	Tatsuyuki Oshiro (JPN); Hideki Tanzawa (JPN)	34	
18	Takuya Oki (JPN); Shigeo Yoshihara (JPN)	37	T:33:38
19	Mark Kehoe (IRL); Denis Toomey (IRL)	37	T:34:52
20	Matthew King (USA); Eric Degolier (USA)	38	
21	Symeon Triommatis (GRE); Christos Kalimeris (GRE)	41	
22	Anthony Biddle (AUS); Kial Stewart (AUS)	42	
	Vladislav Janovjak (SVK); Juraj Petrovic (SVK)		

== CP 3 ==
Men's Road Race / Time Trial CP Div 3 at the XII Paralympic Games
- Paralympic Cycling
- Venue: Vouliagmeni
- Dates: 24–27 September 2004
- Competitors: 9 from 8 nations

Medalists
1st place, gold medalist(s)		Javier Otxoa	Spain
2nd place, silver medalist(s)		Darren Kenny	Great Britain
3rd place, bronze medalist(s)		Rodrigo Lopez	Argentina

The CP3 event was won by Javier Otxoa, representing Spain.

Road race 24 Sept. 2004, 11:50. Time trial 27 Sept. 2004, 11:40.

=== Final ranking ===
Rank	Athlete	Points	Notes
1st place, gold medalist(s)	Javier Otxoa (ESP)	3	T:1:17:59
2nd place, silver medalist(s)	Darren Kenny (GBR)	3	T:1:18:04
3rd place, bronze medalist(s)	Rodrigo Lopez (ARG)	9	
4	Daniel Nicholson (USA)	11	T:1:19:54
5	Jean Quevillon (CAN)	11	T:1:20:10
6	Andrew Panazzolo (AUS)	11	T:1:20:18
7	Maurice Eckhard (ESP)	11	T:1:20:23
8	Jin Yong Sik (KOR)	12	
9	Augusto Pereira (POR)	18	

== CP 4 ==
Men's Road Race / Time Trial CP Div 4 at the XII Paralympic Games
- Paralympic Cycling
- Venue: Vouliagmeni
- Dates: 24–27 September 2004
- Competitors: 12 from 8 nations

Medalists
1st place, gold medalist(s)		Christopher Scott	Australia
2nd place, silver medalist(s)		Peter Homann	Australia
3rd place, bronze medalist(s)		Michel Alcaine	France

The CP4 event was won by Christopher Scott, representing Australia.

Road race 24 Sept. 2004, 11:50. Time trial 27 Sept. 2004, 11:50.

=== Final ranking ===
Rank	Athlete	Points	Notes
1st place, gold medalist(s)	Christopher Scott (AUS)	4	
2nd place, silver medalist(s)	Peter Homann (AUS)	5	
3rd place, bronze medalist(s)	Michel Alcaine (FRA)	7	T:1:48:25
4	Klaus Lungershausen (GER)	7	T:1:47:13
5	Jiri Bouska (CZE)	8	
6	Michael Kurz (AUT)	11	
7	Albert Michini (USA)	14	
8	Lubos Jirka (CZE)	17	
9	Janos Plekker (RSA)	19	T:1:52:47
10	Stephan Herholdt (RSA)	19	T:1:53:16
11	Petr Plihal (CZE)	21	
12	Kim Pan Kyu (KOR)	24	

== LC 1 ==
Men's Road Race / Time Trial LC1 at the XII Paralympic Games
- Paralympic Cycling
- Venue: Vouliagmeni
- Dates: 25–27 September 2004
- Competitors: 16 from 13 nations

Medalists
1st place, gold medalist(s)		Wolfgang Eibeck	Austria
2nd place, silver medalist(s)		Fabio Triboli	Italy
3rd place, bronze medalist(s)		Peter Brooks	Australia

The LC1 event was won by Wolfgang Eibeck, representing Austria.

Road race 25 Sept. 2004, 13:10. Time trial 27 Sept. 2004, 11:23.

=== Final ranking ===
Rank	Athlete	Points	Notes
1st place, gold medalist(s)	Wolfgang Eibeck (AUT)	2	
2nd place, silver medalist(s)	Fabio Triboli (ITA)	4	
3rd place, bronze medalist(s)	Peter Brooks (AUS)	7	
4	David Mercier (FRA)	11	
5	Gary Rosbotham-Williams (GBR)	15	T:2:39:05
6	Michael Lindgren (SWE)	15	T:2:39:17
7	Marc Breton (CAN)	15	T:2:42:40
8	Walter Marquardt (GER)	17	T:2:39:32
9	Guenter Brechtel (GER)	17	T:2:40:14
10	Pierangelo Vignati (ITA)	18	
11	Guenter Schambeck (GER)	19	
12	Roman Marcek (SVK)	22	
13	Akio Sakuma (JPN)	26	
14	Nezir Lupcevic (BIH)	30	
15	Loukas Anestis (GRE)	DNF	
16	Ivan Renggli (SUI)	DNF	

== LC 2 ==
Men's Road Race / Time Trial LC2 at the XII Paralympic Games
- Paralympic Cycling
- Venue: Vouliagmeni
- Dates: 25–27 September 2004
- Competitors: 14 from 11 nations

Medalists
1st place, gold medalist(s)		Jirí Ježek	Czech Republic
2nd place, silver medalist(s)		Roberto Alcaide	Spain
3rd place, bronze medalist(s)		Ron Williams	United States

The LC2 event was won by Jirí Ježek, representing Czech Republic.

Road race 25 Sept. 2004, 15:30. Time trial 27 Sept. 2004, 11:08.

=== Final ranking ===
Rank	Athlete	Points	Notes
1st place, gold medalist(s)	Jirí Ježek (CZE)	2	
2nd place, silver medalist(s)	Roberto Alcaide (ESP)	4	
3rd place, bronze medalist(s)	Ron Williams (USA)	7	
4	Eduard Novak (ROM)	9	
5	Patrick Ceria (FRA)	11	
6	Gotty Mueller (GER)	16	T:2:17:50
7	Morten Jahr (NOR)	16	T:2:19:59
8	Sebastien Serriere (FRA)	17	
9	Rivaldo Martins (BRA)	18	T:2:18:33
10	Amador Granado (ESP)	18	T:2:19:01
11	David Kuster (SLO)	21	
12	Paul Martin (USA)	22	
13	Alfred Kaiblinger (AUT)	22	
14	Panagiotis Paterakis (GRE)	27	

== LC 3 ==
Men's Road Race / Time Trial LC3 at the XII Paralympic Games
- Paralympic Cycling
- Venue: Vouliagmeni
- Dates: 25–27 September 2004
- Competitors: 14 from 13 nations

Medalists
1st place, gold medalist(s)		Antonio Garcia	Spain
2nd place, silver medalist(s)		Laurent Thirionet	France
3rd place, bronze medalist(s)		Paul Jesson	New Zealand

The LC3 event was won by Antonio Garcia, representing Spain.

Road race 25 Sept. 2004, 13:10. Time trial 27 Sept. 2004, 10:53.

=== Final ranking ===
Rank	Athlete	Points	Notes
1st place, gold medalist(s)	Antonio Garcia (ESP)	4	
2nd place, silver medalist(s)	Laurent Thirionet (FRA)	5	
3rd place, bronze medalist(s)	Paul Jesson (NZL)	8	
4	Andreas Gemassmer (ITA)	9	
5	Victor Marquez (VEN)	12	
6	Michal Stark (CZE)	13	
7	Tobias Graf (GER)	14	
8	Fabrizio Macchi (ITA)	15	
9	Robinson Martinez (COL)	17	T:2:02:58
10	Beat Schwarzenbach (SUI)	17	T:2:07:19
11	Bradley Cobb (USA)	20	
12	Daniel Coulthrust (BAR)	24	
13	Mahmood Meili (IRI)	26	
14	Qaher Hazrat (AFG)	26	

== LC 4 ==
Men's Road Race / Time Trial LC4 at the XII Paralympic Games
- Paralympic Cycling
- Venue: Vouliagmeni
- Dates: 25–27 September 2004
- Competitors: 7 from 5 nations

Medalists
1st place, gold medalist(s)		Michael Teuber	Germany
2nd place, silver medalist(s)		Wolfgang Dabernig	Austria
3rd place, bronze medalist(s)		Erich Winkler	Germany

The LC4 event was won by Michael Teuber, representing Germany.

Road race 25 Sept. 2004, 15:30. Time trial 27 Sept. 2004, 10:45.

=== Final ranking ===
Rank	Athlete	Points	Notes
1st place, gold medalist(s)	Michael Teuber (GER)	3	
2nd place, silver medalist(s)	Wolfgang Dabernig (AUT)	6	
3rd place, bronze medalist(s)	Erich Winkler (GER)	7	
4	Juanjo Mendez (ESP)	8	T:1:31:25
5	Greg Ball (AUS)	8	T:1:36:32
6	Hans Peter Beier (GER)	11	
7	Bruce Penner (CAN)	13	
