= Cycling at the 2008 Summer Paralympics – Men's 1 km time trial (LC 3–4) =

Men's 1 km time trial (LC 3-4) at the XIII Paralympic Games
- Venue: Laoshan Velodrome
- Dates: 7 September
- Competitors: 20 from 12 nations
- Winning time: 1:14.936

Medalists
1st place, gold medalist(s)		Simon Richardson	Great Britain
2nd place, silver medalist(s)		Maskai Fujita	Japan
3rd place, bronze medalist(s)		Greg Ball	Australia

The Men's 1 km time trial (LC 3-4) at the 2008 Summer Paralympics took place on 7 September at the Laoshan Velodrome.

The world records for both LC3 and LC4 categories were broken during the event. Simon Richardson (Great Britain) set a new record of 1:14.936 for the LC3 class and Greg Ball (USA) set a new record of 1:21.157 for the LC4 class. This was the first gold medal for Great Britain at the 2008 Summer Paralympics.

PR = Paralympic Record WR = World Record

== Results ==
Rank	Name	Class	Time	Factor (%)	Final Time with % factor
	Simon Richardson (GBR)	LC3	1:14.936 WR	100.000	1:14.936
	Maskai Fujita (JPN)	LC3	1:17.314	100.000	1:17.314
	Greg Ball (AUS)	LC4	1:21.157 WR	95.718	1:17.681
4	Paolo Vigano (ITA)	LC4	1:21.172	95.718	1:17.696
5	Tobias Graf (GER)	LC3	1:18.515	100.000	1:18.515
6	Zhang Lu (CHN)	LC3	1:18.603	100.000	1:18.603
7	Michael Teuber (GER)	LC4	1:22.473	95.718	1:18.941
8	Laurent Thirionet (FRA)	LC3	1:20.561	100.000	1:20.561
9	Michael Milton (AUS)	LC3	1:21.578	100.000	1:21.578
10	Antonio Garcia (ESP)	LC3	1:21.954	100.000	1:21.954
11	Stéphane Bahier (FRA)	LC3	1:22.526	100.000	1:22.526
12	Erich Winkle (GER)	LC4	1:26.757	95.718	1:23.042
13	Pierre Seka (GER)	LC4	1:27.161	95.718	1:23.428
14	Alexander Hohlrieder (AUT)	LC4	1:27.690	95.718	1:23.935
15	Juan Jose Mendez (ESP)	LC4	1:28.392	95.718	1:24.607
16	Victor Garrido (VEN)	LC3	1:27.054	100.000	1:27.054
17	Wolfgang Dabernig (AUT)	LC4	1:31.787	95.718	1:27.856
18	Erich Stauffer (AUT)	LC3	1:27.934	100.000	1:27.934
19	Flaviano Carvalho (BRA)	LC3	1:28.973	100.000	1:28.973
20	Anthony Zahn (USA)	LC4	1:33.275	95.718	1:29.280
