= Cycling at the 2008 Summer Paralympics – Men's individual pursuit (LC 4) =

Men's Individual Pursuit LC4 at the XIII Paralympic Games
- Paralympic Cycling (track)
- Venue: Laoshan Velodrome
- Dates: 9 September 2008
- Competitors: 8 from 5 nations

Medalists
1st place, gold medalist(s)		Paolo Vigano	Italy
2nd place, silver medalist(s)		Michael Teuber	Germany
3rd place, bronze medalist(s)		Juan Jose Mendez	Spain

The Men's individual pursuit LC4 track cycling event at the 2008 Summer Paralympics was competed on 9 September. It was won by Paolo Vigano, representing Italy.

== Qualifying ==
Qualified for gold medal race
Qualified for bronze medal race

9 Sept. 2008, 10:15

Rank	Athlete	Time	Notes
1	Paolo Vigano (ITA)	3:59.74	WR
2	Michael Teuber (GER)	4:05.93	
3	Juan Jose Mendez (ESP)	4:16.69	
4	Erich Winkler (GER)	4:17.74	
5	Pierre Senska (GER)	4:25.25	
6	Anthony Zahn (USA)	4:27.05	
7	Wolfgang Dabernig (AUT)	4:40.61	
	Alexander Hohlrieder (AUT)	DNS	

== Final round ==
9 Sept. 2008, 16:35

Gold

Rank	Athlete	Time	Notes
1st place, gold medalist(s)	Paolo Vigano (ITA)	4:02.78	
2nd place, silver medalist(s)	Michael Teuber (GER)	4:10.11	

Bronze

Rank	Athlete	Time	Notes
3rd place, bronze medalist(s)	Juan Jose Mendez (ESP)	4:14.98	
4	Erich Winkler (GER)	4:21.55	
