= Cycling at the 2012 Summer Paralympics – Men's road time trial C1 =

Cycling, Men's road time trial C1 at the XIV Paralympic Games
- Venue: Brands Hatch
- Dates: September 5, 2012
- Competitors: 9 from 7 nations

Medalists
1st place, gold medalist(s)		Michael Teuber	Germany
2nd place, silver medalist(s)		Mark Colbourne	Great Britain
3rd place, bronze medalist(s)		Li Zhang Yu	China

The Men's time trial C1 road cycling event at the 2012 Summer Paralympics took place on September 5 at Brands Hatch. Nine riders from seven different nations competed. The race distance was 16 km.

== Results ==
Rank	Name	Country	Time
1st place, gold medalist(s)	Michael Teuber	Germany	25:16.43
2nd place, silver medalist(s)	Mark Colbourne	Great Britain	25:29.37
3rd place, bronze medalist(s)	Li Zhang Yu	China	26:23.11
4	Erich Winkler	Germany	26:38.87
5	Juan Jose Mendez	Spain	26:40.96
6	Rodrigo Fernando Lopez	Argentina	27:42.75
7	Brayden McDougall	Canada	28:17.49
8	Anthony Zahn	United States	29:18.28
9	Jaye Milley	Canada	29:25.57
