= 2007 Volta a Lleida =

Race details
- Dates: June 4–9
- Stages: 6
- Distance: 668.1 km (415.1 mi)
- Winning time: 16h 09' 15"

Results
	Winner	Francis De Greef (BEL)	(Davitamon–WFL)
	Second	Klaas Sys (BEL)	(Davitamon–WFL)
	Third	Alessandro Bisolti (ITA)	(Palazzago–Sacla)
	Points	Klaas Vantornout (BEL)	(Fidea)
	Mountains	Stefano Pirazzi (ITA)	(Palazzago–Sacla)
	Sprints	Daniel Domínguez (ESP)	(Ávila Rojas)
	Team	(Italy) Palazzago–Sacla	

The 2007 Volta a Lleida (55th edition) road cycling race took place from June 4 to June 9, 2007, in Lleida, Catalonia, Spain. Francis De Greef took overall victory, becoming second rider of Belgium to win general classification.

== Stages ==
=== Stage 1 – June 4, 2007: Lleida > Alcarràs, 120.4 km ===
Stage 1 Results

	Cyclist	Team	Time
1	Kevin Pauwels (BEL)	Fidea	2h 40' 35"
2	Antonio Miguel (ESP)	Massi	s.t.
3	Rafael Valls (ESP)	Valencian Community	s.t.
4	Jorge Martín (ARG)	Diputación de León	s.t.
5	Jempy Drucker (LUX)	Fidea	s.t.

General Classification after Stage 1

	Cyclist	Team	Time
1	Kevin Pauwels (BEL)	Fidea	2h 40' 35"
2	Antonio Miguel (ESP)	Massi	s.t.
3	Rafael Valls (ESP)	Valencian Community	s.t.
4	Jorge Martín (ARG)	Diputación de León	s.t.
5	Jempy Drucker (LUX)	Fidea	s.t.

=== Stage 2 – June 5, 2007: Alcarràs > Tremp, 114.3 km ===
Stage 2 Results

	Cyclist	Team	Time
1	Sven Vandousselare (BEL)	Davitamon–WFL	2h 38' 40"
2	Jorge Martín (ARG)	Diputación de León	s.t.
3	Jempy Drucker (LUX)	Fidea	s.t.
4	Klaas Vantornout (BEL)	Fidea	s.t.
5	Kevin Pauwels (BEL)	Fidea	s.t.

General Classification after Stage 2

	Cyclist	Team	Time
1	Jorge Martín (ARG)	Diputación de León	5h 19' 15"
2	Kevin Pauwels (BEL)	Fidea	s.t.
3	Jempy Drucker (LUX)	Fidea	s.t.
4	Antonio Miguel (ESP)	Massi	s.t.
5	Rafael Valls (ESP)	Valencian Community	s.t.

=== Stage 3 – June 6, 2007: Tremp > La Seu d'Urgell, 85.4 km ===
Stage 3 Results

	Cyclist	Team	Time
1	Francis De Greef (BEL)	Davitamon–WFL	2h 10' 24"
2	Luis Mate (ESP)	Andalucía–CajaSur	s.t.
3	Josep Llesuy (ESP)	Ditec–Costa Daurada	s.t.
4	Alessandro Bisolti (ITA)	Palazzago–Sacla	s.t.
5	Josué Gutiérrez (ESP)	UC Fuenlabrada	s.t.

General Classification after Stage 3

	Cyclist	Team	Time
1	Antonio Miguel (ESP)	Massi	7h 29' 39"
2	Kevin Pauwels (BEL)	Fidea	s.t.
3	Jorge Martín (ARG)	Diputación de León	s.t.
4	Francis De Greef (BEL)	Davitamon–WFL	s.t.
5	Rafael Valls (ESP)	Valencian Community	s.t.

=== Stage 4 – June 7, 2007: La Seu d'Urgell > Vielha, 127.3 km ===
Stage 4 Results

	Cyclist	Team	Time
1	Stefano Pirazzi (ITA)	Palazzago–Sacla	3h 33' 53"
2	Klaas Vantornout (BEL)	Fidea	s.t.
3	Zdeněk Štybar (CZE)	Fidea	+ 7"
4	Petr Dlask (CZE)	Fidea	s.t.
5	Josep Llesuy (ESP)	Ditec–Costa Daurada	s.t.

General Classification after Stage 4

	Cyclist	Team	Time
1	Stefano Usai (ITA)	Palazzago–Sacla	11h 03' 39"
2	Francis De Greef (BEL)	Davitamon–WFL	s.t.
3	Alessandro Bisolti (ITA)	Palazzago–Sacla	s.t.
4	Josep Llesuy (ESP)	Ditec–Costa Daurada	s.t.
5	Klaas Sys (BEL)	Davitamon–WFL	s.t.

=== Stage 5 – June 8, 2007: Vielha > Les, 20.0km (TTT) ===
Stage 5 Results

	Cyclist	Team	Time
1	Michel Vanderaerden (BEL)	Davitamon–WFL	19' 21"
2	Francis De Greef (BEL)	Davitamon–WFL	s.t.
3	Klaas Sys (BEL)	Davitamon–WFL	s.t.
4	Sven Vandousselare (BEL)	Davitamon–WFL	s.t.
5	Ingmar de Poortere (BEL)	Davitamon–WFL	s.t.

General Classification after Stage 5

	Cyclist	Team	Time
1	Francis De Greef (BEL)	Davitamon–WFL	11h 23' 00"
2	Klaas Sys (BEL)	Davitamon–WFL	s.t.
3	Stefano Usai (ITA)	Palazzago–Sacla	+ 54"
4	Alessandro Bisolti (ITA)	Palazzago–Sacla	s.t.
5	Antonio García (ESP)	UP Valencia-Bancaja	+ 1' 24"

=== Stage 5 (second area) – June 8, 2007: Les > El Pont de Suert, 60.0 km ===
Stage 5 (second area) Results

	Cyclist	Team	Time
1	Stefano Pirazzi (ITA)	Palazzago–Sacla	1h 26' 59"
2	Zdeněk Štybar (CZE)	Fidea	+ 37"
3	Kevin Pauwels (BEL)	Fidea	s.t.
4	Luis Mate (ESP)	Andalucía–CajaSur	s.t.
5	Klaas Vantornout (BEL)	Fidea	s.t.

General Classification after Stage 5 (second area)

	Cyclist	Team	Time
1	Francis De Greef (BEL)	Davitamon–WFL	12h 50' 36"
2	Klaas Sys (BEL)	Davitamon–WFL	s.t.
3	Stefano Usai (ITA)	Palazzago–Sacla	+ 54"
4	Alessandro Bisolti (ITA)	Palazzago–Sacla	s.t.
5	Antonio García (ESP)	UP Valencia-Bancaja	+ 1' 24"

=== Stage 6 – June 9, 2007: El Pont de Suert > Lleida, 140.7 km ===
Stage 6 Results

	Cyclist	Team	Time
1	Stanislav Volkov (RUS)	Lokomotiv	3h 18' 33"
2	Alessandro Bisolti (ITA)	Palazzago–Sacla	s.t.
3	Klaas Vantornout (BEL)	Fidea	+ 6"
4	Egor Lutskovic (RUS)	Russia	s.t.
5	Rafael Valls (ESP)	Valencian Community	s.t.

General Classification after Stage 6

	Cyclist	Team	Time
1	Francis De Greef (BEL)	Davitamon–WFL	16h 09' 15"
2	Klaas Sys (BEL)	Davitamon–WFL	s.t.
3	Alessandro Bisolti (ITA)	Palazzago–Sacla	+ 48"
4	Stefano Usai (ITA)	Palazzago–Sacla	+ 54"
5	Antonio García (ESP)	UP Valencia-Bancaja	+ 1' 24"
