= 2008 Volta a Lleida =

Race details
- Dates: June 2–June 7
- Stages: 6
- Distance: 680.0 km (422.5 mi)
- Winning time: 17h 41' 30"

Results
	Winner	Lars Boom (NED)	(Rabobank)
	Second	Carlos Ibáñez (COL)	(Diputación de León)
	Third	Wout Poels (NED)	(P3 Transfer-Batavus)
	Points	Sergi Escobar (ESP)	(Azpiru-Ugarte)
	Mountains	Stefano Pirazzi (ITA)	(Palazzago-Grigolin)
	Sprints	Zdeněk Štybar (CZE)	(Fidea)
	Team	(Netherlands) Rabobank	

The 2008 Volta a Lleida (56th edition) road cycling race took place from June 2 to June 7, 2008 in Lleida, Catalonia, Spain. Lars Boom took the overall victory, becoming the second rider from the Netherlands to win the general classification.

== Stages ==
=== Stage 1 - June 2, 2008: Lleida > Alcarràs, 116.4 km ===
Stage 1 Results

	Cyclist	Team	Time
1	Bart Wellens (BEL)	Fidea	2h 39' 02"
2	Sven Vandousselare (BEL)	Silence–Lotto	s.t.
3	Vladimir Tuychiev (UZB)	Palazzago-Grigolin	s.t.
4	Federico Pagani (ARG)	Diputación de León	s.t.
5	Tejay van Garderen (USA)	Rabobank	+ 4"

General Classification after Stage 1

	Cyclist	Team	Time
1	Bart Wellens (BEL)	Fidea	2h 39' 02"
2	Sven Vandousselare (BEL)	Silence–Lotto	s.t.
3	Vladimir Tuychiev (UZB)	Palazzago-Grigolin	s.t.
4	Federico Pagani (ARG)	Diputación de León	s.t.
5	Tejay van Garderen (USA)	Rabobank	+ 4"

=== Stage 2 - June 3, 2008: Alcarràs > Tremp, 114.3 km ===
Stage 2 Results

	Cyclist	Team	Time
1	Kevin Pauwels (BEL)	Fidea	2h 31' 49"
2	Alexei Markov (RUS)	Katysuha	s.t.
3	Antonio Miguel (ESP)	Camp de Tarragona	s.t.
4	Ger Soepenberg (NED)	P3 Transfer-Batavus	s.t.
5	Sergi Escobar (ESP)	Azpiru-Ugarte	s.t.

General Classification after Stage 2

	Cyclist	Team	Time
1	Bart Wellens (BEL)	Fidea	5h 10' 51"
2	Sven Vandousselare (BEL)	Silence–Lotto	s.t.
3	Vladimir Tuychiev (UZB)	Palazzago-Grigolin	s.t.
4	Federico Pagani (ARG)	Diputación de León	s.t.
5	Tejay van Garderen (USA)	Rabobank	+ 4"

=== Stage 3 - June 4, 2008: Tremp > La Seu d'Urgell, 125.1 km ===
Stage 3 Results

	Cyclist	Team	Time
1	Marcel Beima (NED)	Rabobank	3h 04' 30"
2	Antonio García (ESP)	UP Valencia-Bancaja	s.t.
3	Antonio Miguel (ESP)	Camp de Tarragona	+ 24"
4	Vladimir Shchekuncy (RUS)	Lokomotiv	s.t.
5	Alexei Markov (RUS)	Katysuha	s.t.

General Classification after Stage 3

	Cyclist	Team	Time
1	Marcel Beima (NED)	Rabobank	8h 15' 34"
2	Antonio García (ESP)	UP Valencia-Bancaja	s.t.
3	Bart Wellens (BEL)	Fidea	+ 18"
4	Sven Vandousselare (BEL)	Silence–Lotto	s.t.
5	Vladimir Tuychiev (UZB)	Palazzago-Grigolin	s.t.

=== Stage 4 - June 5, 2008: La Seu d'Urgell > Les, 147.3 km ===
Stage 4 Results

	Cyclist	Team	Time
1	Sergi Escobar (ESP)	Azpiru-Ugarte	4h 03' 52"
2	Carlos Ibáñez (COL)	Diputación de León	s.t.
3	Lars Boom (NED)	Rabobank	+ 1' 16"
4	Wout Poels (NED)	P3 Transfer-Batavus	+ 1' 17"
5	Roman Klimov (RUS)	Katyusha	s.t.

General Classification after Stage 4

	Cyclist	Team	Time
1	Sergi Escobar (ESP)	Azpiru-Ugarte	12h 19' 50"
2	Carlos Ibáñez (COL)	Diputación de León	s.t.
3	Antonio García (ESP)	UP Valencia-Bancaja	+ 53"
4	Alessandro Bisolti (ITA)	Palazzago-Grigolin	+ 1' 17"
5	Álvaro García (ESP)	UP Valencia-Bancaja	s.t.

=== Stage 5 - June 6, 2008: Les > Vielha, 20.0km (TTT) ===
Stage 5 Results

	Cyclist	Team	Time
1	Tejay van Garderen (USA)	Rabobank	27' 00"
2	Lars Boom (NED)	Rabobank	s.t.
3	Joeri Adams (BEL)	Rabobank	s.t.
4	Marcel Beima (NED)	Rabobank	s.t.
5	Cristiano Colombo (ITA)	Palazzago-Grigolin	+ 57"

General Classification after Stage 5

	Cyclist	Team	Time
1	Carlos Ibáñez (COL)	Diputación de Léon	12h 48' 23"
2	Lars Boom (NED)	Rabobank	+ 11"
3	Alessandro Bisolti (ITA)	Palazzago-Grigolin	+ 41"
4	Artur Tarasau (BLR)	Palazzago-Grigolin	s.t.
5	Alexander Rybakov (RUS)	Lokomotiv	+ 1' 12"

=== Stage 5 (second area) - June 6, 2008: Les > El Pont de Suert, 60.0 km ===
Stage 5 (second area) Results

	Cyclist	Team	Time
1	Lars Boom (NED)	Rabobank	1h 21' 39"
2	Sergi Escobar (ESP)	Azpiru-Ugarte	s.t.
3	Wout Poels (NED)	P3 Transfer-Batavus	s.t.
4	Dmitry Kosyakov (RUS)	Katyusha	+ 1' 02"
5	Roman Klimov (RUS)	Katyusha	s.t.

General Classification after Stage 5 (second area)

	Cyclist	Team	Time
1	Lars Boom (NED)	Rabobank	14h 10' 13"
2	Carlos Ibáñez (COL)	Diputación de León	+ 51"
3	Wout Poels (NED)	P3 Transfer-Batavus	+ 1' 11"
4	Sergi Escobar (ESP)	Azpiru-Ugarte	+ 1' 16"
5	Alessandro Bisolti (ITA)	Palazzago-Grigolin	+ 1' 32"

=== Stage 6 - June 7, 2008: El Pont de Suert > Lleida, 140.7 km ===
Stage 6 Results

	Cyclist	Team	Time
1	Federico Pagani (ARG)	Diputación de León	3h 30' 42"
2	Josef Boxmeer (NED)	Diputación de León	+ 9"
3	Tejay van Garderen (USA)	Rabobank	s.t.
4	Antonio Miguel (ESP)	Camp de Tarragona	+ 35"
5	Javier Alonso (ESP)	Diputación de León	s.t.

General Classification after Stage 6

	Cyclist	Team	Time
1	Lars Boom (NED)	Rabobank	17h 41' 30"
2	Carlos Ibáñez (COL)	Diputación de León	+ 51"
3	Wout Poels (NED)	P3 Transfer-Batavus	+ 1' 11"
4	Sergi Escobar (ESP)	Azpiru-Ugarte	+ 1' 16"
5	Alessandro Bisolti (ITA)	Palazzago-Grigolin	+ 1' 32"

== Teams and cyclists ==
The following teams were named to the 2008 Volta a Catalunya:

Belgium

- Silence–Lotto (DAV)
- Fidea (FID)

Italy

- Palazzago-Grigolin (PAL)

Netherlands

- P3 Transfer-Batavus (BAT)
- Rabobank (RAB)

Russia

- Lokomotiv (LOK)
- Katyusha (KAT)

Spain

- Ilerda Habitatges (ALC)
- Azpiru-Ugarte (AZP)
- UP Valencia-Bancaja (BAN)
- Cafemax Contentpolis (CAF)
- Diputación de León (DIP)
- Paint-Car-Massi (MAS)
- Seguros Bilbao (SEG)
- Camp de Tarragona (TAR)
