= Cycling at the 2004 Summer Paralympics – Men's individual pursuit (B1–3) =

Men's Individual Pursuit Tandem B1-3 at the XII Paralympic Games
- Paralympic Cycling (track)
- Venue: Olympic Velodrome
- Dates: 18–19 September 2004
- Competitors: 19 from 14 nations

Medalists
1st place, gold medalist(s)		Kieran Modra; Robert Crowe	Australia
2nd place, silver medalist(s)		Jan Mulder; Pascal Schoots	Netherlands
3rd place, bronze medalist(s)		Ian Sharpe; Paul Hunter	Great Britain

The Men's individual pursuit tandem B1-3 track cycling event at the 2004 Summer Paralympics was competed on 18 & 19 September. It was won by Kieran Modra and his sighted pilot Robert Crowe, representing Australia.

== Qualifying ==
18 Sept. 2004, 14:00

Qualified for next round

Rank	Athlete	Time	Notes
1	Kieran Modra (AUS); Robert Crowe (AUS)	4:21.45	WR
2	Jan Mulder (NED); Pascal Schoots (NED)	4:32.05	
3	Ian Sharpe (GBR); Paul Hunter (GBR)	4:33.68	
4	Christian Venge (ESP); David Llaurado (ESP)	4:33.73	
5	Ignacio Soler (ESP); Miguel Angel Clemente (ESP)	4:36.38	
6	Stephane Cote (CAN); Pierreolivier Boily (CAN)	4:38.04	
7	Francisco Gonzalez (ESP); Juan Suarez (ESP)	4:38.95	
8	Murray Solem (CAN); Brian Cowie (CAN)	4:39.35	
9	Mattis Eriksen (NOR); Terje Tho (NOR)	4:39.76	
10	Aliaksandr Danilik (BLR); Vasili Shaptsiaboi (BLR)	4:43.25	
11	Emanuele Bersini (ITA); Fabrizio Di Somma (ITA)	4:43.45	
12	Raphael Ioset (SUI); Beat Howald (SUI)	4:46.13	
13	Alexandre Bizet (FRA); Olivier Donval (FRA)	4:49.42	
14	Jason Bryn (USA); Glenn Bunselmeyer (USA)	4:50.30	
15	Hideki Tanzawa (JPN); Tatsuyuki Oshiro (JPN)	4:57.42	
16	Shigeo Yoshihara (JPN); Takuya Oki (JPN)	5:06.20	
17	Mark Kehoe (IRL); Ian Mahon (IRL)	5:15.37	
18	Christos Kalimeris (GRE); Symeon Triommatis (GRE)	5:29.86	
	Matthew King (USA); Eric Degolier (USA)	DNS	

== 1st round ==
19 Sept. 2004, 10:15

Qualified for gold final
Qualified for bronze final

Heat 1

Rank	Athlete	Time	Notes
1	Christian Venge (ESP); David Llaurado (ESP)	4:32.96	
2	Ignacio Soler (ESP); Miguel Angel Clemente (ESP)	4:37.32	

Heat 2

Rank	Athlete	Time	Notes
1	Ian Sharpe (GBR); Paul Hunter (GBR)	4:29.35	
2	Stephane Cote (CAN); Pierreolivier Boily (CAN)	OVL	

Heat 3

Rank	Athlete	Time	Notes
1	Jan Mulder (NED); Pascal Schoots (NED)	4:27.98	
2	Francisco Gonzalez (ESP); Juan Suarez (ESP)	OVL	

Heat 4

Rank	Athlete	Time	Notes
1	Kieran Modra (AUS); Robert Crowe (AUS)	4:26.92	
2	Murray Solem (CAN); Brian Cowie (CAN)	OVL	

== Final round ==
19 Sept. 2004, 12:00

Gold

Rank	Athlete	Time	Notes
1st place, gold medalist(s)	Kieran Modra (AUS); Robert Crowe (AUS)	4:23.87	
2nd place, silver medalist(s)	Jan Mulder (NED); Pascal Schoots (NED)	OVL	

Bronze

Rank	Athlete	Time	Notes
3rd place, bronze medalist(s)	Ian Sharpe (GBR); Paul Hunter (GBR)	4:35.60	
4	Christian Venge (ESP); David Llaurado (ESP)	4:33.49	
