= Cycling at the 2004 Summer Paralympics – Men's individual pursuit (LC 3) =

Men's Individual Pursuit LC3 at the XII Paralympic Games
- Paralympic Cycling (track)
- Venue: Olympic Velodrome
- Dates: 18–19 September 2004
- Competitors: 10 from 9 nations

Medalists
1st place, gold medalist(s)		Laurent Thirionet	France
2nd place, silver medalist(s)		Tobias Graf	Germany
3rd place, bronze medalist(s)		Fabrizio Macchi	Italy

The Men's individual pursuit LC3 track cycling event at the 2004 Summer Paralympics was competed from 18 to 19 September. It was won by Laurent Thirionet, representing France.

== Qualifying ==
Qualified for next round

18 Sept. 2004, 10:30

Rank	Athlete	Time	Notes
1	Antonio Garcia (ESP)	4:09.74	PR
2	Tobias Graf (GER)	4:09.91	
3	Fabrizio Macchi (ITA)	4:10.41	
4	Laurent Thirionet (FRA)	4:12.87	
5	Andreas Gemassmer (ITA)	4:14.61	
6	Paul Jesson (NZL)	4:16.26	
7	Michal Stark (CZE)	4:16.27	
8	Victor Marquez (VEN)	4:16.41	
9	Beat Schwarzenbach (SUI)	4:19.66	
10	Bradley Cobb (USA)	4:21.28	

== 1st round ==
Qualified for gold final
Qualified for bronze final

Heat 1

19 Sept. 2004, 12:35

Rank	Athlete	Time	Notes
1	Laurent Thirionet (FRA)	4:02.96	PR
2	Andreas Gemassmer (ITA)	OVL	

Heat 2

Rank	Athlete	Time	Notes
1	Fabrizio Macchi (ITA)	4:11.63	
2	Paul Jesson (NZL)	4:12.89	

Heat 3

Rank	Athlete	Time	Notes
1	Tobias Graf (GER)	4:07.04	
2	Michal Stark (CZE)	4:13.99	

Heat 4

Rank	Athlete	Time	Notes
1	Antonio Garcia (ESP)	4:08.61	
2	Victor Marquez (VEN)	4:19.17	

== Final round ==
19 Sept. 2004, 15:30

Gold

Rank	Athlete	Time	Notes
1st place, gold medalist(s)	Laurent Thirionet (FRA)	4:02.81	PR
2nd place, silver medalist(s)	Tobias Graf (GER)	4:02.90	

Bronze

Rank	Athlete	Time	Notes
3rd place, bronze medalist(s)	Fabrizio Macchi (ITA)	4:07.43	
4	Antonio Garcia (ESP)	4:08.33	
