= Cycling at the 2004 Summer Paralympics – Men's individual pursuit (LC 4) =

Men's Individual Pursuit LC4 at the XII Paralympic Games
- Paralympic Cycling (track)
- Venue: Olympic Velodrome
- Dates: 18–19 September 2004
- Competitors: 6 from 4 nations

Medalists
1st place, gold medalist(s)		Michael Teuber	Germany
2nd place, silver medalist(s)		Juan José Méndez Fernández	Spain
3rd place, bronze medalist(s)		Hans Peter Beier	Germany

The Men's individual pursuit LC4 track cycling event at the 2004 Summer Paralympics was competed from 18 to 19 September. It was won by Michael Teuber, representing Germany.

== Qualifying ==
Qualified for gold final
Qualified for bronze final

18 Sept. 2004, 10:00

Rank	Athlete	Time	Notes
1	Michael Teuber (GER)	4:17.91	PR
2	Juan José Méndez Fernández (ESP)	4:31.28	
3	Wolfgang Dabernig (AUT)	4:45.16	
4	Hans Peter Beier (GER)	4:46.37	
5	Erich Winkler (GER)	4:49.86	
6	Bruce Penner (CAN)	4:50.01	

== Final round ==
19 Sept. 2004, 15:10

Gold

Rank	Athlete	Time	Notes
1st place, gold medalist(s)	Michael Teuber (GER)		
2nd place, silver medalist(s)	Juan José Méndez Fernández (ESP)	OVL	

Bronze

Rank	Athlete	Time	Notes
3rd place, bronze medalist(s)	Hans Peter Beier (GER)	4:32.09	
4	Wolfgang Dabernig (AUT)	OVL	
