= Alexander Rybakov (cyclist) =

Russian cyclist

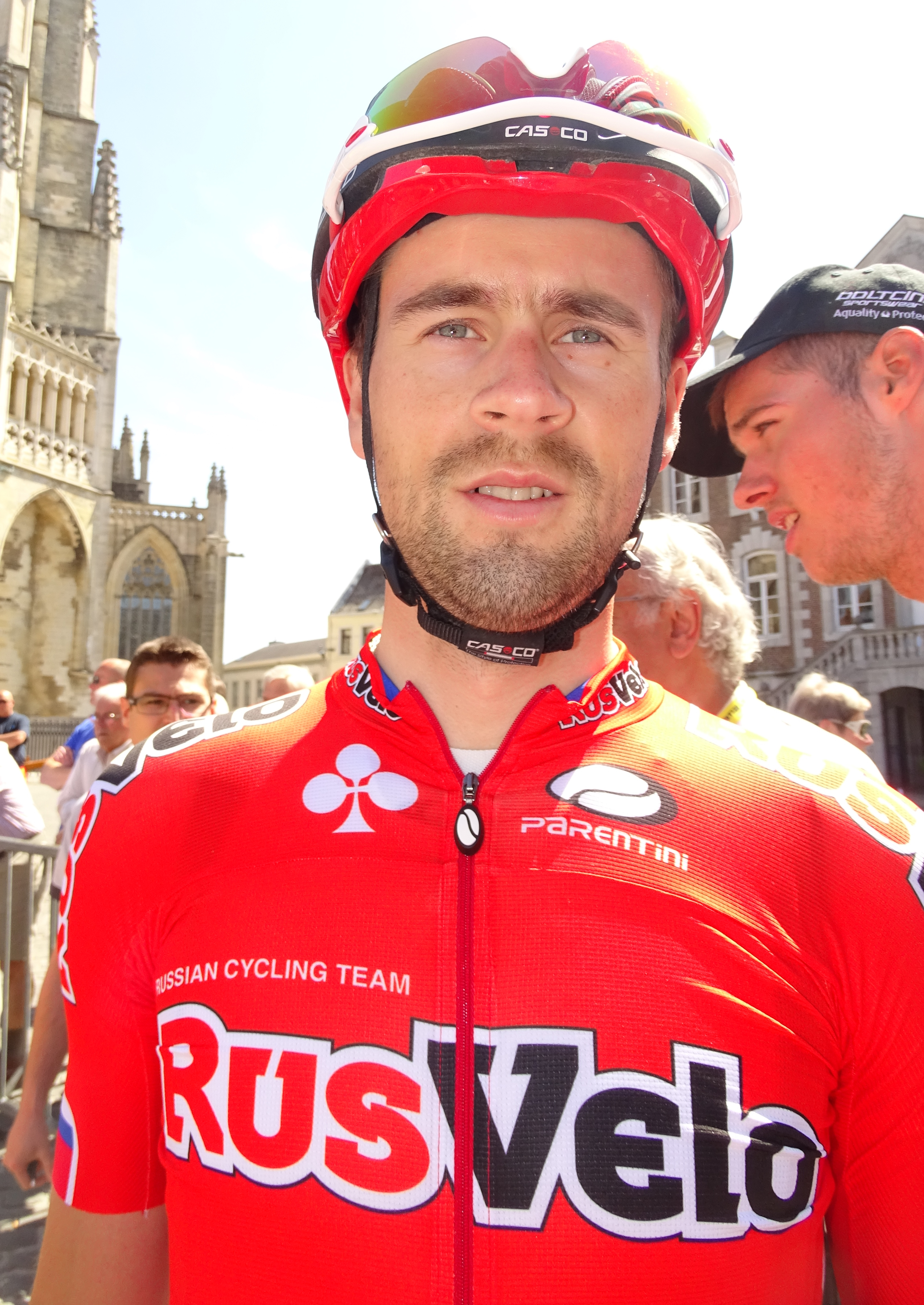
- Rybakov in 2015

Personal information
- Full name: Aleksandr Vladimirovich Rybakov
- Born: 17 May 1988 (age 38) Russia
- Height: 1.81 m (5 ft 11 in)
- Weight: 65 kg (143 lb)

Cycling career
- Sport: Cycling
- Disciplines: Road; Track
- Role: Rider
- Rider type: Rouleur

Professional teams
- 2009: Lokomotiv
- 2012: Itera–Katusha
- 2013: RusVelo
- 2014: Team Katusha
- 2015: RusVelo

Alexander Vladimirovich Rybakov (Russian: Александр Владимирович Рыбаков; born 17 May 1988) is a Russian former cyclist. He rode for UCI WorldTeam Team Katusha in 2014.

== Major results ==
2006
3rd Team pursuit, UEC European Junior Track Championships
2007
10th Overall Volta a Lleida
2008
7th Overall Volta a Lleida
2011
2nd Team pursuit, National Track Championships
2012
1st Memorial Oleg Dyachenko
5th Overall Grand Prix of Adygeya
5th Overall Grand Prix of Sochi
8th Gran Premio Città di Camaiore
8th Duo Normand (with Ilnur Zakarin)
2013
1st Memorial Oleg Dyachenko
10th Overall Tour of Slovenia
2015
8th Memorial Oleg Dyachenko
