= Simon Richardson (Welsh cyclist) =

Welsh racing cyclist

Simon Richardson MBE
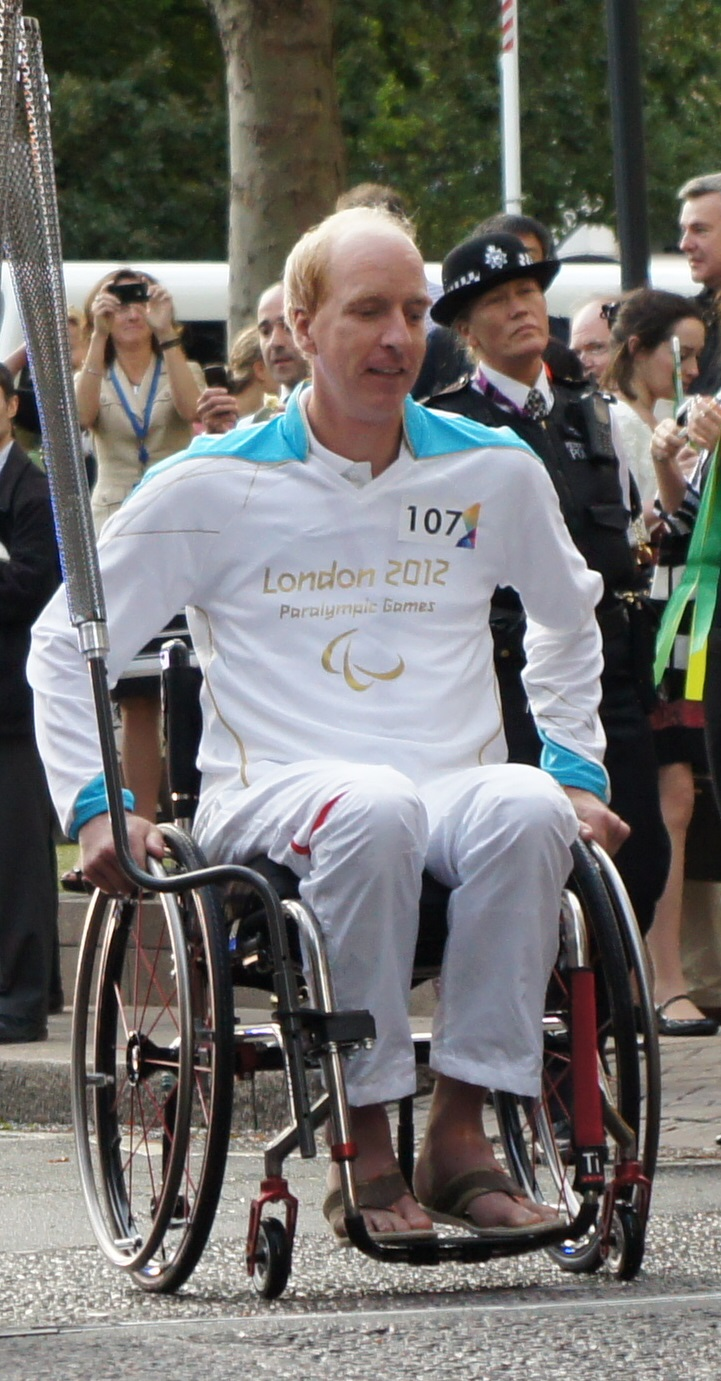
- Richardson carrying the Paralympic flame in 2012

Personal information
- Born: 10 November 1966 (age 59) Porthcawl, Wales

Cycling career
- Sport: Cycling
- Current team: Big Maggys
- Disciplines: Track & Road
- Role: Rider
Medal record
Representing Great Britain
Men's track cycling
Paralympic Games
Gold medal – first place	2008 Beijing	Kilo (LC 3–4)
Gold medal – first place	2008 Beijing	Individual pursuit (LC3)

Simon Richardson MBE (born 10 November 1966) is a Welsh paralympic racing cyclist.

== Biography ==
Richardson was born in 1966 in Porthcawl, Wales, and is the son of John and Diana Richardson. He is married to Amanda and has two sons Ashley and Benjamin. In 2001 he was involved in a car accident which left him with serious leg and back injuries and no feeling down his left hand side. Prior to his accident Richardson was a keen cyclist, but he stopped cycling until 2005 when his doctors advised him to start training again to help his rehabilitation. Richardson cycled powered only by his right leg, riding an adapted bike. He made his debut in the Welsh national team in 2006, competing at the Welsh Grand Prix and entered the road race and time trial, finishing seventh and fifth respectively. He later competed at the Para-Cycling Europa Cup held in 2007 which was held in Germany where he placed seventh. Richardson is coached by Courtney Rowe and trains at the Wales National Velodrome, which is situated in the Newport International Sports Village. His development is organised through the Disability Sport Wales Performance Programme.

It was announced on 31 December 2008 that Richardson was to be appointed a Member of the Order of the British Empire (MBE) in the 2009 New Year Honours "[f]or services to Disabled Sport".

In August 2011, Richardson was injured when struck by a hit and run driver, whilst he was cycling on the A48 between Cowbridge and Bridgend, South Wales. He was described as being in "critical condition", with "fractures to the spine, a broken pelvis, a broken breast bone, cuts to his legs, and a "detached" lung". The injuries meant that he was unable to compete at the 2012 Summer Paralympics in London, despite having been "a very top contender to be considered" for the Games.

The motorist who hit Richardson was subsequently convicted of dangerous driving and jailed for 18 months at Cardiff Crown Court.

== 2008 Beijing Paralympic Games ==
Richardson competed at the 2008 Summer Paralympics held in Beijing, China, initially in the LC 3–4 class kilo, finishing in a world record time of 1 minute 14.936 seconds. This time secured the gold medal and was his first win in a major event. Richardson later competed in the LC3–4 3 km individual pursuit, finishing in 3 minutes 49.214 seconds which secured his second gold medal of the games. The LC3–4 class is for athletes with lower limb disabilities, which may affect one or both of the lower limbs. Richardson went on to take the Silver medal in the LC3 class road time trial in a time of 38 minutes 23.73 seconds, 23.42 seconds behind gold medallist Laurent Thirionet. He also competed in the men's individual road race on 13 September 2008, finishing in tenth place.

== See also ==
- Cycling at the 2008 Summer Paralympics
- Great Britain at the 2008 Summer Paralympics
- Sport in Wales
