= Roman Klimov =

Russian cyclist (born 1985)

Personal information
- Full name: Roman Guennadievitch Klimov
- Born: 19 January 1985 (age 41)

Cycling career
- Sport: Cycling
- Current team: Retired
- Discipline: Road
- Role: Rider

Professional teams
- 2006–2007: Premier
- 2008–2009: Katyusha

Roman Guennadievitch Klimov (born 19 January 1985) is a Russian former professional road cyclist.

== Major results ==
2007
1st Grand Prix of Moscow
2nd Overall Grand Prix of Sochi

1st Stages 3 & 4 (ITT)

2nd Overall Tour of Hainan

1st Stage 6

2008
2nd Overall Grand Prix of Sochi

1st Stage 4

3rd Overall Circuito Montañés

1st Stage 4

8th Overall Volta a Lleida
2010
10th Mayor Cup
