= Joan Calucho =

Spanish cyclist (born 1925)

Personal information
- Full name: Joan Calucho Mestres
- Born: 25 June 1925 Lleida, Catalonia, Spain

Cycling career
- Sport: Cycling
- Discipline: Road
- Role: Rider

Professional teams
- 1945: AC Montjuïc
- 1946: CC Lleida
- 1947: AC Montjuïc
- 1948: CC Lleida
- 1950: UC Lleida
- 1952: CC Barcelona
- 1953-1954: UC Terrassa
- 1955: Mobylette
- 1958-1959: Sicoris

Joan Calucho Mestres (born 25 June 1925) is a Spanish former cyclist, who was a professional between 1945 and 1959. In 1945, Joan Calucho turned professional with the AC Montjuïc team. His first victory was at the Volta a Lleida that season, which he won again three years later.

== Biography ==
Joan Calucho was born in Lleida on 25 June 1925. His brother Jaume Calucho Mestres was also a professional cyclist. In 1955, Calucho competed in the Vuelta a España. After UC Terrassa announced 1954 would be its final season in professional cycling, he moved to Mobylette for the 1955 season. Calucho retired in 1959.

== Major results ==
1945
1st Volta a Lleida
1948
1st Volta a Lleida
1950
1st Circuit Ribera del Jalón

=== Vuelta a España results ===
- 1955
