= César Neira Pérez =

Spanish cyclist

César Neira
Personal information
- Full name: César Neira Pérez
- Nationality: Spanish
- Born: 15 December 1979 (age 46) Cadalso de los Vidrios, Madrid, Spain

Sport
- Country: Spain
- Sport: Cycling
- Disability: Cerebral palsy
- Disability class: C4
Medal record
Men's cycling
Representing Spain
Paralympic Games
Gold medal – first place	2008 Beijing	Road individual time trial CP4
Bronze medal – third place	2008 Beijing	Track individual pursuit CP4

César Neira Pérez (born 15 December 1979) is a cyclist from Spain.

== Personal ==
Neira was born on 15 December 1979 in Cadalso de los Vidrios, Madrid. He has cerebral palsy.

== Cycling ==
Neira is a C4 classified cyclist. He started as a road cyclist. He competed at the 2008 Summer Paralympics in cycling. He was the number one cyclists to finish in the Road Trial race. He won a bronze in the Individual Pursuit track race. He also competed in cycling at the 2012 Summer Paralympics and 2016 Summer Paralympics.
