= Cycling at the 2008 Summer Paralympics – Men's individual pursuit (CP 4) =

Men's individual pursuit (CP 4) at the XIII Paralympic Games
- Venue: Laoshan Velodrome
- Dates: 7 September
- Competitors: 9 from 8 nations
- Winning time: 3:40.144

Medalists
| 1st place, gold medalist(s) | | Christopher Scott | Australia |
| 2nd place, silver medalist(s) | | Masashi Ishi | Japan |
| 3rd place, bronze medalist(s) | | Cesar Neira | Spain |

The Men's individual pursuit (CP 4) at the 2008 Summer Paralympics took place on 7 August at the Laoshan Velodrome.

== Records ==
Records prior to the event
| PR | 3:32.958 | Christopher Scott (AUS) | Athens (Greece) | 20 September 2004 |
| WR | 3:32.958 | Christopher Scott (AUS) | Athens (Greece) | 19 September 2004 |

== Preliminaries ==
Masashi Ishi (Japan) rode the quickest time in the preliminary round, beating Christopher Scott (Australia) by just 0.643 seconds. They went head to head in the final for gold and silver whilst Cesar Neira (Spain) was third, just 0.047 seconds quicker than fourth placed Jiri Bouska (Czech Republic).

Q = Qualifier PR = Paralympic Record WR = World Record

| Rank | Name | Time |
|---|---|---|
| 1 | Masashi Ishi (JPN) | 3:37.848 Q |
| 2 | Christopher Scott (AUS) | 3:38.205 Q |
| 3 | Jiri Bouska (CZE) | 3:45.269 Q |
| 4 | Cesar Neira (ESP) | 3:45.322 Q |
| 5 | Klaus Lungershausen (GER) | 3:52.561 |
| 6 | Lubos Jirka (CZE) | 3:53.566 |
| 7 | Enda Smyth (IRL) | 3:55.919 |
| 8 | Janos Plekker (RSA) | 3:55.933 |
| 9 | Michael Farrell (USA) | 4:04.606 |

== Finals ==
The final rounds saw equally close margins, but this time the placing were reversed with Scott taking gold from Ishi with a margin of just 0.013 seconds, and Neira taking the bronze.

Gold medal match

| Name | Time | Rank |
|---|---|---|
| Christopher Scott (AUS) | 3:40.144 | 1 |
| Masashi Ishi (JPN) | 3:40.157 | 1 |

Bronze medal match

| Name | Time | Rank |
|---|---|---|
| Cesar Neira (ESP) | 3:45.753 | 1 |
| Jiri Bouska (CZE) | 3:48.912 | 4 |
