= Klaas Sys =

Belgian cyclist

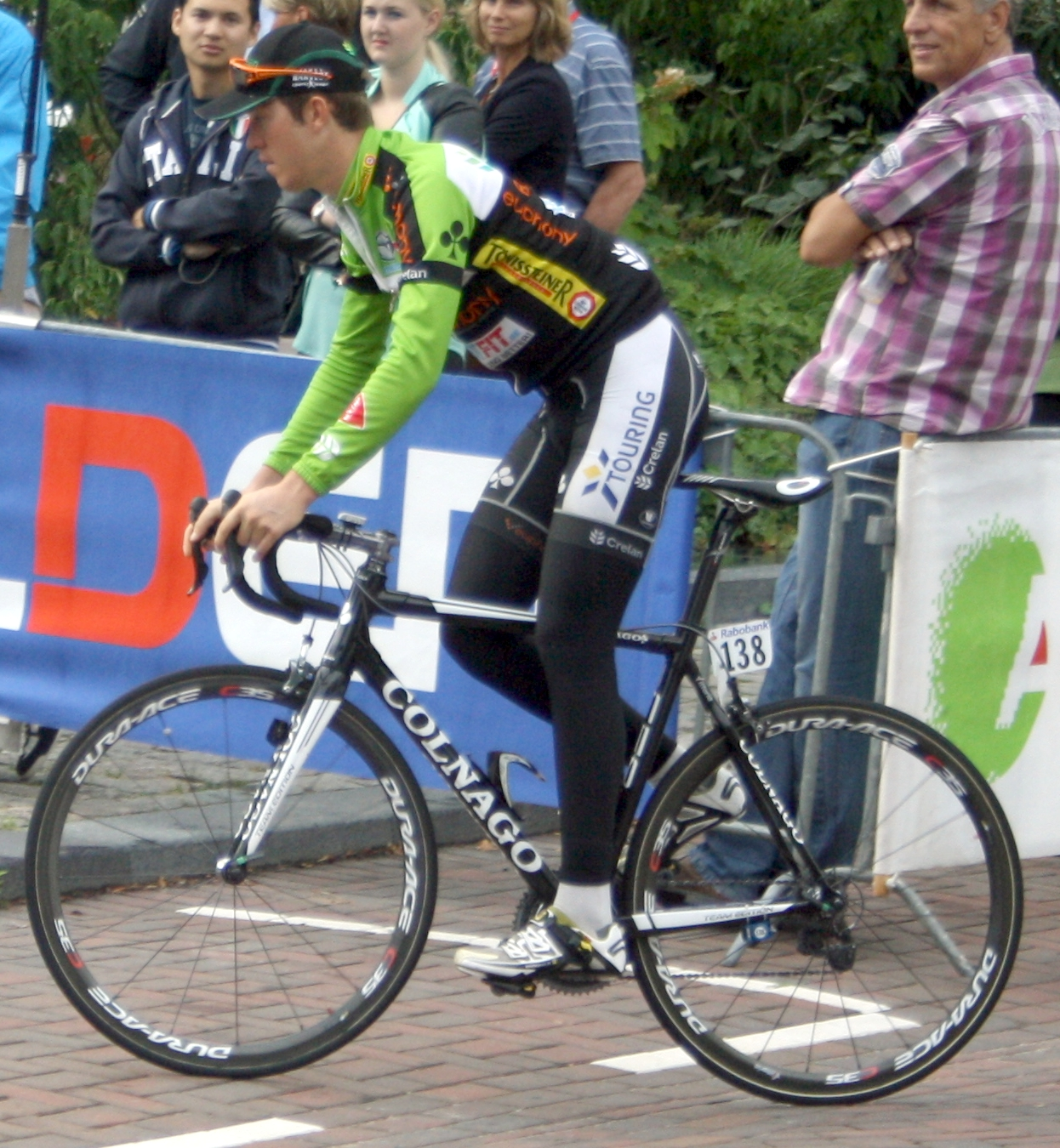
- Sys at the 2013 World Ports Classic

Personal information
- Full name: Klaas Sys
- Born: 30 November 1986 (age 39) Belgium

Cycling career
- Sport: Cycling
- Current team: Retired
- Discipline: Road
- Role: Rider

Professional teams
- 2007–2008: Davitamon–Win for Life–Jong Vlaanderen
- 2012: Bridgestone–Anchor
- 2013: Crelan–Euphony
- 2014: Josan–To Win

Klaas Sys (born 30 November 1986) is a Belgian former professional cyclist.

== Major results ==
2007
2nd Overall Volta a Lleida

1st Stage 5a (TTT)

2009
1st Stage 3 Circuit des Ardennes
3rd Romsée–Stavelot–Romsée
2010
2nd Memorial Gilbert Letêcheur
3rd Omloop Het Nieuwsblad Beloften
2011
1st Tour Nivernais Morvan
2nd Overall Tour de Guadeloupe

1st Stages 1 & 4

2nd Romsée–Stavelot–Romsée
2nd Tour du Pays du Roumois
