= Francis De Greef =

Belgian road bicycle racer

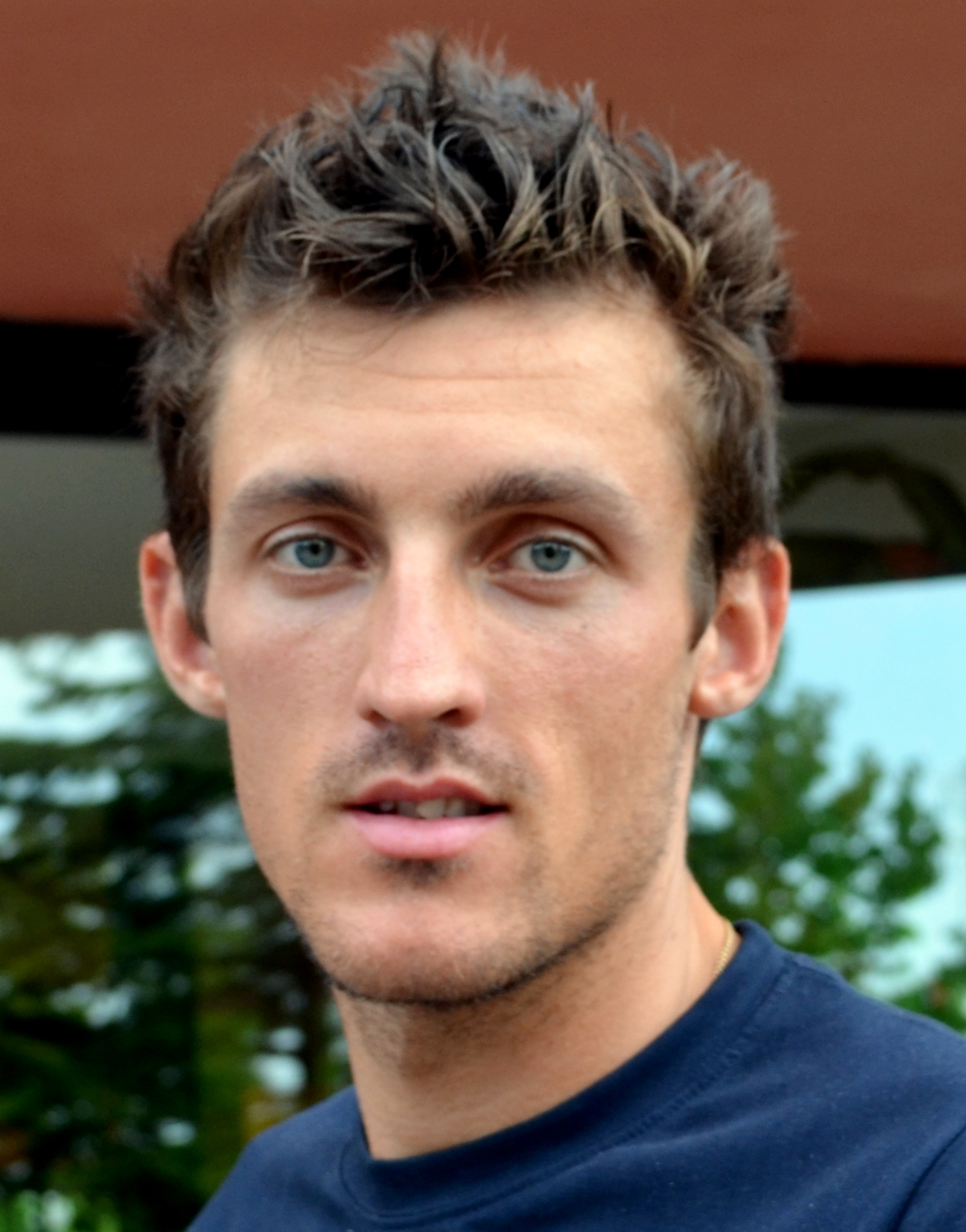
- De Greef at the 2014 Tour de l'Ain.

Personal information
- Full name: Francis De Greef
- Born: 2 February 1985 (age 41) Rumst, Belgium
- Height: 1.93 m (6 ft 4 in)
- Weight: 78 kg (172 lb)

Cycling career
- Sport: Cycling
- Current team: Retired
- Discipline: Road
- Role: Rider

Amateur team
- 2005–2007: Bodysol–Win for Life–Jong Vlaanderen

Professional teams
- 2008–2013: Silence–Lotto
- 2014–2015: Wanty–Groupe Gobert

Francis De Greef (born 2 February 1985 in Rumst) is a retired Belgian road bicycle racer, who rode professionally between 2008 and 2015 for the Lotto–Belisol and Wanty–Groupe Gobert teams.

== Major results ==
2005
1st Flèche Ardennaise
3rd Time trial, National Under-23 Road Championships
6th Overall Volta a Lleida
2006
5th Overall Giro della Valle d'Aosta
5th Flèche Ardennaise
2007
1st Time trial, National Under-23 Road Championships
1st Overall Volta a Lleida

1st Stages 3 & 5a (TTT)

1st Circuit du Hainaut
2nd Overall Ronde de l'Isard
3rd Overall Triptyque des Barrages
4th Overall Le Triptyque des Monts et Châteaux
6th Overall Giro delle Regioni
9th Overall Giro della Valle d'Aosta
10th Time trial, UCI Under-23 Road World Championships
2009
8th Overall Driedaagse van West-Vlaanderen
2014
1st Combination classification Tour du Limousin
