= Cadalso de los Vidrios =

- Municipality
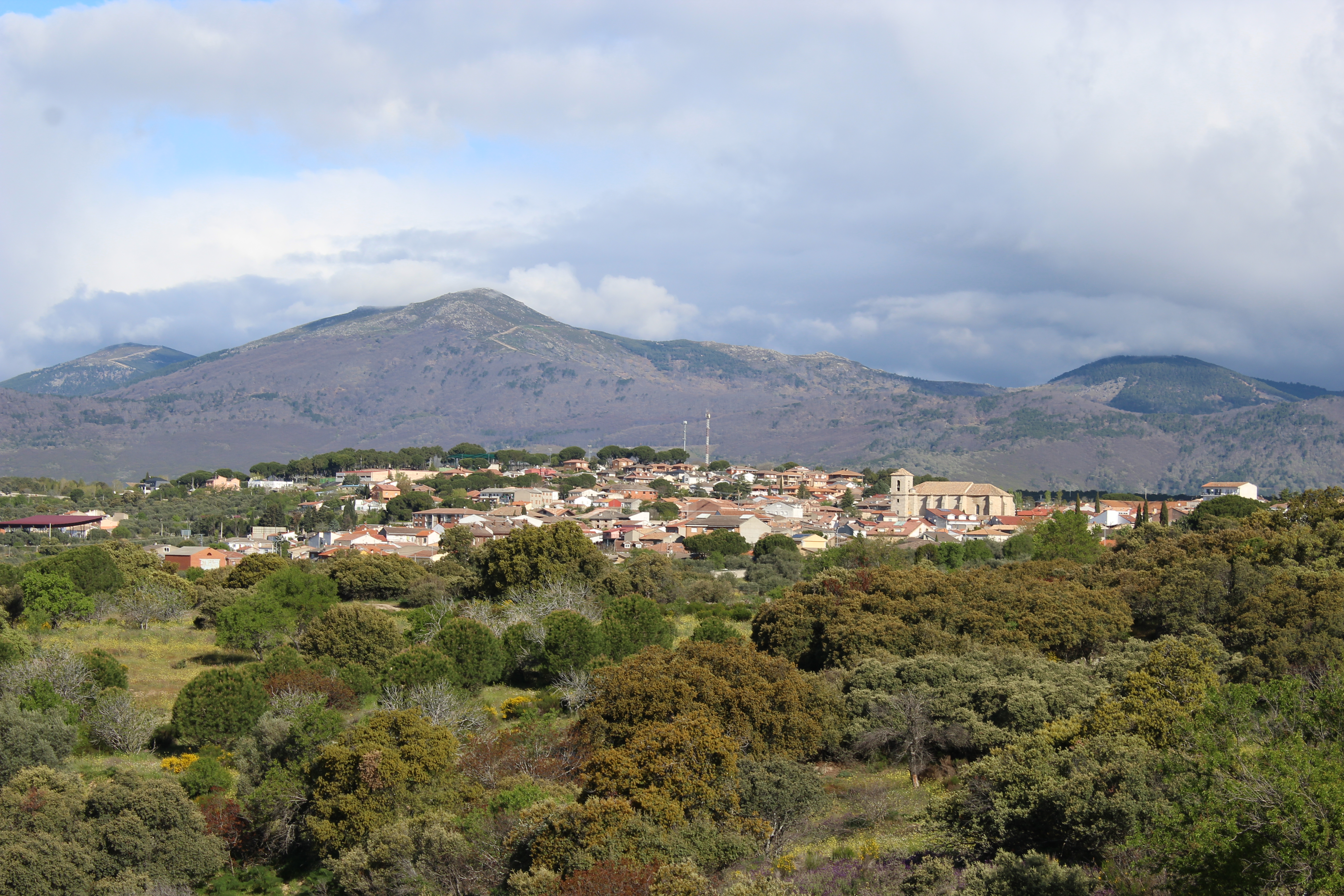

- Flag Coat of arms

- Location of Cadalso de los Vidrios in Madrid

- Location in Spain Cadalso de los Vidrios (Community of Madrid)
- Coordinates: 40°18′05″N 4°26′30″W
- Country: Spain
- Region: Community of Madrid

Government
  - Mayor: Verónica Muñoz Villalva

Area
  - Total: 47.64 km^{2} (18.39 sq mi)
- Elevation: 804 m (2,638 ft)

Population (2025-01-01)
  - Total: 3,372
  - Density: 70.78/km^{2} (183.3/sq mi)
- Time zone: UTC+1 (CET)
  - Summer (DST): UTC+2 (CEST)
- Postal code: 28640

Cadalso de los Vidrios (Spanish pronunciation: [kaˈðalso ðe los ˈβi.ðɾjos]) is a municipality the Community of Madrid, Spain. Located in the southwest of the region, it lies on the spurs of the Sistema Central. It is noted by its granite quarries. The municipality covers an area of 47.64 km^{2}. As of 2018, it has a population of 3,049.
