= Volta a Lleida =

Race details
- Date: Early June
- Region: Lleida, Spain
- English name: Tour of Lleida
- Local name(s): Volta a Lleida (in Catalan)
- Discipline: Road
- Competition: UCI Europe Tour (2005–2008)
- Type: Stage race
- Organiser: Penya Cliclista Colomina

History
- First edition: 1942
- Editions: 56
- Final edition: 2008
- First winner: Baltasar Tarrós (ESP)
- Most wins: 2 wins: Baltasar Tarrós (ESP); Joan Calucho (ESP)
- Final winner: Lars Boom (NED)

The Volta a Lleida was a road cycling stage race held in the Lleida region of Spain. It was a 2.2 category race on the UCI Europe Tour between 2005 and 2008.

== List of overall winners ==
Volta a Lleida winners
Volta	Year	Nat	Winner	Nat	Second	Nat	Third
61	2018	(Spain)	Txomin Juaristi	(Netherlands)	Reinier Honig	(Spain)	Eusebio Pascual
60	2017	(Brazil)	Nícolas Sessler	(Spain)	Iván Martínez	(Spain)	Iñaki Gozálbez
59	2016	(Spain)	Óscar Linares	(Chile)	Elías Tello	(Spain)	Jorge Bueno
58	2015	(Russia)	Artem Samolenkov	(Russia)	Dmitry Strakhov	(Spain)	Jorge Arcas
57	2014	(Spain)	Adrià Moreno	(Spain)	Juan de Dios González	(Spain)	José Guillén
2009 to 2012: suspended
56	2008	(Netherlands)	Lars Boom	(Colombia)	Carlos Andrés Ibáñez	(Netherlands)	Wout Poels
55	2007	(Belgium)	Francis De Greef	(Belgium)	Klaas Sys	(Italy)	Alessandro Bisolti
54	2006	(Russia)	Mikhail Ignatiev	(Spain)	Manuel Jiménez	(Russia)	Pavel Brutt
53	2005	(Belarus)	Branislau Samoilau	(Russia)	Pavel Brutt	(Spain)	Vicente Peiró
52	2004	(Spain)	Antonio Arenas	(Belarus)	Siutsou Kanstanstin	(Spain)	Fernando Serrano
51	2003	(Spain)	Xavier Reyes	(Finland)	Jukka Vastaranta	(Spain)	Iban Latasa
50	2002	(Spain)	Jesús Ramírez	(Spain)	Santiago Segú	(Spain)	Tomás Lloret
49	2001	(Ukraine)	Alexander Rotar	(Spain)	Héctor Toledo	(Ukraine)	Volodymyr Savchenko
48	2000	(Spain)	Miquel Alandete	(Spain)	Roger Lucía	(Russia)	Vladimir Karpets
47	1999	(Netherlands)	Thorwald Veneberg	(Spain)	Frederic Ivars	(Spain)	Ricardo Ochoa
46	1998	(Spain)	José Urea	(Spain)	Frederic Ivars	(Belgium)	Manu L'Hoir
45	1997	(Russia)	Denis Menchov	(Spain)	Marc Prat	(Belgium)	Stive Vermaut
44	1996	(France)	Thierry Elissalde	(Russia)	Sergei Gritchenko	(Venezuela)	Manuel Guevara
43	1995	(Spain)	Eligio Requejo	(Spain)	Jacob Viladoms	(Spain)	Javier Otxoa
42	1994	(Spain)	Manuel Beltrán	(Spain)	Blas Giner León	(Estonia)	Raido Kodanipork
41	1993	(Russia)	Sergey Suleimanov	(Spain)	Antonio Civantos	(Spain)	Luis Pérez Rodríguez
40	1992	(Ukraine)	Sergey Savinotchkin			(Spain)	Francisco Cerezo
39	1991	(Spain)	Alberto Ortiga				
38	1990	(Germany)	Fedor Gelin	(Soviet Union)	Oleg Kozlitine		
37	1989	(Spain)	Vicente Aparicio	(Spain)	Félix García Casas		
36	1988	(Soviet Union)	Dimitri Zhdanov	(Soviet Union)	Evgueni Berzin	(Spain)	Juan Francisco Guillén
35	1987	(Spain)	José Pedrero	(Belgium)	Marc Brock	(Spain)	Francisco López
34	1986	(Spain)	Javier Ruiz	(Spain)	Joaquim Llach	(Spain)	José López
33	1985	(Spain)	Emili García	(Spain)	Javier Ruiz	(Spain)	Martí Urpina
32	1984	(Spain)	Jesús Alonso	(Spain)	Joaquim Llach	(Belgium)	Alex Debremaeker
31	1983	(Spain)	José Luis Navarro	(Spain)	Juan Alberto Reig	(Spain)	Antonio Llopis
30	1982	(Spain)	Miguel Ángel Iglesias			(Spain)	José Luis Navarro
29	1981	(Belgium)	Alex Debremaeker				
28	1980	(Spain)	Jaume Vilamajó				
27	1979	(Spain)	Antoni Coll				
26	1978	(Spain)	Francesc Sala	(Spain)	Pedro Delgado	(Spain)	José Recio
25	1977	(Spain)	Pedro Larrinaga				
24	1976	(Spain)	José Luis Mayoz				
23	1975	(Spain)	Fernando Cabrero				
22	1974	(Spain)	Jesús Líndez	(Spain)	José Nazabal	(Spain)	Jesús López Carril
21	1973	(Spain)	Ramón Medina				
20	1972	(Spain)	Joan Pujol				
19	1971	(Spain)	Javier Mínguez				
18	1970	(Spain)	Josep Pesarrodona				
17	1969	(Spain)	Antonio Martos	(Spain)	Manuel Blanco	(Spain)	Andrés Oliva
16	1968	(Spain)	R. Iglesias				
15	1967	(Spain)	Joaquín Pérez	(Spain)	José Angueira	(Spain)	Fermín Andrés
14	1966	(Spain)	Eugenio Lisarde				
13	1965	(Spain)	Lluís Mayoral				
12	1964	(Spain)	Sebastià Segú				
1960 to 1963: suspended
11	1959	(Spain)	Angelino Soler				
10	1958	(Spain)	Domingo Ferrer				
9	1957	(Spain)	Andreu Carulla				
8	1956	(Spain)	Lluís Gras				
7	1955	(Spain)	J. Casals				
1949 to 1954: suspended
6	1948	(Spain)	Joan Calucho (2)				
1947: suspended
5	1946	(Spain)	Emilio Mediano				
4	1945	(Spain)	Joan Calucho				
3	1944	(Spain)	Ramon Massana				
2	1943	(Spain)	Baltasar Tarrós (2)				
1	1942	(Spain)	Baltasar Tarrós				
