= Alessandro Bisolti =

Italian cyclist

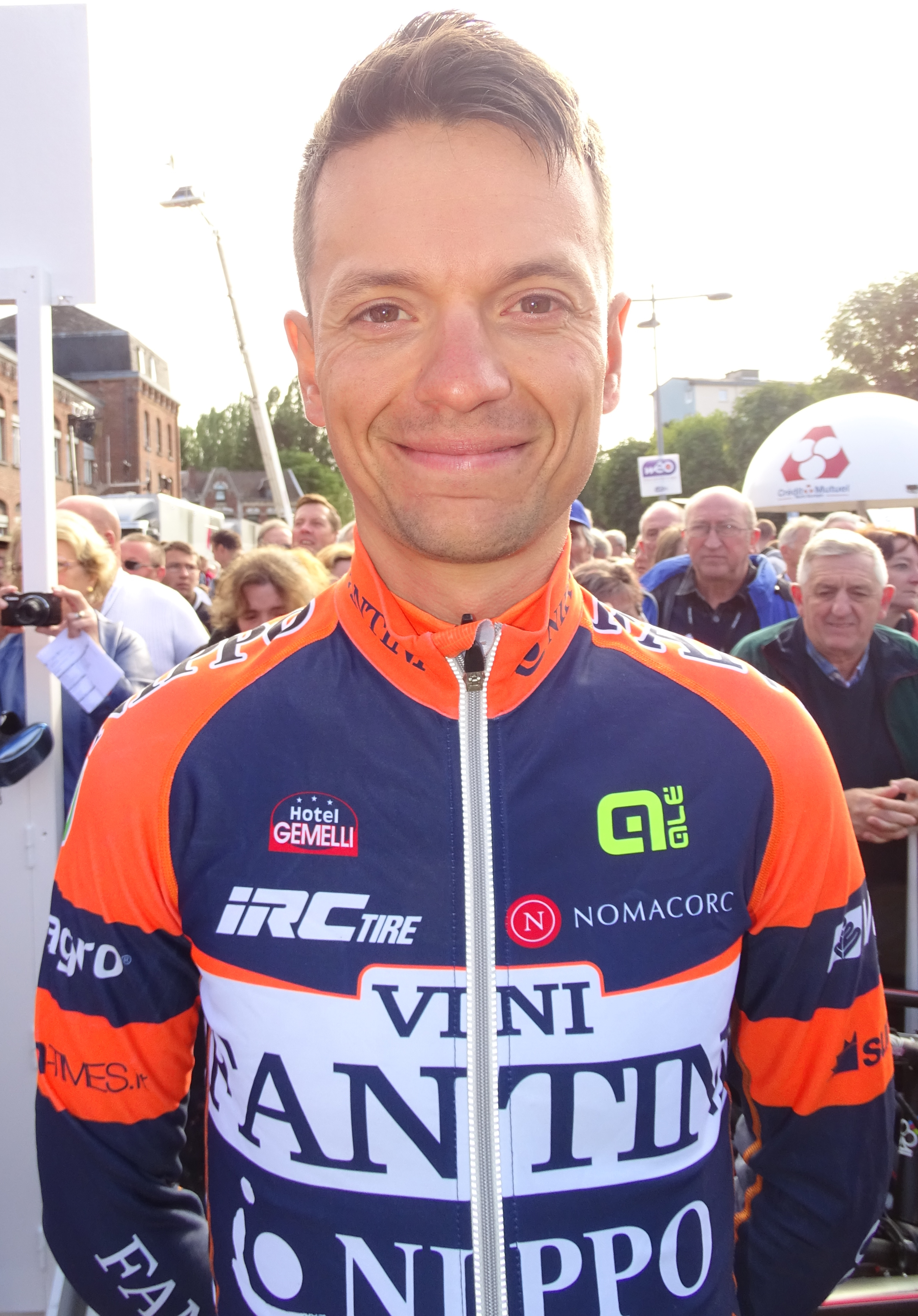
- Bisolti at the 2015 Grand Prix de Fourmies.

Personal information
- Full name: Alessandro Bisolti
- Born: 7 March 1985 (age 41) Gavardo, Italy
- Height: 1.75 m (5 ft 9 in)
- Weight: 58 kg (128 lb)

Cycling career
- Sport: Cycling
- Current team: Retired
- Discipline: Road
- Role: Rider

Amateur teams
- 2004: L'Edile–Rosa Carni–Gaverina
- 2005–2008: Palazzago

Professional teams
- 2007: Tinkoff Credit Systems (stagiaire)
- 2009–2010: CSF Group–Navigare
- 2011: Farnese Vini–Neri Sottoli
- 2012: Team Idea
- 2014–2017: Vini Fantini–Nippo
- 2018–2023: Androni Giocattoli–Sidermec

Alessandro Bisolti (born 7 March 1985) is an Italian former professional racing cyclist, who competed as a professional from 2009 to 2023. He was named in the start list for the 2016 Giro d'Italia.

== Major results ==
2006
1st Overall Giro della Valle d'Aosta

1st Points classification

6th Overall Giro ciclistico della provincia di Cosenza
6th GP Capodarco
7th Overall Giro Ciclistico d'Italia
7th Cronoscalata Gardone V.T. - Prati di Caregno
8th Gara Milionaria - Tr. Marini Silvano Cappelli Sp.
10th Trofeo Internazionale Bastianelli
2007
3rd Overall Volta a Lleida
3rd Trofeo Gianfranco Bianchin
5th Gran Premio Palio del Recioto
6th Piccolo Giro di Lombardia
8th Trofeo Franco Balestra
2008
5th Overall Volta a Lleida
7th Overall Giro della Valle d'Aosta
2010
8th Gran Premio Industria e Commercio di Prato
8th Giro di Toscana
2012
5th GP Industria & Artigianato di Larciano
6th Gran Premio Nobili Rubinetterie
10th Grand Prix Südkärnten
2014
10th Overall Istrian Spring Trophy
2017
9th Gran Premio di Lugano
2018
3rd Overall Tour of Bihor
9th Overall Sibiu Cycling Tour
2019
7th Overall La Tropicale Amissa Bongo
8th Overall Tour de Langkawi
8th Overall Tour de la Mirabelle

=== Grand Tour general classification results timeline ===
Grand Tour	2010	2011	2012	2013	2014	2015	2016	2017	2018	2019	2020
Giro d'Italia	74	—	—	—	—	49	81	—	—	—	90
Tour de France	Has not contested during his career										
Vuelta a España	Has not contested during his career										

Legend
—	Did not compete
DNF	Did not finish
