= Robert Crowe (cyclist) =

Australian cyclist

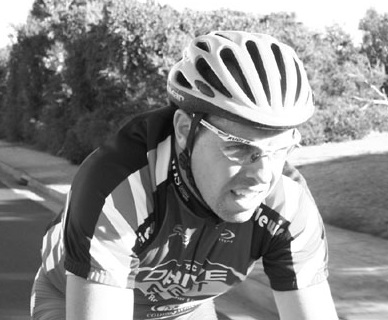
- Rob Crowe riding in the TAC VicRoads 2003 road-safety ambassador cycling kit with 'hazard striping'

Personal information
- Full name: Robert Colville Crowe
- Nationality: Australian
- Born: 19 November 1968 (age 57) Brisbane, Australia
- Height: 188 cm (74 in)
- Weight: 82 kg (181 lb)
Medal record
Men's cycling
Representing Australia
Paralympic Games
Gold medal – first place	2004 Athens	Individual pursuit tandem B1–3
Bronze medal – third place	2004 Athens	Road race/time trial tandem B1–3

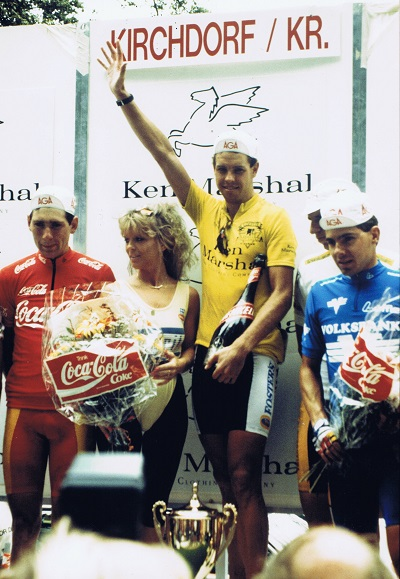
While riding with the Australian Olympic road team, Rob Crowe won the overall title 'yellow jersey' of the Ken Marshal International Amateur Tour of Austria in 1991.

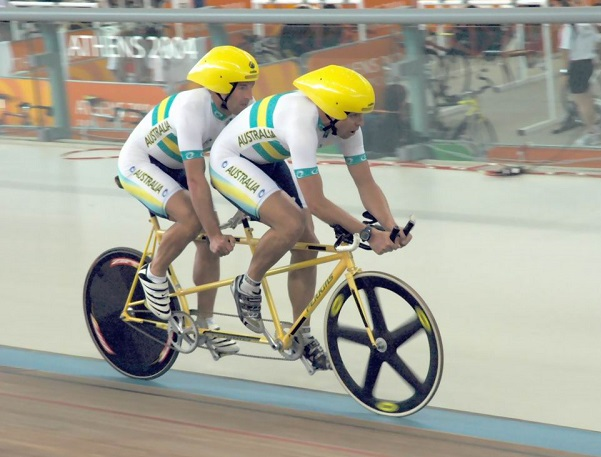
Athens 2004 Paralympic Games Velodrome – Rob Crowe winning the Gold Medal with Kieran Modra in the final of the Men's 4000m Individual Pursuit Tandem B1-3

Robert Colville Crowe, OAM (born 19 November 1968) is an Australian Champion Cyclist who competed in the 1992 Barcelona Olympics and as Kieran Modra's pilot in the 2004 Athens Paralympics. He also directs the popular indoor cycling engine-training school at Ridewiser in Melbourne, Australia.

== Cycling career highlights ==
Highlights of Crowe's career include dual Australian Road Race Championship wins in the 1991 Australian Men's Road Race and 1991 Australian Men's Individual Time Trial, his participation in the men's team time trial at the 1992 Barcelona Olympics, and also his participation as an Australian Paralympic tandem cycling pilot. He piloted Kieran Modra in endurance events, most notably at the 2004 Athens Games. At the games, he won a gold medal in the Men's Individual Pursuit Tandem B1–3 event, in which he and Kieran Modra set a new World Record (4:21.451), and for which he received a Medal of the Order of Australia, and then a bronze medal in the Men's Road Race / Time Trial Tandem B1–3 event. He was an Australian Institute of Sport scholarship-holder training under road cycling coach Heiko Salzwedel during the 2-year training lead-up program in 1991 and 1992 before the Barcelona Olympic Games. He was also part of the team Giant–Australian Institute of Sport.

== Major sporting and career achievements ==
- 1989 Inaugural Winner Mt Buller ABOM Challenge (Amateur)
- 1990 Defending Winner Mt Buller ABOM Challenge (Professional)
- 1991 Selection: Barcelona Target Olympic Road Squad
- 1991 Winner Amateur International, Ken Marshall Tour of Austria
- 1991 Australian Men's Road Race Champion (Gembrook, Victoria)
- 1991 Australian Men's Individual Road Time-trial Champion (Bayles Victoria)
- 1992 Winner 'King of The Mountains' jersey, Tour de Taiwan
- 1992 Barcelona Olympic Cycling Team Time Trial (12th place after a flat tire while seeded second overall)
- 1993 Winner Darling Harbor Criterium, Commonwealth Bank Classic
- 1993 2nd Place Melbourne to Warrnambool Classic
- 1993 Victorian Institute of Sport ‘Athlete of the Month’ (subsequently Public Speaker & Athlete Mentor)
- 1994 Jayco Pro Cycling Team, Aust.
- 1994 General Classification 10th place overall Herald Sun Tour (2nd place, aggregate Sprint Jersey)
- 1995 Sportscover Pro Cycling Team, Aust.
- 1995 Winner 3 x Victorian Road Titles (1991, 1993, 1995)
- 1996–1998 Completion of bachelor's degree – App. Sci. Psychophysiology, Swinburne University of Technology, Hawthorn, Victoria, Australia
- 1999 Australian Institute of Sport (AIS) Athlete Advisor for Sydney Olympic Games (2000)
- 2000 Australian Olympic Committee (AOC), Anti-Drugs in Sport Speaker & Presenter
- 2000 Sports Expert Commentator, SKYNEWS TV Channel, Sydney Olympic Games
- 2002 World Masters M1 Criterium Champion (Docklands, Melbourne)
- 2003 Ridewiser Consultancy – Cycling Education Services (business commenced)
- 2004 Athens Paralympic Games Gold Medallist (pilot) with Kieran Modra in Men's Individual Pursuit Tandem B1–3 event
- 2004 World Record 4000m Tandem Pursuit with Kieran Modra (4mins 21.451)
- 2005 Order of Australia Medal (recognition of contribution to sport) OAM
- 2006 St Kilda Cycling Club – Criterium Champion
- 2009 St Kilda Cycling Club – Criterium Champion
- 2010 Southern Masters Cycling Club – Mass Start Champion
- 2011 Ridewiser Pty Ltd (business re-structured as company)
- 2012 Assigned www.skcc.com.au official Club Pro Training Advisor for road cycling club activities

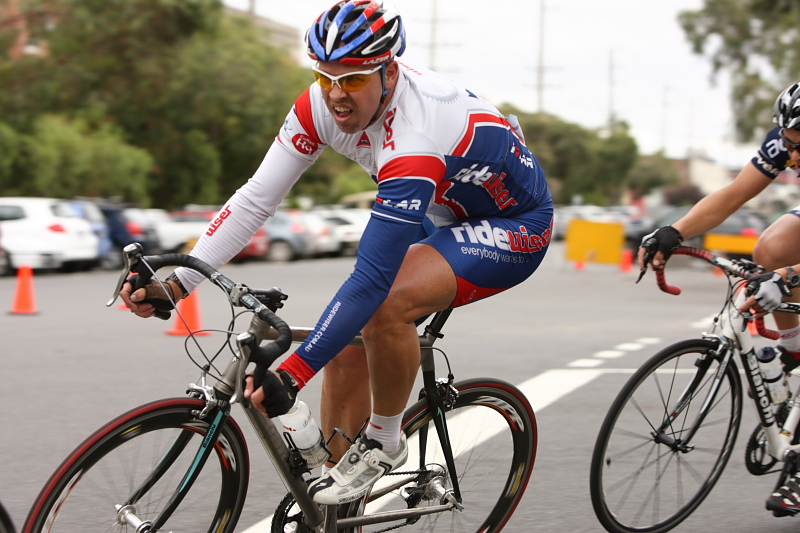
Ridewiser business director Rob Crowe won the St Kilda Cycling Club Criterium Championships in Port Melbourne, 2009
