= Michael Teuber =

German para-cyclist

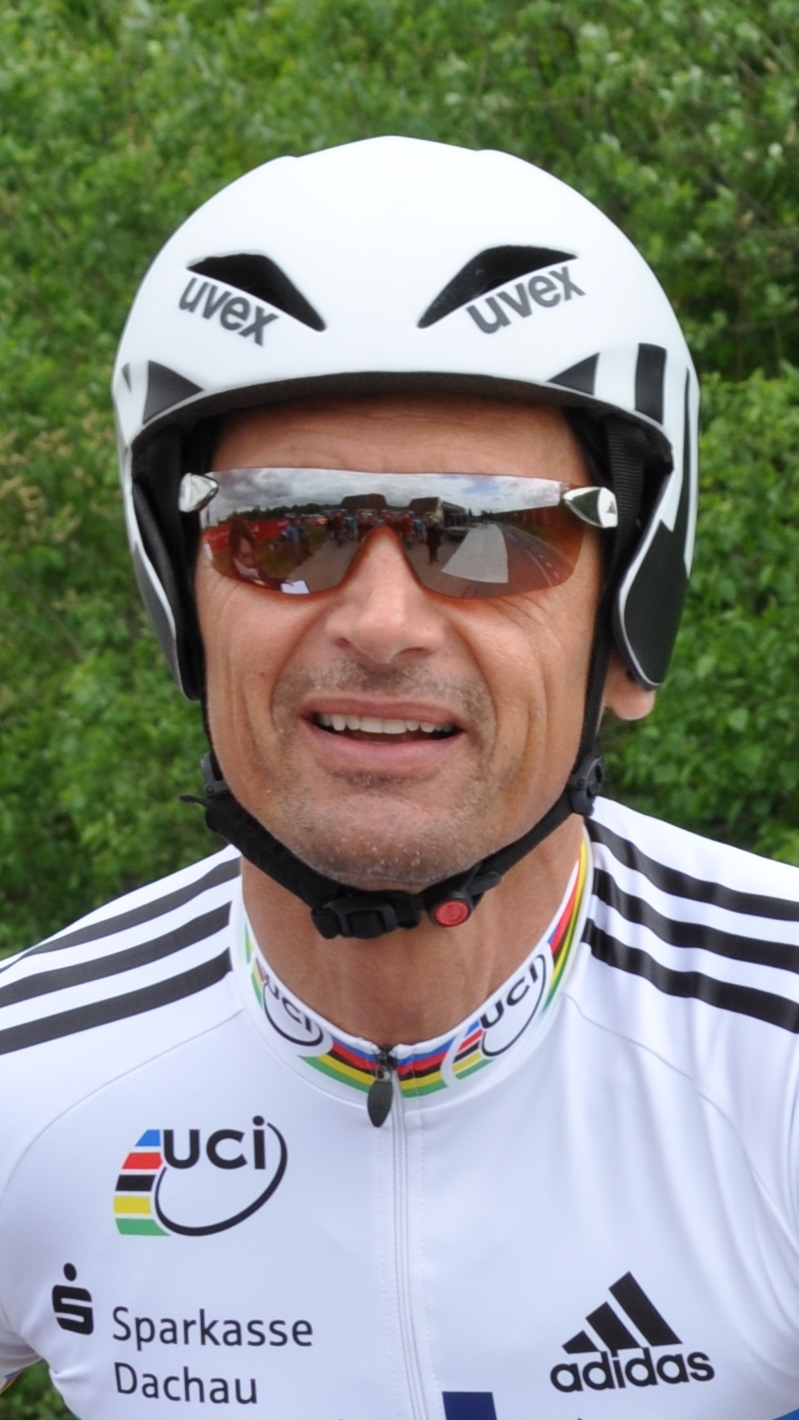
- Teuber in 2016

Personal information
- Nationality: German
- Born: 23 January 1968 (age 58) Tegernsee, West Germany

Sport
- Country: Germany
- Sport: Track and road cycling
- Disability class: C1
- Club: BSV München
Medal record
Men's para-cycling
Representing Germany
Summer Paralympics
Gold medal – first place	2004 Athens	Individual pursuit (LC 4)
Gold medal – first place	2004 Athens	Time trial/Road race (LC4)
Gold medal – first place	2008 Beijing	Road time trial (LC4)
Gold medal – first place	2012 London	Road time trial (C1)
Gold medal – first place	2016 Rio de Janeiro	Road time trial (C1)
Silver medal – second place	2008 Beijing	Individual pursuit (LC 4)
Silver medal – second place	2024 Paris	Road time trial (C1)
Bronze medal – third place	2020 Tokyo	Road time trial (C1)
Road World Championships
Gold medal – first place	2014 Greenville	Time trial (C1)
Gold medal – first place	2015 Nottwil	Time trial (C1)
Gold medal – first place	2022 Baie-Comeau	Time trial (C1)
Silver medal – second place	2013 Baie-Comeau	Time trial (C1)
Silver medal – second place	2013 Baie-Comeau	Road Race (C1)
Silver medal – second place	2014 Greenville	Road race (C1)
Silver medal – second place	2015 Nottwil	Road race (C1)
Silver medal – second place	2023 Glasgow	Time trial (C1)
Bronze medal – third place	2023 Glasgow	Road race (C1)
Bronze medal – third place	2025 Ronse	Road race (C1)

Michael Teuber (born 23 January 1968) is a German para-cyclist competing in C1 classification events. Teuber has represented Germany in four Summer Paralympic Games and is a multiple medal winner in both road and track disciplines. He has been named male German disability Sportsperson of the year on two occasions and is a Laureus World Sports Awards winner.

== Personal history ==
Teuber was born in Tegernsee, Germany in 1968. In August 1987, at the age of 19, he was involved in a car accident in France. The injuries he sustained from that incident resulted in an incomplete paraplegia to the lumbar spine, and complete paralysis below the knee joint. He spent the three years after the accident in a wheelchair.

Teuber was a nominee for the Laureus Award in 2003, 2004, 2008 and 2010. He was named German disability athlete of the year in both 2005 and 2009. He has been twice awarded the Silbernes Lorbeerblatt (Silver Bay Leaf), in 2005 and 2008. He was appointed a Paralympic Ambassador in 2008 by Sir Philip Craven, head of the International Paralympic Committee (IPC). Teuber is married and has one daughter.

== Cycling career ==
Ten years after his accident Teuber competed at his first Paracycling World Championship. In 1998 he took first place in the time trial event at the Road Race World Championship, his first major title. He qualified for the 2000 Summer Paralympics in Sydney, finishing sixth in the Road Race and 7th in the pursuit. Four years later Teuber experienced his most successful Paralympics, securing two gold medals at the 2004 Games in Athens, the Individual pursuit (LC 4) and the Time trial/Road race (LC4). His gold in the Individual Pursuit was almost lost when the day before the race one of his carbon orthoses, that supported his ankles, broke. With no spares it took two technicians working through the night to construct a replacement in time for him to compete.

Success continued at the 2008 Summer Paralympics in Beijing with another two medals, this time a gold in the Road time trial (LC4) and a silver in the Individual pursuit (LC 4), losing to a world record breaking time by Italy's Paolo Viganò. Teuber won a fifth career gold medal in the London Games where he won the Road time trial (C1).

On 30 November 2018 Teuber set a new UCI World Hour Record for the C1 classification of 42.583 km at Velodrom (Berlin).
