= Stéphane Bahier =

French triathlete

Personal information
- Citizenship: France
- Born: May 7, 1975 (age 51) Ernée, France
- Occupation: Triathlete handisport

Sport
- Country: France
- Sport: Paratriathlon
Medal record
Men's paratriathlon
Representing France
World Championships
Gold medal – first place	2012 Auckland	TRI 2
Gold medal – first place	2013 London	TRI 2
Silver medal – second place	2015 Chicago	PT2
Bronze medal – third place	2014 Edmonton	PT2
Bronze medal – third place	2016 Rotterdam	PT2
Bronze medal – third place	2017 Rotterdam	PTS2
European Championships
Silver medal – second place	2015 Geneva	PT2
Silver medal – second place	2016 Lisbon	PT2
Silver medal – second place	2017 Kitzbühel	PTS2
Bronze medal – third place	2014 Kitzbühel	PT2

Stéphane Bahier (born 7 May 1975 in Ernée, France) is a triathlete handisport, France, Europe and World champion, in paratriathlon, TR2/PT2 category.

== Biography ==
Stéphane Bahier has a degree in physical education and he is a professor in the Ministry of Education. He also has a degree in judo and participate in several sports as an amateur, including triathlon, mountain biking, cycling, and cross country up to 2003.

In May 2004, he had a very serious road accident, when his lower members were severely injured. After several important surgeries, he had to have his right leg amputated at his thigh level. In 2005, he went through a re-education program so as to re-assume his sport activities as soon as possible.

He participated at the Beijing Paralympic Games in 2008 as a cyclist running against-the-watch and in line, where he finished in 6th and 7th place, respectively. He was again a member of the French team at the Paralympic Games of Rio in 2016, in paratriathlon, a sport which debuted during these games.

== Prize list ==
Most important results (podium) in national and international paratriathlon circuits since 2012

2016 World championship PT2 Nederlands 3rd place

2016 World championship PT2 Portugal 1st place

2015 World championship PT2 USA 2nd place

2015 France championship PT2 France 1st place

2014 World championship PT2 USA 3rd place

2013 World championship TR2 UK 1st place

2012 World championship TR2 New Zealand 1st place
