= Christian Venge =

Spanish cyclist

Personal information
- Full name: Christian Venge Balboa
- Nationality: Spanish
- Born: 1 December 1972 (age 53) Barcelona, Spain

Sport
- Country: Spain
- Sport: Cycling
Medal record
Men's cycling
Representing Spain
Paralympic Games
Bronze medal – third place	2000 Sydney	Track Individual Pursuit Tandem Open
Silver medal – second place	2004 Athens	Road Race / Time Trial Tandem B1-3
Gold medal – first place	2008 Beijing	Road Individual Time Trial B VI 1-3
Silver medal – second place	2008 Beijing	Track Individual Pursuit B VI 1-3
Gold medal – first place	2012 London	Track Individual Pursuit Tandem Open
European Championships
Bronze medal – third place	2023 Rotterdam	Time trial B

Christian Venge Balboa (born 1 December 1972 in Barcelona) is a cyclist from Spain.

== Personal ==
He has a vision impairment. In 2013, he was awarded the gold Real Orden al Mérito Deportivo.

== Cycling ==
Venge competed at the 2000 Summer Paralympics in cycling. He was the third cyclist to finish in the blind men's Tandem Individual Pursuit track race. He competed at the 2004 Summer Paralympics in cycling. He was the second cyclist to finish in the men's blind Combined Road race. He competed at the 2008 Summer Paralympics in cycling. He was the first cyclist to finish in the Tandem Time Trial Road race. He was the second cyclists to finish in the Tandem Individual Pursuit track race. He competed at the 2012 Summer Paralympics in cycling. He was the first cyclist to finish in the Road Trial race. His pilot for the 2012 Games was David Llaurado. All told, he has earned five Paralympic medals. He also represented the Spain at the 2020 Summer Paralympics held in Tokyo, Japan.

In 2009, while riding with David Llaurado as his pilot, he won a gold medal at the IPC Road Cycling World Championships.

From the Catalan region of Spain, he was a recipient of a 2012 Plan ADO scholarship.
