= Maurice Eckhard =

Spanish cyclist

Personal information
- Full name: Maurice Far Eckhard Tió
- Nationality: Spanish
- Born: 26 July 1983 (age 42) Barcelona, Spain

Sport
- Country: Spain
- Sport: Cycling
Medal record
Men's para-cycling
Representing Spain
European Championships
Bronze medal – third place	2023 Rotterdam	Time trial B
Bronze medal – third place	2023 Rotterdam	Road race B

Maurice Far Eckhard Tió (born 26 July 1983 in Barcelona) is a para-cyclist from Spain.

== Personal ==
Eckhard has cerebral palsy. In 2013, he was awarded the bronze Real Orden al Mérito Deportivo.

== Cycling ==
Eckhard is a C2 type athlete. He competed at the 2004 Summer Paralympics and the 2008 Summer Paralympics in cycling, where he did not earn a medal. He competed at the 2012 Summer Paralympics in cycling. He was the third person to finish in the C2 road trial race.

From the Catalan region of Spain, he was a recipient of a 2012 Plan ADO scholarship. In 2013, he was one of seven Paralympic sportspeople to get a 2013/2014 "Iberdrola Foundation Scholarship" that was awarded by the Spanish Paralympic Committee, Iberdrola Foundation, the Spanish Sports Council and the Spanish Ministry of Social Services and Equality. It provided him with €490 a month for the ten academic months of the year.
