= Wolfgang Eibeck =

Austrian Paralympic cyclist

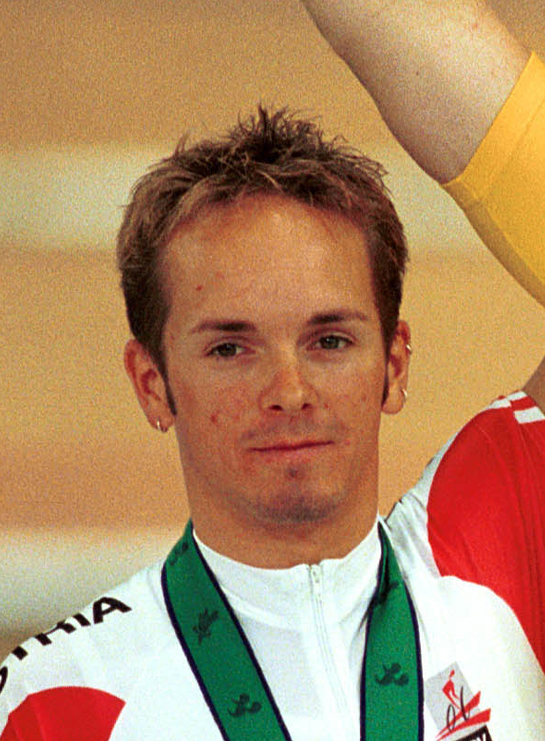
- Eibeck at 2000 Summer Paralympics

Personal information
- Born: 25 December 1972 (age 53) Tulln an der Donau, Austria

Sport
- Country: Austria
- Sport: Paralympic cycling
- Retired: 2019
Medal record
Paralympic cycling
Representing Austria
Paralympic Games
Gold medal – first place	1996 Atlanta	Omnium LC1
Gold medal – first place	2004 Athens	Road race LC1
Silver medal – second place	1992 Barcelona	Road race LC1
Silver medal – second place	2000 Sydney	1km time trial LC1
Silver medal – second place	2000 Sydney	Individual pursuit LC1
Silver medal – second place	2004 Athens	Individual pursuit LC1
Silver medal – second place	2008 Beijing	Individual time trial LC1
World Road Championships
Gold medal – first place	2006 Aigle	Individual time trial LC1
Gold medal – first place	2007 Bordeaux	Individual time trial LC1
Gold medal – first place	2009 Bogogno	Individual time trial LC1
Silver medal – second place	2009 Bogogno	Road race LC1
Silver medal – second place	2014 Greenville	Individual time trial LC1
Silver medal – second place	2017 Pietermaritzburg	Road race C5
Bronze medal – third place	2007 Bordeaux	Road race LC1
World Track Championships
Silver medal – second place	2006 Aigle	Individual pursuit LC1
Silver medal – second place	2006 Aigle	1km time trial LC1
Silver medal – second place	2007 Bordeaux	Individual pursuit LC1
Bronze medal – third place	2007 Bordeaux	1km time trial LC1
Bronze medal – third place	2009 Manchester	Individual pursuit LC1

Wolfgang Eibeck (born 25 December 1972) is an Austrian retired Paralympic cyclist who competes in international cycling competitions. He is a two-time Paralympic champion, seven-time World champion and 11-time European champion and has competed at the Paralympic Games seven times.

Eibeck was inducted into the Lower Austrian Sports Centre Walk of Fame in 2020.
