= Christopher Scott (cyclist) =

Australian Paralympic cyclist

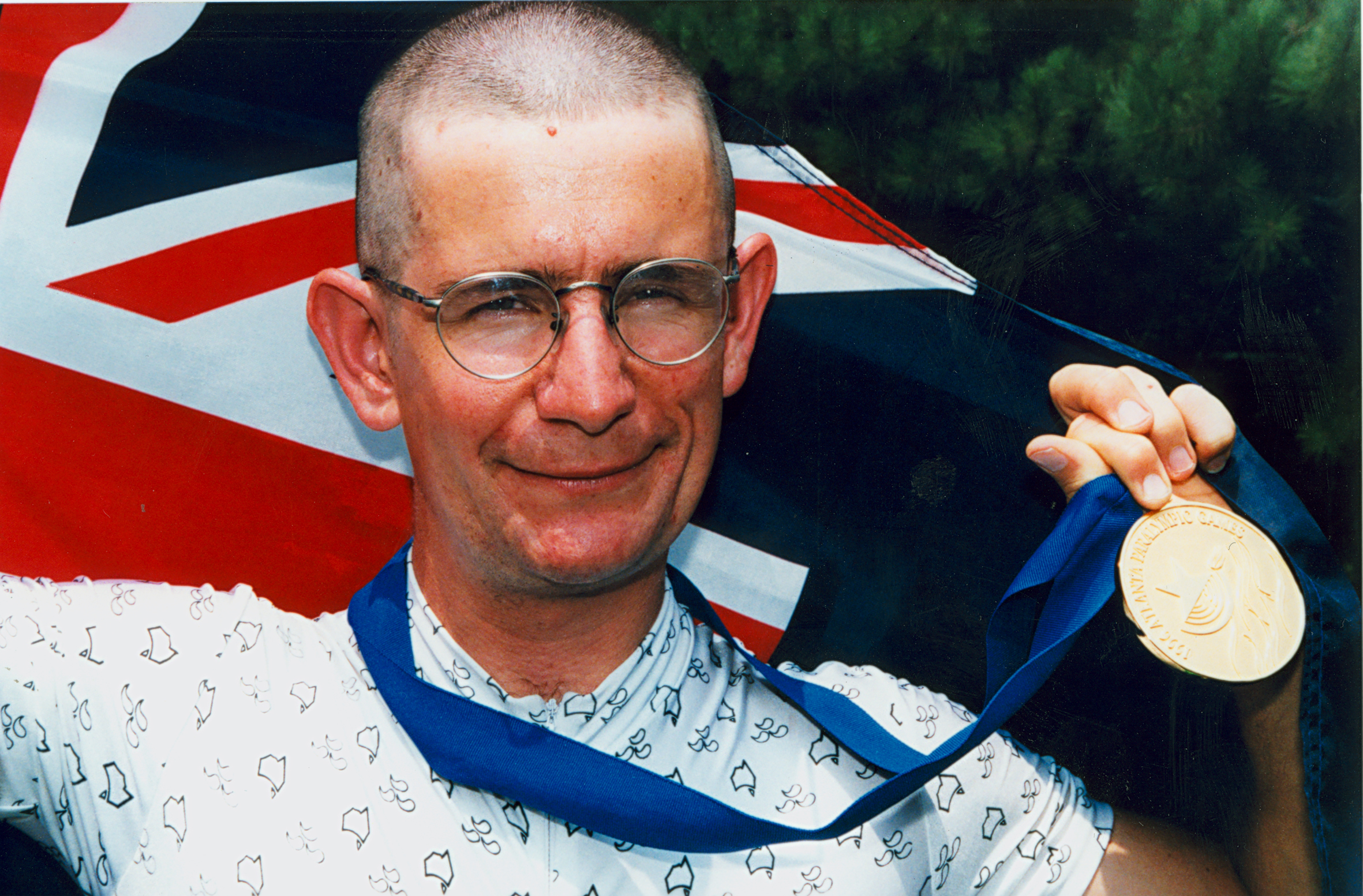

Personal information
- Full name: Christopher Ian Scott
- Nickname: Gecko
- Born: 29 October 1968 (age 58) Gympie, Australia

Cycling career
- Sport: Cycling
- Disciplines: Track & Road
- Role: Rider
Medal record
Men's track cycling
Paralympic Games
Gold medal – first place	1996 Atlanta	Mixed 5,000 m Time Trial Bicycle CP Div 4
Gold medal – first place	2000 Sydney	Mixed Bicycle Time Trial (CP 4)
Gold medal – first place	2004 Athens	Men's Road Race / Time Trial Bicycle CP Div 4
Gold medal – first place	2004 Athens	Men's Individual Pursuit Bicycle CP Div 4
Gold medal – first place	2004 Athens	Men's Team Sprint LC1-4/CP 3/4
Gold medal – first place	2008 Beijing	Men's Individual Pursuit (CP 4)
Silver medal – second place	1996 Atlanta	Mixed 20k Bicycle CP Div 4
Silver medal – second place	2008 Beijing	Men's Individual Time Trial CP4
Bronze medal – third place	2000 Sydney	Mixed Bicycle Road Race (CP 4)
Bronze medal – third place	2008 Beijing	Men's 1km time trial (CP 4)
IPC Para-cycling Track and Road World Championships
Gold medal – first place	2002 Altenstadt	Men' 1000 m Time Trial CP4
Gold medal – first place	2002 Altenstadt	Men' 3000 m Individual Pursuit CP4
Gold medal – first place	2002 Altenstadt	Men' Road Time Trial CP4
Gold medal – first place	2006 Bordeaux	Men' 3000 m Individual Pursuit CP4
Silver medal – second place	2002 Altenstadt	Men' Road Time Race CP4
Silver medal – second place	1998 Colorado Springs	Mixed Individual Pursuit CP4
Silver medal – second place	1998 Colorado Springs	Mixed Time Trial CP4
Silver medal – second place	1994 Hasselt	Men's 5000m CP4
Bronze medal – third place	1994 Hasselt	Men's 20000m CP4
Bronze medal – third place	1998 Colorado Springs	Mixed Road Time Trial CP4
Bronze medal – third place	1998 Colorado Springs	Mixed Road Race CP4
Bronze medal – third place	2006 Bordeaux	Men' 1000 m Time Trial CP4

Christopher Ian Scott, OAM (born 29 October 1968) is a former Australian Paralympic cyclist. He has won ten medals at six Games from 1988 to 2008.

== Personal ==
Scott was born in Gympie, Queensland, with cerebral palsy, as the youngest of three children. and moved to Brisbane with his family when he was two years old. At the age of eight, a soccer coach refused to let him join his team because he could not kick the ball with his right foot as well as he could with his left, a rule not enforced on able-bodied players. He consequently joined the next age group's soccer team so he could play with his brother. Scott attended Salisbury State High School and it was here where he began to participate more in sport and became involved in the Sporting Wheelies and Disabled Association.

He works as a records clerk in the Brisbane suburb of Sunnybank. He has been married to Karen since March 2008 and has a stepdaughter.

== Career ==
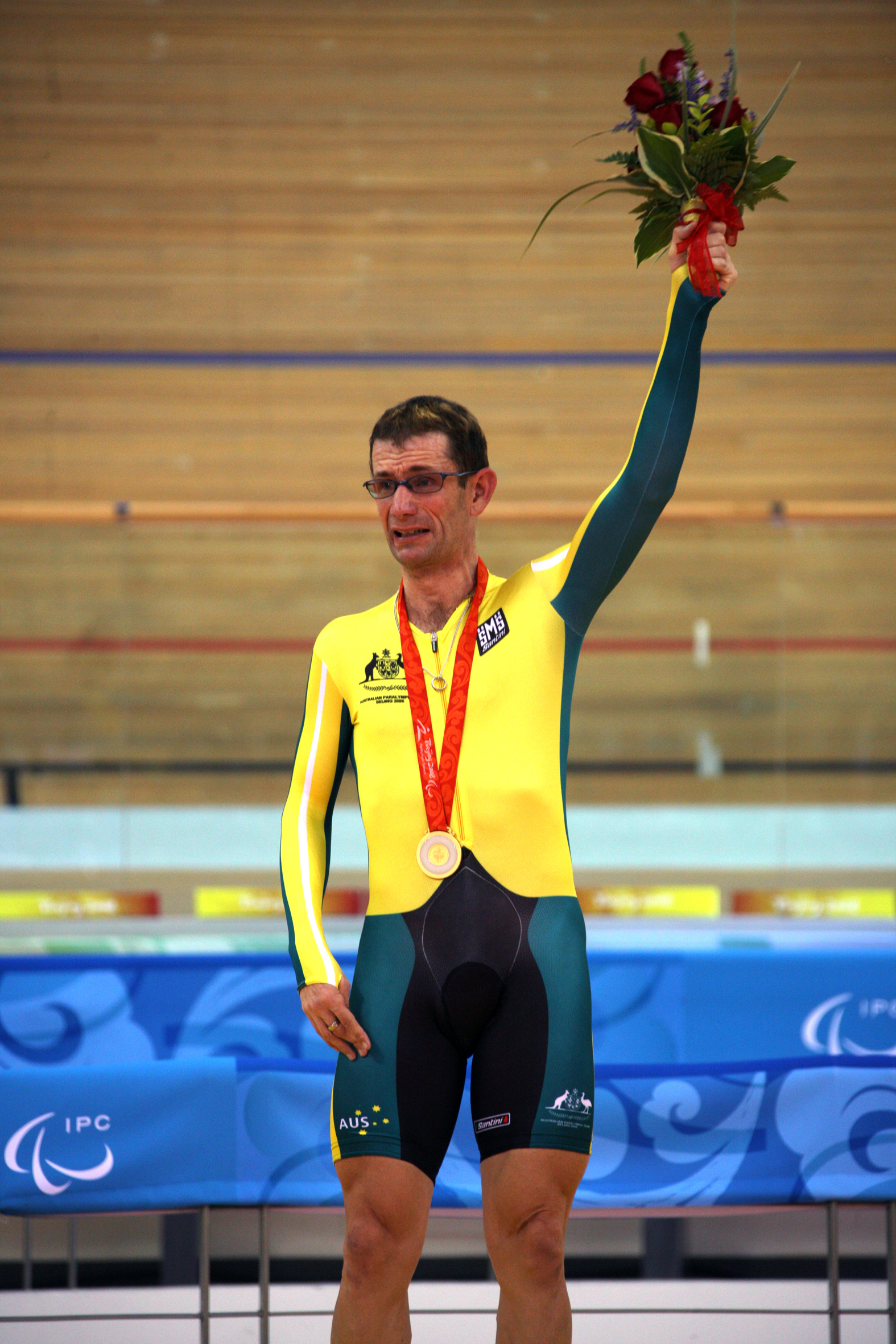
Chris Scott gold medallist individual pursuit at the 2008 Beijing Games

Scott first competed at the Paralympics in 7-a-side Football at the 1988 Seoul Games. He also competed in athletics in the 1992 Paralympics in Barcelona. He switched to cycling due to a broken ankle. At the 1996 Atlanta games, he won a gold medal in the Mixed 5,000 m Time Trial Bicycle CP Div 4 event, and a silver medal in the Mixed 20k Bicycle CP Div 4 event. In 1998 and 1999, he held an Australian Institute of Sport Athlete with a Disability scholarship.

At the 2000 Sydney Paralympics, he won a gold medal in the Mixed Bicycle Time Trial CP Div 4 event and a bronze medal in the Mixed Bicycle Road Race CP Div 4 event. At the 2004 Athens Games, Scott was the male captain for the Australian Paralympic team. In the Men's Team Sprint LC1-4/CP 3/4 event at the 2004 Games, Scott, the captain of the Australian cycling team, relinquished his place in the team in the finals so that fellow cyclist Peter Homann could get a chance to win a gold medal at his last Paralympics; the Australian team won the event so Homann received the gold medal along with Scott and the rest of the team.

In a 2008 interview, he said of this action: "I already had my gold medal. It's what you do in a team. Peter deserved his chance on the podium." He won two further gold medals in the Men's Road Race / Time Trial Bicycle CP Div 4 and Men's Individual Pursuit Bicycle CP Div 4 events at the 2004 Games. At the 2008 Beijing Games, he won a gold medal in the Men's Individual Pursuit CP4 event, a silver medal in the Men's Individual Time Trial CP4 event and a bronze medal in the Men's 1 km Time Trial CP4 event. The year before these Games, he had had back surgery and then was struck down by a car.

He announced his retirement from Paralympic competition in Beijing due to "old age". He has since become an ambassador for the Cerebral Palsy League.

== Recognition ==
In 1997, Scott received a Medal of the Order of Australia for his 1996 Paralympic gold medal. In 2000, Scott received an Australian Sports Medal. He received the Australian Paralympic Committee's Senior Male Athlete award in 2002, and Sporting Wheelie of the Year in 2002 and 2005. He also won the Australian Male Disabled Cyclist of the Year awards for four consecutive years from 2002 to 2005, and was the 2005 Australian Sportsperson of the Year with a Disability. Scott was crowned Queensland Cyclist of the Year in 2008. In 2015, he was inducted into the Queensland Sport Hall of Fame.

In 2011, he was interviewed by Ian Jobling in the Australian Centre for Paralympic Studies oral history project of the National Library of Australia. In 2016, he was inducted into the Cycling Australia Hall of Fame. In 2026, he was inducted into Australian Paralympic Hall of Fame.
