= Anthony Zahn =

American cyclist (1974–2020)

Anthony Zahn (born October 14, 1974 - August 7, 2020) was an American cyclist who won a bronze medal at the 2008 Summer Paralympics in Beijing, China.

Zahn was from Riverside, California. He died on August 7, 2020, of pancreatic cancer at the age of 45.
