= Juan José Méndez =

Spanish cyclist

Personal information
- Full name: Juan José Méndez Fernandez
- Nationality: Spanish
- Born: 27 March 1964 (age 62) Barcelona, Spain

Sport
- Country: Spain
- Sport: Cycling
- Disability class: C1

Achievements and titles
- Paralympic finals: 2004 Athens; 2008 Beijing; 2012 London
Medal record
Men's cycling
Representing Spain
Summer Paralympics
Silver medal – second place	2004 Athens	Pursuit (LC4)
Silver medal – second place	2008 Beijing	Time trial (LC4)
Bronze medal – third place	2008 Beijing	Pursuit (LC4)
Road World Championships
Gold medal – first place	2013 Baie-Comeau	Time trial (C1)
Silver medal – second place	2015 Nottwil	Time trial (C1)

Juan José Méndez Fernandez (born 27 March 1964) is a cyclist from Spain who lost part of his left arm and leg in a motorcycle accident.

== Personal life ==
Méndez was born on 27 March 1964 in Barcelona, and is from the Catalan region of Spain.

== Cycling ==
Méndez is a C1/LC4 classified cyclist.

Méndez competed at the 2004 Summer Paralympics in cycling. He was the number three cyclists to finish in the Road Trial LC4 race. At the 2005 European Road Cycling Championship, he won a pair of silver medals and a bronze medal. At the 2006 Cycling World Road Championships, he won a bronze medal. At the 2007 World Track Cycling Championships, he earned a bronze medal. He competed at the 2008 Summer Paralympics in cycling. He was the number two cyclists to finish in the Road Trial LC4 race. He was the number three cyclists to finish in the Individual Pursuit track LC4 race.

Méndez competed at the 2012 Summer Paralympics in cycling in the Men's Individual C1-2-3 1 km Cycling Time Trial. From the Catalan region of Spain, he was a recipient of a 2012 Plan ADO scholarship. At a two-day para-cycling event in Geneva, Switzerland in December 2013, he finished second in one of the event's races.
