= David Llauradó =

Spanish cyclist

David Llauradó Caldero
Personal information
- Nationality: Spanish

Sport
- Country: Spain
- Sport: Cycling

David Llauradó Caldero is a Spanish Paralympic cycling pilot, who rides at the front of a tandem bicycle. He has competed at the 2008 and 2012 Summer Paralympics.

== Personal ==
Llauradó is from the Catalan region of Spain. In 2013, he was awarded the gold Real Orden al Mérito Deportivo.

== Cycling ==
Llauradó competed at the 2008 Summer Paralympics with Christian Venge Balboa as his pilot. In 2009, while riding as Venge's guide, he won a gold medal at the IPC Road Cycling World Championships. Llaurado competed at the 2012 Summer Paralympics in cycling as a pilot for Christian Venge Balboa. The pair won a gold medal in London. From the Catalan region of Spain, he was a recipient of a 2012 Plan ADO scholarship.
