= Paolo Viganò (cyclist) =

Italian Paralympic cyclist

Personal information
- Born: 12 April 1969 (age 57) Monza, Italy

Sport
- Country: Italy
- Sport: Para Cycling
Medal record
Event	1st	2nd	3rd
Paralympic Games	1	0	0

Paolo Viganò (born 12 April 1969) is a former Italian paralympic cyclist who won a gold medal at the Summer Paralympics.
