= Erich Winkler =

Austrian ice hockey player

- Born: 17 February 1935; Innsbruck, Austria
- Died: 19 June 2017 (aged 82)
- Position: Left wing
- Shot: Left
- National team: Austria
- Playing career: 1959–1964

Erich Winkler (b. 17 February 1935 - d. 19 June 2017) is an Austrian ice hockey player. He competed in the men's tournament at the 1964 Winter Olympics.
