= Antonio García Martínez (cyclist) =

Spanish cyclist

Antonio Garcia
Personal information
- Full name: Antonio Garcia Martinez
- Nationality: Spanish
- Born: 24 December 1956 (age 69) Sevilla, Spain

Sport
- Country: Spain
- Sport: Cycling
Medal record
Men's cycling
Representing Spain
Paralympic Games
Gold medal – first place	2004 Athens	Road race/time trial LC3

Antonio Garcia Martinez (born 24 December 1956 in Sevilla) is a Spanish cyclist. He is LC3 type cyclist. He is a chemical engineer. He competed at the 1996 Summer Paralympics, the 2000 Summer Paralympics, the 2004 Summer Paralympics, and the 2008 Summer Paralympics. He finished first in the Combined Road (Pursuit / Time Trial) LC3 race.
