= Laurent Thirionet =

French Paralympic cyclist

Lauren Thirionet
Personal information
- Born: 22 November 1970 (age 55) Bergues, France

Sport
- Country: France
- Sport: Paralympic cycling
Medal record
Paralympic cycling
Representing France
Paralympic Games
| Gold medal – first place | 2004 Athens | Men's individual pursuit LC3 |
| Gold medal – first place | 2008 Beijing | Men's road time trial LC3 |
| Silver medal – second place | 2000 Sydney | Men's road race LC3 |
| Silver medal – second place | 2004 Athens | Men's road time trial LC3 |
| Silver medal – second place | 2004 Athens | Men's 1km time trial LC1-4 |
| Bronze medal – third place | 2004 Athens | Men's team sprint LC1-4/CP 3/4 |
| Bronze medal – third place | 2012 London | Men's individual pursuit C2 |
UCI Para-cycling World Championships
| Gold medal – first place | 2006 Aigle | Men's individual pursuit LC3 |
| Gold medal – first place | 2006 Aigle | Men's road time trial LC3 |
| Gold medal – first place | 2006 Aigle | Men's road race LC3 |
| Gold medal – first place | 2007 Bordeaux | Men's individual pursuit LC3 |
| Gold medal – first place | 2007 Bordeaux | Men's time trial LC3 |
| Silver medal – second place | 2006 Aigle | Men's 1km time trial LC3 |
| Bronze medal – third place | 2007 Bordeaux | Men's 1km time trial LC1-4 |

Laurent Thirionet (born 22 November 1970) is a retired French Paralympic cyclist who competed in international track cycling and road cycling elite events. He is a five-time World champion and a double Paralympic champion. Thirionet had his left leg amputated above the knee after being involved in a traffic accident in Dunkirk. He started cycling after his accident and won his first medals at the 2000 Summer Paralympics.
