= Cycling at the 2008 Summer Paralympics =

Cycling at the XIII Paralympic Games
- Paralympic Cycling
- Venue: Laoshan Velodrome; Changping Triathlon Venue
- Dates: 7–10 September 2008

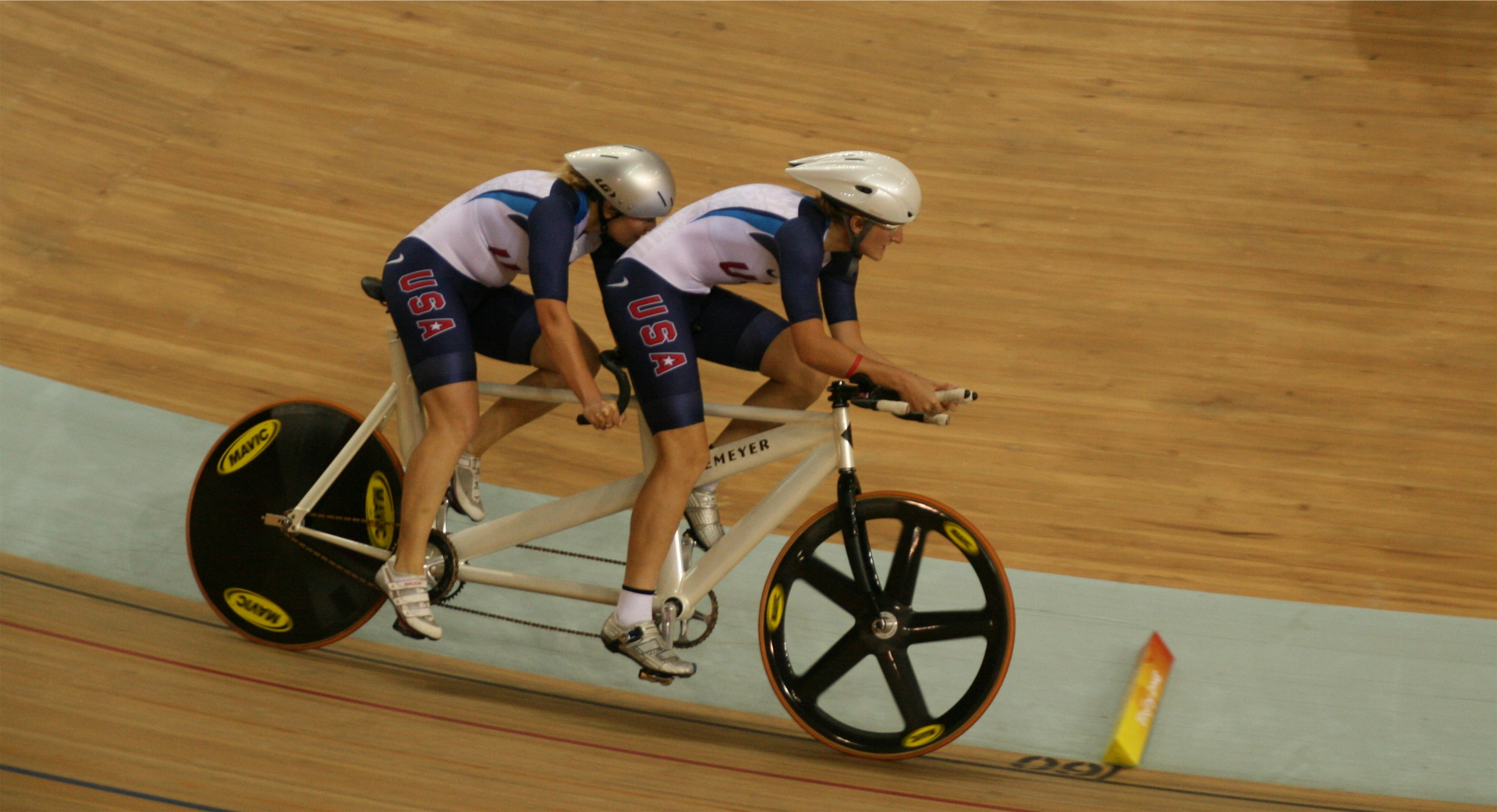
Karissa Whitsell and Mackenzie Woodring (pilot) compete in Beijing on 7 September 2008.

Cycling at the 2008 Summer Paralympics consisted of 44 events in two main disciplines, track cycling and road cycling. Track cycling was held in Laoshan Velodrome on 7–10 September, and road cycling took place at the Changping Triathlon Venue on 12–14 September.

== Classification ==
Cyclists are given a classification depending on the type and extent of their disability. The classification system allows cyclists to compete against others with a similar level of function.

Cycling classes are:

- B&VI 1–3: Blind and visually impaired cyclists
- LC 1–4: Cyclists with a locomotor disability
- CP 1–4: Cyclists with cerebral palsy
- HC A, B, and C: Cyclists using a handcycle

== Events ==
For each of the events below, medals are contested for one or more of the above classifications. After each classification is given the dates that the event will be contested.

Road cycling

- Men's individual road race
  - B&VI 1–3 – 14 September
  - HC B – 14 September
  - HC C – 14 September
  - LC 1–2/CP 4 – 13 September
  - LC 3–4/CP 3 – 13 September
- Men's individual time trial
  - B&VI 1–3 – 12 September
  - CP 3 – 12 September
  - CP 4 – 12 September
  - HC A – 12 September
  - HC B – 12 September
  - HC C – 12 September
  - LC 1 – 12 September
  - LC 2 – 12 September
  - LC 3 – 12 September
  - LC 4 – 12 September
- Women's individual road race
  - B&VI 1–3 – 14 September
  - HC A/B/C – 13 September
- Women's individual time trial
  - B&VI 1–3 – 12 September
  - HC A/B/C – 12 September
  - LC 1–2/CP 4 – 12 September
  - LC 3–4/CP 3 – 12 September
- Mixed individual road race
  - CP 1–2 – 13 September
- Mixed individual time trial
  - CP 1–2 – 12 September

Track cycling

- Men's 1 km time trial
  - B&VI 1–3 – 8 September
  - CP 3 – 9 September
  - CP 4 – 9 September
  - LC 1 – 9 September
  - LC 2 – 9 September
  - LC 3–4 – 7 September
- Men's individual pursuit
  - B&VI 1–3 – 4000 m – 7 September
  - CP 3 – 3000 m – 7 September
  - CP 4 – 3000 m – 7 September
  - LC 1 – 4000 m – 8 September
  - LC 2 – 4000 m – 8 September
  - LC 3 – 9 September
  - LC 4 – 9 September
- Men's individual sprint
  - B&VI 1–3 – 10 September
- Men's team sprint
  - LC 1–4/CP 3–4 – 10 September
- Women's 500m time trial
  - LC1–2/CP 4 – 8 September
  - LC3–4/CP 3 – 8 September
- Women's 1 km time trial
  - B&VI 1–3 – 7 September
- Women's individual pursuit
  - B&VI 1–3 – 9 September
  - LC 1–2/CP 4 – 10 September
  - LC 3–4/CP 3 – 10 September

== Participating countries ==
There were 220 athletes (163 males, 57 females) from 39 nations taking part in this sport.

- Argentina (3)
- Australia (17)
- Austria (11)
- Belarus (6)
- Belgium (3)
- Brazil (2)
- Burkina Faso (1)
- Canada (15)
- China (8)
- Colombia (4)
- Croatia (1)
- Czech Republic (8)
- Denmark (3)
- Finland (2)
- France (9)
- Germany (17)
- Great Britain (12)
- Greece (2)
- Ireland (6)
- Israel (1)
- Italy (9)
- Japan (5)
- Lebanon (1)
- Luxembourg (1)
- Mexico (1)
- Netherlands (6)
- New Zealand (5)
- Norway (1)
- Poland (6)
- Portugal (1)
- Romania (3)
- Slovakia (4)
- Slovenia (1)
- South Africa (7)
- South Korea (2)
- Spain (16)
- Switzerland (5)
- United States (13)
- Venezuela (2)

== Medal summary ==
=== Medal table ===
This ranking sorts countries by the number of gold medals earned by their cyclists (in this context a country is an entity represented by a National Paralympic Committee). The number of silver medals is taken into consideration next and then the number of bronze medals. If, after the above, countries are still tied, equal ranking is given and they are listed alphabetically.

Rank	Nation	Gold	Silver	Bronze	Total
1	Great Britain (GBR)	17	3	0	20
2	United States (USA)	5	5	4	14
3	Germany (GER)	3	6	4	13
4	Australia (AUS)	3	5	7	15
5	Spain (ESP)	3	5	3	11
6	Czech Republic (CZE)	2	2	4	8
7	Italy (ITA)	2	1	3	6
8	Switzerland (SUI)	2	0	0	2
9	Japan (JPN)	1	3	2	6
10	France (FRA)	1	1	2	4
11	South Africa (RSA)	1	1	1	3
12	Austria (AUT)	1	1	0	2
12	Belarus (BLR)	1	1	0	2
14	New Zealand (NZL)	1	0	3	4
15	Poland (POL)	1	0	1	2
16	China (CHN)	0	3	4	7
17	Netherlands (NED)	0	3	0	3
18	South Korea (KOR)	0	1	1	2
19	Finland (FIN)	0	1	0	1
19	Romania (ROU)	0	1	0	1
19	Slovakia (SVK)	0	1	0	1
22	Canada (CAN)	0	0	2	2
22	Lebanon (LIB)	0	0	2	2
24	Belgium (BEL)	0	0	1	1
Totals (24 entries)		44	44	44	132

=== Road cycling ===
==== Men's events ====
Event	Class	Gold	Silver	Bronze
Time trial	Time trial B&VI 1–3	Spain (ESP); Christian Venge; David Llaurado	Netherlands (NED); Alfred Stelleman; Jaco Tettelaar	Poland (POL); Krzysztof Kosikowski; Artur Korc
Time trial	Time trial CP 3	Javier Otxoa; Spain	Darren Kenny; Great Britain	Yong-Sik Jin; South Korea
Time trial	Time trial CP 4	Cesar Neira; Spain	Christopher Scott; Australia	Masashi Ishii; Japan
Time trial	Time trial HC A	Wolfgang Schattauer; Austria	Rastislav Tureček; Slovakia	Alain Quittet; France
Time trial	Time trial HC B	Heinz Frei; Switzerland	Vittorio Podestà; Italy	Edward Maalouf; Lebanon
Time trial	Time trial HC C	Oz Sanchez; United States	José Vicente Arzo; Spain	Alejandro Albor; United States
Time trial	Time trial LC1	Wolfgang Sacher; Germany	Wolfgang Eibeck; Austria	Fabio Triboli; Italy
Time trial	Time trial LC2	Jiří Ježek; Czech Republic	Carol-Eduard Novak; Romania	Roberto Alcaide; Spain
Time trial	Time trial LC3	Laurent Thirionet; France	Simon Richardson; Great Britain	Masaki Fujita; Japan
Time trial	Time trial LC4	Michael Teuber; Germany	Juan José Méndez Fernández; Spain	Anthony Zahn; United States
Road race	Road race B&VI 1–3	Poland (POL); Andrzej Zajac; Dariusz Flak	Finland (FIN); Jarmo Ollanketo; Marko Tormanen	France (FRA); Olivier Donval; John Saccomandi
Road race	Road race HC B	Heinz Frei; Switzerland	Max Weber; Germany	Edward Maalouf; Lebanon
Road race	Road race HC C	Ernst van Dyk; South Africa	Alejandro Albor; United States	Oz Sanchez; United States
Road race	Road race LC 1–2/CP 4	Fabio Triboli; Italy	David Mercier; France	Michael Gallagher; Australia
Road race	Road race LC 3–4/CP 3	Darren Kenny; Great Britain	Javier Otxoa; Spain	Tomas Kvasnicka; Czech Republic

==== Women's events ====
Event	Class	Gold	Silver	Bronze
Time trial	Time trial B&VI 1–3	United States (USA); Karissa Whitsell; Mackenzie Woodring	Belarus (BLR); Iryna Fiadotava; Alena Drazdova	New Zealand (NZL); Jayne Parsons; Annaliisa Farrell
Time trial	Time trial HC A/B/C	Rachel Morris; Great Britain	Monique van der Vorst; Netherlands	Dorothee Vieth; Germany
Time trial	Time trial LC 1–2/CP 4	Sarah Storey; Great Britain	Jennifer Schuble; United States	Jufang Zhou; China
Time trial	Time trial LC 3–4/CP 3	Barbara Buchan; United States	Allison Jones; United States	Paula Tesoriero; New Zealand
Road race	Road race B&VI 1–3	Belarus (BLR); Iryna Fiadotava; Alena Drazdova	United States (USA); Karissa Whitsell; Mackenzie Woodring	Canada (CAN); Genevieve Ouellet; Mathilde Hupin
Road race	Road race HC A/B/C	Andrea Eskau; Germany	Monique van der Vorst; Netherlands	Dorothee Vieth; Germany

==== Mixed events ====
Event	Class	Gold	Silver	Bronze
Time trial	Time trial CP 1–2	David Stone; Great Britain	Barbara Weise; Germany	Marketa Mackova; Czech Republic
Road race	Road race CP 1–2	David Stone; Great Britain	Riaan Nel; South Africa	Giorgio Farroni; Italy

=== Track cycling ===
==== Men's events ====
Event	Class	Gold	Silver	Bronze
Time trial	1 km time trial (B&VI 1–3)	Great Britain (GBR); Anthony Kappes; Barney Storey	Australia (AUS); Ben Demery; Shaun Hopkins	Australia (AUS); Kieran Modra; Tyson Lawrence
Time trial	1 km time trial (CP 3)	Darren Kenny; Great Britain	Rik Waddon; Great Britain	Tomas Kvasnicka; Czech Republic
Time trial	1 km time trial (CP 4)	Masashi Ishii; Japan	Jiri Bouska; Czech Republic	Christopher Scott; Australia
Time trial	1 km time trial (LC 1)	Mark Bristow; Great Britain	Kuidong Zhang; China	Wolfgang Sacher; Germany
Time trial	1 km time trial (LC 2)	Jody Cundy; Great Britain	Jiří Ježek; Czech Republic	Yuanchao Zheng; China
Time trial	1 km time trial (LC 3–4)	Simon Richardson; Great Britain	Masaki Fujita; Japan	Greg Ball; Australia
Individual pursuit	Individual pursuit (B&VI 1–3)	Australia (AUS); Kieran Modra; Tyson Lawrence	Spain (ESP); Christian Venge; David Llaurado	Australia (AUS); Bryce Lindores; Steven George
Individual pursuit	Individual pursuit (CP 3)	Darren Kenny; Great Britain	Yong-Sik Jin; South Korea	Jean Quevillon; Canada
Individual pursuit	Individual pursuit (CP 4)	Christopher Scott; Australia	Masashi Ishii; Japan	Cesar Neira; Spain
Individual pursuit	Individual pursuit (LC 1)	Michael Gallagher; Australia	Wolfgang Sacher; Germany	Fabio Triboli; Italy
Individual pursuit	Individual pursuit (LC 2)	Jiří Ježek; Czech Republic	Roberto Alcaide; Spain	Jan Boyen; Belgium
Individual pursuit	Individual pursuit (LC 3)	Simon Richardson; Great Britain	Masaki Fujita; Japan	Tobias Graf; Germany
Individual pursuit	Individual pursuit (LC 4)	Paolo Viganò; Italy	Michael Teuber; Germany	Juan José Mendez; Spain
Sprint	Sprint (B&VI 1–3)	Great Britain (GBR); Anthony Kappes; Barney Storey	Australia (AUS); Ben Demery; Shaun Hopkins	South Africa (RSA); Gavin Kilpatrick; Michael Thomson
Sprint	Team sprint (LC1–4 CP3/4)	Great Britain (GBR); Darren Kenny; Mark Bristow; Jody Cundy	China (CHN); Kuidong Zhang; Yuanchao Zheng; Zhang Lu	Czech Republic (CZE); Tomas Kvasnicka; Jiri Bouska; Jiří Ježek

==== Women's events ====
Event	Class	Gold	Silver	Bronze
Time trial	500m time trial (LC1–2/CP 4)	Jennifer Schuble; United States	Ye Yaping; China	Dong Jingping; China
Time trial	500m time trial (LC3–4/CP 3)	Paula Tesoriero; New Zealand	Natalie Simanowski; Germany	Jayme Paris; Australia
Time trial	1 km time trial (B&VI 1–3)	Great Britain (GBR); Aileen McGlynn; Ellen Hunter	Australia (AUS); Felicity Johnson; Katie Parker	Australia (AUS); Lindy Hou; Toireasa Gallagher
Individual pursuit	Individual pursuit (B&VI 1–3)	Great Britain (GBR); Aileen McGlynn; Ellen Hunter	Australia (AUS); Lindy Hou; Toireasa Gallagher	United States (USA); Karissa Whitsell; Mackenzie Woodring
Individual pursuit	Individual pursuit (LC 1–2/CP 4)	Sarah Storey; Great Britain	Jennifer Schuble; United States	Jingping Dong; China
Individual pursuit	Individual pursuit (LC 3–4/CP 3)	Barbara Buchan; United States	Natalie Simanowski; Germany	Paula Tesoriero; New Zealand

== See also ==
- Cycling at the 2008 Summer Olympics
