= Cycling at the 2008 Summer Paralympics – Men's road race =

The Men's individual road race events at the 2008 Summer Paralympics took place on September 13–14 at the Changping Triathlon Venue.

== Handcycle classes ==
=== HC B ===
The Men's individual road race HC B event took place on September 14. The race distance was 48.4 km.

Gold	Silver	Bronze
Heinz Frei; Switzerland	Max Weber; Germany	Edward Maalouf; Lebanon

Rank	Name	Time	Time behind	Avg. speed
1	Heinz Frei (SUI)	1:28:25		32.844
2	Max Weber (GER)	1:28:26	+0:01	
3	Edward Maalouf (LIB)	1:28:26	+0:01	
4	Manfred Putz (AUT)	1:28:31	+0:06	
5	Vittorio Podesta (ITA)	1:28:41	+0:16	
6	Tobias Knecht (GER)	1:30:24	+1:59	
7	Lukas Weber (SUI)	1:30:24	+1:59	
8	Radovan Civis (CZE)	1:31:56	+3:31	
9	Rico Morneau (CAN)	1:32:09	+3:44	
10	Matt Updike (USA)	1:32:17	+3:52	
11	Mark Beggs (CAN)	1:32:37	+4:12	
12	Stefan Baumann (GER)	1:36:36	+8:11	
13	Cho Hang-duk (KOR)	1:38:09	+9:44	
14	David Lee (USA)	1:38:09	+9:44	
	Marcel Pipek (CZE)	DNF		

=== HC C ===
The Men's individual road race HC C event took place on September 14. The race distance was 48.4 km.

Gold	Silver	Bronze
Ernst van Dyk; South Africa	Alejandro Albor; United States	Oz Sanchez; United States

Rank	Name	Time	Time behind	Avg. speed
1	Ernst van Dyk (RSA)	1:21:40	-	35.559
2	Alejandro Albor (USA)	1:21:41	+0:01	
3	Oz Sanchez (USA)	1:21:41	+0:01	
4	Jose Vicente Arzo (ESP)	1:26:11	+4:31	
5	Elmar Sternath (AUT)	1:27:35	+5:55	
6	Norbert Mosandl (GER)	1:29:31	+7:51	
7	Don van der Linden (NED)	1:31:48	+10:08	
8	Franz Nietlispach (SUI)	1:33:49	+12:09	
9	Peter Lorkowski (LUX)	1:34:04	+12:24	
10	Norbert Koch (GER)	1:42:46	+21:06	
11	Lassane Gasbeogo (BUR)	1:44:09	+22:29	

== Cerebral palsy /locomotor disability classes ==
=== LC 1/LC 2/CP 4 ===
The Men's individual road race LC 1/LC 2/CP 4 event took place on September 13. The race distance was 72.6 km.

Gold	Silver	Bronze
Fabio Triboli; Italy	David Mercier; France	Michael Gallagher; Australia

Rank	Name	Time	Time behind	Avg. speed
1	Fabio Triboli (ITA)	1:46:03		41.074
2	David Mercier (FRA)	1:46:03		
3	Michael Gallagher (AUS)	1:46:03		
4	Jan Boyen (BEL)	1:46:03		
5	Jiri Bouska (CZE)	1:46:13	+0:10	
6	Soelito Gohr (BRA)	1:46:13	+0:10	
7	Wolfgang Eibeck (AUT)	1:46:13	+0:10	
8	Roberto Alcaide (ESP)	1:46:13	+0:10	
9	Klaus Lungershausen (GER)	1:46:13	+0:10	
10	Cesar Neira (ESP)	1:46:13	+0:10	
11	Ivan Renggli (SUI)	1:46:13	+0:10	
12	Jiří Ježek (CZE)	1:46:18	+0:15	
13	Patrik Chlebo (SVK)	1:46:18	+0:15	
14	Christopher Scott (AUS)	1:46:18	+0:15	
15	Damien Severi (FRA)	1:47:05	+1:02	
16	Pierpaolo Addesi (ITA)	1:47:18	+1:15	
17	Wolfgang Sacher (GER)	1:48:47	+2:44	
18	Morten Jahr (NOR)	1:50:15	+4:12	
19	Luis Chacon (COL)	1:56:17	+10:14	
20	Zheng Yuanchao (CHN)	1:59:00	+12:57	
21	Zhang Kuidong (CHN)	1:59:05	+13:02	
22	Kennedy Jacome (COL)	2:00:34	+14:31	
23	Janos Plekker (RSA)	2:01:23	+15:20	
24	Mark Bristow (GBR)	2:01:44	+15:41	
25	Ron Williams (USA)	2:01:44	+15:41	
26	Tomislav Zadro (CRO)	2:01:44	+15:41	
27	David Kuster (SLO)	2:01:50	+15:47	
28	Michael Farrell (USA)	2:01:58	+15:55	
29	Ioannis Kalaitzakis (GRE)	2:02:21	+16:18	
30	Carol Eduard Novak (ROU)	2:02:21	+16:18	
31	Amador Granado (ESP)	2:03:02	+16:59	
	Eric Bourgault (CAN)	DNF		
	Lubos Jirka (CZE)	DNF		
	Cathal Gustavus Miller (IRL)	DNF		
	Enda Smyth (IRL)	DNF		
	Masashi Ishii (JPN)	DNF		
	Manfred Gattringer (AUT)	DNS		
	Mark Breton (CAN)	DNS		

=== LC 3/LC 4/CP 3 ===
The Men's individual road race LC 3/LC 4/CP 3 event took place on September 13. The race distance was 60.5 km.

Gold	Silver	Bronze
Darren Kenny; Great Britain	Javier Ochoa; Spain	Tomas Kvasnicka; Czech Republic

Rank	Name	Time	Time behind	Avg. speed
1	Darren Kenny (GBR)	1:37:00		37.417
2	Javier Ochoa (ESP)	1:37:02	+0:02	
3	Tomas Kvasnicka (CZE)	1:38:01	+1:01	
4	Tobias Graf (GER)	1:38:01	+1:01	
5	Antonio García (ESP)	1:38:01	+1:01	
6	Laurent Thirionet (FRA)	1:38:01	+1:01	
7	Stephane Bahier (FRA)	1:38:01	+1:01	
8	Maurice Far Eckhard (ESP)	1:38:03	+1:03	
9	Jin Yong-sik (KOR)	1:38:13	+1:13	
10	Simon Richardson (GBR)	1:39:14	+2:14	
11	Zhang Lu (CHN)	1:39:15	+2:15	
12	Victor Garrido (VEN)	1:39:15	+2:15	
13	Erich Stauffer (AUT)	1:39:15	+2:15	
14	Flaviano Carvalho (BRA)	1:39:15	+2:15	
15	Alexander Hohlrieder (AUT)	1:39:15	+2:15	
16	Cirio Molina (VEN)	1:39:15	+2:15	
17	Michael Teuber (GER)	1:39:15	+2:15	
18	Juan Jose Mendez (ESP)	1:41:03	+4:03	
19	Masaki Fujita (JPN)	1:41:03	+4:03	
20	Pierre Senska (GER)	1:47:03	+10:03	
21	Michael Milton (AUS)	1:49:29	+12:29	
22	Augusto Pereira (POR)	1:49:37	+12:37	
23	Rodrigo López (ARG)	1:52:50	+15:50	
24	Jean Quevillon (CAN)	1:54:03	+17:03	
25	Erich Winkler (GER)	1:55:40	+18:40	
26	Anthony Zahn (USA)	1:58:19	+21:19	
27	Brayden McDougall (CAN)	1:59:13	+22:13	
	Wolfgang Dabernig (AUT)	DNF		
	Fabrizio Macchi (ITA)	DNF		
	Paolo Vigano (ITA)	DNS		

== Blind & visually impaired class ==
=== B&VI 1-3 ===
The Men's individual road race B&VI 1-3 event took place on September 13. The race distance was 96.8 km.

Gold	Silver	Bronze
Zajac/Flak; Poland	Ollanketo/Tormanen; Finland	Donval/Saccomandi; France

Rank	Name	Time	Time behind	Avg. speed
1	Zajac/Flak (POL)	2:14:44	-	43.107
2	Ollanketo/Tormanen (FIN)	2:14:45	+0:01	
3	Donval/Saccomandi (FRA)	2:14:49	+0:05	
4	Janovjak/Mitosinka (SVK)	2:16:54	+2:10	
5	Kosikowski/Korc (POL)	2:17:53	+3:09	
6	Cote/Boily (CAN)	2:17:53	+3:09	
7	Chalifour/Cloutier (CAN)	2:18:04	+3:20	
8	Venge/Llaurado (ESP)	2:18:06	+3:22	
9	Gonzalez/Suarez (ESP)	2:18:06	+3:22	
10	Eymard/Godimus (BEL)	2:23:17	+8:33	
11	Modra/Lawrence (AUS)	2:24:55	+10:11	
12	Kilpatrick/Thomson (RSA)	2:29:18	+14:34	
13	Oshiro/Takahashi (JPN)	2:29:18	+14:34	
14	Madsen/Soerensen (DEN)	2:29:21	+14:37	
15	Cowie/Smibert (CAN)	2:29:27	+14:43	
16	Delaney/Peelo (IRL)	2:29:32	+14:48	
	Butu/Ruzsa (ROU)	DNF	OVL	
	Nattkemper/Ferrari (ARG)	DNF	OVL	
	Stelleman/Tettelaar (NED)	DNF		
	Lindores/George (AUS)	DNF		
	Shaptsiaboi/Piutsevich (BLR)	DNF		
	Arciniegas/Carreno (COL)	DNS		

Legend: DNF = Did Not Finish; DNS = Did Not Start; OVL = Overlapped.
