= Cycling at the 2008 Summer Paralympics – Men's time trial =

The Men's 1 km time trial track cycling events at the 2008 Summer Paralympics took place on September 7–9 at the Laoshan Velodrome.

== Classification ==
Cyclists are given a classification depending on the type and extent of their disability. The classification system allows cyclists to compete against others with a similar level of function.

Cycling classes are:

- B&VI 1–3: Blind and visually impaired cyclists
- LC 1–4: Cyclists with a locomotor disability
- CP 1–4: Cyclists with cerebral palsy

== B&VI 1–3 ==
The men's 1 km time trial (B&VI 1–3) took place on September 8.

WR = World Record

Rank	Name	Country	Time
1st place, gold medalist(s)	Anthony Kappes; Pilot: Barney Storey	Great Britain	1:02.864 WR
2nd place, silver medalist(s)	Ben Demery; Pilot: Shaun Hopkins	Australia	1:03.718
3rd place, bronze medalist(s)	Kieran Modra; Pilot: Tyson Lawrence	Australia	1:04.053
4	Gavin Kilpatrick; Pilot: Michael Thomson	South Africa	1:04.130
5	Tatsuyuki Oshiro; Pilot: Hitosh Takahashi	Japan	1:04.593
6	Bryce Lindores; Pilot: Steven George	Australia	1:04.792
7	Daniel Chalifour; Pilot: Alexandre Cloutier	Canada	1:06.371
8	Brian Cowie; Pilot: Marina Girona	Canada	1:07.721
9	Francisco González; Pilot: Juan Francisco Suarez	Spain	1:08.260
10	Michael Delaney; Pilot: David Patrick Peelo	Ireland	1:08.593
11	Carlos Arciniegas; Pilot: Juan Carreno	Colombia	1:08.867
12	Alfred Stelleman; Pilot: Jaco Tettelaar	Netherlands	1:09.077
13	Stephane Cote; Pilot: Pierre-Olivier Boily	Canada	1:10.292
14	Olivier Donval; Pilot: John Saccamandi	France	1:10.667
15	Lujan Nattkemper; Pilot: Juan Ferrari (cyclist)	Argentina	1:14.483
16	Arnold Csaba Butu; Pilot: Lehel Ruzsa	Romania	1:22.296

== CP 3 ==
The men's 1 km time trial (CP 3) took place on September 9 September.

WR = World Record

Rank	Name	Country	Time
1st place, gold medalist(s)	Darren Kenny	Great Britain	1.08.67 WR
2nd place, silver medalist(s)	Rik Waddon	Great Britain	1.11.16
3rd place, bronze medalist(s)	Tomas Kvasnicka	Czech Republic	1.17.67
4	Javier Ochoa	Spain	1.18.52
5	Rodrigo Lopez	Argentina	1.20.57
6	Jean Quevillon	Canada	1.21.35
7	Brayden Mcdougall	Canada	1.22.78
8	Maurice Far Eckhard	Spain	1.27.45

== CP 4 ==
The men's 1 km time trial (CP 4) took place on 9 September.

WR = World Record

Rank	Name	Country	Time
1st place, gold medalist(s)	Masashi Ishii	Japan	1.08.77 WR
2nd place, silver medalist(s)	Jiri Bouska	Czech Republic	1.11.19
3rd place, bronze medalist(s)	Christopher Scott	Australia	1.12.23
4	Cesar Neira	Spain	1.15.39
5	Janos Plekker	South Africa	1.15.55
6	Lubos Jirka	Czech Republic	1.16.01
7	Enda Smyth	Ireland	1.16.07
8	Michael Farrell	United States	1.17.59

== LC 1 ==
The men's 1 km time trial (LC 1) took place on 9 September.

WR = World Record

Rank	Name	Country	Time
1st place, gold medalist(s)	Mark Bristow	Great Britain	1.08.87 WR
2nd place, silver medalist(s)	Kuidong Zhang	China	1.10.47
3rd place, bronze medalist(s)	Wolfgang Sacher	Germany	1.10.81
4	Michael Gallagher	Australia	1.11.01
5	Wolfgang Eibeck	Austria	1.11.24
6	Mario Hammer	Germany	1.11.34
7	Cathal Gustavus Miller	Ireland	1.11.82
8	Manfred Gattringer	Austria	1.12.17
9	Soelito Gohr	Brazil	1.13.56
10	Ivan Renggli	Switzerland	1.13.73
11	Kennedy Jacome	Colombia	1.14.69
12	Ioannis Kalaitzakis	Greece	1.16.45
13	Damien Severi	France	1.17.22
14	Mark Breton	Canada	1.17.59

== LC 2 ==
The men's 1 km time trial (LC 2) took place on 9 September.

WR = World Record

Rank	Name	Country	Time
1st place, gold medalist(s)	Jody Cundy	Great Britain	1.05.47 WR
2nd place, silver medalist(s)	Jiří Ježek	Czech Republic	1.11.18
3rd place, bronze medalist(s)	Yuanchao Zheng	China	1.11.20
4	Carol-Eduard Novak	Romania	1.12.74
5	Amador Granado	Spain	1.12.76
6	Eric Bourgault	Canada	1.14.39
7	Jan Boyen	Belgium	1.14.88
8	Roberto Alcaide	Spain	1.16.06
9	Luis Chacon	Colombia	1.16.92
10	Morten Jahr	Norway	1.17.05
11	David Kuster	Slovenia	1.19.76

== LC 3–4 ==
The men's 1 km time trial (LC 3–4) took place on 7 September.

Rank	Name	Country	Time
1st place, gold medalist(s)	Simon Richardson	Great Britain	1:14.9
2nd place, silver medalist(s)	Maskai Fujita	Japan	+0.02.4
3rd place, bronze medalist(s)	Greg Ball	Australia	+0.02.8
4	Paolo Vigano	Italy	
5	Tobias Graf	Germany	+0.03.6
6	Zhang Lu	China	+0.03.7
7	Michael Teuber	Germany	+0.04.0
8	Laurent Thirionet	France	+0.05.7
9	Michael Milton	Australia	+0.06.7
10	Antonio Garcia	Spain	+0.07.1
11	Stephane Bahier	France	+0.07.6
12	Erich Winkle	Germany	+0.08.1
13	Pierre Seka	Germany	+0.08.5
14	Alexander Hohlrieder	Austria	+0.09.0
15	Juan José Méndez	Spain	+0.09.7
16	Victor Garrido	Venezuela	+0.12.2
17	Wolfgang Dabernig	Austria	+0.13.0
18	Erich Stauffer	Austria	
19	Flaviano Carvalho	Brazil	+0.14.1
20	Anthony Zahn	United States	+0.14.4
