= 2011 UCI Para-cycling Track World Championships – Mixed team sprint =

Rainbow jersey

The Men's team sprint at the 2011 UCI Para-cycling Track World Championships was held on March 13.

15 nations of 3 cyclists each participated in the contest. After the qualifying, the fastest 2 teams raced for gold, and 3rd and 4th teams raced for bronze.

== Results ==
=== Qualifying ===
Rank	Name	Nation	Time	Notes
1	Terry Byrne; Jody Cundy; Darren Kenny	United Kingdom	49.809	WR
2	Xiaofei Ji; Zhang Lu; Yuan Chao Zheng	China	51.655	
3	Jiri Bouska; Jiří Ježek; Tomas Kvasnicka	Czech Republic	52.838	
4	William Chesebro; Samuel Kavanagh; Aaron Trent	United States	53.038	
5	Mario Hammer; Wolfgang Sacher; Pierre Senska	Germany	54.154	
6	Antonio Garcia Martinez; Amador Granados Alkorta; Pablo Jaramillo Gallardo	Spain	55.214	
7	Roberto Bargna; Gianluca Fantoni; Michele Pittacolo	Italy	56.660	
8	Michael T. Gallagher; Andrew Panazzolo; Susan Powell	Australia	56.955	
9	Stephan Herholdt; Janos Plekker; Roxanne Burns	South Africa	57.513	
10	Christopher Burns; Colin Lynch; Cathal Miller	Ireland	58.136	
11	Stephen Hills; Christopher Ross; Nathan Smith	New Zealand	58.375	
12	Diego Germán Dueñas Gómez; Alvaro Galvis Becerra; Edwin Fabián Mátiz Ruiz	Colombia	58.735	
13	Arslan Gilmutdinov; Pavel Komotskiy; Alexey Obydennov	Russia	1:00.162	
	Carol-Eduard Novak; Attila Olah; Imre Torok	Romania	DSQ	
	Bastiaan Gruppen; Teun Kruijff; Gijs van Butselaar	Netherlands	DSQ	

=== Finals ===
Rank	Name	Nation	Time
Gold Medal Race
1st place, gold medalist(s)	Terry Byrne; Jody Cundy; Darren Kenny	United Kingdom	49.540
2nd place, silver medalist(s)	Xiaofei Ji; Zhang Lu; Yuan Chao Zheng	China	51.771
Bronze Medal Race
3rd place, bronze medalist(s)	Jiri Bouska; Jiří Ježek; Tomas Kvasnicka	Czech Republic	52.290
4	William Chesebro; Samuel Kavanagh; Aaron Trent	United States	52.985
