= 2011 UCI Para-cycling Track World Championships – Men's sprint =

Rainbow jersey

The men's sprint at the 2011 UCI Para-cycling Track World Championships was held on March 13.

48 athletes participated in the contest. After the qualifying heats, the fastest 8 riders advanced to the Quarterfinals.

The first rider in each quarterfinal advanced to the semifinals and the 4 losing athletes raced for 5th-8th place.

== Results ==
=== Qualifying ===
Rank	Name	Nation	Time	Notes
1	Neil Fachie; Craig MacLean	United Kingdom	10.282	Q, WR
2	Anthony Kappes; Barney Storey	United Kingdom	10.351	Q
3	José Enrique Porto Lareo; José Antonio Villanueva Trinidad	Spain	10.504	Q
4	Rinne Oost; Patrick Bos	Netherlands	10.729	Q
5	Tatsuyuki Oshiro; Yasufumi Ito	Japan	10.828	Q
6	Clark Rachfal; David Swanson	United States	10.878	Q
7	Michael Delaney; Con Collis	Ireland	10.944	Q
8	Christos Stefanakis; Konstantinos Troulinos	Greece	10.969	Q
9	Kieran Modra; Scott McPhee	Australia	11.117	
10	William Stanley; Doug Baron	Canada	11.134	
11	Richard Bonhof; Jeroen Lute	Netherlands	11.229	
12	Daniel Chalifour; Alexandre Cloutier	Canada	11.265	
13	Ales Moravec; Pavel Buráň	Czech Republic	11.272	
14	Yannick Reich; Torsten Goliasch	Germany	11.392	
15	Przemyslaw Wegner; Arkadiusz Garczarek	Poland	11.494	
16	Elicer Orjuela Prada; Manuel Javier Tunjano	Colombia	11.627	
17	Laurent Delez; Christophe Grenard	Switzerland	11.628	
18	Brian Cowie; Luc Dionne	Canada	11.644	
19	Ralf Arnold; Jan Ratzke	Germany	11.781	
20	Marek Moflar; Jiri Chyba	Czech Republic	11.915	
21	Alberto Lujan Nattkemper; Juan Martin Ferrari	Argentina	11.996	
22	Nikolaos Manatakis; Nikolaos Koumpenakis	Greece	12.705	
	Emanuele Bersini; Daniele Riccardo	Italy	DNS	
	Ivano Pizzi; Luca Pizzi	Italy	DNS	

=== Quarterfinals ===
Heat	Rank	Name	Nation	Race 1	Race 2	Decider	Notes
1	1	Neil Fachie; Craig MacLean	United Kingdom	11.848	10.746		Q
1	2	Christos Stefanakis; Konstantinos Troulinos	Greece				
2	1	Anthony Kappes; Barney Storey	United Kingdom	10.722	10.860		Q
2	2	Michael Delaney; Con Collis	Ireland				
3	1	José Enrique Porto Lareo; José Antonio Villanueva Trinidad	Spain	11.417	11.339		Q
3	2	Clark Rachfal; David Swanson	United States				
4	1	Rinne Oost; Patrick Bos	Netherlands	11.003	11.435		Q
4	2	Tatsuyuki Oshiro; Yasufumi Ito	Japan				

=== Race for 5th-8th Places ===
Rank	Name	Nation	Time
5	Clark Rachfal, David Swanson	United States	11.895
6	Tatsuyuki Oshiro, Yasufumi Ito	Japan	
7	Michael Delaney, Con Collis	Ireland	10.698
8	Christos Stefanakis, Konstantinos Troulinos	Greece	

=== Semifinals ===
Heat	Rank	Name	Nation	Race 1	Race 2	Decider	Notes
1	1	Neil Fachie, Craig MacLean	United Kingdom	10.979	10.881		Q
1	2	Rinne Oost, Patrick Bos	Netherlands				
2	1	Anthony Kappes, Barney Storey	United Kingdom	11.149	10.820		Q
2	2	José Enrique Porto Lareo, José Antonio Villanueva Trinidad	Spain	REL			

=== Finals ===
Rank	Name	Nation	Race 1	Race 2	Decider
Gold Medal Races
1st place, gold medalist(s)	Neil Fachie, Craig MacLean	United Kingdom		10.892	10.875
2nd place, silver medalist(s)	Anthony Kappes, Barney Storey	United Kingdom	10.821		
Bronze Medal Races
3rd place, bronze medalist(s)	Rinne Oost, Patrick Bos	Netherlands	11.362	11.046	
4	José Enrique Porto Lareo, José Antonio Villanueva Trinidad	Spain			

== See also ==
- 2011 UCI Track Cycling World Championships – Men's sprint
