= Cycling at the 2008 Summer Paralympics – Men's individual pursuit (LC 2) =

Men's Individual Pursuit LC2 at the XIII Paralympic Games
- Paralympic Cycling (track)
- Venue: Laoshan Velodrome
- Dates: 8 September 2008
- Competitors: 10 from 9 nations

Medalists
1st place, gold medalist(s)		Jiří Ježek	Czech Republic
2nd place, silver medalist(s)		Roberto Alcaide	Spain
3rd place, bronze medalist(s)		Jan Boyen	Belgium

The Men's individual pursuit LC2 track cycling event at the 2008 Summer Paralympics was contested on 8 September. It was won by Jirí Ježek, representing Czech Republic.

== Qualifying ==
Qualified for gold medal race
Qualified for bronze medal race

8 Sept. 2008, 10:30

Rank	Athlete	Time	Notes
1	Jiří Ježek (CZE)	4:45.28	PR
2	Roberto Alcaide (ESP)	4:51.48	
3	Jan Boyen (BEL)	4:56.26	
4	Carol Eduard Novak (ROU)	4:57.81	
5	Eric Bourgault (CAN)	5:09.49	
6	Zheng Yuanchao (CHN)	5:13.42	
7	Luis Chacon (COL)	5:15.15	
8	Morten Jahr (NOR)	5:23.92	
9	Amador Granado (ESP)	5:49.53	
10	David Kuster (SLO)	5:50.39	

== Final round ==
8 Sept. 2008, 15:50

Gold

Rank	Athlete	Time	Notes
1st place, gold medalist(s)	Jiří Ježek (CZE)	4:47.00	
2nd place, silver medalist(s)	Roberto Alcaide (ESP)	4:50.32	

Bronze

Rank	Athlete	Time	Notes
3rd place, bronze medalist(s)	Jan Boyen (BEL)	4:56.63	
4	Carol Eduard Novak (ROU)	4:59.08	
