= Cycling at the 2008 Summer Paralympics – Men's individual pursuit (CP 3) =

Men's individual pursuit (CP 3) at the XIII Paralympic Games
- Venue: Laoshan Velodrome
- Dates: 7 September
- Competitors: 8 from 7 nations
- Winning time: Rider caught

Medalists
1st place, gold medalist(s)		Darren Kenny	Great Britain
2nd place, silver medalist(s)		Yong-Sik Jin	South Korea
3rd place, bronze medalist(s)		Jean Quevillon	Canada

The Men's individual pursuit (CP 3) at the 2008 Summer Paralympics took place on 7 August at the Laoshan Velodrome. The pre-event favorite to win the gold medal was reigning champion, Darren Kenny of Great Britain.

== Preliminaries ==
Favourite, Kenny, managed to set a new world record in the preliminary round. The new record was 5.812 seconds faster than the previous record, which was set by Kenny in Alkmar in 2005. Javier Ochoa was disqualified for riding too close to his opponent in the preliminary round, after he had been overtaken by Kenny. Kenny stated that he was disappointed by this as he would have liked to compete against Ochoa in the final.

Q = Qualifier PR = Paralympic Record WR = World Record

Rank	Name	Time
1	Darren Kenny (GBR)	3:36.875 Q WR
2	Yong-Sik Jin (KOR)	3:58.817 Q
3	Jean Quevillon (CAN)	4:03.730 Q
4	Maurice Eckhard (FRA)	4:09.119 Q
5	Tomas Kvasnicka (CZE)	4:11.715
6	Rodrigo Lopez (ARG)	4:13.850
7	Brayden McDougall (CAN)	4:15.006
	Javier Ochoa (ESP)	Disqualified

== Finals ==
Kenny went on to catch his opponent, Yong-Sik Jin of South Korea, in the final round.

Gold medal match

Name	Time	Rank
Darren Kenny (GBR)	caught opponent	1
Yong-Sik Jin (KOR)	caught	1

Bronze medal match

Name	Time	Rank
Jean Quevillon (CAN)	4:03:277	1
Maurice Eckhard (FRA)	4:08.430	4
