= Cycling at the 2008 Summer Paralympics – Men's sprint =

Men's sprint at the XIII Paralympic Games
- Venue: Laoshan Velodrome
- Dates: September 10
- Competitors: 8 from 8 nations

Medalists
1st place, gold medalist(s)		Anthony Kappes & Barney Storey	Great Britain
2nd place, silver medalist(s)		Ben Demery & Shaun Hopkins	Australia
3rd place, bronze medalist(s)		Gavin Kilpatrick & Michael Thomson	South Africa

The Men's sprint event at the 2008 Summer Paralympics took place on September 10 at the Laoshan Velodrome. The event was competed by blind & visually impaired athletes.

Qualification times were set in a 200m flying start (6.5 laps). Races were 6 laps.

== Qualification ==
PR = Paralympic Record

Rank	Name	Time	Speed km/h
1	Anthony Kappes (GBR); Pilot: Barney Storey (GBR)	10.536	68.337 PR
2	Ben Demery (AUS); Pilot: Shaun Hopkins (AUS)	10.629	67.739
3	Gavin Kilpatrick (RSA); Pilot: Michael Thomson (RSA)	10.641	67.662
4	Tatsuyuki Oshiro (JPN); Pilot: Hitoshi Takahashi (JPN)	10.842	66.408
5	Brian Cowie (CAN); Pilot: Devon Smibert (CAN)	11.373	63.307
6	Michael Delaney (IRL); Pilot: David Patrick Peelo (IRL)	11.460	62.827
7	Carlos Arciniegas (COL); Pilot: Juan Carreno (COL)	11.502	62.597
8	Lujan Nattkemper (ARG); Pilot: Juan Ferrari (ARG)	12.163	59.195

As there were only 8 entrants, all qualified for the semi-finals. The qualification was necessary to set up the pairings (1st vs 8th, 2nd vs 7th, etc.), which in turn affected participation in the 5th-6th or 7th-8th race-offs.

== Quarter-finals ==
Match 1

Rank	Name	1st Ride	2nd Ride
1	Anthony Kappes (GBR); Pilot: Barney Storey (GBR)	12.007	11.661
2	Lujan Nattkemper (ARG); Pilot: Juan Ferrari (ARG)		

Match 2

Rank	Name	1st Ride	2nd Ride
1	Ben Demery (AUS); Pilot: Shaun Hopkins (AUS)	11.053	11.405
2	Carlos Arciniegas (COL); Pilot: Juan Carreno (COL)		

Match 3

Rank	Name	1st Ride	2nd Ride
1	Gavin Kilpatrick (RSA); Pilot: Michael Thomson (RSA)	11.259	11.728
2	Michael Delaney (IRL); Pilot: David Patrick Peelo (IRL)		

Match 4

Rank	Name	1st Ride	2nd Ride
1	Tatsuyuki Oshiro (JPN); Pilot: Hitoshi Takahashi (JPN)	12.168	12.431
2	Brian Cowie (CAN); Pilot: Devon Smibert (CAN)		

The winners of each heat qualified to Semifinals. Losers of 1st and 2nd heats raced off for 7th and 8th places, losers of heats 3 and 4 for 5th and 6th places.

== Semi-finals ==
Match 1

Rank	Name	1st Ride	2nd Ride
1	Anthony Kappes (GBR); Pilot: Barney Storey (GBR)	10.747	11.467
2	Tatsuyuki Oshiro (JPN); Pilot: Hitoshi Takahashi (JPN)		

Match 2

Rank	Name	1st Ride	2nd Ride
1	Ben Demery (AUS); Pilot: Shaun Hopkins (AUS)	11.553	
2	Gavin Kilpatrick (RSA); Pilot: Michael Thomson (RSA)		REL

South Africa were relegated for moving outward with the intention of forcing the opponent to go up.

== Finals ==
Gold Medal Match

Rank	Name	1st Ride	2nd Ride
1	Anthony Kappes (GBR); Pilot: Barney Storey (GBR)	10.758	11.524
2	Ben Demery (AUS); Pilot: Shaun Hopkins (AUS)		

Bronze Medal Match

Rank	Name	1st Ride	2nd Ride	Decider
3	Gavin Kilpatrick (RSA); Pilot: Michael Thomson (RSA)			11.517
4	Tatsuyuki Oshiro (JPN); Pilot: Hitoshi Takahashi (JPN)	12.519	REL	

Japan were relegated in the second run for entering the sprinter's lane when the opponent was already there.

5-8 Place Matches

Rank	Name	Time	Speed km/h
5	Michael Delaney (IRL); Pilot: David Patrick Peelo (IRL)	12.145	59.283
6	Brian Cowie (CAN); Pilot: Devon Smibert (CAN)		

Rank	Name	Time	Speed km/h
7	Carlos Arciniegas (COL); Pilot: Juan Carreno (COL)	11.627	61.924
8	Lujan Nattkemper (ARG); Pilot: Juan Ferrari (ARG)		
