= Cycling at the 2008 Summer Paralympics – Men's team sprint =

Men's Team Sprint LC1-4 CP3/4 at the XIII Paralympic Games
- Paralympic Cycling (track)
- Venue: Laoshan Velodrome
- Dates: 10 September 2008
- Competitors: 7

Medalists
1st place, gold medalist(s)		Mark Bristow; Jody Cundy; Darren Kenny	Great Britain
2nd place, silver medalist(s)		Zheng Yuanchao; Zhang Lu; Zhang Kuidong	China
3rd place, bronze medalist(s)		Jiri Bouska; Jirí Ježek; Tomas Kvasnicka	Czech Republic

The Men's team sprint LC1-4 CP3/4 track cycling event at the 2008 Summer Paralympics was competed on 10 September. It was won by the team representing Great Britain.

== Qualifying ==
10 September 2008, 11:15

Qualified for gold medal race
Qualified for bronze medal race

Rank	Team	Time	Notes
1	Great Britain	49.561	
2	China	51.233	
3	Czech Republic	52.889	
4	Australia	54.585	
5	Germany	54.876	
6	Canada	56.183	
7	Spain	58.584	

== Final round ==
10 September 2008, 16:15

Gold

Rank	Team	Time	Notes
1st place, gold medalist(s)	Great Britain	49.323	
2nd place, silver medalist(s)	China	50.480	

Bronze

Rank	Team	Time	Notes
3rd place, bronze medalist(s)	Czech Republic	52.379	
4	Australia	54.239	

== Team Lists ==
Great Britain; Mark Bristow; Jody Cundy; Darren Kenny	China; Zheng Yuanchao; Zhang Lu; Zhang Kuidong	Czech Republic; Jiri Bouska; Jirí Ježek; Tomas Kvasnicka	Australia; Christopher Scott; Michael Gallagher; Greg Ball
Germany; Mario Hammer; Wolfgang Sacher; Pierre Senska	Canada; Jean Quevillon; Mark Breton; Eric Bourgault	Spain; Roberto Alcaide; Amador Granado; Javier Ochoa	
