= Czech Republic at the 2008 Summer Paralympics =

- IPC code: CZE
- NPC: Czech Paralympic Committee
- Website: www.paralympic.cz

in Beijing
- Competitors: 56 in 8 sports
- Flag bearer: Marketa Sidkova
- Medals Ranked 16th: Gold 6 Silver 3 Bronze 18 Total 27

Summer Paralympics appearances (overview)
- 1996; 2000; 2004; 2008; 2012; 2016; 2020; 2024

Other related appearances
- Czechoslovakia (1972–1992)

Czech Republic sent a delegation to compete at the 2008 Summer Paralympics in Beijing, People's Republic of China.

== Medallists ==
Medal	Name	Sport	Event
Gold	David Drahoninsky	Archery	Men's individual compound W1
Gold	Eva Kacanu	Athletics	Women's shot put F54–56
Gold	Jiří Ježek	Cycling	Men's road time trial LC2
Gold	Jiří Ježek	Cycling	Men's individual pursuit LC2
Gold	Běla Hlaváčková	Swimming	Women's 50m backstroke S5
Gold	Běla Hlaváčková	Swimming	Women's 100m breaststroke SB4
Silver	Jiri Bouska	Cycling	Men's 1 km time trial CP4
Silver	Jiří Ježek	Cycling	Men's 1 km time trial LC2
Silver	Běla Hlaváčková	Swimming	Women's 50m freestyle S5
Bronze	Miroslava Cerna; Lenka Kuncova; Marketa Sidkova	Archery	Women's team recurve
Bronze	Jan Vanek	Athletics	Men's club throw F32/51
Bronze	Martin Zvolánek	Athletics	Men's discus throw F32/51
Bronze	Roman Musil	Athletics	Men's discus throw F33–34/52
Bronze	Rostislav Pohlmann	Athletics	Men's javelin throw F57–58
Bronze	Martin Němec	Athletics	Men's shot put F55–56
Bronze	Jana Fesslova	Athletics	Women's discus throw F54–56
Bronze	Eva Berna	Athletics	Women's shot put F37–38
Bronze	Ladislav Kratina; Radek Prochazka	Boccia	Mixed pairs BC4
Bronze	Tomas Kvasnicka	Cycling	Men's road race LC3-4/CP3
Bronze	Marketa Mackova	Cycling	Mixed time trial CP1–2
Bronze	Tomas Kvasnicka	Cycling	Men's 1 km time trial CP3
Bronze	Jiri Bouska; Jiří Ježek; Tomas Kvasnicka	Cycling	Men's team sprint LC1–4/CP 3/4
Bronze	Jan Povysil	Swimming	Men's 50m freestyle S4
Bronze	Jan Povysil	Swimming	Men's 100m freestyle S4
Bronze	Jan Povysil	Swimming	Men's 200m freestyle S4
Bronze	Běla Hlaváčková	Swimming	Women's 100m freestyle S5

== Sports ==
=== Archery ===
==== Men ====
Athlete	Event	Ranking round		Round of 32	Round of 16	Quarterfinals	Semifinals	Finals	
Athlete	Event	Score	Seed	Opposition score	Opposition score	Opposition score	Opposition score	Opposition score	Rank
Jiri Klich	Men's individual compound open	676	6	—N/a	Tornstrom (SWE); W 106-103	Simonelli (ITA); L 110-111	did not advance		
David Drahoninsky	Men's individual compound W1	665	1	—N/a		Lehner (SUI); W 106-102	Kinnunen (FIN); W 99-97	Cavanagh (GBR); W 108-103	1st place, gold medalist(s)
Zdenek Sebek	Men's individual compound W1	586	11	—N/a	An (KOR); L 100-104	did not advance			

==== Women ====
Athlete	Event	Ranking round		Round of 32	Round of 16	Quarterfinals	Semifinals	Finals	
Athlete	Event	Score	Seed	Opposition score	Opposition score	Opposition score	Opposition score	Opposition score	Rank
Miroslava Cerna	Women's individual recurve W1/W2	476	17	Droste (GER); L 87-89	did not advance				
Lenka Kuncova	Women's individual recurve W1/W2	515	13	Tremblay (CAN); W 84-49	Girismen (TUR); L 85-103	did not advance			
Marketa Sidkova	Women's individual recurve W1/W2	593	3	—N/a	Nakanishi (JPN); L 74-82	did not advance			
Miroslava Cerna; Lenka Kuncova; Marketa Sidkova	Women's team recurve	1584	6	—N/a		Japan (JPN); W 174-167	South Korea (KOR); L 184-199	Poland (POL); W 184-182	3rd place, bronze medalist(s)

=== Athletics ===
==== Men's field ====
Athlete	Class	Event	Final		
Athlete	Class	Event	Result	Points	Rank
Radim Běleš	F32/51	Club throw	25.43	1056	4
Radim Běleš	F32/51	Discus throw	9.92	1010	5
Milan Blaha	F53–54	Shot put	8.88 SB	914	12
Dušan Grézl	F37–38	Shot put	12.09	810	9
Ales Kisy	F53–54	Shot put	8.25 SB	1015	4
Jiri Kohout	F37–38	Long jump	5.22 SB	907	10
Roman Musil	F33–34/52	Discus throw	27.11	1026	3rd place, bronze medalist(s)
Roman Musil	F33–34/52	Javelin throw	25.05	1158	4
Roman Musil	F33–34/52	Shot put	10.37	996	7
Martin Němec	F55–56	Discus throw	37.48	987	4
Martin Němec	F55–56	Shot put	11.55	1020	3rd place, bronze medalist(s)
Rostislav Pohlmann	F57–58	Discus throw	45.48 SB	975	3rd place, bronze medalist(s)
Rostislav Pohlmann	F57–58	Javelin throw	39.85 SB	1027	3rd place, bronze medalist(s)
Frantisek Serbus	F32	Shot put	6.55	-	6
Frantisek Serbus	F32/51	Discus throw	17.05	979	7
Miroslav Šperk	F55–56	Discus throw	36.64	951	5
Josef Stiak	F55–56	Discus throw	36.12 SB	938	7
Josef Stiak	F55–56	Javelin throw	31.88	874	4
Jan Vaněk	F32/51	Club throw	25.59	1063	3rd place, bronze medalist(s)
Jan Vlk	F37–38	Long jump	4.56	792	13
Petr Vratil	F37–38	Javelin throw	44.66 SB	911	8
Martin Zvolánek	F32/51	Club throw	25.07	1041	5
Martin Zvolánek	F32/51	Discus throw	10.78	1098	3rd place, bronze medalist(s)

==== Women's track ====
Athlete	Class	Event	Heats		Final	
Athlete	Class	Event	Result	Rank	Result	Rank
Miroslava Sedlackova	T11	100m	14.00	10	did not advance	
Miroslava Sedlackova	T11	200m	28.47	9	did not advance	
Miroslava Sedlackova	T12–13	800m	2:21.54	5	did not advance	
Miroslava Sedlackova	T13	1500m	—N/a		4:53.78	5
Anezka Vejrazkova	T38	100m	14.87	8 Q	14.81	7
Anezka Vejrazkova	T38	200m	30.57	6 Q	30.61	6

==== Women's field ====
Athlete	Class	Event	Final		
Athlete	Class	Event	Result	Points	Rank
Eva Berná	F37–38	Discus throw	25.60	871	10
Eva Berná	F37–38	Shot put	10.84	1057	3rd place, bronze medalist(s)
Vladimíra Bujárková	F37–38	Discus throw	18.80	640	14
Vladimíra Bujárková	F37–38	Shot put	8.96 SB	874	12
Andrea Farkasova	F35–38	Javelin throw	18.29	676	18
Jana Fesslová	F54–56	Discus throw	24.82	946	3rd place, bronze medalist(s)
Jana Fesslová	F54–56	Javelin throw	17.30	974	9
Eva Kacanu	F54–56	Shot put	6.73 WR	1084	1st place, gold medalist(s)
Martina Kniezková	F32–34/51-53	Discus throw	13.39	902	9
Martina Kniezková	F32–34/51-53	Javelin throw	7.94	883	12
Daniela Vratilova	F37–38	Discus throw	28.13	950	4
Nela Zabloudilova	F37–38	Shot put	8.84	862	13

=== Boccia ===
Athlete	Event	Preliminaries			Quarterfinals	Semifinals	Final	
Athlete	Event	Opponent	Opposition Score	Rank	Opposition Score	Opposition Score	Opposition Score	Rank
Ladislav Kratina	Mixed individual BC4	Lau W Y V (HKG)	L 2-6	4	did not advance			
Ladislav Kratina	Mixed individual BC4	Dueso (ESP)	W 6-2	4	did not advance			
Ladislav Kratina	Mixed individual BC4	Beres (HUN)	L 1-9	4	did not advance			
Radek Prochazka	Mixed individual BC4	Qi C (CHN)	L 0-12	3	did not advance			
Radek Prochazka	Mixed individual BC4	E Santos (BRA)	L 0-8	3	did not advance			
Radek Prochazka	Mixed individual BC4	Desamparados Baixauli (ESP)	W 8-1	3	did not advance			
Ladislav Kratina; Radek Prochazka	Pairs BC4	F Pereira (POR) / Valentim (POR)	L 5-6	1 Q	—N/a	Pinto (BRA) / E Santos (BRA); L 1-4	Dueso (ESP) / Desamparados Baixauli (ESP); W 7-3	3rd place, bronze medalist(s)
Ladislav Kratina; Radek Prochazka	Pairs BC4	Lau W Y V (HKG) / Leung Y W (HKG)	W 4-2	1 Q	—N/a	Pinto (BRA) / E Santos (BRA); L 1-4	Dueso (ESP) / Desamparados Baixauli (ESP); W 7-3	3rd place, bronze medalist(s)
Ladislav Kratina; Radek Prochazka	Pairs BC4	Ni (CHN) / Qi C (CHN)	W 8-1	1 Q	—N/a	Pinto (BRA) / E Santos (BRA); L 1-4	Dueso (ESP) / Desamparados Baixauli (ESP); W 7-3	3rd place, bronze medalist(s)

=== Cycling ===
==== Men's road ====
Athlete	Event	Time	Rank
Jiri Bouska	Men's road race LC1/LC2/CP4	1:46:13	5
Jiri Bouska	Men's road time trial CP4	36:18.49	4
Radovan Civis	Men's road race HC B	1:31:56	8
Radovan Civis	Men's road time trial HC B	23:46.53	11
Jiří Ježek	Men's road race LC1/LC2/CP4	1:46:18	12
Jiří Ježek	Men's road time trial LC2	33:36.70	1st place, gold medalist(s)
Lubos Jirka	Men's road race LC1/LC2/CP4	DNF	
Lubos Jirka	Men's road time trial CP4	37:25.57	6
Tomas Kvasnicka	Men's road race LC3/LC4/CP3	1:38:01	3rd place, bronze medalist(s)
Tomas Kvasnicka	Men's road time trial CP3	42:36.23	6
Marcel Pipek	Men's road race HC B	DNF	
Marcel Pipek	Men's road time trial HC B	24:12.99	12
Josef Winkler	Mixed road race	52:56	7
Josef Winkler	Mixed road time trial	26:35.68	9

==== Men's track ====
Athlete	Event	Qualification		Final	
Athlete	Event	Time	Rank	Opposition Time	Rank
Jiri Bouska	Men's individual pursuit CP4	3:45.269	3 q	Neira (ESP); L 3:48.912	4
Jiri Bouska	Men's time trial CP4	—N/a		1:11.19	2nd place, silver medalist(s)
Jiří Ježek	Men's individual pursuit LC2	4:45.28 PR	1 Q	Alcaide (ESP); W 4:47.00	1st place, gold medalist(s)
Jiří Ježek	Men's time trial LC2	—N/a		1:11.18	2nd place, silver medalist(s)
Lubos Jirka	Men's individual pursuit CP4	3:53.556	6	did not advance	
Lubos Jirka	Men's time trial CP4	—N/a		1:16.01	6
Tomas Kvasnicka	Men's individual pursuit CP3	4:11.715	5	did not advance	
Tomas Kvasnicka	Men's time trial CP3	—N/a		1:17.67	3rd place, bronze medalist(s)
Jiri Bouska; Jiří Ježek; Tomas Kvasnicka	Men's team sprint	52.889	3 q	Australia (AUS); W 52.379	3rd place, bronze medalist(s)

==== Women's road ====
Athlete	Event	Time	Rank
Marketa Mackova	Mixed road race	1:00.13	9
Marketa Mackova	Mixed road time trial	29:10.38	3rd place, bronze medalist(s)

=== Powerlifting ===
==== Men ====
Athlete	Event	Result	Rank
Martin Bihary	82.5kg	155.0	11

=== Shooting ===
==== Men ====
Athlete	Event	Qualification		Final		
Athlete	Event	Score	Rank	Score	Total	Rank
Vladimir Marcan	Mixed 25m pistol SH1	502	26	did not advance		

=== Swimming ===
==== Men ====
Athlete	Class	Event	Heats		Final	
Athlete	Class	Event	Result	Rank	Result	Rank
Filip Coufal	S10	100m backstroke	1:06.84	13	did not advance	
Filip Coufal	S10	100m freestyle	56.91	15	did not advance	
Filip Coufal	S10	400m freestyle	4:33.13	11	did not advance	
Filip Coufal	SM10	200m individual medley	2:21.56	8 Q	2:23.18	8
Arnost Petracek	S4	50m backstroke	50.96	5 Q	50.40	4
Arnost Petracek	S4	50m freestyle	46.75	10	did not advance	
Jan Povýšil	S4	50m backstroke	52.46	7 Q	52.79	7
Jan Povýšil	S4	50m freestyle	39.75	3 Q	39.35	3rd place, bronze medalist(s)
Jan Povýšil	S4	100m freestyle	1:25.72	2 Q	1:26.75	3rd place, bronze medalist(s)
Jan Povýšil	S4	200m freestyle	3:04.58	3 Q	3:06.74	3rd place, bronze medalist(s)
Jan Povýšil	SB3	50m breaststroke	58.02	7 Q	57.27	7
Martin Štěpánek	S13	100m backstroke	1:09.62	9	did not advance	
Martin Štěpánek	S13	100m butterfly	1:06.93	11	did not advance	
Martin Štěpánek	S13	50m freestyle	26.11	12	did not advance	
Martin Štěpánek	S13	100m freestyle	57.67	11	did not advance	
Martin Štěpánek	SM13	200m individual medley	2:28.02	12	did not advance	

==== Women ====
Athlete	Class	Event	Heats		Final	
Athlete	Class	Event	Result	Rank	Result	Rank
Tereza Diepoldova	S9	400m freestyle	5:22.92	13	did not advance	
Běla Hlaváčková	S5	50m backstroke	41.17 PR	1 Q	41.03 PR	1st place, gold medalist(s)
Běla Hlaváčková	S5	50m freestyle	36.90	2 Q	37.12	2nd place, silver medalist(s)
Běla Hlaváčková	S5	100m freestyle	1:22.24	3 Q	1:22.20	3rd place, bronze medalist(s)
Běla Hlaváčková	SB4	100m breaststroke	1:57.53	1 Q	1:55.55	1st place, gold medalist(s)
Katerina Komarkova	SB8	100m breaststroke	1:33.97	11	did not advance	

=== Table tennis ===
==== Men ====
Athlete	Event	Preliminaries				Quarterfinals	Semifinals	Final / BM	
Athlete	Event	Opposition Result	Opposition Result	Opposition Result	Rank	Opposition Result	Opposition Result	Opposition Result	Rank
Michal Stefanu	Men's singles C4-5	Guo X (CHN); L 2–3	Pessoa Freitas (BRA); W 3–1	—N/a	2	did not advance			
Zbynek Lambert	Men's singles C7	Ye C (CHN); L 0-3	Morales (ESP); L 0-3	Karabardak (GBR); L 1-3	4	did not advance			
Jaroslav Cieslar	Men's singles C9-10	Fraczyk (AUT); L 0-3	Powrozniak (POL); L 1-3	—N/a	3	did not advance			
Ivan Karabec	Men's singles C9-10	Berecki (HUN); L 1-3	Agunbiade (NGR); W 3-1	—N/a	3	did not advance			
Jaroslav Cieslar; Ivan Karabec; Zbynek Lambert	Men's team C9-10	—N/a				Ukraine (UKR); W 3-1	Spain (ESP); L 2-3	France (FRA); L 1-3	4

==== Women ====
Athlete	Event	Preliminaries				Round of 16	Quarterfinals	Semifinals	Final / BM	
Athlete	Event	Opposition Result	Opposition Result	Opposition Result	Rank	Opposition Result	Opposition Result	Opposition Result	Opposition Result	Rank
Jaroslava Janeckova	Women's singles C8	Kamkasomphou (FRA); L 0–3	Abrahamsson (SWE); L 1–3	Barbusova (SVK); L 1–3	4	did not advance				
Michala de la Bourdonnaye	Women's singles C10	Fan L (CHN); L 0-3	Karmayeva (RUS); W 3-0	Medhat Maghraby (EGY); W 3-0	2 Q	—N/a		Partyka (POL); L 0-3	Hou C (CHN); L 0-3	4
Jaroslava Janeckova; Michala de la Bourdonnaye	Women's team C6-10	—N/a				Egypt (EGY); W 3-1	Poland (POL); L 0-3	did not advance		

== See also ==
- Czech Republic at the Paralympics
- Czech Republic at the 2008 Summer Olympics
