= Cycling at the 2012 Summer Paralympics – Men's sprint =

Cycling, Men's individual sprint at the XIV Paralympic Games
- Venue: London Velopark
- Dates: September 2
- Competitors: 7 from 6 nations

Medalists
1st place, gold medalist(s)		Anthony Kappes; Craig MacLean	Great Britain
2nd place, silver medalist(s)		Neil Fachie; Barney Storey	Great Britain
3rd place, bronze medalist(s)		Jose Enrique Porto Lareo; José Antonio Villanueva	Spain

The Men's individual sprint track cycling event at the 2012 Summer Paralympics took place on September 2 at London Velopark. The event was contested by blind and visually impaired cyclists riding with sighted pilots.

Times set in the qualification stage were used to position riders in the knock-out bracket, and subsequently to determine which riders competed for 5th and 6th positions (i.e. those in the original top 6 who did not reach the medal matches).

== Qualification ==
Rank	Name	Country	Time
1	Anthony Kappes; Pilot: Craig MacLean	Great Britain	10.050
2	Neil Fachie; Pilot: Barney Storey	Great Britain	10.165
3	Jose Enrique Porto Lareo; Pilot: José Antonio Villanueva	Spain	10.458
4	Rinne Oost; Pilot: Patrick Bos	Netherlands	10.535
5	Tatsuyuki Oshiro; Pilot: Yasufumi Ito	Japan	10.639
6	Christos Stefanakis; Pilot: Konstantinos Troulinos	Greece	11.121
7	Alberto Lujan Nattkemper; Pilot: Jonatan Ithurrart	Argentina	11.744

== Finals ==
Quarterfinals
5	Tatsuyuki Oshiro (JPN); Yasufumi Ito (JPN)	2
4	Rinne Oost (NED); Patrick Bos (NED)	1
3	Jose Enrique Porto Lareo (ESP); José Antonio Villanueva (ESP)	2
6	Christos Stefanakis (GRE); Konstantinos Troulinos (GRE)	0
7	Alberto Lujan Nattkemper (ARG); Jonatan Ithurrart (ARG)	0
2	Neil Fachie (GBR); Barney Storey (GBR)	2

Semifinals
1	Anthony Kappes (GBR); Craig MacLean (GBR)	2
5	Tatsuyuki Oshiro (JPN); Yasufumi Ito (JPN)	0
3	Jose Enrique Porto Lareo (ESP); José Antonio Villanueva (ESP)	0
2	Neil Fachie (GBR); Barney Storey (GBR)	2

Gold Medal Match
1	Anthony Kappes (GBR); Craig MacLean (GBR)	2
2	Neil Fachie (GBR); Barney Storey (GBR)	0
Bronze Medal Match
5	Tatsuyuki Oshiro (JPN); Yasufumi Ito (JPN)	0
3	Jose Enrique Porto Lareo (ESP); José Antonio Villanueva (ESP)	2

=== Quarterfinals ===
Heat 1

Name	1st Ride	2nd Ride	Decider
Tatsuyuki Oshiro / Yasufumi Ito (JPN)	10.935	REL	11.002
Rinne Oost / Patrick Bos (NED)		10.891	

Heat 2

Name	1st Ride	2nd Ride
Jose Enrique Porto Lareo / José Antonio Villanueva (ESP)	11.610	11.961
Christos Stefanakis / Konstantinos Troulinos (GRE)		

Heat 3

Name	1st Ride	2nd Ride
Neil Fachie / Barney Storey (GBR)	11.659	12.064
Alberto Lujan Nattkemper / Jonatan Ithurrart (ARG)		

=== Semifinals ===
Heat 1

Name	1st Ride	2nd Ride
Anthony Kappes / Craig MacLean (GBR)	10.817	11.344
Tatsuyuki Oshiro / Yasufumi Ito (JPN)		

Heat 2

Name	1st Ride	2nd Ride
Neil Fachie / Barney Storey (GBR)	11.990	11.332
Jose Enrique Porto Lareo / José Antonio Villanueva (ESP)		

=== Finals ===
Gold medal match

Name	1st Ride	2nd Ride	Rank
Anthony Kappes / Craig MacLean (GBR)	10.473	10.714	1st place, gold medalist(s)
Neil Fachie / Barney Storey (GBR)			2nd place, silver medalist(s)

Bronze medal match

Name	1st Ride	2nd Ride	Rank
Jose Enrique Porto Lareo / José Antonio Villanueva (ESP)	10.822	10.755	3rd place, bronze medalist(s)
Tatsuyuki Oshiro / Yasufumi Ito (JPN)	REL		4

5th—6th place classification

Name	Time	Rank
Rinne Oost / Patrick Bos (NED)	12.581	5
Christos Stefanakis / Konstantinos Troulinos (GRE)		6
