= Cycling at the 2008 Summer Paralympics – Mixed road race =

The Mixed individual road race CP1-2 event at the 2008 Summer Paralympics took place on September 13 at the Changping Triathlon Venue. The race distance was 24.2 km.

Gold	Silver	Bronze
David Stone; Great Britain	Riaan Nel; South Africa	Giorgio Farroni; Italy

Rank	Name	Time	Time behind	Avg. speed
1	David Stone (GBR)	0:45:05	-	32.203
2	Riaan Nel (RSA)	0:48:32	+3:27	
3	Giorgio Farroni (ITA)	0:48:34	+3:29	
4	Mutsuhiko Ogawa (JPN)	0:49:47	+4:42	
5	Helmut Winterleitner (AUT)	0:49:47	+4:42	
6	Stamatios Kotzias (GRE)	0:50:09	+5:04	
7	Josef Winkler (CZE)	0:52:56	+7:51	
8	Barbara Weise (GER)	0:57:15	+12:10	
9	Marketa Mackova (CZE)	1:00:13	+15:08	
10	Mark Homan (NED)	1:03:27	+18:22	
11	Aitor Oroza (ESP)	1:03:27	+18:22	
