= Cycling at the 2004 Summer Paralympics – Men's individual pursuit (LC 2) =

Men's Individual Pursuit LC2 at the XII Paralympic Games
- Paralympic Cycling (track)
- Venue: Olympic Velodrome
- Dates: 18–19 September 2004
- Competitors: 10 from 8 nations

Medalists
1st place, gold medalist(s)		Roberto Alcaide	Spain
2nd place, silver medalist(s)		Jirí Ježek	Czech Republic
3rd place, bronze medalist(s)		Paul Martin	United States

The Men's individual pursuit LC2 track cycling event at the 2004 Summer Paralympics was competed from 18 to 19 September. It was won by Roberto Alcaide, representing Spain.

== Qualifying ==
Qualified for next round

18 Sept. 2004, 11:20

Rank	Athlete	Time	Notes
1	Roberto Alcaide (ESP)	5:00.82	
2	Jirí Ježek (CZE)	5:06.85	
3	Paul Martin (USA)	5:11.09	
4	Gotty Mueller (GER)	5:14.55	
5	Ron Williams (USA)	5:17.84	
6	Morten Jahr (NOR)	5:31.26	
7	Amador Granado (ESP)	5:36.34	
8	Alfred Kaiblinger (AUT)	5:44.23	
9	David Kuster (SLO)	5:50.27	
	Panagiotis Paterakis (GRE)	DSQ	

== 1st round ==
Qualified for gold final
Qualified for bronze final

Heat 1

19 Sept. 2004, 14:00

Rank	Athlete	Time	Notes
1	Ron Williams (USA)	5:12.09	
2	Gotty Mueller (GER)	5:13.22	

Heat 2

Rank	Athlete	Time	Notes
1	Paul Martin (USA)	5:26.18	
2	Morten Jahr (NOR)	5:23.08	

Heat 3

Rank	Athlete	Time	Notes
1	Jirí Ježek (CZE)	5:01.43	
2	Amador Granado (ESP)	OVL	

Heat 4

Rank	Athlete	Time	Notes
1	Roberto Alcaide (ESP)	4:57.94	
2	Alfred Kaiblinger (AUT)	OVL	

== Final round ==
19 Sept. 2004, 16:20

Gold

Rank	Athlete	Time	Notes
1st place, gold medalist(s)	Roberto Alcaide (ESP)	4:58.59	
2nd place, silver medalist(s)	Jirí Ježek (CZE)	5:01.23	

Bronze

Rank	Athlete	Time	Notes
3rd place, bronze medalist(s)	Paul Martin (USA)		
4	Ron Williams (USA)	OVL	
