= Cycling at the 2008 Summer Paralympics – Mixed road time trial =

The Mixed individual time trial CP 1/CP 2 at the 2008 Summer Paralympics took place on September 12 at the Changping Triathlon Venue.

Gold	Silver	Bronze
David Stone; Great Britain	Barbara Weise; Germany	Marketa Mackova; Czech Republic

Rank	Name	Cat	Time	Factor(%)	Final Time with % Factor
1	David Stone (GBR)	CP2_M	22:14.86	100.000	22:14.86
2	Barbara Weise (GER)	CP2_W	28:52.76	81.277	23:28.33
3	Marketa Mackova (CZE)	CP2_W	29:10.38	81.277	23:42.65
4	Mark Homan (NED)	CP1_M	31:17.43	76.768	24:01.26
5	Riaan Nel (RSA)	CP2_M	24:23.26	100.000	24:23.26
6	Giorgio Farroni (ITA)	CP2_M	24:26.57	100.000	24:26.57
7	Aitor Oroza (ESP)	CP1_M	31:58.01	76.768	24:32.41
8	Mutsuhiko Ogawa (JPN)	CP2_M	25:35.80	100.000	25:35.80
9	Josef Winkler (CZE)	CP2_M	26:35.68	100.000	26:35.68
10	Stamatios Kotzias (GRE)	CP2_M	27:02.61	100.000	27:02.61
11	Helmut Winterleitner (AUT)	CP2_M	28:34.12	100.000	28:34.12
