= Cycling at the 2012 Summer Paralympics – men's 1 km time trial B =

Cycling, men's 1 km time trial B at the XIV Paralympic Games
- Venue: ExCeL Exhibition Centre
- Dates: 1 September 2012
- Competitors: 12 from 10 nations
- Winning time: 1:01.351

Medalists
1st place, gold medalist(s)		Neil Fachie; Barney Storey	Great Britain
2nd place, silver medalist(s)		Jose Enrique Porto Lareo; Jose Antonio Villanueva Trinidad	Spain
3rd place, bronze medalist(s)		Rinne Oost; Patrick Bos	Netherlands

The men's 1 km time trial, Class B track cycling event at the 2012 Summer Paralympics took place on 1 September at London Velopark. This class is for blind and visually impaired cyclists riding with a sighted pilot.

== Results ==
WR = world record; DNF = did not finish.

Rank	Name	Country	Time
1st place, gold medalist(s)	Neil Fachie; Pilot: Barney Storey	Great Britain	1:01.351 WR
2nd place, silver medalist(s)	Jose Enrique Porto Lareo; Pilot: Jose Antonio Villanueva Trinidad	Spain	1:02.707
3rd place, bronze medalist(s)	Rinne Oost; Pilot: Patrick Bos	Netherlands	1:03.052
4	Kieran Modra; Pilot: Scott McPhee	Australia	1:03.120
5	Bryce Lindores; Pilot: Sean Finning	Australia	1:03.896
6	Tatsuyuki Oshiro; Pilot: Yasufumi Ito	Japan	1:04.266
7	Clark Rachfal; Pilot: David Swanson	United States	1:05.280
8	Daniel Chalifour; Pilot: Alexandre Cloutier	Canada	1:05.433
9	James Brown; Pilot: Damien Shaw	Ireland	1:07.979
10	Christos Stefanakis; Pilot: Konstantinos Troulinos	Greece	1:09.163
11	Alberto Lujan Nattkemper; Pilot: Jonatan Ithurrart	Argentina	1:11.181
12	Anthony Kappes; Pilot: Craig MacLean	Great Britain	DNF
