= Jan Boyen =

Belgian wheelchair athlete

Personal information
- Nationality: Belgian
- Born: 22 April 1970 (age 56)

Sport
- Sport: Para-cycling
Medal record
Representing Belgium
Men's para-cycling
Paralympic Games
Bronze medal – third place	2008 Beijing	Individual pursuit (LC2)
World championships
Gold medal – first place	2007 Bordeaux	Individual Pursuit (LC2)
Gold medal – first place	2007 Bordeaux	Road time trial (LC2)

Jan Boyen (born 22 April 1970) is a former Paralympian sportsman from Belgium. He competed in powerlifting, motorcycle sport, para-cycling and equestrianism.

== Personal history ==
Boyen was born in Belgium in 1970. A farmer's son, having performed his military service as a paratrooper, he became a professional soldier. It was on his way to the army barracks on his motorcycle that he was hit by a car and that his left leg had to be amputated. In 2006 he suffered more serious injury when he was kicked by a horse and lost a kidney, ruptured his spleen and liver, and suffered from a collapsed lung.

== Sporting career ==
During his rehabilitation after his motorcycle crash, Boyen spent a lot of time in the gym, so much so, that he became a four times champion powerlifting in Belgium.

Switching to cycling, he became UCI world champion in 2007 on the track in the Individual Pursuit LC2 and on the road in the road time trial LC2.

In 2007, although an amputee, he became a professional cyclist in the able-bodied peloton with the Jartazi - Promo Fashion Continental Cycling Team team. In 2008 while still on the team, he took part in the 2008 Summer Paralympics in Beijing, China. He competed in the LC1–2/CP 4 men's road race and the LC2 road time trial ending just outside the medal positions in both races. On the track, he competed in the LC2 1 km time trial finishing 7th and the Individual pursuit where he finished 3rd and won the only medal of his Paralympic career and the only Paralympic medal for Belgium in Beijing. He was the flag bearer for Belgium at the closing ceremony of the Olympics. And he was awarded the 2008 Trophy Victor Boin in Belgium. Boyen however was himself disappointed with his results in Beijing and gave up cycling. Beijing turned out to be his last cycling competition, with hindsight an all too rash decision he regrets to this day.

As Boyen had for years owned and traded horses, he now turned his attention to show jumping and quickly amassed a quite remarkable record as one-legged equestrian. In 2023 he stood 19 times on an international podium, 13 of which as a winner.

== Awards ==
- Trophy Victor Boin
