= Alexander Polishuk =

Azerbaijani taekwondo practitioner

Polishuk Alexander Valeryevich
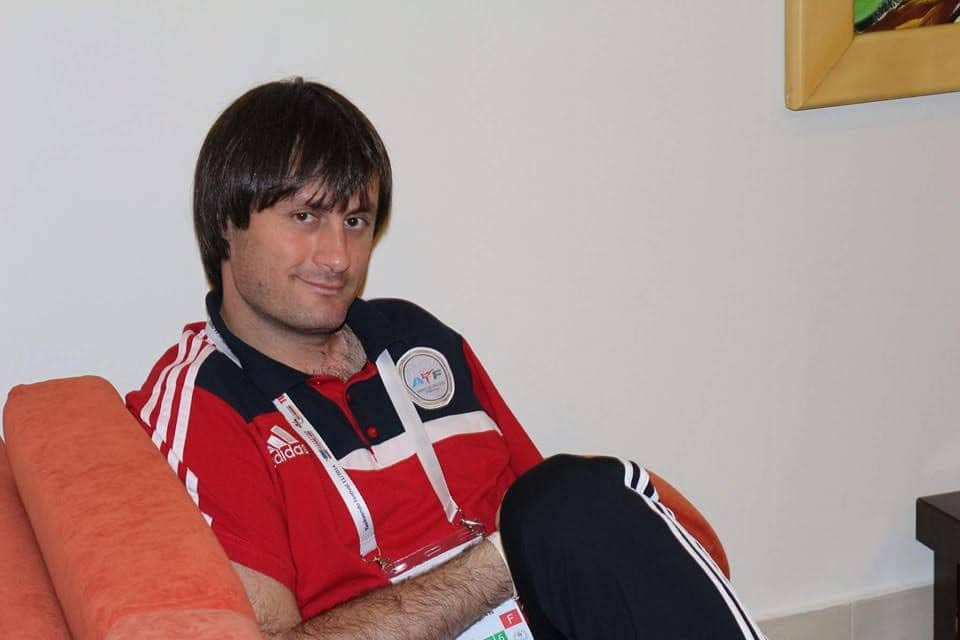

Personal information
- Full name: Polishuk Alexander Valeryevich
- Nationality: Azerbaijani
- Born: 26 December 1978 (age 47) Baku, Azerbaijan
- Education: Kemerovo State University September 2015 - present
Medal record
Representing Azerbaijan
Athletics
Paralympic Games
Gold medal – first place	2003 Assen	400 metres, running
Bronze medal – third place	2003 Assen	200 metres, running
Gold medal – first place	2005 Espoo	Running
Bronze medal – third place	2007 Chinese Taipei	Running
Bronze medal – third place	2007 Stockholm	Running
Men's taekwondo
Gold medal – first place	2011 European Championship	Taekwondo
Gold medal – first place	2013 Lyon	Taekwondo
Gold medal – first place	2013 La Molina	Giant slalom, visually impaired

Polishuk Alexander Valeryevich (born 26 December 1978) is a professional paralympic athlete.
