= Athletics at the 2008 Summer Paralympics – Men's club throw F32/51 =

The Men's Club Throw F32/51 had its Final held on September 15 at 17:05.

== Medalists ==
Gold	Mourad Idoudi; Tunisia
Silver	Stephen Miller; Great Britain
Bronze	Jan Vanek; Czech Republic

== Results ==
Place	Athlete	Class	1	2	3	4	5	6	Best	Points
1	Mourad Idoudi (TUN)	F32	31.16	35.77	35.12	-	-	-	35.77 WR	1125
2	Stephen Miller (GBR)	F32	32.56	31.03	32.73	33.12	31.43	34.37	34.37	1081
3	Jan Vanek (CZE)	F51	25.21	24.59	25.38	24.27	25.29	25.59	25.59	1063
4	Radim Beles (CZE)	F51	24.17	24.64	23.81	25.40	25.43	24.66	25.43	1056
5	Martin Zvolanek (CZE)	F51	21.95	22.48	22.92	24.67	25.07	24.52	25.07	1041
6	Karim Betina (ALG)	F32	30.60	31.36	x	30.05	29.77	30.48	31.36	987
7	Kieron Murphy (GBR)	F32	27.30	27.06	29.03	27.08	26.80	26.35	29.03	913
8	Miroslav Matic (CRO)	F51	19.74	20.56	21.46	20.96	20.18	x	21.46	891
9	Joze Flere (SLO)	F51	21.37	x	x				21.37	888
10	Richard Schabel (GBR)	F51	x	x	21.06				21.06	875
11	John McCarthy (IRL)	F51	17.77	19.53	x				19.53	811
12	Se-Ho Park (KOR)	F32	x	21.76	x				21.76	685
