= Athletics at the 2008 Summer Paralympics – Women's discus throw F37–38 =

Women's Discus F37/38 at the XIII Paralympic Games
- Venue: Beijing National Stadium
- Dates: 14 September
- Competitors: 14 from 10 nations
- Winning distance: 33.67

Medalists
1st place, gold medalist(s)		Mi Na	China
2nd place, silver medalist(s)		Amanda Fraser	Australia
3rd place, bronze medalist(s)		Li Chunhua	China

The women's discus F37/38 event at the 2008 Summer Paralympics took place at the Beijing National Stadium at 09:55 on 14 September. There was a single round of competition; after the first three throws, only the top eight had 3 further throws. The competition was won by Mi Na, representing China.

Britain's Rebecca Chin, initially placed second in the event, was deprived of the silver medal in a dispute over her classification, and her result deleted from the table.

== Results ==
Rank	Athlete	Nationality	Cl.	1	2	3	4	5	6	Best	Pts.	Notes
1st place, gold medalist(s)	Mi Na	China	F37	29.43	31.58	31.53	32.34	32.32	33.67	33.67	1146	WR
2nd place, silver medalist(s)	Amanda Fraser	Australia	F37	29.66	29.53	24.59	29.73	29.55	29.00	29.73	1012	SB
3rd place, bronze medalist(s)	Li Chunhua	China	F37	27.95	26.30	x	27.94	x	26.43	27.95	951	
4	Daniela Vratilova	Czech Republic	F38	24.61	27.06	26.55	26.70	27.69	28.13	28.13	950	PR
5	Jia Qianqian	China	F37	26.38	26.75	26.38	26.19	25.98	27.40	27.40	933	
6	Ingrida Priede	Latvia	F38	26.59	27.64	24.71	25.13	26.30	25.90	27.64	933	
7	Beverley Jones	Great Britain	F37	24.54	x	27.27	27.06	27.02	27.04	27.27	928	SB
8	Aldona Grigaliuniene	Lithuania	F38	26.73	26.67	x	-	-	-	26.73	902	
9	Fatma Kachroudi	Tunisia	F37	25.33	x	26.39	-	-	-	26.39	898	
10	Eva Berna	Czech Republic	F37	25.60	x	24.52	-	-	-	25.60	871	
11	Anna Raszczuk	Poland	F38	21.08	24.40	23.44	-	-	-	24.40	824	SB
12	Viktoriya Yasevych	Ukraine	F37	22.86	21.58	22.24	-	-	-	22.86	778	
13	Shirlene Coelho	Brazil	F37	21.37	20.60	22.25	-	-	-	22.25	757	
14	Vladimira Bujarkova	Czech Republic	F37	x	17.50	18.80	-	-	-	18.80	640	

WR = World Record. PR = Paralympic Record. SB = Seasonal Best.
