= Li Chunhua =

Chinese Paralympic athlete

Medal record

Paralympic athletics

Representing China

Paralympic Games
Gold medal – first place	2004 Athens	Discus Throw - F37
Bronze medal – third place	2008 Beijing	Discus Throw - F37-38

Li Chunhua (Chinese: 李春花) is a Paralympian athlete from China competing mainly in category F37-38 discus throw events.

Li was born in Haimen. At the age of four, she contracted poliomyelitis which resulted in the loss of function in her right arm and leg. Later that year her father died, and when she was six her mother abandoned her in order to remarry. Her uncle then took her in and ensured she attended school until completing primary education. After her primary school graduation, she went to live with her grandmother in Shanghai where educational opportunities were better. She began training for the Paralympics in 2001. She competed in the 2004 Summer Paralympics in the shot put and discus, winning the gold medal in the F37 class discus throw. Four years later she competed in the 2008 Summer Paralympics in Beijing, China. She finished in fourth place in the F37-38 class discus throw, but received the bronze medal after Rebecca Chin of the United Kingdom, who had initially taken second place, was removed from the standings due to protests from the Australian delegation over Chin's classification. She married after the 2008 Paralympics, and then retired from sport to focus on raising her daughter.
