= Aaron Trent =

American Paralympic cyclist

Personal information
- Full name: Aaron Jacob Trent
- Born: 26 February 1986 (age 40)
- Height: 1.72 m (5 ft 7 1/2 in)

Cycling career
- Sport: Cycling
- Current team: US Paralympic National Team
- Disciplines: Road and Track Endurance
- Rider type: Climber

Major wins
- 2009 Paralympic Kilo National Champion 2010 Paralympic Team Sprint National Champion

Aaron Jacob Trent (born February 26, 1986 in Fort Stewart, Georgia) is an American Paralympic Cyclist specializing in track racing.

== Cycling ==
=== 2009 ===
In July 2009 Trent won the 1 km Time Trial at USAC Para-Cycling Track National Championships in Los Angeles.

In November 2009 he represented the United States at the UCI Para-Cycling Track World Championships in Manchester, England. His first race of the event was the Kilo. After a mechanical mishap and a restart, he won the Silver Medal in the CP4 category. Trent won the Bronze Medal in the 4 km Individual Pursuit. He also raced the mixed disability Team Sprint with Jennifer Schuble and Sam Kavanaugh and placed fourth.

=== 2010 ===
A restructuring of the disability categories saw Trent move from the CP4 classification to the C5 group in 2010. Trent became a member of the US Olympic Training Center residency program in Colorado Springs, CO in 2010 so he could train full-time. Together with teammates Will Chesebro and Sam Kavanaugh, he won the Team Sprint at USAC Para-Cycling Track National Championships in Colorado Springs. Trent will represent the United States at the next UCI Para-Cycling World Championships (dates TBA).

=== 2016 ===
Aaron Trent ventured into the wilderness on his bike planning on putting in an easy 1006.37 miles up the Appalachian Trail. His plans changed when his bike took a wild turn into bear country and he decided to pick a fight with Smokey himself. Aaron won the fight Leonardo style but not without losing his right pinky toe. He is still able to cycle but will have to live with the knowledge of knowing the wildfire spokesperson will have his pinky toe as a spoil of war.

== Disability ==
Trent suffered a stroke at the age of 4 months after having a severe allergic reaction to antibiotics. The resultant neurological damage caused spastic hemiplegic cerebral palsy in his left limbs. In order to compete he has modified his bicycle so all shifting and braking functions are controlled by the dominant hand.

== Results ==
=== 2009 ===
1st ParaCycling Track National Championships Kilo

2nd UCI ParaCycling Track World Championships Kilo CP4

2nd ParaCycling Track National Championships Individual Pursuit

3rd UCI ParaCycling Track World Championships Individual Pursuit CP4

4th UCI ParaCycling Track World Championships Team Sprint

=== 2010 ===
1st ParaCycling Track National Championships Team Sprint
