= Jan Vaněk =

Czech Paralympic athlete

Personal information
- Born: 25 January 1979 (age 47) Jičín
Medal record
Paralympic athletics
Representing Czech Republic
Paralympic Games
| Bronze medal – third place | 2008 Beijing | Club Throw - F32/51 |
IPC World Championships
| Bronze medal – third place | 2013 Lyon | Club Throw F31/32/51 |
IPC European Championships
| Gold medal – first place | 2014 Swansea | Club throw - F51 |

Jan Vaněk (born 25 January 1979 in Jičín) is a Paralympian athlete from Czech Republic competing mainly in category F51 club throw events.

He competed in the 2008 Summer Paralympics in Beijing, China. There he won a bronze medal in the men's F32/51 club throw event.
