= Andrzej Zając =

Polish Paralympic cyclist

Personal information
- Full name: Andrzej Zając
- Born: 21 February 1956 (age 70) Lipowa, Poland

Cycling career
- Sport: Cycling
- Discipline: Road
- Role: Rider

Andrzej Zając (born 21 February 1956, in Lipowa) is a Polish Paralympian who shared gold with Dariusz Flak in the Men's Individual Road Race B&VI 1-3 event. This was part of Cycling at the 2008 Summer Paralympics.
