= José Enrique Porto =

Spanish cyclist

Personal information
- Full name: José Enrique Porto Lareo
- Nationality: Spanish
- Born: 21 October 1977 (age 48) Vigo, Spain
Medal record
Men's para-cycling
Representing Spain
Paralympic Games
Silver medal – second place	2012 London	1 km time trial
Bronze medal – third place	2012 London	Sprint
Para-cycling Track World Championships
Bronze medal – third place	2016 Montichiari	Tandem B sprint

José Enrique Porto Lareo (born 21 October 1977) is a Spanish vision-impaired track cyclist and Paralympian.

== Career ==
At the London 2012 Summer Paralympics, Porto teamed with sighted pilot José Antonio Villanueva in the tandem cycling events, where the pair won the silver medal in the Men's 1 km Time Trial and the bronze medal in the Men's Sprint.

At the 2016 UCI Para-cycling Track World Championships, in Montichiari, Italy, Porto won a bronze medal in the Sprint event.

== Awards ==
In 2013, in recognition of his dedication to sport and his achievements at the 2012 Paralympics, Porto was awarded the silver Spanish Royal Order of Sports Merit.
