= José Antonio Villanueva =

Spanish cyclist

Personal information
- Full name: José Antonio Villanueva Trinidad
- Born: 3 February 1979 (age 47) Madrid, Spain
- Height: 1.75 m (5 ft 9 in)
- Weight: 76 kg (168 lb; 12.0 st)

Cycling career
- Sport: Cycling
- Discipline: Track
- Role: Rider
- Rider type: Sprinter
Medal record
Representing Spain
Men's track cycling
World Championships
Silver medal – second place	2002 Ballerup	Keirin
Silver medal – second place	2004 Melbourne	Team sprint
Bronze medal – third place	2000 Manchester	Team sprint
Paralympic Games
Silver medal – second place	2012 London	1 km Time Trial
Bronze medal – third place	2012 London	Sprint

José Antonio Villanueva Trinidad (born 3 February 1979 in Madrid) is a Spanish former track cyclist. Villanueva specialised in the sprint disciplines, where at world championships level he was won a silver medal in keirin and a bronze and a silver medal in team sprint. A few years after his initial retirement from competitive cycling, Villanueva returned as a sighted pilot in tandem track cycling at the 2012 Summer Paralympics, winning a silver and a bronze medal.

== Career ==
=== UCI Track Cycling ===
Date	Placing	Event	Competition	Location	Country
23 May 1999	3	Team sprint (Note: The other riders on the squad were José Antonio Escuredo and Salvador Meliá)	World Cup	Mexico City	Mexico
21 May 2000	1	Team sprint	World Cup	Moscow	Russia
28 May 2000	1	Team sprint	World Cup	Cali	Colombia
16 July 2000	2	Keirin	World Cup	Turin	Italy
28 October 2000	3rd place, bronze medalist(s)	Team sprint	World Championships	Manchester	United Kingdom
25 May 2001	3	Sprint	World Cup	Cali	Colombia
12 August 2001	1	Keirin	World Cup	Mexico City	Mexico
25 September 2002	2nd place, silver medalist(s)	Keirin	World Championships	Ballerup	Denmark
31 May 2002	3	Keirin	World Cup	Moscow	Russia
21 June 2002	1	Team sprint	World Cup	Cali	Colombia
23 June 2002	1	1 km time trial	World Cup	Cali	Colombia
16 February 2003	1	Team sprint	World Cup	Moscow	Russia
July 2003	1	1 km time trial	National championships	Valencia	Spain
July 2003	1	Sprint	National championships	Valencia	Spain
26 May 2004	2nd place, silver medalist(s)	Team sprint	World Championships	Melbourne	Australia
15 February 2004	3	Team sprint	World Cup	Moscow	Russia
14 May 2004	2	Keirin	World Cup	Sydney	Australia
15 May 2004	2	Sprint	World Cup	Sydney	Australia
10 December 2004	3	Keirin	World Cup	Los Angeles	United States
8 January 2005	3	Sprint	World Cup	Manchester	United Kingdom
6 November 2005	3	Team sprint	World Cup	Moscow	Russia
18 February 2006	1	Sprint	National championships		Spain
19 February 2006	3	Keirin	National championships		Spain

=== Paralympics ===
In 2012, having been out of competitive cycling for more than the minimum required 12 months, Villanueva was able to compete as the sighted pilot teamed with vision impaired cyclist José Enrique Porto Lareo in the tandem cycling events the London 2012 Summer Paralympics. The pair won the silver medal in the Men's 1 km Time Trial and the bronze medal in the Men's Sprint.

== Awards ==
In 2013, in recognition of his dedication to sport and his achievements at the 2012 Paralympics, Villanueva was awarded the silver Spanish Royal Order of Sports Merit.
