= LC2 (classification) =

Para-cycling classification

LC2 is a para-cycling classification.

== Definition ==
In 2000, BBC Sport defined this classification as "LC2 - essentially for riders with disabilities in one leg but who are able to pedal normally, " In 2008, BBC Sport defined this classification was "LC2: Riders with impairment in one leg but who can pedal normally" In 2008, the Australian Broadcasting Corporation defined this classification was "Locomotor Disabilities (LC): Cyclists with a physical disability compete in four classes - LC1, LC2, LC3, LC4 - based on functional ability, with separate events for men and women.". The Australian Paralympic Education Program defined this classification in 2012 as: "Riders with impairment in one leg but who can pedal normally"

== Classification history ==
Cycling first became a Paralympic sport at the 1988 Summer Paralympics. In September 2006, governance for para-cycling passed from the International Paralympic Committee's International Cycling Committee to UCI at a meeting in Switzerland. When this happened, the responsibility of classifying the sport also changed.

For the 2016 Summer Paralympics in Rio, the International Paralympic Committee had a zero classification at the Games policy. This policy was put into place in 2014, with the goal of avoiding last minute changes in classes that would negatively impact athlete training preparations. All competitors needed to be internationally classified with their classification status confirmed prior to the Games, with exceptions to this policy being dealt with on a case-by-case basis.

== Events ==
Events for this classification include the 1 km Time Trial.

== Competitors ==
LC3 competitors include Jody Cundy from Great Britain who has won a gold medal at the Paralympics.

== Historical world records ==
Below are some historical world records for this classification in the 200m men's Indoor track / Flying start.

Time	Cyclist	Country	Classification	Date and location	Country location	Reference
14"050	Lubomir Simovec	CZE	LC 2 Bicycle	02.06.1994 GENT	BEL
13"110	Patrick Ceria	FRA	LC 2 Bicycle	03.08.1995 AUGSBURG	GER
11"676	Cundy Jody	GBR	LC 2 Bicycle	06.10.2006 NCC MANCHESTER	GBR
11"458	Cundy Jody	GBR	LC 2 Bicycle	05.10.2007 NCC MANCHESTER	GBR

== Becoming classified ==
Classification is handled by Union Cycliste Internationale.

== See also ==
- Para-cycling classification
- Cycling at the Summer Paralympics
