= Aitor Oroza Flores =

Spanish cyclist

Personal information
- Nationality: Spanish
- Born: 17 July 1976 (age 50)

Sport
- Country: Spain
- Sport: Cycling

Aitor Oroza Flores is a Spanish Paralympic cyclist. He has represented Spain at the Paralympics in 2008 and 2012. His best result in the Paralympics was the seventh place, achieved in 2008. He has competed at several World Championships, winning three gold medals in the individual time trial and one more gold medal in the road race.

== Personal ==
Oroza was born on 17 July 1976 in Bilbao, Biscay, and has cerebral palsy. He lives in the Province of Burgos, Castile and León. In 2012, he lived in Los Altos, Burgos.

== Cycling ==
Oroza is a T1 classified cyclist. He took up the sport when he was 18 years old.

At the 2002 World Championships in Altenstadt, Oroza won two silver medals. At the 2006 World Championships in Switzerland, he won a pair of gold medals. At the 2007 World Championships in Bordeaux, France, he won a gold medal and a silver medal. He competed at the 2008 Summer Paralympics. Competing in two road events, his best finish was seventh, achieved in the individual time trials.

In November 2008, Oroza participated in a Paralympic sports exhibition for schoolchildren in Bilbao. In 2009, he earned a bronze medal and had a fifth-place finish at the UCI World Road Cycling Championships in Bogogno, Italy. Competing at the 2010 UCI Road Cycling World Championships in Baie Comeau, Canada, he finished fourth in the individual time trial and in the road race. At the 2011 UCI Road World Championships in Denmark, he earned a silver and bronze medal. He competed at the 2012 Summer Paralympics. Competing in two events, he had a thirteenth and fifteenth-place finish. He was one of seven Spanish competitors from Castile and León to compete at the Games.

At the 2013 Piacenza Paracycling event, Oroza finished first in the T1 class. In July 2013, Kaletxiki, Andoain held a festival which included an adaptive bicycle race. Competing in his tricycle, he won the event. He competed at the 2013 World Championships in Canada, where became a champion in the individual time trial. He finished fourth in the T1 road race.
