= Jin Yong-sik =

Korean Paralympic cyclist

Personal information
- Nationality: South Korea
Medal record
Cycling
Paralympic Games
| Bronze medal – third place | 2008 Beijing | Time trial (CP 3) |
| Silver medal – second place | 2008 Beijing | Individual Pursuit (CP 3) |

Jin Yong-Sik (Korean: 진용식) is a Korean disabled cyclist. He won two medals at the 2008 Summer Paralympics: a silver medal in the Men's Individual Pursuit and a bronze medal in the Time Trial, when he was a freshman in Korea Nazarene University at age 30. He competed at the London 2012 Paralympic Games in the Men's Individual Pursuit. He also participated in the 2016 Summer Paralympics
