= Rinne Oost =

Dutch Paralympic cyclist

Personal information
- Born: 7 September 1974 (age 51)

Sport
- Country: Netherlands
Medal record
Paralympic Games
Bronze medal – third place	2012 London	1 km time trial B

Rinne Oost (born 7 September 1974) is a visually impaired Dutch Paralympic cyclist. He represented the Netherlands at the 2012 Summer Paralympics held in London, United Kingdom and he won one bronze medal.

Oost won the bronze medal in the men's 1 km time trial B event together with his pilot Patrick Bos.
