= Shaun Hopkins =

Australian cyclist (born 1977)

Personal information
- Nationality: Australia
- Born: 18 April 1977 (age 49)
Medal record
Men's cycling
Representing Australia
Paralympic Games
Silver medal – second place	2008 Beijing	Sprint B VI 1–3
Silver medal – second place	2008 Beijing	1 km Time Trial B VI 1–3

Shaun Hopkins (born 18 April 1977) is an Australian cyclist, who piloted vision impaired tandem cyclist Ben Demery throughout his career. His father and relatives of his mother were competitive cyclists. He began competitive cycling in 1985 and his first national competition was in 1995. He won a silver medal in the sprint and a bronze medal in the 1 km time trial at his first international competition, the 2006 IPC Cycling World Championships. In the next year's UCI Para-cycling Track World Championships, he won silver medals in both the sprint and the 1 km time trial. At the 2008 Beijing Games, he won two silver medals in the Men's Sprint B VI 1–3 and Men's 1 km Time Trial B VI 1–3 events.

He works at a bike shop in the Sydney suburb of Casula.
