= Darren Kenny =

British cyclist (born 1970)

Darren Kenny OBE
Personal information
- Full name: Darren Kenny
- Nickname: Daz the Destroyer
- Born: 17 March 1970 (age 56) Salisbury, England, United Kingdom

Cycling career
- Sport: Cycling
- Disciplines: Track & Road
- Role: Rider

Amateur team
- 2008 - 2009: Dave Mellor Cycles
Medal record
Representing Great Britain
Men's cycling
Paralympic Games
Gold medal – first place	2004 Athens	Individual pursuit (CP 3)
Gold medal – first place	2004 Athens	Kilo (CP 3)
Gold medal – first place	2008 Beijing	Individual pursuit (CP 3)
Gold medal – first place	2008 Beijing	Kilo (CP 3)
Gold medal – first place	2008 Beijing	Team Sprint (LC1–4 CP3/4)
Gold medal – first place	2008 Beijing	Road Race (LC3–4 CP3/4)
Silver medal – second place	2004 Athens	Combined Event; Road Race & Time Trial (CP 3)
Silver medal – second place	2008 Beijing	Time Trial (CP 3)
Silver medal – second place	2012 London	Mixed Team Sprint (C1-5)
Bronze medal – third place	2012 London	Individual pursuit (C 3)

Darren Kenny OBE (born 17 March 1970) is a British road and track racing cyclist and Paralympian. Kenny's results have made him one of his sport's biggest stars; his dominance over multiple Paralympics gave rise to his nickname of 'Daz the Destroyer'.

Darren Kenny OBE retired from competition in 2013. He is now the founder/owner of Estrella

== Career ==
Born in Salisbury, Wiltshire, Kenny now lives in Verwood, Dorset. Having been involved in cycling since he was young, Kenny started racing at the age of eleven. In 1988, at the age of 19, an accident at the Tour of Ireland whilst descending the Wicklow Gap looked likely to have ended his career. He had damaged his neck, but did not realise the extent of the damage at the time. A series of accidents after that, notably tripping over a black cat whilst working as a milkman in Bournemouth, exacerbated his condition, as Kenny put it: "until I was just lying on the sofa putting on weight and on heavy medication."

At the age of 30, Kenny returned to cycling, initially to improve his fitness, but he soon began racing once more. Encouraged by a friend, Kenny contacted British Cycling to find out more about Paralympics racing. He competed at the British National Track Championships, achieving some good times, he was invited onto the Paralympic squad.

In January 2008, Kenny was nominated for "Sportsperson of the Year with a Disability" Laureus World Sports Awards, which recognise sporting achievement during the previous year.

Kenny managed to set a new world record in the preliminary round of the Individual pursuit (CP 3) at the 2008 Paralympics. The new record was 5.812 seconds faster than his own previous world record.

Kenny was appointed Officer of the Order of the British Empire (OBE) in the 2009 New Year Honours for services to disabled sport. Awarded an Honorary Doctorate of Arts by Bournemouth University in 2009 and an Honorary Degree Masters in Science by Brighton University.

Awards include: Variety Club Disabled Sportsman 2004, BBC South Sports Personality of the Year 2005, BBC South West Paralympian of the Year 2008, BBC South Disabled Sports Personality of the Year 2004, Sports Journalist Award for Disabled Sportsman of the Year.

== Results ==
2004
Gold, Kilo, Paralympics, Athens
Gold, Pursuit, Paralympics, Athens
Silver, Combined Road Race and Time Trial, Paralympics, Athens

2005
World Para-Cycling Best Hour Performance (C3): 41.817 km
Gold, 200m, World Disability Championships
Gold, Kilo, World Disability Championships
Gold, Pursuit, World Disability Championships
Gold, Team Sprint, World Disability Championships
Gold, Road Race, World Disability Championships
Silver, Time Trial, World Disability Championships

2006
Gold, Kilo, World Disability Championships
Gold, Pursuit, World Disability Championships
Silver, Time Trial, World Disability Championships
Silver, Road Race, World Disability Championships

2007
Gold, Kilo, World Disability Championships
Gold, Pursuit, World Disability Championships
Bronze, Time Trial, World Disability Championships
Bronze, Road Race

2008
Gold Men's 1km time trial (CP 3), Paralympics, Beijing
Gold Men's team sprint (LC1–4 CP3/4), Paralympics, Beijing (with Mark Bristow and Jody Cundy)
Gold Individual pursuit (CP 3), Paralympics, Beijing
Gold Men's road race (LC 3–4/CP 3), Paralympics, Beijing
Silver Men's road time trial (CP 3), Paralympics, Beijing

2009
World Para-Cycling hour record (C3): 40.516 km
2012
Silver Mixed Team Sprint (C1-5), Paralympics, London
Bronze Individual pursuit (C 3), Paralympics, London
