= Barney Storey =

English racing cyclist (born 1977)

Barney Storey MBE
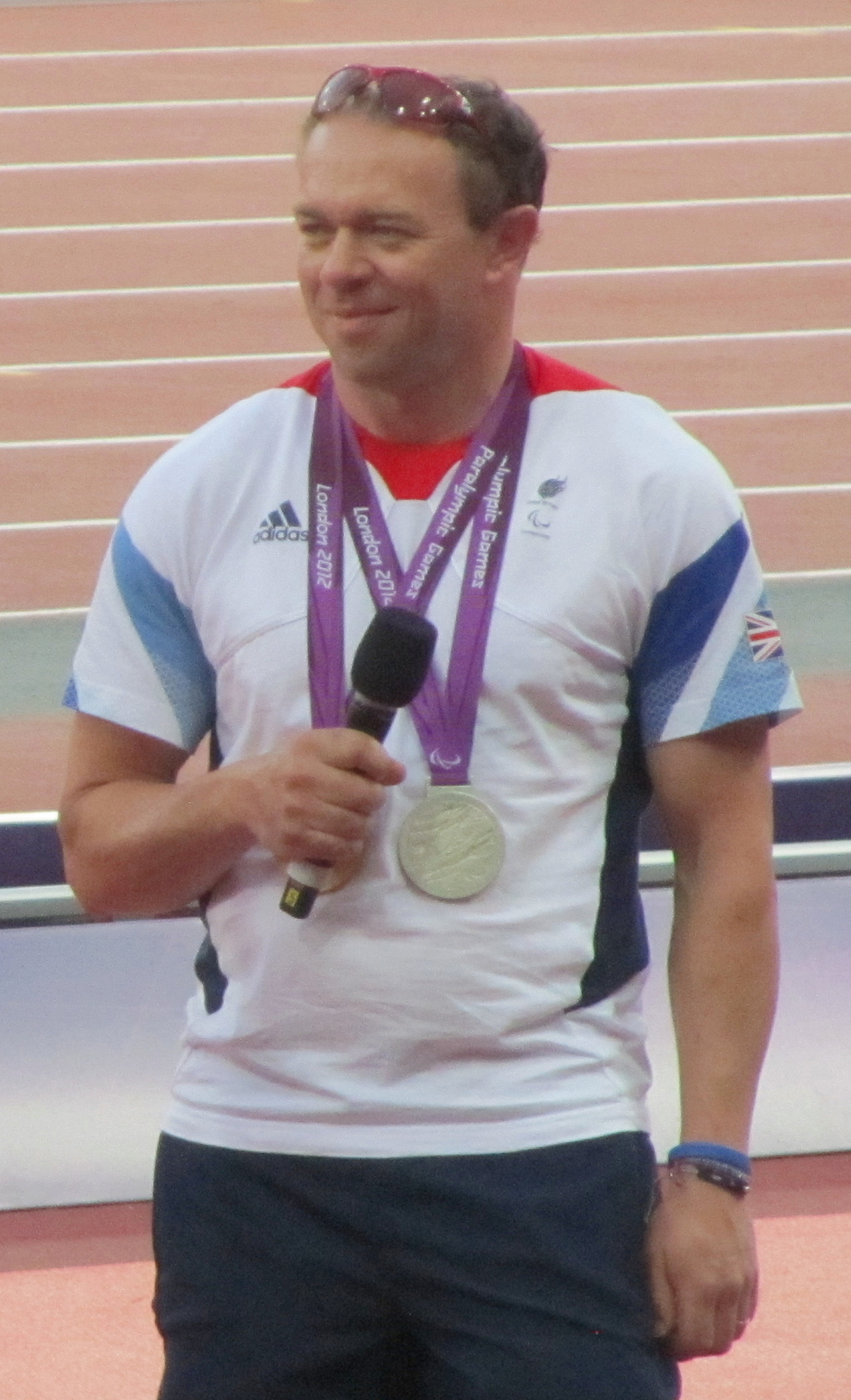
- Storey at the 2012 Paralympics

Personal information
- Born: 13 March 1977 (age 49)

Sport
- Sport: Paralympic track cycling
Medal record
Representing Great Britain
Summer Paralympic Games
Gold medal – first place	2008 Beijing	1 km time trial (B&VI 1–3)
Gold medal – first place	2008 Beijing	Sprint (B&VI 1–3)
Gold medal – first place	2012 London	1 km time trial B
Silver medal – second place	2012 London	Sprint B
World Disability Championships
Gold medal – first place	2006	1 km time trial
Gold medal – first place	2006	sprint
Gold medal – first place	2007	1 km time trial
Gold medal – first place	2007	Sprint

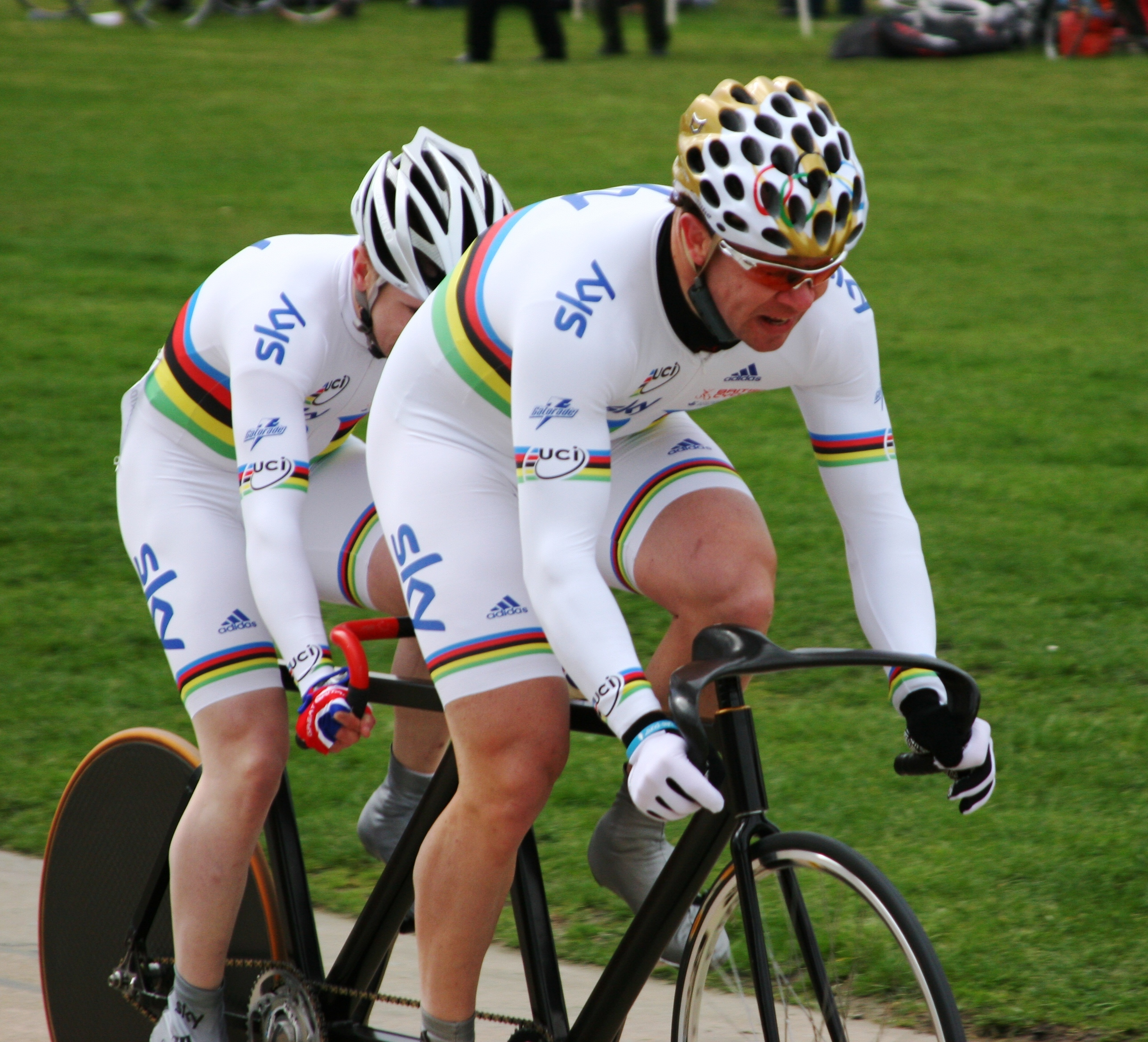
Storey with Neil Fachie at Herne Hill Velodrome in 2010

Richard Barnaby Storey MBE (born 13 March 1977) is a British cyclist. He rides as a sighted pilot for blind or partially sighted athletes in tandem track cycling events. He competed at the 2004, 2008 and 2012 Paralympic Games and won three gold medals and a bronze.

Storey who grew up in Corfe Mullen and attended Corfe Hills School has had Type 1 diabetes since the age of four.

At the 2004 Summer Paralympics he participated in two tandem track cycling events, acting as the sighted pilot for Daniel Adam Gordon. The pair finished fourth in the sprint and fifth in the 1 km time trial. In 2005 he won the British national title for the 200 metres tandem sprint competing with Craig MacLean. At the 2006 British National Tandem Sprint Championships held in Newcastle Storey defended the title partnered by partially sighted Paralympian Anthony Kappes; this made them the first Paralympic team to hold the able-bodied national title. Storey won gold medals in both the sprint and time trial at the 2006 World Disability Championships and defended both titles successfully in 2007.

In 2007, Storey married Paralympian Sarah Bailey. The couple's first daughter was born on 30 June 2013 and their first son on 14 October 2017. They live in Disley, Cheshire.

At the 2008 Paralympics in Beijing, China, Storey competed as the pilot for Kappes in the B&VI 1–3 classification. In the 1 km time trial they set a new world-record time of one minute 2.864 seconds to win the gold medal. Storey and Kappes won their second gold medal of the Games in the B&VI 1–3 sprint. The pair defeated Argentina and Japan en route to the final which they won 2–0 against Australia. The medal came less than an hour after Barney's wife Sarah had won Paralympic gold in the same velodrome competing in the women's individual pursuit.

Following the Beijing Games, Storey was appointed Member of the Order of the British Empire (MBE) in the 2009 New Year Honours "for services to disabled sport".

At the UCI Para-cycling Track World Championships in Manchester in 2009 Storey teamed up with former Paralympic sprinter Neil Fachie. Together they broke the 1 km time trial world record for the B&VI 1 classification which had been set by Storey in partnership with Kappes.

== See also ==
- Great Britain at the 2004 Summer Paralympics
- Great Britain at the 2008 Summer Paralympics
- 2012 Summer Olympics and Paralympics gold post boxes
