= Ben Demery =

Australian Paralympic tandem cyclist (born 1986)

Personal information
- Nationality: Australia
- Born: 19 September 1986 (age 40)
Medal record
Cycling
Paralympic Games
Silver medal – second place	2008 Beijing	Men's Sprint B VI 1–3
Silver medal – second place	2008 Beijing	Men's 1 km Time Trial B VI 1–3
IPC Track and Road World Championships
Silver medal – second place	2006 Aigle	Men's 200 m Time Trial B & VI
Silver medal – second place	2007 Bordeaux	Men's 1 km Time Trial B & VI
Bronze medal – third place	2006 Aigle	Men's 1 km Time Trial B & VI

Ben Demery (born 19 September 1986) is an Australian Paralympic tandem cyclist with a vision impairment. He comes from the New South Wales city of Newcastle. His pilot throughout his career has been Shaun Hopkins. He started competitive cycling in December 2005 and won a silver medal in the sprint and a bronze medal in the 1 km time trial at his first international competition, the 2006 IPC Cycling World Championships; that year he was named Lake Macquarie’s Sports Person of the Year. In the next year's UCI Para-cycling Track World Championships, he won silver medals in both the sprint and the 1 km time trial. At the 2008 Beijing Games, he won two silver medals in the Men's Sprint B VI 1–3 and Men's 1 km Time Trial B VI 1–3 events.
