= Steven George =

Australian Paralympic cyclist

Personal information
- Nationality: Australia
- Born: 5 June 1982 (age 44)
Medal record
Cycling
Paralympic Games
Bronze medal – third place	2008 Beijing	Men's Individual Pursuit B VI 1–3

Steven George (born 5 June 1982) is an Australian Paralympic tandem cycling pilot, who piloted Bryce Lindores at the 2008 Beijing Paralympics. He won a bronze medal at the games in the Men's Individual Pursuit B VI 1–3 event, with the pair beating their personal best time by six seconds.
