= Anthony Kappes =

English cyclist (born 1973)

Anthony Kappes MBE
Personal information
- Full name: Anthony Kappes
- Born: 1 March 1973 (age 53) Stockport, England, United Kingdom

Cycling career
- Sport: Cycling
- Disciplines: Track & Road
- Role: Rider
Medal record
Representing Great Britain
Men's track cycling
Paralympic Games
Gold medal – first place	2008 Beijing	Kilo (B&VI 1–3)
Gold medal – first place	2008 Beijing	Sprint (B&VI 1–3)
Gold medal – first place	2012 London	Sprint (B&VI 1–3)

Anthony Edward Kappes MBE (born 1 March 1973) is an English road and track racing cyclist and Paralympian.

== Biography ==
Born in Stockport, Cheshire, Kappes is partially sighted and competes in the B&VI 1–3 class.

He is the current World record holder for 200 metres, along with his pilot Barney Storey. Storey and Kappes became the first Paralympic team to hold the able-bodied British National Tandem Sprint Championships title in 2006.

Kappes, began working with a new tandem pilot internationally in 2008, Jon Norfolk sacrificed his career as a member of Great Britain's able-bodied squad in order to work with Paralympians, and had to take a three-year break from competition in order to qualify. Kappes and Norfolk beat Simon Jackson and Storey to win the sprint and kilo (Achieving Worlds Best - 1.02.06) events at the 2008 VISA Paralympic World Cup.

Riding with Storey once more at the 2008 Summer Paralympics, Kappes won gold at the Kilo and the Sprint.

Kappes was appointed Member of the Order of the British Empire (MBE) in the 2009 New Year Honours for services to disabled sport.

== Palmarès ==
2006
Gold Sprint, World Disability Championships
Gold Kilo, World Disability Championships

2007
Gold Sprint, World Disability Championships
Gold Kilo, World Disability Championships

2008
Gold Kilo (B&VI 1–3), Paralympics, Beijing (with Barney Storey)
Gold Sprint (B&VI 1–3), Paralympics, Beijing (with Barney Storey)
1st Sprint, VISA Paralympic World Cup (with Jon Norfolk)

2012
Gold Cycling at the 2012 Summer Paralympics - Men's sprint (B), Paralympics, London (with Craig MacLean)

== See also ==
- 2012 Summer Olympics and Paralympics gold post boxes
