= Mark Bristow =

English paralympic cyclist (born 1962)

Mark Bristow MBE
Personal information
- Full name: Mark Bristow
- Born: 8 July 1962 (age 64) England; Great Britain

Cycling career
- Sport: Cycling
- Discipline: Track
- Role: Rider
- Rider type: Sprinter
Medal record
Men's track cycling
Representing Great Britain
Paralympic Games
Gold medal – first place	2008 Beijing	Kilo
Gold medal – first place	2008 Beijing	Team sprint

Mark Bristow MBE (born 8 July 1962) is an English paralympic cyclist. Born in Nazeing near Waltham Abbey, Essex, Bristow currently resides in Sacramento, California. He took up the sport of disability cycling after being injured in a bike crash in San Francisco in September 1997. Bristow's is a computer administrator, and is related to the darts player Eric Bristow.

Bristow was appointed a Member of the Order of the British Empire (MBE) for services to disabled sport in the 2009 New Years Honours.
