= Jean Quevillon =

Canadian Paralympic cyclist

Personal information
- Born: 8 August 1963 (age 62) Sainte-Adèle, Quebec, Canada

Sport
- Country: Canada
- Sport: Cycling
Medal record
Cycling
Representing Canada
Paralympic Games
Silver medal – second place	2000 Sydney	Mixed Road Bicycle Time Trial CP Div 3
Bronze medal – third place	2008 Beijing	Men's Track Individual Pursuit CP3

Jean Quevillon (born 8 August 1963) is a Canadian Paralympic cyclist. He has two Paralympic medals.

== Career ==
Quevillon made his national debut at the 2000 Summer Paralympics, where he earned a silver medal in the Mixed Road Bicycle Time Trial CP Div 3. He would later compete at the Cerebral Palsy Games in 2005, where he would win six medals; one gold, two silver and three bronze.

Quevillon was selected to represent Team Canada at the 2008 Summer Paralympics, where he won a bronze in the men's individual pursuit. He later finished in fifth place in the CP3 men's 24.8 kilometre time trial with a time of 41:42.97.

Quevillon announced his retirement on November 4, 2009.
