= Michael Thomson (cyclist) =

South African cyclist

Personal information
- Born: 18 February 1983 (age 43)

Cycling career
- Sport: Cycling
- Discipline: Track cycling
- Role: Rider
- Rider type: sprinter

Michael Thomson (born 18 February 1983) is a South African male track cyclist, riding for the national team. He competed in the keirin event at the 2010 UCI Track Cycling World Championships.
