= Ming Tombs Reservoir =

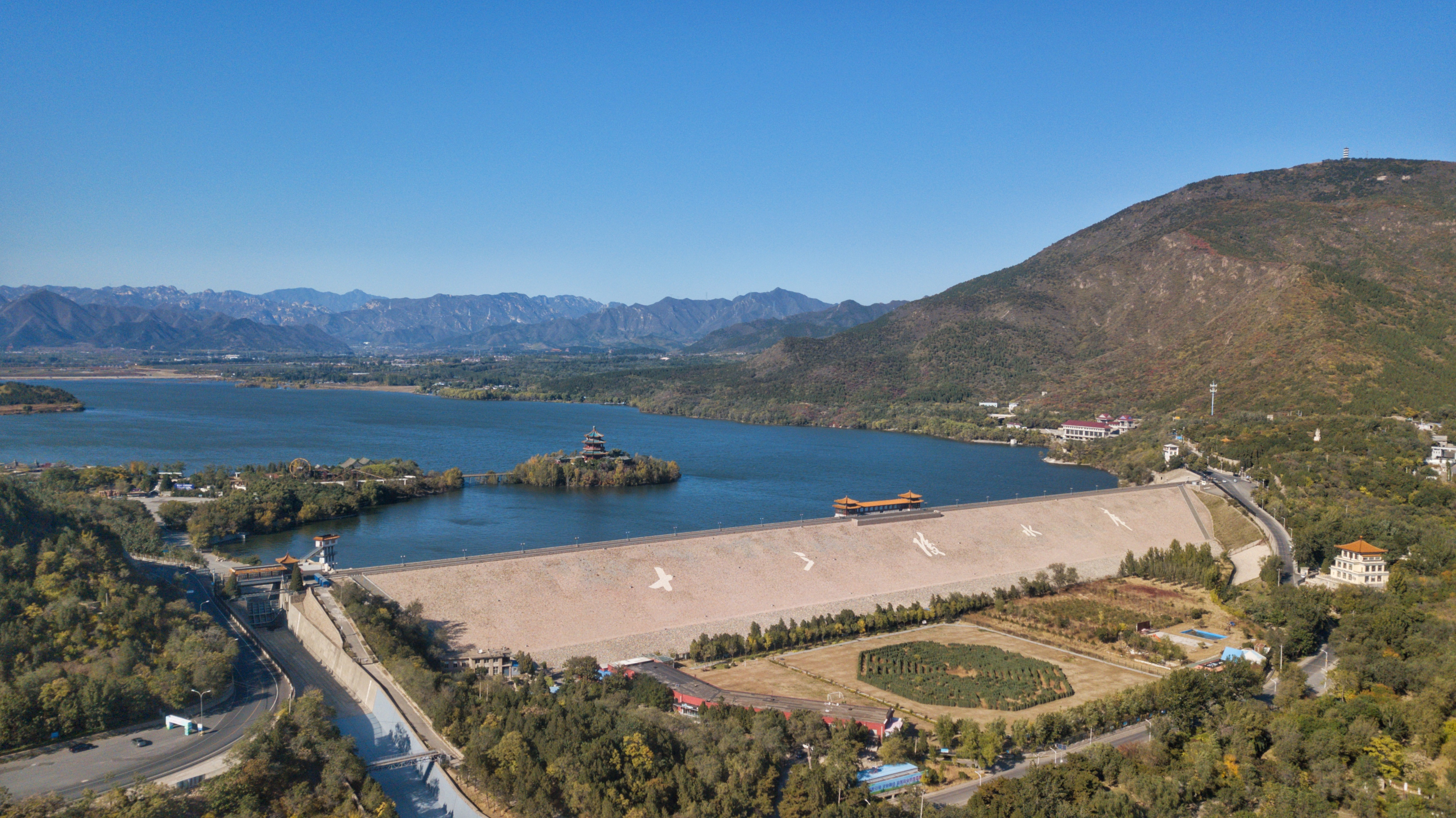
- Ming Tombs Reservoir and the dam
- Interactive map of Ming Tombs Reservoir
- Official name: Ming Tombs Reservoir
- Location: Changping, Beijing, China
- Coordinates: 40°25′03″N 116°26′58″E
- Construction began: 1958-1
- Opening date: 1958-4
- Demolition date: N/A
- Owner: PRC

Dam and spillways
- Height: 29 m (95 ft)
- Length: 627 m (2,057 ft)
- Width (base): 179 m (587 ft)

Reservoir
- Total capacity: 60,000,000 m^{3} (49,000 acre⋅ft)

The Ming Tombs Reservoir or the Shisanling Reservoir (十三陵水库) is a dam in Changping District of northern Beijing, China. Named for the Ming tombs nearby, it is the lower reservoir of the Shisanling Pumped Storage Power Station. The earth-fill embankment dam is 29 metres (95 ft) high and 627 metres (2,057 ft) long. The dam creates a reservoir that can store 59,000,000 cubic metres (2.083565337×10^{9} ft^{3}) of water and contains a controlled chute spillway.

== History ==
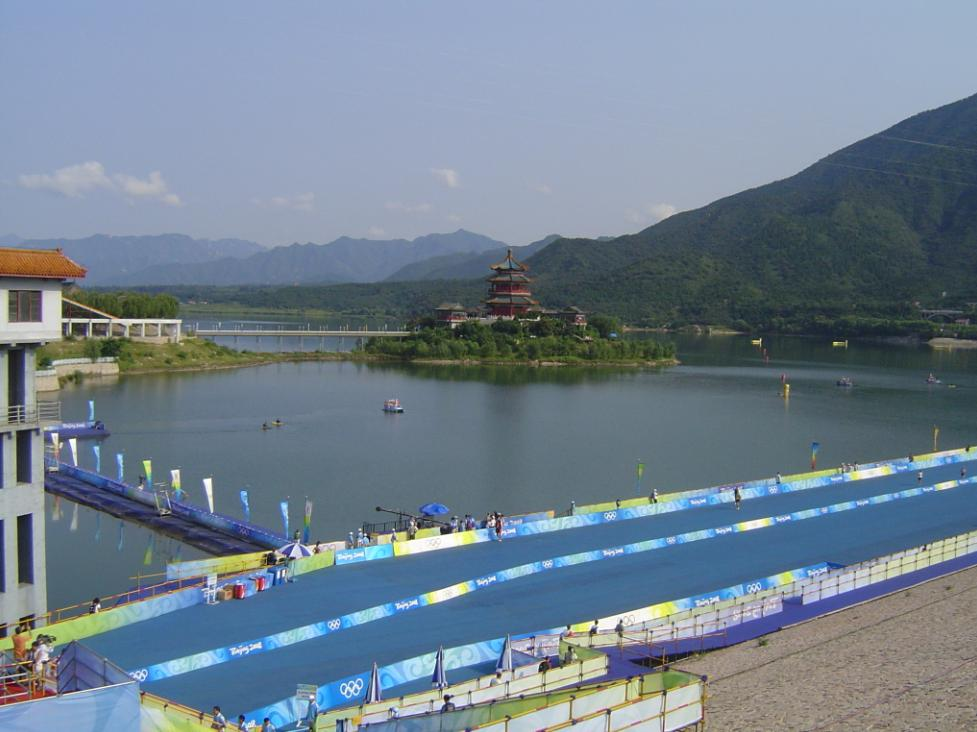
The Triathlon Venue at the Ming Tomb Reservoir

The Ming Tombs Reservoir was built in only four months by hundreds of thousands of workers who labored around the clock.

In 2008, the reservoir was one of the nine temporary venues of the Beijing Olympics. It was used for the Triathlon events at the 2008 Summer Olympics, during which it was known as the Triathlon Venue (simplified Chinese: 铁人三项赛场; traditional Chinese: 鐵人三項賽場; pinyin: Tiěrén Sānxiàng Sàichǎng).

== Cultural relevance ==
During its construction, the project attracted writers and artists from nearby Beijing. The Ming Tombs Reservoir's development was represented in photography, music, literature and film.

French photographer Henri Cartier-Bresson also documented the construction in color photography.
