= Jiří Ježek =

Czech road and track racing cyclist and Paralympian

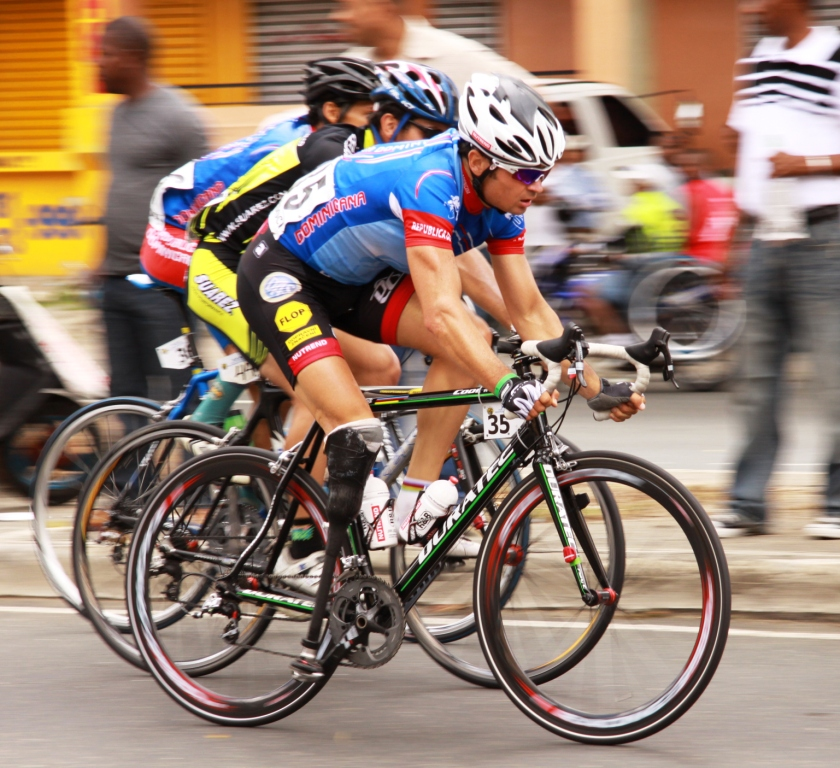
- Ježek in the Dominican Republic, 2009

Personal information
- Born: 16 October 1974 (age 52) Prague
Medal record
Men’s Paralympic Cycling
Representing Czech Republic
Paralympic Games
Gold medal – first place	2000 Sydney	1km
Gold medal – first place	2000 Sydney	4km pursuit
Gold medal – first place	2004 Athens	road race / time trial
Gold medal – first place	2008 Beijing	4km pursuit
Gold medal – first place	2008 Beijing	time trial
Gold medal – first place	2012 London	time trial
Silver medal – second place	2000 Sydney	road race
Silver medal – second place	2004 Athens	4km pursuit
Silver medal – second place	2008 Beijing	1km
Silver medal – second place	2012 London	Individual pursuit
Bronze medal – third place	2008 Beijing	team sprint

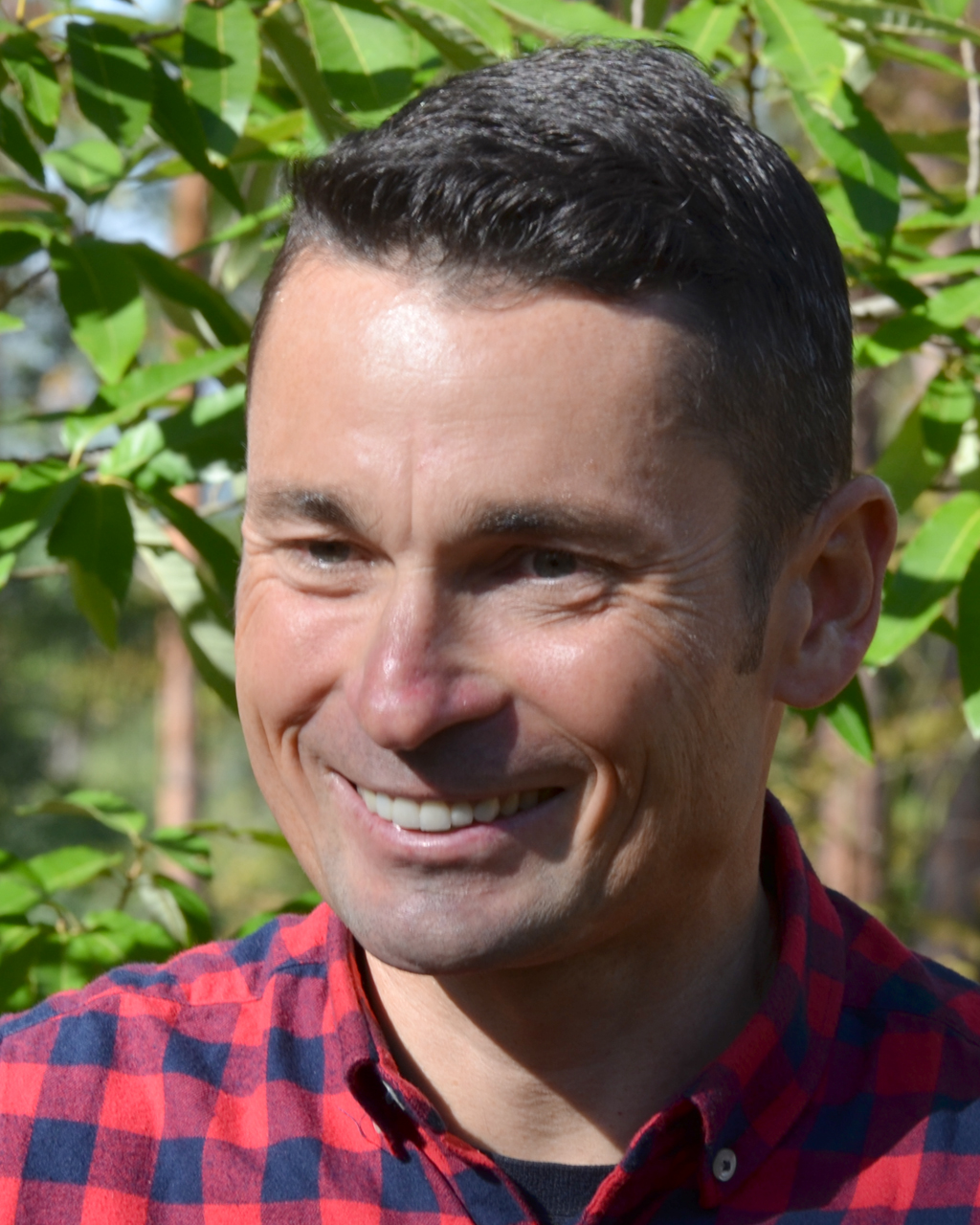
Ježek in 2018

Jiří Ježek (born 16 October 1974 in Prague) is a former Czech road and track racing cyclist and Paralympian who has won medals at each of the past three Paralympic Games.

== Career ==
At the age of 11, Jiří Ježek lost his right leg below the knee in a car accident and by the age of 20 he had taken up competitive cycling as a hobby. After five years of hard training Ježek began to emerge as one of the world's top cyclists riding in the paralympic LC2 (locomotor disabilities) category. As an amateur he competed in his first Paralympic Games in Sydney in 2000 winning two gold medals. After this success he continued to ride as an amateur but started intensifying his training regime, taking it up to a more professional level.

Thanks to the support of sponsors he was able to leave his job as a prosthetics technician and begin his present career as a professional cyclist. In 2004 Ježek won gold in the prestigious Paralympic road race in Athens. Since then he has continued to ride at the very highest level, winning several championship titles and numerous races. At the Paralympic Games in Beijing 2008 whilst serving as captain of the Czech National Paralympic Team, he won gold in both the 4 km pursuit and time trial events.

Spurred on by his Paralympic cycling achievements Ježek began not only to compete with other disabled riders but also with professional able-bodied riders against whom he regularly races in many important events around the world. Altogether Ježek competes in anywhere between 55 and 75 races worldwide each year and, including training, covers an annual distance of between 27 and 30 thousand kilometers. Off the bike he is regularly involved with other work including motivational speaking, supporting charities, organising children's cycle races and advising in the development of prosthetic limbs. In 2008 he wrote an autobiography entitled "Frajer".

Jiří Ježek has stated that he is "not just cycling for the Czech Republic but also for all of those who suffer from a disability of one sort or another". He was appointed as a member of the inaugural UCI Athletes' Commission in 2011.

Ježek suffered serious injuries during the 2014 UCI Para-cycling Road World Championships in Greenville, South Carolina, USA. He injured his chest after a fall, sustaining multiple fractures, but was released from hospital the same month.

On 14 October 2017 Ježek announced his retirement from professional cycling aged 43.

In 2024, he participates in the 13th season of Czech dancing reality TV show StarDance with his professional partner Lenka Nora Návorková.

On 28 October 2026, Ježek was awarded by the Czech Republic's Medal of Merit for services to the state in the field of sport.
