= Tomáš Kvasnička =

Czech paralympic cyclist

Personal information
- Born: 4 February 1990 (age 36)

Sport
- Sport: Paralympic cycling
Medal record
Representing Czech Republic
Paralympic Games
Bronze medal – third place	2008 Beijing	Road race LC3-4/CP3
Bronze medal – third place	2008 Beijing	1km time trial CP3
Bronze medal – third place	2008 Beijing	Team sprint LC1-4 CP3/4

Tomáš Kvasnička (born 4 February 1990) is a Czech former Paralympic cyclist who competed in international road cycling competitions. He is a triple Paralympic bronze medalist and has competed at the 2008 Summer Paralympics.

Tomáš is the son of Miloslav Kvasnička who was a cyclo-cross World medalist.
