= Jiří Bouška =

Personal information
- Born: 30 December 1979 (age 46) Sadská, Czechoslovakia

Sport
- Sport: Paralympic cycling
- Disability: Hemiplegia
- Disability class: CP4
Medal record
Representing Czech Republic
Paralympic Games
Silver medal – second place	2008 Beijing	1km time trial CP3/4
Bronze medal – third place	2004 Athens	1km time trial CP3/4
Bronze medal – third place	2004 Athens	Road time trial C4
Bronze medal – third place	2008 Beijing	Team sprint LC1-4 CP3/4
Bronze medal – third place	2012 London	Road time trial C4
World Road Championships
Gold medal – first place	2006 Aigle	Road race CP4
Gold medal – first place	2014 Greenville	Road time trial CP4
Bronze medal – third place	2014 Greenville	Road race CP4
World Track Championships
Gold medal – first place	2006 Aigle	Individual pursuit CP4
Gold medal – first place	2006 Aigle	1km time trial CP4
Bronze medal – third place	2011 Montichiari	1km time trial
Bronze medal – third place	2011 Montichiari	Team sprint C1-5

Jiří Bouška (born 30 December 1979) is a Czech former Paralympic cyclist who competed in international cycling competitions. He is a triple World champion in road cycling and has competed at the Paralympic Games four times winning five medals.
