= Roberto Alcaide =

Spanish cyclist (born 1978)

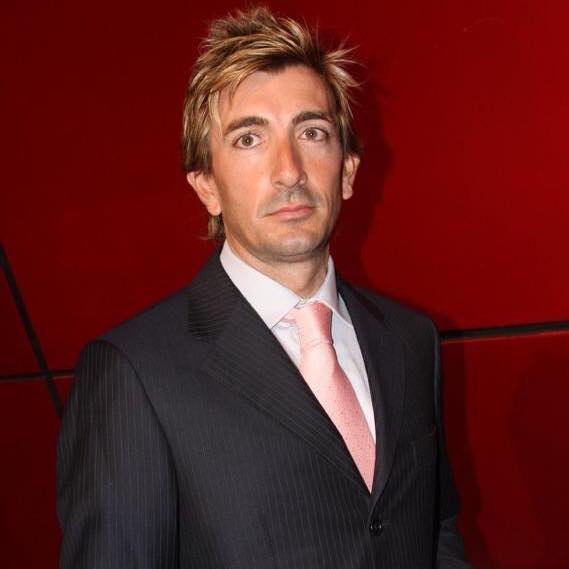
- Alcaide García at the gala of the Royal Medal Order of Sports Merit 2015

Personal information
- Full name: Roberto Alcaide García
- Nationality: Spanish
- Born: 22 March 1978 (age 48) Madrid, Spain

Sport
- Country: Spain
- Sport: Cycling

Roberto Alcaide García (born 22 March 1978 in Madrid) is a cyclist from Spain. He has a physical disability: He is a C4/LC2 type cyclist. Alcaide raced in the 2004 Summer Paralympics, where he became the first racer to finish in the Individual Pursuit track LC2 race and finished second in the Combined Road LC2 race. He raced at the 2008 Summer Paralympics, finishing second in the Individual Pursuit track LC2 race and third in the Road Trial LC2 race. Alcaide also raced at the 2012 Summer Paralympics. In November 2013, he was awarded an €8,000 scholarship from the Madrid Olympic Foundation to support his efforts in qualifying for the 2016 Summer Paralympics.
