= Cycling at the 2008 Summer Paralympics – Women's individual pursuit =

The women's individual pursuit at the 2008 Summer Paralympics took place on 9–10 September at the Laoshan Velodrome.

== Classification ==
The cyclists are given a classification depending on the type and extent of their disability. The classification system allows cyclists to compete against others with a similar level of function.

Cycling classes:

- B&VI 1–3: Blind and visually impaired cyclists.
- LC 1–4: Cyclists with a locomotor disability.
- CP 1–4: Cyclists with cerebral palsy.

== B&VI 1–3 ==
The women's individual pursuit (B&VI 1–3) event took place on 9 September at the Laoshan Velodrome.

Gold	Silver	Bronze
Great Britain (GBR)	Australia (AUS)	United States (USA)
Aileen Mcglynn; Ellen Hunter	Lindy Hou; Toireasa Gallagher	Karissa Whitsell; Mackenzie Woodring

=== Preliminaries ===
Q = Qualifier

Rank	Name	Time
1	Lindy Hou (AUS); Pilot: Toireasa Gallagher (AUS)	3:38.085 Q
2	Aileen Mcglynn (GBR); Pilot: Ellen Hunter (GBR)	3:40.997 Q
3	Karissa Whitsell (USA); Pilot: Mackenzie Woodring (USA)	3:42.237 Q
4	Jayne Parsons (NZL); Pilot: Annaliisa Farrell (NZL)	3:47.271 Q
5	Catherine Mary Walsh (IRL); Pilot: Joanna Hickey (IRL)	3:50.515
6	Iryna Fiadotava (BLR); Pilot: Alena Drazdova (BLR)	3:54.322
7	Genevieve Ouellet (CAN); Pilot: Mathilde Hupin (CAN)	3:54.909
8	Ana Lopez (ESP); Pilot: Marina Girona (ESP)	3:59.328
9	Iryna Parkhamovich (BLR); Pilot: Alesia Belaichuk (BLR)	4:02.820

== LC 1–2/CP 4 ==
The women's individual pursuit (LC 1–2/CP 4) event took place on 10 September at the Laoshan Velodrome.

Gold	Silver	Bronze
Sarah Storey; Great Britain	Jennifer Schuble; United States	Dong Jingping; China

=== Preliminaries ===
Q = Qualifier WR = World Record

Rank	Name	Factored time
1	Jennifer Schuble (USA)	3:35.514 Q WR
2	Sarah Storey (GBR)	3:40.492 Q WR
3	Dong Jingping (CHN)	3:49.130 Q
4	Ye Yaping (CHN)	3:51.508 Q
5	Greta Neimanas (USA)	3:57.966
6	Zhou Jufang (CHN)	4:00.504
7	Silvana Vinci (ITA)	4:02.148
8	Fiona Southorn (NZL)	4:06.965
9	Roxy Burns (RSA)	4:07.368
10	Anita Ruetz (AUT)	4:25.127

== LC 3–4/CP 3 ==
The women's individual pursuit (LC 3–4/CP 3) event took place on 10 September at the Laoshan Velodrome.

Gold	Silver	Bronze
Barbara Buchan; United States	Natalie Simanowski; Germany	Paula Tesoriero; New Zealand

=== Preliminaries ===
Q = Qualifier WR = World Record

Rank	Name	Factored time
1	Barbara Buchan (USA)	4:13.860 Q WR
2	Natalie Simanowski (GER)	4:16.176 Q WR
3	Paula Tesoriero (NZL)	4:22.862 Q
4	Jayme Paris (AUS)	4:24.666 Q
5	Tang Qi (CHN)	4:27.115
6	Niu Zhifeng (CHN)	4:32.381
7	Jane Armstrong (AUS)	4:35.768
8	Allison Jones (USA)	4:36.306
9	Susan van Staden (RSA)	4:44.792
10	Raquel Acinas (ESP)	4:51.156
