= Cycling at the 2008 Summer Paralympics – Women's time trial =

The Women's time trial track cycling events at the 2008 Summer Paralympics took place on September 7–8 at the Laoshan Velodrome.

== Classification ==
Cyclists are given a classification depending on the type and extent of their disability. The classification system allows cyclists to compete against others with a similar level of function.

Cycling classes are:

- B&VI 1–3: Blind and visually impaired cyclists
- LC 1–4: Cyclists with a locomotor disability
- CP 1–4: Cyclists with cerebral palsy

== B&VI 1–3 ==
The women's 1 km time trial (B&VI 1–3) took place on September 7.

WR = World Record

Rank	Name	Country	Time
1st place, gold medalist(s)	Aileen McGlynn; Pilot: Ellen Hunter	Great Britain	1:09.006 WR
2nd place, silver medalist(s)	Felicity Johnson; Pilot: Katie Parker	Australia	1:10.465
3rd place, bronze medalist(s)	Lindy Hou; Pilot: Katie Parker	Australia	1:12.463
4	Karissa Whitsell; Pilot: Mackenzie Woodring	United States	1:12.787
5	Jayne Parsons; Pilot: Annaliisa Farrell	New Zealand	1:14.048
6	Genevieve Ouellet; Pilot: Mathilde Hupin	Canada	1:15.639
7	Catherine Mary Walsh; Pilot: Joanna Hickey	Ireland	1:16.208
8	Ana Lopez; Pilot: Marina Girona	Spain	1:19.712

== LC1–2/CP 4 ==
The women's 500m time trial (LC1–2/CP 4) took place on September 8.

Rank	Name	Country	Time
1st place, gold medalist(s)	Jennifer Schuble	United States	0.34.3
2nd place, silver medalist(s)	Yaping Ye	China	+0.01.8
3rd place, bronze medalist(s)	Jingping Dong	China	+0.02.6
4	Jufang Zhou	China	+0.02.6
5	Sarah Storey	Great Britain	+0.04.0
6	Roxy Burns	South Africa	+0.04.6
7	Silvana Vinci	Italy	+0.05.6
8	Greta Neimanas	United States	+0.05.9
9	Fiona Southorn	New Zealand	+0.08.0
10	Anita Ruetz	Austria	+0.08.2

== LC3–4/CP 3 ==
The women's 500m time trial (LC 3–4/CP 3) took place on September 8.

Rank	Name	Country	Time
1st place, gold medalist(s)	Paula Tesoriero	New Zealand	0.43.3
2nd place, silver medalist(s)	Natalie Simanowski	Germany	+0.00.5
3rd place, bronze medalist(s)	Jayme Paris	Australia	+0.01.2
4	Jane Armstrong	Australia	+0.02.1
5	Qi Tang	China	+0.02.6
6	Allison Jones	United States	+0.03.1
7	Susan Van Staden	South Africa	+0.03.8
8	Barbara Buchan	United States	+0.03.8
9	Raquel Acinas	Spain	+0.05.4
10	Zhifeng Niu	China	+0.05.7
