= 2006 IPC Cycling World Championships =

- Venue: Aigle, Switzerland (SUI)
- Date: 11–18 September 2006
- Nations participating: 32
- Cyclists participating
- Events: 31

The 2006 IPC Cycling World Championships were the 2nd World Championships for track and road cycling for athletes with a physical disability. The Championships took place in Aigle, Switzerland from 11 to 18 September 2006, with track events on the first three days of competition, time trials on days 4 and 5, and road races on days 6 and 7.

Organised by the International Paralympic Committee, the event was the forerunner of the UCI organized Para-cycling Track and Road Championships, and the last to be organized by IPC Cycling; UCI took over the running of the event in 2007.

24 events were held on the track, while 34 events were held on the road.

== Medal table ==
Rank	Nation	Gold	Silver	Bronze	Total
1	Germany (GER)	11	8	5	24
2	Spain (ESP)	8	7	7	22
3	Great Britain (GBR)	8	4	3	15
4	Czech Republic (CZE)	7	3	2	12
5	Australia (AUS)	6	6	9	21
6	China (CHN)	5	5	4	14
7	France (FRA)	5	3	1	9
8	Austria (AUT)	2	5	5	12
9	United States (USA)	2	4	3	9
10	Netherlands (NED)	1	2	1	4
11	Denmark (DEN)	1	1	0	2
12	Switzerland (SUI)	1	0	2	3
13	Poland (POL)	1	0	0	1
14	Japan (JPN)	0	3	2	5
15	Belgium (BEL)	0	1	2	3
16	Sweden (SWE)	0	1	1	2
17	Romania (ROU)	0	1	0	1
17	Slovakia (SVK)	0	1	0	1
19	Italy (ITA)	0	0	3	3
20	Belarus (BLR)	0	0	2	2
20	South Africa (RSA)	0	0	2	2
22	Argentina (ARG)	0	0	1	1
22	New Zealand (NZL)	0	0	1	1
22	Norway (NOR)	0	0	1	1
Totals (24 entries)		58	55	57	170

== Track events ==
Event	Class	Gold		Silver		Bronze	
Men's events
Sprint	B & VI	Anthony Kappes; Barney Storey (GBR)		Ben Demery; Shaun Hopkins (AUS)		Bryce Lindores; Stephen Storer (AUS)	
Sprint	Team Sprint	Germany (GER); Guenter Brechtel; Mario Hammer; Pierre Senska		Spain (ESP); Javier Ochoa; Roberto Alcaide; Amador Granado		South Africa (RSA); Jaco Nel; Stephan Herholdt; Janos Plekker	
Kilo time trial	CP4	Jiri Bouska (CZE)	1:10	Masashi Ishii (JPN)	+ 0:00.1	Trent Deacon (AUS)	+ 0:02
Kilo time trial	CP3	Darren Kenny (GBR)	1:13	Javier Ochoa (ESP)	+0:04	Rodrigo Lopez Fernando (ARG)	+0:08
Kilo time trial	B & VI	Anthony Kappes; Barney Storey (GBR)	1:04	Leon Larkins; Tyson Lawrence (AUS)	+0:01	Ben Demery; Shaun Hopkins (AUS)	+0:01
Kilo time trial	LC4	Michael Teuber (GER)	1:23	Pierre Senska (GER)	+ 0:03	Alexander Hohlrieder (AUT)	+0:04
Kilo time trial	LC3	Tobias Graf (GER)	1:20	Laurent Thirionet (FRA)	+0:00	Fabrizio Macchi (ITA)	+0:01
Kilo time trial	LC2	Jody Cundy (GBR)	1:11	Jiří Ježek (CZE)	+0:01	Amador Granado (ESP)	+0:01
Kilo time trial	LC1	Michael Gallagher (AUS)	1:09 WR	Wolfgang Eibeck (AUT)	+0:01	Mark Bristow (GBR)	+0:01
Individual Pursuit	CP4	Jiri Bouska (CZE)	3:37	Trent Deacon (AUS)	+ 0:07	Masashi Ishii (JPN)	+ 0:10
Individual Pursuit	CP3	Darren Kenny (GBR)	3:45	Javier Ochoa (ESP)	+0:02	Maurice Eckhard (ESP)	+0:18
Individual Pursuit	B & VI	Christian Venge; David Llaurado (ESP)	4:32	Francisco González; Juan Francisco Suarez (ESP)	+0:05	Leon Larkins; Tyson Lawrence (AUS)	+0:01*; Bronze final
Individual Pursuit	LC4	Michael Teuber (GER)		Juan José Méndez (ESP)		Alexander Hohlrieder (AUT)	
Individual Pursuit	LC3	Laurent Thirionet (FRA)		Tobias Graf (GER)		Fabrizio Macchi (ITA)	
Individual Pursuit	LC2	Roberto Alcaide (ESP)		Jiří Ježek (CZE)		Jan Boyen (BEL)	
Individual Pursuit	LC1	Michael Gallagher (AUS)		Wolfgang Eibeck (AUT)		Wolfgang Sacher (GER)	
Women's events
time trial	LC3-4, CP3 – 2 lap	Natalie Simanowski (GER)	27.18	Barbara Buchan (USA)	+ 0.51	Alison Jones (USA)	+ 1.48
time trial	LC3	Natalie Simanowski (GER)	45.00	Qi Tang (CHN)	+ 0:01	Jane Armstrong (AUS)	+ 0:02
time trial	LC2	Ye Yaping (CHN)	42.00	Angela Fleming (AUS)	+ 0:01	Wang Jirong (CHN)	+ 0:01
time trial	LC1	Zhou Jufang (CHN)	0:38	An Fengzhen (CHN)	+ 0:01	Sarah Bailey (GBR)	+ 0:02
time trial	B&VI	Aileen McGlynn; Ellen Hunter (GBR)	1:11	Karissa Whitsell; Katie Compton (USA)	+ 0:02	Michaela Fuchs; Sonja John (GER)	+ 0:05
Individual pursuit	LC2-CP4	Wang Jirong (CHN)	4:15	Karen Jacobsen (DEN)	+ 0.02	Ye Yaping (CHN)	-
Individual pursuit	LC1	Sarah Bailey (GBR)	3:52	Claire McLean (AUS)	+ 0:06	Zhou Jufang (CHN)	+ 0:14
Individual pursuit	B&VI	Lindy Hou; Toireasa Gallagher (AUS)	3:40	Karissa Whitsell; Katie Compton (USA)	+ 0:03	Jayne Parsons; Michelle Laurenson (NZL)	+ 0:08

== Road events ==
Event	Class	Gold	Silver	Bronze
Men's events
Time Trial	LC4	Michael Teuber (GER)	Juan José Méndez (ESP)	Alexander Hohlrieder (AUT)
Time Trial	LC3	Laurent Thirionet (FRA)	Michal Stark (CZE)	Fabrizio Macchi (ITA)
Time Trial	LC2	Jiri Jedek (CZE)	Carol-Eduard Novak (ROU)	Christian Wilberger (AUT)
Time Trial	HCB	Marcel Pipek (CZE)	Max Weber (GER)	Heinz Frei (SUI)
Time Trial	HCA	Christoph Etzlstorfer (AUT)	Wolfgang Schattauer (AUT)	Alain Quittet (FRA)
Time Trial	HCC	Franz Nietlispach (SUI)	Elmar Sternath (AUT)	Bruno Huber (SUI)
Time Trial	CP4	Michel Alcaine (FRA)	Masashi Ishii (JPN)	Cesar Neira (ESP)
Time Trial	CP4 – 3 laps	Michel Alcaine (FRA)	Masashi Ishii (JPN)	Cesar Neira (ESP)
Time Trial	CP3 – 2 laps	Javier Ochoa (ESP)	Darren Kenny (GBR)	Maurice Eckard (ESP)
Time Trial	CP1 – 1 lap	Aitor Oroza (ESP)	Mark Homan (NED)	Matthias Neumann (GER)
Time Trial	B & VI 3 – laps	Francisco González; Juan Francisco Suarez (ESP)	Moisus Osuna; Jesus Sacido (ESP)	Marc Eymard; Yves Godimus (BEL)
Road Race	LC3 – 6 laps	Laurent Thirionet (FRA)	Tobias Graf (AUT)	Scott Gadberry (USA)
Road Race	LC2 – 6 laps	Roberto Alcaide (ESP)	Jan Boyen (BEL)	Morten Jahr (NOR)
Road Race	LC1 – 7 laps	Wolfgang Sacher (GER)	Michael Lindgren (SWE)	Mark Bristow (GBR)
Road Race	LC4 – 4 laps	Alexander Hohlrieder (AUT)	Pierre Senska (GER)	Juan José Méndez (ESP)
Road Race	HCB – 4 laps	Stefan Baeumann (GER)	Max Weber (GER)	Marcel Pipek (CZE)
Road Race	HCC – 4 laps	Alejandro Arbor (USA)	Heribert Fering (GER)	Vincente Arzo (ESP)
Road Race	HCA – 3 laps	Wolfgang Schattauer (AUT)	Rastislav Tureček (SVK)	Christoph Etzlstorfer (AUT)
Road Race	CP4 – 5 laps	Jiri Bouska (CZE)	Michel Alcaine (FRA)	Lubos Jirka (CZE)
Road Race	CP3 – 4 laps	Javier Ochoa (ESP)	Darren Kenny (GBR)	Jaco Nel (RSA)
Road Race	CP2 – 2 laps	David Stone (GBR)	Helmut Winterleitner (AUS)	Mutsuhiko Ogawa (JPN)
Road Race	CP1 – 2 laps	Aitor Oroza (ESP)	Matthias Neumann (GER)	Mark Homan (NED)
Road Race	B&VI	Krzysztof Kosikowski; Artur Korc (POL)	Stéphane Cote; Pierre Olivier Boily (FRA)	Leon Larkins; Tyson Lawrence (AUS)
Women's events
Time Trial	LC4	Andrea Eskau (GER)	Monique van der Vorst (NED)	Dorothee Vieth (GER)
Time Trial	LC3-4, CP3	Natalie Simanowski (GER)	Barbara Buchan (USA)	Allison Jones (USA)
Time Trial	LC2, CP4	Karen Jacobsen (DEN)	Ye Yaping (CHN)	Angela Fleming (AUS)
Time Trial	CP2	Zaneta Halova (CZE)	no medals awarded	
Time Trial	LC1	Claire McLean (AUS)	Sarah Bailey (GBR)	Zhou Jufang (CHN)
Time Trial	B & VI	Karissa Whitsell; Katie Compton (USA)	Cinzia Couluzzi; Giovanna Troldi (ITA)	Iryana Parkhamovich; Alesia Belaichuk (BLR)
Road Race	HCB-C – 2 laps	Monique van der Vorst (NED)	Andrea Eskau (GER)	Jessica Hedlund (SWE)
Road Race	LC3/4 – CP3 – 4 laps	Qi Tang (CHN)	Zhi Feng Niu (CHN)	Natalie Simanowski (GER)
Road Race	LC1 – 5 laps	Zhou Jufang (CHN)	Sarah Bailey (GBR)	Claire McLean (AUS)
Road Race	CP1-2	Zaneta Halova (CZE)	no medal awarded	
Road Race	B&VI	Lindy Hou; Toireasa Gallagher (AUS)	Yi Mei Xu; Xiao Lei Yan (CHN)	Iryana Fiadotava; Natallia Piatrova (BLR))
