= Cycling at the 2008 Summer Paralympics – Women's road time trial =

The women's individual time trial events in cycling at the 2008 Summer Paralympics took place on 12 September at the Changping Triathlon Venue.

== Handcycle class ==
=== HC A/HC B/HC C ===
The women's individual time trial HC A/HC B/HC C event took place at 10:41.

Gold	Silver	Bronze
Rachel Morris; Great Britain	Monique van der Vorst; Netherlands	Dorothee Vieth; Germany

Rank	Name	Cat	Time	Factor (%)	Final time with % factor
1	Rachel Morris (GBR)	HCB	25:39.22	81.671	25:39.22
2	Monique van der Vorst (NED)	HCC	23:40.64	100.000	23:40.64
3	Dorothee Vieth (GER)	HCC	23:41.95	100.000	23:41.95
4	Ursula Schwaller (SUI)	HCB	29:29.66	81.671	29:29.66
5	Andrea Eskau (GER)	HCC	24:06.03	100.000	24:06.03
6	Mel Leckie (AUS)	HCB	30:32.61	81.671	30:32.61
7	Laura de Vaan (NED)	HCC	25:15.15	100.000	25:15.15
8	Annemarie Donaldson (NZL)	HCB	32:13.21	81.671	32:13.21
9	Shauna White (CAN)	HCC	26:45.20	100.000	26:45.20
10	Catherine Martin (FRA)	HCC	27:14.60	100.000	27:14.60
11	Marianne Maiboell (DEN)	HCC	32:27.95	100.000	32:27.95

== Cerebral palsy and locomotor disability classes ==
=== LC 1/LC 2/CP 4 ===
The women's individual time trial LC 1/LC 2/CP 4 event took place at 14:56.

Gold	Silver	Bronze
Sarah Storey; Great Britain	Jennifer Schuble; United States	Zhou Jufang; China

Rank	Name	Cat	Time	Factor (%)	Final time with % factor
1	Sarah Storey (GBR)	LC1	37:16.65	100.000	37:16.65
2	Jennifer Schuble (USA)	CP4	40:42.28	94.950	40:42.28
3	Zhou Jufang (CHN)	LC1	39:30.84	100.000	39:30.84
4	Greta Neimanas (USA)	LC1	40:26.09	100.000	40:26.09
5	Ye Yaping (CHN)	LC2	43:58.22	93.336	43:58.22
6	Dong Jingping (CHN)	LC2	44:08.71	93.336	44:08.71
7	Fiona Southorn (NZL)	LC1	43:02.78	100.000	43:02.78
8	Silvana Vinci (ITA)	CP4	47:28.24	94.950	47:28.24
9	Anita Ruetz (AUT)	CP4	50:25.44	94.950	50:25.44
10	Roxy Burns (RSA)	CP4	53:07.14	94.950	53:07.14

=== LC 3/LC 4/CP 3 ===
The women's individual time trial LC 3/LC 4/CP 3 event took place at 15:07.

Gold	Silver	Bronze
Barbara Buchan; United States	Allison Jones; United States	Paula Tesoriero; New Zealand

Rank	Name	Cat	Time	Factor (%)	Final time with % factor
1	Barbara Buchan (USA)	CP3	44:45.17	94.919	44:45.17
2	Allison Jones (USA)	LC3	44:42.88	100.000	44:42.88
3	Paula Tesoriero (NZL)	LC3	45:00.92	100.000	45:00.92
4	Natalie Simanowski (GER)	LC3	45:38.23	100.000	45:38.23
5	Tang Qi (CHN)	LC3	47:23.63	100.000	47:23.63
6	Raquel Acinas (ESP)	LC3	47:30.48	100.000	47:30.48
7	Niu Zhifeng (CHN)	LC3	48:45.64	100.000	48:45.64
8	Jayme Paris (AUS)	CP3	52:51.82	94.919	52:51.82
9	Susan van Staden (RSA)	LC3	50:15.34	100.000	50:15.34
10	Jane Armstrong (AUS)	LC3	50:27.73	100.000	50:27.73

== Blind and visually impaired class ==
=== B&VI 1–3 ===
The women's individual time trial B&VI 1-3 event took place at 15:19.

Gold	Silver	Bronze
Whitsell/Woodring; United States	Fiadotava/Drazdova; Belarus	Parsons/Farrell; New Zealand

Rank	Name	Time	Time behind	Avg. speed
1	Whitsell/Woodring (USA)	36:14.87		41.050
2	Fiadotava/Drazdova (BLR)	36:58.98	+44.11	
3	Parsons/Farrell (NZL)	38:40.40	+2:25.53	
4	Hou/Gallagher (AUS)	39:01.62	+2:46.75	
5	Lopez/Girona (ESP)	39:11.65	+2:56.78	
6	Coluzzi/Merloni (ITA)	39:36.06	+3:21.19	
7	Walsh/Hickey (IRL)	40:09.67	+3:54.80	
8	Parkhamovich/Belaichuk (BLR)	40:19.02	+4:04.15	
9	Wisniewska/Ostrowska (POL)	41:09.77	+4:54.90	
10	Ouellet/Hupin (CAN)	42:53.16	+6:38.29	
