= Cycling at the 2008 Summer Paralympics – Women's individual pursuit (B&VI 1–3) =

Women's individual pursuit (B&VI 1–3) at the XIII Paralympic Games
- Venue: Laoshan Velodrome
- Dates: September 9
- Competitors: 9 from 9 nations
- Winning time: 3:39.809

Medalists
1st place, gold medalist(s)		Aileen McGlynn & Ellen Hunter	Great Britain
2nd place, silver medalist(s)		Lindy Hou & Toireasa Gallagher	Australia
3rd place, bronze medalist(s)		Karissa Whitsell & Mackenzie Woodring	United States

The Women's individual pursuit (B&VI 1–3) event at the 2008 Summer Paralympics took place on September 9 at the Laoshan Velodrome.

== Preliminaries ==
Q = Qualifier WR = World Record

Rank	Name	Time
1	Lindy Hou (AUS); Pilot: Toireasa Gallagher (AUS)	3:38.085 Q
2	Aileen McGlynn (GBR); Pilot: Ellen Hunter (GBR)	3:40.997 Q
3	Karissa Whitsell (USA); Pilot: Mackenzie Woodring (USA)	3:42.237 Q
4	Jayne Parsons (NZL); Pilot: Annaliisa Farrell (NZL)	3:47.271 Q
5	Catherine Mary Walsh (IRL); Pilot: Joanna Hickey (IRL)	3:50.515
6	Iryna Fiadotava (BLR); Pilot: Alena Drazdova (BLR)	3:54.322
7	Genevieve Ouellet (CAN); Pilot: Mathilde Hupin (CAN)	3:54.909
8	Ana Lopez (ESP); Pilot: Marina Girona (ESP)	3:59.328
9	Iryna Parkhamovich (BLR); Pilot: Alesia Belaichuk (BLR)	4:02.820

== Finals ==
Gold medal match

Name	Time	Rank
Aileen McGlynn (GBR); Ellen Hunter (GBR)	3:39.809	1
Lindy Hou (AUS); Toireasa Gallagher (AUS)	3:41.494	2

Bronze medal match

Name	Time	Rank
Karissa Whitsell (USA); Mackenzie Woodring (USA)	3:41.521	3
Jayne Parsons (NZL); Annaliisa Farrell (NZL)	3:47.900	4
