= Cycling at the 2008 Summer Paralympics – Women's individual pursuit (LC 3–4/CP 3) =

Women's individual pursuit LC 3–4/CP 3 at the XIII Paralympic Games
- Venue: Laoshan Velodrome
- Dates: 10 September
- Competitors: 10 from 7 nations
- Winning time: 4:15.848

Medalists
1st place, gold medalist(s)		Barbara Buchan	United States
2nd place, silver medalist(s)		Natalie Simanowski	Germany
3rd place, bronze medalist(s)		Paula Tesoriero	New Zealand

The women's individual pursuit (LC 3–4/CP 3) event in cycling at the 2008 Summer Paralympics took place on 10 September at the Laoshan Velodrome.

== Preliminaries ==
Q = Qualifier WR = World Record

Rank	Name	Class	Time	Factor (%)	Final time with % factor
1	Barbara Buchan (USA)	CP3	4:31.334 WR	93.560	4:13.860 Q
2	Natalie Simanowski (GER)	LC3	4:16.176 WR	100.000	4:16.176 Q
3	Paula Tesoriero (NZL)	LC3	4:22.862	100.000	4:22.862 Q
4	Jayme Paris (AUS)	CP3	4:42.884	93.560	4:24.666 Q
5	Tang Qi (CHN)	LC3	4:27.115	100.000	4:27.115
6	Niu Zhifeng (CHN)	LC3	4:32.381	100.000	4:32.381
7	Jane Armstrong (AUS)	LC3	4:35.768	100.000	4:35.768
8	Allison Jones (USA)	LC3	4:36.306	100.000	4:36.306
9	Susan van Staden (RSA)	LC3	4:44.792	100.000	4:44.792
10	Raquel Acinas (ESP)	LC3	4:51.156	100.000	4:51.156

== Finals ==
Gold medal match

Name	Class	Time	Factor (%)	Final time with % factor	Rank
Barbara Buchan (USA)	CP3	4:33.459	93.560	4:15.848	1
Natalie Simanowski (GER)	CP3	4:19.396	100.000	4:19.396	2

Bronze medal match

Name	Class	Time	Factor (%)	Final time with % factor	Rank
Paula Tesoriero (NZL)	LC3	4:26.080	100.000	4:26.080	3
Jayme Paris (AUS)	CP3	4:44.938	93.560	4:26.587	4
