= Cycling at the 2004 Summer Paralympics – Women's time trial =

The women's 1 km time trial track events in cycling at the 2004 Summer Paralympics were held at the Olympic Velodrome on 18 and 21 September.

There were two classes, one for blind and visually impaired competitors, the second combining cerebral palsy and locomotor disabilities.

== B 1–3 ==
Women's 1 km time trial tandem B1–3 at the XII Paralympic Games
- Paralympic cycling (track)
- Venue: Olympic Velodrome
- Dates: 18 September 2004
- Competitors: 13 from 10 nations

Medalists
1st place, gold medalist(s)		Aileen McGlynn; Ellen Hunter	Great Britain
2nd place, silver medalist(s)		Karissa Whitsell; Katie Compton	United States
3rd place, bronze medalist(s)		Lindy Hou; Janelle Lindsay	Australia

The tandem B1–3 event was won by Aileen McGlynn and her sighted pilot Ellen Hunter, representing Great Britain.

=== Final round ===
18 Sept. 2004, 12:50

Rank	Athlete	Time	Notes
1st place, gold medalist(s)	Aileen McGlynn (GBR); Ellen Hunter (GBR)	1:11.16	WR
2nd place, silver medalist(s)	Karissa Whitsell (USA); Katie Compton (USA)	1:11.22	
3rd place, bronze medalist(s)	Lindy Hou (AUS); Janelle Lindsay (AUS)	1:11.78	
4	Kelly McCombie (AUS); Janet Shaw (AUS)	1:12.53	
5	Tone Gravvold (NOR); May Britt Hartwell (NOR)	1:13.51	
6	Lyn Lepore (AUS); Jenny MacPherson (AUS)	1:15.45	
7	Eva Fuenfgeld (GER); Michaela Fuchs (GER)	1:16.13	
8	Merja Hanski (FIN); Virve Taljavirta (FIN)	1:17.75	
9	Yadviha Skorabahataya (BLR); Natallia Piatrova (BLR)	1:18.04	
10	Yan Xiaolei (CHN); Xu Yi Mei (CHN)	1:18.40	
11	Ana Miguelez (ESP); Beatriz Eva Grande (ESP)	1:18.49	
12	Shawn Marsolais (CAN); Lisa Sweeney (CAN)	1:18.73	
13	Iryna Fiadotava (BLR); Aksana Zviahintsava (BLR)	1:25.30	

== LC 1–4/CP 3/4 ==
Women's 1 km time trial LC1–4/CP 3/4 at the XII Paralympic Games
- Paralympic cycling (track)
- Venue: Olympic Velodrome
- Dates: 21 September 2004
- Competitors: 12 from 8 nations

Medalists
1st place, gold medalist(s)		Zhou Jufang	China
2nd place, silver medalist(s)		An Fengzhen	China
3rd place, bronze medalist(s)		Tang Qi	China

The LC1–4/CP 3/4 event was won by Zhou Jufang, representing China, in a Chinese clean sweep. Standings were decided by calculated times.

=== Final round ===
21 Sept. 2004, 13:10

Rank	Athlete	Real time	Factor	Time	Notes
1st place, gold medalist(s)	Zhou Jufang (CHN)	1:15.49	100.000	1:15.49	WR
2nd place, silver medalist(s)	An Fengzhen (CHN)	1:17.71	100.000	1:17.71	
3rd place, bronze medalist(s)	Tang Qi (CHN)	1:30.14	86.966	1:18.39	WR
4	Allison Jones (USA)	1:31.53	86.966	1:19.60	
5	Karen Jacobsen (DEN)	1:21.80	97.691	1:19.91	WR
6	Barbara Buchan (USA)	1:31.26	89.458	1:21.63	WR
7	Fiona Southorn (NZL)	1:21.86	100.000	1:21.86	
8	Claire McLean (AUS)	1:21.95	100.000	1:21.95	
9	Wang Jirong (CHN)	1:24.52	98.986	1:23.66	WR
10	Susan van Staden (RSA)	1:36.66	86.966	1:24.06	
11	Sara Tretola (SUI)	1:25.50	100.000	1:25.50	
12	Daniela Prochazkova (CZE)	1:35.34	97.691	1:33.13	
