= LC4 =

LC4 may refer to:

- Chaise Longue LC4, a chaise longue designed by the Swiss architect Le Corbusier and French architect Charlotte Perriand
- Buckley LC-4 Witchcraft, all-metal monoplane aircraft
- Buick LC4 V6 car engine
- KTM LC4, 1-cylinder 4-stroke motorcycle engine
- LC4 (classification), para-cycling classification
- Cytochrome c oxidase (launch complex 4), a component of the electron transport system
- Cape Canaveral Air Force Station Launch Complex 4, one of the first series of launch complexes to be built at Cape Canaveral Air Force Station, used in the 1950s.
- Vandenberg Air Force Base Space Launch Complex 4, a launch site at Vandenberg Air Force Base, currently active.

== See also ==
- Local Council IV (LCIV), a type of local administration in Uganda; see Local Council (Uganda)
- Late Cypriot IV (LC IV), a period of Bronze Age Prehistoric Cyprus
- Mac LC IV, informally referring to the Apple Macintosh LC III+
- Launch Complex 4 (disambiguation)
- LC (disambiguation)
