= HCB =

HCB may refer to:

- Hackbridge railway station, a railway station in South London
- Harmoni Central Busway, former name of an active BRT station in Jakarta
- Hampshire Cricket Board, the governing body for cricket in Hampshire, England
- Hamptons Collegiate Baseball, a summer baseball organization in New York State
- HCB (classification), a paralympic cycling classification
- HCB South Tyrol, an ice hockey club in Italy
- Henri Cartier-Bresson, a French photographer considered to be the father of modern photojournalism
- Hexachlorobenzene, a toxic fungicide formerly used as a seed treatment
- Homemade chemical bomb, an explosive device that can be made easily from volatile household chemicals
- Hydrocarbonoclastic bacteria, a form of oil biodegrader
- HCB, a fiscal sponsorship program owned by Hack Club
