= New Zealand at the 2008 Summer Paralympics =

- IPC code: NZL
- NPC: Paralympics New Zealand
- Website: paralympics.org.nz

in Beijing
- Competitors: 30 in 7 sports
- Flag bearer: Sholto Taylor
- Medals Ranked 24th: Gold 5 Silver 3 Bronze 4 Total 12

Summer Paralympics appearances (overview)
- 1968; 1972; 1976; 1980; 1984; 1988; 1992; 1996; 2000; 2004; 2008; 2012; 2016; 2020; 2024

New Zealand sent a delegation to compete at the 2008 Summer Paralympics in Beijing. The country was represented by thirty athletes competing in 7 sports: athletics, boccia, cycling, power-lifting, shooting, swimming and wheelchair rugby.

== Medallists ==
Medal	Name	Sport	Event
Gold	Cameron Leslie	Swimming	Men's 150 m individual medley SM4
Gold	Sophie Pascoe	Swimming	Woman's 100 m backstroke S10
Gold	Sophie Pascoe	Swimming	Woman's 100 m breaststroke SB9
Gold	Sophie Pascoe	Swimming	Woman's 200 m individual medley SM10
Gold	Paula Tesoriero	Cycling	Woman's 500 m time trial (LC3–4/CP 3)
Silver	Kate Horan	Athletics	Women's 200 m T44
Silver	Sophie Pascoe	Swimming	Women's 100 m Butterfly S10
Silver	Daniel Sharp	Swimming	Men's 100 m breaststroke SB13
Bronze	Annaliisa Farrell; Jayne Parsons	Cycling	Time trial B&VI 1–3
Bronze	Michael Johnson	Shooting	Mixed R4-10 m air rifle standing SH2
Bronze	Paula Tesoriero	Cycling	Women's individual pursuit (LC 1–2/CP 4)
Bronze	Paula Tesoriero	Cycling	Time trial LC 3–4/CP 3

== Sports ==
=== Athletics ===
==== Men's track ====
Athlete	Class	Event	Heats		Semifinal		Final	
Athlete	Class	Event	Result	Rank	Result	Rank	Result	Rank
Tim Prendergast	T13	800m	—N/a				1:56.28	6
Tim Prendergast	T13	1500m	4:13.54	9 Q	—N/a		4:09.09	5
Tim Prendergast	T13	5000m	15:47.26	6 Q	—N/a		15:13.60	4
Matt Slade	T37	100m	12.54	6 Q	—N/a		12.46	4
Matt Slade	T37	200m	25.53	10	did not advance			

==== Men's field ====
Athlete	Class	Event	Final		
Athlete	Class	Event	Result	Points	Rank
Terry Faleva'ai	F33-34/52	Shot put	9.65	895	12

==== Women's track ====
Athlete	Class	Event	Heats		Semifinal		Final	
Athlete	Class	Event	Result	Rank	Result	Rank	Result	Rank
Kate Horan	T44	100m	14.04	6 q	—N/a		14.01	5
Kate Horan	T44	200m	—N/a				28.36	2nd place, silver medalist(s)

==== Women's field ====
Athlete	Class	Event	Final		
Athlete	Class	Event	Result	Points	Rank
Jessica Hamill	F32-34/51-53	Discus throw	19.27	1008	7
Jessica Hamill	F32-34/51-53	Shot put	6.77	898	11
Jessica Hamill	F33-34/52-53	Javelin throw	13.68	963	10

=== Boccia ===
Athlete	Event	Preliminaries			Quarterfinals	Semifinals	Final	
Athlete	Event	Opponent	Opposition Score	Rank	Opposition Score	Opposition Score	Opposition Score	Rank
Liam Sanders	Mixed individual BC1	Moran (IRL)	L 3-7	3	did not advance			
Liam Sanders	Mixed individual BC1	Marques (POR)	W 6-0	3	did not advance			
Liam Sanders	Mixed individual BC1	Smith (GBR)	W 5-2	3	did not advance			
Liam Sanders	Mixed individual BC1	Aandalen (NOR)	L 2-5	3	did not advance			
Keri Bonner	Mixed individual BC2	Murray (GBR)	L 0-17	4	did not advance			
Keri Bonner	Mixed individual BC2	Hirose (JPN)	L 1-8	4	did not advance			
Keri Bonner	Mixed individual BC2	Loung J (HKG)	L 1-4	4	did not advance			
Jeremy Morriss	Mixed individual BC2	Kwok H Y K (HKG)	L 2-3	2	did not advance			
Jeremy Morriss	Mixed individual BC2	Toon (NZL)	W 9-4	2	did not advance			
Jeremy Morriss	Mixed individual BC2	Wilhelmsen (NOR)	W 10-1	2	did not advance			
Maurice Toon	Mixed individual BC2	Kwok H Y K (HKG)	L 3-4	3	did not advance			
Maurice Toon	Mixed individual BC2	Morriss (NZL)	L 4-9	3	did not advance			
Maurice Toon	Mixed individual BC2	Wilhelmsen (NOR)	W 21-0	3	did not advance			
Henk Dijkstra	Mixed individual BC3	Polychronidis (GRE)	L 0-19	3	did not advance			
Henk Dijkstra	Mixed individual BC3	Sukkarath (THA)	L 4-5	3	did not advance			
Henk Dijkstra	Mixed individual BC3	Zhu H (CHN)	W 13-0	3	did not advance			
Amanda Slade	Mixed individual BC3	Jeong H W (KOR)	L 0-14	4	did not advance			
Amanda Slade	Mixed individual BC3	Peixoto (POR)	L 0-12	4	did not advance			
Amanda Slade	Mixed individual BC3	Visaratanunta (THA)	W 11-0	4	did not advance			
Keri Bonner; Jeremy Morriss; Liam Sanders; Maurice Toon	Team BC1-2	China (CHN)	L 4-8	3	did not advance			
Keri Bonner; Jeremy Morriss; Liam Sanders; Maurice Toon	Team BC1-2	Hong Kong (HKG)	L 2-8	3	did not advance			
Henk Dijkstra; Greig Jackson; Amanda Slade	Pairs BC3	Costa (POR); Peixoto (POR); Raimundo (POR)	L 4-8	4	did not advance			
Henk Dijkstra; Greig Jackson; Amanda Slade	Pairs BC3	Punsnit (THA); Sukkarath (THA); Visaratanunta (THA)	W 4-2	4	did not advance			
Henk Dijkstra; Greig Jackson; Amanda Slade	Pairs BC3	Michos (GRE); Polychronidis (GRE); Stavropoulou (GRE)	L 2-3	4	did not advance			

=== Cycling ===
==== Women's road ====
Athlete	Event	Time	Rank
Annemarie Donaldson	Women's road race HC A/B/C	1:39:22	11
Annemarie Donaldson	Women's road time trial HC A/B/C	32:13.21	8
Fiona Southorn	Women's road time trial LC1/LC2/CP4	43:02.78	7
Paula Tesoriero	Women's road time trial LC3/LC4/CP3	45:00.92	3rd place, bronze medalist(s)
Jayne Parsons; Annaliisa Farrell (pilot)	Women's road race B&VI 1-3	2:01:27	8
Jayne Parsons; Annaliisa Farrell (pilot)	Women's road time trial B&VI 1-3	38:40.40	3rd place, bronze medalist(s)

==== Women's track ====
Athlete	Event	Qualification		Final	
Athlete	Event	Time	Rank	Opposition Time	Rank
Fiona Southorn	Women's individual pursuit LC1-2/CP4	4:06.965	8	did not advance	
Fiona Southorn	Women's time trial LC1-2/CP4	—N/a		42.0	9
Paula Tesoriero	Women's individual pursuit LC3-4/CP3	4:22.862	3 q	Paris (AUS); W 4:26.080	3rd place, bronze medalist(s)
Paula Tesoriero	Women's time trial LC3-4/CP3	—N/a		43.3	1st place, gold medalist(s)
Jayne Parsons; Annaliisa Farrell (pilot)	Women's individual pursuit B&VI 1-3	3:47.271	4 q	Whitsell (USA) / Woodring (USA); L 3:47.900	4
Jayne Parsons; Annaliisa Farrell (pilot)	Women's time trial B&VI 1-3	—N/a		1:14.048	5

=== Powerlifting ===
Athlete	Event	Result	Rank
George Taamaru	+100kg	NMR	

=== Shooting ===
Athlete	Event	Qualification		Final		
Athlete	Event	Score	Rank	Score	Total	Rank
Michael Johnson	Mixed 10m air rifle prone SH2	599	9	did not advance		
Michael Johnson	Mixed 10m air rifle standing SH2	597	7 Q	104.2	701.2	3rd place, bronze medalist(s)

=== Swimming ===
==== Men ====
Athlete	Class	Event	Heats		Final	
Athlete	Class	Event	Result	Rank	Result	Rank
Cameron Leslie	S5	50m butterfly	43.20	6 Q	44.43	6
Cameron Leslie	S5	50m freestyle	38.67	9	did not advance	
Cameron Leslie	S5	200m freestyle	—N/a		2:57.21	6
Cameron Leslie	SM4	150m individual medley	2:40.43	1 Q	2:33.57 WR	1st place, gold medalist(s)
Daniel Sharp	S13	50m freestyle	25.30	8 Q	25.50	8
Daniel Sharp	S13	100m freestyle	58.85	14	did not advance	
Daniel Sharp	SB13	100m breaststroke	1:10.81	4 Q	1:08.73	2nd place, silver medalist(s)

==== Women ====
Athlete	Class	Event	Heats		Final	
Athlete	Class	Event	Result	Rank	Result	Rank
Sophie Pascoe	S10	100m backstroke	1:11.26	1 Q	1:10.57 WR	1st place, gold medalist(s)
Sophie Pascoe	S10	100m butterfly	1:12.93	4 Q	1:10.53	2nd place, silver medalist(s)
Sophie Pascoe	S10	100m freestyle	1:05.90	9	did not advance	
Sophie Pascoe	SB9	100m breaststroke	1:24.54	1 Q	1:22.58	1st place, gold medalist(s)
Sophie Pascoe	SM10	200m individual medley	2:39.40	1 Q	2:35.21	1st place, gold medalist(s)

=== Wheelchair rugby ===
Squad list	Group stage				Knockout stage		
Squad list	Pool Match 1 Opposition Result	Pool Match 2 Opposition Result	Pool Match 3 Opposition Result	Rank	Semifinal Opposition Result	Final Opposition Result	Rank
Daniel Buckingham (captain); Tim Johnson; David Klinkhamer; Curtis Palmer; Sholto Taylor; Geremy Tinker; Jai Waite; Adam Wakeford	Australia; L 38–39	Great Britain; L 38–39	Germany; W 40–31	3	Classification 5-8; China; W 47–34	Classification 5–6; Germany; W 28–25	5

== See also ==
- 2008 Summer Paralympics
- New Zealand at the Paralympics
- New Zealand at the 2008 Summer Olympics
