= Alain Quittet =

French sports shooter and former Paralympic road cyclist

Personal information
- Born: 8 August 1956 (age 69) Audincourt, France

Sport
- Country: France
- Sport: Paralympic shooting
- Disability: Paraplegia
Medal record
Paralympic cycling
Representing France
Paralympic Games
Bronze medal – third place	2008 Beijing	Road time trial HC A
World Championships
Silver medal – second place	2007 Bordeaux	Road race HC A
Silver medal – second place	2007 Bordeaux	Road time trial HC A
Silver medal – second place	2010 Baie-Comeau	Road time trial H1
Silver medal – second place	2011 Roskilde	Road race H1
Bronze medal – third place	2006 Aigle	Road time trial HC A
Bronze medal – third place	2011 Roskilde	Team relay

Alain Quittet (born 8 August 1956) is a French sports shooter and former Paralympic road cyclist. He has won six medals at the UCI Para-cycling World Championships and a Paralympic bronze medalist.
