= Whaikaha - Ministry of Disabled People =

New Zealand government ministry

Agency overview
- Formed: 2022
- Preceding agency: Disability functions of the Ministry of Health and Ministry of Social Development; Office for Disability Issues
- Jurisdiction: New Zealand
- Headquarters: The Aurora Centre 56 The Terrace Wellington 6011
- Minister responsible: Louise Upston, Minister for Disability Issues
- Agency executive: Paula Tesoriero, Chief Executive
- Parent agency: Ministry of Social Development
- Website: www.whaikaha.govt.nz

Whaikaha - Ministry of Disabled People is a government ministry within New Zealand. Its mission is to improve outcomes for disabled people in New Zealand, reform the wider disability system, and coordinate the Government's disability policies. Whaikaha formally came into existence on 1 July 2022, and became a stand-alone ministry in December 2024. It was established to lead a partnership between the disability community, Māori and the Government, taking over the disability functions of the Ministry of Health and the Ministry of Social Development. The ministry aims to transform the disability system in line with the Enabling Good Lives (EGL) approach.

== Functions and responsibilities ==
Whaikaha was established with two purposes; [to] lead a true partnership between the disability community, Māori and Government; and help transform the disability system in line with the Enabling Good Lives (EGL) approach. Whaikaha - Ministry of Disabled People purports to do things differently to other ministries by meeting their obligations under Te Tiriti o Waitangi and the United Nations Conventions on the Rights of Persons with Disabilities. There is an acknowledgement by the Ministry of the distinct views of disabled peoples in pre-colonial Aotearoa. The Ministry aims to change the relationship between disabled people and the government to one that fosters the success of individuals and recognises that they are not people in need of being ‘fixed’.

Te Tiriti o Waitangi partnership is fundamental to the establishment of Whaikaha - Ministry of Disabled People, it is clear through its being core to the whakapapa of the organisation. The key principles which the Ministry aims to give effect to are;

- Kāwanatanga: Partnership and shared decision-making.
- Rangatiratanga: Protection, revitalisation and development of taonga.
- Rite tahi: Equity, participation and equality and non-discrimination.

== History ==
=== Background ===
On 29 October 2021, Minister for Disability Issues Carmel Sepuloni and Minister of Health Andrew Little announced that the New Zealand Government would establish a new Ministry for Disabled People within the Ministry of Social Development to reform the country's disability support system and improve outcomes for disabled people. Sepuloni justified the creation of the new ministry on the grounds that the current disability system in New Zealand had "broken down" and that consolidating these services within a single agency would improve disabled people's outcomes.

The proposed disability ministry and legislative framework were welcomed by Disability Rights Commissioner Paula Tesoriero, Te Ao Mārama chair Tristram Ingham, New Zealand Disability Support Network chief executive Peter Reynolds, and the Green Party's disability spokesperson Jan Logie. Disabled Person Assembly chief executive Prudence Walker welcomed the Government's efforts to prioritise the needs of disabled people but expressed concerns about funding and the need for disabled leadership of the new entity.

=== Launch ===
On 19 May 2022, the Government allocated NZ$108 million from the 2022 New Zealand budget to establishing the new ministry. Sepuloni stated that the new ministry would be responsible for leading and coordinating strategic disability policy across the New Zealand Government, reforming the wider disability system, and improving disabled outcomes in the areas of employment, education, health and wellbeing.

On 1 July 2022, Minister for Social Development Carmel Sepuloni and Minister for Disability Issues Poto Williams formally launched the new government department as Whaikaha - Ministry of Disabled People. During the official launch, it was confirmed that Whaikaha would be the first government department with names in the country's three official languages: English, Māori, and New Zealand Sign Language. They also confirmed that the organisation's chief executive would be a disabled person. Since the candidate was unavailable due to personal circumstances, Geraldine Woods was designated as the interim chief executive. Williams was also designated as the Minister responsible for the new organisation. Whaikaha also assumed the functions formerly delivered by the Ministry of Health's Disability Directorate. It was also tasked with reforming New Zealand's disability system in line with the Government's Enabling Good Lives (EGL) approach.

Paula Tesoriero was announced as the first chief executive of Whaikaha on 30 August 2022 and is the first disabled person to lead a New Zealand public service department.

=== 2024 respite care cutbacks ===
In March 2024, the Ministry of Disabled People abruptly announced that it would reduce respite care funding for families with disabled children. Disability Issues Minister Penny Simmonds said funding was set to run out in "days", although she first knew of funding issues back in December 2023. She said the National-led coalition government was not going to increase funding for disabled people and their families "because the Government’s coffers are not an endless open pit". On 20 March, Simmonds said Whaikaha had done an inadequate job in conveying changes to disabled people's funding. She also questioned how the money has been spent and suggested some families were wasting their funding on “massages, overseas travel and pedicures”. The changes have caused widespread anguish within the disabled community, with a petition opposing the changes attracting more than 10,000 signatures in 24 hours. In response to criticism, Minister of Finance Nicola Willis summoned Ministry officials and Simmonds for an urgent briefing, after families were blindsided by news of cuts to respite care. Willis said that news came as a surprise, and she had not been told how dire the situation was before news broke.

On 26 March 2024, Willis announced that future decisions about the Ministry's funding would go to the New Zealand Cabinet to be signed off, with the disabled community being consulted. Willis criticised the previous Labour Government for allegedly allowing the Ministry to overspend for several years. The opposition Labour Party described the new decision-making directive as a "massive vote of no confidence" in Simmonds's role as Disability Issues Minister. On 24 April 2024, Simmonds was relieved of her disability issues portfolio by Prime Minister Christopher Luxon during a cabinet reshuffle. The disability issues portfolio was assumed Minister for Social Development Louise Upston, whose Ministry has oversight over the Ministry for Disabled People.

=== 2024 spending controversy ===
In mid April 2024, disability advocate Jane Carrigan called on the Auditor-General to investigate the Ministry after it spent nearly NZ$10 million on hiring contractors and consultants. In response to Newshub's report, the Ministry said that it was a new agency and needed to hire contractors to fill temporary roles while building the organisation. Disability Issues Minister Penny Simmonds confirmed that the Government would conduct a review of disability support services in New Zealand. In late April 2024, The New Zealand Herald obtained a confidential briefing to the-then Finance Minister Grant Robertson from September 2023 detailing the Ministry's problems. Key problems included the rapid transfer of functions, responsibilities and personnel from the Ministry of Health to the new ministry, poor financial management and monitoring capabilities, ageing IT infrastructure and business practices, and workforce shortages (with 97 vacant positions in September 2023). While the Ministry for Disabled People now had a new operational model to match its mandate, its operational budget did not meet the NZ$2.2 billion needed for its operational functions.

=== Restructuring ===
On 15 August 2024, the Disabilities Issues Minister Lousie Upston announced that the Ministry would be restructured as a policy and advisory government department and that its support service delivery functions would be assumed by the Ministry of Social Development. Disabled Persons Assembly chief executive and former Green Party MP Mojo Mathers, disability advocate Blake Forbes-Gentle, CCS Disability Action national policy analyst Phoebe Eden-Mann and Green Party disability spokesperson Kahurangi Carter criticised the government's restructuring decision, saying that it would adversely affect the ability of disabled people to access support services due to MSD's poor track record of serving the disabled community.

Whaikaha became a stand-alone ministry in December 2024.
