= Shawn Cheshire =

American para cyclist

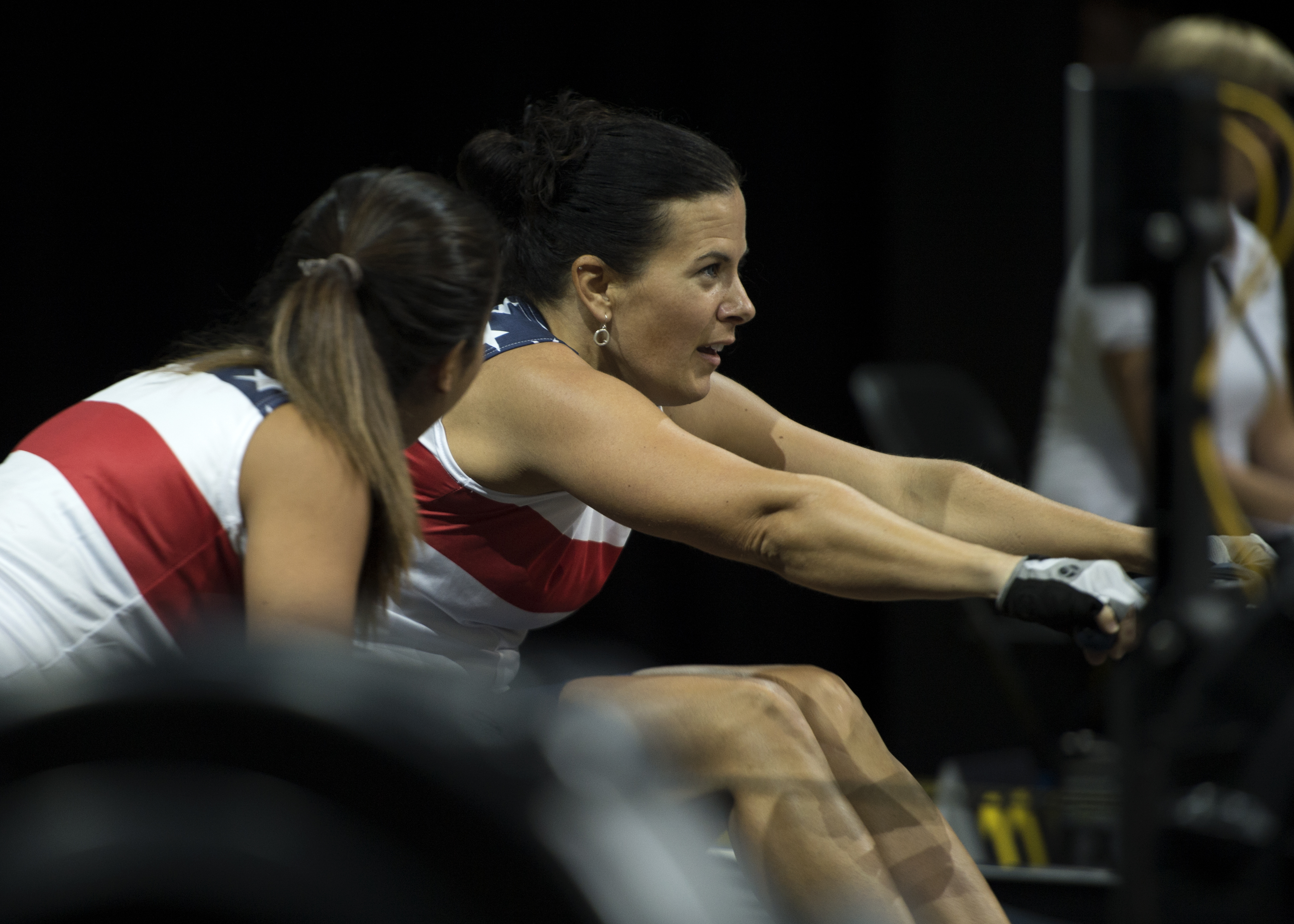
- Cheshire at 2014 Invictus Games

Personal information
- Born: September 16, 1975 (age 51) Harlingen, Texas, U.S.
- Height: 5 ft 2 in (157 cm)
- Weight: 130 lb (59 kg)

Cycling career
- Sport: Cycling
- Disciplines: Para-cycling: Road bicycle racing (Tandem), Track cycling (tandem)
- Role: Stoker
- Rider type: Para-cyclist
Medal record
Women's cycling
Representing United States
UCI Para-Cycling Road World Cup
Bronze medal – third place	2013 Road	(tandem with Jennifer Triplett
U.S. Para-Cycling National Championship
Gold medal – first place	2014 Road	(tandem with Mackenzie Woodring
Gold medal – first place	2014 TT	(tandem with Mackenzie Woodring

Shawn Cheshire (born September 16, 1975 in Harlingen, Texas) is an American para-athlete and United States Army military veteran. Cheshire has competed at the National (United States) and International levels in multiple para-sports, including adaptive rowing, adaptive biathlon, tandem road para-cycling, and tandem track para-cycling.

== Biography ==
Born in Harlingen (Texas, USA) in 1975, Cheshire joined the United States Army in 1994 serving eight years in the as a helicopter armament specialist before transitioning in 2001 to civilian career as an Emergency medical technician. Cheshire was blinded as the result of a 2009 traumatic brain injury that occurred while she was working as a paramedic in the back of an ambulance. Cheshire began tandem cycling in 2012, and was identified as an emerging talent at a 2012 United States Association of Blind Athletes (USABA) training camp. She first competed internationally in 2013, at the UCI Track Cycling World Championships. Cheshire, with tandem partner Mackenzie Woodring, were selected to represent Team USA in the Women's Tandem Time Trial and Women's Road Race events at the 2016 Summer Paralympics in Rio de Janeiro.

== Major Results – Para-Cycling ==
=== Paralympic Games ===
2016 Summer Paralympics (Rio de Janeiro, Brazil)

9th Women's Tandem Road Race. Shawn Cheshire (stoker), Mackenzie Woodring (pilot)

=== UCI Para-cycling Road World Championships ===
2017 UCI Para-cycling Road World Championships (Pietermaritzburg, South Africa)

6th, Women's Tandem Road Race. Shawn Cheshire (stoker), Tela Crane (pilot)
6th, Women's Tandem Time Trial. Shawn Cheshire (stoker), Tela Crane (pilot)

2014 UCI Para-cycling Road World Championships (Greenville, SC, USA)

10th, Women's Tandem Road Race. Shawn Cheshire (stoker), Mackenzie Woodring (pilot)
7th, Women's Tandem Time Trial. Shawn Cheshire (stoker), Mackenzie Woodring (pilot)

=== UCI Para-cycling Track World Championships ===
2017 UCI Para-cycling Track World Championships (Los Angeles, CA, USA)

5th, Women's Tandem Individual Pursuit. Shawn Cheshire (stoker), Robin Farina (pilot)
11th, Women's Tandem 1 km Time Trial. Shawn Cheshire (stoker), Robin Farina (pilot)

2016 UCI Para-cycling Track World Championships (Montichiarai, Italy)

11th, Women's Tandem 1km Time Trial. Shawn Cheshire (stoker), Mackenzie Woodring (pilot)
7th, Women's Tandem Individual Pursuit. Shawn Cheshire (stoker), Mackenzie Woodring (pilot)

=== UCI Para-cycling Road World Cup Events ===
2013 UCI Road World Cup – Segovia, Spain

3rd, Women's Tandem Road Race. Shawn Cheshire (stoker), Jennifer Triplett (pilot)
8th, Women's B Tandem Time Trial. Shawn Cheshire (stoker), Jennifer Triplett (pilot)

2013 UCI Road World Cup - Quebec, Canada

5th, Women's Tandem Road Race. Shawn Cheshire (stoker), Jennifer Triplett (pilot)

=== United States Para-Cycling National Championships ===
2014 USA Cycling Para-cycling Road National Championships – Madison, WI, USA

1st, Women's Tandem Time Trial. Shawn Cheshire (stoker), Mackenzie Woodring (pilot)
1st, Women's Tandem Road Race. Shawn Cheshire (stoker), Mackenzie Woodring (pilot)

== Major Results – Other Para-Sports ==
=== Invictus Games – Indoor Rowing ===
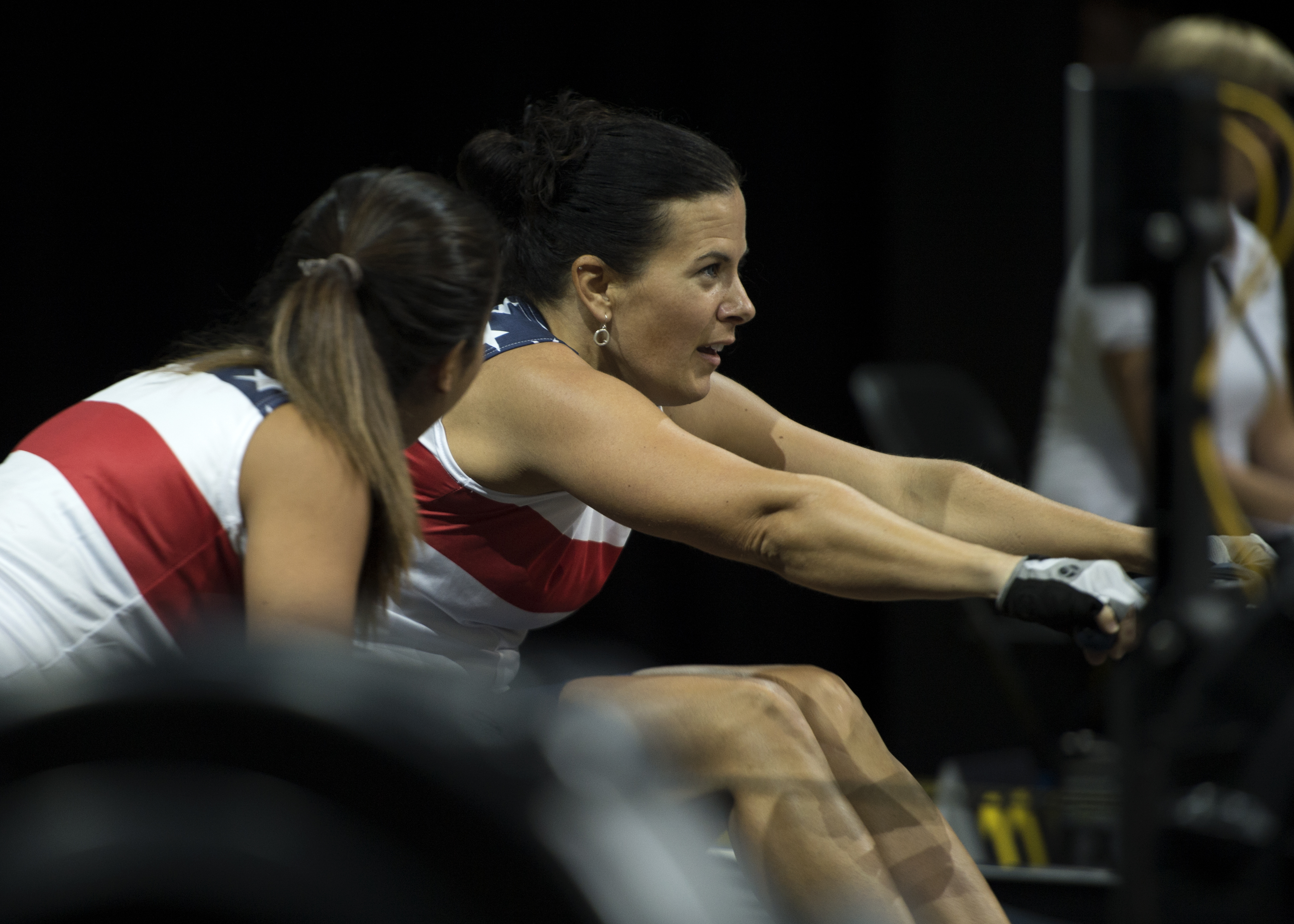
U.S. Army Spc. Shawn Cheshire, veteran, competes in indoor rowing at the 2014 Invictus Games

2014 (Inaugural) Invictus Games (London, UK)

2nd, Women's Rowing (Sprint -IR5)

=== International Paralympic Committee – Nordic Skiing ===
2013 International Paralympic Committee Nordic Skiing World Cup (Canmore, Alberta, Canada)

5th, Women's IPC Nordic Skiing World Cup

=== U.S. Cross Country Adaptive Championships – Biathlon ===
2013 U.S. Cross Country Adaptive Championships Soldier Hollow (Utah, USA)

- Biathlon
