= Robin Farina =

American cyclist (born 1977)

Personal information
- Born: September 3, 1977 (age 49) Atlanta, Georgia, U.S.
- Height: 5 ft 7 in (170 cm)
- Weight: 130 lb (59 kg)

Cycling career
- Sport: Cycling
- Current team: Retired
- Disciplines: Road cycling, Mountain bike racing, Tandem Para-cycling

Amateur teams
- 2006: DeFeet Women's Elite Team
- 2007: Target Training Women's Elite

Professional teams
- 2008: Cheerwine Women's Professional Cycling Team
- 2009: ValueAct Capital Women's Pro Cycling
- 2010: Team Vera Bradley Professional Cycling
- 2011-2013: NOW and Novartis for MS
- 2015-: BMW p/b Happy Tooth Dental

Major wins
- 2011 National Road Race Champion, Overall GC win 2008 Joe Martin Stage Race and multiple other stages and criteriums, In 2017 she won a national championship in Para Cycling by piloting a tandem on the track (with stoker Shawn Cheshire).

Robin Farina (born September 3, 1977) is a road cyclist from the United States. She made her road racing debut in 2006, transitioning from a mountain biking background. She won in 2011 the United States National Road Race Championships. She represented her country at the 2011 UCI Road World Championships and 2011 Pan American Games. With her team BMW p/b Happy Tooth Dental she participated in the team time trial at the 2015 UCI Road World Championships.

== Biography ==
In 2013, Farina and Janel Holcomb co-founded the Women's Cycling Association, a United States-based lobby group of professional cyclists and other supporters, established to create a unified voice that could raise the profile and financial viability of women's professional cycling. Farina served as Team Director of the Happy Tooth Dental Professional Racing team during the 2016 season. In 2022, Farina joined Cynisca Cycling as Director of Operations and Head of Sport. She has led the team for the last two years focusing on growing development for USA Women's cycling and driving success for young racers.

== Major results ==
=== National road cycling championships ===
2011 United States National Road Race Championships (Georgia, USA)

1st, Women's Elite Road Race

=== UCI Para-cycling Track World Championships ===
2017 UCI Para-cycling Track World Championships (Los Angeles, CA, USA)

5th, Women's Tandem Individual Pursuit. Shawn Cheshire (stoker), Robin Farina (pilot)
11th, Women's Tandem 1 km Time Trial. Shawn Cheshire (stoker), Robin Farina (pilot)

=== Cyclocross & Gravel Road Races ===
2016 Lost & Found Gravel Road Race

1st, Women's Elite

2015 Lost & Found Gravel Road Race

1st, Women's Elite
