= Launch Complex 4 =

Launch Complex 4 may refer to:

- Cytochrome c oxidase, a component of the electron transport system
- Cape Canaveral Air Force Station Launch Complex 4, one of the first series of launch complexes to be built at Cape Canaveral Air Force Station, used in the 1950s.
- Vandenberg Air Force Base Space Launch Complex 4, a launch site at Vandenberg Air Force Base, currently active.
