= Paula Tesoriero =

New Zealand Paralympic racing cyclist

Paula Tesoriero MNZM
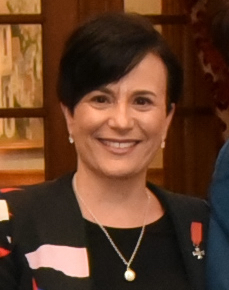
- Tesoriero in 2020

2nd Disability Rights Commissioner of New Zealand
- In office 2017–2022
- Preceded by: Paul Gibson
- Succeeded by: Prudence Walker

Personal details
- Born: 29 August 1975 (age 51) Wellington, New Zealand
- Education: Victoria University of Wellington
- Sports career
- Country: New Zealand
- Sport: Cycling
Medal record
Women's para cycling
Representing New Zealand
Paralympic Games
Gold medal – first place	2008 Beijing	500 m time trial LC3–4/CP 3
Bronze medal – third place	2008 Beijing	Individual pursuit LC 3-4/CP 3
Bronze medal – third place	2008 Beijing	Individual road time trial LC 3–4/CP 3

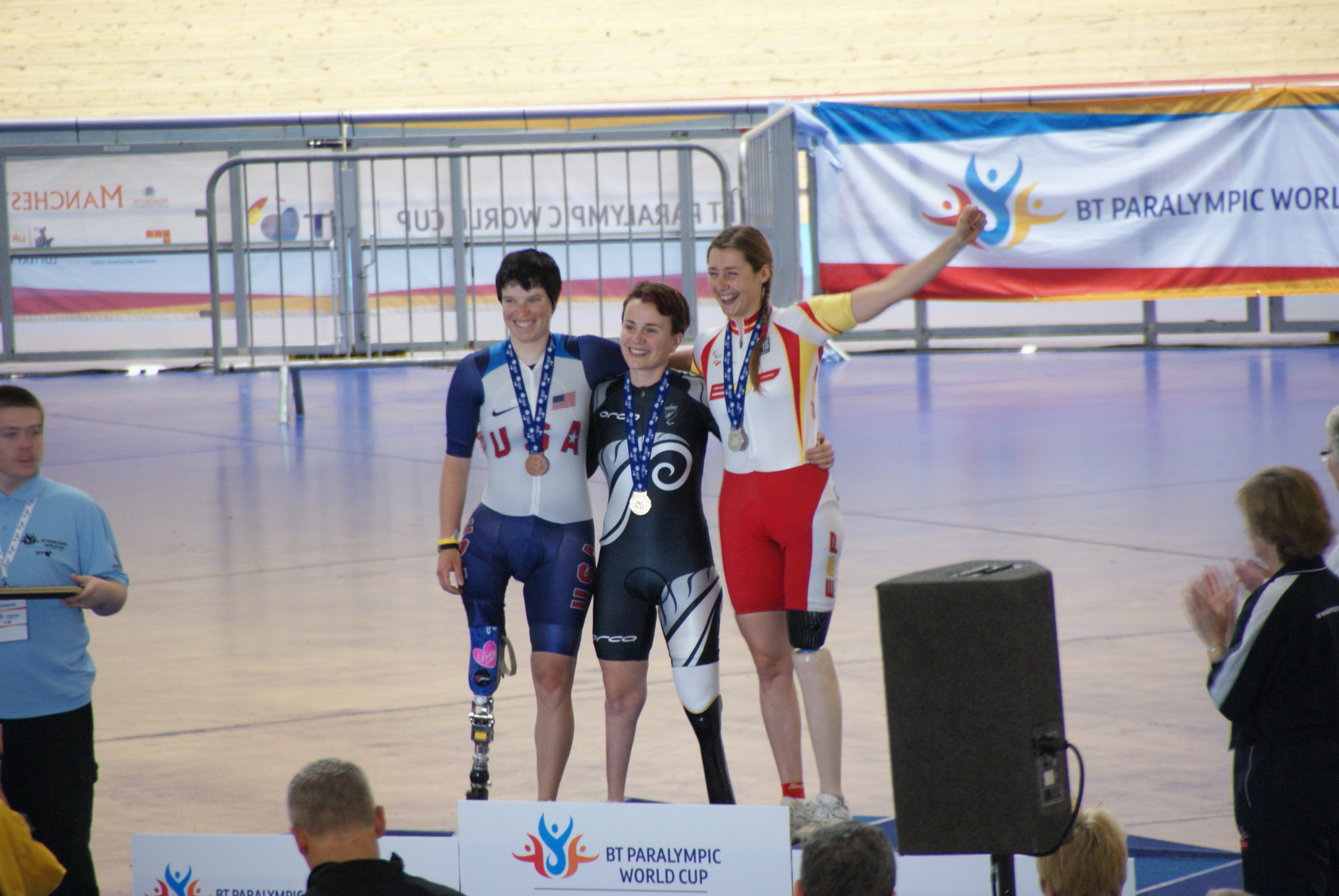
Paralympic World Cup 2009: Paula Tesoriero with Raquel Acinas and Allison Jones

Paula Margaret Tesoriero MNZM (born 29 August 1975 in Wellington) is a former New Zealand paralympics racing cyclist and senior public servant.

== Early life ==
Tesoriero was born with amniotic band syndrome, which caused mobility issues. She got her first bicycle when she was five and used it as a way to "keep up with everyone." Her left leg was amputated below the knee when she was thirteen. Tesoriero uses an artificial left leg and is missing an ankle on her right leg. When she competes, she uses a carbon limb on her left leg.

Tesoriero graduated from Victoria University of Wellington with a Bachelor of Arts in 1998, a Bachelor of Laws in 2000 and a Post Graduate Diploma in Public Management in 2009.

== Cycling career ==
Tesoriero is classified as a LC3 athlete. She competed for New Zealand in the 2008 Summer Paralympics. Her world record-breaking time in the women's 500m time trial secured New Zealand's first gold medal at that games, and she later went on to win bronze in both the individual pursuit, and the women's individual road time trial. She broke the world record earlier in the year and also won two silver medals at the 2006 UCI Track Cycling World Championships. Tesoriero also competed in the bicycle road race.

Tesoriero was made a Member of the New Zealand Order of Merit in the 2009 New Year Honours, for her services to cycling. She has been a member of the Sports Tribunal of New Zealand since 2015 and has also been on the boards of the New Zealand Artificial Limb Service, the Halberg Disability Sport Foundation and Paralympics NZ.

She was chef de mission for New Zealand at the 2020 Summer Paralympics.

== Public service career ==
Tesoriero worked as a senior legal adviser and manager at the Ministry of Justice from 2002 to 2016, finishing as General Manager, Higher Courts. She was General Manager, System and Partnerships at Statistics New Zealand from 2016 to 2017.

She was appointed Disability Rights Commissioner at the New Zealand Human Rights Commission in June 2017. After completing her first three-year term, she was reappointed for a further five years. During her appointment, she was Acting Chief Human Rights Commissioner from 2018 to 2019. As Disability Rights Commissioner, Tesoriero initiated an inquiry into support of disabled people during the Omicron outbreak of COVID-19 in March 2022.

She was announced as the first chief executive of Whaikaha - Ministry of Disabled People on 30 August 2022 and is the first disabled person to lead a New Zealand public service department.
