= LC4 (classification) =

Para-cycling classification

LC4 is a para-cycling classification.

== Definition ==
In 2000, BBC Sport defined this classification as "LC4 for riders with disabilities affecting both legs. " In 2008, BBC Sport defined this classification was "LC4: Riders with disabilities affecting both legs " In 2008, the Australian Broadcasting Corporation defined this classification was "Locomotor Disabilities (LC): Cyclists with a physical disability compete in four classes - LC1, LC2, LC3, LC4 - based on functional ability, with separate events for men and women.". The Australian Paralympic Education Program defined this classification in 2012 as: "Riders with disabilities affecting both legs "

== Historical world records ==
Below are some historical world records for this classification in the 200m men's Indoor track / Flying start.

Time	Cyclist	Country	Classification	Date and location	Country location	Reference
17"000	Maurice Chevrot	FRA	LC 4 Bicycle	01.06.1994 GENT	BEL
16"980	Alaric Pritchard	GBR	LC 4 Bicycle	17.08.2004 NEWPORT, WALES	GBR
15"780	Michael Teuber	GER	LC 4 Bicycle	08.05.2005 AUGSBURG	GER

== Classification history ==
Cycling first became a Paralympic sport at the 1988 Summer Paralympics. In September 2006, governance for para-cycling passed from the International Paralympic Committee's International Cycling Committee to UCI at a meeting in Switzerland. When this happened, the responsibility of classifying the sport also changed.

For the 2016 Summer Paralympics in Rio, the International Paralympic Committee had a zero classification at the Games policy. This policy was put into place in 2014, with the goal of avoiding last minute changes in classes that would negatively impact athlete training preparations. All competitors needed to be internationally classified with their classification status confirmed prior to the Games, with exceptions to this policy being dealt with on a case-by-case basis.

== Becoming classified ==
Classification is handled by Union Cycliste Internationale.

== See also ==
- Para-cycling classification
- Cycling at the Summer Paralympics
