= LC3 (classification) =

Para-cycling classification

LC3 is a para-cycling classification for riders with a handicap in one lower limb who will usually pedal with one leg only.

== Definition ==
In 2000, BBC Sport defined this classification as "LC3 - essentially for riders with a handicap in one lower limb who will usually pedal with one leg only," In 2008, BBC Sport defined this classification was "LC3: Riders with impairment in one lower limb who will usually pedal with one leg only" In 2008, the Australian Broadcasting Corporation defined this classification was "Locomotor Disabilities (LC): Cyclists with a physical disability compete in four classes — LC1, LC2, LC3, LC4 - based on functional ability, with separate events for men and women.". The Australian Paralympic Education Program defined this classification in 2012 as: "Riders with impairment in one lower limb who will usually pedal with one leg only"

== Classification history ==
Cycling first became a Paralympic sport at the 1988 Summer Paralympics. In September 2006, governance for para-cycling passed from the International Paralympic Committee's International Cycling Committee to UCI at a meeting in Switzerland. When this happened, the responsibility of classifying the sport also changed.

For the 2016 Summer Paralympics in Rio, the International Paralympic Committee had a zero classification at the Games policy. This policy was put into place in 2014, with the goal of avoiding last minute changes in classes that would negatively impact athlete training preparations. All competitors needed to be internationally classified with their classification status confirmed prior to the Games, with exceptions to this policy being dealt with on a case-by-case basis.

== Events ==
Events for this classification include the Individual Pursuit and the 1 km Time Trial.

== Historical world records ==
Below are some historical world records for this classification in the 200m men's Indoor track / Flying start.

Time	Cyclist	Country	Classification	Date and location	Country location	Reference
15"040	Miguel Angel Perez	ESP	LC 3 Bicycle	02.06.1994 GENT	BEL
14"550	Norbert Zettler	AUT	LC 3 Bicycle	03.08.1995 AUGSBURG	GER
13"332	Matthew Plested	GBR	LC 3 Bicycle	23.08.2003 NCC MANCHESTER	GBR

== Competitors ==
LC3 competitors include Simon Richardson from Great Britain who has won multiple gold medals. Another competitor in this class includes Australia's Chris Scott.

== Becoming classified ==
Classification is handled by Union Cycliste Internationale.

== See also ==
- Para-cycling classification
- Cycling at the Summer Paralympics
