= Natalie Simanowski =

German cyclist (born 1978)

Personal information
- Born: 20 July 1978 (age 48) Lingen, Lower Saxony, West Germany

Sport
- Sport: Paralympic cycling
- Disability: Spinal cord injury
- Disability class: LC3
Medal record
Paralympic cycling
Representing Germany
Paralympic Games
Silver medal – second place	2008 Beijing	500m time trial LC3-4
Silver medal – second place	2008 Beijing	Individual pursuit LC3-4
World Road Championships
Gold medal – first place	2006 Aigle	Time trial LC3-4, CP3
Gold medal – first place	2007 Bordeaux	Time trial LC3-4
Silver medal – second place	2007 Bordeaux	Road race LC3/4
Bronze medal – third place	2006 Aigle	Road race LC3/4, CP3
World Track Championships
Gold medal – first place	2006 Aigle	Road time trial LC3-4, CP3
Gold medal – first place	2006 Aigle	Road time trial LC3
Gold medal – first place	2007 Bordeaux	Individual pursuit LC3
Bronze medal – third place	2007 Bordeaux	500m time trial LC3

Natalie Simanowski (born 20 July 1978) is a German retired Paralympic cyclist who competed at international elite competitions. She is a triple world champion in cycling and a double Paralympic silver medalist. Simanowski was a former middle-distance runner.

== Early life ==
She was born in 1978 in Lingen in Germany. She became a middle-distance athlete competing as a national level marathon runner and she became a paediatric nurse.

== Stabbing incident ==
On 25 June 2003, Simanowski had finished work at a hospital outpatient department in Munich and she ran to her car to put her work documents in the boot of her car. As she opened the boot, she was attacked by someone described as "a psychopath" who stabbed her twice in the spinal cord between her eleventh and twelfth thoracic vertebrae and narrowly missed her left lung with a butcher's knife. This caused her to have an incomplete spinal cord injury.

The perpetrator of the knife attack was caught by the police three days later. He was diagnosed with schizophrenic psychosis as a result of drug abuse and had voices in his head telling him to kill a woman which was his motive for the attack on Simanowski. When questioned by police, the attacker said that after the incident he went back to an apartment in the city centre and went to sleep.

Simanowski had a damaged spine and she lost the feeling in her lower limbs. She spent two years in hospital.

== Cycling ==
After she got in contact with Adelbert Kromer, who was the national coach, she took up cycling and was soon training two hours each day. Simanowski refers to this change in her routine as her "second life".

In 2006 she was cycling at the 2006 IPC Cycling World Championships where she contested the time-trial and the road-race. She won the 16.8 km women's time trial Women for the LC3-4 – CP3 classification, beating Barbara Buchan of the US.

In 2007 the German Disabled Sports Association recognised her achievement and announced that she and Mathias Mester were the Disabled Athletes of the Year.

Simanowski is a triple World champion in cycling. She is a double Paralympic silver medallist at the 2008 Summer Paralympics in Beijing where she gained the medals in the time trail and the individual pursuit.

She published her biography, Wieder Aufstehen, that she wrote with assistance in 2009.
