= HCB (classification) =

Para-cycling classification

HCB is a para-cycling classification.

== Definition ==
In 2008, BBC Sport defined this classification was "HCB: For athletes with complete loss of lower limb function and limited trunk stability" In 2008, the Australian Broadcasting Corporation defined this classification was "Handcycling (HC): Cyclists in handcycling race on bikes with two big wheels at either end — they sit in the middle and use a hand pump rather than pedals to propel themselves forward. These competitors usually require a wheelchair for mobility or are unable to use normal bikes or tricycles because of severe lower limb disability." The Australian Paralympic Education Program defined this classification in 2012 as: "For athletes with complete loss of lower limb function and limited trunk stability"

== Classification history ==
Cycling first became a Paralympic sport at the 1988 Summer Paralympics. In September 2006, governance for para-cycling passed from the International Paralympic Committee's International Cycling Committee to UCI at a meeting in Switzerland. When this happened, the responsibility of classifying the sport also changed.

For the 2016 Summer Paralympics in Rio, the International Paralympic Committee had a zero classification at the Games policy. This policy was put into place in 2014, with the goal of avoiding last minute changes in classes that would negatively impact athlete training preparations. All competitors needed to be internationally classified with their classification status confirmed prior to the Games, with exceptions to this policy being dealt with on a case-by-case basis.

== Competitors ==
Competitors in this class include Australia's Mel Leckie.

== Becoming classified ==
Classification is handled by Union Cycliste Internationale.

== See also ==
- Para-cycling classification
- Cycling at the Summer Paralympics
