= Ellen Hunter =

Welsh racing cyclist

Ellen Hunter OBE
Personal information
- Full name: Ellen Hunter
- Born: 12 February 1968 (age 58) Wrexham, Wales

Cycling career
- Sport: Cycling
- Discipline: Tandem
- Role: Pilot for visually impaired
- Rider type: Sprint

Amateur team
- Yasumitsu-Schlapp
Medal record
Representing Great Britain
Women's track cycling
Paralympic Games
Gold medal – first place	2008 Beijing	Kilo (B&VI)
Gold medal – first place	2008 Beijing	Individual Pursuit
Gold medal – first place	2004 Athens	Kilo (B&VI)
Silver medal – second place	2004 Athens	Individual Sprint

Ellen Hunter OBE (born 12 February 1968, Wrexham) is a Welsh competitive cyclist and tandem pilot for Aileen McGlynn at Paralympic events.

Hunter and McGlynn broke the flying 200m women's tandem World record in April 2004.

Hunter met her husband Paul through cycling, and both were selected to ride as pilots for visually impaired cyclists at the 2004 Paralympic Games in Athens, as part of the British Cycling team.

At the 2004 Athens Paralympics, McGlynn and Hunter won gold in the women's time trial B-13 and silver in the Individual sprint.

At the 2006 IPC Track Cycling World Championships in Aigle, Switzerland, Ellen Hunter piloted Aileen McGlynn to win gold in the Tamdem Kilo (VI), setting a world record of 1:10.795 in the process and winning a Rainbow Jersey for Wales, they ranked 17th among 33 male competitors.

She broke her back in a cycling accident at the Women's Omnium at Herne Hill Velodrome, and was told she may never cycle again, she spent six weeks in hospital.

Hunter and McGlynn, coached by Barney Storey, once again broke the World Record at the 2008 UCI Track Cycling World Championships in Manchester, in a time of 1:10.381, but despite this, failed to gain a podium position.

The pair represented Great Britain at the 2008 Beijing Paralympics, winning gold in the Kilo (B&VI 1–3), setting a new world record time of 1:09.066 in the process, and in the individual pursuit (B&VI 1–3).

Hunter lives with her husband and two children in Penryn, Cornwall.

Hunter was appointed Officer of the Order of the British Empire (OBE) in the 2009 New Year Honours for services to disabled sport.

== Palmarès ==
2004
1st Women's Tandem Kilo (B 1-3), 2004 Summer Paralympics
2nd Women's Tandem Sprint (B 1-3), 2004 Summer Paralympics

2006
1st Tandem sprint, VISA Paralympic World Cup (B/VI female)
4th British National Tandem Sprint Championships (with Joby Ingram-Dodd)

2007
1st Tandem sprint, VISA Paralympic World Cup (B/VI female)
