= Claire McLean =

Australian Paralympic cyclist and paratriathlete

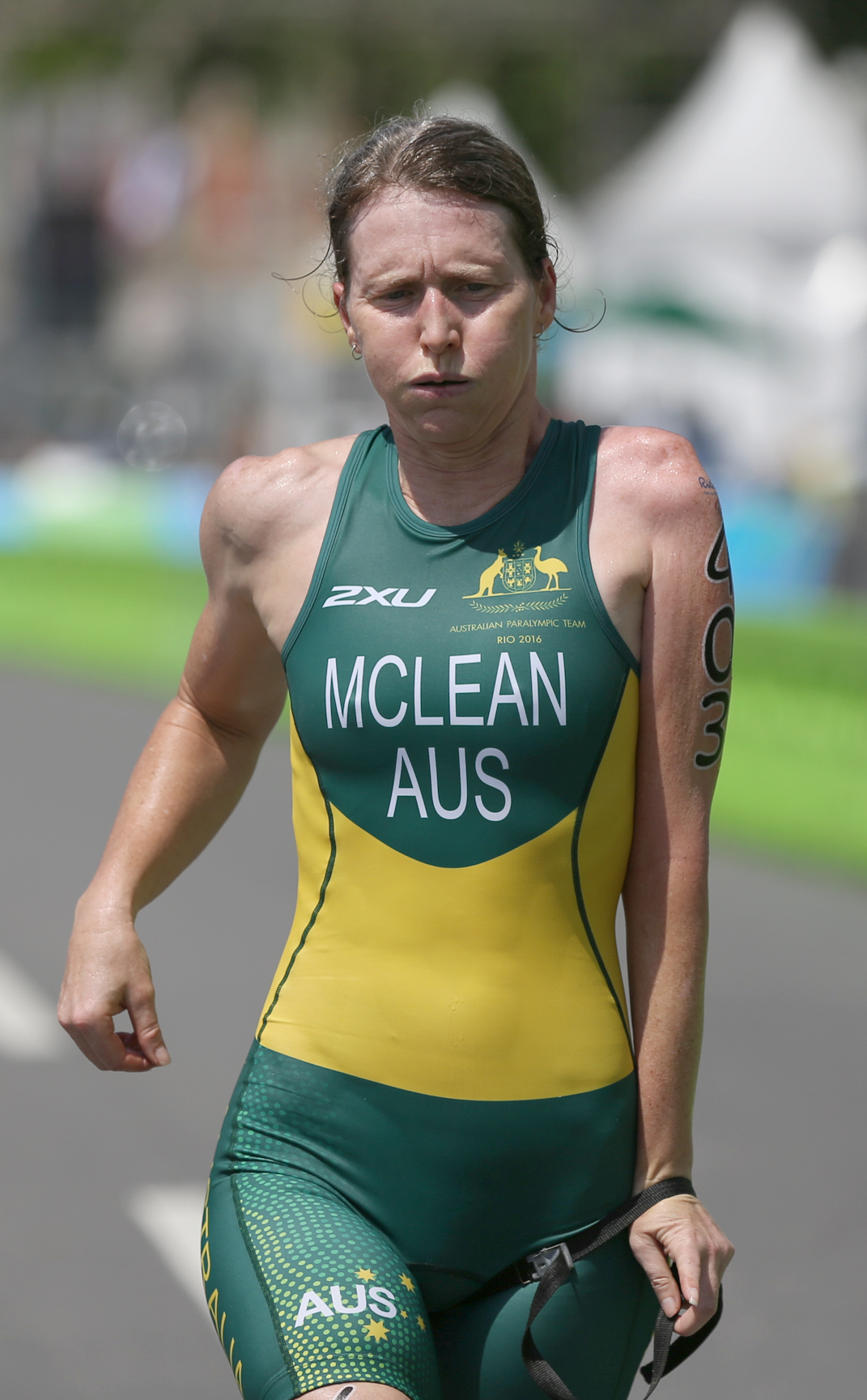
- 2016 Rio Paralympic Games - Triathlon

Personal information
- Nationality: Australia
- Born: 4 July 1973 (age 52) Cottesloe, Western Australia
Medal record
Women's para-cycling
Paralympic Games
Silver medal – second place	2004 Athens	Women's Bicycle Time Trial LC1-4/CP 3/4
Track World Championships
Silver medal – second place	2006 Aigle	Individual Pursuit LC1
Bronze medal – third place	2007 Bordeaux	Individual Pursuit LC1
Road World Championships
Bronze medal – third place	2009 Bogogno	Women's Road Time Trial LC1
Bronze medal – third place	2009 Bogogno	Women's Road Race LC1
Women's paratriathlon
World Championships
Bronze medal – third place	2012 Auckland	TRI 4
Oceania Championships
Gold medal – first place	2015 Penrith	PT4

Claire McLean (born 4 July 1973) is an Australian Paralympic cyclist and paratriathlete. She represented Australia at the 2016 Rio Paralympics when paratriathlon made its debut at the Paralympics.

== Career ==
McLean was born in Cottesloe, Western Australia in 1973. She damaged her arm in a motor cycle accident when she was nineteen.

She won a silver medal at the 2004 Athens Games in the Women's Bicycle Time Trial LC1-4/CP 3/4 event. She has since won several Paracycling World Championship and World Cup medals in the C5 classification.

As a TRI-4 (arm impaired) paratriathlete, she placed 3rd in her first International paratriathlon race, the 2012 ITU Paratriathlon World Championships. At the 2014 ITU World Triathlon Series Final in Edmonton, Canada, she finished seventh in the Women's PT4. In January 2015, McLean won the Oceania Paratriathlon Championships PT4 event at Penrith, New South Wales. McLean finished eighth at the 2015 World Triathlon Series Women's P4 Final in Chicago.

McLean failed to be selected for the 2012 Summer Paralympics in London and decided to switch to the new triathlete sport. She did represent Australia at the 2016 Rio Paralympics when paratriathlon made its debut at the Paralympics.

McLean finished ninth in PT4 at the 2016 Rio Paralympics Games. In reflection on her performance throughout the Paralympics McLean says "Without that big goal I feel a little bit lost. I think everyone needs to have something to aim towards, to seek some sort of personal improvement, whether it’s physically, spiritually, psychologically or just being a good person on a day to day basis. It’s what keeps me going."
