= Laoshan Velodrome =

Sports venue in Beijing, China

Coordinates: 39°54′46.78″N 116°12′26.65″E

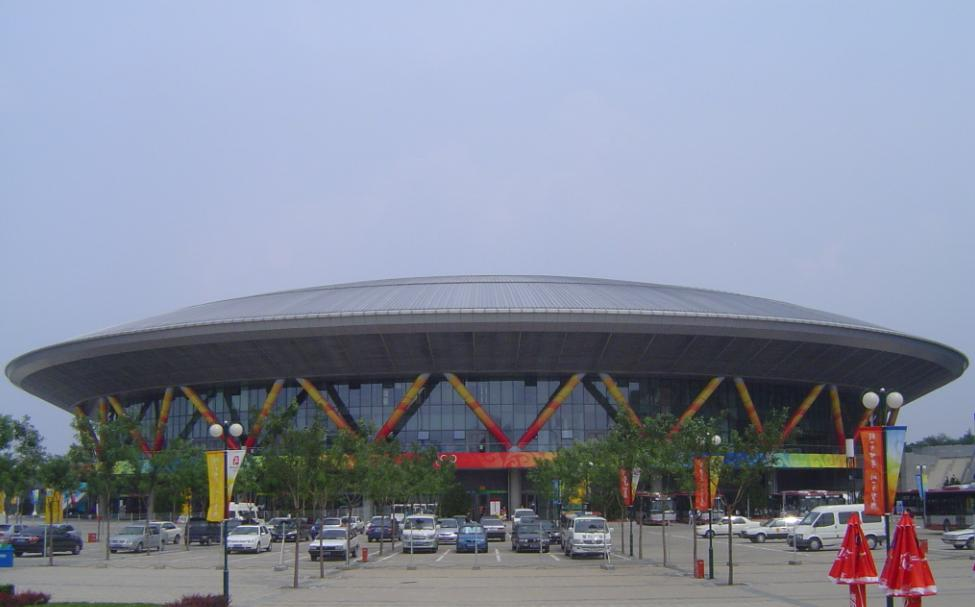
The Laoshan Velodrome

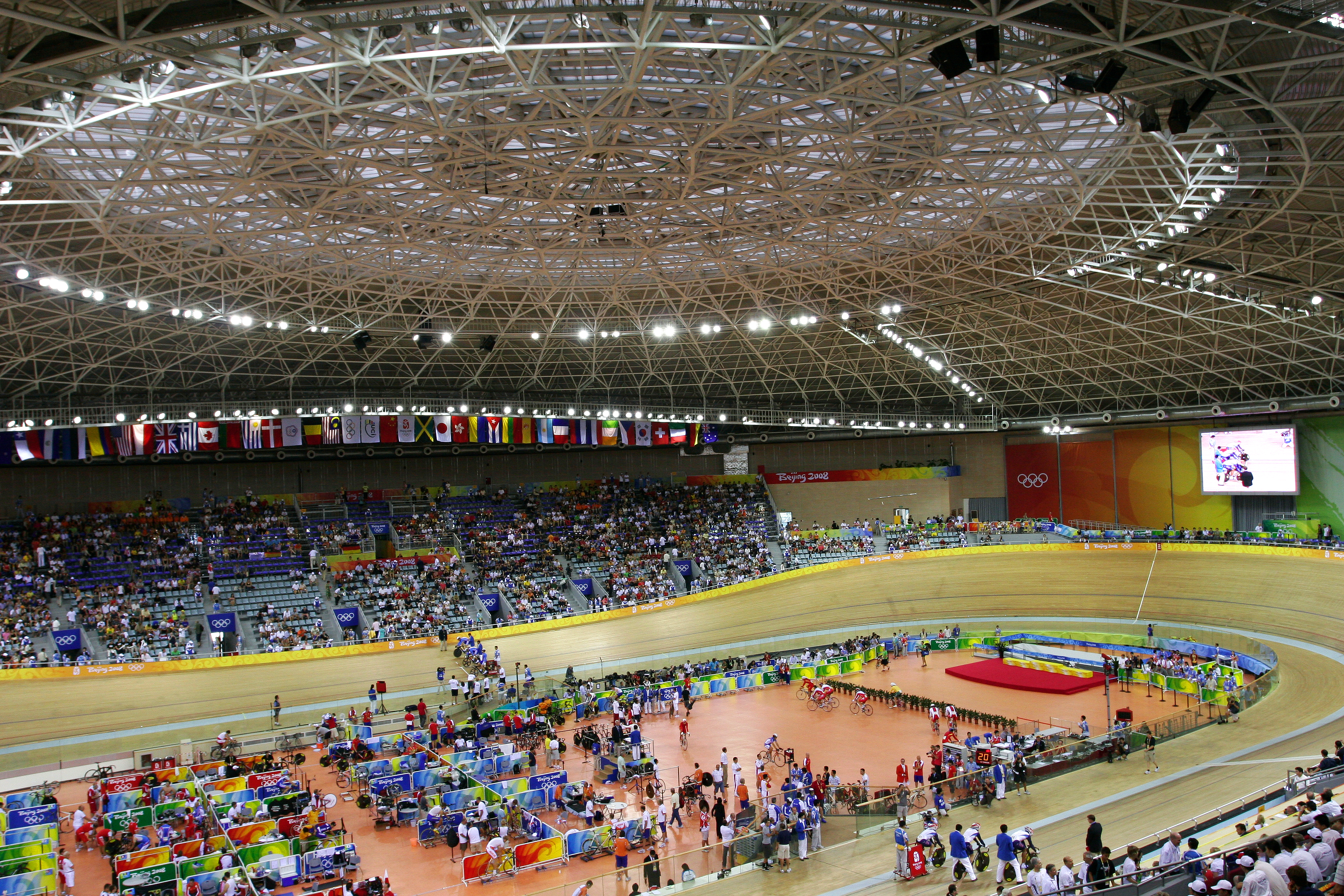
Interior during the 2008 Summer Olympics

The Laoshan Velodrome (Chinese: 老山自行车馆; pinyin: Lǎoshān Zìxíngchēguǎn) is a velodrome that is located in Laoshan, Shijingshan District, Beijing, China. It was built for the 2008 Summer Olympics. The venue was tested during the UCI Track World Cup in December 2007.

The velodrome hosted track cycling disciplines during the Olympics. It has a capacity of 6,000 spectators, a 250-metre oval shaped track, and a total land surface of 32,920 square metres.

The Laoshan Velodrome will be used for international and national cycling competitions and training after the Olympic Games. The seating capacity may be reduced to 3,500.

The velodrome was designed by Schuermann Architects, designers of the ADT Event Center in Carson, CA and the UCI Cycling Center in Aigle, Switzerland.

== See also ==
- List of cycling tracks and velodromes
