= Jayme Richardson =

Australian Paralympic cyclist

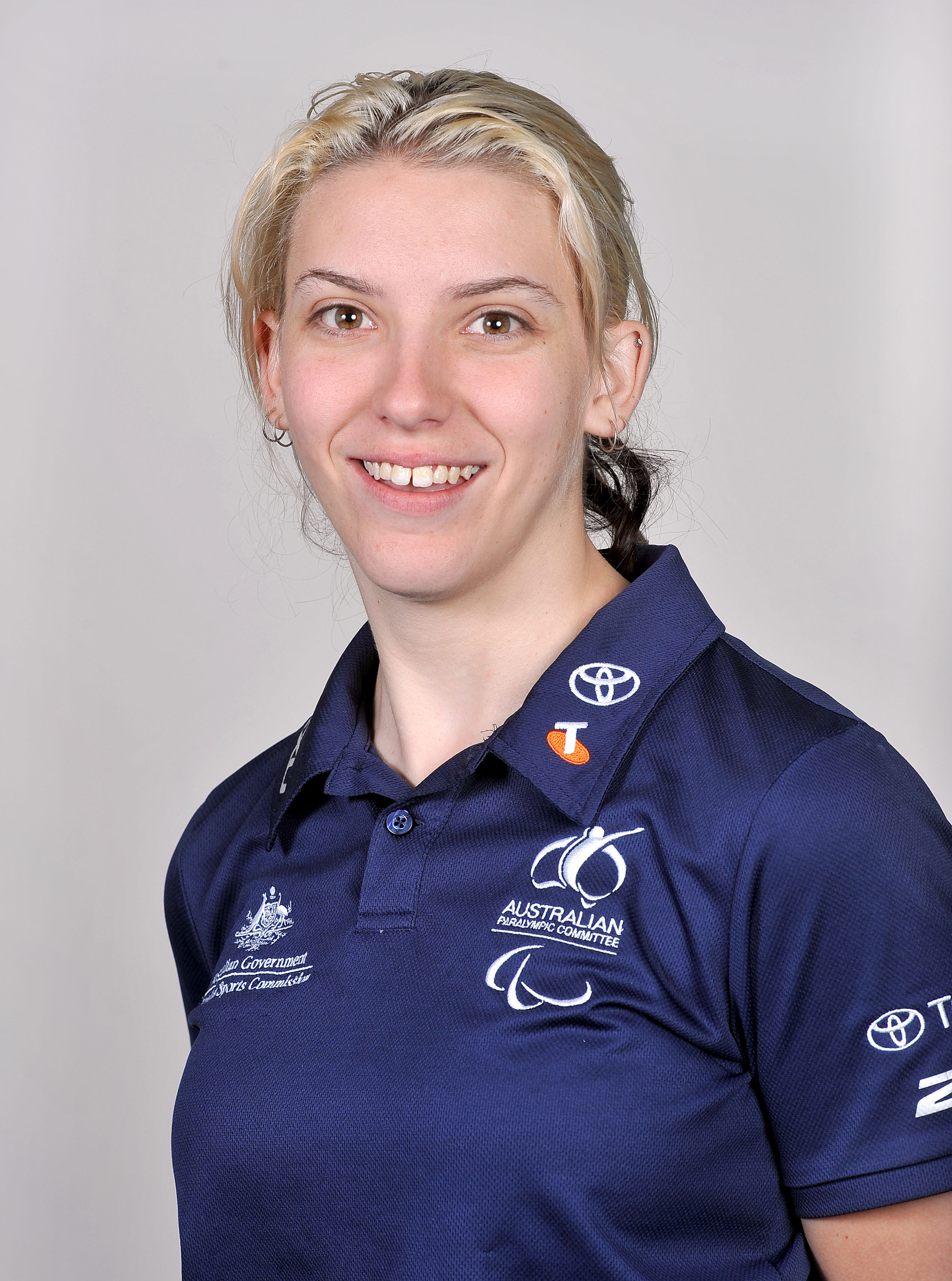
- 2012 Australian Paralympic team portrait of Jayme Richardson

Personal information
- Nationality: Australian
- Born: Jayme Paris; 27 April 1989 (age 37) Blacktown, New South Wales, Australia

Sport
- Country: Australia
- Sport: Para cycling
Medal record
Paralympic Games
Bronze medal – third place	2008 Beijing	Women's 500 m Time Trial LC3-4/CP3
Bronze medal – third place	2012 London	Women's 500 m Time Trial C1–3
UCI Para-cycling Track World Championships
Gold medal – first place	2014 Aguascalientes	Women's 3 km Individual Pursuit C1
Gold medal – first place	2014 Aguascalientes	Women's 500 m time trial C1
Silver medal – second place	2009 Manchester	Women's 500 m time trial LC3/LC4/CP3
UCI Para-cycling Road World Championships
Gold medal – first place	2014 Greenville	Women's Time Trial C1

Jayme Richardson (née Paris, born 27 April 1989) is an Australian Paralympic cyclist. She was born in the Sydney suburb of Blacktown with cerebellar ataxia due to asphyxiation at birth. She began cycling in October 2004 after seeing a post Athens Paralympic interview with Silver Medalist Claire McLean where Claire said Australia needed more female Para-cyclists. At the time Jayme was a swimmer and was doing very well, having competed both through school to CHS Level and out of school to National Level, however she felt that there was something greater out there for her and decided that a change was needed.

She won a bronze medal at the 2008 Beijing Games in the Women's 500 m Time Trial LC3-4/CP3 event. At the 2012 London Paralympics, she won a bronze medal in the 500 m Time Trial C1–3, and also participated in the Women's Road Race C1–3, Women's Time Trial C1–3, Women's Individual Pursuit C1–3 and Women's 500 m Time Trial C1–3.

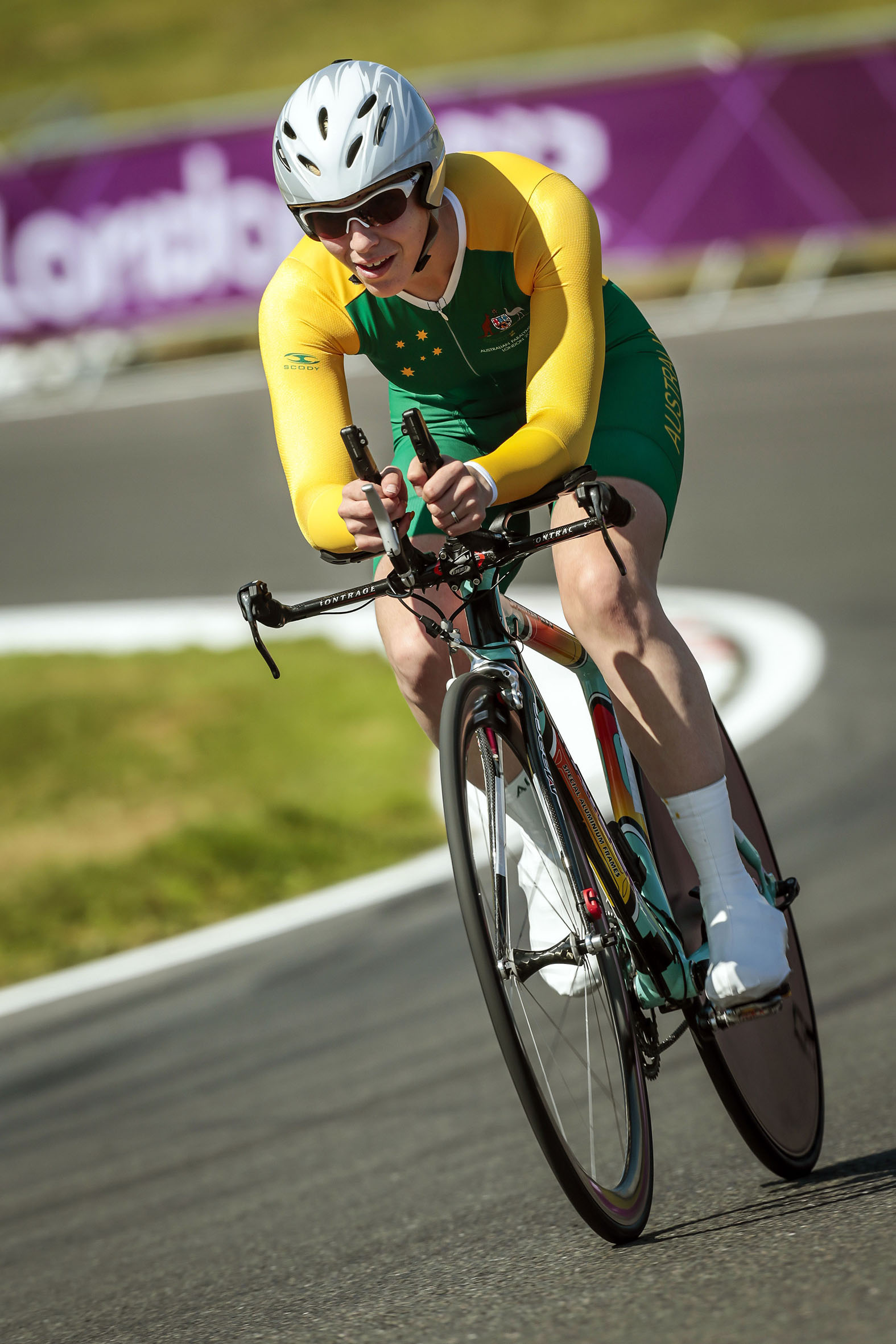
Paros at the 2012 London Paralympics

At the 2014 UCI Para-cycling Track World Championships in Aguascalientes, Mexico, she won gold medals in the Women's 3 km Individual Pursuit C1 and Women's 500 m Time Trial C1. Competing at the 2014 UCI Para-cycling Road World Championships in Greenville, South Carolina, Richardson won the Women’s Time Trial C1.

== Recognition ==
In 2014, Richardson was named the Australian Paralympic Committee Elite Para-cycling Female Athlete of the Year.
