= Raquel Acinas =

Spanish cyclist (born 1978)

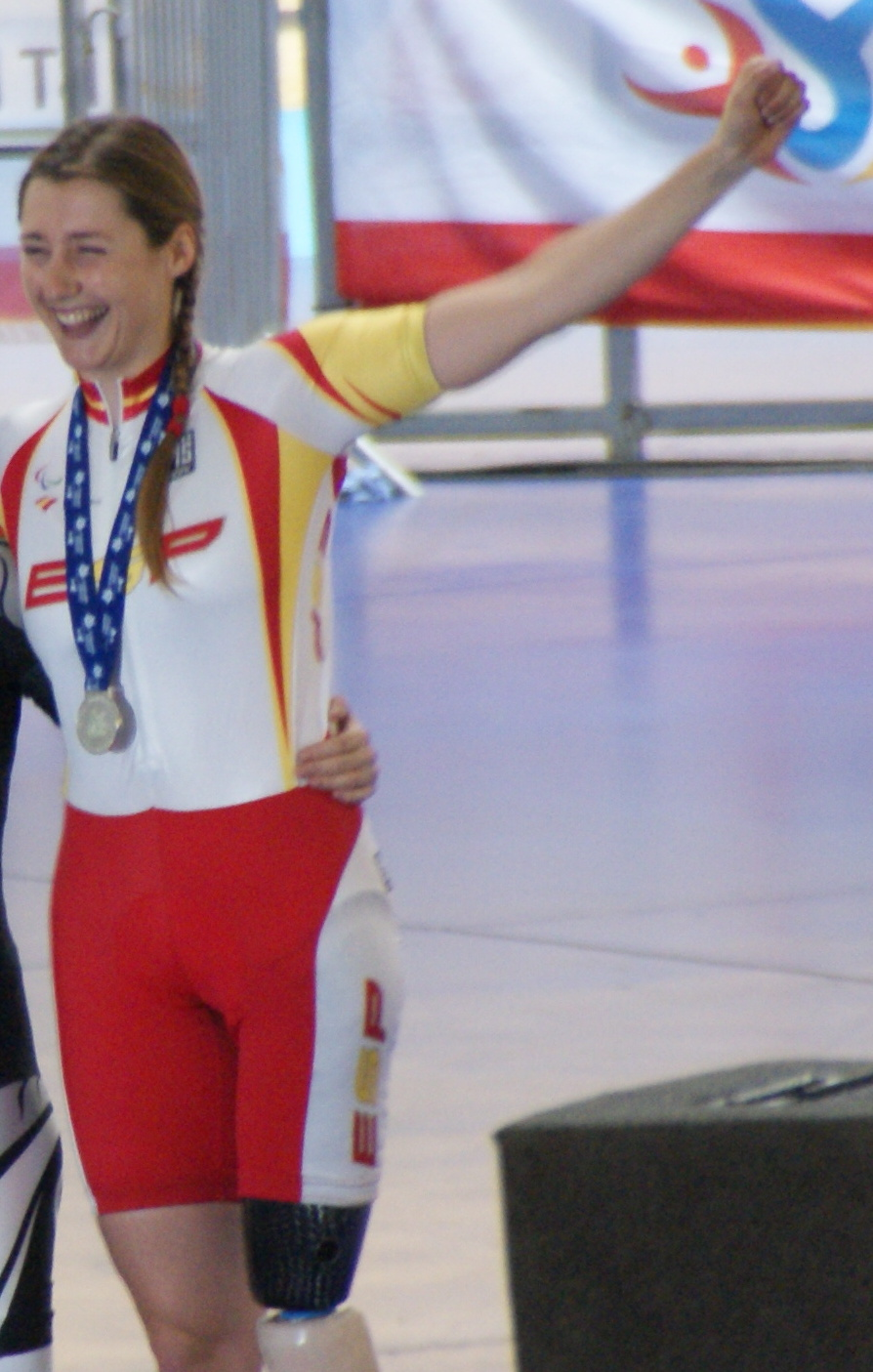
- Paula Tesoriero, Raquel Acinas Poncelas and Allison Jones

Personal information
- Full name: Raquel Acinas Poncelas
- Nationality: Spanish
- Born: 12 April 1978 (age 48) L'Hospitalet, Barcelona, Spain

Sport
- Country: Spain
- Sport: Cycling

Raquel Acinas Poncelas (born 12 April 1978 in L'Hospitalet) is a Spanish cyclist who has represented Spain at the 2008 and 2012 Summer Paralympics in both road and track events. She also competed at the 2013 World Championships.

== Personal ==
Acinas was born in L'Hospitalet, Catalan town of Spain, near Barcelona city. She has a degree in architecture and works in the field as a technical architect.

On 1 August 2004, Acinas was 26 years old, she had a femoral amputation her left leg following an accident in which an SUV rammed into her motorcycle. In 2011, she was one of several people featured in a documentary titled La Teoría del Espiralismo whose creation was sponsored by the Fundación Cultural Banest and which was promoted by the Spanish Paralympic Committee.

== Cycling ==
Acinas is a C2 classified cyclist, and cycles while having only one leg. Prior to her accident, Acinas occasionally went to the gym and trained with her brother, and also rode mountain bikes from time to time. A year and a half after her accident, she got on her bicycle and soon after, she went to Velòdrom d'Horta where she met a number of people who encouraged her in the sport, including her eventual coach, Bernat Moreno.

Acinas competed at the 2008 Summer Paralympics in both the track and road events.

Typical training in the lead up to the London Paralympics depended on the season. During the winter, Acinas did two one-hour sessions a week of swimming in the morning. In the afternoon, she would train several hours either doing weights or training on the velodrome until about 9:00 pm. AS the games got closer, she did three hour morning sessions training on the road, and then would do three hour sessions in the afternoon on the track. In between training sessions, she would go into work. She qualified for the London Paralympics after earning a pair of gold medals at a World Cup event in Segovia. She competed at the 2012 Summer Paralympics. She was one of four competitors at the 2012 Games from L'Hospitalet. In the 48-kilometre-long (30 mi) road race, she finished fifth with a time of 1:39.51. She also competed in events held at the velodrome, finishing seventh in one of the chase events. From the Catalan region of Spain, she was a recipient of a 2012 Plan ADOP scholarship. She lost her scholarship following the London Games, and had to cut back on training because she needed to work. Baie-Comeau, Quebec, Canada hosted the 2013 Para-cycling World Championships, and she competed in them.
