= Ana María López Calleja =

Spanish Paralympic athlete

Personal information
- Born: 30 November 1968 (age 57) Madrid, Spain

Sport
- Country: Spain
- Sport: Paralympic athletics Paralympic cycling
- Disability class: B2
Medal record
Paralympic athletics
Representing Spain
Paralympic Games
Bronze medal – third place	1992 Barcelona	Women's long jump B2

Ana María López Calleja (born 30 November 1968) is a retired Spanish Paralympic athlete who competed in 100 metres and long jump events at the 1992 Summer Paralympics winning a bronze medal in the long jump. She later went on to participate in cycling at the 2008 Summer Paralympics but did not medal in her events.
