= Mackenzie Woodring =

American cyclist

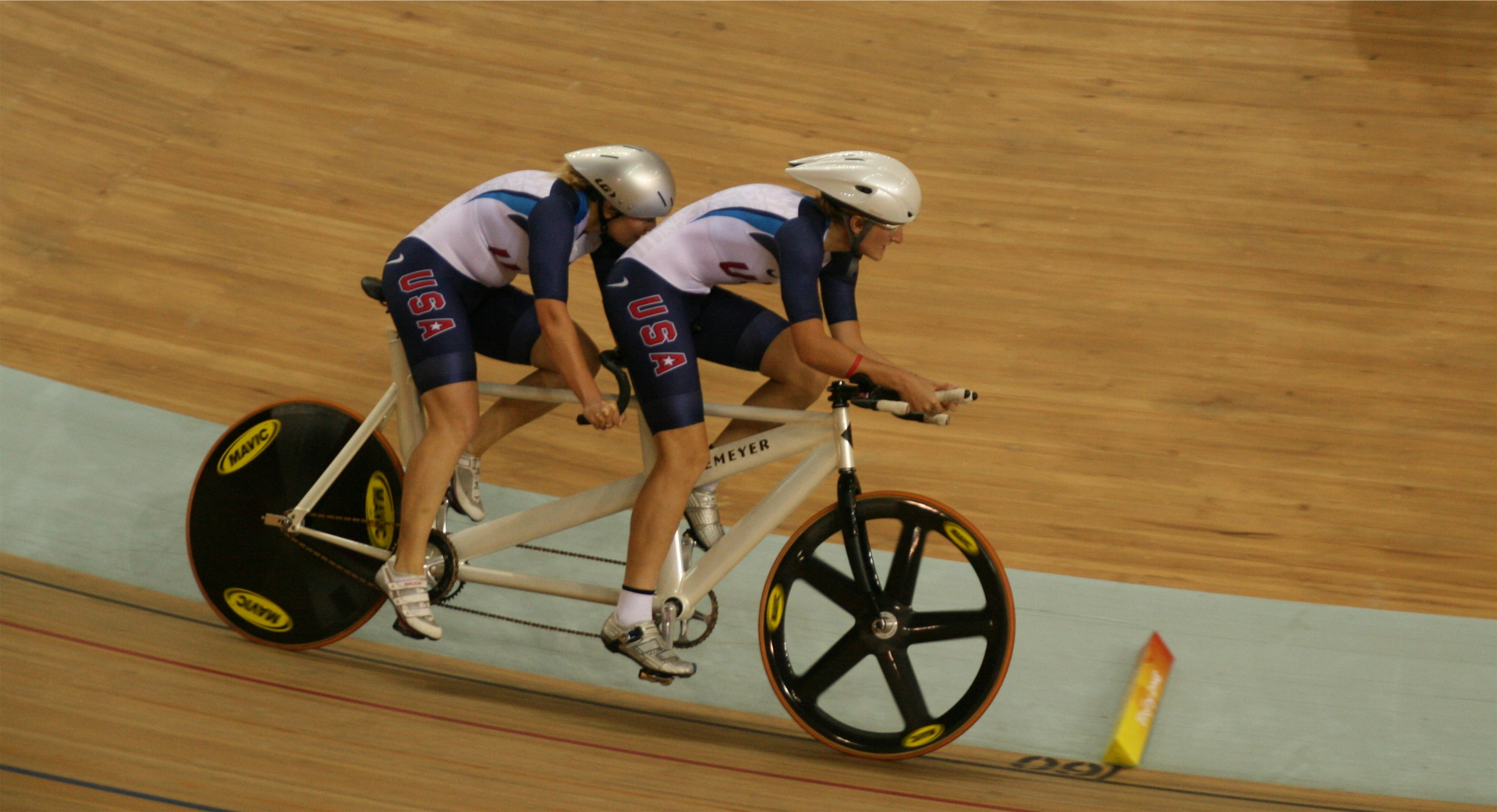
- 2008 Summer Paralympics, Tandem. Karissa Whitsell and Mackenzie Woodring (pilot) compete in Beijing Summer Paralympics on September 07, 2008

Personal information
- Born: Michigan, United States
Medal record
Women's cycling
Representing United States
Paralympic Games
Gold medal – first place	2008 Beijing	Ind TT (tandem with Karissa Whitsell)
Gold medal – first place	2008 Beijing	Ind Pursuit (tandem with Karissa Whitsell)
Silver medal – second place	2008 Beijing	Road (tandem with Karissa Whitsell)
UCI Para-cycling Track World Championships
Gold medal – first place	2009 England	3K pursuit (tandem with Karissa Whitsell
Silver medal – second place	2009 England	1K time trial (tandem with Karissa Whitsell

Mackenzie Woodring is an American cyclist who won a gold medal at the 2008 Summer Paralympics in Beijing, China. Woodring was selected for the 2015 UCI Para-cycling Road World Championships (Team USA) and 2016 Summer Paralympics (tandem paracycling, with stoker Shawn Cheshire).

== Biography ==
Woodring's cycling career started with an introduction to recreational riding in 2004, then progressed quickly. Woodring was recruited to the Colavita/Sutter Home professional cycling team for the 2008 season after riding with Jamaican Olympian Iona Wynter Park and U.S. criterium champion Tina Pic during a warmup for the 2007 Tour de Leelanau.
