= Annaliisa Farrell =

New Zealand racing cyclist

Personal information
- Born: 23 January 1966 (age 60) Tokanui, New Zealand
Medal record
Women's para track cycling
Representing New Zealand
Paralympic Games
Bronze medal – third place	2008 Beijing	Time trial B&VI 1–3

Annaliisa Farrell (born 23 January 1966, in Tokanui) is a New Zealand paralympic cyclist and pilot, who won a bronze medal at the 2008 Summer Paralympics along with tandem partner Jayne Parsons in the Women's Time trial.
