= Jayne Parsons =

New Zealand Paralympic cyclist

Personal information
- Born: 18 March 1962 (age 64) Lower Hutt, New Zealand
Medal record
Women's para track cycling
Representing New Zealand
Paralympic Games
Bronze medal – third place	2008 Beijing	Time trial B&VI 1–3
World Championships
Bronze medal – third place	2011 Montichiari	Time trial

Jayne Parsons (born 18 March 1962 in Lower Hutt) is a New Zealand paralympic cyclist who won a bronze medal at the 2008 Summer Paralympics along with tandem partner Annaliisa Farrell in the Women's Time trial. Parsons has visual impairments.

In 2011, Parsons was named as NEXT Woman of the Year in the Sport category.
