= Barbara Buchan =

American cyclist (born 1956)

Personal information
- Born: 1955 or 1956 (age 70–71)
- Education: Boise State University ('78)
Medal record
Representing United States
Paralympic Games
Women's para cycling
Gold medal – first place	2008 Beijing	Time trial LC 3–4/CP 3
Gold medal – first place	2008 Beijing	Indiv. pursuit (LC 3–4/CP 3)
Women's para athletics
Silver medal – second place	1988 Seoul	800 m C8

Barbara Buchan (born 1956) is an American cyclist who won two gold medals at the 2008 Summer Paralympics in Beijing, China.

Buchan originally was a track and field competitor. She was also considered a top U.S. cyclist until a road race accident in 1982 shattered her skull, placing her into a coma for two months and causing permanent brain injuries. Following surgeries and rehabilitation, she returned to the track at the 1988 Summer Paralympics in Seoul, winning a silver in the 800m. Buchan cycled against men at the 2000 Paralympics in Sydney, finishing two races at 9th and 10th. She competed at the 2004 games in Athens when women's cycling was first included in the Paralympics.

== Personal life ==
Buchan was raised in Mountain Home, Idaho. In 1974 she graduated from Mountain Home High School and in 1978 she earned a bachelor's degree in athletic training/teaching from Boise State University.
