= Karissa Whitsell =

American cyclist

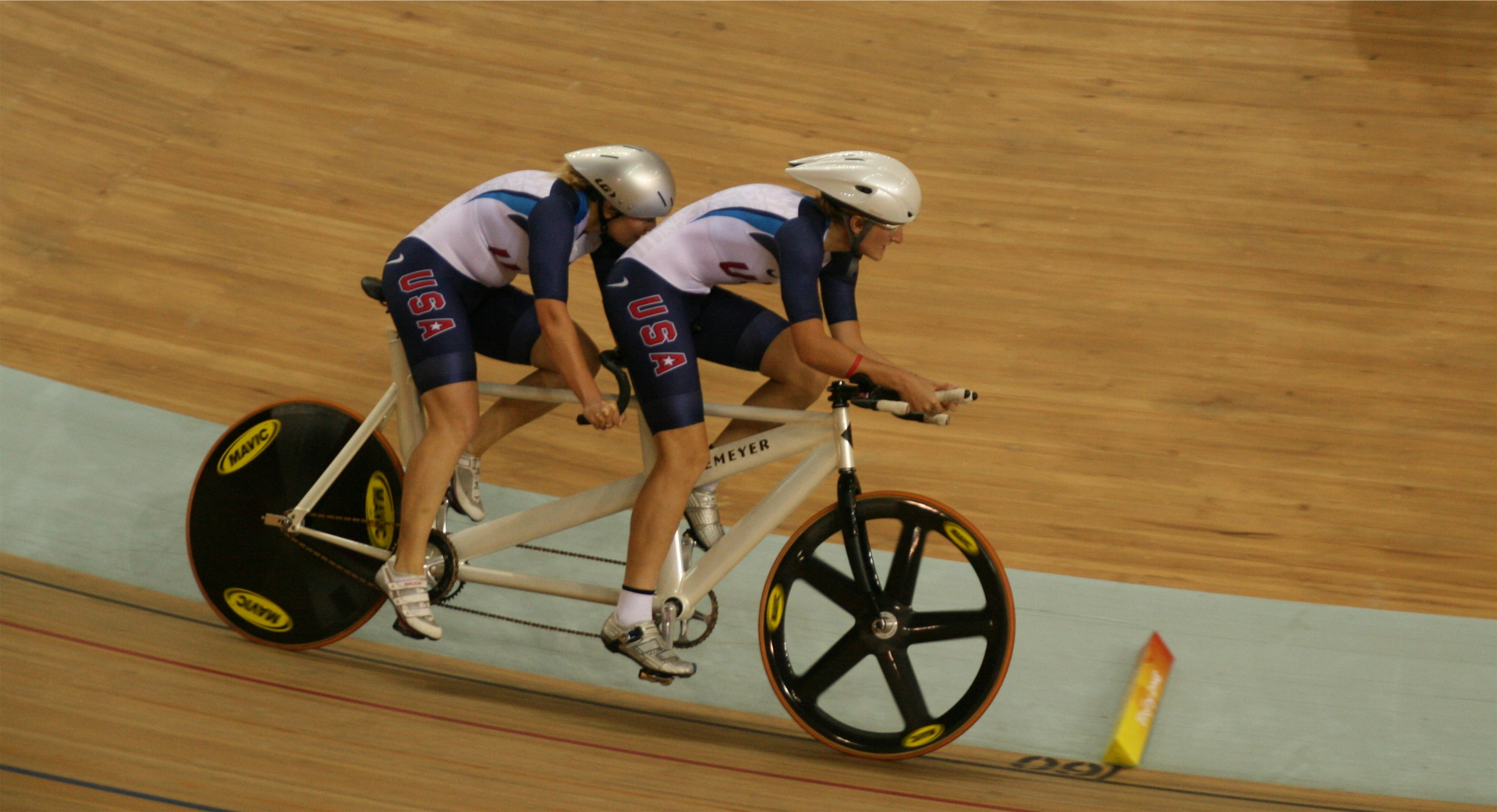
- 2008 Summer Paralympics, Tandem. Karissa Whitsell and Mackenzie Woodring (pilot) compete in Beijing Summer Paralympics on September 7, 2008

Personal information
- Born: June 15, 1981 (age 45) Eugene, Oregon, United States

Cycling career
- Sport: Cycling
- Discipline: Track
- Role: Rider
Medal record
Women's cycling
Representing United States
Paralympic Games
Gold medal – first place	2004 Athens	road race/time trial
Gold medal – first place	2004 Athens	3 km individual pursuit
Gold medal – first place	2008 Beijing	time trial B&VI 1-3
Silver medal – second place	2004 Athens	1 km time trial
Silver medal – second place	2008 Beijing	road race B&VI 1-3
Bronze medal – third place	2004 Athens	sprint
Bronze medal – third place	2008 Beijing	individual pursuit B&VI 1-3
Parapan American Games
Silver medal – second place	2011 Guadalajara	Mixed time trial B
Silver medal – second place	2011 Guadalajara	Road race B
Silver medal – second place	2011 Guadalajara	1km time trial B
Silver medal – second place	2011 Guadalajara	Individual pursuit B

Karissa Whitsell (born June 15, 1981) is an accomplished American blind cyclist. Whitsell, with her tandem partner Katie Compton, won four medals at the 2004 ΧΙΙ Paralympic Games in Athens, Greece. They won a gold medal in the road race/time trial event, another gold in the 3 km individual pursuit, a silver in the 1 km time trial, and a bronze in the sprint.

Whitsell won a gold medal in the time trial, a silver medal in the road race, and a bronze medal in the individual pursuit event in the 2008 Summer Paralympics in Beijing.
