= Italy at the 2012 Summer Paralympics =

- IPC code: ITA
- NPC: Comitato Italiano Paralimpico
- Website: www.comitatoparalimpico.it (in Italian)

in London
- Competitors: 98 in 12 sports
- Flag bearers: Oscar De Pellegrin (gold) (opening); Alex Zanardi (gold) (gold) (silver) (closing)
- Medals Ranked 13th: Gold 9 Silver 8 Bronze 11 Total 28

Summer Paralympics appearances (overview)
- 1960; 1964; 1968; 1972; 1976; 1980; 1984; 1988; 1992; 1996; 2000; 2004; 2008; 2012; 2016; 2020; 2024

Italy competed at the 2012 Summer Paralympics in London, United Kingdom, from 29 August to 9 September 2012.

== Medalists ==
Medal	Name	Sport	Event	Date
Gold	Cecilia Camellini	Swimming	Women's 100 metre freestyle S11	31 August
Gold	Cecilia Camellini	Swimming	Women's 50 metre freestyle S11	1 September
Gold	Oscar De Pellegrin	Archery	Men's individual recurve W1/W2	3 September
Gold	Assunta Legnante	Athletics	Women's shot put F11-12	5 September
Gold	Alex Zanardi	Cycling	Men's time trial H4	5 September
Gold	Martina Caironi	Athletics	Women's 100 metre T42	5 September
Gold	Roberto Bargna	Cycling	Men's road race C1-3	6 September
Gold	Alex Zanardi	Cycling	Men's road race H4	7 September
Gold	Ivano Pizzi; Luca Pizzi (pilot)	Cycling	Men's road race B	8 September
Silver	Oxana Corso	Athletics	Women's 200 metre T35	31 August
Silver	Pamela Pezzutto	Table tennis	Women's individual - Class 1-2	2 September
Silver	Alvise De Vidi	Athletics	Men's 100 metre T51	3 September
Silver	Elisabetta Mijno	Archery	Women's individual recurve W1/W2	4 September
Silver	Ivano Pizzi; Luca Pizzi (pilot)	Cycling	Men's time trial B	5 September
Silver	Oxana Corso	Athletics	Women's 100 metre T35	7 September
Silver	Giorgio Farroni	Cycling	Mixed road race	8 September
Silver	Francesca Fenocchio; Vittorio Podestà; Alex Zanardi	Cycling	Mixed H1-4 team relay	8 September
Bronze	Federico Morlacchi	Swimming	Men's 100 metre butterfly S9	30 August
Bronze	Cecilia Camellini	Swimming	100 metre backstroke SM11	2 September
Bronze	Federico Morlacchi	Swimming	Men's 100 metre freestyle S9	4 September
Bronze	Annalisa Minetti; Andrea Giocondi (guide)	Athletics	Women's 1500 metre T12	4 September
Bronze	Vittorio Podestà	Cycling	Men's time trial H2	5 September
Bronze	Matteo Betti	Wheelchair fencing	Men's épée A	5 September
Bronze	Michele Pittacolo	Cycling	Men's road race C4-5	6 September
Bronze	Federico Morlacchi	Swimming	Men's 200 metre medley SM9	6 September
Bronze	Alessio Sarri	Wheelchair fencing	Men's sabre B	6 September
Bronze	Cecilia Camellini	Swimming	400 m freestyle S11	7 September
Bronze	Vittorio Podestà	Cycling	Men's road race H2	7 September

Medals by sport
Sport	Gold medal	Silver medal	Bronze medal	Total
Cycling	4	3	3	10
Athletics	2	3	1	6
Swimming	2	0	5	7
Archery	1	1	0	2
Table tennis	0	1	0	1
Wheelchair fencing	0	0	2	2
Total	9	8	11	28

Medals by date
Day	Date	Gold medal	Silver medal	Bronze medal	Total
1	30 August	0	0	1	1
2	31 August	1	1	0	2
3	1 September	1	0	0	1
4	2 September	0	1	1	2
5	3 September	1	1	0	2
6	4 September	0	1	2	3
7	5 September	3	1	2	6
8	6 September	1	0	3	4
9	7 September	1	1	2	4
10	8 September	1	2	0	3
11	9 September	0	0	0	0
Total		9	8	11	28

Multiple medalists
Name	Sport	Gold medal	Silver medal	Bronze medal	Total
Alex Zanardi	Cycling	2	1	0	3
Cecilia Camellini	Swimming	2	0	2	4
Ivano Pizzi; Luca Pizzi (pilot)	Cycling	1	1	0	2
Oxana Corso	Athletics	0	2	0	2
Vittorio Podestà	Cycling	0	1	2	3
Federico Morlacchi	Swimming	0	0	3	3

== Archery ==
Men

Athlete	Event	Ranking round		Round of 32	Round of 16	Quarterfinals	Semifinals	Finals	
Athlete	Event	Score	Seed	Opposition score	Opposition score	Opposition score	Opposition score	Opposition score	Rank
Giampaolo Cancelli	Ind. compound open	630	21	Kallunki (FIN) (12); W 6–0	Simonelli (ITA) (5); L 2–6	Did not advance			
Alberto Simoncelli	Ind. compound open	659	5	Sener (TUR) (28); W 6–4	Cancelli (ITA) (21); W 6–2	Rodriguez (ESP) (13); L 4–6	Did not advance		
Fabio Azzolini	Ind. compound W1	612	8	—N/a	Ferrandi (ITA) (9); W 6–5	Drahoninsky (CZE) (1); L 5–6	Did not advance		
Gabriele Ferrandi	Ind. compound W1	590	9	—N/a	Azzolini (ITA) (8); L 5–6	Did not advance			
Vittorio Bartoli	Ind. recurve W1/W2	579	15	Chopyk (UKR) (18); L 2–6	Did not advance				
Oscar De Pellegrin	Ind. recurve W1/W2	625	4	Bye	Wolfe (USA) (20); W 6–0	Lee (KOR) (5); W 6–4	Tseng (TPE) (1); W 7–3	Sanawi (MAS) (19); W 6–5	1st place, gold medalist(s)
Mario Esposito	Ind. recurve standing	574	22	Bennett (USA) (11); L 2–6	Did not advance				
Vittorio Bartoli; Oscar De Pellegrin; Mario Esposito	Men's team recurve	1778	6	—N/a	Bye	China (CHN) (3); L 185–194	Did not advance		

Women

Athlete	Event	Ranking round		Round of 32	Round of 16	Quarterfinals	Semifinals	Finals	
Athlete	Event	Score	Seed	Opposition score	Opposition score	Opposition score	Opposition score	Opposition score	Rank
Veronica Floreno	Ind. recurve W1/W2	517	12	Bye	Ko (KOR) (5); W 6–2	Bayar (TUR) (13); W 6–2	Nemati (IRI) (1); L 0–6	Li (CHN) (11); L 4–6	4
Elisabetta Mijno	Ind. recurve W1/W2	588	2	Bye	Kuncova (CZE) (15); W 7–3	Kalay (TUR) (7); W 6–2	Li (CHN) (11); W 6–4	Nemati (IRI) (1); L 3–7	2nd place, silver medalist(s)
Mariangela Perna	Ind. recurve W1/W2	480	16	Droste (GER) (17); W 6–0	Nemati (IRI) (1); L 0–6	Did not advance			
Veronica Floreno; Elisabetta Mijno; Mariangela Perna	Women's team recurve	1585	4	—N/a		Turkey (TUR) (5); W 183–175	China (CHN) (1); L 187–192	Iran (IRI) (2); L 184–188	4

== Athletics ==
=== Men's track ===
Athlete	Events	Heat		Final	
Athlete	Events	Time	Rank	Time	Rank
Andrea Cionna	Marathon T12	—N/a		2:43:59	10
Riccardo Scendoni	100 m T44	12.45	6	Did not advance	
Riccardo Scendoni	200 m T44	24.51	4	Did not advance	
Riccardo Scendoni	400 m T44	55.88	4	Did not advance	
Davide dalla Palma	800 m T46	2:02.24	8	Did not advance	
Davide dalla Palma	1500 m T46	4:03.58	7 q	4:02.26	10
Alessandro Di Lello	Marathon T46	—N/a		2:46:27	8
Walter Endrizzi	Marathon T46	—N/a		2:39:32	5
Alvise De Vidi	100 m T51	—N/a		22.60	2nd place, silver medalist(s)

=== Women's track ===
Athlete	Events	Heat		Semifinal		Final	
Athlete	Events	Time	Rank	Time	Rank	Time	Rank
Elisabetta Stefanini; Massimo di Marcello (guide)	100 m T12	13.20	3 q	13.36	4	Did not advance	
Elisabetta Stefanini; Massimo di Marcello (guide)	200 m T12	27.14	3	—N/a		Did not advance	
Elisabetta Stefanini; Massimo di Marcello (guide)	400 m T12	1:02.57	1 Q	1:02.03	3	Did not advance	
Annalisa Minetti; Andrea Giocondi (guide)	1500 m T12	—N/a				4:48.88 WR	3rd place, bronze medalist(s)
Oxana Corso	100 m T35	—N/a				15.95 EU	2nd place, silver medalist(s)
Oxana Corso	200 m T35	—N/a				33.68 EU	2nd place, silver medalist(s)
Martina Caironi	100 m T42	—N/a				15.87 WR	1st place, gold medalist(s)

=== Women's field ===
Athlete	Events	Mark	Points	Rank
Assunta Legnante	Discus F11-12	30.81m	799	8
Assunta Legnante	Shot put F11-12	16.74m WR	1011	1st place, gold medalist(s)
Martina Caironi	Long jump F42-44	3.50m	—N/a	13

== Cycling ==
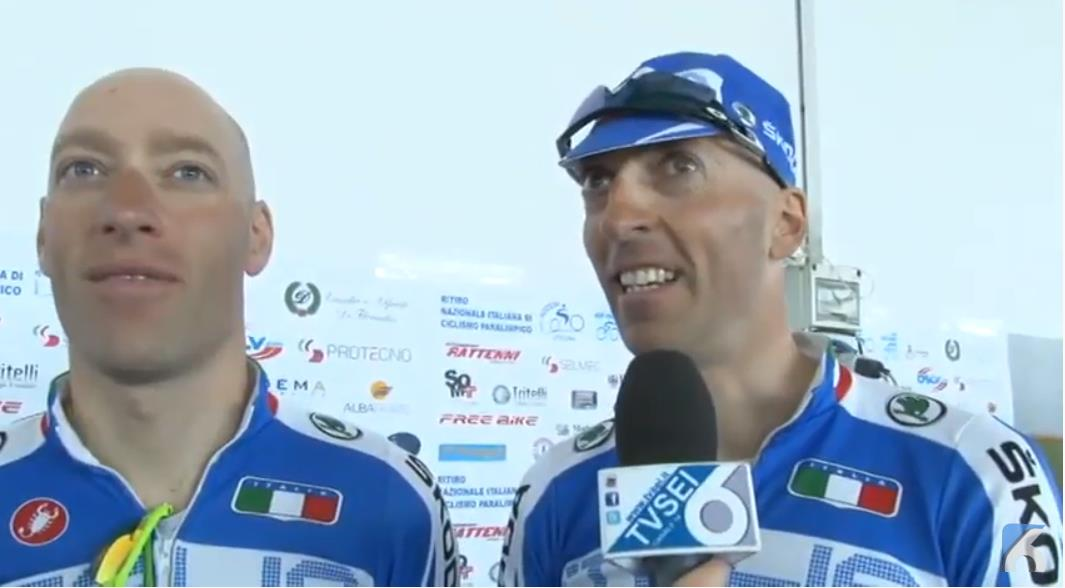
Luca Pizzi (guide, left) and his brother Ivano (right), two medals at this edition.

=== Track ===
Athlete	Event	Qualification		Finals	
Athlete	Event	Time	Rank	Time	Rank
Andrea Tarlao	Men's 1km time trial C4–5	—N/a		1:10.175	9
Andrea Tarlao	Men's individual pursuit C5	4:44.120	5	Did not qualify	
Roberto Bargna; Andrea Tarlao; Paolo Vigano	Mixed team sprint	57.095	9	Did not qualify	

=== Road – road race ===
Athlete	Event	Time	Rank
Paolo Cecchetto	Men's road race H2	1:43:51	7
Vittorio Podestà	Men's road race H2	1:38:02	3rd place, bronze medalist(s)
Mauro Cratassa	Men's road race H3	DNF	
Alessandro Zanardi	Men's road race H4	2:00:32	1st place, gold medalist(s)
Roberto Bargna	Men's road race C1-3	1:42:51	1st place, gold medalist(s)
Paolo Vigano	Men's road race C1-3	1:42:51	4
Michele Pittacolo	Men's road race C4-5	1:55:51	3rd place, bronze medalist(s)
Andrea Tarlao	Men's road race C4-5	1:56:06	10
Ivano Pizzi; Luca Pizzi (pilot)	Men's road race B	2:26:52	1st place, gold medalist(s)
Francesca Fenocchio	Women's road race H1-3	1:55:10	7
Claudia Schluer	Women's road race H1-3	2:02:15	9
Giorgio Farroni	Mixed road race T1-2	45:24	2nd place, silver medalist(s)
Francesca Fenocchio; Vittorio Podestà; Alessandro Zanardi	Mixed H1-4 team relay	30:50.00	2nd place, silver medalist(s)

=== Road – time trial ===
Athlete	Event	Time	Rank
Paolo Cecchetto	Men's time trial H2	32:48.48	12
Vittorio Podestà	Men's time trial H2	27:01.98	3rd place, bronze medalist(s)
Mauro Cratassa	Men's time trial H3	28:36.65	7
Alessandro Zanardi	Men's time trial H4	24:50.22	1st place, gold medalist(s)
Roberto Bargna	Men's time trial C3	24:34.39	5
Paolo Vigano	Men's time trial C3	26:05.59	13
Andrea Tarlao	Men's time trial C5	33:15.94	4
Ivano Pizzi; Luca Pizzi (pilot)	Men's time trial B	30:50.41	2nd place, silver medalist(s)
Francesca Fenocchio	Women's time trial H1-2	35:35.46	4
Claudia Schluer	Women's time trial H1-2	37:23.61	6
Giorgio Farroni	Mixed time trial T1-2	14:50.49	5

== Equestrian ==
Individual

Athlete	Horse	Event	Total	
Athlete	Horse	Event	Score	Rank
Antonella Cecilia	Corlord	Ind. champ. test grade II	EL	
Sara Morganti	Royal Delight	Ind. champ. test grade Ia	68.650	8
Sara Morganti	Royal Delight	Ind. freestyle test grade Ia	73.900	4
Francesca Salvade	Come On	Ind. champ. test grade II	67.381	14
Francesca Salvade	Come On	Ind. freestyle test grade II	64.750	14
Silvia Veratti	Zadok	Ind. champ. test grade II	69.905	9
Silvia Veratti	Zadok	Ind. freestyle test grade II	WD	

Team

Athlete	Horse	Event	Individual score			Total	
Athlete	Horse	Event	TT	CT	Total	Score	Rank
Antonella Cecilia	See above	Team	EL	RT	0	405.855	10
Sara Morganti	See above	Team	69.824	68.650	138.474*	405.855	10
Francesca Salvade	See above	Team	67.619	67.381	135.000*	405.855	10
Silvia Veratti	See above	Team	62.476	69.905	132.381*	405.855	10

* Indicates that score counts in team total

== Rowing ==
Athlete(s)	Event	Heats		Repechage		Final	
Athlete(s)	Event	Time	Rank	Time	Rank	Time	Rank
Silvia de Maria; Daniele Stefanoni	Mixed double sculls	4:02.17	3 R	4:07.60	2 FA	4:09.39	6
Pierre Calderoni; Mahila Laura Maria di Battista; Alessandro Franzetti; Andrea Marcaccini; Florinda Trombetta	Mixed coxed four	3:22.46	3 R	3:25.90	1 FA	3:27.91	5

Qualification Legend: FA=Final A (medal); FB=Final B (non-medal); R=Repechage

== Sailing ==
Athlete	Event	Race											Net points	Rank
Athlete	Event	1	2	3	4	5	6	7	8	9	10	11*	Net points	Rank
Fabrizio Olmi	2.4 mR - 1 person keelboat	10	5	(15)	7	12	4	15	9	6	10	—N/a	78	10
Marco Carlo Gualandris; Marta Zanetti	SKUD 18 - 2 person keelboat	5	6 DPI	6	6	6	(9)	6	5	5	1	—N/a	46	5
Antonio Squizzato; Massimo Dighe; Paola Protopapa	Sonar - 3 person keelboat	7	11	(12)	11	12	5	12	12	11	6	—N/a	87	12

* Due to a lack of wind Race 11 was cancelled

== Shooting ==
Athlete	Event	Qualification		Final	
Athlete	Event	Score	Rank	Score	Rank
Jacopo Cappelli	Men's 10 m air rifle standing SH1	578	19	Did not advance	
Jacopo Cappelli	Men's 50 m rifle 3 positions SH1	1111	18	Did not advance	
Jacopo Cappelli	Mixed 10 m air rifle prone SH1	593	35	Did not advance	
Jacopo Cappelli	Mixed 50 m rifle prone SH1	577	32	Did not advance	
Azzurra Ciani	Women's 10 m air rifle standing SH1	369	19	Did not advance	
Azzurra Ciani	Women's 50 m rifle 3 positions SH1	543	13	Did not advance	
Azzurra Ciani	Mixed 10 m air rifle prone SH1	600 EWR	=1	704.9	5
Azzurra Ciani	Mixed 50 m rifle prone SH1	580	26	Did not advance	
Massimo Dalla Casa	Mixed 10 m air rifle prone SH2	588	31	Did not advance	
Massimo Dalla Casa	Mixed 10 m air rifle standing SH2	584	28	Did not advance	
Giancarlo Iori	Men's 10 m air pistol SH1	543	27	Did not advance	
Giancarlo Iori	Mixed 25 m pistol SH1	544	19	Did not advance	
Giancarlo Iori	Mixed 50 m pistol SH1	530	9	Did not advance	
Marco Pusinich	Men's 10 m air pistol SH1	552	23	Did not advance	
Marco Pusinich	Mixed 50 m pistol SH1	529	10	Did not advance	

== Swimming ==
=== Men ===
Athlete	Events	Heats		Final	
Athlete	Events	Time	Rank	Time	Rank
Nicolo Bensi	50 m butterfly S5	49.06	15	Did not advance	
Nicolo Bensi	50 m breaststroke SB3	57.58	11	Did not advance	
Nicolo Bensi	150 m individual medley SM4	3:04.41	9	Did not advance	
Francesco Bettella	50 m freestyle S2	1:13.86	11	Did not advance	
Francesco Bettella	100 m freestyle S2	2:29.34	8 Q	2:31.17	7
Francesco Bettella	200 m freestyle S2	—N/a		5:02.96	5
Francesco Bettella	50 m backstroke S2	1:13.76	9	Did not advance	
Francesco Bocciardo	100 m freestyle S7	1:11.45	14	Did not advance	
Francesco Bocciardo	400 m freestyle S7	5:14.78	11	Did not advance	
Francesco Bocciardo	100 m backstroke S7	1:25.25	15	Did not advance	
Michele Ferrarin	100 m butterfly S8	1:07.26	10	Did not advance	
Michele Ferrarin	100 m breaststroke SB8	1:17.67	10	Did not advance	
Michele Ferrarin	200 m individual medley SM8	2:40.53	17	Did not advance	
Efrem Morelli	50 m freestyle S5	42.00	14	Did not advance	
Efrem Morelli	50 m butterfly S5	43.71	9	Did not advance	
Efrem Morelli	100 m breaststroke SB4	1:47.30	6 Q	1:47.79	6
Federico Morlacchi	100 m freestyle S9	58.57	8 Q	58.24	8
Federico Morlacchi	400 m freestyle S9	4:24.06	3 Q	4:18.55	3rd place, bronze medalist(s)
Federico Morlacchi	100 m butterfly S9	1:01.68	3 Q	1:00.77	3rd place, bronze medalist(s)
Federico Morlacchi	200 m individual medley SM9	2:23.32	5 Q	2:20:28	3rd place, bronze medalist(s)
Fabrizio Sottile	50 m freestyle S12	25.82	11	Did not advance	
Fabrizio Sottile	100 m freestyle S12	56.11	9	Did not advance	
Fabrizio Sottile	400 m freestyle S12	4:38.09	8 Q	4:36.74	8
Fabrizio Sottile	100 m butterfly S12	1:03.97	11	Did not advance	
Fabrizio Sottile	200 m individual medley SM12	2:21.75	7 Q	2:21.92	8

Qualifiers for the latter rounds (Q) of all events were decided on a time only basis, therefore positions shown are overall results versus competitors in all heats.

=== Women ===
Athlete	Events	Heats		Final	
Athlete	Events	Time	Rank	Time	Rank
Cecilia Camellini	50 m freestyle S11	31.15	1 Q	30.94 WR	1st place, gold medalist(s)
Cecilia Camellini	100 m freestyle S11	1:11.54	3 Q	1:07.29 WR	1st place, gold medalist(s)
Cecilia Camellini	400 m freestyle S11	5:25.70	3 Q	5:20.27	3rd place, bronze medalist(s)
Cecilia Camellini	100 m backstroke S11	1:25.63	4 Q	1:19.91	3rd place, bronze medalist(s)
Cecilia Camellini	200 m individual medley SM11	3:01.73	3 Q	3:01.86	6
Immacolata Cerasuolo	50 m freestyle S8	34.53	14	Did not advance	
Immacolata Cerasuolo	100 m freestyle S8	1:17.71	15	Did not advance	
Immacolata Cerasuolo	100 m butterfly S8	1:23.21	12	Did not advance	
Immacolata Cerasuolo	200 m individual medley SM8	3:05.67	9	Did not advance	
Stefania Chiaroni	200 m freestyle S5	4:22.87	12	Did not advance	
Stefania Chiaroni	50 m butterfly S5	DSQ		Did not advance	
Stefania Chiaroni	200 m individual medley SM5	4:53.25	13	Did not advance	
Emanuela Romano	200 m individual medley SM6	3:34.03	9	Did not advance	
Emanuela Romano	50 m freestyle S6	38.79	12	Did not advance	
Emanuela Romano	100 m freestyle S6	1:20.54	5 Q	1:19.54	5
Emanuela Romano	400 m freestyle S6	5:46.69	5 Q	5:44.36	5
Emanuela Romano	100 m backstroke S6	1:34.78	8 Q	1:33.90	7

Qualifiers for the latter rounds (Q) of all events were decided on a time only basis, therefore positions shown are overall results versus competitors in all heats.

== Table tennis ==
Men's singles

Athlete	Event	Preliminaries			Quarterfinals	Semifinals	Finals	
Athlete	Event	Opposition Result	Opposition Result	Rank	Opposition Result	Opposition Result	Opposition Result	Rank
Raimondo Alecci	Singles class 6	Wetherill (GBR); L 2–3	Kusiak (GER); W 3–1	1	Grundeler (FRA); L 0–3	Did not advance		
Andrea Borgato	Singles class 1	Vevera (AUT); L 0–3	Davies (GBR); L 0–3	3	—N/a	Did not advance		
Salvatore Caci	Singles class 4	Siada (ISR); L 0–3	Choi (KOR); W 3–0	3	Did not advance			
Davide Scazzieri	Singles class 7	Messi (FRA); L 0–3	Horut (CZE); L 0–3	3	Did not advance			
Giuseppe Vella	Singles class 2	Riapos (SVK); L 0–3	Kim (KOR); L 1–3	3	Did not advance			

Women's singles

Athlete	Event	Preliminaries			Quarterfinals	Semifinals	Finals	
Athlete	Event	Opposition Result	Opposition Result	Rank	Opposition Result	Opposition Result	Opposition Result	Rank
Michela Brunelli	Singles class 3	Choi (KOR); W 3–0	Head (GBR); L 2–3	2	Did not advance			
Maria Nardelli	Singles class 5	GU (CHN); L 0–3	Wei (TPE); L 0–3	3	—N/a	Did not advance		
Pamela Pezzutto	Singles class 1-2	Breathnach (IRL); W 3–0	Sireau (FRA); W 3–2	1	—N/a	Pushpasheva (RUS); W 3–0	Liu (CHN); L 0–3	2nd place, silver medalist(s)
Clara Podda	Singles class 1-2	Profitt (USA); W 3–0	Liu (CHN); L 1–3	2	—N/a	Did not advance		
Valeria Zorzetto	Singles class 4	Zhou (CHN); L 0–3	Dolinar (SLO); W 3–1	2	—N/a	Did not advance		

Teams

Athlete	Event	Round of 16	Quarterfinals	Semifinals	Finals	
Athlete	Event	Opposition Result	Opposition Result	Opposition Result	Opposition Result	Rank
Andrea Borgato; Giuseppe Vella	Men's team class 1-2	—N/a	Austria (AUT); L 1–3	Did not advance		
Raimondo Alecci; Davide Scazzieri	Men's team class 6-8	Thailand (THA); W 3–2	Great Britain (GBR); L 0–3	Did not advance		
Michela Brunelli; Pamela Pezzutto; Clara Podda	Women's team class 1-3	Bye	Ireland (IRL); W 3–0	China (CHN); L 0–3	Great Britain (GBR); L 2–3	4
Maria Nardelli; Valeria Zorzetto	Women's team class 4-5	Chinese Taipei (TPE); W 3–2	China (CHN); L 0–3	Did not advance		

== Wheelchair basketball ==
Italy qualified for the men's team event in wheelchair basketball by finishing fourth at the 2010 Wheelchair Basketball World Championship. Competing athletes are given an eight-level-score specific to wheelchair basketball, ranging from 0.5 to 4.5 with lower scores representing a higher degree of disability. The sum score of all players on the court cannot exceed 14.

Group play

Team	Pld	W	L	PF	PA	PD	Pts	Qualification
Australia	5	5	0	372	259	+113	10	Quarter-finals
Turkey	5	3	2	331	302	+29	8 (Note: Head-to-head score differential: TUR: +6; USA: −1; ESP: −5)	Quarter-finals
United States	5	3	2	330	259	+71	8	Quarter-finals
Spain	5	3	2	322	292	+30	8	Quarter-finals
Italy	5	1	4	260	309	−49	6	Eliminated
South Africa	5	0	5	204	398	−194	5	Eliminated

Rules for classification: 1) Table points, 2) Head-to-head score differential
Notes:

30 August 2012
10:45

Report

Spain	67–40	Italy
Scoring by quarter: 19–12, 20–14, 14–8, 14–6
Pts: De Paz Pazo 18; Rebs: Garcia Moreno 11; Asts: De Paz Pazo, Muiño Gámez 5		Pts: Raimondi, Cavagnini 8 Rebs: Cavagnini 7 Asts: Raimondi, Moukhariq 3

North Greenwich Arena, London
Referees: Rui Marques (BRA)

31 August 2012
15:15

Report

Italy	51–77	United States
Scoring by quarter: 10–13, 20–24, 13–20, 8–20
Pts: Moukhariq 13; Rebs: Cavagnini 9 Asts: Raimondi 5		Pts: Nelms 24; Rebs: Hinze 7 Asts: Serio 6

Basketball Arena, London
Referees: Krunoslav Peić (CRO)

1 September 2012
10:45

Report

Turkey	65–60	Italy
Scoring by quarter: 21–7, 14–21, 11–10, 19–22
Pts: Gürbulak 17; Rebs: Gürbulak 14; Asts: Gürbulak 11		Pts: Cavagnini 25; Rebs: Cavagnini 15; Asts: Moukhariq 5

Basketball Arena, London
Referees: Gustavo Mathias (BRA)

2 September 2012
13:00

Report

South Africa	32–61	Italy
Scoring by quarter: 12–13, 2–12, 13–12, 5–24
Pts: Nortje 15; Rebs: Mbande 7 Asts: Mbande 3		Pts: Cavagnini 33; Rebs: Cavagnini 17; Asts: Moukhariq 7

Basketball Arena, London
Referees: Eisuke Kanno (JPN)

3 September 2012
15:15

Report

Italy	48–68	Australia
Scoring by quarter: 11–15, 10–18, 17–24, 10–11
Pts: Cavagnini 16; Rebs: Pellegrini 12; Asts: Moukhariq 5		Pts: Stibners 17; Rebs: Eveson, Latham 6 Asts: Norris 5

Basketball Arena, London
Referees: Saskia Warmerdam (NED)

9th–10th place match

5 September 2012
10:45

Report

Italy	60–64	Japan
Scoring by quarter: 13–20, 18–18, 14–15, 15–11
Pts: Cavagnini 31; Rebs: Cavagnini 6 Asts: Raimondi 5		Pts: Masubuchi 14; Rebs: Fujimoto 10; Asts: Fujimoto 5

North Greenwich Arena, London
Referees: Mati Quintana (ARG)

== Wheelchair fencing ==
Athlete	Event	Qualification			Round of 16	Quarterfinal	Semifinal	Final / BM	
Athlete	Event	Opposition Score	Opposition Score	Rank	Opposition Score	Opposition Score	Opposition Score	Opposition Score	Rank
Matteo Betti	Men's ind. épée A	Yusupov (RUS); W 5–3	Juhasz (HUN); W 5–4	3	Bye	Demchuk (UKR) (6); W 15–11	Noble (FRA) (7); L 9–15	Yusupov (RUS); W 15–10	3rd place, bronze medalist(s)
Matteo Betti	Men's ind. épée A	Demchuk (UKR); L 4–5	van der Wege (USA); W 5–0	3	Bye	Demchuk (UKR) (6); W 15–11	Noble (FRA) (7); L 9–15	Yusupov (RUS); W 15–10	3rd place, bronze medalist(s)
Matteo Betti	Men's ind. foil A	Yusupov (RUS); L 3–5	Mato (HUN); L 3–5	14	Did not advance				
Matteo Betti	Men's ind. foil A	Chen (CHN); L 0–5	Pender (POL); L 4–5	14	Did not advance				
Marco Cima	Men's ind. foil B	Datsko (UKR); L 5–0	Wyganowski (POL); W 5–3	9	Chung (HKG) (8); W 15–13	Francois (FRA) (1); W 15–14	Datsko (UKR) (4); L 3–15	Latreche (FRA) (2); L 15–11	4
Marco Cima	Men's ind. foil B	Chung (HKG); W 5–4	Silva Guissone (BRA); L 5–4	9	Chung (HKG) (8); W 15–13	Francois (FRA) (1); W 15–14	Datsko (UKR) (4); L 3–15	Latreche (FRA) (2); L 15–11	4
Alessio Sarri	Men's ind. sabre B	Boehm (AUT); W 5–0	Bogdos (GRE); L 3–5	6	Bye	Datsko (UKR) (3); W 15–13	Pluta (POL) (2); L 10–15	Yusupov (RUS) (4); W 15–7	3rd place, bronze medalist(s)
Alessio Sarri	Men's ind. sabre B	Datsko (UKR); W 5–2	Yusupov (RUS); L 4–5	6	Bye	Datsko (UKR) (3); W 15–13	Pluta (POL) (2); L 10–15	Yusupov (RUS) (4); W 15–7	3rd place, bronze medalist(s)
Matteo Betti; Marco Cima; Andrea Macrì	Men's team open	—N/a				Ukraine (UKR); W 45–37	China (CHN); L 19–45	Hong Kong (HKG); L 42–45	4
Loredana Trigilia	Women's ind. foil A	Lao (MAC); L 4–5	Fan (HKG); L 2–5	11	—N/a	Did not advance			
Loredana Trigilia	Women's ind. foil A	Krajnyak (HUN); L 4–5	Rong (CHN); L 3–5	11	—N/a	Did not advance			
Loredana Trigilia	Women's ind. foil A	Bernard (FRA); L 4–5		11	—N/a	Did not advance			

== Wheelchair tennis ==
Athlete	Event	Round of 64	Round of 32	Round of 16	Quarterfinals	Semifinals	Final / BM	
Athlete	Event	Opposition Score	Opposition Score	Opposition Score	Opposition Score	Opposition Score	Opposition Score	Rank
Fabian Mazzei	Men's singles	Fernandez (ARG); L 0–6, 0–6	Did not advance					
Marianna Lauro	Women's singles	—N/a	Shuker (GBR); L 2–6, 1–6	Did not advance				
Marco Innocenti	Quad singles	—N/a		Barten (USA); L 3–6, 4–6	Did not advance			
Giuseppe Polidori	Quad singles	—N/a		Kramer (ISR); L 3–6, 2–6	Did not advance			
Marco Innocenti; Giuseppe Polidori	Quad doubles	—N/a			Kawano/Oroishi (JPN); L 3–6, 6–7	Did not advance		

== See also ==
- Italy at the Paralympics
- Italy at the 2012 Summer Olympics
