= Cycling at the 2012 Summer Paralympics – Men's road time trial C3 =

Cycling, Men's road time trial C3 at the XIV Paralympic Games
- Venue: Brands Hatch
- Dates: September 5, 2012
- Competitors: 14 from 13 nations

Medalists
1st place, gold medalist(s)		David Nicholas	Australia
2nd place, silver medalist(s)		Joseph Berenyi	United States
3rd place, bronze medalist(s)		Masaki Fujita	Japan

The Men's time trial C3 road cycling event at the 2012 Summer Paralympics took place on September 5 at Brands Hatch. Fourteen riders from thirteen different nations competed. The race distance was 16 km.

== Results ==
Rank	Name	Country	Time
1st place, gold medalist(s)	David Nicholas	Australia	23:22.13
2nd place, silver medalist(s)	Joseph Berenyi	United States	23:31.73
3rd place, bronze medalist(s)	Masaki Fujita	Japan	23:55.54
4	Glenn Johansen	Norway	24:09.26
5	Roberto Bargna	Italy	24:34.39
6	Shaun McKeown	Great Britain	24:44.37
7	Steffen Warias	Germany	24:57.06
8	Alexsey Obydennov	Russia	24:58.19
9	Jacky Galletaud	France	24:59.52
10	Nathan Smith	New Zealand	24:59.69
11	Juan Emilio Gutierrez Berenguel	Spain	25:05.22
12	Jin Yong Sik	South Korea	25:38.03
13	Paolo Vigano	Italy	26:05.59
14	Enda Smyth	Ireland	27:30.64
