= Cycling at the 2012 Summer Paralympics – Mixed team sprint =

Cycling, Men's individual sprint at the XIV Paralympic Games
- Venue: London Velopark
- Dates: 2 September 2012
- Competitors: 10

Medalists
1st place, gold medalist(s)		Ji Xiaofei; Liu Xinyang; Xie Hao	China
2nd place, silver medalist(s)		Jon-Allan Butterworth; Darren Kenny; Richard Waddon	Great Britain
3rd place, bronze medalist(s)		Joseph Berenyi; Sam Kavanagh; Jennifer Schuble	United States

The Mixed team sprint track cycling event at the 2012 Summer Paralympics took place on 2 September at London Velopark. The event was contested riders in classes C1-5. Ten national teams competed. The teams with the best two qualifying times raced off for gold and silver, third and fourth for bronze.

== Qualification ==
Q=Qualified for final round. WR=World record.

Rank	Team	Cyclists	Time	Notes
1	China	Ji Xiaofei (C4-M); Liu Xinyang (C5-M); Xie Hao (C2-M)	49.804	Q WR
2	Great Britain	Jon-Allan Butterworth (C5-M); Darren Kenny (C3-M); Richard Waddon (C3-M)	49.808	Q
3	United States	Joseph Berenyi (C3-M); Sam Kavanagh (C4-M); Jennifer Schuble (C5-W)	53.174	Q
4	Czech Republic	Jiri Bouska (C4-M); Jiří Ježek (C4-M); Ivo Koblasa (C2-M)	53.751	Q
5	Australia	Michael Gallagher (C5-M); David Nicholas (C3-M); Susan Powell (C4-W)	55.347	
6	Germany	Tobias Graf (C2-M); Wolfgang Sacher (C5-M); Steffen Warias (C3-M)	56.011	
7	Spain	Alfonso Cabello (C5-M); Maurice Eckhard Tio (C2-M); Cesar Neira (C4-M)	56.236	
8	Ireland	Colin Lynch (C2-M); Cathal Miller (C5-M); Enda Smyth (C3-M)	56.401	
9	Italy	Roberto Bargna (C3-M); Andrea Tarlao (C5-M); Paolo Vigano (C3-M)	57.095	
10	New Zealand	Chris Ross (C5-M); Nathan Smith (C3-M); Fiona Southorn (C5-W)	57.449	

== Finals ==
Gold medal match

Rank	Team	Cyclists	Time	Notes
1st place, gold medalist(s)	China	Ji Xiaofei (C4-M); Liu Xinyang (C5-M); Xie Hao (C2-M)	49.454	WR
2nd place, silver medalist(s)	Great Britain	Jon-Allan Butterworth (C5-M); Darren Kenny (C3-M); Richard Waddon (C3-M)	49.519	

Bronze medal match

Rank	Team	Cyclists	Time	Notes
3rd place, bronze medalist(s)	United States	Joseph Berenyi (C3-M); Sam Kavanagh (C4-M); Jennifer Schuble (C5-W)	52.749	
4	Czech Republic	Jiri Bouska (C4-M); Jiří Ježek (C4-M); Ivo Koblasa (C2-M)	54.128	
