= Cycling at the 2012 Summer Paralympics – Men's individual pursuit C3 =

Cycling, Men's Ind. Pursuit C3 at the XIV Paralympic Games
- Venue: ExCeL Exhibition Centre
- Dates: 31 August
- Competitors: 12 from 11 nations

Medalists
1st place, gold medalist(s)		Joseph Berenyi	United States
2nd place, silver medalist(s)		Shaun McKeown	Great Britain
3rd place, bronze medalist(s)		Darren Kenny	Great Britain

The Men's Individual Pursuit C3 track cycling event at the 2012 Summer Paralympics took place on 31 August at London Velopark. The race distance was 3 km.

== Preliminaries ==
Q = Qualifier PR = Paralympic Record WR = World Record

Rank	Name	Country	Time
1	Joseph Berenyi	United States	3:36.148 Q WR
2	Shaun McKeown	Great Britain	3:36.427 Q
3	David Nicholas	Australia	3:36.757 Q
4	Darren Kenny	Great Britain	3:37.977 Q
5	Alexsey Obydennov	Russia	3:43.244
6	Juan Emilio Gutierrez Berenguel	Spain	3:44.303
7	Enda Smyth	Ireland	3:47.542
8	Nathan Smith	New Zealand	3:48.555
9	Masaki Fujita	Japan	3:51.743
10	Kris Bosmans	Belgium	3:52.453
11	Jin Yong Sik	South Korea	3:57.694
12	Steffen Warias	Germany	3:58.919

== Finals ==
Gold medal match

Name	Time	Rank
Joseph Berenyi (USA)	3:37.912	1st place, gold medalist(s)
Shaun McKeown (GBR)	3:38.637	2nd place, silver medalist(s)

Bronze medal match

Name	Time	Rank
Darren Kenny (GBR)	3:35.257 WR	3rd place, bronze medalist(s)
David Nicholas (AUS)	3:38.800	4
