= Cycling at the 2012 Summer Paralympics – Men's road race C1–3 =

Cycling, men's road race C1–3 at the XIV Paralympic Games
- Venue: Brands Hatch
- Dates: 6 September 2012
- Competitors: 40

The men's road race C1–3 cycling event at the 2012 Summer Paralympics took place on 6 September at Brands Hatch. Forty riders competed. The race distance was 64 km.

== Results ==
Source: DNF = Did Not Finish

Rank	Name	Country	Class	Time
1st place, gold medalist(s)	Roberto Bargna	Italy	C3	1:42:51
2nd place, silver medalist(s)	Steffen Warias	Germany	C3	1:42:51
3rd place, bronze medalist(s)	David Nicholas	Australia	C3	1:42:51
4	Paolo Vigano	Italy	C3	1:42:51
5	Kris Bosmans	Belgium	C3	1:42:51
6	Joseph Berenyi	United States	C3	1:42:51
7	Victor Hugo Garrido Marquez	Venezuela	C2	1:42:51
8	Alvaro Galvis Becerra	Colombia	C2	1:42:51
9	Glenn Johansen	Norway	C3	1:42:51
10	Tobias Graf	Germany	C2	1:42:51
11	Juan Emilio Gutierrez Berenguel	Spain	C3	1:42:51
12	Masaki Fujita	Japan	C3	1:42:51
13	Jacky Galletaud	France	C3	1:42:56
14	Laurent Thirionet	France	C2	1:42:58
15	Michael Teuber	Germany	C1	1:43:32
16	Michal Stark	Czech Republic	C2	1:43:32
17	Juan Jose Mendez	Spain	C1	1:43:32
18	Erich Winkler	Germany	C1	1:43:32
19	Cirio de Jesus Molina	Venezuela	C2	1:43:32
20	Maurice Eckhard Tio	Spain	C2	1:43:32
21	Shaun McKeown	Great Britain	C3	1:43:52
22	Jin Yong Sik	South Korea	C3	1:48:13
23	Alexsey Obydennov	Russia	C3	1:51:27
24	Mark Colbourne	Great Britain	C1	1:53:22
25	Roman Pongrac	Slovenia	C2	1:53:33
26	Jaroslav Svestka	Slovakia	C2	1:55:01
	Jaye Milley	Canada	C1	DNF
	Rodrigo Fernando Lopez	Argentina	C1	DNF
	Liang Guihua	China	C2	DNF
	Nathan Smith	New Zealand	C3	DNF
	Anthony Zahn	United States	C1	DNF
	Brayden McDougall	Canada	C1	DNF
	Li Zhangyu	China	C1	DNF
	Xie Hao	China	C2	DNF
	Ivo Koblasa	Czech Republic	C2	DNF
	Arnold Boldt	Canada	C2	DNF
	Jaco Nel	South Africa	C2	DNF
	Colin Lynch	Ireland	C2	DNF
	Mumuni Alem	Ghana	C2	DNF
	Enda Smyth	Ireland	C3	DNS
