= Cycling at the 2012 Summer Paralympics – Men's road race C4–5 =

Cycling, Men's road race C4-5 at the XIV Paralympic Games
- Venue: Brands Hatch
- Dates: September 6, 2012
- Competitors: 31 from 23 nations

Medalists
1st place, gold medalist(s)		Yegor Dementyev	Ukraine
2nd place, silver medalist(s)		Liu Xinyang	China
3rd place, bronze medalist(s)		Michele Pittacolo	Italy

The Men's road race C4-5 cycling event at the 2012 Summer Paralympics took place on September 6 at Brands Hatch. Thirty-one riders from twenty-three nations competed. The race distance was 80 km.

== Results ==
DNF = Did Not Finish

Rank	Name	Country	Class	Time
1st place, gold medalist(s)	Yegor Dementyev	Ukraine	C5	1:55:38
2nd place, silver medalist(s)	Liu Xinyang	China	C5	1:55:48
3rd place, bronze medalist(s)	Michele Pittacolo	Italy	C4	1:55:51
4	Joao Alberto Schwindt Filho	Brazil	C5	1:55:51
5	Soelito Gohr	Brazil	C5	1:55:51
6	Wolfgang Eibeck	Austria	C5	1:55:54
7	Jiří Ježek	Czech Republic	C4	1:55:54
8	Carol-Eduard Novak	Romania	C4	1:55:54
9	Michael Gallagher	Australia	C5	1:56:06
10	Andrea Tarlao	Italy	C5	1:56:06
11	Roberto Alcaide	Spain	C4	1:57:13
12	Damian Lopez Alfonso	Cuba	C4	1:59:33
13	Cesar Neira	Spain	C4	1:59:33
14	Cathal Miller	Ireland	C5	1:59:34
15	Dax Jaikel	Costa Rica	C4	1:59:34
16	Wolfgang Sacher	Germany	C5	2:01:25
17	Cedric Ramassamy	France	C5	2:01:30
18	Chris Ross	New Zealand	C5	2:01:32
19	Jiri Bouska	Czech Republic	C4	2:02:09
20	Diego German Duenas Gomez	Colombia	C4	2:02:09
21	Bastiaan Gruppen	Netherlands	C5	2:02:09
22	Sam Kavanagh	United States	C4	2:02:17
	Bahman Golbarnezhad	Iran	C4	DNF
	Morten Jahr	Norway	C4	DNF
	Ji Xiaofei	China	C4	DNF
	Jon-Allan Butterworth	Great Britain	C5	DNF
	Rodny Minier	Dominican Republic	C5	DNF
	Imre Torok	Romania	C5	DNF
	Koen Reyserhove	Belgium	C4	DNF
	Manfred Gattringer	Austria	C4	DNF
	Alfonso Cabello	Spain	C5	DNF
