= Luca Pizzi =

Italian Paralympic cyclist

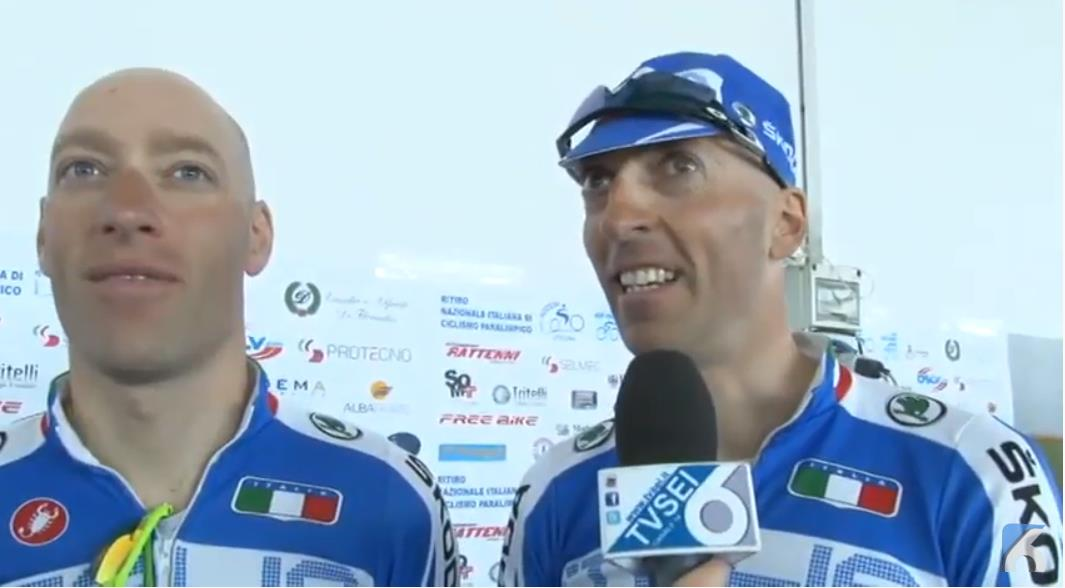
- Luca Pizzi (right) with his brother Ivano (guide) in 2015.

Personal information
- Born: 18 March 1974 (age 52) Toronto, Canada

Sport
- Country: Italy
- Sport: Para cycling
Medal record
| Event | 1st | 2nd | 3rd |
|---|---|---|---|
| Paralympic Games | 1 | 1 | 0 |

Luca Pizzi (born 18 March 1974) is an Italian paralympic cyclist who won two medals at the 2012 Summer Paralympics as the guide of his brother, who is the Paralympic champion, Ivano Pizzi.
