= Ivano Pizzi =

Italian Paralympic cyclist

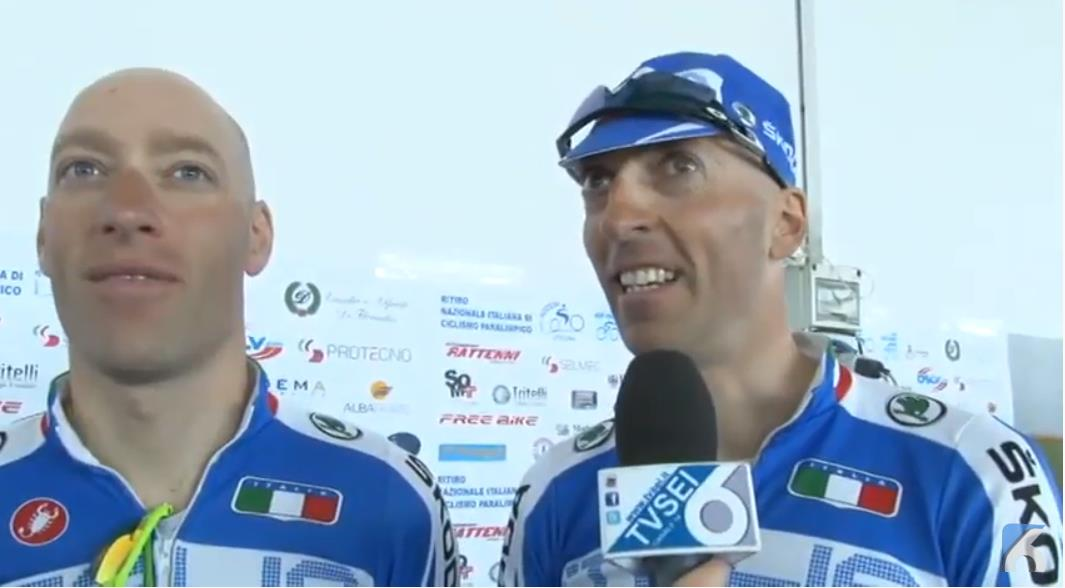
- Ivano Pizzi (left) with his brother Luca (guide) in 2015.

Personal information
- Born: 1 July 1982 (age 43) Barrie, Ontario, Canada

Sport
- Country: Italy
- Sport: Para cycling
Medal record
Event	1st	2nd	3rd
Paralympic Games	1	1	0

Ivano Pizzi (born 1 July 1982) is an Italian paralympic cyclist who won two medals at the 2012 Summer Paralympics.

He is the brother of his guide Luca Pizzi.
