= Michele Pittacolo =

Italian Paralympic cyclist

Personal information
- Born: 5 September 1970 (age 55) Udine, Italy

Sport
- Country: Italy
- Sport: Para cycling
Medal record
Event	1st	2nd	3rd
Paralympic Games	0	1	0

Michele Pittacolo (born 5 September 1970) is an Italian paralympic cyclist who won a bronze medal at the 2012 Summer Paralympics.
