= Andrea Tarlao =

Italian Paralympic cyclist

- Andrea Tarlao (2026)

Personal information
- Born: 8 January 1994 (age 32) Gorizia, Italy

Sport
- Country: Italy
- Sport: Para cycling
- Disability: Impaired muscle power
- Disability class: C5
- Club: Team Levante
- Coached by: Mario Valentini
Medal record
Event	1st	2nd	3rd
Paralympic Games	0	0	1
Road World Para Cycling C'ships	3	1	2
Track World Para Cycling C'ships	0	0	1
Total	3	1	4

Andrea Tarlao (born 8 January 1994) is an Italian paralympic cyclist who won a bronze medal at the 2016 Summer Paralympics.
