= Juan Emilio Gutiérrez =

Spanish cyclist

Personal information
- Full name: Juan Emilio Gutiérrez Berenguel
- Nationality: Spanish
- Born: 21 December 1968 (age 57) Almería, Spain

Sport
- Country: Spain
- Sport: Cycling (C3)

Juan Emilio Gutiérrez Berenguel (born 21 December 1968) is a Spanish cyclist. He competed at the 2009 Paralympic World Championships Road Cycling where he earned a pair of medals. He represented Spain at the 2012 Summer Paralympics where he earned a Paralympic diploma.

== Personal ==
Gutiérrez has cerebral palsy, and is from Almería. In 2009, he was named one of the Best Athlete with Disabilities at the Andalusia Sports Awards.

== Cycling ==
Gutiérrez is a C3 cyclist.

In 2009, Gutiérrez was getting funding assistance from the Provincial Government of Almeria. France hosted the Challenger International Handisport in 2009, with Gutiérrez winning his class. At the 2009 Paralympic World Championships Road Cycling, he earned a pair of medals including a silver in the time trial event and a bronze in another road event. This was his debut at the event as well as the first time the Royal Spanish Cycling Federation partnered with Spanish disability sport organizations. At a 2011 Paralympic Track World Cup event in Roskilde, Denmark, he won a silver medal with a time of 21:38.21.

Gutiérrez competed at the 2012 Summer Paralympics. He was one of thirty-five Andalusians to represent Spain at the London Games, which were his first. He participated in the individual pursuit event, and had a sixth-place finish on the track which earned him a Paralympic diploma. During a ride on 4 September, after colliding with a car during training, he fell off his bicycle and bruised himself but did not break anything. At that point in the Games, he still had to events left on his Paralympic programme. He also participated in road events, finishing one event in eleventh place in a thirteen deep with a time of 1:42.51. The Minister of Culture and Sport of the Government of Andalucía, Luciano Alonso, published a notice on behalf of the Government wishing him and other Andalusian competitors success at the Games.
