= Shaun McKeown =

British Paralympic cyclist

Shaun McKeown (born 2 March 1980) is a Paralympic track and road cyclist for Great Britain. Shaun won silver in the men's individual pursuit at the London 2012 Paralympic Games.
