= Steffen Warias =

German para-cyclist (born 1985)

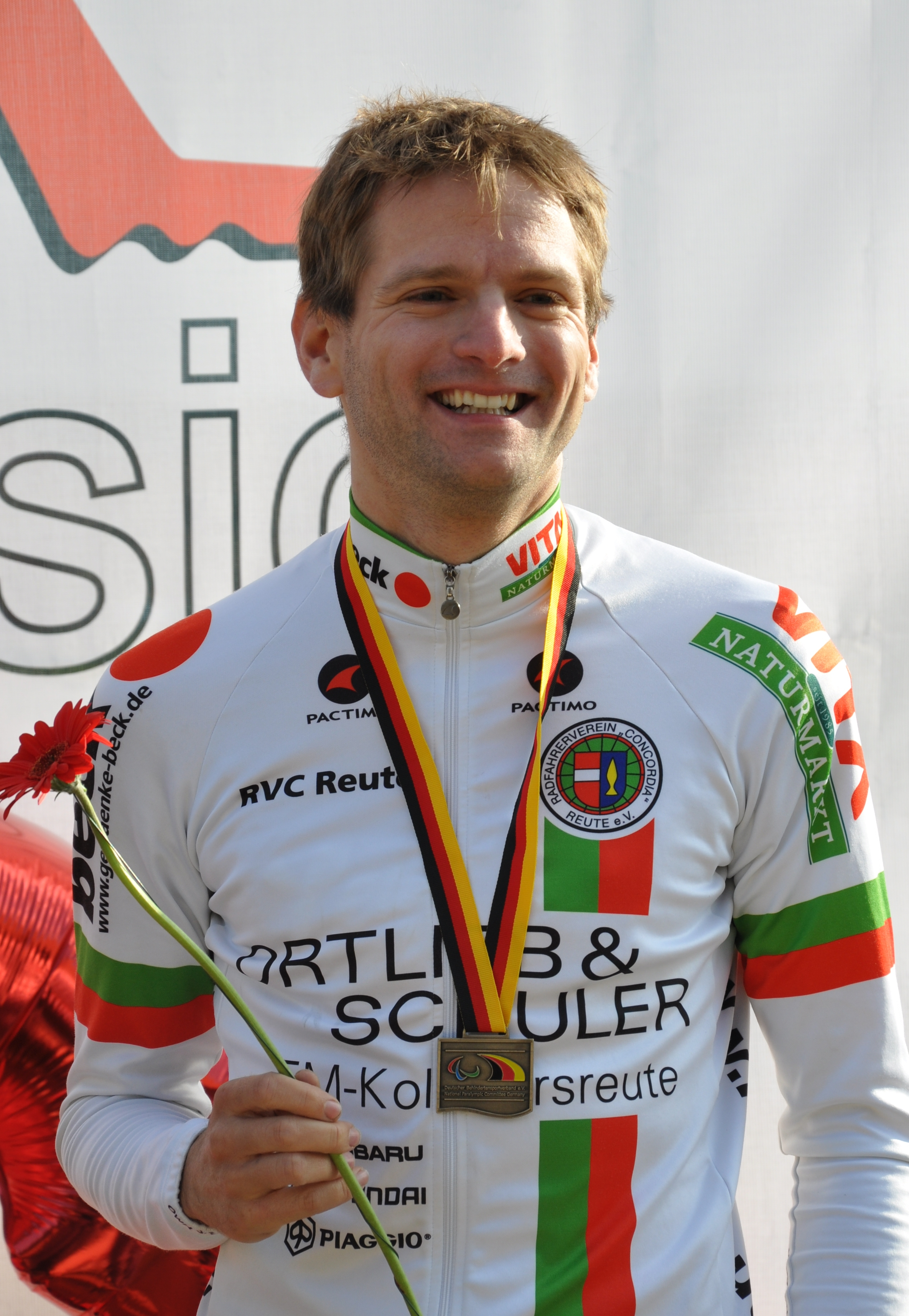

Personal information
- Born: 1 January 1985 (age 41) Tübingen, West Germany

Sport
- Country: Germany
- Sport: Para-cycling

Achievements and titles
- Paralympic finals: London 2012, Rio de Janeiro 2016, Tokyo 2020
Medal record
Representing Germany
Paralympic Games
Gold medal – first place	2016 Rio	Road race C1-3
Silver medal – second place	2012 London	Road race C1-3
Bronze medal – third place	2020 Tokyo	Time trial C3

Steffen Warias (born 1 January 1985 in Tübingen) is a para-cyclist from Germany. He won medals in cycling at the 2012 and 2016 Summer Paralympics. He is set to compete in Cycling at the 2020 Summer Paralympics.
