= David Nicholas =

Australian Paralympic cyclist (born 1991)

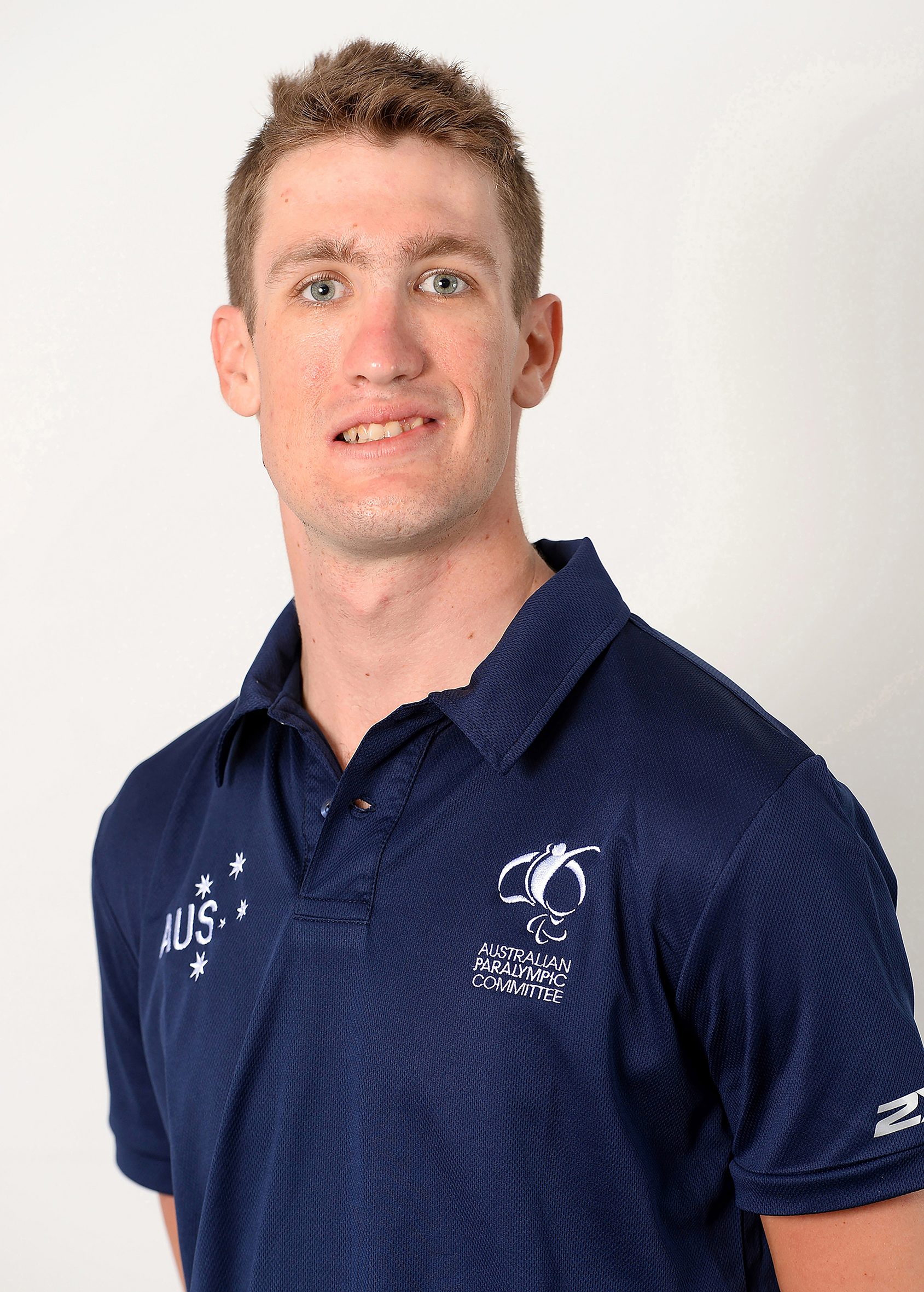
- 2016 Australian Paralympic team portrait of Nicholas

Personal information
- Nationality: Australian
- Born: 1 December 1991 (age 34) Perth, Australia

Sport
- Country: Australia
- Sport: Cycling
- Disability class: C3
Medal record
Men's para cycling
Paralympic Games
Gold medal – first place	2012 London	Road time trial C3
Gold medal – first place	2016 Rio	3km individual pursuit C3
Bronze medal – third place	2012 London	Individual C1–3 road race
Bronze medal – third place	2020 Tokyo	3km individual pursuit C3
Road World Championships
Gold medal – first place	2011 Roskilde	Individual time trial C3
Silver medal – second place	2011 Roskilde	Road race C3
Gold medal – first place	2013 Baie-Comeau	Individual time trial C3
Gold medal – first place	2019 Emmen	Individual time trial C3
Track World Championships
Gold medal – first place	2012 Carson	3km individual pursuit C3
Gold medal – first place	2017 Los Angeles	3km Individual Pursuit C3
Gold medal – first place	2018 Rio	Individual pursuit C3
Gold medal – first place	2019 Apeldoorn	3km individual pursuit C3
Gold medal – first place	2019 Apeldoorn	Scratch race C3
Gold medal – first place	2020 Milton	3km individual pursuit C3
Silver medal – second place	2012 Carson	1km time trial C3
Silver medal – second place	2016 Montichiari	3km individual pursuit C3
Silver medal – second place	2017 Los Angeles	1km Time Trial C3
Bronze medal – third place	2014 Aguascalientes	3km individual pursuit C3
Bronze medal – third place	2017 Los Angeles	Scratch race C1-3
Bronze medal – third place	2022 Saint-Quentin-en-Yvelines	Omnium C3
Bronze medal – third place	2022 Saint-Quentin-en-Yvelines	Individual pursuit C3

David Nicholas, OAM (born 1 December 1991) is an Australian cyclist. He won silver and gold medals at the 2012 London Paralympics and a gold medal at the 2016 Rio Paralympics and a bronze medal at the 2020 Tokyo Paralympics.

== Personal ==
David Aron Nicholas was born on 1 December 1991 in Rockhampton. He has cerebral palsy. Other sports he participates include karate. As of 2016 he lived in the Queensland town of Proserpine. where he worked as IT Support Officer at Whitsunday Regional Council.

Nicholas now lives in Bathurst NSW, where he lives with his fiancé Emilie Miller, herself an accomplished international athlete.

== Cycling ==
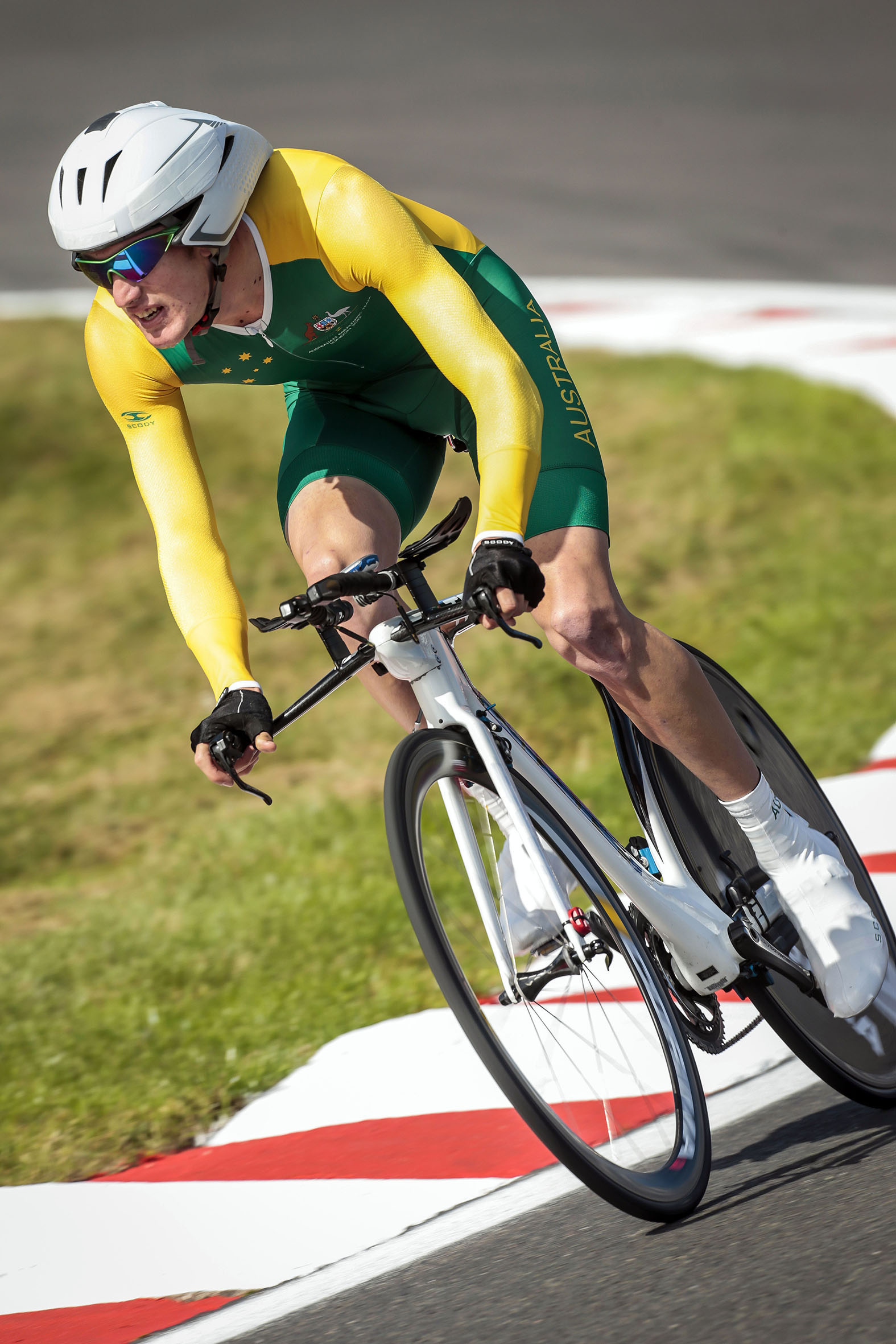
Nicholas at the 2012 London Paralympics

Nicholas is a C3 classified cyclist who competes in road and track events. At the 2011 UCI Para-cycling Road World Championships in Roskilde, Denmark, he won the gold medal in the Men's Time Trial C3 and silver medal in the Men's Road Race C3. In 2012, he participated in the UCI Para-cycling Track World Championships in Los Angeles, where he finished first in the C3 3 km individual pursuit. In the lead up to the 2012 London Paralympics, he participated in the Blenheim Palace festival of cycling time trial event. At the games, Nicholas won a gold medal in the Men's Individual C 3 Road Time Trial and a bronze medal in the Men's Individual C1–3 Road Race. He also participated in the Men's 1 km Time Trial C1–3, Men's Individual Pursuit C3 and Mixed Team Sprint C1–5 events.

Competing at the 2013 Para-cycling Road World Championships, Baie-Comeau, Canada, he won a gold medal in the Men's Individual Time Trial C3. At the 2014 UCI Para-cycling Track World Championships in Aguascalientes, Mexico, he won a bronze medal in the Men's 3 km Individual Pursuit C3.

At the 2015 UCI Para-cycling Road World Championships Nottwil, Switzerland, he finished seventh in the Men's Time Trial C3 and Men's Road Race C3.

Nicholas won the gold medal in the Men's 3 km Individual Pursuit C3 at the 2016 Rio Paralympics. He set a Paralympic record of 3:32.336 in qualifying for the gold medal race. His other results were fourth in the Men's Road Time Trial C3 and fifth in the Men's Road Time Trial C3 and sixth in the Mixed Sprint.

At the 2017 UCI Para-cycling Track World Championships in Los Angeles, United States, Nicholas won the gold medal in the Men's 3 km Individual Pursuit C3, a silver medal in Men's 1 km Time Trial C3 and a bronze medal in the Men's Scratch Race C1-3.

At the 2017 UCI Para-cycling Road World Championships, Pietermaritzburg, South Africa, he finished ninth in the Men's Time Trial C3 and 13th in the Men's Road Race C1-3.

At the 2018 UCI Para-cycling Track World Championships in Rio de Janeiro, Brazil, Nicholas won the gold medal in the Men's 3 km Individual Pursuit C3.

At the 2018 UCI Para-cycling Road World Championships, Rio de Janeiro, Brazil, he won the gold medal in the Men's 3 km Pursuit C3

Nicholas won a third straight world crown in C3 individual pursuit category at the 2019 UCI Para-cycling Track World Championships in Apeldoorn, Netherlands. He also won the gold medal in the Men's Scratch Race C3 and finished third in the Omnium Test Event C3.

At the 2019 UCI Para-cycling Road World Championships, Emmen, Netherlands, he won the gold medal in the Men's Time Trial C3 and tenth in the Men's Road Race C3.

At the 2020 UCI Para-cycling Track World Championships in Milton, Ontario, he won the gold medal in the Men's Individual Pursuit C3 and finished sixth in the Men's Scratch Race C3.

Nicholas won his fourth Paralympic medal, in winning the bronze medal in the Men's 3km Pursuit C3 at the 2020 Summer Paralympics with a time of 3:25.877. He finished 18th in the Men's Road Race C1–3 and eighth in the Men's Road Time Trial C3.

At the 2022 UCI Para-cycling Track World Championships in Saint-Quentin-en-Yvelines, France, he won the bronze medal in Men's Omnium C4.

At the 2024 UCI Para-cycling Track World Championships in Rio de Janeiro, Brazil, he finished fourth in both the Men's Time Trial and Individual Pursuit C3 events.

== Recognition ==
He was awarded an Order of Australia Medal in the 2014 Australia Day Honours "for service to sport as a Gold Medallist at the London 2012 Paralympic Games." In November 2016, he was awarded the Sporting Wheelies and Disabled Association Sporting Wheelie of The Year. He was awarded Cycling Australia's Male Elite Para-Cyclist for 2016 and 2017. In November 2017, he was awarded Queensland Sport Athlete with a Disability.
