= Roberto Bargna =

Italian Paralympic cyclist

Personal information
- Born: 7 April 1972 (age 54) Como, Italy

Sport
- Country: Italy
- Sport: Para cycling
Medal record
Event	1st	2nd	3rd
Paralympic Games	1	0	0

Roberto Bargna (born 7 April 1972) is a former Italian paralympic cyclist who won a gold medal at the 2012 Summer Paralympics.
